= 1969 USA Indoor Track and Field Championships =

National athletics championship event

- Dates: March 1
- Host city: Philadelphia, Pennsylvania, United States
- Venue: The Spectrum
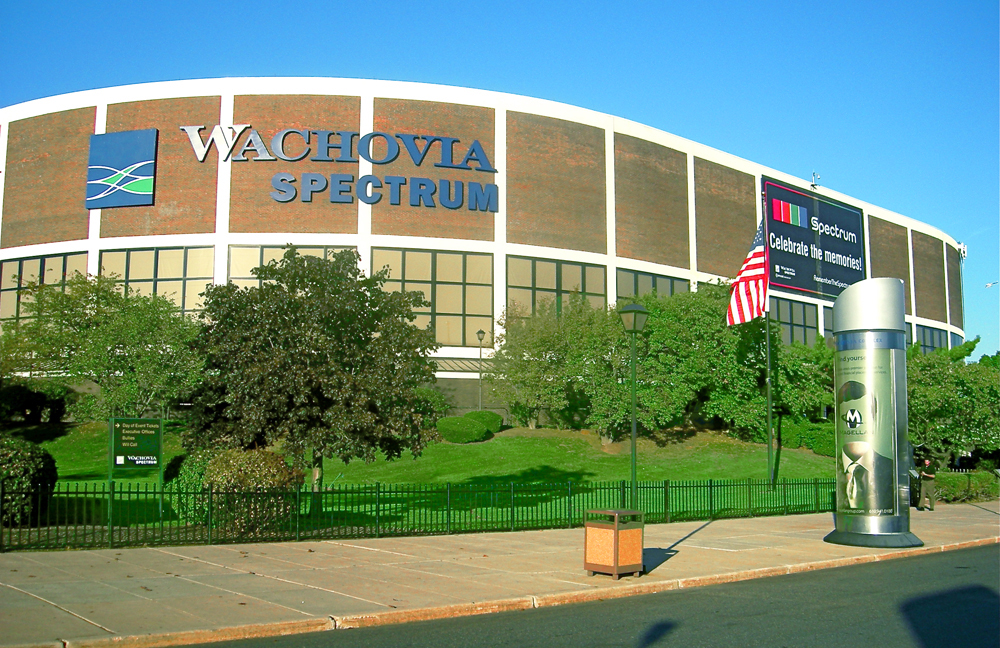
- Level: Senior
- Type: Indoor
- Events: 23 (13 men's + 10 women's)

The 1969 USA Indoor Track and Field Championships were held at The Spectrum in Philadelphia, Pennsylvania. Organized by the Amateur Athletic Union (AAU), the competition took place on March 1 and served as the national championships in indoor track and field for the United States.

At the championships, schoolteacher George Young broke the world indoor record for 3 miles. 7,031 spectators attended.

== Medal summary ==
=== Men ===
Event	Gold		Silver		Bronze
60 yards	Charles Greene	6.0			
600 yards	Martin McGrady	1:12.3			
1000 yards	Herb Germann	2:08.0			
Mile run	Henryk Szordykowski (POL)	4:05.0	Martin Liquori	4:06.3	
3 miles	George Young	13:09.8			
60 yards hurdles	Willie Davenport	7.0			
High jump	John Rambo	2.08 m			
Pole vault	Peter Chen	5.03 m			
Long jump	Norm Tate	7.82 m			
Triple jump	Norm Tate	16.18 m			
Shot put	George Woods	19.49 m			
Weight throw	Al Hall	21.56 m			
1 mile walk	Dave Romansky	6:21.9			

=== Women ===
Event	Gold		Silver		Bronze	
60 yards	Barbara Ferrell	6.7				
240 yards	Barbara Ferrell	27.5				
440 yards	Jarvis Scott	56.4				
880 yards	Madeline Manning	2:07.9				
Mile run	Abby Hoffman (CAN)	4:59.3	Cheryl Bridges	5:07.0		
60 yards hurdles	Mamie Rallins	7.7				
High jump	Eleanor Montgomery	1.78 m				
Long jump (Note: The top American and U.S. champion was Martha Watson, who jumped 18 ft 7 in (5.66 m) for 4th place.)	Irena Szewinska (POL)	6.17 m	Joan Hendry (CAN)	18 ft 9 in (5.71 m)	Brenda Eisler (CAN)	18 ft 9 in (5.71 m)
Shot put	Maren Seidler	14.63 m				
Basketball throw	Mary Boron	108 ft 7 in (33.09 m)				
