= 1968 USA Indoor Track and Field Championships =

National athletics championship event

- Dates: February 23-24
- Host city: Oakland, California, United States
- Venue: Oakland–Alameda County Coliseum Arena
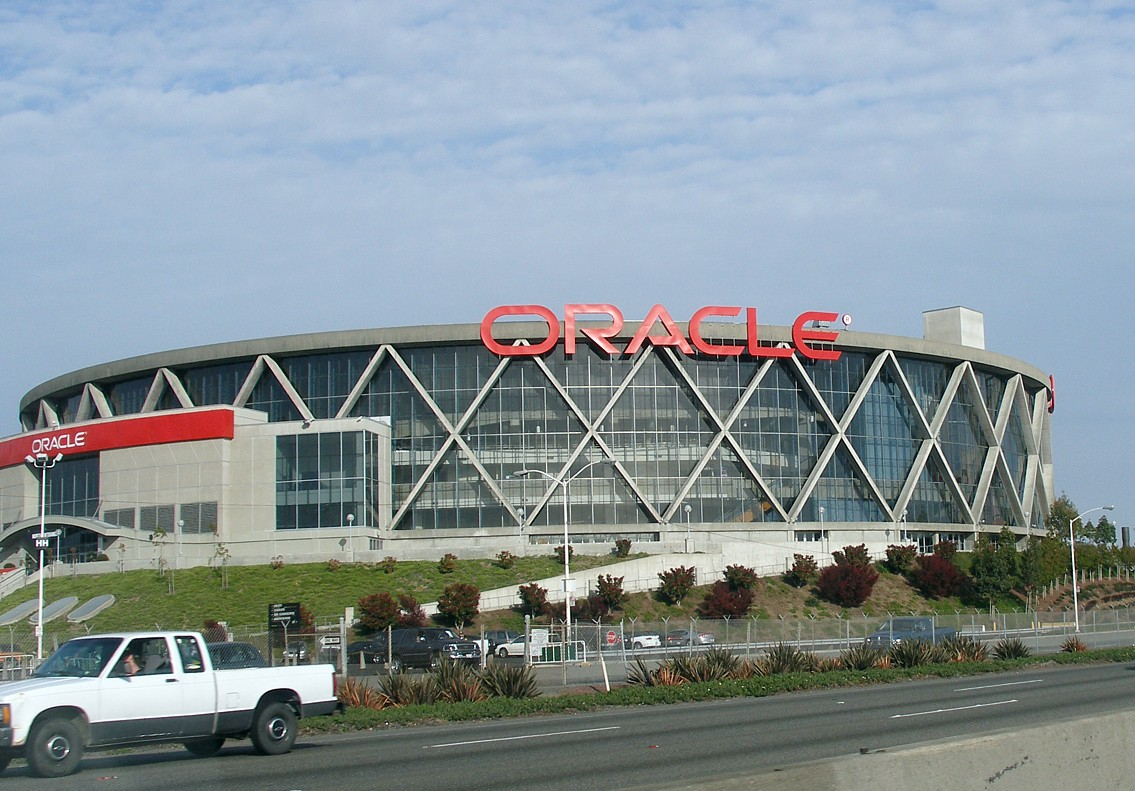
- Level: Senior
- Type: Indoor
- Events: 23 (13 men's + 10 women's)

The 1968 USA Indoor Track and Field Championships were held at the Oakland–Alameda County Coliseum Arena in Oakland, California. Organized by the Amateur Athletic Union (AAU), the competition took place on February 23-24 and served as the national championships in indoor track and field for the United States.

At the championships, pole vaulter Bob Seagren bruised his left side on a practice run when his pole broke. Despite a piece hitting near his kidney, he declined medical attention and compete anyways, though he was unable to clear 16 ft 6 in (5.02 m). There were 6,478 spectators.

== Medal summary ==
=== Men ===
Event	Gold		Silver		Bronze
60 yards	Bill Gaines	6.0			
600 yards	Martin McGrady	1:09.2			
1000 yards	Tom Von Ruden	2:10.7			
Mile run	Preston Davis	4:06.0			
3 miles	George Young	13:17.6			
60 yards hurdles	Earl McCullouch	6.9			
High jump	Valentin Gavrilov (URS)	2.16 m	Steve Kelly	7 ft 0 in (2.13 m)	
Pole vault	Dennis Phillips	5.20 m			
Long jump	Bob Beamon	8.21 m			
Triple jump	Charles Craig	16.50 m			
Shot put	George Woods	20.20 m			
Weight throw	Ed Burke	19.90 m			
1 mile walk	Ron Laird	6:16.9			

=== Women ===
Event	Gold		Silver		Bronze
60 yards	Barbara Ferrell	6.7			
220 yards	Vilma Charleton (JAM)	25.1	Nancy Beeson	25.3	
440 yards	Lois Drinkwater	56.5			
880 yards	Madeline Manning	2:11.8			
Mile run	Doris Brown	4:50.1			
60 yards hurdles	Patty Van Wolvelaere	7.4			
High jump	Eleanor Montgomery	1.79 m			
Long jump	Tatyana Talysheva (URS)	6.21 m	Martha Watson	19 ft 10 1/2 in (6.05 m)	
Shot put	Maren Seidler	14.86 m			
Basketball throw	Barbara Friedrich	135 ft 0 in (41.14 m)			
