= 1979 USA Indoor Track and Field Championships =

National athletics championship event

- Dates: February 23
- Host city: New York City, New York, United States
- Venue: Madison Square Garden
- Level: Senior
- Type: Indoor
- Events: 24 (13 men's + 11 women's)

The 1979 USA Indoor Track and Field Championships were held at Madison Square Garden in New York City, New York. Organized by the Amateur Athletic Union (AAU), the competition took place on February 23 and served as the national championships in indoor track and field for the United States.

It was the last time the championships were hosted by the AAU, with subsequent editions being held by The Athletics Congress. The competition was used to select the U.S. team for a dual meet against the Soviet Union set to be staged in Texas on March 3.

== Medal summary ==
=== Men ===
Event	Gold		Silver		Bronze	
60 yards	Steve Riddick	6.14				
600 yards	Mike Solomon (TRI)	1:12.4	Fred Sowerby (ANT)	1:12.5	Stanley Vincent	1:13.2
1000 yards	Evans White	2:08.6				
Mile run	Steve Scott	4:01.4				
3 miles	Marty Liquori	13:14.7				
60 yards hurdles	Renaldo Nehemiah	6.94				
High jump	Benn Fields	2.25 m				
Pole vault	Dan Ripley	5.51 m				
Long jump	Larry Myricks	7.97 m				
Triple jump	Ron Livers	16.70 m				
Shot put	Colin Anderson	20.56 m				
Weight throw	Ed Kania	21.76 m				
2 miles walk	Todd Scully	12:40.0				

=== Women ===
Event	Gold		Silver		Bronze
60 yards	Evelyn Ashford	6.71			
220 yards	Chandra Cheeseborough	23.93			
440 yards	June Griffith (GUY)	54.0	Yolanda Rich	54.6	
880 yards	Wendy Knudson	2:07.3			
Mile run	Francie Larrieu	4:39.2			
2 miles	Julie Brown	9:46.1			
60 yards hurdles	Candy Young	7.50			
High jump	Louise Ritter	1.85 m			
Long jump	Kathy McMillan	6.47 m			
Shot put	Beatrix Philipp (FRG)	17.34 m	Maren Seidler	56 ft 9 in (17.29 m)	
1 mile walk	Chris Shea	6:58.9			
