= 1972 USA Indoor Track and Field Championships =

National athletics championship event

- Dates: February 25
- Host city: New York City, New York, United States
- Venue: Madison Square Garden
- Level: Senior
- Type: Indoor
- Events: 22 (13 men's + 9 women's)

The 1972 USA Indoor Track and Field Championships were held at Madison Square Garden in New York City, New York. Organized by the Amateur Athletic Union (AAU), the competition took place on February 25 and served as the national championships in indoor track and field for the United States.

The meeting was used to select the U.S. team for a dual meet against the Soviet Union to be held in Richmond, Virginia on March 17. At the championships, Byron Dyce of Jamaica became the first black person to win a mile run final at Madison Square Garden.

== Medal summary ==
=== Men ===
Event	Gold		Silver		Bronze	
60 yards	Del Meriwether	6.2				
600 yards	Lee Evans	1:11.3				
1000 yards	Jozef Plachý (TCH)	2:09.8	Frank Murphy (IRL)	2:09.8	Ron Nehring	2:10.8
Mile run	Byron Dyce (JAM)	4:01.8	Audre De Hertoghe (BEL)	4:04.6	Bruce Fischer	4:05.9
3 miles	Emiel Puttemans (BEL)	13:18.4	Len Hilton	13:19.4		
60 yards hurdles	Rod Milburn	7.1				
High jump	Gene White	2.18 m				
Pole vault	Kjell Isaksson (SWE)	5.45 m	Hans Lagerqvist (SWE)	17 ft 4 in (5.28 m)	Steve Smith	17 ft 4 in (5.28 m)
Long jump	Henry Hines	7.90 m				
Triple jump	John Craft	16.56 m				
Shot put	Fred DeBernardi	20.15 m				
Weight throw	George Frenn	22.04 m				
1 mile walk	Dave Romansky	6:13.4				

=== Women ===
Event	Gold		Silver		Bronze
60 yards	Iris Davis	6.9			
220 yards	Esther Stroy	24.6			
440 yards	Kathy Hammond	54.9			
880 yards	Cheryl Toussaint	2:08.2			
Mile run	Doris Brown	4:44.0			
60 yards hurdles	Patty Johnson	7.5			
High jump	Debbie Van Kiekebelt (CAN)	1.73 m	Alice Pfaff	1.73 m	
Long jump	Martha Watson	6.39 m			
Shot put	Maren Seidler	15.53 m			
