= 1978 USA Indoor Track and Field Championships =

National athletics championship event

- Dates: February 24
- Host city: New York City, New York, United States
- Venue: Madison Square Garden
- Level: Senior
- Type: Indoor
- Events: 24 (13 men's + 11 women's)

The 1978 USA Indoor Track and Field Championships were held at Madison Square Garden in New York City, New York. Organized by the Amateur Athletic Union (AAU), the competition took place on February 24 and served as the national championships in indoor track and field for the United States.

At the championships, Houston McTear ran an electronically timed world record in the 60 yards.

== Medal summary ==
=== Men ===
Event	Gold		Silver		Bronze	
60 yards	Houston McTear	6.05				
600 yards	Stan Vinson	1:10.0				
1000 yards	Gideon Terer (KEN)	2:09.3	Bill Martin	2:09.9		
Mile run	Eamonn Coghlan (IRL)	4:01.6	Wilson Waigwa (KEN)	4:02.3	Steve Lacy	4:02.9
3 miles	Suleiman Nyambui (TAN)	13:09.2	Marty Liquori	13:11.8		
60 yards hurdles	Charles Foster	7.11				
High jump	Dwight Stones	2.25 m				
Pole vault	Larry Jessee	5.40 m				
Long jump	Charlton Ehizuelen (NGR)	7.72 m	Vesco Bradley	25 ft 2 1/4 in (7.67 m)		
Triple jump	Ron Livers	16.85 m				
Shot put	Al Feuerbach	20.65 m				
Weight throw	Ed Kania	19.73 m				
2 miles walk	Todd Scully	13:07.6				

=== Women ===
Event	Gold		Silver		Bronze
60 yards	Brenda Morehead	6.73			
220 yards	Freida Nichols (BAR)	24.23	Theresa Montgomery	24.73	
440 yards	Kim Thomas	55.30			
880 yards	Debbie Vetter	2:08.8			
Mile run	Francie Larrieu	4:37.0			
2 miles	Brenda Webb	9:55.8			
60 yards hurdles	Deby LaPlante	7.53			
High jump	Debbie Brill (CAN)	1.88 m	Joani Huntley	6 ft 1 in (1.85 m)	
Long jump	Modupe Oshikoya (NGR)	6.25 m	Kathy McMillan	20 ft 3 3/4 in (6.19 m)	
Shot put	Maren Seidler	18.59 m			
1 mile walk	Sue Brodock	7:01.7			
