= 1977 USA Indoor Track and Field Championships =

National athletics championship event

- Dates: February 25
- Host city: New York City, New York, United States
- Venue: Madison Square Garden
- Level: Senior
- Type: Indoor
- Events: 24 (13 men's + 11 women's)

The 1977 USA Indoor Track and Field Championships were held at Madison Square Garden in New York City, New York. Organized by the Amateur Athletic Union (AAU), the competition took place on February 25 and served as the national championships in indoor track and field for the United States.

The championships served as a qualifying event to make the U.S. team at a tri-meet against Canada and the Soviet Union the following week.

== Medal summary ==
=== Men ===
Event	Gold		Silver		Bronze	
60 yards	Steve Riddick	6.1				
600 yards	Fred Sowerby (ANT)	1:09.8	Kevin Prince	1:10.0		
1000 yards	Mike Boit (KEN)	2:06.9	Byron Dyce (JAM)	2:07.6	Reggie Clark	2:09.0
Mile run	Filbert Bayi (TAN)	3:59.3	Niall O'Shaughnessy (IRL)	3:59.4	Joseph Dubina	4:01.2
3 miles	Suleiman Nyambui (TAN)	13:12.9	Ibrahim Juma (TAN)	13:15.3	Garry Bjorklund	13:16.0
60 yards hurdles	Larry Shipp	7.0				
High jump	Paul Underwood	2.18 m				
Pole vault	Larry Jessee	5.41 m				
Long jump	Tommy Haynes	7.93 m				
Triple jump	Tommy Haynes	16.83 m				
Shot put	Mac Wilkins	21.06 m				
Weight throw	George Frenn	21.09 m				
2 miles walk	Todd Scully	13:02.5				

=== Women ===
Event	Gold		Silver		Bronze
60 yards	Brenda Morehead	6.6			
220 yards	Rosalyn Bryant	23.4			
440 yards	Lorna Forde (BAR)	53.6	Yolanda Rich	54.8	
880 yards	Cyndy Poor	2:06.7			
Mile run	Francie Larrieu	4:43.1			
2 miles	Francie Larrieu	9:58.2			
60 yards hurdles	Jane Frederick	7.3			
High jump	Joni Huntley	1.83 m			
Long jump	Kathy McMillan	6.51 m			
Shot put	Maren Seidler	15.94 m			
1 mile walk	Sue Brodock	7:05.9			
