= 1965 USA Indoor Track and Field Championships =

National athletics championship event

- Dates: February 19–20
- Host city: New York City, New York, United States
- Venue: Madison Square Garden
- Level: Senior
- Type: Indoor
- Events: 21 (12 men's + 9 women's)

The 1965 USA Indoor Track and Field Championships were held at Madison Square Garden in New York City, New York. Organized by the Amateur Athletic Union (AAU), the competition took place on February 19–20 and served as the national championships in indoor track and field for the United States.

It was the first time ever that the men's and women's championships were held jointly at the same venue and date—for all years previously, they were held separately. At the championships, Norma Harris and Janell Smith both ran the American record in the women's 440 yards, with the race being declared a dead heat and tie for the win. The women's 100 yards event was also dropped from the program.

== Medal summary ==
=== Men ===
| Event | Gold | | Silver | | Bronze | |
|---|---|---|---|---|---|---|
| 60 yards | Sam Perry | 6.0 | | | | |
| 600 yards | Jack Yerman | 1:11.3 | | | | |
| 1000 yards | Ted Nelson | 2:10.5 | | | | |
| Mile run | Jim Grelle | 4:07.4 | | | | |
| 3 miles | Billy Mills | 13:25.4 | | | | |
| 60 yards hurdles | Ralph Boston | 7.2 | | | | |
| High jump | Valeriy Brumel (URS) | 2.18 m | Edward Czernik (POL) | 7 ft 0 in (2.13 m) | Kjell-Åke Nilsson (SWE) | 6 ft 9 in (2.05 m) |
| High jump | Valeriy Brumel (URS) | 2.18 m | Edward Czernik (POL) | 7 ft 0 in (2.13 m) | Gene Johnson | 6 ft 9 in (2.05 m) |
| Pole vault | Billy Pemelton | 4.88 m | | | | |
| Long jump | Igor Ter-Ovanesyan (URS) | 7.98 m | Ralph Boston | 7.98 m | | |
| Shot put | John McGrath | 19.15 m | | | | |
| Weight throw | Hal Connolly | 21.35 m | | | | |
| 1 mile walk | Ron Zinn | 6:25.7 | | | | |

=== Women ===
| Event | Gold | | Silver | | Bronze | |
|---|---|---|---|---|---|---|
| 60 yards | Wyomia Tyus | 6.8 | | | | |
| 200 yards | Edith McGuire | 21.9 | | | | |
| 440 yards | Norma Harris | 56.5 | | | | |
| 440 yards | Janell Smith | 56.5 | | | | |
| 880 yards (Note: The top American and U.S. champion was Marie Mulder, who finished 4th in 2:12.8.) | Abby Hoffman (CAN) | 2:11.8 | Antie Gleichfeld (GER) | 2:11.9 | Zsuzsa Szabó (HUN) | 2:12.1 |
| 60 yards hurdles | Chi Cheng (TPE) | 7.9 | Jennie Wingerson (CAN) | NT | Tamara Davis | NT |
| High jump | Iolanda Balas (ROM) | 1.75 m | Eleanor Montgomery | 5 ft 8 in (1.72 m) | | |
| Long jump | Mary Rand (GBR) | 6.19 m | Chi Cheng (TPE) | 20 ft 2 1/4 in (6.15 m) | Martha Watson | 19 ft 4 1/2 in (5.9 m) |
| Shot put | Tamara Press (URS) | 17.43 m | Lynn Graham | 49 ft 5 in (15.06 m) | | |
| Basketball throw | Barbara Friedrich | 107 ft 11 in (32.89 m) | | | | |
