= 1975 USA Indoor Track and Field Championships =

National athletics championship event

- Dates: February 28
- Host city: New York City, New York, United States
- Venue: Madison Square Garden
- Level: Senior
- Type: Indoor
- Events: 24 (13 men's + 11 women's)

The 1975 USA Indoor Track and Field Championships were held at Madison Square Garden in New York City, New York. Organized by the Amateur Athletic Union (AAU), the competition took place on February 28 and served as the national championships in indoor track and field for the United States.

At the championships, Dwight Stones was expected to try for the 7 ft 6 in (2.28 m) world record in the high jump. The championships served as a selection event for a dual meet against the Soviet Union athletics team soon after in Richmond, Virginia. It was highlighted by foreign guests including Miruts Yifter.

The 1975 women's championships marked the first time that the two miles event was added, and the first time that any event over 1 mile was contested.

== Medal summary ==
=== Men ===
| Event | Gold | | Silver | | Bronze | |
|---|---|---|---|---|---|---|
| 60 yards | Hasely Crawford (TRI) | 6.0 | Steve Williams | 6.1 | | |
| 600 yards | Wes Williams | 1:11.2 | | | | |
| 1000 yards | Rick Wohlhuter | 2:06.4 | | | | |
| Mile run | Filbert Bayi (TAN) | 4:02.1 | Paul Cummings | 4:03.3 | | |
| 3 miles | Miruts Yifter (ETH) | 13:07.6 | Suleiman Nyambui (TAN) | 13:09.6 | Pat Manders | 13:11.2 |
| 60 yards hurdles | Charles Foster | 7.1 | | | | |
| High jump | Dwight Stones | 2.21 m | | | | |
| Pole vault | Roland Carter | 5.30 m | | | | |
| Long jump | Arnie Robinson | 8.01 m | | | | |
| Triple jump | Tommy Haynes | 16.37 m | | | | |
| Shot put | Al Feuerbach | 20.67 m | | | | |
| Weight throw | George Frenn | 21.13 m | | | | |
| 2 miles walk | Ron Daniel | 13:36.8 | | | | |

=== Women ===
| Event | Gold | | Silver | | Bronze |
|---|---|---|---|---|---|
| 60 yards | Alice Annum (GHA) | 6.6 | Angel Doyle | 6.7 | |
| 220 yards | Rosalyn Bryant | 23.6 | | | |
| 440 yards | Robin Campbell | 55.1 | | | |
| 880 yards | Kathy Weston | 2:07.6 | | | |
| Mile run | Francie Larrieu | 4:42.8 | | | |
| 2 miles | Brenda Webb | 10:22.0 | | | |
| 60 yards hurdles | Modupe Oshikoya (NGR) | 7.6 | Debby LaPolante | 7.7 | |
| High jump | Joni Huntley | 1.83 m | | | |
| Long jump | Martha Watson | 6.45 m | | | |
| Shot put | Faina Melnik (URS) | 16.94 m | Maren Seidler | 51 ft 3 in (15.62 m) | |
| 1 mile walk | Sue Brodock | 7:22.5 | | | |
