= 1973 USA Indoor Track and Field Championships =

National athletics championship event

- Dates: February 23
- Host city: New York City, New York, United States
- Venue: Madison Square Garden
- Level: Senior
- Type: Indoor
- Events: 23 (13 men's + 10 women's)

The 1973 USA Indoor Track and Field Championships were held at Madison Square Garden in New York City, New York. Organized by the Amateur Athletic Union (AAU), the competition took place on February 23 and served as the national championships in indoor track and field for the United States.

At the championships, Tracy Smith broke the world indoor record for 3 miles by just under three seconds. 15,647 spectators attended the event.

The 1973 edition was the first time that women's racewalking was added to the championships.

== Medal summary ==
=== Men ===
Event	Gold		Silver		Bronze	
60 yards	Hasely Crawford (TRI)	6.0	Herb Washington	6.0		
600 yards	Fred Newhouse	1:11.0				
1000 yards (Note: The top American was Mark Winzenried, who ran 2:10.2 for 5th place behind Andrej Kupszyk of Poland (2:09.8, 4th).)	Marcel Philippe (FRA)	2:08.8	Yevgeniy Arzhanov (URS)	2:09.5	Lennox Stewart (TTO)	2:09.8
Mile run	Marty Liquori	4:03.5				
3 miles	Tracy Smith	13:07.2				
60 yards hurdles	Rod Milburn	7.0				
High jump	Dwight Stones	2.13 m				
Pole vault	Steve Smith	5.38 m				
Long jump	Randy Williams	8.13 m				
Triple jump	John Craft	16.67 m				
Shot put	George Woods	21.27 m				
Weight throw	George Frenn	21.21 m				
1 mile walk	Ron Daniel	6:22.0				

=== Women ===
Event	Gold		Silver		Bronze	
60 yards	Iris Davis	6.6				
220 yards	Rosalyn Bryant	24.6				
440 yards	Brenda Walsh (CAN)	55.5	Kathy Hammond	55.7		
880 yards	Cheryl Toussaint	2:08.8				
Mile run	Lyudmila Bragina (URS)	4:40.0	Glenda Reiser (CAN)	4:45.1	Debbie Heald	4:46.7
60 yards hurdles	Patty Johnson	7.5				
High jump	Alice Pfaff	1.73 m				
Long jump	Irena Szewinska (POL)	6.24 m	Martha Watson	20 ft 4 1/4 in (6.2 m)		
Shot put	Jan Svendsen	15.24 m				
1 mile walk	Lynn Olson	7:39.0				
