= 1971 USA Indoor Track and Field Championships =

National athletics championship event

- Dates: February 26
- Host city: New York City, New York, United States
- Venue: Madison Square Garden
- Level: Senior
- Type: Indoor
- Events: 22 (13 men's + 9 women's)

The 1971 USA Indoor Track and Field Championships were held at Madison Square Garden in New York City, New York. Organized by the Amateur Athletic Union (AAU), the competition took place on February 26 and served as the national championships in indoor track and field for the United States.

At the championships, Frank Shorter ran the second-fastest time ever for 3 miles indoors. Field events were held separately at Columbia University.

== Medal summary ==
=== Men ===
Event	Gold		Silver		Bronze	
60 yards	Jean-Louis Ravelomanatsoa (MAD)	6.1	Charles Greene	NT, "one step behind"		
600 yards	Andrzej Badeński (POL)	1:10.7	Benedict Cayenne (TTO)	1:11.6	Tom Ulan	1:12.4
1000 yards	Tom Von Ruden	2:07.3	Frank Murphy (IRL)	2:07.4	Byron Dyce (JAM)	2:08.1
Mile run	Henryk Szordykowski (POL)	4:06.0	John Mason	4:06.1	Chuck LaBenz	4:06.4
3 miles	Frank Shorter	13:10.6	Kerry Pearce (AUS)	13:25.0	Grant McLaren (CAN)	13:18.0
60 yards hurdles	Willie Davenport	7.0				
Medley relay	Pacific Coast Club; Jay Ebel; Bob Frey; Terry Musiaka; Len van Hofwegen	1:53.9	Manhattan College	1:55.1	Only two finishing teams	
1 mile relay	Villanova University; Ken Schappert; Bob Carpenter; Greg Govan; Lamotte Hyman	3:16.9	Philadelphia Pioneer	3:17.0	Sports International	3:18.7
2 mile relay	University of Chicago; Bob O'Connor; Len Sparks; Ralph Schultz; Lowell Paul	7:28.6	New York A.C.	7:30.0	Pacific Coast Club	7:30.8
1 mile walk	Ron Laird	6:24.9	Ron Daniel	6:25.0	Larry Walker	6:26.9
High jump	Reynaldo Brown	2.18 m	Barry Shepard; Gene White	2.13 m	Not awarded	
Pole vault	Dick Railsback	5.35 m	Bob Seagren	5.28 m	Kjell Isaksson (SWE)	5.26 m
Long jump	Norm Tate	8.03 m	Stan Royster	7.86 m	Stan Whitley	7.78 m
Triple jump	Dave Smith	16.27 m	Norm Tate	16.05 m	John Craft	15.74 m
Shot put	Al Feuerbach	20.11 m	Brian Oldfield	18.20 m (?)	Ed Kohler	18.63 m (?)
Weight throw	George Frenn	21.73 m	Al Schoterman	20.52 m	Hal Connolly	20.30 m

=== Women ===
Event	Gold		Silver		Bronze	
60 yards	Pat Hawkins	6.9				
220 yards	Esther Stroy	24.2				
440 yards	Jarvis Scott	55.3				
880 yards	Abby Hoffman (CAN)	2:08.7	Cheryl Toussaint	2:09.5		
Mile run	Doris Brown	4:47.9				
60 yards hurdles	Patty Johnson (Van Wolvelaere)	7.8				
High jump	Snežana Hrepevnik (YUG)	1.84 m	Debbie Van Kiekebelt (CAN)	1.75 m	Sally Pihal	5 ft 7 in (1.7 m)
Long jump	Marilyn King	6.06 m				
Shot put	Lynette Matthews	15.13 m				
