= 1985 USA Indoor Track and Field Championships =

National athletics championship event

- Dates: February 22
- Host city: New York City, New York, United States
- Venue: Madison Square Garden
- Level: Senior
- Type: Indoor
- Events: 25 (14 men's + 11 women's)

The 1985 USA Indoor Track and Field Championships were held at Madison Square Garden in New York City, New York. Organized by The Athletics Congress (TAC), the competition took place on February 22 and served as the national championships in indoor track and field for the United States.

At the meeting, rivals Valerie Brisco-Hooks and Diane Dixon competed in different events but each set a world indoor record.

== Medal summary ==
=== Men ===
Event	Gold		Silver		Bronze
60 yards	Albert Lawrence (JAM)	6.16	Emmit King	6.16	
440 yards	Antonio McKay	47.90			
600 yards	Elvis Forde (BAR)	1:09.05	Anthony Tufariello	1:09.24	
1000 yards	Edwin Koech (KEN)	2:07.17	Ray Brown	2:07.80	
Mile run	Sydney Maree	3:54.98			
3 miles	Doug Padilla	12:57.15			
60 yards hurdles	Greg Foster	6.85			
High jump	Jim Howard	2.34 m			
Pole vault	Doug Lytle	5.61 m			
Long jump	Mike Conley	8.22 m			
Triple jump	Mike Conley	17.40 m			
Shot put	Scott Lofquist	20.70 m			
Weight throw	Jud Logan	22.74 m			
2 miles walk	Jim Heiring	12:07.5			

=== Women ===
Event	Gold		Silver		Bronze	
60 yards	Alice Brown	6.56				
220 yards	Valerie Brisco-Hooks	22.95				
440 yards	Diane Dixon	52.20				
880 yards	Cristeana Cojocaru (ROM)	2:04.15	Irina Podyalovskaya (URS)	2:04.73	Rose Monday	2:05.12
Mile run (Note: Brit McRoberts of Canada finished 4th in 4:41.13. The top American and U.S. champion was Renee Odom in 5th with a 4:41.90 time.)	Doina Melinte (ROM)	4:37.00	Fita Lovin (ROM)	4:38.12	Ravilya Agletdinova (URS)	4:39.56
2 miles	Cathy Branta	9:40.54				
60 yards hurdles	Candy Young	7.57				
High jump	Coleen Sommer	1.95 m				
Long jump	Carol Lewis	6.59 m				
Shot put	Bonnie Dasse	18.44 m				
1 mile walk	Teresa Vaill	6:58.70				
