= 1984 USA Indoor Track and Field Championships =

National athletics championship event

- Dates: February 25
- Host city: New York City, New York, United States
- Venue: Madison Square Garden
- Level: Senior
- Type: Indoor
- Events: 25 (14 men's + 11 women's)

The 1984 USA Indoor Track and Field Championships were held at Madison Square Garden in New York City, New York. Organized by The Athletics Congress (TAC), the competition took place on February 25 and served as the national championships in indoor track and field for the United States.

The meeting concluded the USA-Mobil Indoor Track and Field Grand Prix series for that year. The women's overall points winner was Stephanie Hightower, who had "no intention, no plan to run indoors this season" due to a pinched sciatic nerve.

Carl Lewis was a late entry because he did not want to enter until the meet could guarantee drug testing. He won the long jump despite fouling his first two attempts in qualification.

== Medal summary ==
=== Men ===
Event	Gold		Silver		Bronze	
60 yards	Emmit King	6.08				
440 yards	Clinton Davis	48.10				
600 yards	Mark Rowe	1:09.60				
1000 yards	Don Paige	2:08.20				
Mile run	Steve Scott	4:00.06				
3 miles	Doug Padilla	13:09.01				
60 yards hurdles	Greg Foster	6.95				
High jump	Dennis Lewis	2.31 m				
Pole vault	Sergey Bubka (URS)	5.64 m	Konstantin Volkov (URS)	5.64 m	Earl Bell	18 ft 2 in (5.53 m)
Long jump	Carl Lewis	8.50 m				
Triple jump	Ajayi Agbebaku (NGR)	16.94 m	Mike Conley	54 ft 10 in (16.71 m)		
Shot put	Augie Wolf	21.05 m				
Weight throw	Jud Logan	22.94 m				
2 miles walk	Jim Heiring	12:11.21				

=== Women ===
Event	Gold		Silver		Bronze
60 yards	Alice Brown	6.62			
220 yards	Valerie Brisco-Hooks	23.97			
440 yards	Diane Dixon	53.82			
880 yards	Lyubov Gurina (URS)	2:05.34	Robin Campbell	2:05.61	
Mile run	Brit McRoberts (CAN)	4:33.91	Jan Merrill	4:35.16	
2 miles	Cathy Branta	9:49.39			
60 yards hurdles	Stephanie Hightower	7.43			
High jump	Tamara Bykova (URS)	2.00 m	Joni Huntley	6 ft 2 1/4 in (1.88 m)	
Long jump	Carol Lewis	6.60 m			
Shot put	Meg Ritchie (GBR)	17.85 m	Regina Cavanaugh	55 ft 2 3/4 in (16.83 m)	
1 mile walk	Teresa Vaill	7:12.85			
