= 1983 USA Indoor Track and Field Championships =

National athletics championship event

- Dates: February 25
- Host city: New York City, New York, United States
- Venue: Madison Square Garden
- Level: Senior
- Type: Indoor
- Events: 25 (14 men's + 11 women's)

The 1983 USA Indoor Track and Field Championships were held at Madison Square Garden in New York City, New York. Organized by The Athletics Congress (TAC), the competition took place on February 25 and served as the national championships in indoor track and field for the United States.

At the meeting, Carl Lewis became the first athlete in 38 years to win both the long jump and a sprint event at the indoor championships.

== Medal summary ==
=== Men ===
Event	Gold		Silver		Bronze
60 yards	Carl Lewis	6.04			
440 yards	Clinton Davis	47.64			
440 yards	Cliff Wiley	47.64			
600 yards	Eugene Sanders	1:08.47			
1000 yards	Mark Belger	2:07.79			
Mile run	Eamonn Coghlan (IRL)	3:58.5	Steve Scott	3:58.99	
3 miles	Doug Padilla	13:08.00			
60 yards hurdles	Greg Foster	6.92			
High jump	Tyke Peacock	2.28 m			
Pole vault	Billy Olson	5.71 m			
Long jump	Carl Lewis	8.35 m			
Triple jump	Ajayi Agbebaku (NGR)	16.81 m	Mike Conley Sr.	54 ft 3 1/4 in (16.54 m)	
Shot put	Kevin Akins	20.64 m			
Weight throw	Robert Weir (GBR)	23.41 m	Ed Kania	72 ft 3 in (22.02 m)	
2 miles walk	Ray Sharp	12:13.33			

=== Women ===
Event	Gold		Silver		Bronze
60 yards	Evelyn Ashford	6.58			
220 yards	Chandra Cheeseborough	23.52			
440 yards	Diane Dixon	53.78			
880 yards	Delisa Walton	2:03.10			
Mile run	Darlene Beckford	4:33.29			
2 miles	Jan Merrill	9:40.46			
60 yards hurdles	Stephanie Hightower	7.36			
High jump	Louise Ritter	1.92 m			
Long jump	Carol Lewis	6.53 m			
Shot put	Ria Stalman (NED)	16.83 m	Denise Wood	54 ft 1 1/4 in (16.49 m)	
1 mile walk	Sue Brodock	7:14.67			
