= 1986 USA Indoor Track and Field Championships =

National athletics championship event

- Dates: February 28
- Host city: New York City, United States
- Venue: Madison Square Garden
- Level: Senior
- Type: Indoor
- Events: 25 (14 men's + 11 women's)

The 1986 USA Indoor Track and Field Championships were held at Madison Square Garden in New York City. Organized by The Athletics Congress (TAC), the competition took place on February 28 and served as the national championships in indoor track and field for the United States.

The meeting was also billed as a pole vault summit (then a sport only contested by men) between the United States and Soviet Union guests. The Soviet Bubka brothers, Sergey and Vasily, took the top two spots over the Americans.

== Medal summary ==
=== Men ===
Event	Gold		Silver		Bronze	
60 yards	Lee McRae	6.06				
440 yards	Antonio McKay	47.60				
600 yards	Elvis Forde (BAR)	1:08.28	Ian Morris (TTO)	1:08.90	Marcus Sanders	1:09.10
1000 yards	Johnny Gray	2:04.52				
Mile run	Marcus O'Sullivan (IRL)	3:57.27	Ray Flynn (IRL)	3:58.17	Mark Fricker	3:58.98
Mile run	Marcus O'Sullivan (IRL)	3:57.27	Ray Flynn (IRL)	3:58.17	Kevin Johnson	3:58.98
3 miles	Doug Padilla	13:05.88				
60 yards hurdles	Mark McKoy (CAN)	6.95	Al Joyner	7.12		
High jump	Jim Howard	2.34 m				
Pole vault (Note: The 4th place finisher was Pierre Quinon of France in 18 ft 4 1/2 in (5.6 m). The top American and U.S. champion, jumping the same height as Quinon, was Brad Pursley in 5th place.)	Sergey Bubka (URS)	5.95 m	Vasily Bubka (URS)	18 ft 10 1/4 in (5.74 m)	Phillipe Collet (FRA)	18 ft 8 1/4 in (5.69 m)
Long jump	Mike Conley	8.27 m				
Triple jump	Mike Conley	17.34 m				
Shot put	Gregg Tafralis	21.01 m				
Weight throw	Jud Logan	23.50 m				
2 miles walk	Jim Heiring	12:05.94				

=== Women ===
Event	Gold		Silver		Bronze	
60 yards	Jeanette Bolden	6.57				
220 yards	Marita Koch (GDR)	22.89	Grace Jackson	23.11		
440 yards	Diane Dixon	52.52				
880 yards	Sigrun Ludwigs (GDR)	2:05.93	Christiana Coiocaru (ROM)	2:06.65	Delisa Walton-Floyd	2:06.72
Mile run	Maricica Puica (ROM)	4:35.00	Dolina Melinte (ROM)	4:35.30	Josephine White	4:36.04
2 miles	Lynn Jennings	9:28.15				
60 yards hurdles	Stephanie Hightower	7.44				
High jump	Debbie Brill (CAN)	1.97 m	Andreas Bienias (GDR)	6 ft 4 in (1.93 m)	Joni Huntley	6 ft 2 1/4 in (1.88 m)
Long jump	Heike Drechsler (GDR)	7.03 m	Jackie Joyner	22 ft 10 1/2 in (6.97 m)		
Shot put	Ramona Pagel	18.33 m				
1 mile walk	Teresa Vaill	6:53.58				
