= 1976 USA Indoor Track and Field Championships =

National athletics championship event

- Dates: February 27
- Host city: New York City, New York, United States
- Venue: Madison Square Garden
- Level: Senior
- Type: Indoor
- Events: 24 (13 men's + 11 women's)

The 1976 USA Indoor Track and Field Championships were held at Madison Square Garden in New York City, New York. Organized by the Amateur Athletic Union (AAU), the competition took place on February 27 and served as the national championships in indoor track and field for the United States.

At the championships, Janice Merrill set meet records in the mile and 2-mile.

== Medal summary ==
=== Men ===
Event	Gold		Silver		Bronze
60 yards	Steve Williams	6.0			
600 yards	Fred Sowerby (ANT)	1:09.8	Stan Vinson	1:10.2	
1000 yards	Rick Wohlhuter	2:09.3			
Mile run	Filbert Bayi (TAN)	3:56.1	Paul Cummings	3:58.4	
3 miles	Suleiman Nyambui (TAN)	13:15.0	Greg Fredericks	13:15.0	
60 yards hurdles	Guy Drut (FRA)	7.0	Tom Hill	7.0	
High jump	Robert Forget (CAN)	2.21 m	Bill Knoedel	2.21 m	
Pole vault	Roland Carter	5.50 m			
Long jump	Larry Myricks	7.93 m			
Triple jump	Tommy Haynes	16.90 m			
Shot put	Terry Albritton	19.96 m			
Weight throw	Larry Hart	20.66 m			
2 miles walk	Ron Laird	13:37.0			

=== Women ===
Event	Gold		Silver		Bronze
60 yards	Lisa Hopkins	6.7			
220 yards	Pam Jiles	24.0			
440 yards	Lorna Forde (BAR)	54.6	Sharon Dabney	54.7	
880 yards	Johanna Forman	2:07.9			
Mile run	Jan Merrill	4:38.5			
2 miles	Jan Merrill	9:59.6			
60 yards hurdles	Deby LaPlante	7.7			
High jump	Julie White (CAN)	1.85 m	Pam Spencer	6 ft 0 in (1.82 m)	
Long jump	Martha Watson	6.33 m			
Shot put	Ann Turbyne	15.67 m			
1 mile walk	Sue Brodock	7:12.7			
