= 1959 USA Indoor Track and Field Championships =

National athletics championship event

- Dates: February 21 (men); January 24 (women)
- Host city: New York City, New York, United States (men); Washington, D.C., United States (women)
- Venue: Madison Square Garden (men); D.C. Armory (women)
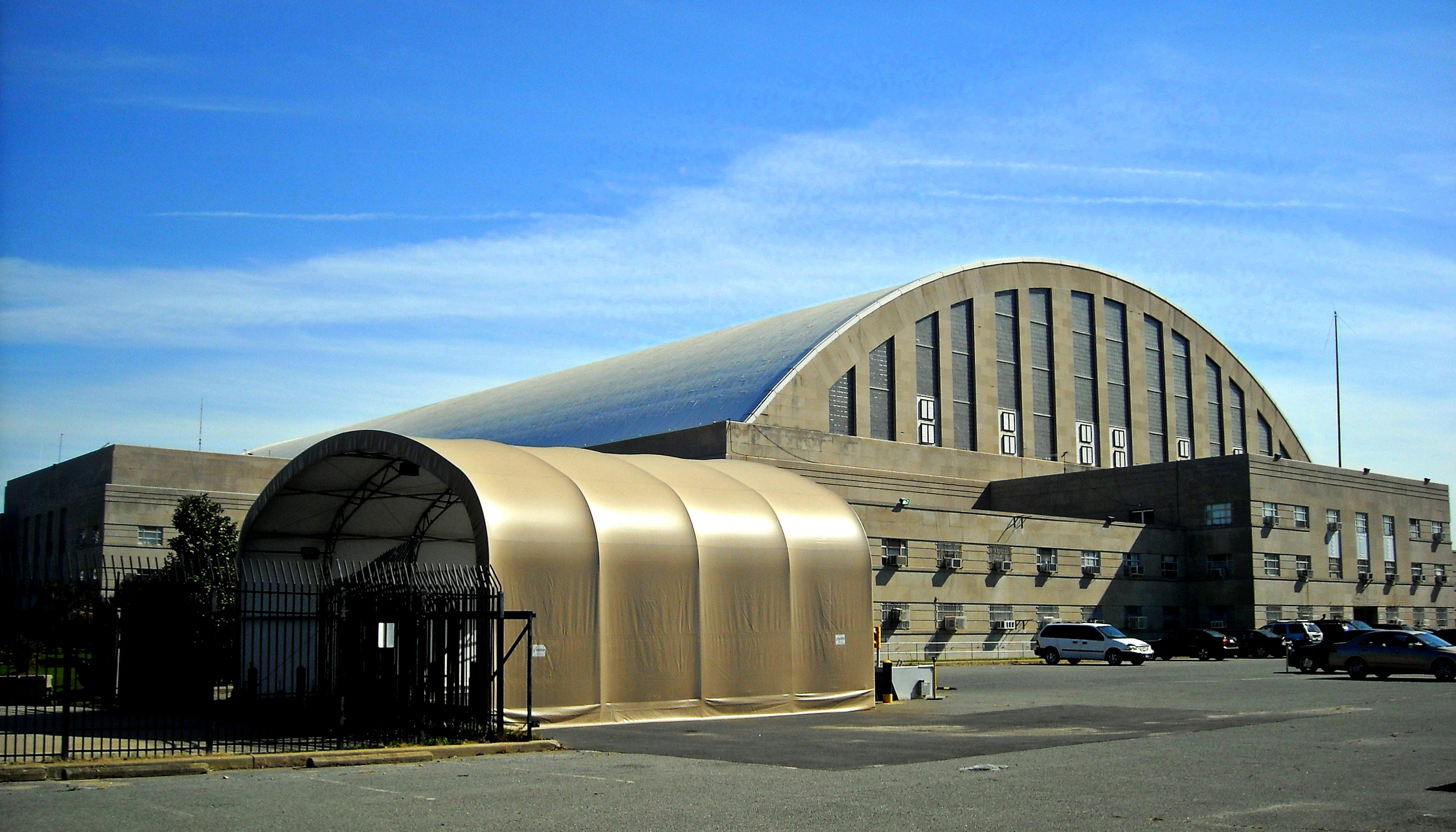
- Level: Senior
- Type: Indoor
- Events: 20 (12 men's + 8 women's)

The 1959 USA Indoor Track and Field Championships were organized by the Amateur Athletic Union (AAU) and served as the national championships in indoor track and field for the United States.

The men's edition was held at Madison Square Garden in New York City, New York, and it took place February 21. The women's meet was held separately at the D.C. Armory in Washington, D.C., taking place January 24.

At the men's championships, five world records were set including a mark of 4:02.5 in the indoor mile by Ron Delany. 15,789 spectators attended the men's edition.

After two exhibition races the prior year, it was the first time that the women's 440 yards and 880 yards were contested, and the first time that any distance longer than 220 yards was added.

== Medal summary ==
=== Men ===
Event	Gold		Silver	Bronze
60 yards	Paul Winder	6.1		
600 yards	Josh Culbreath	1:11.1		
1000 yards	Zbigniew Orywał (POL)	2:12.6	Paul Schmidt (GER)	Arnold Sowell
Mile run (Note: The top American and U.S. champion was Pete Close in 4th place.)	Ron Delany (IRL)	4:02.5	Istvan Rozsavolgyi (HUN)	Lazlo Taboi (HUN)
3 miles	Bill Dellinger	13:37.0		
60 yards hurdles	Elias Gilbert	7.3		
High jump	John Thomas	2.16 m		
Pole vault	Don Bragg	4.60 m		
Long jump	Mike Herman	7.64 m		
Shot put	Parry O'Brien	18.94 m		
Weight throw	Bob Backus	20.18 m		
1 mile walk	John Humcke	6:42.2		

=== Women ===
Event	Gold		Silver	Bronze
50 yards	Wilma Rudolph	6.2		
100 yards	Martha Hudson	11.4		
220 yards	Lucinda Williams	26.6		
440 yards	Lillian Greene	63.4		
880 yards	Harriet Douthitt	2:36.3		
70 yards hurdles	Jo Ann Terry	9.7		
High jump	Ann Marie Flynn	1.54 m		
Standing long jump	Jo Ann Terry	2.71 m		
Shot put	Marjorie Larney	12.07 m		
Basketball throw	Amelia Wood	101 ft 8 1/2 in (31 m)		
