= 1980 USA Indoor Track and Field Championships =

National athletics championship event

- Dates: February 29
- Host city: New York City, New York, United States
- Venue: Madison Square Garden
- Level: Senior
- Type: Indoor
- Events: 24 (13 men's + 11 women's)

The 1980 USA Indoor Track and Field Championships were held at Madison Square Garden in New York City, New York. Organized by The Athletics Congress (TAC), the competition took place on February 29 and served as the national championships in indoor track and field for the United States.

The championships were the first ever held by TAC, having been organized by the Amateur Athletic Union previously. At the competition, Eamonn Coghlan broke the U.S. all-comer's record for 3 miles. There was also a meeting held where 40 U.S. athletes voted unanimously against the United States boycott of the 1980 Summer Olympics.

== Medal summary ==
=== Men ===
Event	Gold		Silver		Bronze	
60 yards	Curtis Dickey	6.09				
600 yards	Mark Enyeart	1:09.2				
1000 yards	Bill Martin	2:07.7				
Mile run	Craig Masback	4:02.2				
3 miles	Eamonn Coghlan (IRL)	13:02.8	Tony Staynings (GBR)	13:03.7	Bruce Bickford	13:06.7
60 yards hurdles	Rod Milburn	7.09				
High jump	Franklin Jacobs	2.25 m				
Pole vault	Earl Bell	5.54 m				
Long jump	Larry Myricks	8.21 m				
Triple jump	Ron Livers	16.80 m				
Shot put	Jesse Stuart	20.24 m				
Weight throw	Ed Kania	22.15 m				
2 miles walk	Todd Scully	12:35.1				

=== Women ===
Event	Gold		Silver	Bronze
60 yards	Evelyn Ashford	6.76		
220 yards	Wanda Hooker	24.0		
440 yards	Rosalyn Bryant	53.92		
880 yards	Madeline Manning	2:04.5		
Mile run	Maggie Keyes	4:39.3		
2 miles	Cindy Bremser	9:45.0		
60 yards hurdles	Stephanie Hightower	7.4		
High jump	Louise Ritter	1.90 m		
Long jump	Pat Johnson	6.38 m		
Shot put	Maren Seidler	17.39 m		
1 mile walk	Sue Brodock	7:06.9		
