= Patricia Johnson =

Patricia Johnson may refer to:

- Patricia Johnson (mezzo-soprano) (1929–2024), English operatic mezzo-soprano
- Patricia Altenbernd Johnson (born 1945), professor of philosophy at University of Dayton
- Mark A. Michaels and Patricia Johnson (born 1959 and 1964), writers on sexuality and relationships
- Trish Johnson (born 1966), English professional golfer
- Patricia J. Johnson, professor at UCLA
- Patty Van Wolvelaere or Patty Johnson (born 1950), American hurdler
- Patricia Johnson, Miss North Carolina for 1969
- Pat Johnson (long jumper) (born 1960), winner of the women's long jump at the 1980 USA Indoor Track and Field Championships

== See also ==
- Patricia Johnston, lyricist "I'll Remember April"
- Pat Johnson (disambiguation)
