= 1981 USA Indoor Track and Field Championships =

National athletics championship event

- Dates: February 27
- Host city: New York City, New York, United States
- Venue: Madison Square Garden
- Level: Senior
- Type: Indoor
- Events: 25 (14 men's + 11 women's)

The 1981 USA Indoor Track and Field Championships were held at Madison Square Garden in New York City, New York. Organized by The Athletics Congress (TAC), the competition took place on February 27 and served as the national championships in indoor track and field for the United States.

At the meeting, Eamonn Coghlan missed the world record in the men's 3 miles by just 0.2 seconds.

== Medal summary ==
=== Men ===
Event	Gold		Silver		Bronze	
60 yards	Stanley Floyd	6.15				
440 yards	Ed Yearwood	48.12				
600 yards	Mike Solomon (TRI)	1:10.31	Fred Sowerby (ANT)	1:10.43	Mark Enyeart	1:10.59
1000 yards	Bill Martin	2:08.37				
Mile run	Steve Scott	3:57.3				
3 miles	Eamonn Coghlan (IRL)	12:54.80	Dick Buerkle	12:58.00		
60 yards hurdles	Alejandro Casañas (CUB)	7.14	Rod Milburn	7.18		
High jump	Jeff Woodard	2.33 m				
Pole vault	Thierry Vigneron (FRA)	5.60 m	Philippe Houvion (FRA)	5.60 m	Dan Ripley	17 ft 8 3/4 in (5.4 m)
Long jump	Larry Myricks	8.13 m				
Triple jump	Mike Marlow	16.62 m				
Shot put	Brian Oldfield	21.13 m				
Weight throw	Ed Kania	22.35 m				
2 miles walk	Ray Sharp	12:37.65				

=== Women ===
Event	Gold		Silver		Bronze
60 yards	Evelyn Ashford	6.63			
220 yards	Chandra Cheeseborough	23.27			
440 yards	Diane Dixon	55.38			
880 yards	Delisa Walton	2:05.1			
Mile run	Jan Merrill	4:34.00			
2 miles	Francie Larrieu	9:38.1			
60 yards hurdles	Benita Fitzgerald	7.72			
High jump	Joni Huntley	1.86 m			
Long jump	Ana Alexander (CUB)	6.34 m	Carol Lewis	20 ft 9 1/4 in (6.33 m)	
Shot put	Marita Walton (IRL)	16.13 m	Denise Wood	52 ft 7 in (16.02 m)	
1 mile walk	Sue Liers	7:05.0			
