= 1990 USA Indoor Track and Field Championships =

National athletics championship event

- Dates: February 23
- Host city: New York City, New York, United States
- Venue: Madison Square Garden
- Level: Senior
- Type: Indoor
- Events: 26 (14 men's + 12 women's)

The 1990 USA Indoor Track and Field Championships were held at Madison Square Garden in New York City, New York. Organized by The Athletics Congress (TAC), the competition took place on February 23 and served as the national championships in indoor track and field for the United States.

Weight throw and shot put events were contested at Princeton University. At the meeting, Lynn Jennings came from behind to win the women's 3000 m in a new American indoor record.

== Medal summary ==
=== Men ===
Event	Gold		Silver		Bronze
55 m	Brian Cooper	6.07			
55 m	Tony Dees	6.07			
400 m	Michael Johnson	47.43			
500 m	Dave Patrick	1:02.52			
800 m	Ray Brown	1:47.52			
Mile run	Marcus O'Sullivan (IRL)	3:57.35			
Mile run	Steve Scott	3:57.35			
3000 m	Doug Padilla	7:50.27			
55 m hurdles	Tony Dees	7.03			
High jump	Hollis Conway	2.35 m			
Pole vault	István Bagyula (HUN)	5.70 m	Tim Bright	5.70 m	
Long jump	Larry Myricks	8.04 m			
Triple jump	Kenny Harrison	16.76 m			
Shot put	Randy Barnes	19.95 m			
Weight throw	Lance Deal	23.78 m			
5000 m walk	Tim Berrett (GBR)	19:42.90	Doug Fournier	20:08.40	

=== Women ===
Event	Gold		Silver		Bronze	
55 m	Michelle Finn	6.61				
200 m	Grace Jackson (JAM)	23.53	Angela Williams (TTO)	23.57	Lamonda Miller	23.94
400 m	Diane Dixon	53.50				
800 m	Joetta Clark	2:04.32				
Mile run	Doina Melinte (ROM)	4:27.62	PattiSue Plumer	4:31.29		
3000 m	Lynn Jennings	8:40.45				
55 m hurdles	LaVonna Martin	7.44				
High jump	Jan Wohlschlag	1.93 m				
Long jump	Jacinta Bartholomew (GRN)	6.46 m	Lashawn Simmons	20 ft 8 1/2 in (6.31 m)		
Shot put	Ramona Pagel	18.40 m				
Weight throw	Virginia Young	18.28 m				
3000 m walk	Teresa Vaill	12:53.17				
