= Greg West =

Greg West may refer to:

- Greg West (cricketer) (born 1994), Australian cricketer
- Greg West (singer), contestant on the UK TV series The X Factor
- Greg West (Home and Away)
- Greg West (skeleton racer)
- Greg West (pole vaulter), winner of the 1993 USA Indoor Track and Field Championships
