= Pat Johnson =

Pat Johnson may refer to:

- Pat E. Johnson (1939–2023), martial artist
- Pat Johnson (singer), 1970s R&B, soul singer
- Pat Johnson (rugby union) (born 1960), American rugby union player
- Short for Patricia Johnson, multiple people:
  - Pat Johnson (long jumper) (born 1960), Wisconsin Badgers athlete and winner of the women's long jump at the 1980 USA Indoor Track and Field Championships
  - Pat Johnson (hurdler) (born 1950), American hurdler now known as Patty Van Wolvelaere

== See also ==
- Patrick Johnson (disambiguation)
- Patricia Johnson (disambiguation)
