= Lisa Hopkins =

Lisa Hopkins may refer to:

- Lisa Hopkins Seegmiller, American classical singer and actress
- Lisa Hopkins (politician), American politician from West Virginia
- Lisa Hopkins (sprinter) (born 1958), winner of the 60 yards at the 1976 USA Indoor Track and Field Championships
