= Michael Marlow =

Michael Marlow may refer to:

- Michael Marlow (priest)
- Michael Marlow (economist)
- Mike Marlow, winner of the triple jump at the 1981 USA Indoor Track and Field Championships
