= 1992 USA Indoor Track and Field Championships =

National athletics championship event

- Dates: February 28
- Host city: New York City, New York, United States
- Venue: Madison Square Garden
- Level: Senior
- Type: Indoor
- Events: 27 (14 men's + 13 women's)

The 1992 USA Indoor Track and Field Championships were held at the Madison Square Garden in New York City, New York. Organized by The Athletics Congress (TAC), the competition took place on February 28 and served as the national championships in indoor track and field for the United States.

This was the last edition of the meeting held by The Athletics Congress, with all future editions being held by USA Track & Field. At the meeting, Leroy Burrell came from behind to set a meeting record in the 60 m of 6.55.

== Medal summary ==
=== Men ===
| Event | Gold | | Silver | | Bronze | |
|---|---|---|---|---|---|---|
| 60 m | Leroy Burrell | 6.55 | | | | |
| 400 m | Willie Caldwell | 48.00 | | | | |
| 500 m | Mark Everett | 1:00.19 | | | | |
| 800 m | Freddie Williams (CAN) | 1:47.91 | William Tanui (KEN) | 1:48.47 | Ray Brown | 1:49.68 |
| Mile run (Note: The top four finishers (Morceli, Kiptanui, Kibet, and Ireland's Marcus O'Sullivan in 4:00.81) were all foreign guests. The top American and U.S. champion was Jeff Atkinson in 5th, who ran 4:01.03.) | Noureddine Morceli (ALG) | 3:59.45 | Moses Kiptanui (KEN) | 4:00.23 | David Kibet (KEN) | 4:00.23 |
| 3000 m | Doug Padilla | 7:49.14 | | | | |
| 60 m hurdles | Tony Dees | 7.51 | | | | |
| High jump | Hollis Conway | 2.30 m | | | | |
| Pole vault | Dean Starkey | 5.70 m | | | | |
| Long jump | Carl Lewis | 8.35 m | | | | |
| Triple jump | Mike Conley | 16.98 m | | | | |
| Shot put | Ron Backes | 20.54 m | | | | |
| Weight throw | Lance Deal | 24.67 m | | | | |
| 5000 m walk | Gary Morgan | 19:55.6 | | | | |

=== Women ===
| Event | Gold | | Silver | | Bronze |
|---|---|---|---|---|---|
| 60 m | Michelle Finn | 7.07 | | | |
| 200 m | Dyan Webber | 23.69 | | | |
| 400 m | Diane Dixon | 53.16 | | | |
| 800 m | Maria Mutola (MOZ) | 2:01.49 | Meredith Rainey | 2:01.86 | |
| Mile run | Lynn Jennings | 4:37.39 | | | |
| 3000 m | Shelly Steely | 8:51.29 | | | |
| 60 m hurdles | Jackie Joyner-Kersee | 8.07 | | | |
| High jump | Angie Bradburn | 1.96 m | | | |
| Long jump | Jackie Joyner-Kersee | 6.84 m | | | |
| Triple jump | Claudia Haywood | 12.94 m | | | |
| Shot put | Connie Price-Smith | 18.46 m | | | |
| Weight throw | Sonja Fitts | 19.15 m | | | |
| 3000 m walk | Debbi Lawrence | 12:47.51 | | | |
