= 2002 USA Indoor Track and Field Championships =

- Dates: March 1–2
- Host city: New York City, New York, United States
- Venue: Fort Washington Avenue Armory
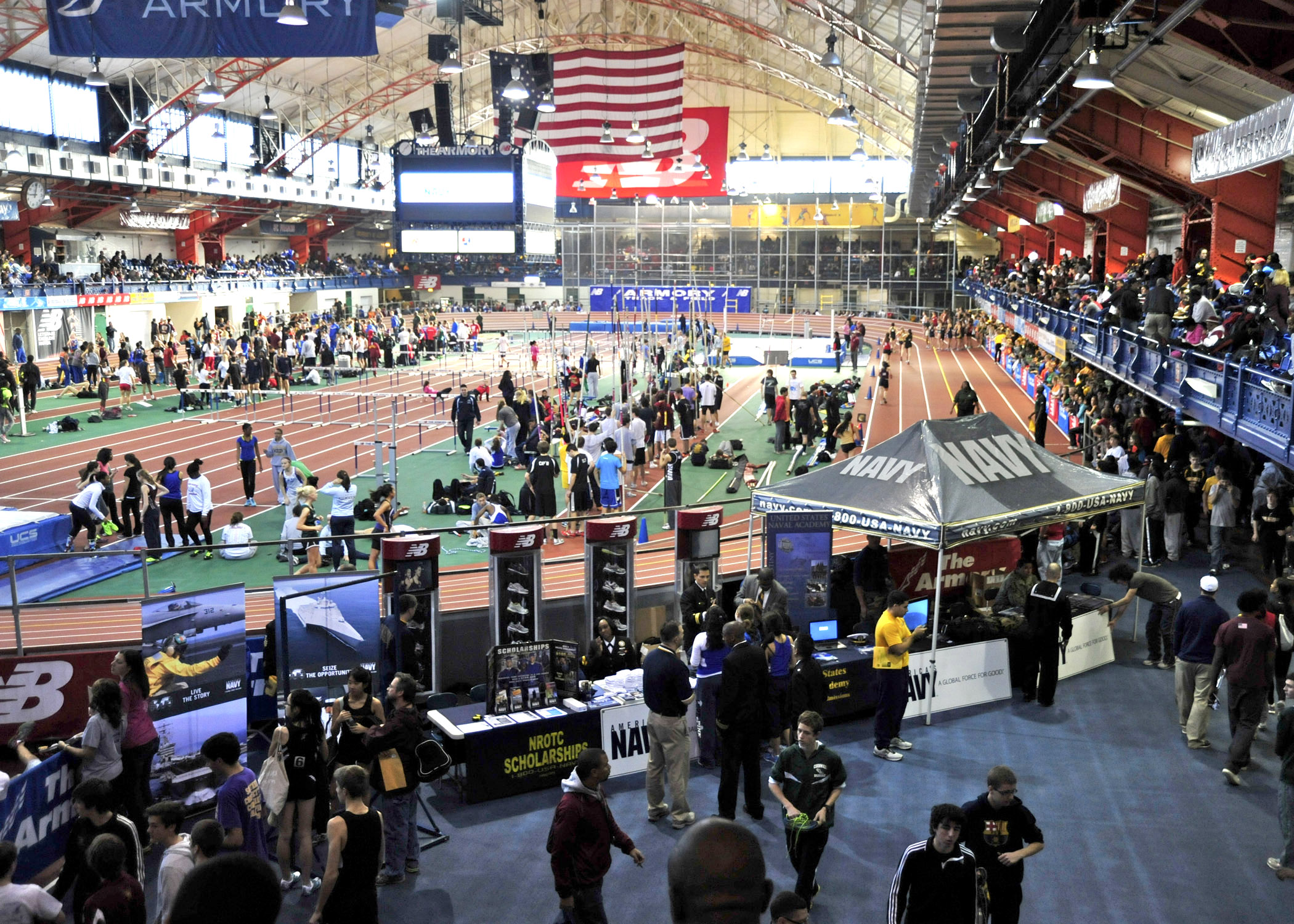
- Level: Senior
- Type: Indoor
- Events: 29 (15 men's + 14 women's)

The 2002 USA Indoor Track and Field Championships were held at the Fort Washington Avenue Armory in New York City, New York. Organized by USA Track and Field (USATF), the two-day competition took place March 1–2 and served as the national championships in indoor track and field for the United States. The championships in combined track and field events were held at a different time.

At the meeting, Regina Jacobs won the mile in 4:32.13 after running a 14:44.11 3-mile world best earlier in the season.

== Medal summary ==
=== Men ===
Event	Gold		Silver	Bronze
60 m	Terrence Trammell	6.56		
200 m	Shawn Crawford	20.49		
400 m	Brandon Couts	46.73		
800 m	Derrick Peterson	1:46.60		
Mile run	Jason Lunn	3:57.45		
3000 m	Tim Broe	7:50.09		
60 m hurdles	Allen Johnson	7.45		
High jump	Nathan Leeper	2.32 m		
Pole vault	Tim Mack	5.72 m		
Long jump	Miguel Pate	8.59 m		
Triple jump	Tim Rusan	17.01 m		
Shot put	Adam Nelson	21.57 m		
Weight throw	John McEwen	21.11 m		
Heptathlon	Tom Pappas	6113 pts		
5000 m walk	Tim Seaman	19:46.40		

=== Women ===
Event	Gold		Silver	Bronze
60 m	Chryste Gaines	7.13		
200 m	Willisa Heintz	23.75		
400 m	Monique Hennagan	52.97		
800 m	Nicole Teter	1:58.71		
Mile run	Regina Jacobs	4:32.13		
3000 m	Amy Rudolph	8:58.18		
60 m hurdles	Melissa Morrison	7.91		
High jump	Tisha Waller	1.93 m		
Pole vault	Mary Sauer	4.36 m		
Long jump	Grace Upshaw	6.41 m		
Triple jump	Vanitta Kinard	13.62 m		
Shot put	Teri Steer (Tunks)	18.00 m		
Weight throw	Anna Mahon	23.33 m		
3000 m walk	Joanne Dow	13:05.72		
