= 1996 USA Indoor Track and Field Championships =

National athletics championship event

- Dates: March 1–2
- Host city: Atlanta, Georgia, United States
- Venue: Georgia Dome
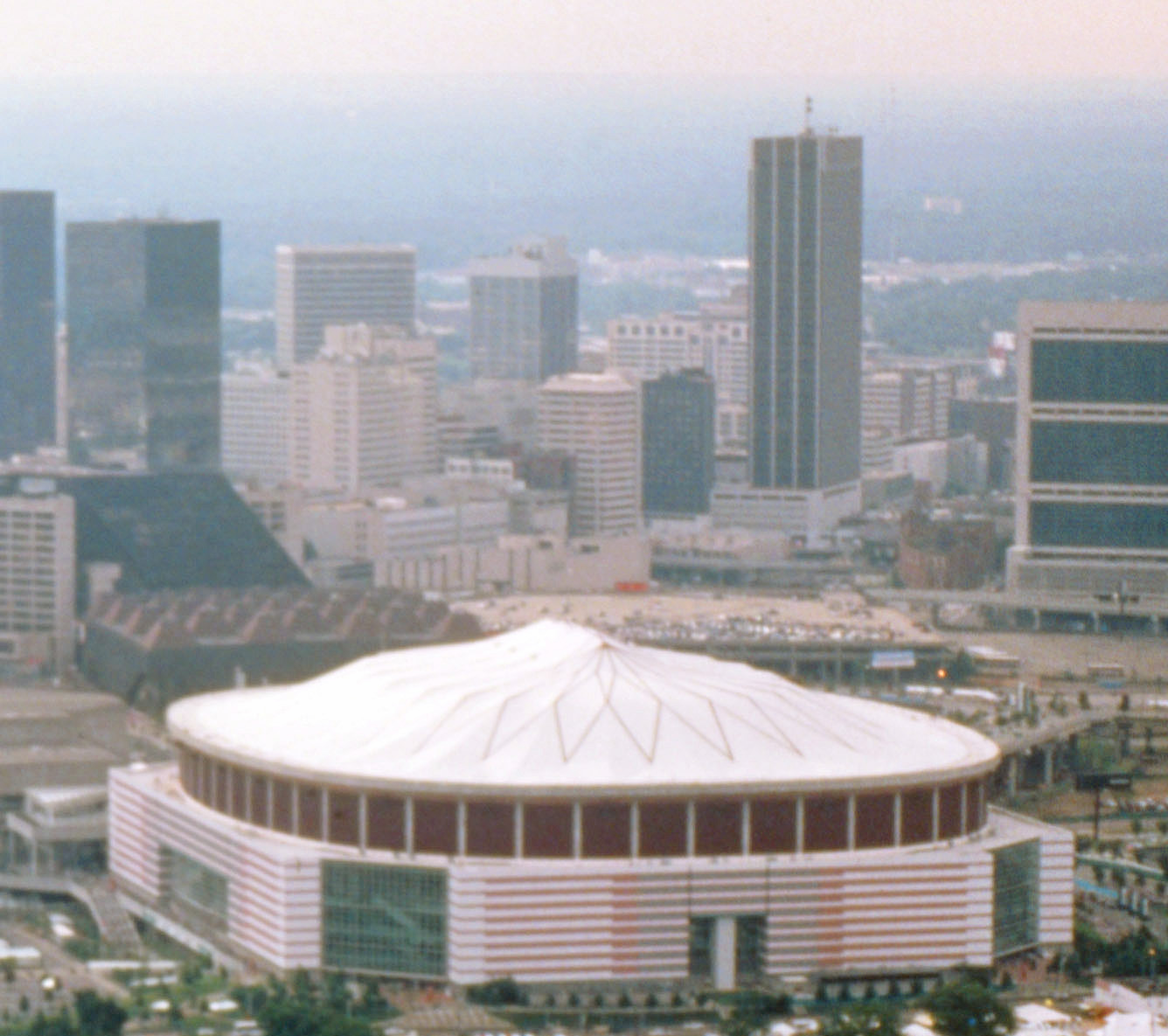
- Level: Senior
- Type: Indoor
- Events: 28 (14 men's + 14 women's)

The 1996 USA Indoor Track and Field Championships were held at the Georgia Dome in Atlanta, Georgia. Organized by USA Track and Field (USATF), the two-day competition took place March 1–2 and served as the national championships in indoor track and field for the United States. The championships in combined track and field events were held at a different date.

At the meeting, Leroy Burrell injured his left hamstring allowing foreign guest Donovan Powell of Jamaica to win the men's 60 m.

== Medal summary ==
=== Men ===
Event	Gold		Silver		Bronze
60 m	Donovan Powell (JAM)	6.55	Keith Williams	6.56	
200 m	Kevin Little	20.46			
400 m	Michael Johnson	44.66			
800 m	Brandon Rock	1:48.71			
Mile run	Steve Holman	3:57.72			
3000 m	Bob Kennedy	7:47.41			
60 m hurdles	Courtney Hawkins	7.46			
High jump	Charles Austin	2.37 m			
Pole vault	Pat Manson	5.70 m			
Long jump	Erick Walder	8.10 m			
Triple jump	LaMark Carter	17.12 m			
Shot put	John Godina	20.36 m			
Weight throw	Lance Deal	25.48 m			
5000 m walk	Allen James	20:02.59			
Heptathlon	Steve Fritz	6213 pts			

=== Women ===
Event	Gold		Silver		Bronze
60 m	Gwen Torrence	7.05			
200 m	Gwen Torrence	22.33			
400 m	Maicel Malone	51.49			
800 m	Joetta Clark	2:00.90			
Mile run	Stephanie Best	4:34.67			
3000 m	Joan Nesbit	8:56.01			
60 m hurdles	Michelle Freeman (JAM)	7.91	Tonya Lawson	7.98	
High jump	Tisha Waller	1.99 m			
Pole vault	Stacy Dragila	4.10 m			
Long jump	Shana Williams	6.79 m			
Triple jump	Sheila Hudson	14.21 m			
Shot put	Connie Price-Smith	18.82 m			
Weight throw	Dawn Ellerbe	19.84 m			
3000 m walk	Michelle Rohl	12:55.90			
Pentathlon	Marla Runyan	4151 pts			
