= Patrick Johnston =

Patrick Johnston may refer to:

- Patrick Johnston (Canadian politician), Canadian administrator and former politician
- Patrick Johnston (American politician) (born 1946), former Democratic state legislator in the State of California
- Patrick Johnston (medieval courtier), Scottish courtier and producer of plays
- Patrick G. Johnston (1958–2017), Northern Irish academic; vice-chancellor of Queens University Belfast, 2014-2017
- Sir Patrick Johnston (Scottish politician), Scottish merchant and politician

== See also ==
- Patrick Johnson (disambiguation)
- Patrick Johnstone, a Canadian municipal politician
