= 1997 USA Indoor Track and Field Championships =

- Dates: February 28–March 1
- Host city: Atlanta, Georgia, United States
- Venue: Georgia Dome
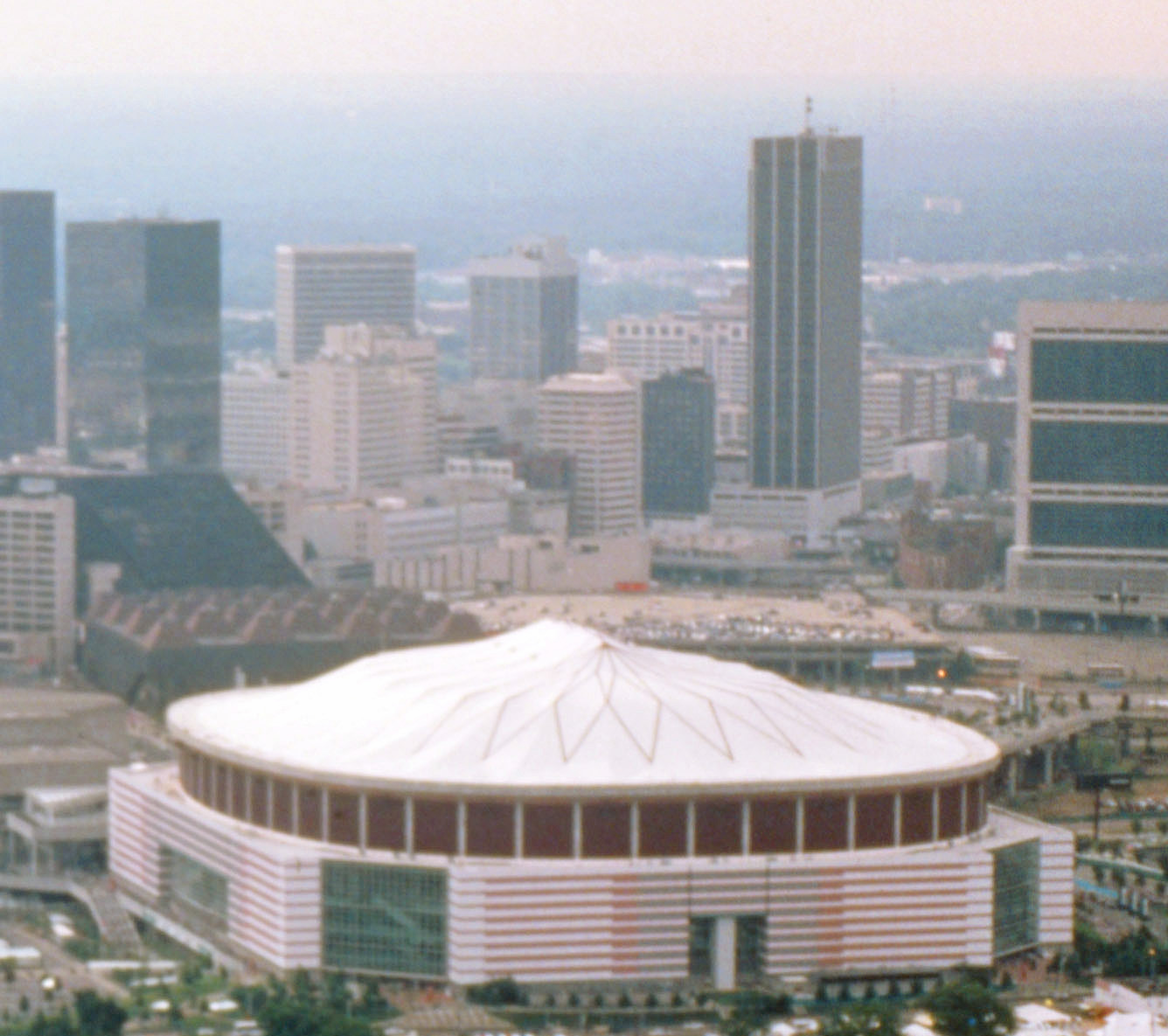
- Level: Senior
- Type: Indoor
- Events: 28 (14 men's + 14 women's)

The 1997 USA Indoor Track and Field Championships were held at the Georgia Dome in Atlanta, Georgia. Organized by USA Track and Field (USATF), the two-day competition took place February 28–March 1 and served as the national championships in indoor track and field for the United States. The championships in combined track and field events were held at a different date.

The competition was a qualifier for the U.S. team at the 1997 World Indoor Championships in Athletics. At the meeting, Mark Everett won the men's 800 m despite a plan from his rivals to work together against him.

== Medal summary ==
=== Men ===
Event	Gold		Silver	Bronze
60 m	Randall Evans	6.49		
200 m	Rohsaan Griffin	20.51		
400 m	Derek Mills	46.09		
800 m	Mark Everett	1:48.25		
Mile run	Jason Pyrah	4:00.18		
3000 m	Todd Williams	7:50.49		
60 m hurdles	Reggie Torian	7.49		
High jump	Charles Austin	2.31 m		
Pole vault	Lawrence Johnson	5.85 m		
Long jump	Erick Walder	8.16 m		
Triple jump	LaMark Carter	17.06 m		
Shot put	John Godina	20.64 m		
Weight throw	Jud Logan	22.57 m		
5000 m walk	Allen James	20:07.98		
Heptathlon	Ricky Barker	5969 pts		

=== Women ===
Event	Gold		Silver	Bronze
60 m	Gail Devers	7.00		
200 m	Tameka Roberts	23.27		
400 m	Jearl Miles Clark	51.31		
800 m	Joetta Clark	2:00.86		
1500 m	Mary Slaney	4:03.08		
3000 m	Amy Rudolph	9:01.27		
60 m hurdles	Cheryl Dickey	7.91		
High jump	Angie Spangler (Bradburn)	1.92 m		
Pole vault	Stacy Dragila	4.00 m		
Long jump	Dawn Burrell	6.52 m		
Triple jump	Cynthea Rhodes	13.84 m		
Shot put	Valeyta Althouse	18.86 m		
Weight throw	Dawn Ellerbe	21.34 m		
3000 m walk	Debbi Lawrence	13:14.24		
