= 1988 USA Indoor Track and Field Championships =

National athletics championship event

- Dates: February 26
- Host city: New York City, New York, United States
- Venue: Madison Square Garden
- Level: Senior
- Type: Indoor
- Events: 25 (14 men's + 11 women's)

The 1988 USA Indoor Track and Field Championships were held at Madison Square Garden in New York City, New York. Organized by The Athletics Congress (TAC), the competition took place on February 26 and served as the national championships in indoor track and field for the United States.

At the meeting, Gwen Torrence barely extended her undefeated streak to 40 races. Though she initially thought she won the 55 metres, after the competition ended it was announced her race with Evelyn Ashford was actually a dead heat.

There was also an anti-South African apartheid rally held outside the venue. The rally was held by six organizations in opposition to Mobil's title sponsorship of the event.

== Medal summary ==
=== Men ===
Event	Gold		Silver		Bronze	
55 m	Emmit King	6.06				
400 m	Antonio McKay	46.55				
500 m	Ken Lowery	1:02.60				
800 m	Ray Brown	1:47.66				
Mile run	Marcus O'Sullivan (IRL)	3:59.85	Brian Abshire	4:00.73		
3000 m	Jim Spivey	7:52.91	Mark Junkermann	7:54.00		
55 m hurdles	Greg Foster	6.93				
High jump	Igor Paklin (URS)	2.29 m	Jim Howard	2.29 m		
High jump	Igor Paklin (URS)	2.29 m	Thomas McCants	2.29 m		
Pole vault	Rodion Gataullin (URS)	5.64 m	Dave Kenworthy	5.64 m		
Long jump	Larry Myricks	8.24 m				
Triple jump	Ray Kimble	17.15 m				
Shot put	Ron Backes	20.82 m				
Weight throw	Walter Ciofani (FRA)	23.11 m	Tore Gustafsson (SWE)	71 ft 7 1/4 in (21.82 m)	Pat Egan	69 ft 7 1/2 in (21.22 m)
5000 m walk	Guillaume Leblanc (CAN)	18:53.25	Tim Lewis	19:51.05		

=== Women ===
Event	Gold		Silver		Bronze	
55 m	Evelyn Ashford	6.66				
55 m	Gwen Torrence	6.66				
200 m	Grace Jackson (JAM)	23.07	Natalya Pomoshchnikova (URS)	23.38	Terri Dendy	23.93
400 m	Diane Dixon	52.51				
800 m	Mitica Constantin (ROM)	2:03.27	Joetta Clark	2:03.41		
Mile run	Doina Melinte (ROM)	4:36.68	Alisa Harvey	4:39.61		
3000 m	Sabrina Dornhoefer	9:03.59				
55 m hurdles	Julie Rocheleau (CAN)	7.40	Lynda Tolbert	7.50		
High jump	Louise Ritter	1.93 m				
Long jump	Sheila Echols	6.40 m				
Shot put	Ramona Pagel	18.67 m				
3000 m walk	Maryanne Torrellas	12:45.38				
