= 1991 USA Indoor Track and Field Championships =

National athletics championship event

- Dates: February 22
- Host city: New York City, New York, United States
- Venue: Madison Square Garden
- Level: Senior
- Type: Indoor
- Events: 27 (14 men's + 13 women's)

The 1991 USA Indoor Track and Field Championships were held at the Madison Square Garden in New York City, New York. Organized by The Athletics Congress (TAC), the competition took place on February 22 and served as the national championships in indoor track and field for the United States.

The competition was the qualifier for the U.S. team at the 1991 World Indoor Championships in Athletics. At the meeting, Diane Dixon won her 10th national indoor title, equaling racewalker Henry Laskau for most wins at the indoor championships. It was also the first time that the women's triple jump was contested.

A separate United States World Indoor Sprint Trials were held at Harvard University to decide the sprint and relay teams for the 1991 World Indoor Championships.

== Medal summary ==
=== Men ===
Event	Gold		Silver		Bronze	
60 m	Andrés Simón (CUB)	6.58	Andre Carson	6.60		
400 m	Michael Johnson	46.70				
500 m	Andrew Valmon	1:04.21				
800 m	Ray Brown	1:48.68				
Mile run	Noureddine Morceli (ALG)	3:52.99	Marcus O'Sullivan (IRL)	3:58.62	Eric Henry	3:58.72
3000 m	Terry Brahm	7:50.08				
60 m hurdles	Greg Foster	7.49				
High jump	Javier Sotomayor (CUB)	2.30 m	Hollis Conway	2.30 m		
Pole vault	Kory Tarpenning	5.60 m				
Long jump	Llewellyn Starks	8.04 m				
Triple jump (Note: There was a tie for longest jump, but Rutherford's second-longest jump was better than Simpkins'.)	Frank Rutherford (BAH)	16.67 m	Charlie Simpkins	16.67 m		
Shot put	Ron Backes	20.45 m				
Weight throw	Lance Deal	24.17 m				
5000 m walk	Doug Fournier	20:03.74				

=== Women ===
Event	Gold		Silver		Bronze
60 m	Michelle Finn	7.16			
200 m	Rochelle Stevens	23.65			
400 m	Diane Dixon	52.38			
800 m	Meredith Rainey	2:03.07			
Mile run	Suzy Favor	4:37.55			
3000 m	Margareta Keszeg (ROM)	8:49.61	PattiSue Plumer	8:55.37	
60 m hurdles	Kim McKenzie	8.12			
High jump	Yolanda Henry	1.96 m			
Long jump	Carol Lewis	6.56 m			
Triple jump	Juliana Yendork	13.12 m			
Shot put	Connie Price-Smith	18.86 m			
Weight throw	Sonja Fitts	18.18 m			
3000 m walk	Teresa Vaill	12:49.95			
