= 1995 USA Indoor Track and Field Championships =

National athletics championship event

- Dates: March 3–4
- Host city: Atlanta, Georgia, United States
- Venue: Georgia Dome
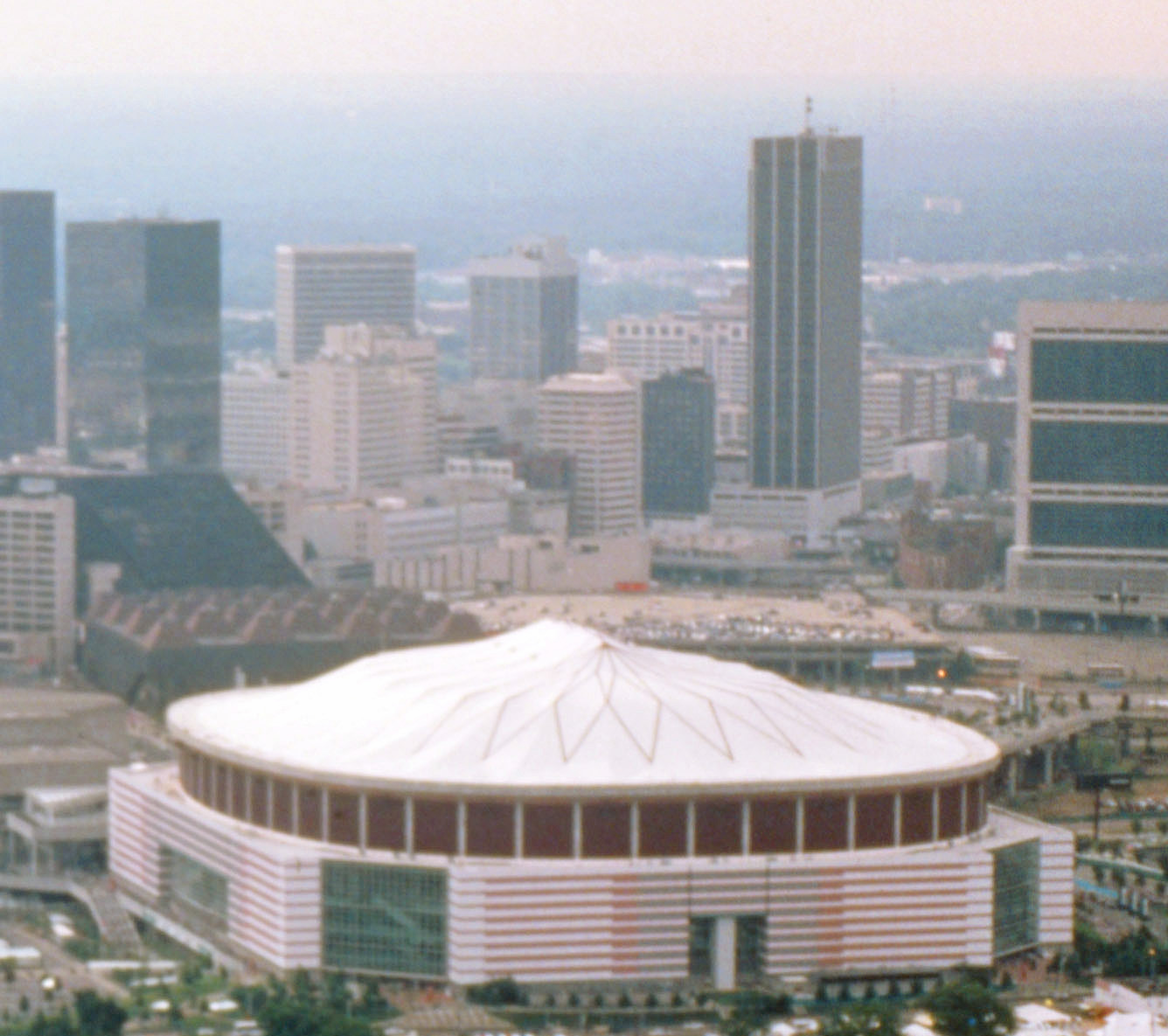
- Level: Senior
- Type: Indoor
- Events: 28 (14 men's + 14 women's)

The 1995 USA Indoor Track and Field Championships were held at the Georgia Dome in Atlanta, Georgia. Organized by USA Track and Field (USATF), the two-day competition took place March 3–4 and served as the national championships in indoor track and field for the United States. The championships in combined track and field events were held at a different date.

The competition was a qualifier for the U.S. team at the 1995 World Indoor Championships in Athletics. At the meeting, Michael Johnson broke his own world record in the men's 400 m. The record "surprised hardly anyone", according to reporting at the time.

At the women's championships, the pole vault was contested for the first time.

== Medal summary ==
=== Men ===
Event	Gold		Silver		Bronze	
60 m	Tim Harden	6.54				
200 m	Tod Long	20.75				
400 m	Michael Johnson	44.63				
800 m	Joseph Tengelei (KEN)	1:46.70	Jose Parrilla	1:47.24		
Mile run	Niall Bruton (IRL)	4:00.49	Marcus O'Sullivan (IRL)	4:00.76	Erik Nedeau	4:01.10
3000 m	Bob Kennedy	7:48.39				
60 m hurdles	Allen Johnson	7.42				
High jump	Tony Barton	2.29 m				
Pole vault	Nick Hysong	5.85 m				
Long jump	Joe Greene	8.17 m				
Triple jump	Kenny Harrison	16.99 m				
Shot put	C.J. Hunter	21.05 m				
Weight throw	Lance Deal	25.86 m				
5000 m walk	Allen James	20:16.47				
Heptathlon	Sheldon Blockburger	6035 pts				

=== Women ===
Event	Gold		Silver		Bronze
60 m	Gwen Torrence	7.04			
200 m	Carlette Guidry	22.73			
400 m	Jearl Miles	50.99			
800 m	Maria Mutola (MOZ)	1:58.41	Meredith Rainey	1:59.61	
Mile run	Regina Jacobs	4:26.54			
3000 m	Lynn Jennings	8:57.62			
60 m hurdles	Lynda Goode	7.97			
High jump	Gwen Wentland	1.96 m			
Pole vault	Melissa Price	3.55 m			
Long jump	Jackie Joyner-Kersee	6.72 m			
Triple jump	Sheila Hudson	14.23 m			
Shot put	Ramona Pagel	18.68 m			
Weight throw	Sonja Fitts	18.96 m			
3000 m walk	Michelle Rohl	13:04.99			
Pentathlon	Kym Carter	4696 pts			
