= 2006 USA Indoor Track and Field Championships =

- Dates: February 24–26
- Host city: Boston, Massachusetts, United States
- Venue: Reggie Lewis Track and Athletic Center
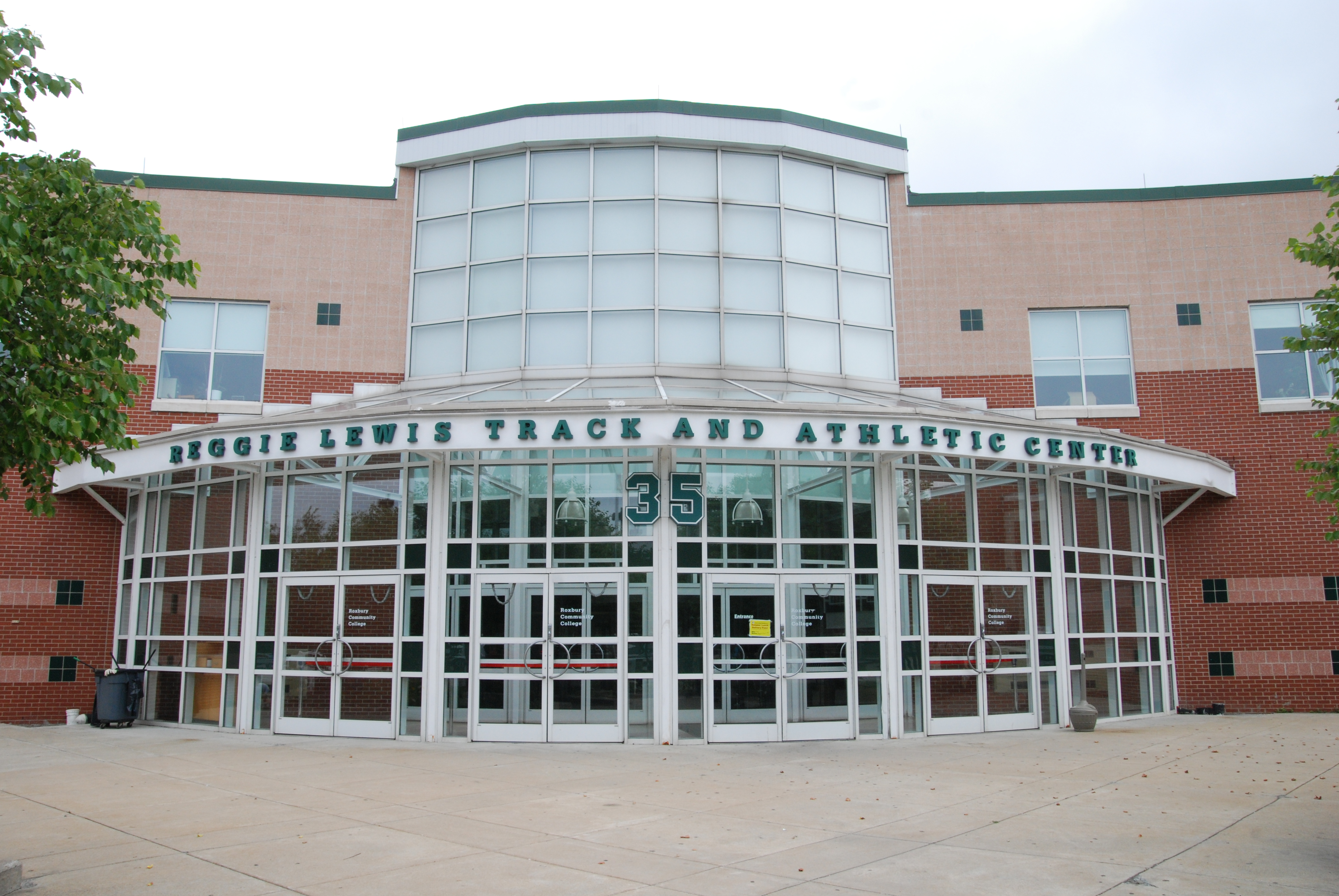
- Level: Senior
- Type: Indoor
- Events: 31 (16 men's + 15 women's)

The 2006 USA Indoor Track and Field Championships were held at the Reggie Lewis Track and Athletic Center in Boston, Massachusetts. Organized by USA Track and Field (USATF), the two-day competition took place February 24–26 and served as the national championships in indoor track and field for the United States. The championships in combined track and field events were held at a different time.

The meeting served as a qualifier for the U.S. team at the 2006 IAAF World Indoor Championships. At the meeting, Terrence Trammell and Me'Lisa Barber set world leads in the men's 60 m hurdles and women's 60 m respectively.

== Medal summary ==
=== Men ===
Event	Gold		Silver	Bronze
60 m	Leonard Scott	6.52		
400 m	Milton Campbell	46.17		
800 m	Khadevis Robinson	1:46.98		
1500 m	Chris Lukezic	3:41.84		
3000 m	Adam Goucher	7:49.78		
60 m hurdles	Terrence Trammell	7.46		
High jump	Adam Shunk	2.25 m		
Pole vault	Brad Walker	5.75 m		
Long jump	Brian Johnson	7.95 m		
Triple jump	Walter Davis	16.87 m		
Shot put	Reese Hoffa	21.61 m		
Weight throw	A.G. Kruger	23.74 m		
Heptathlon	Ryan Harlan	5949 pts		
1 mile walk	Tim Seaman	5:47.59		
3000 m walk	Tim Seaman	11:26.62		
5000 m walk	Tim Seaman	19:15.88		

=== Women ===
Event	Gold		Silver	Bronze
60 m	Me'Lisa Barber	7.06		
400 m	Sandy Richards	51.28		
800 m	Alice Schmidt	2:01.93		
1500 m	Treniere Clement	4:08.13		
3000 m	Carrie Tollefson	9:05.80		
60 m hurdles	Danielle Carruthers	7.93		
High jump	Chaunte Howard	1.95 m		
Pole vault	Kellie Suttle	4.55 m		
Long jump	Akiba McKinney	6.62 m		
Triple jump	Tiombe Hurd	13.89 m		
Shot put	Jillian Camarena	19.26 m		
Weight throw	Erin Gilreath	22.95 m		
Pentathlon	Lela Nelson	4123 pts		
1 mile walk	Jolene Moore	6:50.81		
3000 m walk	Joanne Dow	12:45.05		
