= 1994 USA Indoor Track and Field Championships =

National athletics championship event

- Dates: March 4–5
- Host city: Atlanta, Georgia, United States
- Venue: Georgia Dome
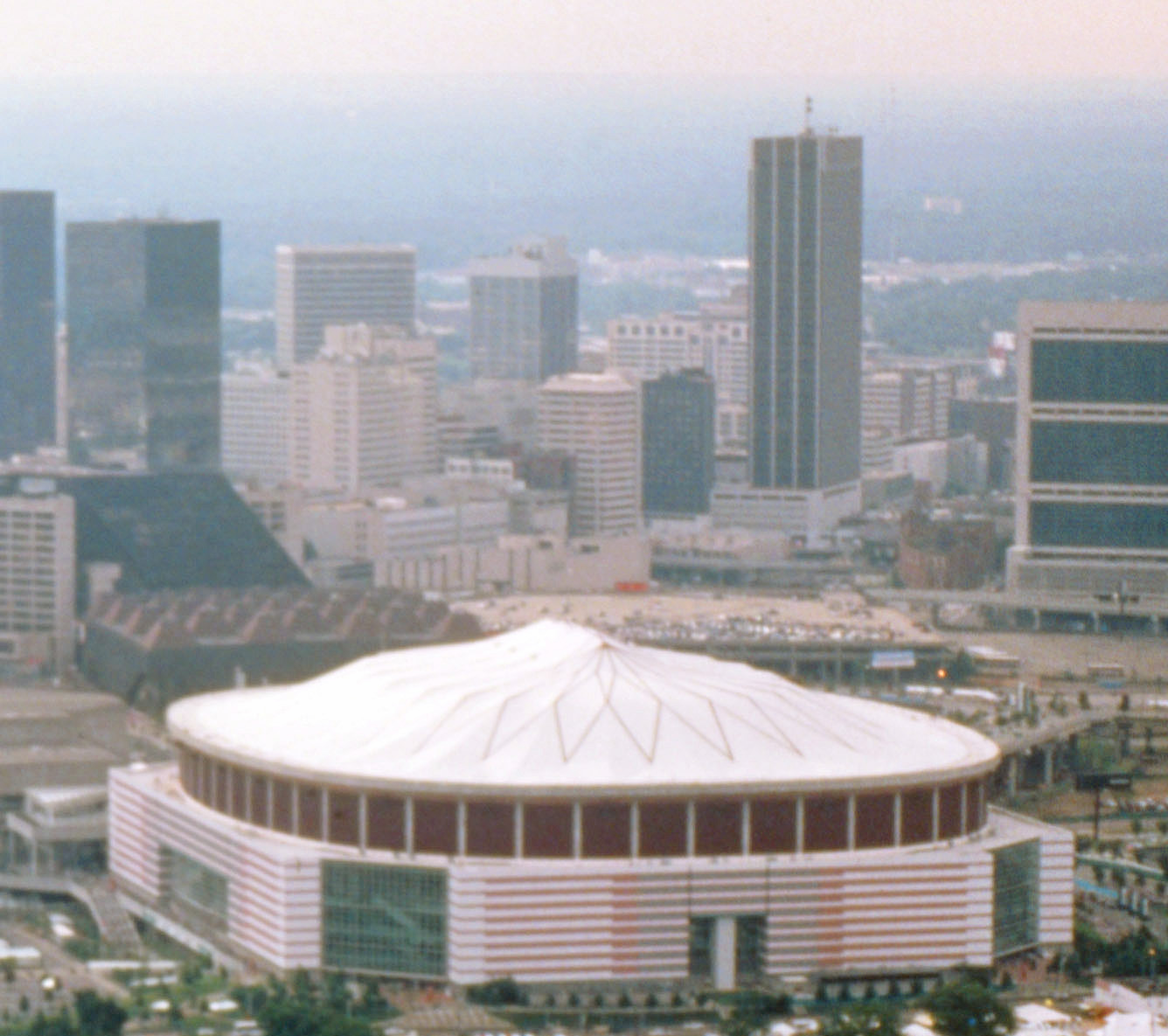
- Level: Senior
- Type: Indoor
- Events: 27 (14 men's + 13 women's)

The 1994 USA Indoor Track and Field Championships were held at the Georgia Dome in Atlanta, Georgia. Organized by USA Track and Field (USATF), the two-day competition took place March 4–5 and served as the national championships in indoor track and field for the United States.

At the meeting, Gwen Torrence swept the 60 m and 200 m while Jackie Joyner-Kersee stumbled and fell during the 60 m hurdles. 19,080 spectators attended the event.

== Medal summary ==
=== Men ===
Event	Gold		Silver		Bronze	
60 m	Dennis Mitchell	6.57				
200 m	Chris Nelloms	20.57				
400 m	Darnell Hall	46.12				
800 m	David Kiptoo (KEN)	1:47.05	Sunder Nix	1:48.37		
Mile run	William Tanui (KEN)	4:00.85	Marcus O'Sullivan (IRL)	4:00.96	Marcus Dunbar	4:02.76
3000 m	Moses Kiptanui (KEN)	7:42.81	Matt Giusto	7:53.34		
60 m hurdles	Tony Dees	7.54				
High jump	Hollis Conway	2.25 m				
Pole vault	Kory Tarpenning	5.70 m				
Long jump	Kareem Streete-Thompson	8.19 m				
Triple jump	Tyrone Scott	16.68 m				
Shot put	Kevin Toth	21.25 m				
Weight throw	Lance Deal	22.70 m				
5000 m walk	Jonathan Matthews	20:01.50				

=== Women ===
Event	Gold		Silver		Bronze
60 m	Gwen Torrence	7.10			
200 m	Gwen Torrence	22.74			
400 m	Maicel Malone	51.72			
800 m	Maria Mutola (MOZ)	2:00.52	Joetta Clark	2:01.80	
Mile run	Hassiba Boulmerka (ALG)	4:31.91	Gina Procaccio	4:35.38	
3000 m	Kathy Franey	9:14.64			
60 m hurdles	Michelle Freeman (JAM)	7.98	Lavonna Floreal	8.08	
High jump	Angie Bradburn	1.98 m			
Long jump	Jackie Joyner-Kersee	7.13 m			
Triple jump	Sheila Hudson	13.80 m			
Shot put	Ramona Pagel	18.50 m			
Weight throw	Sonja Fitts	17.47 m			
3000 m walk	Debbi Lawrence	13:13.20			
