= Patrick Johnson =

Patrick Johnson may refer to:

== Sportspeople ==
- Patrick Johnson (wide receiver) (born 1976), former American football player
- Patrick Johnson (defensive end) (born 1998), American football player
- Patrick Peterson (born 1990), American football player, formerly known as Patrick Johnson
- Patrick Johnson (sprinter) (born 1972), Australian sprinter

== Others ==
- Patrick Read Johnson (born 1962), American filmmaker, special effects artist and screenwriter
- Patrick Johnson (actor) (born 1993), American actor
- E. Patrick Johnson (born 1967), African-American performance artist, ethnographer, and scholar
- Togger Johnson (Patrick Johnson), a character in the children's TV series Grange Hill

== See also ==
- Pat Johnson (disambiguation)
- Patrick Johnston (disambiguation)
