= USA Indoor Track and Field Championships =

Annual indoor track and field competition

- Current season, competition or edition: 2026 USA Indoor Track and Field Championships
- Sport: track and field
- Founded: 1906 (demonstration held in 1888)
- Country: United States

The USA Indoor Track and Field Championships is an annual indoor track and field competition organized by USA Track & Field, which serves as the American national championships for the sport. In years which feature a World Indoor Championships in Athletics, the championships serve as a way of selecting the best athletes for those competitions.

== Editions ==
=== USATF era ===
Edition	Venue	Stadium	Date
2026	New York City, New York	Ocean Breeze Athletics Complex	February 28–March 1, 2026
2025	New York City, New York	Ocean Breeze Athletics Complex	February 22–23, 2025
2024	Albuquerque, New Mexico	Albuquerque Convention Center	February 16–17, 2024
2023	Albuquerque, New Mexico	Albuquerque Convention Center	February 16–18, 2023
2022	Spokane, Washington	The Podium (sports facility)	February 26–27, 2022
2020	Albuquerque, New Mexico	Albuquerque Convention Center	February 14–15, 2020
2019	New York City, New York	Ocean Breeze Athletic Complex	February 22–24, 2019
2018	Albuquerque, New Mexico	Albuquerque Convention Center	February 16–18, 2018
2017	Albuquerque, New Mexico	Albuquerque Convention Center	March 3–5, 2017
2016	Portland, Oregon	Oregon Convention Center	March 11–12, 2016
2015	Boston, Massachusetts	Reggie Lewis Track and Athletic Center	February 27 – March 1, 2015
2014	Albuquerque, New Mexico	Albuquerque Convention Center	February 21–23, 2014
2013	Albuquerque, New Mexico	Albuquerque Convention Center	March 2–3, 2013
2012	Albuquerque, New Mexico	Albuquerque Convention Center	February 25–26, 2012
2011	Albuquerque, New Mexico	Albuquerque Convention Center	February 26–27, 2011
2010	Albuquerque, New Mexico	Albuquerque Convention Center	February 27–28, 2010
2009	Boston, Massachusetts	Reggie Lewis Track and Athletic Center	February 28 – March 1, 2009
2008	Boston, Massachusetts	Reggie Lewis Track and Athletic Center	February 23–24, 2008
2007	Boston, Massachusetts	Reggie Lewis Track and Athletic Center	February 24–25, 2007
2006	Boston, Massachusetts	Reggie Lewis Track and Athletic Center	February 24–26, 2006
2005	Boston, Massachusetts	Reggie Lewis Track and Athletic Center	February 25–27, 2005
2004	Boston, Massachusetts	Reggie Lewis Track and Athletic Center	February 27–29, 2004
2003	Boston, Massachusetts	Reggie Lewis Track and Athletic Center	February 28 – March 2, 2003
2002	New York City, New York	Fort Washington Avenue Armory	March 1–2, 2002
2001	Atlanta, Georgia	Georgia Dome	March 2–3, 2001
2000	Atlanta, Georgia	Georgia Dome	March 3–4, 2000
1999	Atlanta, Georgia	Georgia Dome	February 26–27, 1999
1998	Atlanta, Georgia	Georgia Dome	February 27–28, 1998
1997	Atlanta, Georgia	Georgia Dome	February 28 – March 1, 1997
1996	Atlanta, Georgia	Georgia Dome	March 1–2, 1996
1995	Atlanta, Georgia	Georgia Dome	March 3–4, 1995
1994	Atlanta, Georgia	Georgia Dome	March 4–5, 1994
1993	New York City, New York	Madison Square Garden	February 26, 1993

=== TAC era ===
Edition	Venue	Stadium	Date
1992	New York City, New York	Madison Square Garden	February 28, 1992
1991	New York City, New York	Madison Square Garden	February 22, 1991
1990	New York City, New York	Madison Square Garden	February 23, 1992
1989	New York City, New York	Madison Square Garden	February 24, 1989
1988	New York City, New York	Madison Square Garden	February 26, 1988
1987	New York City, New York	Madison Square Garden	February 27, 1987
1986	New York City, New York	Madison Square Garden	February 28, 1986
1985	New York City, New York	Madison Square Garden	February 22, 1985
1984	New York City, New York	Madison Square Garden	February 25, 1984
1983	New York City, New York	Madison Square Garden	February 25, 1983
1982	New York City, New York	Madison Square Garden	February 26, 1982
1981	New York City, New York	Madison Square Garden	February 27, 1981
1980	New York City, New York	Madison Square Garden	February 29, 1980

=== AAU combined gender era ===
Edition	Venue	Stadium	Date
1979	New York City, New York	Madison Square Garden	February 23, 1979
1978	New York City, New York	Madison Square Garden	February 24, 1978
1977	New York City, New York	Madison Square Garden	February 25, 1977
1976	New York City, New York	Madison Square Garden	February 27, 1976
1975	New York City, New York	Madison Square Garden	February 28, 1975
1974	New York City, New York	Madison Square Garden	February 22, 1974
1973	New York City, New York	Madison Square Garden	February 23, 1973
1972	New York City, New York	Madison Square Garden	February 25, 1972
1971	New York City, New York	Madison Square Garden	February 26, 1971
1970	New York City, New York	Madison Square Garden	February 27, 1970
1969	Philadelphia, Pennsylvania	Spectrum	March 1, 1969
1968	Oakland, California	Oakland-Alameda County Coliseum Arena	February 23–24, 1968
1967	Oakland, California	Oakland-Alameda County Coliseum Arena	March 3–4, 1967
1966	Albuquerque, New Mexico	Tingley Coliseum	March 4–5, 1966
1965	New York City, New York	Madison Square Garden	February 19–20, 1965

=== AAU split gender era ===
Edition	Men's Venue	Men's Stadium	Men's Date	Women's Venue	Women's Stadium	Women's Date
1964	New York City, New York	Madison Square Garden	February 22, 1964	Akron, Ohio	University of Akron Athletics Field House	April 11–12, 1964
1963	New York City, New York	Madison Square Garden	February 23, 1963	Columbus, Ohio	Ohio State University French Field House	March 22–23, 1963
1962	New York City, New York	Madison Square Garden	February 24, 1962	Louisville, Kentucky	Freedom Hall	February 17, 1962
1961	New York City, New York	Madison Square Garden	February 25, 1961	Columbus, Ohio	Ohio State University French Field House	March 11, 1961
1960	New York City, New York	Madison Square Garden	February 20, 1960	Chicago, Illinois		April 16, 1960
1959	New York City, New York	Madison Square Garden	February 21, 1959	Washington, DC	D.C. Armory	January 24, 1959
1958	New York City, New York	Madison Square Garden	February 22, 1958	Akron, Ohio	University of Akron Athletics Field House	March 22, 1958
1957	New York City, New York	Madison Square Garden	1957	Cleveland, Ohio		1957
1956	New York City, New York	Madison Square Garden	1956	Washington, D.C.		1956
1955	New York City, New York	Madison Square Garden	1955	Chicago, Illinois		1955
1954	New York City, New York	Madison Square Garden	1954	New York City, New York		1954
1953	New York City, New York	Madison Square Garden	1953	Buffalo, New York		1953
1952	New York City, New York	Madison Square Garden	1952	Buffalo, New York		1952
1951	New York City, New York	Madison Square Garden	1951	New York City, New York		1951
1950	New York City, New York	Madison Square Garden	1950	New York City, New York		1950
1949	New York City, New York	Madison Square Garden	1949	New York City, New York		1949
1948	New York City, New York	Madison Square Garden	1948	Chicago, Illinois		1948
1947	New York City, New York	Madison Square Garden	1947	not held		
1946	New York City, New York	Madison Square Garden	1946	Cleveland, Ohio		1946
1945	New York City, New York	Madison Square Garden	1945	Buffalo, New York		1945
1944	New York City, New York	Madison Square Garden	1944	not held		
1943	New York City, New York	Madison Square Garden	1943	not held		
1942	New York City, New York	Madison Square Garden	1942	not held		
1941	New York City, New York	Madison Square Garden	1941	Atlantic City, New Jersey		1941
1940	New York City, New York	Madison Square Garden	1940	not held		
1939	New York City, New York	Madison Square Garden	1939	not held		
1938	New York City, New York	Madison Square Garden	1938	not held		
1937	New York City, New York	Madison Square Garden	1937	St. Louis, Missouri		1937
1936	New York City, New York	Madison Square Garden	1936	St. Louis, Missouri		1936
1935	New York City, New York	Madison Square Garden	1935	St. Louis, Missouri		1935
1934	New York City, New York	Madison Square Garden	1934	Brooklyn, New York		1934
1933	New York City, New York	Madison Square Garden	1933	New York City, New York		1933
1932	New York City, New York	Madison Square Garden	1932	Newark, New Jersey		1932
1931	New York City, New York	Madison Square Garden	1931	Newark, New Jersey		1931
1930	New York City, New York	Madison Square Garden	1930	Boston, Massachusetts		1930
1929	New York City, New York	Madison Square Garden	1929	Boston, Massachusetts		1929
1928	New York City, New York	Madison Square Garden	1928	Boston, Massachusetts		1928
1927	New York City, New York	Madison Square Garden	1927	Boston, Massachusetts		1927
1926	Chicago, Illinois		1926	not held		
1925	Louisville, Kentucky		1925	not held		
1924	New York City, New York		1924	not held		
1923	Buffalo, New York		1923	not held		
1922	Buffalo, New York		1922	not held		
1921	New York City, New York		1921	not held		
1920	New York City, New York		1920	not held		
1919	Brooklyn, New York		1919	not held		
1918	New York City, New York		1918	not held		
1917	New York City, New York		1917	not held		
1916	New York City, New York		1916	not held		
1915	New York City, New York		1915	not held		
1914	New York City, New York		1914	not held		
1913	New York City, New York		1913	not held		
1912	not held			not held		
1911	New York City, New York		1911	not held		
1910	New York City, New York		1910	not held		
1909	New York City, New York		1909	not held		
1908	New York City, New York		1908	not held		
1907	New York City, New York		1907	not held		
1906	New York City, New York		1906	not held		

== Events ==
The following athletics events feature on the national championships' program:

- Sprint: 60 m, 200 m, 300 m, 400 m
- Middle-distance track events: 600 m, 800 m, 1000 m, 1500m, Mile
- Long distance track events: 3000 m
- Hurdles: 60 m hurdles
- Jumps: long jump, triple jump, high jump, pole vault
- Throws: shot put, weight throw
- Combined events: heptathlon, pentathlon
- Walks: 3000 m walk, 2 mile walk, 5000 m walk

== Championships records ==
=== Men ===
Event	Record	Athlete	Nationality	Date	Meet	Location	Ref.
60 m	6.34 A	Christian Coleman	United States	18 February 2018	2018 Championships	Albuquerque	
200 m	20.31	Coby Miller	United States	3 March 2001		Atlanta	
300 m	31.87 A	Noah Lyles	United States	4 March 2017	2017 Championships	Albuquerque	
400 m	44.63	Michael Johnson	United States	4 March 1995		Atlanta	
600 m	1:15.07 A	Erik Sowinski	United States	5 March 2017	2017 Championships	Albuquerque	
800 m	1:43.24	Josh Hoey	United States	23 February 2025	2025 Championships	Staten Island	
1000 m	2:18.60 A	Clayton Murphy	United States	5 March 2017	2017 Championships	Albuquerque	
1500 m	3:37.51 A	Cole Hocker	United States	17 February 2024	2024 Championships	Albuquerque	
Mile	3:52.99	Noureddine Morceli	Algeria	22 February 1991		New York City	
3000 m	7:42.81	Moses Kiptanui	Kenya	5 March 1994		Atlanta	
Two miles	8:25.29	Drew Hunter	United States	23 February 2015	2019 Championships	Staten Island	
60 m hurdles	7.27 A	Grant Holloway	United States	16 February 2024	2024 Championships	Albuquerque	
High jump	2.38 m	Matt Hemingway	United States	4 March 2000		Atlanta	
Pole vault	6.01 m	Zachery Bradford	United States	28 February 2026	2026 Championships	Staten Island	
Long jump	8.59 m	Miguel Pate	United States	2 March 2002		New York City	
Triple jump	17.76 m	Mike Conley	United States	27 February 1987		New York City	
Shot put	22.80 m A	Ryan Crouser	United States	17 February 2024	2024 Championships	Albuquerque	
Weight throw	26.35 m A	Daniel Haugh	United States	16 February 2024	2024 Championships	Albuquerque	
Heptathlon	6382 pts	Garrett Scantling	United States	26–27 February 2022	2022 Championships	Spokane	
Heptathlon	60m / Long jump / Shot put / High jump / 60m H / Pole vault / 1000m; 6.86 / 7.34 m / 16.16 m / 2.05 m / 7.81 / 5.20 m / 2:43.04						
3000 m walk	11:36.27 A	Trevor Barron	United States	25 February 2012	2012 Championships	Albuquerque	
5000 m walk	18:53.25	Guillaume LeBlanc	Canada	26 February 1988		New York City	

=== Women ===
Event	Athlete	Record	Nationality	Date	Meet	Location	Ref.	Video
60 m	6.94 A	Aleia Hobbs	United States	18 February 2023	2023 Championships	Albuquerque		
200 m	22.33	Gwen Torrence	United States	2 March 1996		Atlanta		
300 m	35.95	Brittany Brown	United States	23 February 2015	2019 Championships	Staten Island		
400 m	50.34 A	Alexis Holmes	United States	17 February 2024	2024 Championships	Albuquerque		
600 m	1:23.57	Athing Mu	United States	24 February 2019	2019 Championships	Staten Island		
800 m	1:58.41	Maria Mutola	Mozambique	4 March 1995		Atlanta		
1000 m	2:34.71	Ajeé Wilson	United States	24 February 2019	2019 Championships	Staten Island		
1500 m	4:03.08	Mary Slaney	United States	4 March 1997				
Mile	4:25.92	Regina Jacobs	United States	4 March 2000		Atlanta		
3000 m	8:30.01	Emily Mackay	United States	28 February 2026	2026 Championships	Staten Island		
Two miles	9:28.15	Lynn Jennings	United States	1986				
60 m hurdles	7.67 A	Tia Jones	United States	16 February 2024	2024 Championships	Albuquerque		
High jump	2.02 m A	Chaunté Lowe	United States	26 February 2012	2012 Championships	Albuquerque		
Pole vault	5.02 m A	Jenn Suhr	United States	2 March 2013	2013 Championships	Albuquerque		
Long jump	7.32 m	Heike Drechsler	East Germany	27 February 1987		New York City		
Triple jump	14.64 m	Tori Franklin	United States	14 February 2020	2020 Championships	Albuquerque		
Shot put	20.44 m	Chase Jackson	United States	28 February 2026	2026 Championships	Staten Island		
Weight throw	26.02 m A	DeAnna Price	United States	17 February 2023	2023 Championships	Albuquerque		
Pentathlon	5004 pts A	Anna Hall	United States	16 February 2023	2023 Championships	Albuquerque		
Pentathlon	60m H / High jump / Shot put / Long jump / 800m; 8.04 / 1.91 m / 13.80 m / 6.34 m / 2:05.70							
3000 m walk	12:28.32	Michelle Rohl	United States	3 March 2001		Atlanta		
2 Miles walk	13:55.27	Maria Michta-Coffey	United States	5 March 2017	2017 Championships	Albuquerque		

== See also ==
- List of USA Indoor Track and Field Championships winners (men)
- List of USA Indoor Track and Field Championships winners (women)
- USA Outdoor Track and Field Championships
- USA Marathon Championships
- USA Half Marathon Championships
- USA Cross Country Championships
