= 1993 USA Indoor Track and Field Championships =

National athletics championship event

- Dates: February 26
- Host city: New York City, New York, United States
- Venue: Madison Square Garden
- Level: Senior
- Type: Indoor
- Events: 27 (14 men's + 13 women's)

The 1993 USA Indoor Track and Field Championships were held at the Madison Square Garden in New York City, New York. Organized by USA Track and Field (USATF), the two-day competition took place February 26 and served as the national championships in indoor track and field for the United States.

It was the first edition hosted by USATF, having been run by The Athletics Congress previously. It acted as a qualifier for the U.S. team at the 1993 World Indoor Championships in Athletics. At the meeting, Gail Devers broke her own two-week-old American record in the 60 metres.

== Medal summary ==
=== Men ===
Event	Gold		Silver		Bronze	
60 m	Jon Drummond	6.60				
400 m	Antonio McKay	48.56				
500 m	Mark Everett	1:01.19				
800 m	Stanley Redwine	1:48.77				
Mile run	Noureddine Morceli (ALG)	3:54.59	Marcus O'Sullivan (IRL)	3:54.90	Steve Holman	3:55.41
3000 m	Joe Falcon	7:49.20				
60 m hurdles	Tony Dees	7.52				
High jump	Hollis Conway	2.37 m				
Pole vault	Greg West	5.71 m				
Long jump	Obinna Eregbu (NGR)	7.87 m	Huei-Fang Nai (TPE)	7.70 m	Joe Greene	7.48 m
Triple jump	Tyrone Scott	16.71 m				
Shot put	Jim Doehring	21.56 m				
Weight throw	Lance Deal	24.84 m				
5000 m walk	Allen James	20:24.37				

=== Women ===
Event	Gold		Silver		Bronze
60 m	Gail Devers	6.99			
200 m	Rochelle Stevens	23.51			
400 m	Jillian Richardson (CAN)	53.24	Jearl Miles	53.26	
800 m	Maria Mutola (MOZ)	1:59.63	Joetta Clark	2:01.60	
Mile run	Shelly Steely	4:30.23			
3000 m	Lynn Jennings	9:00.52			
60 m hurdles	Michelle Freeman (JAM)	7.90	LaVonna Martin Floreal	7.93	
High jump	Yolanda Henry	1.92 m			
Long jump	Christy Opara (NGR)	6.29 m	Sharon Couch	6.26 m	
Triple jump	Sheila Hudson	13.49 m			
Shot put	Connie Price-Smith	18.22 m			
Weight throw	Sonja Fitts	18.62 m			
3000 m walk	Debbi Lawrence	12:35.79			
