= Patricia Altenbernd Johnson =

American philosopher

Patricia Altenbernd Johnson (born 1945) is Distinguished Service Professor Emerita of Philosophy at the University of Dayton. She has written books about contemporary philosophers. She is a specialist in philosophy of religion, hermeneutics and 19th and 20th century continental philosophy, and on the works of Martin Heidegger and Hans-Georg Gadamer.

Johnson earned her Ph.D. from the University of Toronto in 1979, and joined the University of Dayton in the same year. She was named to the Alumni Chair in the Humanities in 2009, becoming the first woman in the University of Dayton College of Arts and Sciences to hold an endowed professorship. She also directed the women's studies program and chaired the philosophy department at the university, and served as an associate dean. She retired in 2014.

She was president of the Society for Philosophy of Religion in 2000.

== Works ==
- On Gadamer, Wadsworth Philosophers Series, Wadsworth Publishing, 1999.
- On Arendt, Wadsworth Philosophers Series, Wadsworth Publishing, 2000.
- On Heidegger, Wadsworth Philosophers Series, Wadsworth Publishing, 1999.
- On Wollstonecraft, Wadsworth Philosophers Series, Wadsworth Publishing, 1999.
- With Both Eyes Open: Seeing Beyond Gender, edited with Janet Kalven, Pilgrim Press, 1988.
