= George Young (runner) =

American athlete (1937–2022)

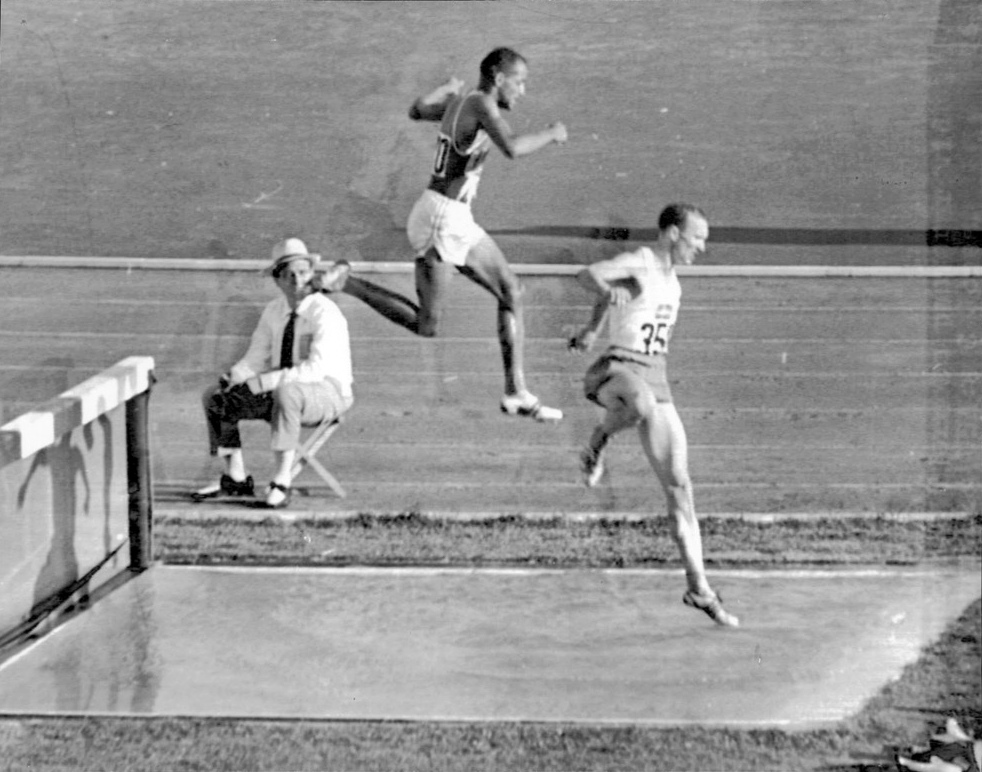
- Young right behind Gunnar Tjörnebo over the last hurdle in the 1960 Summer Olympics

Personal information
- Full name: George L. Young
- Nationality: American
- Born: July 24, 1937 Roswell, New Mexico, U.S.
- Died: November 8, 2022 (aged 85) Casa Grande, Arizona, U.S.
- Height: 5 ft 8.5 in (1.740 m)
- Weight: 148 lb (67 kg)

Sport
- Sport: Long-distance running
- Event: Steeplechase
- College team: Arizona

Achievements and titles
- Personal best(s): Mile: 3:59.6; 2 miles: 8:22; 3k steeple: 8:30.60; 3 miles: 13:10; 5000m: 13:29.40; 6 miles: 27:54.8; Marathon: 2:30:48
Medal record
Men's athletics
Representing the United States
Olympic Games
Bronze medal – third place	1968 Mexico City	3000m Steeplechase

George L. Young (July 24, 1937 – November 8, 2022) was an American track athlete and college coach. He won a bronze medal at the 1968 Summer Olympics in the 3000 meter steeplechase and held several American records in events ranging from the two mile to the 5000 meter race. He broke two world records, in the indoor two and three mile events.

== Early life and education ==
Born in Roswell, New Mexico, Young graduated from Western High School (now Silver High School), in Silver City, New Mexico, in 1955. He then attended the University of Arizona where he competed in track and field and joined the Beta Iota chapter of Theta Chi fraternity. He began running the 3000 meter steeplechase in his senior year and finished second in that event at the National AAU championship. He graduated from the university in 1959 with an undergraduate degree after being named the "outstanding senior athlete" of the year.

== 1960 Olympics ==
Shortly after graduating, Young qualified for the 1960 Summer Olympics in Rome. During the preliminary rounds for the steeplechase, he tripped over a hurdle and thus did not advance to the finals. The next year, he broke the American steeplechase record when he ran the event in 8:31.0.

== 1964 Olympics ==
Young improved his Olympic record at the 1964 games in Tokyo, running to fifth place in the steeplechase in 8:38.2. Gaston Roelants of Belgium won gold in an Olympic Record 8:30.8.

== 1968 Olympics ==
In the first half of 1968, Young broke his own American steeplechase record with a time of 8:30.6 and set the American two mile record with a time of 8:22.0. He felt his fitness was strong enough that he and training partner Billy Mills thought they'd take a shot at an Olympic marathon qualifier at the trials held in Alamosa, Colorado. Young won the race and earned his way on to his third Olympic team. He later qualified again in the steeplechase at the track and field trials held in Echo Summit, California. At the 1968 Olympics, held in Mexico City at an elevation of 7,382 ft, he competed in the marathon, placing 16th, and the steeplechase, where he placed third and took the bronze medal. In that race, he was leading with about 300 Meters to go before falling victim to Mexico City's altitude and "hitting the wall". He was passed by two athletes born and trained at altitude in Kenya.

The following year Young set two world records in the indoor two and three mile events with times of 8:27.2 and 13:09.8, respectively. He was featured on the March 1969 cover of Track and Field News.

== 1972 Olympics ==
After a classic battle with University of Oregon All-American, Steve Prefontaine at the 1972 U.S. Olympic Trials at Hayward Field in Eugene, Oregon, he competed in the 5000 meter race at the 1972 Summer Olympics in Munich (his third different Olympic event in four Olympic Games), but did not advance to the final rounds.

== Career summary and records ==
In addition to his records in the steeplechase, two mile and indoor three mile, he also held American records for the 5000 meter, 3000 meter, steeplechase, and 4x1500 meter relay, as well as twelve age group world records. At age 34, he became the oldest person in the world (at that time) to run a sub-four-minute mile, with a time of 3:59.6 in Los Angeles, CA in March 1972. He was the first New Mexico born athlete to accomplish this feat.

== Post-running career ==
Following his running career, he coached seven different sports at Central Arizona College. He led his teams to a total of fourteen championships, including the 1988 national title in cross country. In 1988 he was named the National Junior College Athletic Association coach of the year.

Young died on November 8, 2022, at the age of 85.

== Legacy and honors ==
Young was inducted into the National Track & Field Hall of Fame in 1981 and the National Distance Running Hall of Fame in 2003. He also has been inducted into the University of Arizona HOF, New Mexico Sports Hall of Fame in 2014, NJCAA Track and Cross Country HOF, National Distance Running HOF in 2003, and was inducted in the 2025 Arizona Sports HOF posthumously.

== Books ==
- 1976, Always Young, Frank Dolson.
