= Norman Tate =

American long jumper

Norman ("Norm") W. Tate (born January 2, 1942, in Oswald, West Virginia) is a retired long jumper from the United States, who set a personal best of wind-assisted 8.23 meters at a meet in El Paso on May 22, 1971. He represented his native country at the 1968 Summer Olympics in Mexico City, Mexico, where he was eliminated in the qualifying round of the men's triple jump.

He trained Jack Pierce, who was an Olympic medalist in the hurdles at the 1992 Summer Olympics.

Representing the North Carolina Central Eagles track and field team, Tate won the 1963 NCAA University Division Outdoor Track and Field Championships in the long jump.
