= Eleanor Montgomery =

American high jumper (1946–2013)

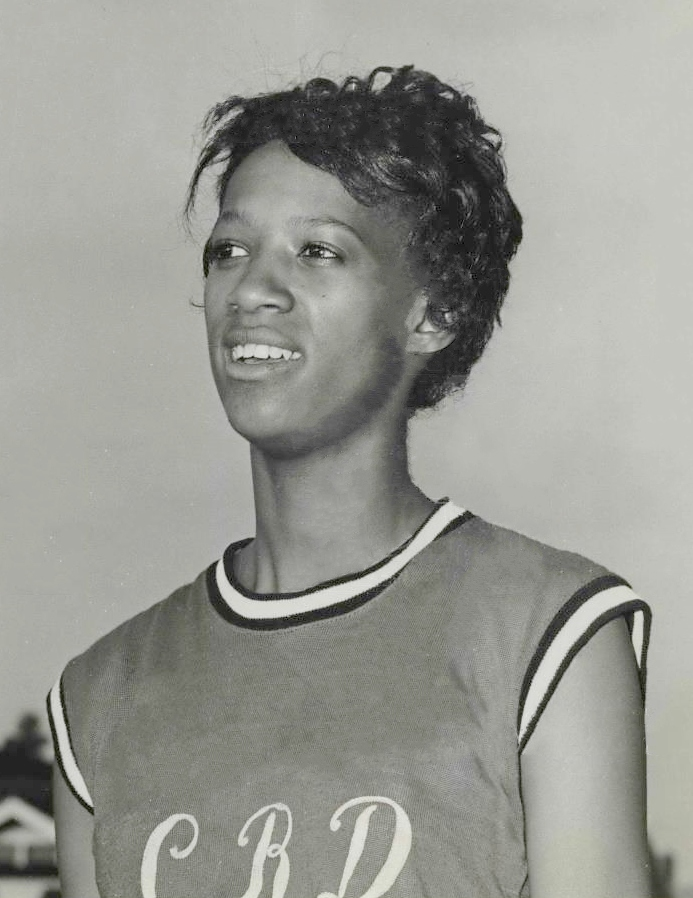
- Montgomery in 1967

Personal information
- Born: November 13, 1946 Cleveland, Ohio, U.S.
- Died: December 28, 2013 (aged 67) Cleveland, Ohio, U.S.
- Education: Tennessee State University
- Height: 174 cm (5 ft 9 in)
- Weight: 61 kg (134 lb)

Sport
- Sport: Athletics
- Event(s): High jump, long jump
- Club: TSU Tigers, Nashville
- Coached by: Ed Temple

Achievements and titles
- Personal best(s): HJ – 1.80 m (1969); LJ – 5.52 m (1962)

Eleanor Inez Montgomery (November 13, 1946 – December 28, 2013) was an American high jumper. She was a two-time Olympian, placing 8th in 1964 and 19th in 1968, and a Tigerbelle, the name of the Tennessee State University women's track and field program. Montgomery set her personal best in the high jump (1.80 m) on July 6, 1969 at the US National Championships in Dayton, which was an American record at that time. She also competed in the long jump and the pentathlon during her career.

After retiring from competitions Montgomery worked for the Cleveland Municipal School District and participated in the Interchurch Youth Activities Program as an organizer and official at athletics competitions. Montgomery was also the Executive Director of the National Football League Players' Association Youth Camp and assisted with the Special Olympics. In 1976 she was inducted into the Greater Cleveland Sports Hall of Fame, and in 2013 into the National Track and Field Hall of Fame.

== Achievements ==
Year	Tournament	Venue	Result	Height
1962	US National Championships	Los Angeles, California	6th	1.52 m
1963	US National Championships	Dayton, Ohio	1st	1.73 m
1963	Pan American Games	São Paulo, Brazil	1st	1.68 m
1964	US National Championships	Hanford, California	1st	1.73 m
1964	Olympic Games	Tokyo, Japan	8th	1.71 m
1965	US National Championships	Columbus, Ohio	1st	1.70 m
1966	US National Championships	Frederick, Maryland	1st	1.70 m
1967	US National Championships	Santa Barbara, California	1st	1.68 m
1967	Pan American Games	Winnipeg, Canada	1st	1.78 m
1968	Olympic Games	Mexico City, Mexico	19th	1.68 m
1969	US National Championships	Dayton, Ohio	1st	1.80 m
