= Todd Scully =

American racewalker (1948–2021)

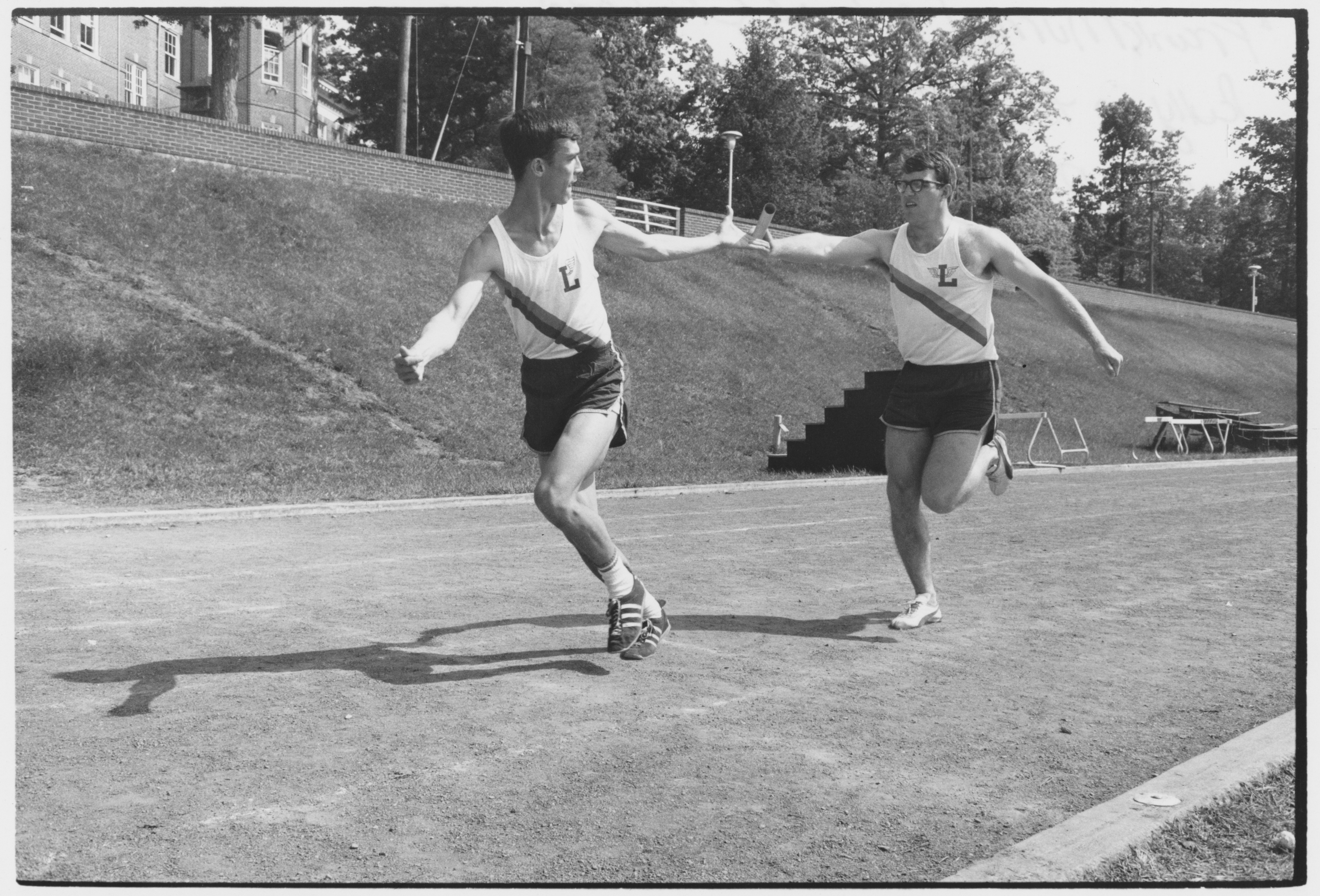
- Todd Scully receives the relay baton from Frank Murray in a 1968 track meet at Lynchburg College in Virginia.

Personal information
- Full name: Clark Todd Scully
- Nationality: American
- Born: September 13, 1948 Princeton, New Jersey, United States
- Died: September 6, 2021 (aged 72)

Sport
- Sport: Athletics
- Event: Racewalking
- College team: Lynchburg College Hornets

Clark Todd Scully (September 13, 1948 – September 6, 2021) was an American racewalker. He competed in the men's 20 kilometres walk at the 1976 Summer Olympics.

He competed on the track and field team at Lynchburg College in the 1960s, and graduated with a chemistry degree in 1970. He later returned to Lynchburg College for a graduate degree in physical education and secondary education in 1975. He is a member of the University of Lynchburg Sports Hall of Fame.

He was selected for the Olympic team in 1980, but the U.S. boycotted the games. A 2014 alumni magazine of Virginia Tech, where he was a graduate student in 1980, described his disappointment: "You just spent four years making progress and improvement, and you end up not being able to use it. Between '76 and '80, I think I set seven world records. ... I was ready to compete."
