= Doug Padilla =

American long-distance runner

Personal information
- Nationality: American
- Born: October 4, 1956 (age 70) Oakland, California, U.S.

Sport
- Sport: Track
- Events: 1500 meters, mile, 3000 meters, 5000 meters
- College team: BYU

Achievements and titles
- Highest world ranking: No. 1 for men's 3000m (1983)
- Personal bests: 1500 meters: 3:37.95; Mile: 3:54.2; 3000 meters: 7:35.84; 5000 meters: 13:15.44
Medal record
Representing United States
Summer Universiade
Gold medal – first place	1981 Bucharest	5000m

Douglas Floyd Padilla (born October 4, 1956 in Oakland, California) is a former middle and long distance runner from the United States, who won the overall Grand Prix 1985 and the World Cup 5000m race in 1985. He finished fifth in the 5000m final at the 1983 World Championships in Athletics in Helsinki, and seventh in the 5000m final at the 1984 Summer Olympics. In the 1983 World Championships 5,000-metre final, Padilla was among the favourites, but he succumbed to the radically accelerating pace of top runners, such as Ireland's Eamonn Coghlan, East Germany's Werner Schildhauer and Finland's Martti Vainio, during the last lap. He lost to the winner, Coghlan, by 3.55 seconds, but managed to defeat another unlucky favourite, West Germany's Thomas Wessinghage, by 0.38 seconds. By contrast, the fast 1984 Olympic 5,000-metre final was tough for Padilla already after 3,000 metres, and he painstakingly defeated New Zealand's John Walker who finished eighth. He was ranked number 1 in the world in 1983 for the 3000-meter distance.

== Running career ==
=== Collegiate ===
As an athlete, Padilla is one of the most decorated athletes in BYU history. While competing for the Cougars from 1978–81, he earned eight All-America citations and a National Championship in the indoor 2 Mile, regarded as one of the great moments in BYU Sports history. He rewrote the BYU record book, setting new marks in the indoor mile and two mile and outdoor 1500 and 5000 meters. In 1991, he was inducted into the BYU Athletic Hall of Fame. While still a collegian, he was called on to race two athletes that were current world-record-holders: Henry Rono of Kenya and Washington State, and Suleiman Nyambui of Tanzania and UTEP. Padilla came away with a victory over each, the latter to win the indoor national championship.

=== Post-collegiate ===
After college, Padilla was a 12-time US national champion while setting seven American records. His indoor two mile and indoor 5000 meters records each stood for over 20 years. A two-time Olympian, he is a veteran of five world championships. His accolades include victories in the 5000 meters at the 1985 World Cup and the 1986 Goodwill Games. From 1983 to 1987 he won five consecutive national indoor championships, four national outdoor championships, and two U.S. Olympic trials. In 1985 he was the IAAF World overall Grand Prix Champion.

Padilla was a very fast sprinter. When he was in top shape, he was known for his ability to outkick many other world-class runners, including the 10,000-metre European, World and Olympic champion Alberto Cova of Italy.

Padilla lost his top form after 1986, and was eliminated in the 5,000-metre heats at the 1987 World Athletics Championships in Rome. He still qualified for the 1991 World Athletics Championships 5,000-metre final in Tokyo, but there he ran very badly, finishing 14th and last - and losing to the winner, Kenya's Yobes Ondieki, by over 1 minute 20 seconds.

== Administrative career ==
Padilla retired in August 2014 as BYU Track and Field Director of Operations. Over the years he played an important role in the success of the track program and in the lives and development of hundreds of student-athletes.

Padilla was actively involved in promoting track and field in the state of Utah. In addition to being meet director of all BYU track and field and cross country meets, he was director of the BYU high school Invitational and the Utah UHSAA State Track and Field Championships. Under his leadership the presentation and execution of BYU track meets has risen to the level of some of the very best in the country. BYU was selected to host the 2006 NCAA West Region Championships and three High Performance Olympic Qualifier meets.

Said Padilla:

“I have had 15 outstanding years on the best campus in the world. We have great coaches and an excellent athletic director who supports our efforts toward excellence. We have been able to do some fun and exciting things. I will greatly miss my association with this inspired institution.”

== Personal life ==
Padilla graduated from BYU with a B.Sc in 1983 in electrical engineering. He and his wife Lynette have four children and reside in Utah. He worked for BYU with their sports programs, he also volunteers with the Utah South Area athletic council in coordinating 5k and 10k races.

Padilla is a member of The Church of Jesus Christ of Latter-day Saints and serves in the bishopric of a young single adult ward. He was one of three return missionaries to participate in the 1988 Summer Olympics along with Henry Marsh and Ed Eyestone.

Sporting positions
Preceded by (United Kingdom) David Moorcroft	Men's 3,000m Best Year Performance; 1983	Succeeded by (Morocco) Saïd Aouita
