= Martha Watson =

American long jumper and sprinter

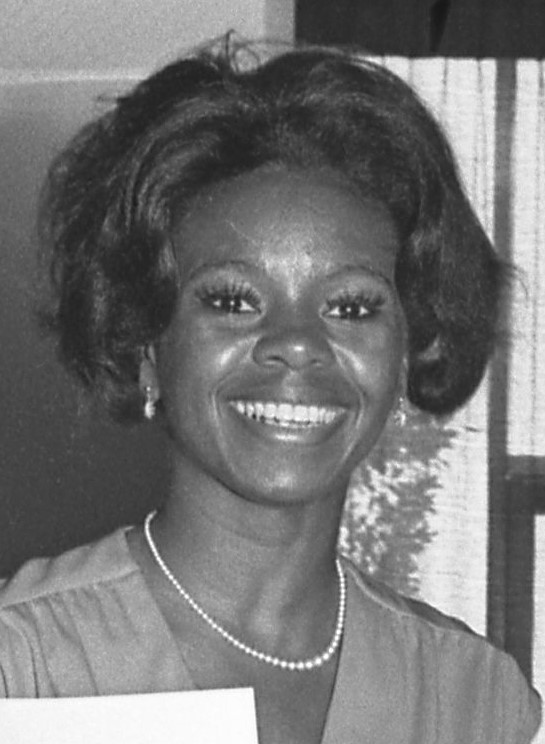
- Watson in 1976

Medal record

Women's athletics

Representing the United States

Pan American Games
Gold medal – first place	1975 Mexico City	4 x 100 metres relay
Silver medal – second place	1975 Mexico City	Long jump

Martha Rae Watson (born August 19, 1946) is a retired American track and field athlete. She qualified for four Olympics, 1964–1976 in the long jump, but also was a fast enough sprinter to be on two United States 4 x 100 metres relay teams. She picked up the individual silver medal in the long jump and the gold in the 4 x 100 relay at the 1975 Pan American Games. She was inducted into the National Track and Field Hall of Fame in 1987.

Watson was born in Long Beach, California. Barely after graduating from Long Beach Polytechnic High School, she qualified for her first Olympic team. She joined Olympic teammate Wyomia Tyus in going to women's track powerhouse Tennessee State University. She was the American Indoor Champion in the Long Jump 9 times; in 1965, 1967-9 and 1972–1976. She also won three USA Outdoor Track and Field Championships, 1973–5 before losing to the high school phenom Kathy McMillan, who also went on to Tennessee State University. Watson continued competing, jumping in the USA vs USSR meet of 1979, with the goal of making the 1980 Olympic team. When President Jimmy Carter announced the 1980 Summer Olympics boycott, that "killed the spark." By that point in time she had already found employment dealing Blackjack at Caesars Palace in Las Vegas.

Watson competed toward the end of the amateur era, when athletes were not officially allowed to make money from their athletic efforts.

"There was always a lot of talk about people slipping money into your shoes," she said, smiling. "Well, I left my shoes everywhere and they were always empty when I came back."

"It's a whole different world now. You're not only competing for wins, you're competing for contracts as well.

"All of that negotiating requires a lot of politics, and I always found it hard to compete and be political at the same time.

"I mean, I never made any money from it, but I do have lots of memories and friends all over the world. That's what I was about then."

— Martha Watson quoted in the Los Angeles Times, 1988
