= Maren Seidler =

American shot putter

Personal information
- Born: June 11, 1951 (age 75) Brooklyn, New York
Medal record
Women's Athletics
Representing the United States
Pan American Games
Silver medal – second place	1979 San Juan	Shot Put

Maren Elizabeth Seidler (born June 11, 1951) is a retired American track and field athlete. She dominated the shot put from the mid-1960s through 1980. She won the event at the USA Outdoor Track and Field Championships eleven times starting in 1967, including nine in a row from 1972 to 1980. She was the American champion indoors nine times, 1968–9, 1972, 1974-5 and 1977 to 1980. She won her event at the United States Olympic Trials four straight times 1968–1980, a feat only equalled by only one woman, Madeline Manning, Edwin Moses is the only man to achieve four. Jackie Joyner Kersee is the only woman who has won more events at the Olympic Trials, split between the long jump and heptathlon. She competed in the Olympics three times, making the final twice. Her 1980 selection was quashed by the 1980 Summer Olympics boycott. Seidler did however receive one of 461 Congressional Gold Medals created especially for the spurned athletes.

Seidler spent most of her career competing for the Mayor Daley Youth Foundation team. She started throwing for Tufts University, winning the 1971 DGWS Outdoor Track and Field Championships shot put title. Her back-to-back title in 1972 came while she was competing for California State University, Hayward, where she still holds the school record. She competed at the 1973 World University Games. Toward the end of her career, she joined a group of elite male throwers who congregated near San Jose, California called the San Jose Stars.

She also competed in three editions of the Pan American Games, winning a silver medal in 1979. She was elected into the National Track and Field Hall of Fame in 2000.
