= 60-yard dash =

Running benchmark used in parts of the United States

Athletics 60-yard dash

World records
- Men: (United States) Herb Washington 5.8 (1972)
- Women: (United States) Evelyn Ashford 6.54 (1982)

The 60-yard dash is a sprint covering 60 yards (54.86 m, sometimes recognized as '55-m dash'). It is primarily run to evaluate the speed and acceleration of American Major League Baseball players. It is also sometimes used to evaluate the speed of American football (especially NFL) players (although the 40-yard dash is much more common in football).

In the United States, prior to the adoption of metricized outdoor running tracks, the 60 yard dash was a commonly contested indoor event. Prior to 1983, the 60 yard dash was an event every year at the NCAA Indoor Track and Field Championships. The event was also regularly contested at the AAU Indoor Track and Field Championships.

== All-time top 25 ==
Rank	Time	Athlete	Country	Year	Ref.
1	5.8 h	Herb Washington	United States	1972	
1	5.8 h	Mel Pender	United States	1973	
3	5.9 h	Bob Hayes	United States	1964	
3	5.9 h	Charlie Greene	United States	1966	
5	5.99 (Note: Time for the slightly longer distance of 55 metres) A	Obadele Thompson	Barbados	1997	
6	6.00	Lee McRae	United States	1986	
7	6.0 h	Roscoe Cook	United States	1959	
7	6.0 h	Roscoe Cook	United States	1960	
7	6.0 h	Sam Perry	United States	1965	
7	6.0 h	Bill Gaines	United States	1966	
7	6.0 h	Bill Gaines	United States	1967	
7	6.0 h	Bill Gaines	United States	1968	
7	6.0 h	John Carlos	United States	1969	
7	6.0 h	Hasely Crawford	Trinidad and Tobago	1973	
7	6.0 h	Hasely Crawford	Trinidad and Tobago	1975	
7	6.0 h	Steve Williams	United States	1976	
12	6.02	Carl Lewis	United States	1983	
12	6.02	Carl Lewis	United States	1987	
12	6.02 A	Leonard Myles-Mills	Ghana	1997	
15	6.03	Sam Graddy	United States	1986	
16	6.04	Stanley Floyd	United States	1981	
16	6.04	Andre Cason	United States	1990	
16	6.04 A	Ato Boldon	Trinidad	1997	
19	6.05	Houston McTear	United States	1978	
19	6.05	Brian Cooper	United States	1988	
21	6.06	Fred Johnson	United States	1985	
21	6.06	Emmit King	United States	1988	
21	6.06	Tim Harden	United States	1996	
21	6.06 A	Keith Williams	United States	1997	
21	6.06 A	Syan Williams	Jamaica	1998	
21	6.06 A	Felix Andam	Ghana	1998	
21	6.06 A	Marcus Brunson	United States	1999	
