= 440-yard dash =

Running race distance

The 440-yard dash, or quarter-mile race, is an obsolete sprint race in track and field competitions.

In many countries, athletes competed in the 440 yard dash (402.336 m) – which corresponds to a quarter mile. Many athletic tracks were 440 yards per lap. In the 19th century it was thought of as a middle distance race.

== History ==
World-record holder Lon Meyers (1858–1899) was the first person to run the 440 in under 50 seconds. In 1947, Herb McKenley of Jamaica set a world record in the event with a time of 46.3 seconds, which he lowered the following year to a new world record of 46.0 seconds. Adolph Plummer took the record under 45 seconds with a 44.9 on May 25, 1963. In 1971, John Smith lowered the world record to 44.5 seconds, which remains the world record.

The 440 yard race distance used imperial measurements, which have been replaced by metric-distance races. The 400 metres (400 meter or 400 m race) is the successor to the 440 yard dash. An athlete who competes in the 400 m may still be referred to as 'quarter-miler' though this rounded, metric distance is 2 1/3 meters shorter than a full 440-yard (quarter mile) race.
