= List of USA Indoor Track and Field Championships winners (men) =

The USA Indoor Track and Field Championships is an annual indoor track and field competition in the sport of athletics currently organized by USA Track & Field. It serves as the national championships for the sport in the United States. The venue of the championships is decided on an annual basis and sometimes indoor combined track and field events championships were held separately.

There was a track and field championship at Madison Square Garden staged by the Amateur Athletic Union in 1888, and in the following years there were demonstrations staged as part of other meets. However, sports historians today acknowledge the 1906 edition to be the first official men's national indoor championships. The men's and women's championships have been held jointly since 1965. Following professionalization of the sport, the running of the national championships was taken over by The Athletics Congress of the USA (TAC) since 1980. TAC rebranded as USA Track & Field (USATF) in 1993.

The national championships for outdoor track and field and other sport of athletics disciplines are held separately from the indoor competition.

== Athletes with the most wins ==
As of 2024, not including relays:

| Rank | Athlete | Wins |
|---|---|---|
| 1st | Tim Seaman | 17 |
| 2nd | Platt Adams | 14 |
| 3rd | Harold Osborn | 13 |
| 3rd | Pat McDonald | 13 |
| 5th | Lance Deal | 12 |
| 6th | John Eller | 10 |
| 6th | Henry Laskau | 10 |
| 6th | Henry Dreyer | 10 |
| 9th | Loren Murchison | 9 |
| 9th | Joe McCluskey | 9 |
| 9th | Mike Conley Sr. | 9 |
| 9th | Parry O'Brien | 9 |

== List of winners ==
=== Track ===
==== 60 m (60 yards, 55 m) ====
USA Indoor Track and Field Championships winners in men's 60-meter dash (60 yards, 55 m)
| 1906–1979 Amateur Athletic Union | 1906: Charles Seitz; 1907: James O'Connell; 1908: Robert Cloughen; 1909: R. W. Gill; 1910: Robert Cloughen; 1911: Alvah Meyer; 1916: Jo Loomis; 1917: Jo Loomis; 1918: William Ganzenmueller; 1919: Loren Murchison; 1920: Loren Murchison; 1921: Ward Conway; 1922: Loren Murchison; 1923: Loren Murchison; 1924: Loren Murchison; 1925: Cecil Coaffee; 1926: Chester Bowman; 1927: Karl Wildermuth; 1928: Karl Wildermuth; 1929: James Daley; 1930: Chester Bowman; 1931: Ira Singer; 1932: Emmett Toppino; 1933: Ralph Metcalfe; 1934: Ralph Metcalfe; 1935: Ben Johnson; 1936: Ralph Metcalfe; 1937: Ben Johnson; 1938: Ben Johnson; 1939: Herbert Thompson; 1940: Mozelle Ellerbe; 1941: Herbert Thompson; 1942: Barney Ewell; 1943: Herbert Thompson; 1944: Ed Conwell; 1945: Barney Ewell; 1946: Tom Carey; 1947: Ed Conwell; 1948: Ed Conwell; 1949: Bill Dwyer; 1950: Andy Stanfield; 1951: Ed Conwell; 1952: John O'Connell; 1953: John Haines; 1954: John Haines; 1955: John Haines; 1956: John Haines; 1957: Ira Murchison; 1958: Ed Collymore; 1959: Paul Winder; 1960: Paul Winder; 1961: Frank Budd; 1962: Frank Budd; 1963: Sam Perry; 1964: Bob Hayes; 1965: Sam Perry; 1966: Bill Gaines; 1967: Bill Gaines; 1968: Bill Gaines; 1969: Charles Greene; 1970: Charles Greene; 1971: Jean-Louis Ravelomanantsoa (MAD), Charles Greene (2nd); 1972: Delano Meriwether; 1973: Hasely Crawford (TRI), Herb Washington (2nd); 1974: Herb Washington; 1975: Hasely Crawford (TRI), Steve Williams (2nd); 1976: Steve Williams; 1977: Steve Riddick; 1978: Houston McTear; 1979: Steve Riddick |
| 1980–1992 The Athletics Congress | 1980: Curtis Dickey; 1981: Stanley Floyd; 1982: Ron Brown; 1983: Carl Lewis; 1984: Emmit King; 1985: Al Lawrence (JAM), Emmit King (2nd); 1986: Lee McRae; 1987: Lee McRae; 1988: Emmit King; 1989: Leroy Burrell; 1990: Brian Cooper, Tony Dees; 1991: Andrés Simón (CUB), Andre Carson (2nd); 1992: Leroy Burrell |
| 1993–present USA Track & Field | 1993: Jon Drummond; 1994: Dennis Mitchell; 1995: Tim Harden; 1996: Donovan Powell (JAM), Keith Williams (2nd); 1997: Randall Evans; 1998: Kenny Brokenburr; 1999: Tim Harden; 2000: Jon Drummond; 2001: Maurice Greene; 2002: Terrence Trammell; 2003: Justin Gatlin; 2004: Shawn Crawford; 2005: Mardy Scales; 2006: Leonard Scott; 2007: Dabryan Blanton; 2008: Mike Rodgers; 2009: Mark Jelks; 2010: Mike Rodgers; 2011: Mike Rodgers; 2012: Trell Kimmons; 2013: D'Angelo Cherry; 2014: Marvin Bracy; 2015: Marvin Bracy; 2016: Marvin Bracy; 2017: Ronnie Baker; 2018: Christian Coleman; 2019: Demek Kemp; 2020: Christian Coleman; 2022: Christian Coleman; 2023: J.T. Smith; 2024: Noah Lyles |
Held over 60 yards from 1906 to 1986, with the exception of 1933–39 (60 meters). Held over 55 meters from 1987–90. 75-yard winners (1906-15) are listed separately.

==== 400 m (440 yards, 300 m, 300 yards) ====
USA Indoor Track and Field Championships winners in men's 400 m (440 yards, 300 m, 300 yards)
| 1906–1979 Amateur Athletic Union | 1906: Lawson Robertson; 1907: LeRoy Dorland; 1908: LeRoy Dorland; 1909: LeRoy Dorland; 1910: LeRoy Dorland; 1911: LeRoy Dorland; 1913: Fred Burns; 1914: Alvah Meyer; 1915: Stanley Rose; 1916: Andrew Kelly; 1917: Andrew Kelly; 1918: Sherman Landers; 1919: Loren Murchison; 1920: Loren Murchison; 1921: James O'Brien; 1922: Allen Woodring; 1923: Loren Murchison; 1924: Loren Murchison; 1925: Sam Rosen; 1926: Manny Lochnicht; 1927: Lanny Ross; 1928: Lanny Ross; 1929: Charles Engle; 1930: John Lewis; 1931: Bill Carr; 1932: Horace Whitney |
| 1980–1992 The Athletics Congress | 1981: Ed Yearwood; 1982: Walter McCoy; 1983: Clinton Davis, Cliff Wiley; 1984: Clinton Davis; 1985: Antonio McKay; 1986: Antonio McKay; 1987: Antonio McKay; 1988: Antonio McKay; 1989: Antonio McKay; 1990: Michael Johnson; 1991: Michael Johnson; 1992: Willie Caldwell |
| 1993–present USA Track & Field | 1993: Antonio McKay; 1994: Darnell Hall; 1995: Michael Johnson; 1996: Michael Johnson; 1997: Derek Mills; 1998: Alvin Harrison; 1999: Angelo Taylor; 2000: James Davis; 2001: James Davis; 2002: Brandon Couts; 2003: Tyree Washington; 2004: Milton Campbell; 2005: Bershawn Jackson; 2006: Milton Campbell; 2007: Greg Nixon; 2008: David Neville; 2009: Jamaal Torrance; 2010: Bershawn Jackson; 2011: Michael Courtney; 2012: Gil Roberts; 2013: Jeremy Wariner; 2014: Kyle Clemons; 2015: Manteo Mitchell; 2016: Vernon Norwood; 2017: Noah Lyles; 2018: Michael Cherry; 2019: Dontavius Wright; 2020: Rashard Clark; 2022: Trevor Bassitt; 2023: Justin Robinson; 2024: Brian Faust |
| Notes | * Distances have varied as follows: 300 yards (1906-1932), 440 yards (1981–1986), 400 meters (1987–present) alternating with 300 meters in odd numbered years 2015-2019 |

==== 600 m (600 yards, 500 m) ====
USA Indoor Track and Field Championships winners in men's 600 m (600 yards, 500 m)
| 1906–1979 Amateur Athletic Union | 1906: Eli Parsons; 1907: Eli Parsons; 1908: Mel Sheppard; 1909: Mel Sheppard; 1910: Harry Gissing; 1911: Abel Kiviat; 1913: Abel Kiviat; 1914: Thomas Halpin; 1915: Thomas Halpin; 1916: William Bingham; 1917: Earl Eby; 1918: Marvin Gustavson; 1919: Jack Sellers; 1920: Earl Eby; 1921: Fred Murrey; 1922: Sid Leslie; 1923: Earl Eby; 1924: Walter Mulvihill; 1925: Vincent Lally; 1926: Horatio Fitch; 1927: George Leness; 1928: Phil Edwards (BGU), George Leness (2nd); 1929: Phil Edwards (BGU), Eddie Blake (2nd); 1930: Phil Edwards (BGU), Eddie Roll (2nd); 1931: Phil Edwards (BGU), Eddie Blake (4th); 1932: Alex Wilson (CAN), Edwin Roll (2nd); 1933: Milton Sandler; 1934: Milton Sandler; 1935: Milton Sandler; 1936: Edward O'Brien; 1937: Edward O'Brien; 1938: Jim Herbert; 1939: Charles Beetham; 1940: Charles Belcher; 1941: Jim Herbert; 1942: Roy Cochran; 1943: Lewis Smith; 1944: Bob Ufer; 1945: Elmore Harris; 1946: Elmore Harris; 1947: George Guida; 1948: Dave Bolen; 1949: Dave Bolen; 1950: Hugo Maiocco; 1951: Hugo Maiocco; 1952: Charles Moore; 1953: Mal Whitfield; 1954: Reggie Pearman; 1955: Charles Jenkins Sr.; 1956: Lou Jones; 1957: Charles Jenkins Sr.; 1958: Charles Jenkins Sr.; 1959: Josh Culbreath; 1960: Tom Murphy; 1961: Eddie Southern; 1962: Bill Crothers (CAN), Jack Yerman (2nd); 1963: Jack Yerman; 1964: Charles Buchta; 1965: Jack Yerman; 1966: Theron Lewis; 1967: Jim Kemp; 1968: Martin McGrady; 1969: Martin McGrady; 1970: Martin McGrady; 1971: Andrzej Badeński (POL), Tom Ulan (3rd); 1972: Lee Evans; 1973: Fred Newhouse; 1974: Wes Williams; 1975: Wes Williams; 1976: Fred Sowerby (ANT), Stan Vinson (2nd); 1977: Fred Sowerby (ANT), Kevin Prince (2nd); 1978: Stan Vinson; 1979: Mike Solomon (TRI), Stanley Vincent (3rd) |
| 1980–1992 The Athletics Congress | 1980: Mark Enyeart; 1981: Mike Solomon (TRI), Mark Enyeart (3rd); 1982: Fred Sowerby (ANT), Stanley Redwine (2nd); 1983: Eugene Sanders; 1984: Mark Rowe; 1985: Elvis Forde (BAR), Anthony Tufariello (2nd); 1986: Elvis Forde (BAR), Marcus Sanders (3rd); 1987: Ian Morris (TRI), Charles Jenkins Jr. (3rd); 1988: Ken Lowery; 1989: Mark Rowe; 1990: David Patrick; 1991: Andrew Valmon; 1992: Mark Everett |
| 1993–present USA Track & Field | 1993: Mark Everett; 2015: Casimir Loxsom; 2017: Erik Sowinski; 2019: Donavan Brazier |
| Notes | *Distances have varied as follows: 600 yards (1906–1986), 500 meters (1987–1993) except 600 meters (odd numbered years since 2015) |

==== 800 m (1000 yards, 1000 m) ====
USA Indoor Track and Field Championships winners in men's 800 m (1000 yards, 1000 m)
| 1906–1979 Amateur Athletic Union | 1906: Mel Sheppard; 1907: Mel Sheppard; 1908: Harry Gissing; 1909: Harry Gissing; 1910: Harry Gissing; 1911: Abel Kiviat; 1913: Abel Kiviat; 1914: Abel Kiviat; 1915: David Caldwell; 1916: John Overton; 1917: John Overton; 1918: Joie Ray; 1919: Joie Ray; 1920: Joie Ray; 1921: Sid Leslie; 1922: Harold Cutbill; 1923: Ray Watson; 1924: George Marsters; 1925: Lloyd Hahn; 1926: Ray Dodge; 1927: Lloyd Hahn; 1928: Ray Conger; 1929: Ray Conger; 1930: Paul Martin (SUI), Ray Conger (2nd); 1931: Ray Conger; 1932: Dale Letts; 1933: Glen Dawson; 1934: Chuck Hornbostel; 1935: Glen Dawson; 1936: Chuck Hornbostel; 1937: Elroy Robinson; 1938: Frank Slater; 1939: John Borican; 1940: John Borican; 1941: John Borican; 1942: John Borican; 1943: James Rafferty; 1944: Les Eisenhart; 1945: Don Burnham; 1946: Fred Sickinger; 1947: Bill McGuire; 1948: Phil Thigpen; 1949: Bob Mealey; 1950: Roscoe Lee Browne; 1951: Roscoe Lee Browne; 1952: Don Gehrmann; 1953: Heinz Ulzheimer (FRG), Don Gehrmann (2nd); 1954: Mal Whitfield; 1955: Arnie Sowell; 1956: Arnie Sowell; 1957: Arnie Sowell; 1958: Zbigniew Orywał (POL), Joe Soprano (2nd); 1959: Zbigniew Orywał (POL), Arnie Sowell (3rd); 1960: Cary Weisiger; 1961: Ernie Cunliffe; 1962: John Reilly; 1963: Bill Crothers (CAN), Robin Lingle (2nd); 1964: Ernie Cunliffe; 1965: Ted Nelson; 1966: Ted Nelson; 1967: Preston Davis; 1968: Tom Von Ruden; 1969: Herb Germann; 1970: Juris Luzins; 1971: Tom Von Ruden; 1972: Jozef Plachý (TCH), Ron Nehring (3rd); 1973: Marcel Philippe (FRA), Mark Winzenried (5th); 1974: Rick Wohlhuter; 1975: Rick Wohlhuter; 1976: Rick Wohlhuter; 1977: Mike Boit (KEN), Reggie Clark (3rd); 1978: Gideon Terer (KEN), Bill Martin (2nd); 1979: Evans White |
| 1980–1992 The Athletics Congress | 1980: Bill Martin; 1981: Bill Martin; 1982: Don Paige; 1983: Mark Belger; 1984: Don Paige; 1985: Edwin Koech (KEN), Ray Brown (2nd); 1986: Johnny Gray; 1987: Stanley Redwine; 1988: Ray Brown; 1989: Ray Brown; 1990: Ray Brown; 1991: Ray Brown; 1992: Freddie Williams (CAN), Ray Brown (3rd) |
| 1993–present USA Track & Field | 1993: Stanley Redwine; 1994: David Kiptoo (KEN), Sunder Nix (2nd); 1995: Joseph Tengelei (KEN), José Parrilla (2nd); 1996: Brandon Rock; 1997: Mark Everett; 1998: Mark Everett; 1999: Khadevis Robinson; 2000: Bryan Woodward; 2001: Trinity Gray; 2002: Derrick Peterson; 2003: David Krummenacker; 2004: Michael Stember; 2005: Kevin Hicks; 2006: Khadevis Robinson; 2007: Nick Symmonds; 2008: Khadevis Robinson; 2009: Khadevis Robinson; 2010: Nick Symmonds; 2011: Duane Solomon; 2012: Duane Solomon; 2013: Erik Sowinski; 2014: Erik Sowinski; 2015: Robby Andrews; 2016: Boris Berian; 2017: Clayton Murphy; 2018: Donavan Brazier; 2019: Clayton Murphy; 2020: Bryce Hoppel; 2022: Bryce Hoppel; 2023: Bryce Hoppel; 2024: Bryce Hoppel; 2025: Josh Hoey |
| Notes | *Distances have varied as follows: 1000 yards (1906–1986), 800 meters (1987–date) except 1000 meters (2015, 2017,2019) |

==== Mile (1500 m) ====
USA Indoor Track and Field Championships winners in men's mile (1500 m)
| 1906–1979 Amateur Athletic Union | 1932: Gene Venzke; 1933: Gene Venzke; 1934: Glenn Cunningham; 1935: Glenn Cunningham; 1936: Gene Venzke; 1937: Archie San Romani; 1938: Glenn Cunningham; 1939: Glenn Cunningham; 1940: Charles Fenske; 1941: Walter Mehl; 1942: Gil Dodds; 1943: Frank Dixon; 1944: Gil Dodds; 1945: James Rafferty; 1946: Leslie MacMitchell; 1947: Gil Dodds; 1948: Tom Quinn; 1949: Willem Slijkhuis (NED), Neil Pratt (3rd); 1950: John Joe Barry (IRL), Fred Wilt (2nd); 1951: Fred Wilt; 1952: Bill Mack; 1953: Fred Dwyer; 1954: Josy Barthel (LUX), Fred Wilt (2nd); 1955: Wes Santee; 1956: Ron Delany (IRL), Fred Dwyer (3rd); 1957: Ron Delany (IRL), Fred Dwyer (3rd); 1958: Ron Delany (IRL), James Grelle (3rd); 1959: Ron Delany (IRL), Pete Close (4th); 1960: Phil Coleman; 1961: Jim Beatty; 1962: Jim Beatty; 1963: Jim Beatty; 1964: Ergas Leps (CAN), Vic Zwolak (2nd); 1965: Jim Grelle; 1966: Jim Grelle; 1967: Sam Bair; 1968: Preston Davis; 1969: Henryk Szordykowski (POL), Marty Liquori (2nd); 1970: Marty Liquori; 1971: Henryk Szordykowski (POL), John Mason (2nd); 1972: Byron Dyce (JAM), Bruce Fischer (3rd); 1973: Marty Liquori; 1974: John Walker (NZL), Michael Slack (2nd); 1975: Filbert Bayi (TAN), Paul Cummings (2nd); 1976: Filbert Bayi (TAN), Paul Cummings (2nd); 1977: Filbert Bayi (TAN), Joseph Dubina (3rd); 1978: Eamonn Coghlan (IRL), Steve Lacy (3rd); 1979: Steve Scott |
| 1980–1992 The Athletics Congress | 1980: Craig Masback; 1981: Steve Scott; 1982: Jim Spivey; 1983: Eamonn Coghlan (IRL), Steve Scott (2nd); 1984: Steve Scott; 1985: Sydney Maree; 1986: Marcus O'Sullivan (IRL), Marcus O'Sullivan (IRL), Mark Fricker (3rd), Kevin Johnson (3rd); 1987: Eamonn Coghlan (IRL), Jim Spivey (3rd); 1988: Marcus O'Sullivan (IRL), Brian Abshire (2nd); 1989: Frank O'Mara (IRL), Jeff Atkinson (3rd); 1990: Marcus O'Sullivan (IRL), Steve Scott; 1991: Noureddine Morceli (ALG), Eric Henry (3rd); 1992: Noureddine Morceli (ALG), Jeff Atkinson (5th) |
| 1993–present USA Track & Field | 1993: Noureddine Morceli (ALG), Steve Holman (3rd); 1994: William Tanui (KEN), Marcus Dunbar (3rd); 1995: Niall Bruton (IRL), Erik Nedeau (3rd); 1996: Steve Holman; 1997: Jason Pyrah; 1998: Paul McMullen; 1999: Matt Holthaus; 2000: Jason Pyrah; 2001: Seneca Lassiter; 2002: Jason Lunn; 2003: Jason Lunn; 2004: Rob Myers; 2005: Scott McGowan; 2006: Chris Lukezic; 2007: Alan Webb; 2008: Rob Myers; 2009: Rob Myers; 2010: Leonel Manzano; 2011: Jeff See; 2012: Leonel Manzano; 2013: Will Leer; 2014: Lopez Lomong; 2015: Matthew Centrowitz Jr.; 2016: Matthew Centrowitz Jr.; 2017: Ben Blankenship; 2018: Paul Chelimo; 2019: Craig Engels; 2020: Josh Thompson; 2022: Cole Hocker; 2023: Sam Prakel; 2024: Cole Hocker; 2025: Hobbs Kessler |
| Notes | *Distances have varied as follows: Mile (1940–2002) and 1932, 2007 and odd numbered years since 2011, 1500 meters (1933–1939), (2003–6, 2008–2010) and even numbered years since 2010 |

==== 3000 m (2 miles, 5000 m, 3 miles) ====
USA Indoor Track and Field Championships winners in men's 3000 m (5000 m, 2 miles, 3 miles)
| 1906–1979 Amateur Athletic Union | 1899: Alec Grant; 1900: Alec Grant; 1901: Alec Grant; 1903: Alec Grant; 1904: George Bonhag; 1905: George Bonhag; 1906: George Bonhag; 1907: George Bonhag; 1908: Mike Driscoll; 1909: Mike Driscoll; 1910: Joseph Monument; 1911: George Bonhag; 1913: William Kramer; 1914: Harry Smith; 1915: Michael Devaney; 1916: Joie Ray; 1917: John Ryan; 1918: Edward Garvey; 1919: Gordon Nightingale; 1920: Harry Helm; 1921: Max Bohland; 1922: John Romig; 1923: Joie Ray; 1924: Joie Ray; 1925: Paavo Nurmi (FIN), Harold Kennedy (2nd); 1926: William Goodwin; 1927: William Goodwin; 1928: Leo Lermond; 1929: Edvin Wide (SWE), Robert Dalrymple (2nd); 1930: Joe McCluskey; 1931: Leo Lermond; 1932: George Lermond; 1933: George Lermond; 1934: John Follows; 1935: John Follows; 1936: Norm Bright; 1937: Norm Bright; 1938: Don Lash; 1939: Don Lash; 1940: Greg Rice; 1941: Greg Rice; 1942: Greg Rice; 1943: Greg Rice; 1944: Oliver Hunter; 1945: Forest Efaw; 1946: Forest Efaw; 1947: Curt Stone; 1948: Curt Stone; 1949: Gaston Reiff (BEL), Fred Wilt (3rd); 1950: Curt Stone; 1951: Curt Stone; 1952: Horace Ashenfelter; 1953: Horace Ashenfelter; 1954: Horace Ashenfelter; 1955: Horace Ashenfelter; 1956: Horace Ashenfelter; 1957: John Macy (POL), Alex Breckenridge (2nd); 1958: Veliša Mugoša (YUG), John Macy (2nd); 1959: Bill Dellinger; 1960: Al Lawrence (AUS), Lew Stieglitz (2nd); 1961: Bruce Kidd (CAN), John Macy (3rd); 1962: Bruce Kidd (CAN), Jared Nourse (4th); 1963: Michel Bernard (FRA), Bob Schul (2nd); 1964: Ron Clarke (AUS), Pete McArdle (2nd); 1965: Billy Mills; 1966: Lajos Mecser (HUN), Tracy Smith (2nd); 1967: Tracy Smith; 1968: George Young; 1969: George Young; 1970: Art DuLong; 1971: Frank Shorter; 1972: Emiel Puttemans (BEL), Leonard Hilton (2nd); 1973: Tracy Smith; 1974: Dick Tayler (NZL), Frank Shorter (2nd); 1975: Miruts Yifter (ETH), Pat Manders (3rd); 1976: Suleiman Nyambui (TAN), Greg Fredericks (2nd); 1977: Suleiman Nyambui (TAN), Garry Bjorklund (3rd); 1978: Suleiman Nyambui (TAN), Marty Liquori (2nd); 1979: Marty Liquori |
| 1980–1992 The Athletics Congress | 1980: Eamonn Coghlan (IRL), Bruce Bickford (3rd); 1981: Eamonn Coghlan (IRL), Dick Buerkle (2nd); 1982: Paul Cummings; 1983: Doug Padilla; 1984: Doug Padilla; 1985: Doug Padilla; 1986: Doug Padilla; 1987: Doug Padilla; 1988: Jim Spivey; 1989: Steve Scott; 1990: Doug Padilla; 1991: Terry Brahm; 1992: Doug Padilla |
| 1993–present USA Track & Field | 1993: Joe Falcon; 1994: Moses Kiptanui (KEN), Matt Giusto (2nd); 1995: Bob Kennedy; 1996: Bob Kennedy; 1997: Todd Williams; 1998: Dan Browne; 1999: Adam Goucher; 2000: Ray Appenheimer; 2001: Tim Broe; 2002: Tim Broe; 2003: Jonathon Riley; 2004: Jonathon Riley; 2005: Jonathon Riley; 2006: Adam Goucher; 2007: Matt Tegenkamp; 2008: Matt Tegenkamp; 2009: David Torrence; 2010: Bernard Lagat; 2011: Bernard Lagat; 2012: Bernard Lagat; 2013: Will Leer; 2014: Bernard Lagat; 2015: Ryan Hill; 2016: Ryan Hill; 2017: Paul Chelimo; 2018: Paul Chelimo; 2019: Drew Hunter; 2020: Paul Chelimo; 2022: Cole Hocker; 2023: Sam Prakel; 2024: Yared Nuguse; 2025: Hobbs Kessler |
| Notes | * Events before 1906 are considered unofficial. Distances have varied as follows: 2 Miles (1899–1931) and odd numbered years since 2015, 5000 meters (1933–1939), 3 Miles 1932, (1940–1986), and 3000 meters (1987–2014) and even numbered years since 2014 |

==== 60 m hurdles (70 yards hurdles, 65 m hurdles, 60 yards hurdles, 55 m hurdles) ====
USA Indoor Track and Field Championships winners in men's 60 m hurdles (70 yards hurdles, 65 m hurdles, 60 yards hurdles, 55 m hurdles)
| 1927–1979 Amateur Athletic Union | 1910: John Hartranft; 1911: John Eller; 1913: James Wendell; 1914: John Eller; 1915: Derrill Trenholm; 1916: John Eller; 1917: Earl Thomson (CAN), Arthur Engels (2nd); 1918: Harold Barron; 1919: Walker Smith; 1920: Walker Smith; 1921: Harold Barron; 1922: Harold Barron; 1923: Karl Anderson; 1924: Herbert Meyer; 1925: Harold Osborn; 1926: George Guthrie; 1927: George Guthrie; 1928: Weems Baskin; 1929: Monty Wells; 1930: Lee Sentman; 1931: Percy Beard; 1932: Percy Beard; 1933: Percy Beard; 1934: John Collier; 1935: Percy Beard; 1936: Sam Allen; 1937: Sam Allen; 1938: Forrest Towns; 1939: Allan Tolmich; 1940: Allan Tolmich; 1941: Allan Tolmich; 1942: Fred Wolcott; 1943: Robert Wright; 1944: Ed Dugger; 1945: Ed Dugger; 1946: Ed Dugger; 1947: Harrison Dillard; 1948: Harrison Dillard; 1949: Harrison Dillard; 1950: Harrison Dillard; 1951: Harrison Dillard; 1952: Harrison Dillard; 1953: Harrison Dillard; 1954: Jack Davis; 1955: Harrison Dillard; 1956: Lee Calhoun; 1957: Lee Calhoun; 1958: Hayes Jones; 1959: Elias Gilbert; 1960: Hayes Jones; 1961: Hayes Jones; 1962: Hayes Jones; 1963: Hayes Jones; 1964: Hayes Jones; 1965: Ralph Boston; 1966: Willie Davenport; 1967: Willie Davenport; 1968: Earl McCullouch; 1969: Willie Davenport; 1970: Willie Davenport; 1971: Willie Davenport; 1972: Rod Milburn; 1973: Rod Milburn; 1974: Thomas Hill; 1975: Charles Foster; 1976: Guy Drut (FRA), Tom Hill (2nd); 1977: Larry Shipp; 1978: Charles Foster; 1979: Renaldo Nehemiah |
| 1980–1992 The Athletics Congress | 1980: Rod Milburn; 1981: Alejandro Casañas (CUB), Rod Milburn (2nd); 1982: Tonie Campbell; 1983: Greg Foster; 1984: Greg Foster; 1985: Greg Foster; 1986: Mark McKoy (CAN), Al Joyner (2nd); 1987: Greg Foster; 1988: Greg Foster; 1989: Tonie Campbell; 1990: Tony Dees; 1991: Greg Foster; 1992: Tony Dees |
| 1993–present USA Track & Field | 1993: Tony Dees; 1994: Tony Dees; 1995: Allen Johnson; 1996: Courtney Hawkins; 1997: Reggie Torian; 1998: Duane Ross; 1999: Reggie Torian; 2000: Terrence Trammell; 2001: Terrence Trammell; 2002: Allen Johnson; 2003: Allen Johnson; 2004: Allen Johnson; 2005: Joel Brown; 2006: Terrence Trammell; 2007: Ron Bramlett; 2008: David Oliver; 2009: Terrence Trammell; 2010: Terrence Trammell; 2011: Omo Osaghae; 2012: Aries Merritt; 2013: Omo Osaghae; 2014: Omo Osaghae; 2015: Aleec Harris; 2016: Jarret Eaton; 2017: Aries Merritt; 2018: Jarret Eaton; 2019: Devon Allen; 2020: Aaron Mallett; 2022: Grant Holloway; 2023: Freddie Crittenden; 2024: Trey Cunningham |
| Notes | * Distances have varied as follows: 70 yards from 1910-32 and 1940-41, 65 m from 1933-39, 60 yards from 1942-86, 55 m from 1987-90, 60 m since 1991. |

==== Racewalking (mile walk, 3000 m walk, 2 miles walk, 3 miles walk) ====
USA Indoor Track and Field Championships winners in men's racewalking (1500 m walk, mile walk, 3000 m walk, 2 miles walk, 5000 m walk, 3 miles walk)
| Mile walk (1500 m walk) | 1907: Sam Liebgold; 1908: Sam Liebgold; 1909: Sam Liebgold; 1920: Joseph Pearman; 1921: Richard Remer; 1922: William Plant; 1923: William Plant; 1924: William Plant; 1925: Alexander Zellar; 1926: Harry Hinkel; 1927: William Plant; 1928: Harry Hinkel; 1929: Harry Hinkel; 1930: Michael Pecora; 1931: William Carlson; 1932: Michael Pecora; 1933: William Carlson; 1934: Charles Eschenbach; 1935: Henry Cieman (CAN), Charles Eschenbach (2nd); 1936: Charles Eschenbach; 1937: Nat Jaeger; 1938: Otto Kotraba; 1939: Otto Kotraba; 1940: Charles Eschenbach; 1941: Nat Jaeger; 1942: Al Cicerone; 1943: Sune Carlsson (SWE), Joe Medgyesi (2nd); 1944: Joe Medgyesi; 1945: Joe Medgyesi; 1946: Joe Medgyesi; 1947: Ernie Weber; 1948: Henry Laskau; 1949: Henry Laskau; 1950: Henry Laskau; 1951: Henry Laskau; 1952: Henry Laskau; 1953: Henry Laskau; 1954: Henry Laskau; 1955: Henry Laskau; 1956: Henry Laskau; 1957: Henry Laskau; 1958: John Humcke; 1959: John Humcke; 1960: Frank Sipos (HUN), Jack Blackburn (2nd); 1961: Ronald Zinn; 1962: Ronald Zinn; 1963: Ronald Zinn; 1964: Ron Laird; 1965: Ronald Zinn; 1966: Rudy Haluza; 1967: Don DeNoon; 1968: Ron Laird; 1969: Dave Romansky; 1970: Dave Romansky; 1971: Ron Laird; 1972: Dave Romansky; 1973: Ron Daniel; 2005: Tim Seaman; 2006: Tim Seaman |
| 3000 m walk (2 miles walk) | 1913: Dick Gifford; 1914: Richard Remer; 1915: Edward Renz; 1916: George Goulding (CAN), Edward Renz (2nd); 1917: Richard Remer; 1918: Richard Remer; 1919: Edward Renz; 1974: Larry Walker; 1975: Ron Daniel; 1976: Ron Laird; 1977: Todd Scully; 1978: Todd Scully; 1979: Todd Scully; 1980: Todd Scully; 1981: Ray Sharp; 1982: Jim Heiring; 1983: Ray Sharp; 1984: Jim Heiring; 1985: Jim Heiring; 1986: Jim Heiring; 2005: Tim Seaman; 2006: Tim Seaman; 2011: Patrick Stroupe; 2012: Trevor Barron; 2013: Tim Seaman; 2015: Nick Christie; 2016: John Nunn; 2017: John Nunn; 2018: Nick Christie; 2019: Nick Christie; 2020: Nick Christie; 2023: Nick Christie; 2024: Nick Christie |
| 5000 m walk (3 miles walk) | 1907: Sam Liebgold; 1908: Sam Liebgold; 1909: Sam Liebgold; 1910: Sam Liebgold; 1911: Frank Kaiser; 1987: Tim Lewis; 1988: Guillaume LeBlanc (CAN), Tim Lewis (2nd); 1989: Tim Lewis; 1990: Tim Berrett (GBR), Doug Fournier (2nd); 1991: Doug Fournier; 1992: Gary Morgan; 1993: Allen James; 1994: Jonathan Matthews; 1995: Allen James; 1996: Allen James; 1997: Allen James; 1998: Tim Seaman; 1999: Tim Seaman; 2000: Tim Seaman; 2001: Tim Seaman; 2002: Tim Seaman; 2003: Tim Seaman; 2004: Tim Seaman; 2005: Tim Seaman; 2006: Tim Seaman; 2007: Tim Seaman; 2008: Matthew Boyles; 2009: Tim Seaman; 2010: Tim Seaman |
| Notes | * From 1906 to 1979, events were conducted by the Amateur Athletic Union. Events from 1980 to 1992 were conducted under The Athletics Congress. Events thereafter were conducted by USA Track & Field. Distances have varied as follows: Mile walk all years except 1933-1939 when 1500 m walk was contested, 2 miles walk until 1986 (3000 m walk since except for odd years since 2015), 3 miles walk until 1911 (5000 m walk since). |

=== Field ===
==== High jump (standing high jump) ====
USA Indoor Track and Field Championships winners in men's high jump (standing high jump)
| Standing high jump | 1906: Ray Ewry; 1907: Ray Ewry; 1908: John Biller, Platt Adams; 1909: Platt Adams; 1910: Platt Adams; 1913: Platt Adams; 1915: William Taylor; 1916: William Taylor; 1917: William Taylor; 1918: Leo Goehring; 1919: William Taylor; 1920: Ben Adams; 1921: Ed Emes; 1922: Edward Emes; 1923: Thomas Hoskins; 1924: Harry Sweitzer; 1925: Harold Osborn; 1926: Hans Hedberg; 1927: Hans Hedberg; 1928: Harold Osborn; 1929: Harold Osborn; 1930: Harold Osborn; 1931: Harold Osborn |
| High jump | 1906: Herbert Gidney; 1907: Harry Porter; 1908: Harry Porter; 1909: Harry Porter; 1910: Harry Grumpelt; 1911: Samuel Lawrence; 1913: John Johnstone; 1914: Eugene Jennings; 1915: Wesley Oler; 1916: Jo Loomis; 1917: Jo Loomis; 1918: Egon Erickson; 1919: Walter Whalen; 1920: Walter Whalen; 1921: Richmond Landon; 1922: Leroy Brown; 1923: Harold Osborn; 1924: Harold Osborn; 1925: Harold Osborn; 1926: Harold Osborn; 1927: Charles W. Major; 1928: Anton Burg; 1929: Charles W. Major; 1930: Anton Burg; 1931: Anton Burg; 1932: George Spitz; 1933: George Spitz; 1934: Walter Marty, George Spitz; 1935: Cornelius Johnson; 1936: Ed Burke; 1937: Ed Burke; 1938: Lloyd Thompson; 1939: Mel Walker; 1940: Arthur Byrnes; 1941: Mel Walker; 1942: Adam Berry, Josh Williamson; 1943: Bill Vessie, Josh Williamson; 1944: Dave Albritton, Bill Vessie; 1945: Ken Wiesner, Josh Williamson; 1946: John Vislocky; 1947: John Vislocky; 1948: John Vislocky; 1949: Dick Phillips; 1950: John Vislocky; 1951: John Heintzmann, Jack Razetto, Josh Williamson; 1952: Lewis Hall; 1953: Lewis Hall; 1954: Herman Wyatt; 1955: Lewis Hall, Ernie Shelton; 1956: Ernie Shelton; 1957: Phil Reavis; 1958: Herman Wyatt; 1959: John Thomas; 1960: John Thomas; 1961: Valeriy Brumel (URS), John Thomas (2nd); 1962: John Thomas; 1963: Valeriy Brumel (URS), John Thomas (2nd); 1964: John Thomas; 1965: Valeriy Brumel (URS), Gene Johnson (3rd); 1966: John Thomas; 1967: John Rambo; 1968: Valentin Gavrilov (URS), Steve Kelly (2nd); 1969: John Rambo; 1970: Otis Burrell; 1971: Reynaldo Brown; 1972: Gene White; 1973: Dwight Stones; 1974: Tom Woods; 1975: Dwight Stones; 1976: Robert Forget (CAN), Bill Knoedel (2nd); 1977: Paul Underwood; 1978: Dwight Stones; 1979: Benn Fields; 1980: Franklin Jacobs; 1981: Jeff Woodard; 1982: Dwight Stones; 1983: Tyke Peacock; 1984: Dennis Lewis; 1985: Jim Howard; 1986: Jim Howard; 1987: Igor Paklin (URS), Jim Howard (2nd); 1988: Igor Paklin (URS), Jim Howard (2nd), Tom McCants (2nd); 1989: Troy Kemp (BAH), Tom McCants (2nd); 1990: Hollis Conway; 1991: Javier Sotomayor (CUB), Hollis Conway (2nd); 1992: Hollis Conway; 1993: Hollis Conway; 1994: Hollis Conway; 1995: Tony Barton; 1996: Charles Austin; 1997: Charles Austin; 1998: Sam Hill; 1999: Henry Patterson; 2000: Matt Hemingway; 2001: Nathan Leeper; 2002: Nathan Leeper; 2003: Charles Austin; 2004: Jamie Nieto; 2005: Tora Harris; 2006: Adam Shunk; 2007: Tora Harris; 2008: Andra Manson; 2009: Andra Manson; 2010: Jesse Williams; 2011: Jesse Williams; 2012: Jesse Williams; 2013: Dusty Jonas; 2014: Erik Kynard; 2015: Erik Kynard; 2016: Erik Kynard; 2017: Erik Kynard; 2018: Erik Kynard; 2019: Jeron Robinson; 2020: Erik Kynard; 2022: JuVaughn Harrison; 2023: Shelby McEwen; 2024: Shelby McEwen |
| Notes | * From 1906 to 1979, events were conducted by the Amateur Athletic Union. Events from 1980 to 1992 were conducted under The Athletics Congress. Events thereafter were conducted by USA Track & Field. |

==== Long jump (standing long jump) ====
USA Indoor Track and Field Championships winners in men's long jump (standing long jump)
| 1906–1979 Amateur Athletic Union | 1906: Ray Ewry; 1907: Ray Ewry; 1908: Platt Adams; 1909: Ray Ewry; 1910: Ray Ewry; 1911: Samuel Lawrence; 1913: Platt Adams; 1914: Platt Adams; 1915: William Taylor; 1916: Platt Adams; 1917: J. C. Hoskins; 1918: Sam Kronman; 1919: William Taylor; 1920: Irving Reed; 1921: Irving Reed; 1922: Irving Reed; 1923: Irving Reed; 1924: Irving Reed; 1925: Harold Osborn; 1926: Harold Osborn; 1927: Harold Osborn; 1928: William Werner; 1929: William Werner; 1930: William Werner; 1931: William Werner; 1932: Everett Utterback; 1933: Theodore Smith; 1934: Jesse Owens; 1935: Jesse Owens; 1936: Sam Richardson (CAN), Ed Gordon (2nd); 1937: Sam Richardson (CAN), Anson Perina (2nd); 1938: Ed Gordon; 1939: Ed Gordon; 1940: Anson Perina; 1941: Lockhart Rogers; 1942: José de Assis (BRA), Barney Ewell (2nd); 1943: Barney Ewell; 1944: Barney Ewell; 1945: Barney Ewell; 1946: Sam Richardson (CAN), Max Minor (2nd); 1947: Herb Douglas; 1948: Lorenzo Wright; 1949: Herb Douglas; 1950: Buddy Fowlkes; 1951: Andy Stanfield; 1952: Lorenzo Wright; 1953: Meredith Gourdine; 1954: Neville Price (SAF), George Brown (2nd); 1955: Rosslyn Range; 1956: Rosslyn Range; 1957: George Shaw; 1958: Greg Bell; 1959: Mike Herman; 1960: Bo Roberson; 1961: Ralph Boston; 1962: Charles Mays; 1963: Igor Ter-Ovanesyan (URS), Ralph Boston (2nd); 1964: Charles Mays; 1965: Igor Ter-Ovanesyan (URS), Ralph Boston (2nd); 1966: Norman Tate; 1967: Bob Beamon; 1968: Bob Beamon; 1969: Norman Tate; 1970: Norman Tate; 1971: Norman Tate; 1972: Henry Hines; 1973: Randy Williams; 1974: Jerry Proctor; 1975: Arnie Robinson; 1976: Larry Myricks; 1977: Tommy Haynes; 1978: Charlton Ehizuelen (NGR), Vesco Bradley (2nd); 1979: Larry Myricks |
| 1980–1992 The Athletics Congress | 1980: Larry Myricks; 1981: Larry Myricks; 1982: Carl Lewis; 1983: Carl Lewis; 1984: Carl Lewis; 1985: Mike Conley Sr.; 1986: Mike Conley Sr.; 1987: Brian Cooper; 1988: Larry Myricks; 1989: Larry Myricks; 1990: Larry Myricks; 1991: Llewellyn Starks; 1992: Carl Lewis |
| 1993–present USA Track & Field | 1993: Obinna Eregbu (NGR), Joe Greene (3rd); 1994: Kareem Streete-Thompson; 1995: Joe Greene; 1996: Erick Walder; 1997: Erick Walder; 1998: Roland McGhee; 1999: Kareem Streete-Thompson; 2000: Savanté Stringfellow; 2001: Dwight Phillips; 2002: Miguel Pate; 2003: Miguel Pate; 2004: Savanté Stringfellow; 2005: Brian Johnson; 2006: Brian Johnson; 2007: Trevell Quinley; 2008: Trevell Quinley; 2009: Randall Flimmons; 2010: Jeremy Hicks; 2011: Jeremy Hicks; 2012: Ashton Eaton; 2013: Jeremy Hicks; 2014: Tyron Stewart; 2015: Will Claye; 2016: Marquis Dendy; 2017: La'Derrick Ward; 2018: Jarrion Lawson; 2019: Jordan Downs; 2020: KeAndre Bates; 2022: Jarrion Lawson; 2023: Will Williams; 2024: Johnny Brackins |
| Notes | * Standing long jump was held 1931 and earlier. Long jump has been held since 1932. |

==== Triple jump (standing triple jump) ====
USA Indoor Track and Field Championships winners in men's triple jump (standing triple jump)
| Standing triple jump | 1906: Martin Sheridan; 1907: Ray Ewry; 1908: Samuel Lawrence; 1909: Ray Ewry; 1910: Daniel Healy |
| Triple jump | 1906: James O'Connell; 1907: Platt Adams; 1908: Platt Adams; 1909: Dan Ahearn; 1910: Dan Ahearn; 1911: Matthew Fahey; 1913: Dan Ahearn; 1916: Dan Ahearn; 1967: Art Walker; 1968: Charles Craig; 1969: Norman Tate; 1970: Norman Tate; 1971: Dave Smith; 1972: John Craft; 1973: John Craft; 1974: Milan Tiff; 1975: Tommy Haynes; 1976: Tommy Haynes; 1977: Tommy Haynes; 1978: Ron Livers; 1979: Ron Livers; 1980: Ron Livers; 1981: Mike Marlow; 1982: Keith Connor (GBR), Robert Cannon (2nd); 1983: Ajayi Agbebaku (NGR), Mike Conley Sr. (2nd); 1984: Ajayi Agbebaku (NGR), Mike Conley Sr. (2nd); 1985: Mike Conley Sr.; 1986: Mike Conley Sr.; 1987: Mike Conley Sr.; 1988: Ray Kimble; 1989: Mike Conley Sr.; 1990: Kenny Harrison; 1991: Frank Rutherford (BAH), Charles Simpkins (2nd); 1992: Mike Conley Sr.; 1993: Tyrone Scott; 1994: Tyrone Scott; 1995: Kenny Harrison; 1996: LaMark Carter; 1997: LaMark Carter; 1998: Von Ware; 1999: LaMark Carter; 2000: LeVar Anderson; 2001: LaMark Carter; 2002: Timothy Rusan; 2003: Timothy Rusan; 2004: Allen Simms; 2005: Walter Davis; 2006: Walter Davis; 2007: Aarik Wilson; 2008: Aarik Wilson; 2009: Brandon Roulhac; 2010: Lawrence Willis; 2011: Rafeeq Curry; 2012: Will Claye; 2013: Joshua Honeycutt; 2014: Chris Carter; 2015: Omar Craddock; 2016: Chris Carter; 2017: Chris Carter; 2018: Will Claye; 2019: Donald Scott; 2020: Donald Scott; 2022: Donald Scott; 2023: Donald Scott; 2024: Chris Carter |
| Notes | * From 1906 to 1979, events were conducted by the Amateur Athletic Union. Events from 1980 to 1992 were conducted under The Athletics Congress. Events thereafter were conducted by USA Track & Field. |

==== Pole vault (pole vault for distance) ====
USA Indoor Track and Field Championships winners in men's pole vault (pole vault for distance)
| Pole vault for distance | 1906: Martin Sheridan; 1907: Martin Sheridan; 1908: Willard McLeod; 1909: Harry Babcock; 1910: Platt Adams; 1911: Harry Babcock; 1913: Platt Adams; 1914: Platt Adams; 1915: Platt Adams |
| Pole vault | 1906: Alfred Carlton Gilbert; 1907: Claude Allen; 1908: Charles Vezin Jr.; 1909: William Happeny (CAN), Harry Babcock (2nd); 1910: William Happeny (CAN), Theodore Babcock (2nd); 1911: Gordon Dukes; 1925: Paul Jones; 1926: Charles Hoff (NOR), Edwin Myers (2nd); 1927: Sabin Carr; 1928: Sabin Carr; 1929: Fred Sturdy; 1930: Fred Sturdy; 1931: Fred Sturdy; 1932: Fred Sturdy; 1933: Keith Brown, Frank Pierce; 1934: Bill Graber; 1935: Ray Lowry, Eldon Stutzman, Oscar Sutermeister; 1936: David Hunn; 1937: Earle Meadows; 1938: Richard Ganslen; 1939: Cornelius Warmerdam; 1940: Earle Meadows; 1941: Earle Meadows; 1942: Boo Morcom; 1943: Cornelius Warmerdam; 1944: Jack DeField; 1945: Bill Moore; 1946: Bill Moore; 1947: Guinn Smith; 1948: Bob Richards; 1949: Boo Morcom; 1950: Bob Richards; 1951: Bob Richards; 1952: Bob Richards; 1953: Bob Richards; 1954: Jerry Welbourn; 1955: Bob Richards; 1956: Don Bragg, Bob Richards; 1957: Bob Richards; 1958: Don Bragg, Bob Gutowski; 1959: Don Bragg; 1960: Don Bragg; 1961: Don Bragg; 1962: Henry Wadsworth; 1963: Dave Tork; 1964: John Uelses; 1965: Billy Gene Pemelton; 1966: Bob Seagren; 1967: Bob Seagren; 1968: Dennis Phillips; 1969: Peter Chen; 1970: Bob Seagren; 1971: Dick Railsback; 1972: Kjell Isaksson (SWE), Steve Smith (3rd); 1973: Steve Smith; 1974: Vic Dias; 1975: Roland Carter; 1976: Roland Carter; 1977: Larry Jessee; 1978: Larry Jessee; 1979: Dan Ripley; 1980: Earl Bell; 1981: Thierry Vigneron (FRA), Dan Ripley (3rd); 1982: Billy Olson; 1983: Billy Olson; 1984: Sergey Bubka (URS), Earl Bell (3rd); 1985: Doug Lytle; 1986: Sergey Bubka (URS), Brad Pursley (5th); 1987: Earl Bell; 1988: Radion Gataullin (URS), Dave Kenworthy (2nd); 1989: Radion Gataullin (URS), Billy Olson (2nd); 1990: István Bagyula (HUN), Tim Bright (2nd); 1991: Kory Tarpenning; 1992: Dean Starkey; 1993: Greg West; 1994: Kory Tarpenning; 1995: Nick Hysong; 1996: Pat Manson; 1997: Lawrence Johnson; 1998: Scott Hennig; 1999: Jeff Hartwig; 2000: Lawrence Johnson; 2001: Lawrence Johnson; 2002: Timothy Mack; 2003: Derek Miles; 2004: Toby Stevenson; 2005: Brad Walker; 2006: Brad Walker; 2007: Jeff Hartwig; 2008: Brad Walker; 2009: Jeremy Scott; 2010: Timothy Mack; 2011: Mark Hollis; 2012: Brad Walker; 2013: Jordan Scott; 2014: Mark Hollis; 2015: Sam Kendricks; 2016: Sam Kendricks; 2017: Sam Kendricks; 2018: Scott Houston; 2019: Andrew Irwin; 2020: Matt Ludwig; 2022: Chris Nilsen; 2023: Sam Kendricks; 2024: Chris Nilsen |
| Notes | * From 1906 to 1979, events were conducted by the Amateur Athletic Union. Events from 1980 to 1992 were conducted under The Athletics Congress. Events thereafter were conducted by USA Track & Field. |

==== Shot put ====
USA Indoor Track and Field Championships winners in men's shot put (8 lb, 12 lb, 16 lb, 24 lb)
| 8-lb shot put | 1906: Martin Sheridan; 1907: Wesley Coe; 1908: Martin Sheridan |
| 12-lb shot put | 1910: Russell Lawrence; 1911: Russell Beatty |
| 16-lb shot put | 1916: Pat McDonald; 1917: Pat McDonald; 1918: Douglas Sinclair; 1919: Pat McDonald; 1920: Pat McDonald; 1921: Pat McDonald; 1922: Ralph Hills; 1923: Gus Pope; 1924: Ralph Hills; 1925: Douglas Sinclair; 1926: Herb Schwarze; 1927: Herb Schwarze; 1928: Herb Schwarze; 1929: Herb Schwarze; 1930: Bruce Bennett; 1931: Leo Sexton; 1932: Bruce Bennett; 1933: Leo Sexton; 1934: Thomas Gilbane; 1935: Jack Torrance; 1936: Dimitri Zaitz; 1937: Dimitri Zaitz; 1938: Frank Ryan; 1939: Frank Ryan; 1940: Al Blozis; 1941: Al Blozis; 1942: Al Blozis; 1943: Bernie Mayer; 1944: John Yonakor; 1945: Wilfred Bangert; 1946: Bernie Mayer; 1947: Irving Kintisch; 1948: Norman Wasser; 1949: Wilbur Thompson; 1950: Jim Fuchs; 1951: Jim Fuchs; 1952: Jim Fuchs; 1953: Parry O'Brien; 1954: Parry O'Brien; 1955: Parry O'Brien; 1956: Parry O'Brien; 1957: Parry O'Brien; 1958: Parry O'Brien; 1959: Parry O'Brien; 1960: Parry O'Brien; 1961: Parry O'Brien; 1962: Gary Gubner; 1963: Gary Gubner; 1964: Gary Gubner; 1965: John McGrath; 1966: John McGrath; 1967: George Woods; 1968: George Woods; 1969: George Woods; 1970: Brian Oldfield; 1971: Al Feuerbach; 1972: Fred DeBernardi; 1973: George Woods; 1974: Terry Albritton; 1975: Al Feuerbach; 1976: Terry Albritton; 1977: Mac Wilkins; 1978: Al Feuerbach; 1979: Colin Anderson; 1980: Jesse Stuart; 1981: Brian Oldfield; 1982: Jeff Braun; 1983: Kevin Akins; 1984: Augie Wolf; 1985: Scott Lofquist; 1986: Gregg Tafralis; 1987: Ulf Timmermann (GDR), Ron Backes (3rd); 1988: Ron Backes; 1989: Randy Barnes; 1990: Randy Barnes; 1991: Ron Backes; 1992: Ron Backes; 1993: Jim Doehring; 1994: Kevin Toth; 1995: C. J. Hunter; 1996: John Godina; 1997: John Godina; 1998: John Godina; 1999: Andy Bloom; 2000: Andy Bloom; 2001: Adam Nelson; 2002: Adam Nelson; 2003: Kevin Toth; 2004: Christian Cantwell; 2005: John Godina; 2006: Reese Hoffa; 2007: Christian Cantwell; 2008: Christian Cantwell; 2009: Dan Taylor; 2010: Christian Cantwell; 2011: Ryan Whiting; 2012: Reese Hoffa; 2013: Ryan Whiting; 2014: Ryan Whiting; 2015: Christian Cantwell; 2016: Kurt Roberts; 2017: Darien Moore; 2018: Ryan Whiting; 2019: Ryan Crouser; 2020: Ryan Crouser; 2022: Ryan Crouser; 2023: Joe Kovacs; 2024: Ryan Crouser |
| 24-lb shot put | 1906: Martin Sheridan; 1907: Wesley Coe; 1908: Wesley Coe; 1909: Pat McDonald; 1910: Pat McDonald; 1913: Pat McDonald; 1914: Pat McDonald; 1915: Pat McDonald |
| Notes | * From 1906 to 1979, events were conducted by the Amateur Athletic Union. Events from 1980 to 1992 were conducted under The Athletics Congress. Events thereafter were conducted by USA Track & Field. |

==== Weight throw (weight throw for height) ====
USA Indoor Track and Field Championships winners in men's 35-lb weight throw (56-lb weight throw for height)
| 56 lb weight throw for height | 1906: Martin Sheridan; 1907: Matt McGrath; 1908: Pat McDonald; 1909: Matt McGrath; 1910: Con Walsh (CAN), Matt McGrath (2nd); 1911: Matt McGrath; 1913: Pat McDonald; 1914: Pat McDonald; 1915: Matt McGrath |
| 35 lb weight throw | 1932: Leo Sexton; 1933: Mort Reznick; 1934: Henry Dreyer; 1935: Henry Dreyer; 1936: Irving Folwartshny; 1937: Irving Folwartshny; 1938: Irving Folwartshny; 1939: Henry Dreyer; 1940: Niles Perkins; 1941: Henry Dreyer; 1942: Henry Dreyer; 1943: Henry Dreyer; 1944: Henry Dreyer; 1945: Henry Dreyer; 1946: Henry Dreyer; 1947: Henry Dreyer; 1948: Robert Bennett; 1949: Samuel Felton; 1950: Gil Borjeson; 1951: Thomas Bane; 1952: Gil Borjeson; 1953: Steve Dillon; 1954: Bob Backus; 1955: Bob Backus; 1956: Bob Backus; 1957: Bob Backus; 1958: Bob Backus; 1959: Bob Backus; 1960: Hal Connolly; 1961: Bob Backus; 1962: Albert Hall; 1963: Albert Hall; 1964: Albert Hall; 1965: Hal Connolly; 1966: Hal Connolly; 1967: Ed Burke; 1968: Ed Burke; 1969: Albert Hall; 1970: George Frenn; 1971: George Frenn; 1972: George Frenn; 1973: George Frenn; 1974: Jacques Accambray (FRA), George Frenn (2nd); 1975: George Frenn; 1976: Larry Hart; 1977: George Frenn; 1978: Ed Kania; 1979: Ed Kania; 1980: Ed Kania; 1981: Ed Kania; 1982: Ed Kania; 1983: Robert Weir (GBR), Ed Kania (2nd); 1984: Jud Logan; 1985: Jud Logan; 1986: Jud Logan; 1987: Lance Deal; 1988: Walter Ciofani (FRA), Pat Egan (3rd); 1989: Lance Deal; 1990: Lance Deal; 1991: Lance Deal; 1992: Lance Deal; 1993: Lance Deal; 1994: Lance Deal; 1995: Lance Deal; 1996: Lance Deal; 1997: Jud Logan; 1998: Lance Deal; 1999: Lance Deal; 2000: Lance Deal; 2001: John McEwen; 2002: John McEwen; 2003: Alfred Kruger; 2004: James Parker; 2005: Alfred Kruger; 2006: Alfred Kruger; 2007: Alfred Kruger; 2008: Kibwé Johnson; 2009: Jake Freeman; 2010: Alfred Kruger; 2011: Jake Freeman; 2012: Alfred Kruger; 2013: Jake Freeman; 2014: Alfred Kruger; 2015: Alfred Kruger; 2016: Colin Dunbar; 2017: Alex Young; 2018: Conor McCullough; 2019: Daniel Haugh; 2020: Conor McCullough; 2022: Alex Young; 2023: Daniel Haugh; 2024: Daniel Haugh |
| Notes | * From 1906 to 1979, events were conducted by the Amateur Athletic Union. Events from 1980 to 1992 were conducted under The Athletics Congress. Events thereafter were conducted by USA Track & Field. |

==== Heptathlon ====
USA Indoor Track and Field Championships winners in men's heptathlon
- 1995: Sheldon Blockburger
- 1996: Steve Fritz
- 1997: Ricky Barker
- 1998: Ricky Barker
- 1999: Trafton Rodgers
- 2000: Tom Pappas
- 2001: Stephen Moore
- 2002: Tom Pappas
- 2003: Paul Terek
- 2004: Paul Terek
- 2005: Ryan Harlan
- 2006: Ryan Harlan
- 2007: Paul Terek
- 2008: Jake Arnold
- 2009: Jake Arnold
- 2010: Jake Arnold
- 2011: Nick Adcock
- 2012: Eric Broadbent
- 2013: Gunnar Nixon
- 2014: Gray Horn
- 2015: Jeremy Taiwo
- 2016: Curtis Beach
- 2017: Japheth Cato
- 2018: Jeremy Taiwo
- 2019: Tim Ehrhardt
- 2020: Garrett Scantling
- 2022: Garrett Scantling
- 2023: Steve Bastien
- 2024: Steve Bastien

=== Discontinued events ===
==== 75 yards ====
In 1913, 1914, and 1915, the 75 yards was the only short sprint distance held. In other years, the 60 yards was held as a separate event in addition.

- 1906: Charles Seitz
- 1907: Charles Seitz
- 1908: Robert Cloughen
- 1909: William Keating
- 1910: Robert Cloughen
- 1911: Alvah Meyer
- 1913: Howard Drew
- 1914: Alvah Meyer
- 1915: Irvin Howe

==== 150 yards ====
- 1906: Lawson Robertson
- 1907: Frank Lukeman (CAN), William Keating (2nd)
- 1908: John Eller
- 1909: John Eller
- 1910: Frank Lukeman (CAN), John Eller (2nd)

==== 200 m ====
- 1994: Chris Nelloms
- 1995: Tod Long
- 1996: Kevin Little
- 1997: Rohsaan Griffin
- 1998: Ramon Clay
- 1999: Rohsaan Griffin
- 2000: Chris Chandler
- 2001: Coby Miller
- 2002: Shawn Crawford
- 2003: John Capel Jr.
- 2004: Jimmie Hackley

==== 5 miles ====
- 1906: George Bonhag
- 1907: George Bonhag
- 1908: Tom Collins
- 1909: Tom Collins
- 1917: Heywood Holden
- 1918: Charles Pores

==== 220 yards hurdles ====
- 1906: John Eller
- 1907: Forrest Smithson
- 1908: John Eller
- 1909: John Eller

==== 440 yards hurdles (300 yards hurdles) ====
- 1906: Harry Hillman
- 1907: Harry Hillman
- 1908: John Eller
- 1909: John Hartranft
- 1910: William Robbins

==== 3000 m steeplechase (2 miles steeplechase) ====
Distance was 2 miles except for 1933-1939. All events were run 'dry' with no water jump.

- 1925: Ville Ritola (FIN), Russell Payne (2nd)
- 1926: Emil Krogh
- 1927: Ove Anderson (FIN), Russell Payne (2nd)
- 1928: William Spencer
- 1929: Eino Purje (FIN), Franklin Osgood (3rd)
- 1930: Hans Assert
- 1931: Hans Assert
- 1932: Joe McCluskey
- 1933: Joe McCluskey
- 1934: Joe McCluskey
- 1935: Joe McCluskey
- 1936: Joe McCluskey
- 1937: Tom Deckard
- 1938: Joe McCluskey
- 1939: Tom Deckard
- 1940: Joe McCluskey
- 1941: Joe McCluskey

==== Discus throw ====
- 1909: Wesley Coe
