= 1939 USA Indoor Track and Field Championships =

National athletics championship event

- Dates: February 25 (men)
- Host city: New York City, New York, United States (men)
- Venue: Madison Square Garden (men)
- Level: Senior
- Type: Indoor
- Events: 13 (13 men's + 0 women's)

The 1939 USA Indoor Track and Field Championships were organized by the Amateur Athletic Union (AAU) and served as the national championships in indoor track and field for the United States.

The men's edition was held at Madison Square Garden in New York City, New York, and it took place February 25. There was no corresponding women's meet in 1939.

The 1939 championships ended the U.S. experimentation with the metric system, with all future indoor events expected to use imperial distances. Because of this, the championship records in many events from this edition would stand until the return to metric system at the 1987 USA Indoor Track and Field Championships.

== Medal summary ==
=== Men ===
Event	Gold		Silver	Bronze
60 m	Herbert Thompson	6.6		
600 m	Charlie Beetham	1:21.6		
1000 m	John Borican	2:28.6		
1500 m	Glenn Cunningham	3:54.6		
5000 m	Don Lash	14:30.9		
65 m hurdles	Allan Tolmich	8.4		
3000 m steeplechase (Note: Run without a water jump.)	Thomas Deckard	8:49.4	Joseph McCluskey	George De George
High jump	Mel Walker	2.03 m		
Pole vault	Cornelius "Dutch" Warmerdam	4.27 m		
Long jump	Ed Gordon	7.26 m		
Shot put	Frank Ryan	15.52 m		
Weight throw	Henry Dreyer	16.59 m		
1500 m walk	Otto Kotraba	6:23.0		
