= 1921 USA Indoor Track and Field Championships =

National athletics championship event

- Dates: March 19
- Host city: New York City, New York, United States
- Venue: 22nd Regiment Armory
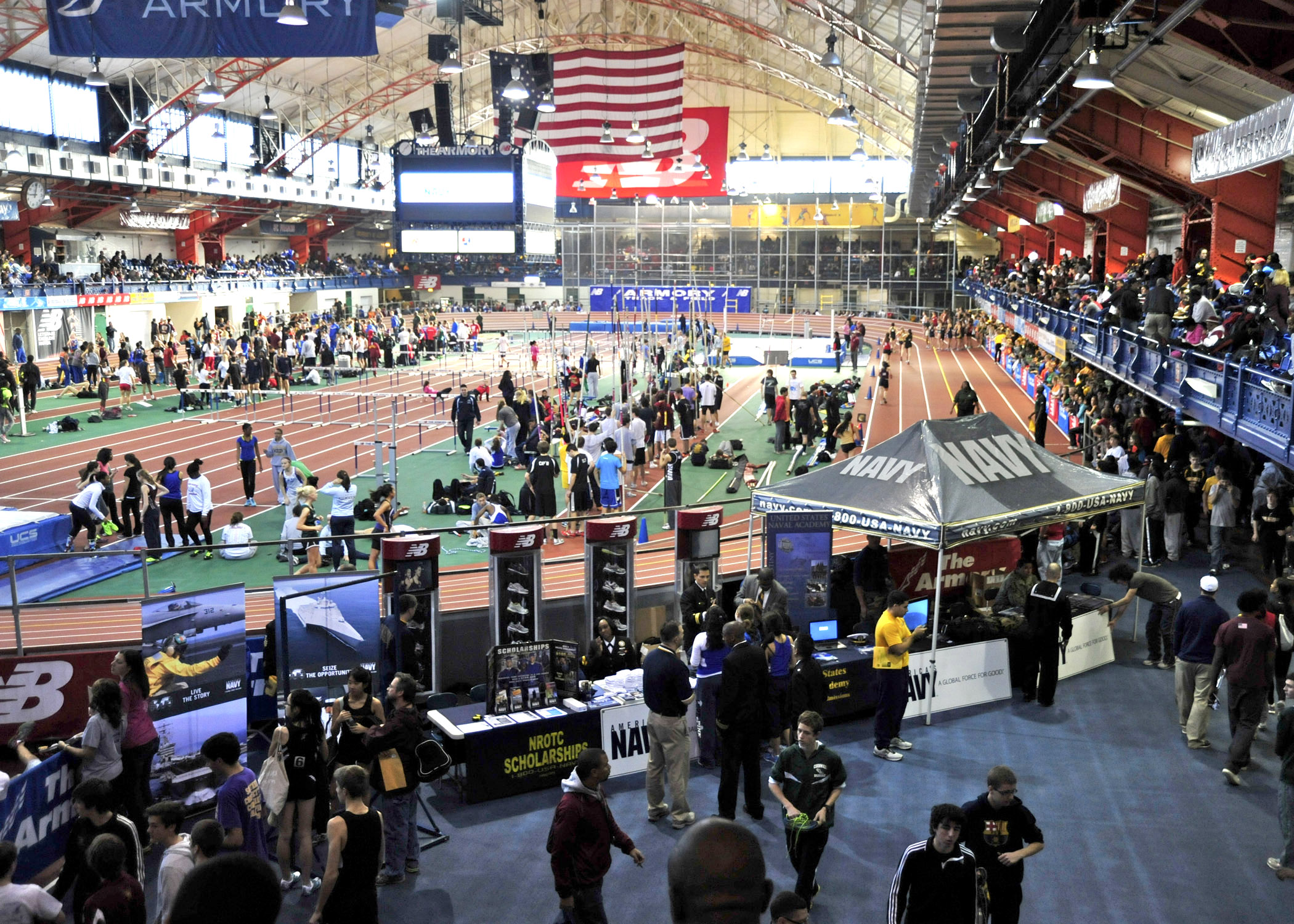
- Level: Senior
- Type: Indoor
- Events: 11

The 1921 USA Indoor Track and Field Championships were organized by the Amateur Athletic Union (AAU) and served as the national championships in indoor track and field for the United States.

The men's championships were held at the 22nd Regiment Armory in New York City, New York, and they took place March 19. Women's championships were not officially held until 1927.

At the championships, Richard Remer set a championship record in the 1 mile walk, finishing just one second behind the American record.

== Medal summary ==
=== Men ===
Event	Gold		Silver	Bronze
60 yards	Ward Conway	6.6		
300 yards	James O'Brien	32.8		
600 yards	Fred Murrey	1:15.6		
1000 yards	Sid Leslie	2:15.4		
2 miles	Max Bohland	9:45.2		
70 yards hurdles	Harold Barron	9.4		
High jump	Richmond Landon	1.85 m		
Standing high jump	Ed Emes	5 ft 2 in (1.57 m)		
Standing long jump	Irving Reed	3.25 m		
Shot put	Patrick McDonald	14.11 m		
1 mile walk	Richard Remer	6:29.0		
