= 1914 USA Indoor Track and Field Championships =

National athletics championship event

- Dates: March 2
- Host city: New York City, New York, United States
- Venue: 22nd Regiment Armory
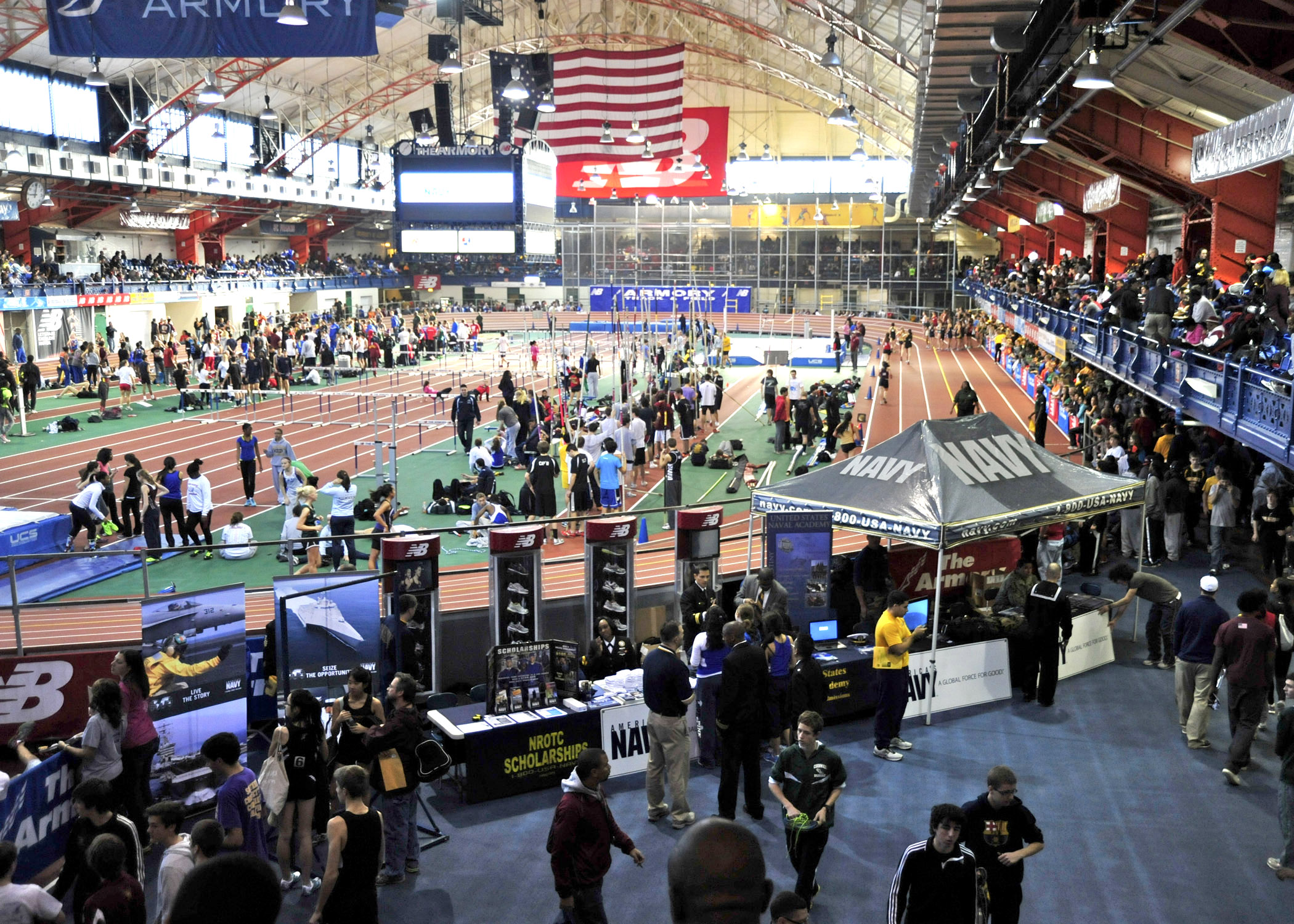
- Level: Senior
- Type: Indoor
- Events: 9

The 1914 USA Indoor Track and Field Championships were organized by the Amateur Athletic Union (AAU) and served as the national championships in indoor track and field for the United States.

The men's championships were held at the 22nd Regiment Armory in New York City, New York, and they took place March 2. Women's championships were not officially held until 1927.

Two world records and five championship records were set. The Irish American Athletic Club won the team competition.

== Medal summary ==
=== Men ===
Event	Gold		Silver	Bronze
75 yards	Alvah Meyer	7.6		
300 yards	Alvah Meyer	32.2		
600 yards	Thomas Halpin	1:13.4		
1000 yards	Abel Kiviat	2:15.4		
2 miles	Harry Smith	9:18.0		
70 yards hurdles	John Eller	9.4		
High jump	Eugene Jennings	1.85 m		
Standing long jump	Platt Adams	3.32 m		
Pole vault for distance	Platt Adams	28 ft 0 1/2 in (8.54 m)		
Shot put (Note: Implement was 24 pounds (11 kg))	Pat McDonald	37 ft 7 in (11.45 m)		
Weight throw for height	Pat McDonald	15 ft 9 in (4.8 m)		
2 miles walk	Richard Remer	14:21.8		
