= Edward Garvey =

Edward Garvey may refer to:

- Edward B. Garvey (1914–1999), U.S. hiker and author
- Ed Garvey (1940–2017), U.S. politician
- Edward Garvey (runner), winner of the 2 miles at the 1918 USA Indoor Track and Field Championships

== See also ==
- Dan Edward Garvey (1886–1974)
