= 1915 USA Indoor Track and Field Championships =

National athletics championship event

- Dates: March 4
- Host city: New York City, New York, United States
- Venue: 22nd Regiment Armory
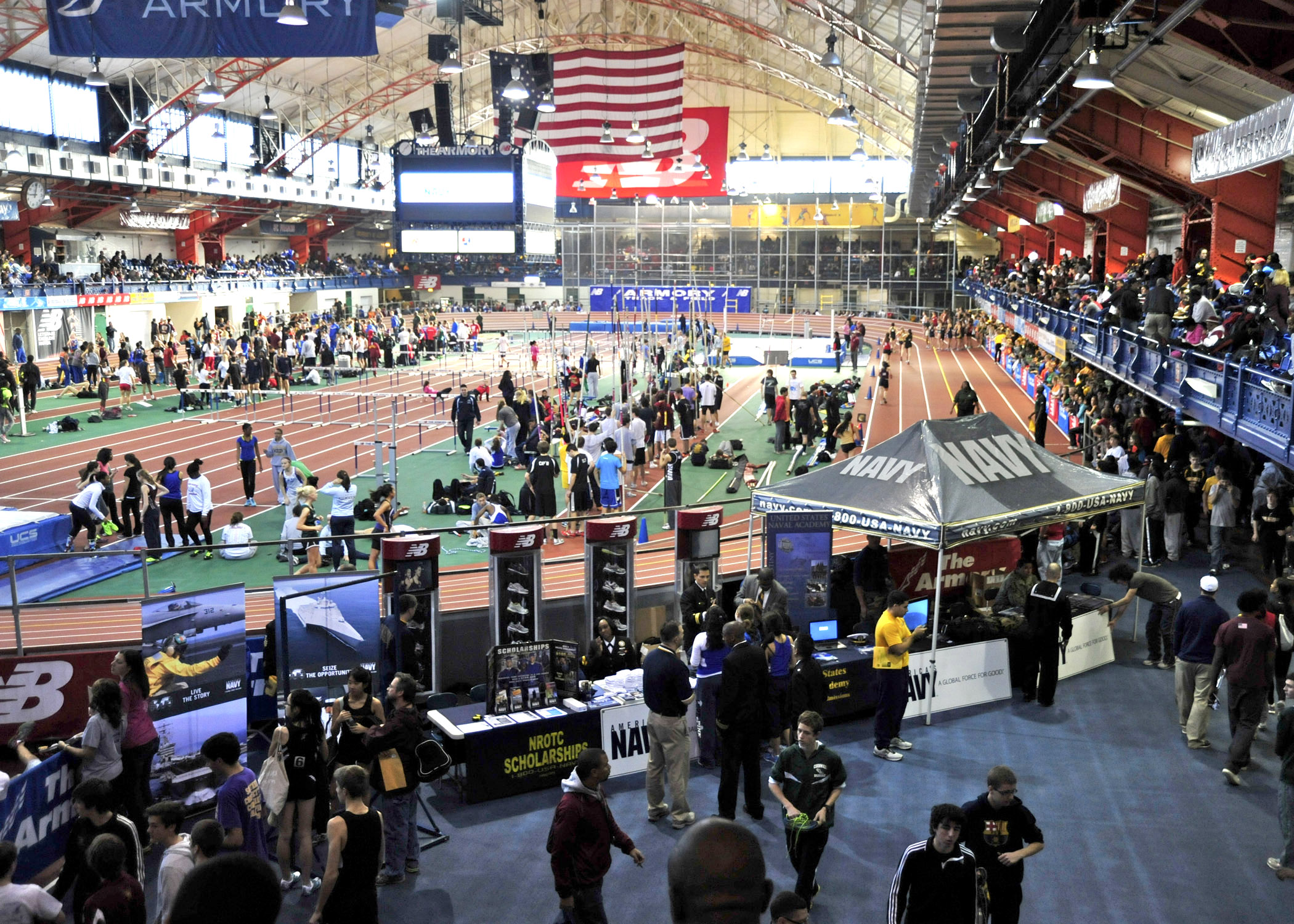
- Level: Senior
- Type: Indoor
- Events: 9

The 1915 USA Indoor Track and Field Championships were organized by the Amateur Athletic Union (AAU) and served as the national championships in indoor track and field for the United States.

The men's championships were held at the 22nd Regiment Armory in New York City, New York, and they took place March 4. Women's championships were not officially held until 1927.

The Irish American Athletic Club led in scoring, though athletes representing Boston won two events at the start of the championships.

== Medal summary ==
=== Men ===
| Event | Gold | | Silver | Bronze |
|---|---|---|---|---|
| 75 yards | Irvin Howe | 7.8 | | |
| 300 yards | Stanley Rose | 32.6 | | |
| 600 yards | Thomas Halpin | 1:14.8 | | |
| 1000 yards | Dave Caldwell | 2:18.8 | | |
| 2 miles | Mike Devaney | 9:24.8 | | |
| 70 yards hurdles | Derrill Trenholm | 9.4 | | |
| High jump | Wesley Oler | 1.89 m | | |
| Standing high jump | William Taylor | 5.04 m | | |
| Standing long jump | William Taylor | 3.40 m | | |
| Pole vault for distance | Platt Adams | 26 ft 7 1/4 in (8.1 m) | | |
| Shot put (Note: Implement was 24 pounds (11 kg)) | Pat McDonald | 38 ft 5 in (11.7 m) | | |
| Weight throw for height | Matthew McGrath | 15 ft 9 in (4.8 m) | | |
| 2 miles walk | Edward Renz | 14:05.6 | | |
