= 1940 USA Indoor Track and Field Championships =

National athletics championship event

- Dates: February 24 (men)
- Host city: New York City, New York, United States (men)
- Venue: Madison Square Garden (men)
- Level: Senior
- Type: Indoor
- Events: 14 (14 men's + 0 women's)

The 1940 USA Indoor Track and Field Championships were organized by the Amateur Athletic Union (AAU) and served as the national championships in indoor track and field for the United States.

The men's edition was held at Madison Square Garden in New York City, New York, and it took place February 24. There was no corresponding women's championships in 1940.

At the championships, the University of Notre Dame's Greg Rice ran a world record time of 13:55.9 for 3 miles indoors. He ran the race minutes after Taisto Mäki raced in an exhibition at the same venue, and commentators viewed Rice's performance as a response to Finnish distance running dominance of the time. About 15,000 spectators attended.

== Medal summary ==
=== Men ===
Event	Gold		Silver	Bronze
60 yards	Mozelle Ellerbe	6.2		
600 yards	Charles Belcher	1:11.6		
1000 yards	John Borican	2:13.0		
Mile run	Charles Fenske	4:08.8		
3 miles	Greg Rice	13:55.9		
70 yards hurdles	Allan Tolmich	8.4		
2 miles steeplechase (Note: Run without a water jump.)	Joe McCluskey	10:03.4		
High jump	Arthur Byrnes	1.94 m		
Pole vault	Earle Meadows	4.35 m		
Long jump	Anson Perina	7.21 m		
Shot put	Al Blozis	16.98 m		
Weight throw	Niles Perkins	17.08 m		
1 mile walk	Charles Eschenbach	6:51.7		
