= 1919 USA Indoor Track and Field Championships =

National athletics championship event

- Dates: March 8
- Host city: Brooklyn, New York, United States
- Venue: 13th Regiment Armory
- Level: Senior
- Type: Indoor
- Events: 11

The 1919 USA Indoor Track and Field Championships were organized by the Amateur Athletic Union (AAU) and served as the national championships in indoor track and field for the United States.

The men's championships were held at the 13th Regiment Armory in Brooklyn, New York, and they took place March 8. Women's championships were not officially held until 1927.

At the championships, the "tiny speed marvel" Joie Ray won the 1000 yards by ten yards. The meet was so popular that thousands of late fans besieged the entry doors and were not able to attend.

== Medal summary ==
=== Men ===
Event	Gold		Silver	Bronze
60 yards	Loren Murchison	6.6		
300 yards	Loren Murchison	32.4		
600 yards	Jack Sellers	1:15.6		
1000 yards	Joie Ray	2:16.4		
2 miles	Gordon Nightingale	9:28.4		
70 yards hurdles	Walker Smith	9.4		
High jump	Walter Whalen	1.83 m		
Standing high jump	William Taylor	5 ft 4 1/2 in (1.63 m)		
Standing long jump	William Taylor	3.19 m		
Shot put	Patrick McDonald	13.59 m		
2 miles walk	Edward Renz	14:33.4		
