= 1926 USA Indoor Track and Field Championships =

American athletics event in Illinois

- Dates: March 8
- Host city: Chicago, Illinois, United States
- Venue: Chicago Riding Club
- Level: Senior
- Type: Indoor
- Events: 13

The 1926 USA Indoor Track and Field Championships were organized by the Amateur Athletic Union (AAU) and served as the national championships in indoor track and field for the United States.

The men's championships were held at the Chicago Riding Club in Chicago, Illinois, and it took place March 8. Women's championships were not officially held until 1927.

At the championships, Charlie Hoff and Herbert Schwarze broke world records in the pole vault and shot put.

== Medal summary ==
=== Men ===
Event	Gold		Silver		Bronze
60 yards	Chester Bowman	6.2			
300 yards	Manny Lochnicht	32.4			
600 yards	Horatio Fitch	1:14.0			
1000 yards	Ray Dodge	2:15.2			
2 miles	William Goodwin	9:25.4			
70 yards hurdles	George Guthrie	8.6			
2 miles steeplechase	Emil Krogh	10:41 2/5			
High jump	Harold Osborn	1.95 m			
Standing high jump	Hans Hedberg	4 ft 10 in (1.47 m)			
Pole vault	Charles Hoff (NOR)	4.13 m	Edwin Myers	12 ft 6 in (3.81 m)	
Standing long jump	Harold Osborn	3.22 m			
Shot put	Herb Schwarze	15.43 m			
1 mile walk	Harry Hinkel	7:03.4			
