= 1922 USA Indoor Track and Field Championships =

American athletics event in New York

- Dates: February 11
- Host city: Buffalo, New York, United States
- Venue: 74th Regiment Armory
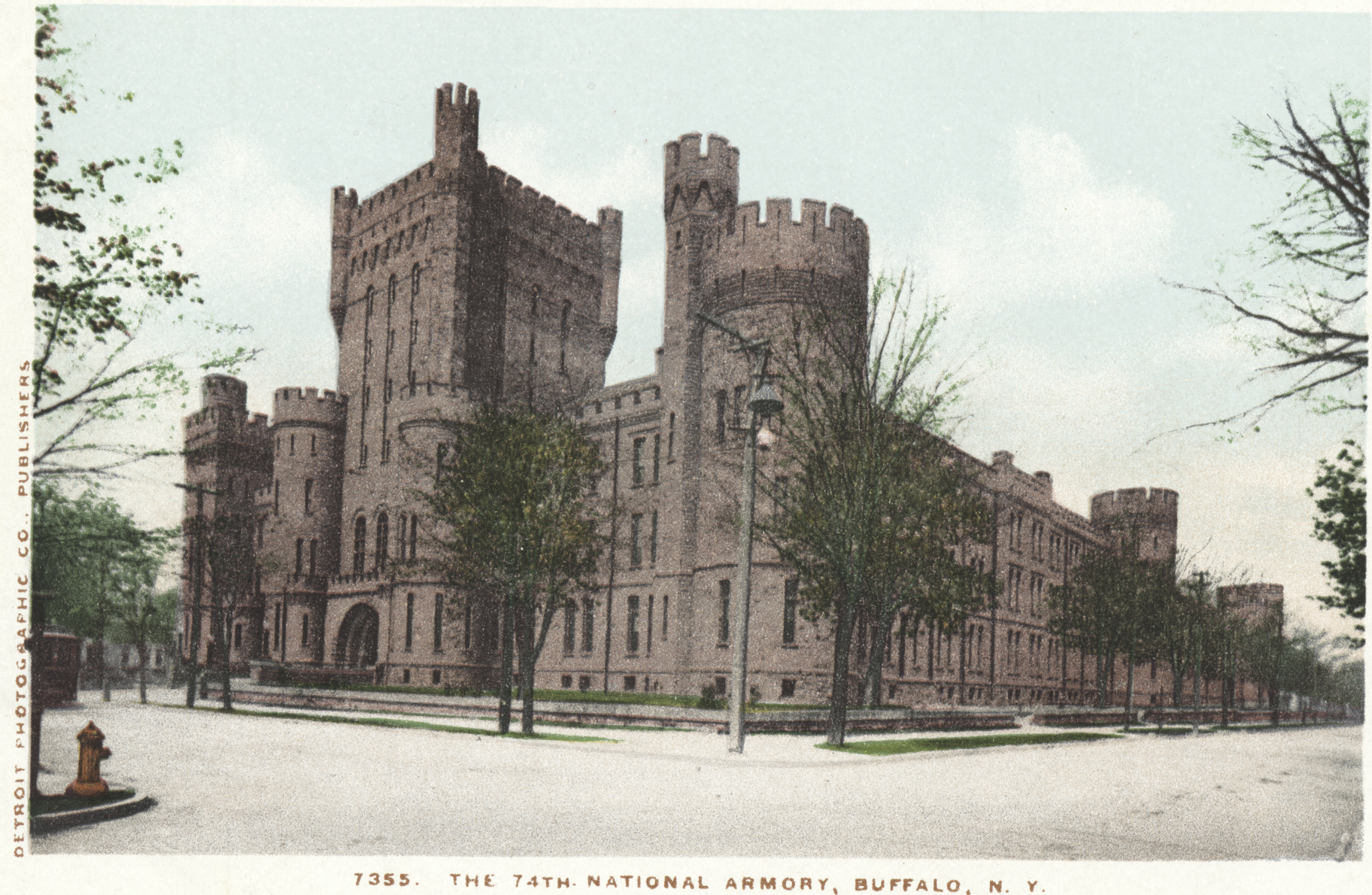
- Level: Senior
- Type: Indoor
- Events: 11

The 1922 USA Indoor Track and Field Championships were organized by the Amateur Athletic Union (AAU) and served as the national championships in indoor track and field for the United States.

The men's championships were held at the 74th Regiment Armory in Buffalo, New York, and they took place February 11. Women's championships were not officially held until 1927.

At the championships, Allen Woodring broke the world record in the 300 yards.

== Medal summary ==
=== Men ===
| Event | Gold | | Silver | Bronze |
|---|---|---|---|---|
| 60 yards | Loren Murchison | 6.4 | | |
| 300 yards | Allen Woodring | 31.2 | | |
| 600 yards | Sid Leslie | 1:14.8 | | |
| 1000 yards | Harold Cutbill | 2:13.4 | | |
| 2 miles | John Romig | 9:21.2 | | |
| 70 yards hurdles | Harold Barron | 9.2 | | |
| High jump | Leroy Brown | 1.83 m | | |
| Standing high jump | Edward Emes | 5 ft 1 in (1.54 m) | | |
| Standing long jump | Irving Reed | 3.25 m | | |
| Shot put | Ralph Hills | 14.28 m | | |
| 1 mile walk | Willie Plant | 6:40.6 | | |
