= 1920 USA Indoor Track and Field Championships =

National athletics championship event

- Dates: March 13
- Host city: New York City, New York, United States
- Venue: 22nd Regiment Armory
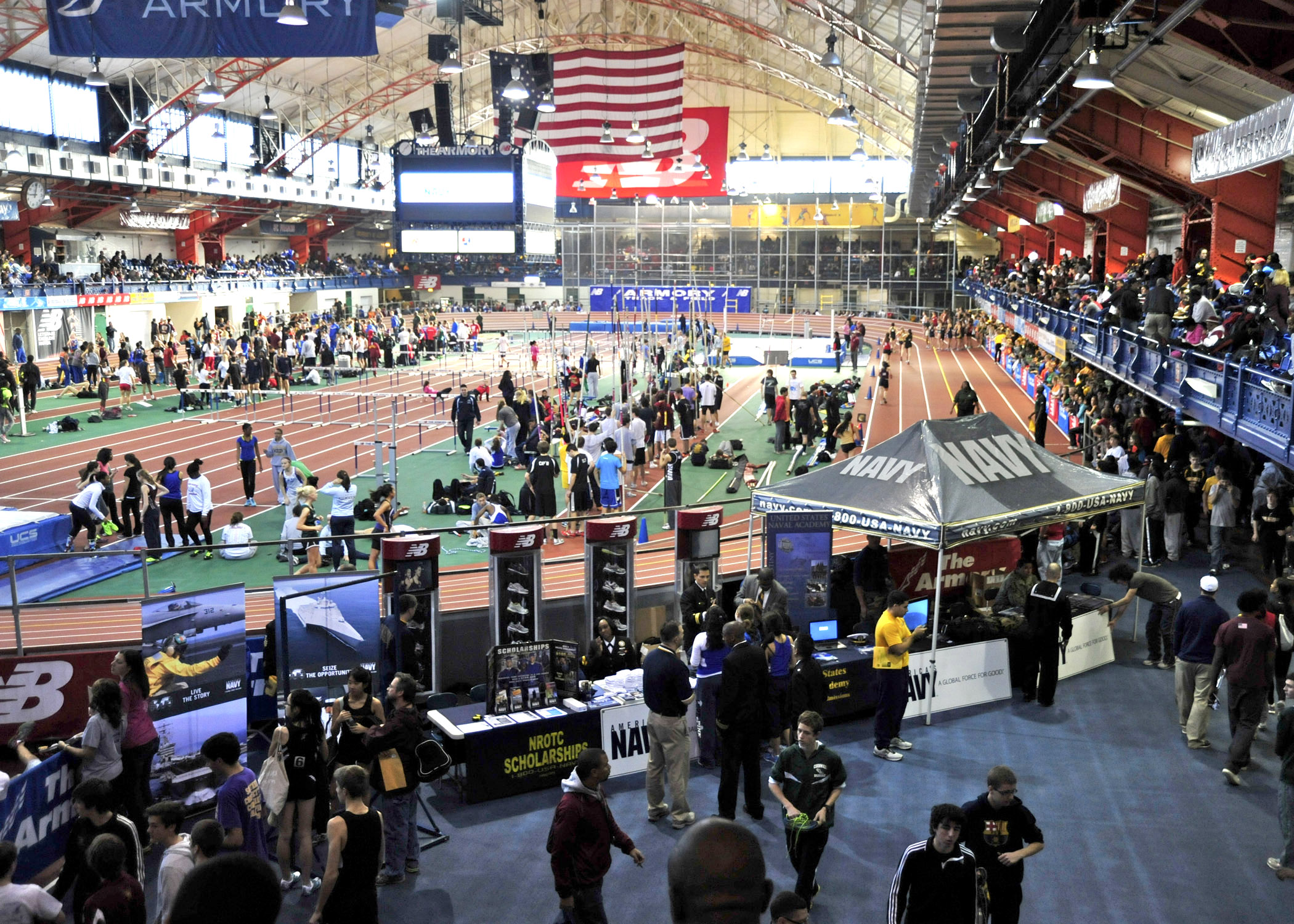
- Level: Senior
- Type: Indoor
- Events: 11

The 1920 USA Indoor Track and Field Championships were organized by the Amateur Athletic Union (AAU) and served as the national championships in indoor track and field for the United States.

The men's championships were held at the 22nd Regiment Armory in New York City, New York, and they took place March 13. Women's championships were not officially held until 1927.

At the championships, Joie Ray defended his 1000 yards title despite a late challenge from Homer Baker. A tug of war championship was also contested, won by Åland Athletic Club of New York.

== Medal summary ==
=== Men ===
| Event | Gold | | Silver | Bronze |
|---|---|---|---|---|
| 60 yards | Loren Murchison | 6.4 | | |
| 300 yards | Loren Murchison | 32.0 | | |
| 600 yards | Earl Eby | 1:16.0 | | |
| 1000 yards | Joie Ray | 2:15.2 | | |
| 2 miles | Harry Helm | 9:34.6 | | |
| 70 yards hurdles | Walker Smith | 9.2 | | |
| High jump | Walter Whalen | 1.92 m | | |
| Standing high jump | Ben Adams | 5 ft 1 in (1.54 m) | | |
| Standing long jump | Irving Reed | 3.15 m | | |
| Shot put | Patrick McDonald | 13.79 m | | |
| 1 mile walk | Joseph Pearman | 6:39.0 | | |
