= 1916 USA Indoor Track and Field Championships =

National athletics championship event

- Dates: March 18
- Host city: New York City, New York, United States
- Venue: 22nd Regiment Armory
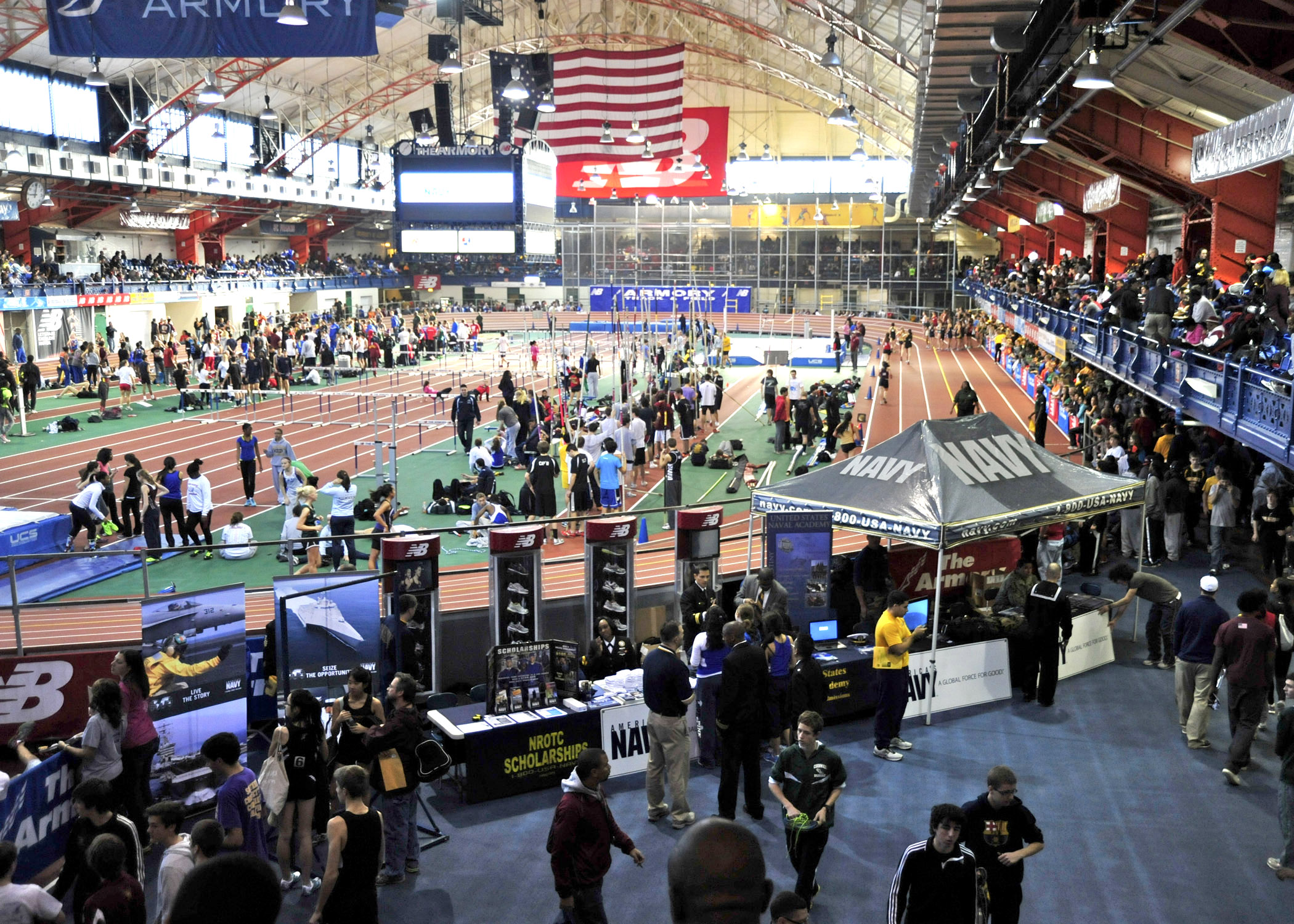
- Level: Senior
- Type: Indoor
- Events: 12

The 1916 USA Indoor Track and Field Championships were organized by the Amateur Athletic Union (AAU) and served as the national championships in indoor track and field for the United States.

The men's championships were held at the 22nd Regiment Armory in New York City, New York, and they took place March 18. Women's championships were not officially held until 1927.

The two-mile walk was considered the feature of the competition, and it was won in a new world record time of 13:37.

== Medal summary ==
=== Men ===
Event	Gold		Silver	Bronze
60 yards	Jo Loomis	6.4		
300 yards	Andrew Kelly	32.4		
600 yards	William Bingham	1:14.8		
1000 yards	John Overton	2:15.4		
2 miles	Joie Ray	9:25.8		
70 yards hurdles	John Eller	9.6		
High jump	Jo Loomis	1.85 m		
Standing high jump	William Taylor	5 ft 3 in (1.6 m)		
Standing long jump	Platt Adams	3.22 m		
Triple jump	Daniel Ahearn	46 ft 10 3/4 in (14.29 m)		
Shot put	Patrick McDonald	14.19 m		
2 miles walk	George Goulding (CAN)	13:37.0	Edward Renz	
