= 1923 USA Indoor Track and Field Championships =

American athletics event in New York

- Dates: February 17
- Host city: Buffalo, New York, United States
- Venue: Connecticut Street Armory
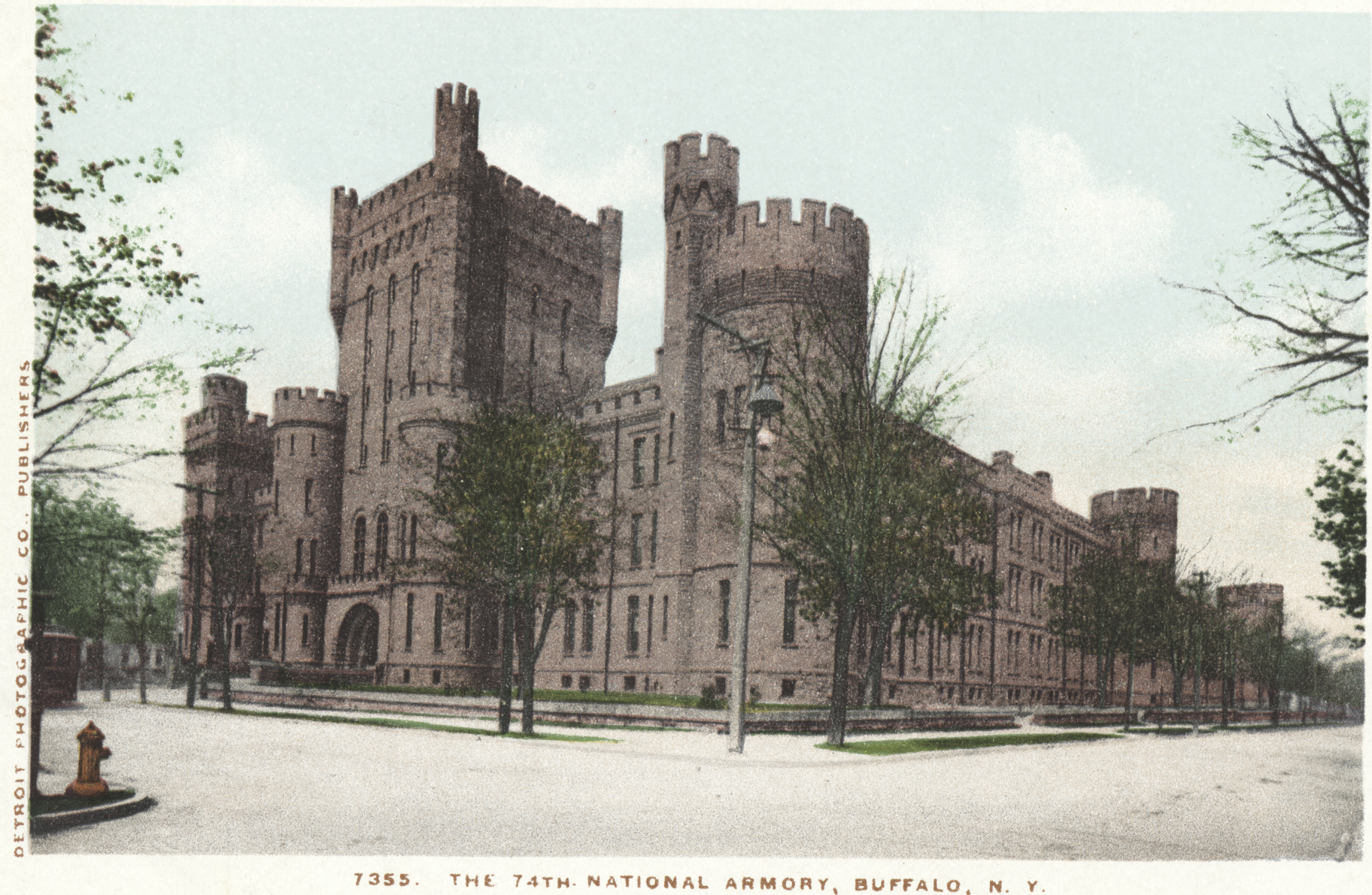
- Level: Senior
- Type: Indoor
- Events: 11

The 1923 USA Indoor Track and Field Championships were organized by the Amateur Athletic Union (AAU) and served as the national championships in indoor track and field for the United States.

The men's championships were held at the Connecticut Street Armory in Buffalo, New York, and they took place February 17. Women's championships were not officially held until 1927.

At the championships, Loren Murchison equaled his own championship record in the 60 yards.

== Medal summary ==
=== Men ===
Event	Gold		Silver	Bronze
60 yards	Loren Murchison	6.4		
300 yards	Loren Murchison	31.2		
600 yards	Earl Eby	1:14.4		
1000 yards	Ray Watson	2:15.6		
2 miles	Joie Ray	9:10.4		
70 yards hurdles	Karl Anderson	8.8		
High jump	Harold Osborn	1.93 m		
Standing high jump	Thomas Hoskins	4 ft 11 1/2 in (1.51 m)		
Standing long jump	Irving Reed	3.27 m		
Shot put	Gus Pope	13.19 m		
1 mile walk	Willie Plant	6:55.6		
