= List of USA Indoor Track and Field Championships winners =

List of USA Indoor Track and Field Championships winners may refer to:

- List of USA Indoor Track and Field Championships winners (men)
- List of USA Indoor Track and Field Championships winners (women)
