= 1924 USA Indoor Track and Field Championships =

American athletics event in New York

- Dates: March 5
- Host city: New York City, New York, United States
- Venue: 22nd Regiment Armory
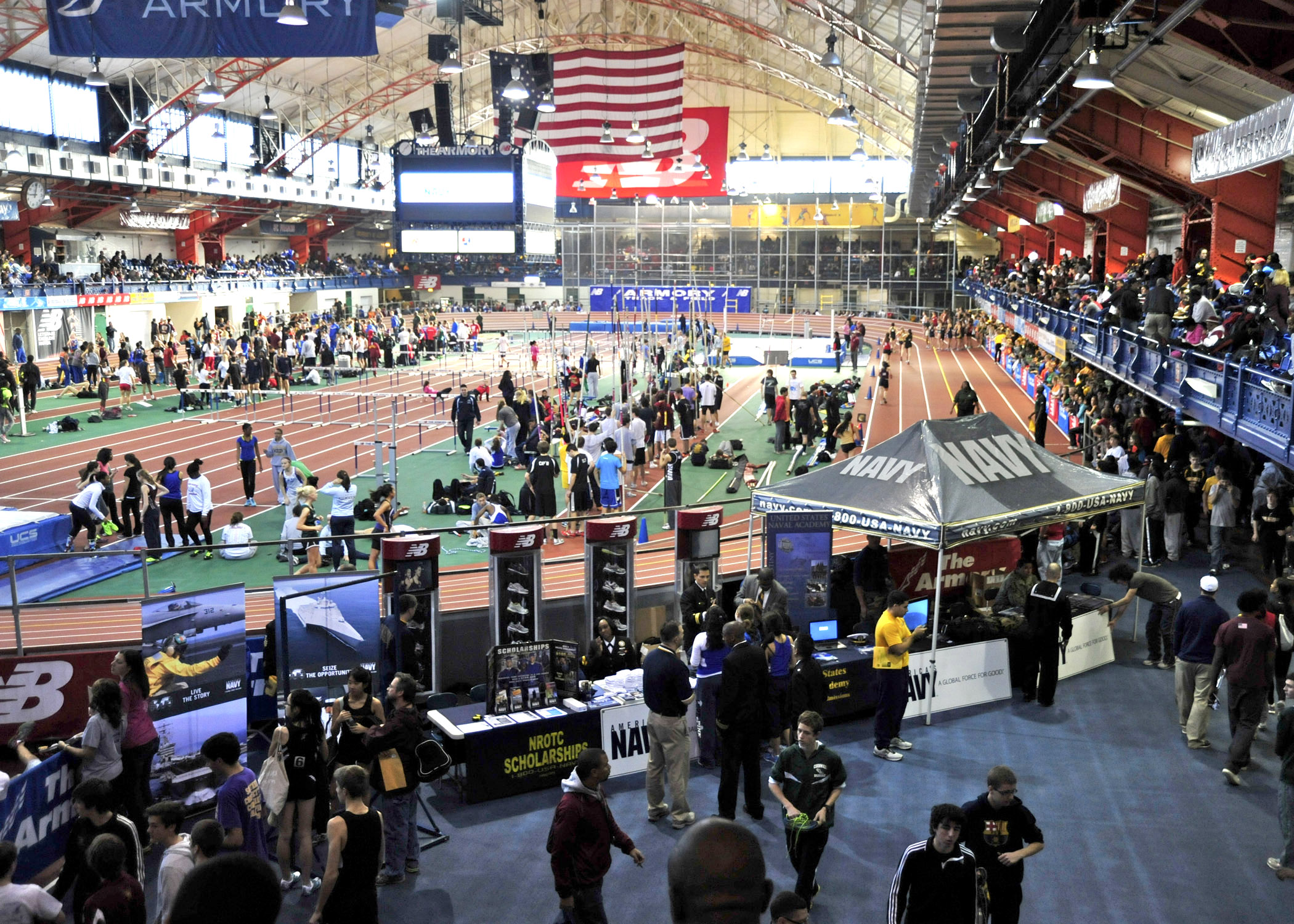
- Level: Senior
- Type: Indoor
- Events: 11

The 1924 USA Indoor Track and Field Championships were organized by the Amateur Athletic Union (AAU) and served as the national championships in indoor track and field for the United States.

The men's championships were held at the 22nd Regiment Armory in New York City, New York, and they took place March 5. Women's championships were not officially held until 1927.

At the championships, the Illinois Athletic Club won the team title although they were disqualified from two relays.

== Medal summary ==
=== Men ===
Event	Gold		Silver	Bronze
60 yards	Loren Murchison	6.6		
300 yards	Loren Murchison	31.6		
600 yards	Walter Mulvihill	1:15.2		
1000 yards	George Marsters	2:17.6		
2 miles	Joie Ray	9:32.2		
70 yards hurdles	Herbert Meyer	9.2		
High jump	Harold Osborn	1.93 m		
Standing high jump	Harry Sweitzer	5 ft 3 in (1.6 m)		
Standing long jump	Irving Reed	3.27 m		
Shot put	Ralph Hills	14.61 m		
1 mile walk	Willie Plant	6:43.4		
