= 1917 USA Indoor Track and Field Championships =

National athletics championship event

- Dates: March 17
- Host city: New York City, New York, United States
- Venue: 22nd Regiment Armory
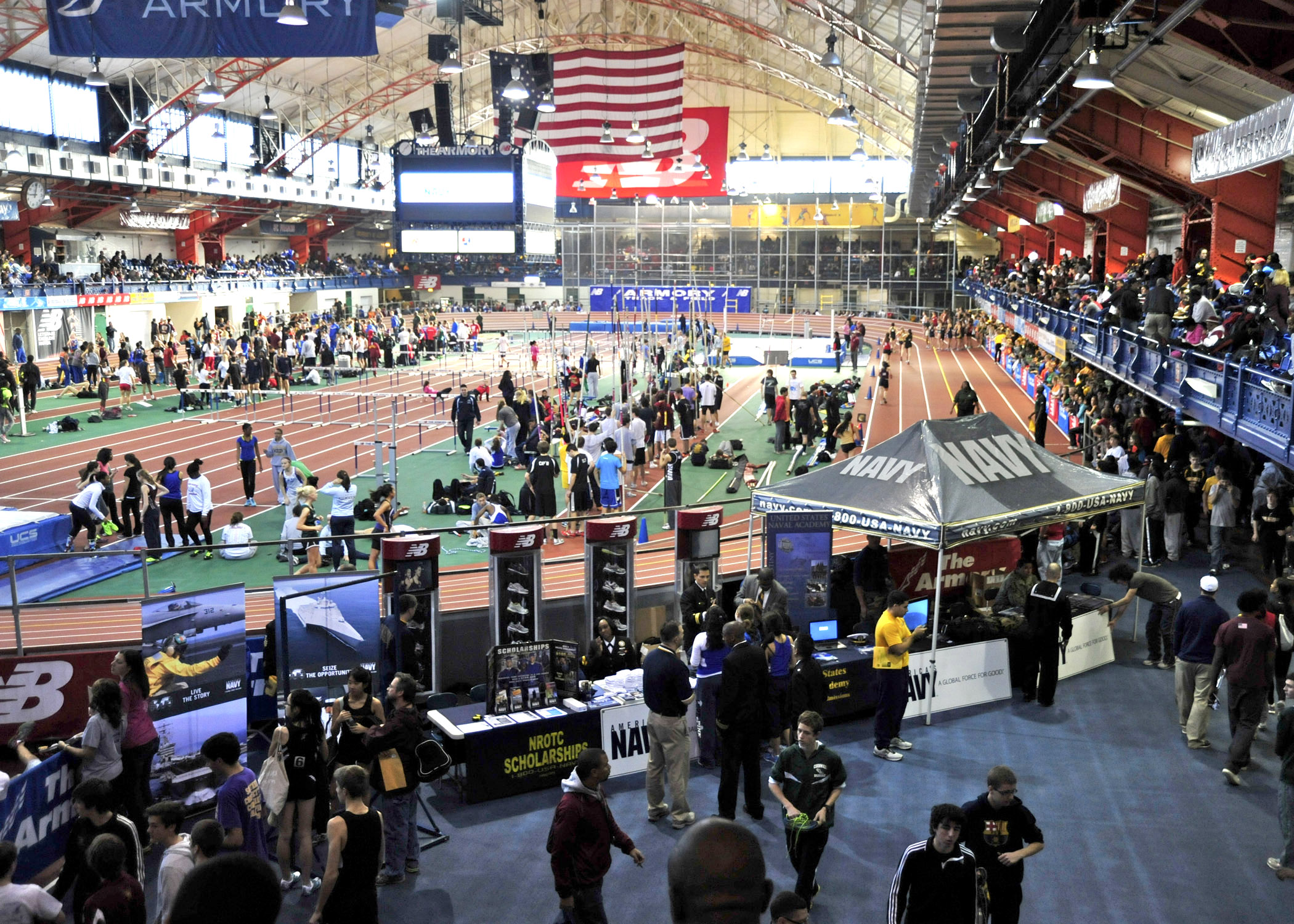
- Level: Senior
- Type: Indoor
- Events: 10

The 1917 USA Indoor Track and Field Championships were organized by the Amateur Athletic Union (AAU) and served as the national championships in indoor track and field for the United States.

The men's championships were held at the 22nd Regiment Armory in New York City, New York, and they took place March 17. Women's championships were not officially held until 1927.

At the championships, John Overton of Yale defended his 1000 yards title, beating Joie Ray by 15 yards. In general, athletes from the West Coast outperformed those from the east coast.

== Medal summary ==
=== Men ===
Event	Gold		Silver	Bronze
60 yards	Jo Loomis	6.4		
300 yards	Andrew Kelly	31.4		
600 yards	Earl Eby	1:14.2		
1000 yards	John Overton	2:14.0		
2 miles	John Ryan	10:04.2		
5 miles	Heywood Holden	25:35 4/5		
70 yards hurdles	Earl Thomson (CAN)	9.4	Arthur Engels	
High jump	Jo Loomis	1.88 m		
Standing high jump	William Taylor	5 ft 1 in (1.54 m)		
Standing long jump	J. C. Hoskins	3.23 m		
Shot put	Patrick McDonald	14.51 m		
2 miles walk	Richard Remer	13:59.2		
