= 1942 USA Indoor Track and Field Championships =

National athletics championship event

- Dates: February 28 (men)
- Host city: New York City, New York, United States (men)
- Venue: Madison Square Garden (men)
- Level: Senior
- Type: Indoor
- Events: 12 (12 men's + 0 women's)

The 1942 USA Indoor Track and Field Championships were organized by the Amateur Athletic Union (AAU) and served as the national championships in indoor track and field for the United States.

The men's edition was held at Madison Square Garden in New York City, New York, and it took place February 28. There was no corresponding women's championships in 1942.

At the championships, Leslie MacMitchell's 20-race win streak in the mile was broken by Gil Dodds.

The indoor steeplechase event was removed from the 1942 program, as was one of the relay events.

== Medal summary ==
=== Men ===
Event	Gold		Silver		Bronze
60 yards	Norwood "Barney" Ewell	6.2			
600 yards	Roy Cochran	1:12.4			
1000 yards	John Borican	2:10.5			
Mile run	Gil Dodds	4:08.7			
3 miles	Greg Rice	13:45.7			
60 yards hurdles	Fred Wolcott	7.2			
High jump	Adam Berry	1.99 m			
High jump	Josh Williamson	1.99 m			
Pole vault	Richmond "Boo" Morcom	4.27 m			
Long jump	José de Assis (BRA)	7.51 m	Norwood Ewell	23 ft 11 1/2 in (7.3 m)	
Shot put	Al Blozis	17.39 m			
Weight throw	Henry Dreyer	17.05 m			
1 mile walk	Al Cicerone	7:13.9			
