= Dave Romansky =

American racewalker (1938–2024)

David L. Romansky (April 8, 1938 – October 31, 2024) was an American racewalker.

== Early career ==
Although he began racewalking only in February 1967, he qualified and represented the United States in the 50 km racewalk at the 1968 Summer Olympics, finishing 26th in 5:38:03.4 while suffering from the flu in the high altitude of Mexico City.

Romansky's personal best was 4:15:24, achieved in 1970, the year he ran the United States National Championship table, winning every distance between 10 km and 40 km (10K, 15K, 20K, 25K, 35K, 40K and the 2 Hour racewalk) That same year he finished 8th in the IAAF World Race Walking Cup in Escborn, West Germany. His time there was 1:30:46.2, just off his personal record of 1:29:50. He was intending to compete in the 1970 national championship 50K race, but went to the wrong location to race.

== Later career ==
Romansky has continued to walk into the masters age divisions, setting numerous records. He holds current M60 American records on the track for 5,000 meters, 10,000 meters and 20,000 meters, as well as road records for 10K, 25K and 30K.

He was elected to the USATF Masters Hall of Fame in 2002, along with the Penns Grove High School Hall of Fame in 1998, the Delaware Track and Field Hall of Fame in 1999, the Shore Athletic Club Hall of Fame in 2000 and the Salem County All Sports Hall of Fame in 2001.

== Personal life and death ==
Romansky was born in Penns Grove, New Jersey on April 8, 1938. He later moved to Pennsville, New Jersey.

Romansky died on October 31, 2024, at the age of 86.
