= 1918 USA Indoor Track and Field Championships =

National athletics championship event

- Dates: March 18
- Host city: New York City, New York, United States
- Venue: 22nd Regiment Armory
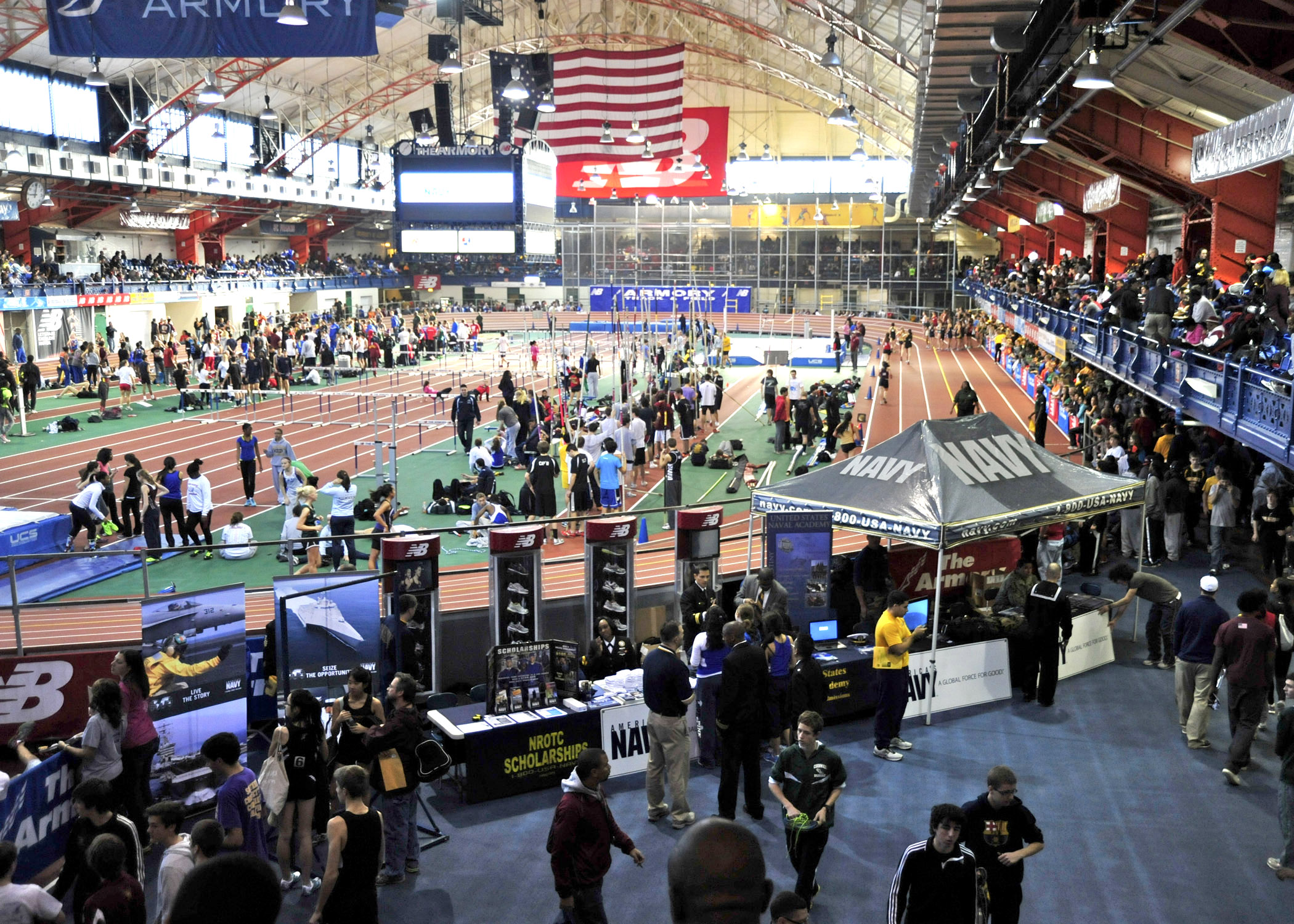
- Level: Senior
- Type: Indoor
- Events: 12

The 1918 USA Indoor Track and Field Championships were organized by the Amateur Athletic Union (AAU) and served as the national championships in indoor track and field for the United States.

The men's championships were held at the 22nd Regiment Armory in New York City, New York, and they took place March 18. Women's championships were not officially held until 1927.

At the championships, Joie Ray equalled the world record for 1000 yards. He beat Mike Devanney by 25 yards. Ray split the half-mile in 1:57 during that race, which was considered a feature of the championships. It was the last time that a 5 miles race was held at the indoor championships.

== Medal summary ==
=== Men ===
Event	Gold		Silver	Bronze
60 yards	William Ganzenmueller	6.8		
300 yards	Sherman Landers	32.4		
600 yards	Marvin Gustavson	1:17.0		
1000 yards	Joie Ray	2:14.0		
2 miles	Edward Garvey	9:40.0		
5 miles	Charles Pores	25:28 1/5		
70 yards hurdles	Harold Barron	9.6		
High jump	Egon Erickson	1.78 m		
Standing high jump	Leo Goehring	5 ft 0 in (1.52 m)		
Standing long jump	Sam Kronman	3.11 m		
Shot put	Douglas Sinclair	13.07 m		
2 miles walk	Richard Remer	14:27.2		
