= Don Bragg =

Don Bragg may refer to:

- Don Bragg (basketball) (1933–1985), American college basketball player
- Don Bragg (pole vaulter) (1935–2019), American pole vaulter
