= 1943 USA Indoor Track and Field Championships =

National athletics championship event

- Dates: February 27 (men)
- Host city: New York City, New York, United States (men)
- Venue: Madison Square Garden (men)
- Level: Senior
- Type: Indoor
- Events: 12 (12 men's + 0 women's)

The 1943 USA Indoor Track and Field Championships were organized by the Amateur Athletic Union (AAU) and served as the national championships in indoor track and field for the United States.

The men's edition was held at Madison Square Garden in New York City, New York, and it took place February 27. There was no corresponding women's championships in 1943.

At the championships, Frank Dixon came from behind to beat Gil Dodds in the mile by a nose.

== Medal summary ==
=== Men ===
Event	Gold		Silver	Bronze
60 yards	Herbert Thompson	6.1		
600 yards	Lewis Smith	1:13.0		
1000 yards	James Rafferty	2:12.8		
Mile run	Frank Dixon	4:09.6		
3 miles	Greg Rice	13:53.5		
60 yards hurdles	Robert Wright	7.4		
High jump	Bill Vessie	1.98 m		
High jump	Josh Williamson	1.98 m		
Pole vault	Cornelius "Dutch" Warmerdam	4.67 m		
Long jump	Norwood "Barney" Ewell	7.21 m		
Shot put	Bernie Mayer	15.95 m		
Weight throw	Henry Dreyer	16.86 m		
1 mile walk	Sune Carlsson (SWE)	7:20.4	Joe Medgyesi	
