= 1911 USA Indoor Track and Field Championships =

National athletics championship event

- Dates: December 26
- Host city: New York City, New York, United States
- Venue: 22nd Regiment Armory
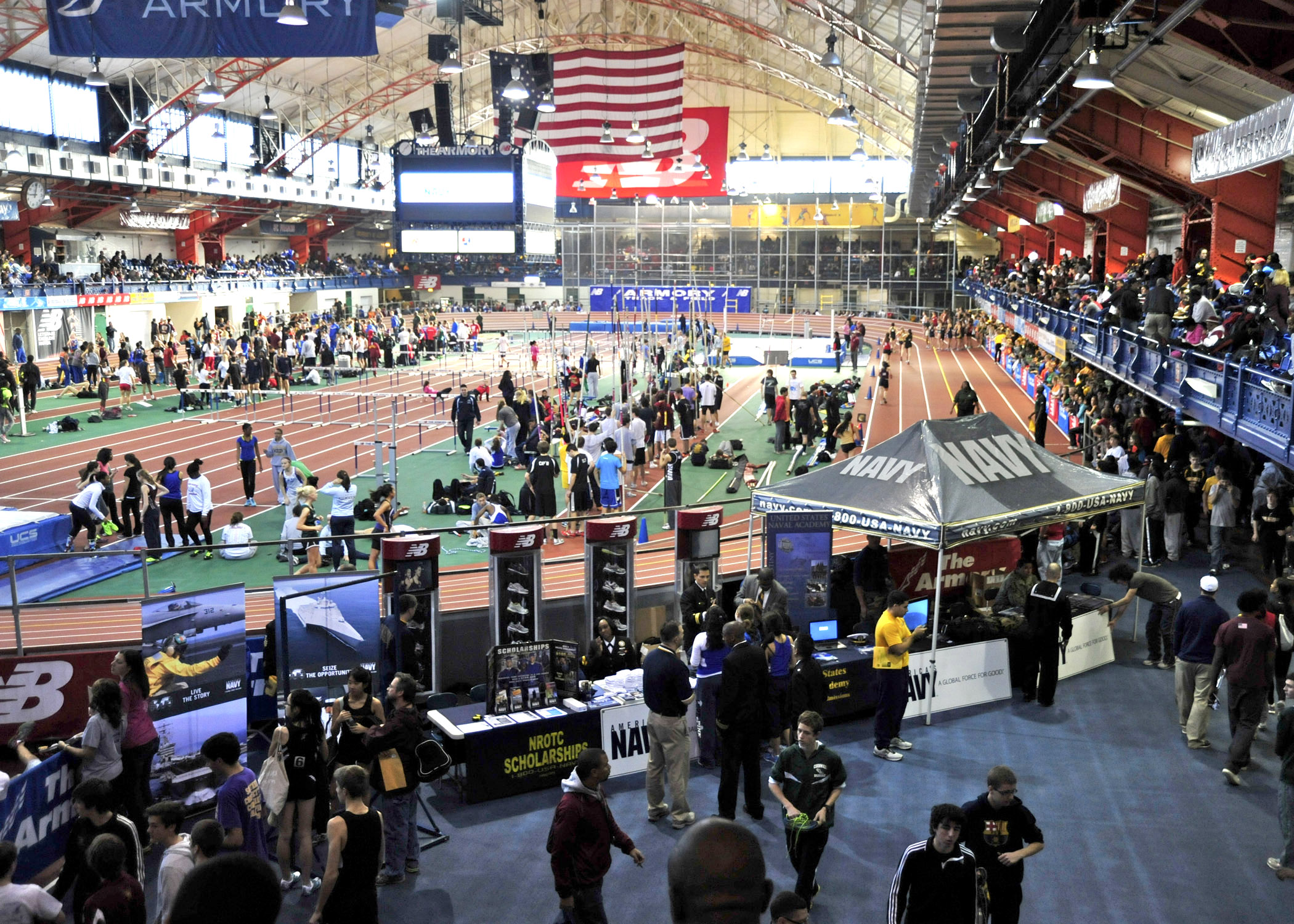
- Level: Senior
- Type: Indoor
- Events: 14

The 1911 USA Indoor Track and Field Championships were organized by the Amateur Athletic Union (AAU) and served as the national championships in indoor track and field for the United States.

The men's championships were held at the 22nd Regiment Armory in New York City, New York, and they took place December 26. Women's championships were not officially held until 1927.

It was the last championships to have been held in the month of December, with all future editions having been held from January through April as of 2024. As a result of this scheduling change, there was no indoor national championships in 1912. The meeting was highlighted by the two miles, which was won by George Bonhag as he began to pull away after splitting the mile in 4:36.

== Medal summary ==
=== Men ===
Event	Gold		Silver	Bronze
60 yards	Alvah Meyer	6.6		
75 yards	Alvah Meyer	7 4/5		
300 yards	LeRoy Dorland	33.2		
600 yards	Abel Kiviat	1:14.0		
1000 yards	Abel Kiviat	2:16.2		
2 miles	George Bonhag	9:20.8		
70 yards hurdles	John Eller	9.4		
High jump	Samuel Lawrence	1.90 m		
Pole vault	Gordon Dukes	3.45 m		
Standing long jump	Samuel Lawrence	3.25 m		
Triple jump	Matthew Fahey	13.20 m		
Pole vault for distance	Harry Babcock	28 ft 0 1/2 in (8.54 m)		
Shot put	Russell Beatty	55 ft 11 1/2 in (17.05 m)		
Weight throw for height	Matthew McGrath	16 ft 3 in (4.95 m)		
3 miles walk	Frank Kaiser	22:55.6		
