= 1944 USA Indoor Track and Field Championships =

National athletics championship event

- Dates: February 27 (men)
- Host city: New York City, New York, United States (men)
- Venue: Madison Square Garden (men)
- Level: Senior
- Type: Indoor
- Events: 12 (12 men's + 0 women's)

The 1944 USA Indoor Track and Field Championships were organized by the Amateur Athletic Union (AAU) and served as the national championships in indoor track and field for the United States.

The men's edition was held at Madison Square Garden in New York City, New York, and it took place February 27. There was no corresponding women's championships in 1944.

At the championships, Gil Dodds broke the 3/4-mile (1320 yards) world record, splitting 3:01 en route to his 4:08.3 mile victory.

== Medal summary ==
=== Men ===
Event	Gold		Silver	Bronze
60 yards	Ed Conwell	6.1		
600 yards	Robert Ufer	1:11.3		
1000 yards	Les Eisenhart	2:15.0		
Mile run	Gil Dodds	4:08.3		
3 miles	Oliver Hunter	14:22.2		
60 yards hurdles	Ed Dugger	7.5		
High jump	Dave Albritton	1.98 m		
High jump	Bill Vessie	1.98 m		
Pole vault	Jack DeField	4.27 m		
Long jump	Norwood "Barney" Ewell	7.46 m		
Shot put	John Yonaker	15.45 m		
Weight throw	Henry Dreyer	16.15 m		
1 mile walk	Joe Medgyesi	7:10.5		
