= 1907 USA Indoor Track and Field Championships =

National athletics championship event

- Dates: October 25-26
- Host city: New York City, New York, United States
- Venue: Madison Square Garden
- Level: Senior
- Type: Indoor
- Events: 22

The 1907 USA Indoor Track and Field Championships were organized by the Amateur Athletic Union (AAU) and served as the national championships in indoor track and field for the United States.

The men's championships were held at the Madison Square Garden in New York City, New York, and they took place October 25-26. Women's championships were not officially held until 1927.

At the championships, Martin Sheridan set a world record in the pole vault despite being beaten in three other disciplines he had contested earlier.

== Medal summary ==
=== Men ===
Event	Gold		Silver	Bronze
60 yards	James O'Connell	6.6		
75 yards	Charles Seitz	8 0/5		
150 yards	Frank Lukeman (CAN)	16 2/5	William Keating	
300 yards	LeRoy Dorland	33.6		
600 yards	Eli Parsons	1:14.4		
1000 yards	Mel Sheppard	2:25.0		
2 miles	George Bonhag	9:42.2		
5 miles	George Bonhag	25:59 1/5		
220 yards hurdles	Forrest Smithson			
300 yards hurdles	Harry Hillman	37 0/5		
High jump	Harry Porter	1.85 m		
Standing high jump	Ray Ewry	5 ft 0 3/4 in (1.54 m)		
Pole vault	Claude Allen	3.43 m		
Pole vault for distance	Martin Sheridan	28 ft 3 in (8.61 m)		
Standing long jump	Ray Ewry	3.25 m		
Triple jump	Platt Adams	13.64 m		
Standing triple jump	Ray Ewry	33 ft 7 1/4 in (10.24 m)		
Shot put (8 lbs)	Wesley Coe	61 ft 2 1/2 in (18.65 m)		
Shot put (24 lbs)	Wesley Coe	35 ft 5 1/4 in (10.8 m)		
Weight throw for height	Matthew McGrath	15 ft 3 in (4.64 m)		
1 mile walk	Sam Liebgold	7:41.2		
3 miles walk	Sam Liebgold	24:56		
