= Martin McGrady =

American sprinter (1946–2006)

Martin McGrady (April 20, 1946, in Akron, Ohio – April 29, 2006) was an American track and field athlete known primarily for running the now obsolete indoor 600 yard dash. Before Eamonn Coghlan, McGrady held the title of "Chairman of the Boards." Sports Illustrated said "Martin McGrady doesn't run the 600, he owns it." Running standard Olympic distances, McGrady "barely earned a footnote" but at the Imperial distance indoors, he was legendary. The race at the 1970 USA Indoor Track and Field Championships where he set the World Record of 1:07.6 in the event is regarded as the best indoor race and the number 7 track and field competition of the 20th century. McGrady's record stood for 22 years until it was finally beaten by Mark Everett.

By running the odd distance, McGrady did not face softer competition. Reigning Olympic Champions/World Record holders Ralph Doubell (800 m) and Lee Evans (400 m) wanted the good race against McGrady. The racing rivalry between Evans and McGrady is still remembered. They are pictured at the finish of a 600 on the cover of the March 1968 issue of Track and Field News, of course with McGrady taking the victory over a leaning Evans and Jim Kemp. McGrady won three straight National championships and had three straight victories at the prestigious Millrose Games.

McGrady attended Garfield High School in Akron and studied Medical Technology at Central State University, where he was coached by David Youngblade. He set the first of three world records in the 600 while at Central State, just a week before winning the 1966 NCAA Men's Indoor Track and Field Championships. He also tied the world record in the 500 metres.

On October 8, 2010, Youngblade had the honor to induct McGrady into the Central State University Hall of Fame.
