= 1947 USA Indoor Track and Field Championships =

National athletics championship event

- Dates: February 22 (men)
- Host city: New York City, New York, United States (men)
- Venue: Madison Square Garden (men)
- Level: Senior
- Type: Indoor
- Events: 12 (12 men's + 0 women's)

The 1947 USA Indoor Track and Field Championships were organized by the Amateur Athletic Union (AAU) and served as the national championships in indoor track and field for the United States.

The men's edition was held at Madison Square Garden in New York City, New York, and it took place February 22. There was no corresponding women's edition that year.

1947 was the last year that a men's championships were held without a corresponding women's meet; in all years since as of 2024, both men's and women's championships were always held. At the championships, Gil Dodds of Boston won the mile in 4:12.7 by 20 yards. About 15,000 spectators attended.

== Medal summary ==
=== Men ===
Event	Gold		Silver	Bronze
60 yards	Ed Conwell	6.1		
600 yards	George Guida	1:13.7		
1000 yards	Bill McGuire	2:13.9		
Mile run	Gil Dodds	4:12.7		
3 miles	Curt Stone	14:22.6		
60 yards hurdles	Harrison Dillard	7.4		
High jump	John Vislocky	2.01 m		
Pole vault	Guinn Smith	4.27 m		
Long jump	Herb Douglas	7.44 m		
Shot put	Irving Kintisch	16.00 m		
Weight throw	Henry Dreyer	17.00 m		
1 mile walk	Ernie Weber	6:44.2		
