= 1938 USA Indoor Track and Field Championships =

National athletics championship event

- Dates: February 26 (men)
- Host city: New York City, New York, United States (men)
- Venue: Madison Square Garden (men)
- Level: Senior
- Type: Indoor
- Events: 13 (13 men's + 0 women's)

The 1938 USA Indoor Track and Field Championships were organized by the Amateur Athletic Union (AAU) and served as the national championships in indoor track and field for the United States.

The men's edition was held at Madison Square Garden in New York City, New York, and it took place February 26. The corresponding women's championships were not held in 1938.

At the championships, Glenn Cunningham broke Gene Venzke's 1500 m record, winning by 35 yards. About 15,000 spectators attended.

== Medal summary ==
=== Men ===
Event	Gold		Silver	Bronze
60 m	Ben Johnson	6.6		
600 m	Jim Herbert	1:20.3		
1000 m	Frank Slater	2:29.3		
1500 m	Glenn Cunningham	3:48.4		
5000 m	Don Lash	14:39.0		
65 m hurdles	Forrest "Spec" Towns	8.7		
3000 m steeplechase (Note: Run without a water jump.)	Joe McCluskey	8:54.4		
High jump	Lloyd Thompson	2.01 m		
Pole vault	Richard Ganslen	4.11 m		
Long jump	Ed Gordon	7.11 m		
Shot put	Frank Ryan	16.06 m		
Weight throw	Irving Folwartshny	17.42 m		
1500 m walk	Otto Kotraba	6:21.8		
