= 1925 USA Indoor Track and Field Championships =

American athletics event in Kentucky

- Dates: February 28
- Host city: Louisville, Kentucky, United States
- Venue: Jefferson County Armory
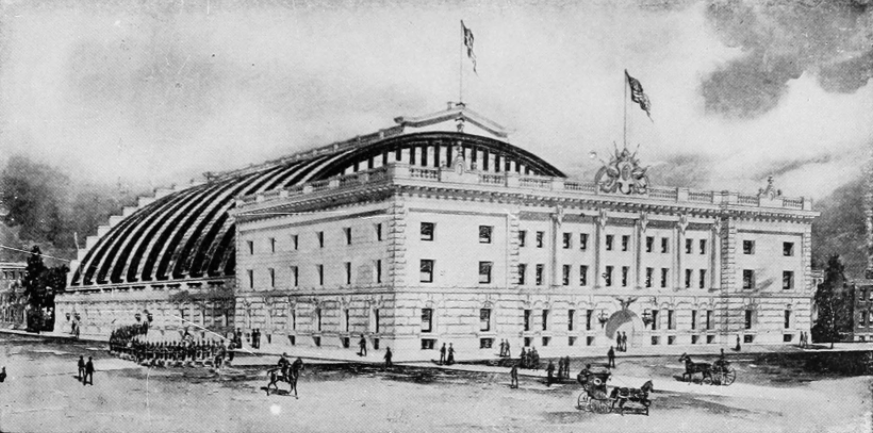
- Level: Senior
- Type: Indoor
- Events: 11

The 1925 USA Indoor Track and Field Championships were organized by the Amateur Athletic Union (AAU) and served as the national championships in indoor track and field for the United States.

The men's championships were held at the Jefferson County Armory in Louisville, Kentucky, and they took place February 28. Women's championships were not officially held until 1927.

At the championships, Cecil Coaffee broke the world record for 60 yards in the first semifinal, running 6 1/5 seconds. The men's 2 miles steeplechase was added for the first time. It was also the first time that the pole vault for height was contested (pole vault for distance was staged previously at the championships).

== Medal summary ==
=== Men ===
Event	Gold		Silver	Bronze
60 yards	Cecil Coaffee	6.2		
300 yards	Sam Rosen	33.2		
600 yards	Vincent Lally	1:15.8		
1000 yards	Lloyd Hahn	2:13.8		
2 miles	Paavo Nurmi (FIN)	9:09.6	Harold Kennedy	
70 yards hurdles	Harold Osborn	8.6		
2 miles steeplechase	Willie Ritola (FIN)	9:59 2/5	Russell Payne	
High jump	Harold Osborn	1.94 m		
Standing high jump	Harold Osborn	5 ft 2 in (1.57 m)		
Pole vault	Paul Jones	3.40 m		
Standing long jump	Harold Osborn	3.30 m		
Shot put	Douglas Sinclair	12.89 m		
1 mile walk	Alexander Zellar	7:04.8		
