= Harry Hinkel =

American racewalker

Personal information
- Full name: Harry Robert Hinkel
- Born: January 13, 1904 New York City, United States
- Died: April 12, 2001 (aged 97)

Sport
- Sport: Athletics
- Event: Racewalking

Harry Robert Hinkel (January 13, 1904 – April 12, 2001) was an American racewalker. He competed at the 1924 Summer Olympics and the 1932 Summer Olympics.
