= Max Bohland =

American long-distance runner

Personal information
- Nationality: American
- Born: February 4, 1896 Pegau, Kingdom of Saxony, German Empire
- Died: February 1975 Queens, New York, United States

Sport
- Sport: Athletics
- Event: Long-distance running

Max Bohland (February 4, 1896 – February 1975) was an American athlete. He competed in the men's individual cross country event at the 1920 Summer Olympics.
