= Tom Deckard =

American long-distance runner

Thomas Marshall Deckard (April 6, 1916 – July 1, 1982) was an American runner. He competed in the 5000 meters at the 1936 Summer Olympics and held world bests in the 3000-meter indoor and two-mile outdoor steeplechase races.

== Biography ==
Deckard was born in Bloomington, Indiana on April 6, 1916. He studied at Bloomington High School and later Indiana University; he won the mile run at the 1934 Indiana high school state meet in a meeting record 4:26.3. At Indiana he was a teammate of leading distance runner Don Lash; as a sophomore, he placed second behind Lash in the 5000 meters at the 1936 NCAA championships.

Deckard placed fourth in the 10,000 meters at the 1936 AAU outdoor national championships; the race also served as a national qualifier for the 1936 Summer Olympics in Berlin, and Deckard missed making the team by one place. The main U.S. Olympic Trials were held the following week, with Deckard entered in the 5000 meters; he received help from Lash, who was the early leader but slowed down to offer his teammate encouragement and support. Running with Lash, Deckard climbed to third place and eventually finished a clear fifty yards ahead of the next man; he clinched a place on the American team, together with Lash and Louis Zamperini. At the Olympics, Deckard placed ninth in his heat and was eliminated.

With the encouragement of his coach at Indiana, Billy Hayes, Deckard turned to the 3000-meter steeplechase; he won the AAU indoor championship in that event in 1937. His winning time, 8:48.6, was a new indoor world best; it was faster than the world outdoor best, though due to differences in tracks and the rules the indoor and outdoor records could not be fairly compared. In 1939 he regained the title in an only slightly slower time, 8:49.4, outkicking defending champion Joe McCluskey on the final lap. Deckard never won an outdoor AAU title; his best finish was second in the 5000 meters in 1937. He set a long-standing American record and world best for the outdoor two-mile steeplechase (9:55.2) in New Orleans on January 1, 1939. In addition, he ran on a record-setting 4 × 1 mile relay team at the 1937 Penn Relays; the Indiana University team (Mel Trutt, Jim Smith, Deckard and Lash) won in 17:16.2, breaking the U.S. national team's world record from the previous year by one second. This world record was officially ratified.

Deckard graduated from Indiana, receiving a Bachelor of Science degree in 1939 and a Master of Science degree in 1940. The cancellation of the 1940 Summer Olympic Games due to World War II cost him the opportunity to attempt to qualify for a second Olympics. He was track coach at Bloomington High in 1941–42 before joining the U.S. Navy, where he served for the duration of the war. Deckard returned to Indiana University in 1946 as head coach of the cross-country team and assistant coach of the track team. In 1948 Deckard moved to Drake University, where he was track head coach and director of the Drake Relays; he resigned the job in late 1954 to become a businessman.

Deckard, an entrepreneur, built a highly successful business, Flasher Light and Barricade in Indianapolis, which dominated the Central Indiana construction market for three decades. He routinely hired Indiana University students, living in Indianapolis, as summer employees as well as men from the largely Black Martindale neighborhood where his business was located. His office was a small museum of memorabilia from the 1936 Berlin Olyimpics. He never stopped reliving his "Glory Days" as one of the world's top middle-distance runners in the 1930s.

Deckard received the Z. G. Clevenger Award in 1971. He died in Indianapolis in July 1982.
