= Walter Whalen =

American high jumper

Walter Leo Whalen (February 14, 1898 – April 7, 1966) was an American track and field athlete who competed in the 1920 Summer Olympics. In 1920, he finished fourth in the high jump competition.
