= Allan Tolmich =

American hurdler

Personal information
- Nationality: American
- Born: March 30, 1918 Detroit, Michigan
- Died: March 20, 2012 (aged 93) Fishers, Indiana

Sport
- Sport: Hurdles
- College team: Wayne State University

Allan Tolmich (March 30, 1918 – March 20, 2012 ) was a track and field athlete. He set world records in the indoor 45 low hurdles, indoor 50 low hurdles, indoor 60-yard hurdles, 70 high hurdles, and 200m hurdles.

== Biography ==
Tolmich was born in Detroit, Michigan, and was Jewish. He attended Wayne State University, joined its track team as a walk-on in 1934, and was captain of it in 1936 to 1937. He was an All-American from 1937 to 1941, and a National Amateur Athletic Union (AAU) Champion in 1937, 1939, 1940, and 1941.

Between 1936 and 1941, he set 10 world and United States indoor track and field records, including the 60-yard hurdles, 110-meter hurdles, and 120-yard hurdles, and tied 5 of them. He was a National AAU Champion in 1937, 1939, 1940 and 1941.

While at Wayne State, in 1937 he twice broke the world record in the 200 meter hurdles at the AAU Championships (running it in 23.4 seconds and 23.3 seconds, on July 3), and won the national 110 meter high hurdles.

In 1939, he won the AAU national indoor 65-meter hurdles in 8.4 seconds.

In 1940, he set a new world record in the indoor 60-yard hurdles at Madison Square Garden, at 8.4 seconds, breaking his own record by .01 seconds, as well as setting world records in indoor 50 low hurdles (6.0 seconds) and the 70 high hurdles (8.4 seconds). In 1941, he set a new world record (5.4 seconds) in the indoor 45 low hurdles, breaking a 40-year-old record, and tied the world record in the 45 high hurdles (5.6 seconds).

In August 1942, he was commissioned as a lieutenant in the Army Air Force, as World War II began to involve the United States.

In 1976, Tolmich was inducted into the inaugural class of the Wayne State University Sports Hall of Fame. He was also inducted into the Michigan Jewish Sports Hall of Fame in 1999, and into the International Jewish Sports Hall of Fame in 2002.

== See also ==
- List of select Jewish track and field athletes
