= Thomas Halpin (runner) =

American middle-distance runner

Thomas Halpin (May 17, 1892 – September 9, 1960) was an American middle distance runner who competed in the 1912 Summer Olympics.
