= John Borican =

American long-distance runner

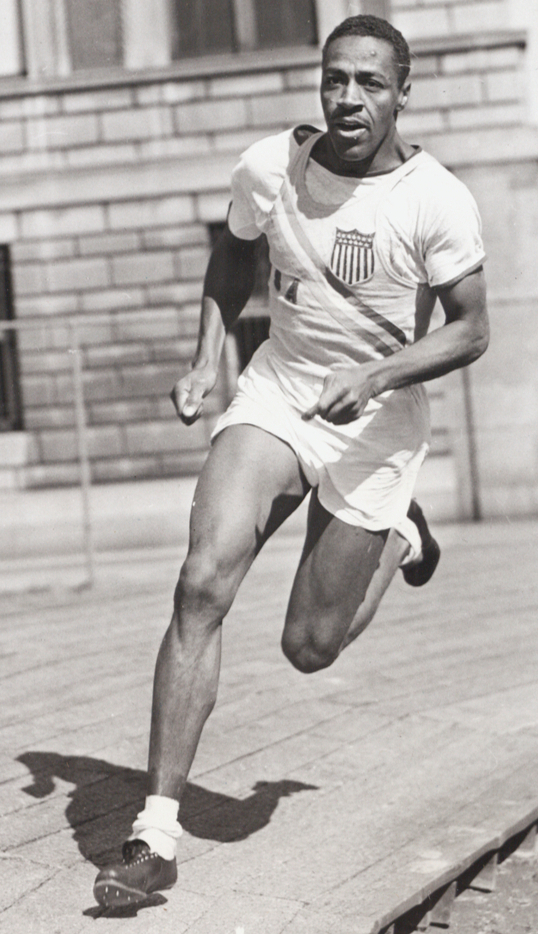
- Borican in 1942

Personal information
- Born: John J. Borican; April 4, 1913 Bridgeton, New Jersey, U.S.
- Died: December 22, 1942 (aged 29) Bridgeton, New Jersey, U.S.
- Education: Virginia State University; Columbia University

Sport
- Sport: Athletics
- Events: Long-distance running Decathlon; Pentathlon
Medal record
Men's athletics
Representing United States
USA Championships
Gold medal – first place	1941 Philadelphia	Pentathlon
Silver medal – second place	1941 Philadelphia	Decathlon

John J. Borican (April 4, 1913 – December 22, 1942) was an American long-distance runner.

== Life and career ==
Borican was born in Bridgeton, New Jersey, the son of C. H. Borican. He excelled at track at Bridgeton High School. He attended Temple University, but did not graduate, and then attended Virginia State University, earning his undergraduate degree. He also attended Columbia University, earning his Master of Arts degree. He was a portrait painter.

In 1940, Borican was awarded the John J. Hallanan Trophy. In two years, he set a world record in the 1000-meter run with a time of 2:24.3. He held six world records in long-distance running. He then later took up the decathlon and men's pentathlon, winning both events at the 1941 USA Outdoor Track and Field Championships.

== Death and legacy ==
Borican died of pernicious anemia on December 22, 1942, in Bridgeton, New Jersey, at the age of 29.

In 2000, Borican was posthumously inducted into the National Track and Field Hall of Fame.
