= Edward Renz =

American racewalker

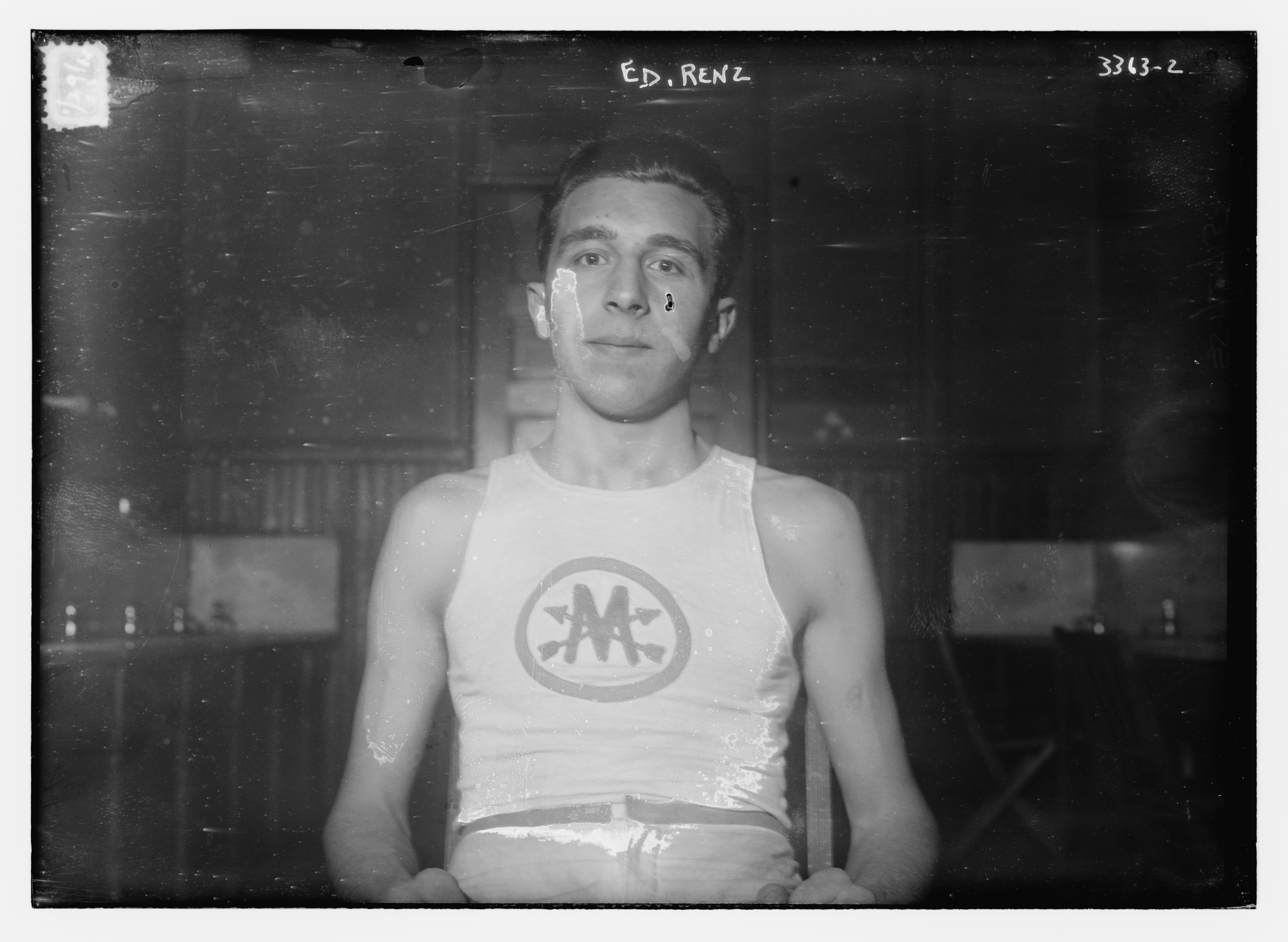

Personal information
- Born: October 14, 1891 Brooklyn, United States
- Died: March 6, 1976 (aged 84) New York City, United States
- Height: 5 ft 10 in (178 cm)
- Weight: 66 kg (146 lb)

Sport
- Sport: Athletics
- Event: Racewalking
- Club: Mohawk Athletics Club

Achievements and titles
- Personal best: 10 km walk: 48:15.8 (1912)

Edward Renz (October 14, 1891 – March 6, 1976) was an American racewalker. He competed in the 10 km walk at the 1912 Summer Olympics.
