= William Plant (race walker) =

American racewalker

Personal information
- Nationality: USA
- Born: September 10, 1892 Brooklyn, United States
- Died: May 1, 1969 (aged 76) Brooklyn, United States
- Height: 6 ft 0 in (183 cm)
- Weight: 73 kg (161 lb)

Sport
- Sport: Athletics
- Event: Racewalking
- Club: Morningside Athletics Club

Achievements and titles
- Personal best: 7 km walk: 53:03.4 (1917)

William Plant (September 10, 1892 – May 1, 1969) was an American racewalker. He competed in the 10 km walk at the 1920 Summer Olympics.
