= Richard Remer =

American racewalker

Olympic medal record

Men's athletics

Representing the United States
Bronze medal – third place	1920 Antwerp	3 km walk

Richard Frederick Remer (June 21, 1883 – July 18, 1973) was an American athlete who competed mainly in the 3 kilometre walk. Early in his athletic career, he competed as a member of the Irish American Athletic Club.

He competed for the United States at the 1920 Summer Olympics in Antwerp, Belgium, in the 3 kilometre walk, where he won the bronze medal.

He was born in Brooklyn, New York and died in Fort Lauderdale, Florida.
