= List of USA Indoor Track and Field Championships winners (women) =

The USA Indoor Track and Field Championships is an annual indoor track and field competition in the sport of athletics currently organized by USA Track & Field. It serves as the national championships for the sport in the United States. The venue of the championships is decided on an annual basis and sometimes indoor combined track and field events championships were held separately.

The Amateur Athletic Union held a women's championship for the first time in 1927, which has since been held annually with exceptions. The men's and women's championships have been held jointly since 1965. Following professionalization of the sport, the running of the national championships was taken over by The Athletics Congress of the USA (TAC) since 1980. TAC rebranded as USA Track & Field (USATF) in 1993.

The national championships for outdoor track and field and other sport of athletics disciplines are held separately from the indoor competition.

== Athletes with the most wins ==
As of 2026, not including relays:

Rank	Athlete	Wins
1st	Nancy Cowperthwaite-Phillips	13
2nd	Diane Dixon	11
3rd	Helen Stephens	9
3rd	Joetta Clark Diggs	9
3rd	Martha Watson	9
3rd	Maren Seidler	9
3rd	Vashti Cunningham	9
8th	Stanisława Walasiewicz	8
8th	Willye White	8
8th	Ajeé Wilson	8
8th	Maria Michta-Coffey	8
8th	Stacy Dragila	8
8th	Jillian Camarena-Williams	8
8th	Sue Brodock	8

== List of winners ==
=== Track ===
==== 60 m (40 yards, 50 m, 50 yards, 60 yards, 55 m) ====
USA Indoor Track and Field Championships winners in women's 60 m (40 yards, 50 m, 50 yards, 60 yards, 55 m)
1927–1979 Amateur Athletic Union	1927: Rosa Grosse (CAN), Eleanor Egg (2nd); 1928: Katherine Mearls; 1929: Mary Carew; 1930: Mary Carew; 1931: Mary Carew; 1932: Mary Carew; 1933: Pearl Young; 1934: Stanisława Walasiewicz (POL), Louise Stokes (3rd); 1935: Helen Stephens; 1936: Helen Stephens; 1937: Helen Stephens; 1941: Jean Lane; 1945: Alice Coachman; 1946: Alice Coachman; 1948: Juanita Watson; 1949: Dolores Dwyer; 1950: Dolores Dwyer; 1951: Catherine Hardy Lavender; 1952: Dolores Dwyer; 1953: Mabel Landry; 1954: Mabel Landry; 1955: Isabelle Daniels; 1956: Isabelle Daniels; 1957: Isabelle Daniels; 1958: Isabelle Daniels; 1959: Wilma Rudolph; 1960: Wilma Rudolph; 1961: Willye White; 1962: Willye White; 1963: Willye White; 1964: Debbie Thompson; 1965: Wyomia Tyus; 1966: Wyomia Tyus; 1967: Wyomia Tyus; 1968: Barbara Ferrell; 1969: Barbara Ferrell; 1970: Chi Cheng (TPE), Iris Davis (2nd); 1971: Pat Hawkins; 1972: Iris Davis; 1973: Iris Davis; 1974: Theresa Montgomery; 1975: Alice Annum (GHA), Angel Doyle (2nd); 1976: Lisa Hopkins; 1977: Brenda Morehead; 1978: Brenda Morehead; 1979: Evelyn Ashford
1980–1992 The Athletics Congress	1980: Evelyn Ashford; 1981: Evelyn Ashford; 1982: Evelyn Ashford; 1983: Evelyn Ashford; 1984: Alice Brown; 1985: Alice Brown; 1986: Jeanette Bolden; 1987: Anelia Nuneva (BUL), Jeanette Bolden (2nd); 1988: Evelyn Ashford, Gwen Torrence; 1989: Gwen Torrence; 1990: Michelle Finn-Burrell; 1991: Michelle Finn-Burrell; 1992: Michelle Finn-Burrell
1993–present USA Track & Field	1993: Gail Devers; 1994: Gwen Torrence; 1995: Gwen Torrence; 1996: Gwen Torrence; 1997: Gail Devers; 1998: Christy Opara-Thompson (NGR), Carlette Guidry-White (2nd); 1999: Gail Devers; 2000: Carlette Guidry-White; 2001: Chryste Gaines; 2002: Chryste Gaines; 2003: Angela Williams; 2004: Gail Devers; 2005: Angela Daigle; 2006: Me'Lisa Barber; 2007: Hasani Roseby; 2008: Angela Williams; 2009: Me'Lisa Barber; 2010: Carmelita Jeter; 2011: Alexandria Anderson; 2012: Tianna Bartoletta; 2013: Barbara Pierre; 2014: Tianna Bartoletta; 2015: Tianna Bartoletta; 2016: Barbara Pierre; 2017: Morolake Akinosun; 2018: Javianne Oliver; 2019: Shania Collins; 2020: Mikiah Brisco; 2022: Mikiah Brisco; 2023: Aleia Hobbs; 2024: Aleia Hobbs; 2025: Celera Barnes; 2026: Jacious Sears
Notes	* Distances have varied as follows: 40 yards (1927–32), 50 meters (1933–54), 50 yards (1956–64), 60 yards (1965–86), 55 meters (1987–90)

==== 400 m (440 yards, 300 m) ====
USA Indoor Track and Field Championships winners in women's 400 m (440 yards, 300 m)
1959–1979 Amateur Athletic Union	1958: Annie Smith; 1959: Lillian Greene-Chamberlain; 1960: Rose Lovelace; 1961: Lillian Greene-Chamberlain; 1962: Sue Knott; 1963: Sue Knott; 1964: Valerie Carter; 1965: Norma Harris, Janell Smith; 1966: Charlette Cooke; 1967: Kathy Hammond; 1968: Lois Anne Drinkwater; 1969: Jarvis Scott; 1970: Kathy Hammond; 1971: Jarvis Scott; 1972: Kathy Hammond; 1973: Brenda Walsh (CAN), Kathy Hammond (2nd); 1974: Brenda Nichols; 1975: Robin Campbell; 1976: Lorna Forde (BAR), Sharon Dabney (2nd); 1977: Lorna Forde (BAR), Yolanda Rich (2nd); 1978: Kim Thomas; 1979: June Griffith (GUY), Yolanda Rich (2nd)
1980–1992 The Athletics Congress	1980: Rosalyn Bryant; 1981: Diane Dixon; 1982: Maxine Underwood; 1983: Diane Dixon; 1984: Diane Dixon; 1985: Diane Dixon; 1986: Diane Dixon; 1987: Diane Dixon; 1988: Diane Dixon; 1989: Diane Dixon; 1990: Diane Dixon; 1991: Diane Dixon; 1992: Diane Dixon
1993–present USA Track & Field	1993: Jillian Richardson (CAN), Jearl Miles Clark (2nd); 1994: Maicel Malone-Wallace; 1995: Jearl Miles Clark; 1996: Maicel Malone-Wallace; 1997: Jearl Miles Clark; 1998: Jearl Miles Clark; 1999: Jearl Miles Clark; 2000: Suziann Reid; 2001: Suziann Reid; 2002: Monique Hennagan; 2003: Monique Hennagan; 2004: Julian Clay; 2005: DeeDee Trotter; 2006: Sanya Richards-Ross; 2007: DeeDee Trotter; 2008: Shareese Woods; 2009: Dominique Darden; 2010: Debbie Dunn; 2011: Natasha Hastings; 2012: Sanya Richards-Ross; 2013: Ebonie Floyd; 2014: Francena McCorory; 2015: Natasha Hastings; 2016: Quanera Hayes; 2017: Phyllis Francis; 2018: Courtney Okolo; 2019: Brittany Brown; 2020: Wadeline Jonathas; 2022: Lynna Irby; 2023: Anna Hall; 2024: Alexis Holmes; 2025: Alexis Holmes; 2026: Rosey Effiong
Notes	* Distances have varied as follows: 440 yards (1959–1986), 400 meters (1987–date) alternating with 300 meters in odd numbered years starting 2015. The 1958 race was run as an exhibition.

==== 800 m (880 yards, 1000 m) ====
USA Indoor Track and Field Championships winners in women's 800 m (880 yards, 1000 m)
1927–1979 Amateur Athletic Union	1958: Grace Butcher; 1959: Harriet Douthitt; 1960: Grace Butcher; 1961: Helen Shipley; 1962: Leah Bennett; 1963: Leah Bennett Ferris; 1964: Sandy Knott; 1965: Abby Hoffman (CAN), Marie Mulder (4th); 1966: Zsuzsa Szabó (HUN), Marie Mulder (2nd); 1967: Madeline Manning; 1968: Madeline Manning; 1969: Madeline Manning; 1970: Francie Kraker Goodridge; 1971: Abby Hoffman (CAN), Cheryl Toussaint (2nd); 1972: Cheryl Toussaint; 1973: Cheryl Toussaint; 1974: Mary Decker; 1975: Kathy Weston; 1976: Johanna Forman; 1977: Cyndy Poor; 1978: Debbie Vetter; 1979: Wendy Koenig
1980–1992 The Athletics Congress	1980: Madeline Manning; 1981: Delisa Walton-Floyd; 1982: Leann Warren; 1983: Delisa Walton-Floyd; 1984: Lyubov Gurina (URS), Robin Campbell (2nd); 1985: Cristieana Cojocaru (ROM), Rose Monday (3rd); 1986: Sigrun Wodars (GDR), Delisa Walton-Floyd (3rd); 1987: Christine Wachtel (GDR), Joetta Clark Diggs (3rd); 1988: Mitica Constantin (ROM), Joetta Clark Diggs (2nd); 1989: Joetta Clark Diggs; 1990: Joetta Clark Diggs; 1991: Meredith Rainey-Valmon; 1992: Maria Mutola (MOZ), Meredith Rainey-Valmon (2nd)
1993–present USA Track & Field	1993: Maria Mutola (MOZ), Joetta Clark Diggs (2nd); 1994: Maria Mutola (MOZ), Joetta Clark Diggs (2nd); 1995: Maria Mutola (MOZ), Meredith Rainey-Valmon (2nd); 1996: Joetta Clark Diggs; 1997: Joetta Clark Diggs; 1998: Joetta Clark Diggs; 1999: Meredith Rainey-Valmon; 2000: Hazel Clark; 2001: Jearl Miles Clark; 2002: Nicole Teter; 2003: Nicole Teter; 2004: Jen Toomey; 2005: Hazel Clark; 2006: Alice Schmidt; 2007: Nikeya Green; 2008: Nicole Teter; 2009: Katie Waits; 2010: Anna Willard; 2011: Phoebe Wright; 2012: Erica Moore; 2013: Ajeé Wilson; 2014: Ajeé Wilson; 2015: Lauren Wallace; 2016: Ajeé Wilson; 2017: Charlene Lipsey; 2018: Ajeé Wilson; 2019: Ajeé Wilson; 2020: Ajeé Wilson; 2022: Ajeé Wilson; 2023: Nia Akins; 2024: Allie Wilson; 2025: Nia Akins; 2026: Addison Wiley
Notes	* Distances have varied as follows: 880 yards (1959–1986), 800 meters (1987–date) except 1000 meters (2015, 2017,2019). The 1958 race was run as an exhibition.

==== Mile (1500 m) ====
USA Indoor Track and Field Championships winners in women's mile run (1500 m)
1967–1979 Amateur Athletic Union	1967: Doris Brown; 1968: Doris Brown; 1969: Abby Hoffman (CAN), Cheryl Bridges (2nd); 1970: Kathy Gibbons; 1971: Doris Brown; 1972: Doris Brown; 1973: Lyudmila Bragina (URS), Debbie Heald (3rd); 1974: Robin Campbell; 1975: Francie Larrieu Smith; 1976: Jan Merrill; 1977: Francie Larrieu Smith; 1978: Francie Larrieu Smith; 1979: Francie Larrieu Smith
1980–1992 The Athletics Congress	1980: Maggie Keyes; 1981: Jan Merrill; 1982: Cathie Twomey; 1983: Darlene Beckford; 1984: Brit McRoberts (CAN), Jan Merrill (2nd); 1985: Doina Melinte (ROM); 1986: Maricica Puică (ROM), Josephine White (3rd); 1987: Doina Melinte (ROM), Darlene Beckford (2nd); 1988: Doina Melinte (ROM), Alisa Harvey (2nd); 1989: Linda Sheskey; 1990: Doina Melinte (ROM), PattiSue Plumer (2nd); 1991: Suzy Favor Hamilton; 1992: Lynn Jennings
1993–present USA Track & Field	1993: Shelly Steely; 1994: Hassiba Boulmerka (ALG), Gina Procaccio (2nd); 1995: Regina Jacobs; 1996: Stephanie Best; 1997: Mary Decker; 1998: Suzy Favor Hamilton; 1999: Suzy Favor Hamilton; 2000: Regina Jacobs; 2001: Collette Liss; 2002: Regina Jacobs; 2003: Regina Jacobs; 2004: Jen Toomey; 2005: Jen Toomey; 2006: Treniere Moser; 2007: Shayne Culpepper; 2008: Christin Wurth-Thomas; 2009: Anna Willard; 2010: Morgan Uceny; 2011: Jenny Simpson; 2012: Jenny Simpson; 2013: Mary Cain; 2014: Mary Cain; 2015: Shannon Rowbury; 2016: Brenda Martinez; 2017: Shelby Houlihan; 2018: Shelby Houlihan; 2019: Colleen Quigley; 2020: Shelby Houlihan; 2022: Heather MacLean; 2023: Nikki Hiltz; 2024: Nikki Hiltz; 2025: Nikki Hiltz; 2026: Nikki Hiltz
Notes	*Distances have varied as follows: Mile (1967–2002), except 1997 and 1999, 2007 and odd numbered years since 2011, 1500 meters 1997, 1999, (2003–6, 2008–2010) and even numbered years since 2010

==== 3000 m (2 miles) ====
USA Indoor Track and Field Championships winners in women's 3000 m (2 miles)
1975–1979 Amateur Athletic Union	1975: Brenda Webb; 1976: Jan Merrill; 1977: Francie Larrieu Smith; 1978: Brenda Webb; 1979: Julie Brown
1980–1992 The Athletics Congress	1980: Cindy Bremser; 1981: Francie Larrieu Smith; 1982: Joan Hansen; 1983: Jan Merrill; 1984: Cathy Branta; 1985: Cathy Branta; 1986: Lynn Jennings; 1987: Maricica Puică (ROM), Lesley Lehane (2nd); 1988: Sabrina Dornhoefer; 1989: Elaine Van Blunk; 1990: Lynn Jennings; 1991: Margareta Keszeg (ROM), PattiSue Plumer (2nd); 1992: Shelly Steely
1993–present USA Track & Field	1993: Lynn Jennings; 1994: Kathy Fleming; 1995: Lynn Jennings; 1996: Joan Nesbit; 1997: Amy Rudolph; 1998: Elva Dryer; 1999: Regina Jacobs; 2000: Marla Runyan; 2001: Regina Jacobs; 2002: Amy Rudolph; 2003: Regina Jacobs; 2004: Shayne Culpepper; 2005: Shayne Culpepper; 2006: Carrie Tollefson; 2007: Shalane Flanagan; 2008: Shannon Rowbury; 2009: Amy Yoder Begley; 2010: Renee Metivier Baillie; 2011: Jenny Simpson; 2012: Jenny Simpson; 2013: Chelsea Sodaro; 2014: Gabriele Grunewald; 2015: Shannon Rowbury; 2016: Shannon Rowbury; 2017: Shelby Houlihan; 2018: Shelby Houlihan; 2019: Shelby Houlihan; 2020: Shelby Houlihan; 2022: Elle Purrier St. Pierre; 2023: Valerie Constien; 2024: Elle Purrier St. Pierre; 2025: Nikki Hiltz; 2026: Emily Mackay
Notes	*Distances have varied as follows: 2 Miles (1975–1986) and odd numbered years since 2015, 3000 meters (1987–2014) and even numbered years since 2014

==== 60 m hurdles (60 yards hurdles, 55 m hurdles, 50 m hurdles, 50 yards hurdles, 80 m hurdles, 70 yards hurdles) ====
USA Indoor Track and Field Championships winners in women's 60 m hurdles (60 yards hurdles, 55 m hurdles, 50 m hurdles, 50 yards hurdles, 80 m hurdles, 70 yards hurdles)
1927–1979 Amateur Athletic Union	1928: Mary Washburn; 1929: Catherine Donovan; 1930: Catherine Donovan; 1931: Evelyne Hall; 1932: Nellie Sharka; 1933: Evelyne Hall; 1934: Roxy Atkins (CAN), Evelyne Hall (2nd); 1935: Evelyne Hall; 1936: Tidye Pickett; 1937: Jane Santschi; 1941: Lillie Purifoy; 1945: Nancy Cowperthwaite-Phillips; 1946: Lillie Purifoy; 1948: Theresa Manuel; 1949: Bernice Robinson; 1950: Nancy Cowperthwaite-Phillips; 1951: Nancy Cowperthwaite-Phillips; 1952: Nancy Cowperthwaite-Phillips; 1953: Nancy Cowperthwaite-Phillips; 1954: Barbara Mueller; 1955: Nancy Cowperthwaite-Phillips; 1956: Constance Darnowski; 1957: Lauretta Foley; 1958: Shirley Crowder; 1959: Jo Ann Terry; 1960: Jo Ann Terry; 1961: Jo Ann Terry; 1962: Jo Ann Terry; 1963: Janell Smith; 1964: Jenny Meldrum (CAN), Mary Rose (2nd); 1965: Chi Cheng (TPE), Tamara Davis (3rd); 1966: Chi Cheng (TPE), Cherrie Sherrard (2nd); 1967: Patty Van Wolvelaere; 1968: Patty Van Wolvelaere; 1969: Mamie Rallins; 1970: Chi Cheng (TPE), Patty Van Wolvelaere (2nd); 1971: Patty Van Wolvelaere; 1972: Patty Van Wolvelaere; 1973: Patty Van Wolvelaere; 1974: Patty Van Wolvelaere; 1975: Modupe Oshikoya (NGR), Deby LaPlante (2nd); 1976: Deby LaPlante; 1977: Jane Frederick; 1978: Deby LaPlante; 1979: Candy Young
1980–1992 The Athletics Congress	1980: Stephanie Hightower; 1981: Benita Fitzgerald-Brown; 1982: Stephanie Hightower; 1983: Stephanie Hightower; 1984: Stephanie Hightower; 1985: Candy Young; 1986: Stephanie Hightower; 1987: Cornelia Oschkenat (GDR), Jackie Joyner-Kersee (3rd); 1988: Julie Baumann (CAN), Lynda Tolbert-Goode (2nd); 1989: Kim Turner; 1990: LaVonna Martin; 1991: Kim Turner; 1992: Jackie Joyner-Kersee
1993–present USA Track & Field	1993: Michelle Freeman (JAM), LaVonna Martin (2nd); 1994: Michelle Freeman (JAM), LaVonna Martin (2nd); 1995: Lynda Tolbert-Goode; 1996: Michelle Freeman (JAM), Tonya Lawson (2nd); 1997: Cheryl Dickey; 1998: Melissa Morrison-Howard; 1999: Melissa Morrison-Howard; 2000: Melissa Morrison-Howard; 2001: Anjanette Kirkland; 2002: Melissa Morrison-Howard; 2003: Gail Devers; 2004: Gail Devers; 2005: Danielle Carruthers; 2006: Danielle Carruthers; 2007: Lolo Jones; 2008: Lolo Jones; 2009: Lolo Jones; 2010: Ginnie Crawford; 2011: Kellie Wells; 2012: Kristi Castlin; 2013: Nia Ali; 2014: Nia Ali; 2015: Jasmin Stowers; 2016: Brianna Rollins-McNeal; 2017: Kendra Harrison; 2018: Sharika Nelvis; 2019: Sharika Nelvis; 2020: Gabbi Cunningham; 2022: Gabbi Cunningham; 2023: Alaysha Johnson; 2024: Tia Jones
Notes	* Distances have varied as follows: 60 yards hurdles (1965-86), 55 m hurdles (1987-90), 50 m hurdles (1933-41, 1948), 50 yards hurdles (1928-32, 1945-46, 1949-54, 1957-58, 1964), 80 m hurdles (1955), 70 yards hurdles (1956, 1959-63). From 1965-68, there were 4 hurdles instead of 5 hurdles other years.

==== Racewalking (mile walk, 3000 m, 5000 m walk) ====
USA Indoor Track and Field Championships winners in women's racewalking (mile walk, 3000 m walk, 2 miles walk, 5000 m walk)
Mile walk	1973: Lynn Olson; 1974: Sue Brodock; 1975: Sue Brodock; 1976: Sue Brodock; 1977: Sue Brodock; 1978: Sue Brodock; 1979: Chris Shea; 1980: Sue Brodock; 1981: Sue Liers; 1982: Sue Brodock; 1983: Sue Brodock; 1984: Teresa Vaill; 1985: Teresa Vaill; 1986: Teresa Vaill; 2005: Jolene Moore; 2006: Jolene Moore
3000 m walk (2 miles walk)	1987: Maryanne Torrellas; 1988: Maryanne Torrellas; 1989: Teresa Vaill; 1990: Teresa Vaill; 1991: Teresa Vaill; 1992: Debbi Lawrence; 1993: Debbi Lawrence; 1994: Debbi Lawrence; 1995: Michelle Rohl; 1996: Michelle Rohl; 1997: Debbi Lawrence; 1998: Michelle Rohl; 1999: Joanne Dow; 2000: Michelle Rohl; 2001: Michelle Rohl; 2002: Joanne Dow; 2003: Joanne Dow; 2004: Joanne Dow; 2005: Amber Antonia; 2006: Joanne Dow; 2007: Sam Cohen; 2008: Teresa Vaill; 2009: Joanne Dow; 2010: Maria Michta-Coffey; 2011: Maria Michta-Coffey; 2012: Maria Michta-Coffey; 2013: Maria Michta-Coffey; 2015: Maria Michta-Coffey; 2016: Maria Michta-Coffey; 2017: Maria Michta-Coffey; 2018: Maria Michta-Coffey; 2019: Miranda Melville; 2020: Robyn Stevens; 2023: Miranda Melville; 2024: Miranda Melville; 2025: Lauren Harris
5000 m walk	2026: Lauren Harris
Notes	* From 1973 to 1979, events were conducted by the Amateur Athletic Union. Events from 1980 to 1992 were conducted under The Athletics Congress. Events thereafter were conducted by USA Track & Field. 2 miles walk was contested in 2015 and 2017 in place of 3000 m walk.

=== Field ===
==== High jump ====
USA Indoor Track and Field Championships winners in women's high jump
1927–1979 Amateur Athletic Union	1927: Mildred Wiley; 1928: Mildred Wiley; 1929: Jean Shiley; 1930: Jean Shiley; 1931: Jean Shiley; 1932: Jean Shiley; 1933: Annette Rogers; 1934: Alice Arden; 1935: Alice Arden; 1936: Annette Rogers; 1937: Loretta Murphy; 1941: Alice Coachman; 1945: Alice Coachman; 1946: Alice Coachman; 1948: Emma Reed; 1949: Nancy Cowperthwaite-Phillips; 1950: Marion Boos; 1951: Marion Boos, Nancy Cowperthwaite-Phillips; 1952: Marion Boos; 1953: Marion Boos; 1954: Barbara Mueller; 1955: Mildred McDaniel; 1956: Mildred McDaniel; 1957: Ann Marie Flynn; 1958: Barbara Brown, Ann Marie Flynn; 1959: Ann Marie Flynn; 1960: Darlene Everhart; 1961: Rose Robinson; 1962: Estelle Baskerville; 1963: Eleanor Montgomery; 1964: Eleanor Montgomery; 1965: Iolanda Balaș (ROM), Eleanor Montgomery (2nd); 1966: Eleanor Montgomery; 1967: Eleanor Montgomery; 1968: Eleanor Montgomery; 1969: Eleanor Montgomery; 1970: Debbie Brill (CAN), Vann Abram (3rd); 1971: Snežana Hrepevnik (YUG), Sally Pihal (3rd); 1972: Debbie Van Kiekebelt (CAN), Alice Pfaff (2nd); 1973: Alice Pfaff; 1974: Joni Huntley; 1975: Joni Huntley; 1976: Julie White (CAN), Pam Spencer (2nd); 1977: Joni Huntley; 1978: Debbie Brill (CAN), Joni Huntley (2nd); 1979: Louise Ritter
1980–1992 The Athletics Congress	1980: Louise Ritter; 1981: Joni Huntley; 1982: Coleen Sommer; 1983: Louise Ritter; 1984: Tamara Bykova (URS), Joni Huntley (2nd); 1985: Coleen Sommer; 1986: Debbie Brill (CAN), Joni Huntley (3rd); 1987: Tamara Bykova (URS), Rita Graves (4th); 1988: Louise Ritter; 1989: Louise Ritter; 1990: Jan Wohlschlag; 1991: Yolanda Henry; 1992: Angela Bradburn-Spangler
1993–present USA Track & Field	1993: Yolanda Henry; 1994: Angela Bradburn-Spangler; 1995: Gwen Wentland; 1996: Tisha Waller; 1997: Angela Bradburn-Spangler; 1998: Tisha Waller; 1999: Tisha Waller; 2000: Tisha Waller; 2001: Amy Acuff; 2002: Tisha Waller; 2003: Tisha Waller; 2004: Amy Acuff; 2005: Gwen Wentland; 2006: Chaunté Lowe; 2007: Amy Acuff; 2008: Amy Acuff; 2009: Amy Acuff; 2010: Chaunté Lowe; 2011: Epley Bullock; 2012: Chaunté Lowe; 2013: Inika McPherson; 2014: Inika McPherson; 2015: Chaunté Lowe; 2016: Vashti Cunningham; 2017: Vashti Cunningham; 2018: Vashti Cunningham; 2019: Vashti Cunningham; 2020: Vashti Cunningham; 2022: Vashti Cunningham; 2023: Vashti Cunningham; 2024: Vashti Cunningham; 2025: Vashti Cunningham; 2026: Charity Hufnagel

==== Long jump (standing long jump) ====
USA Indoor Track and Field Championships winners in women's long jump (Standing long jump)
1927–1979 Amateur Athletic Union	1927: Katherine Mearls; 1928: Katherine Mearls; 1929: Katherine Mearls; 1930: Katherine Mearls; 1931: Katherine Mearls; 1932: Kay Ungenach; 1933: Dorothy Lyford; 1934: Dorothy Lyford; 1935: Helen Stephens; 1936: Helen Stephens; 1937: Claire Isicson; 1941: Lucy Newell; 1945: Clara Schroth; 1946: Lorraine Boeson; 1948: Nancy Cowperthwaite-Phillips; 1949: Nancy Cowperthwaite-Phillips; 1950: Nancy Cowperthwaite-Phillips; 1951: Janet Moreau; 1952: Janet Moreau; 1953: Janet Moreau; 1954: Cynthia Lane; 1955: Shirley Hereford; 1956: Nancy Cowperthwaite-Phillips; 1957: Shirley Hereford; 1958: Shirley Hereford; 1959: Jo Ann Terry; 1960: Sandra Smith; 1961: Sandra Smith; 1962: Willye White; 1963: Edith McGuire; 1964: Beverly Beckwith; 1965: Mary Rand (GBR), Martha Watson (3rd); 1966: Chi Cheng (TPE), Willye White (2nd); 1967: Martha Watson; 1968: Tatyana Talysheva (URS), Martha Watson (2nd); 1969: Irena Szewińska (POL), Martha Watson (4th); 1970: Chi Cheng (TPE), Willye White (2nd); 1971: Marilyn King; 1972: Martha Watson; 1973: Irena Szewińska (POL), Martha Watson (2nd); 1974: Martha Watson; 1975: Martha Watson; 1976: Martha Watson; 1977: Kathy McMillan; 1978: Modupe Oshikoya (NGR), Kathy McMillan (2nd); 1979: Kathy McMillan
1980–1992 The Athletics Congress	1980: Pat Johnson; 1981: Ana Alexander (CUB), Carol Lewis (2nd); 1982: Veronica Bell; 1983: Carol Lewis; 1984: Carol Lewis; 1985: Carol Lewis; 1986: Heike Drechsler (GDR), Jackie Joyner-Kersee (2nd); 1987: Heike Drechsler (GDR), Carol Lewis (3rd); 1988: Sheila Echols; 1989: Jennifer Innis; 1990: Jacinta Bartholomew (GRN), Lashawn Simmons (2nd); 1991: Carol Lewis; 1992: Jackie Joyner-Kersee
1993–present USA Track & Field	1993: Christy Opara-Thompson (NGR), Sharon Couch (2nd); 1994: Jackie Joyner-Kersee; 1995: Jackie Joyner-Kersee; 1996: Shana Williams; 1997: Dawn Burrell; 1998: Dawn Burrell; 1999: Shana Williams; 2000: Adrien Sawyer; 2001: Dawn Burrell; 2002: Grace Upshaw; 2003: Kiamesha Otey; 2004: Tameisha King; 2005: Rose Richmond; 2006: Akiba McKinney; 2007: Akiba McKinney; 2008: Hyleas Fountain; 2009: Brittney Reese; 2010: Brittney Reese; 2011: Janay DeLoach Soukup; 2012: Janay DeLoach Soukup; 2013: Janay DeLoach Soukup; 2014: Tori Polk; 2015: Funmi Jimoh; 2016: Brittney Reese; 2017: Erica Bougard; 2018: Brittney Reese; 2019: Kate Hall; 2020: Quanesha Burks; 2022: Quanesha Burks; 2023: Rhesa Foster; 2024: Tara Davis-Woodhall
Notes	* Standing long jump was contested from 1927-61 and in 1964. An exhibition running long jump was held in 1948, also won by Cowperthwaite-Phillips.

==== Triple jump ====
USA Indoor Track and Field Championships winners in women's triple jump
1980–1992 The Athletics Congress	1991: Juliana Yendork; 1992: Claudia Haywood
1993–present USA Track & Field	1993: Sheila Hudson; 1994: Sheila Hudson; 1995: Sheila Hudson; 1996: Sheila Hudson; 1997: Cynthea Rhodes; 1998: Niambi Dennis; 1999: Cynthea Rhodes; 2000: Tiombe Hurd; 2001: Tiombe Hurd; 2002: Vanitta Kinard; 2003: Vanitta Kinard; 2004: Tiombe Hurd; 2005: Shani Marks; 2006: Tiombe Hurd; 2007: Shani Marks; 2008: Shakeema Welsch; 2009: Shakeema Welsch; 2010: Erica McLain; 2011: Shakeema Welsch; 2012: Amanda Smock; 2013: Amanda Smock; 2014: Amanda Smock; 2015: Amanda Smock; 2016: Christina Epps; 2017: Tori Franklin; 2018: Tori Franklin; 2019: Keturah Orji; 2020: Tori Franklin; 2022: Keturah Orji; 2023: Keturah Orji; 2024: Keturah Orji

==== Pole vault ====
USA Indoor Track and Field Championships winners in women's pole vault
- 1995: Melissa Price
- 1996: Stacy Dragila
- 1997: Stacy Dragila
- 1998: Stacy Dragila
- 1999: Stacy Dragila
- 2000: Stacy Dragila
- 2001: Stacy Dragila
- 2002: Mary Sauer
- 2003: Stacy Dragila
- 2004: Stacy Dragila
- 2005: Jenn Suhr
- 2006: Kellie Suttle
- 2007: Jenn Suhr
- 2008: Jenn Suhr
- 2009: Jenn Suhr
- 2010: Lacy Janson
- 2011: Jenn Suhr
- 2012: Jenn Suhr
- 2013: Jenn Suhr
- 2014: Mary Saxer
- 2015: Demi Payne
- 2016: Sandi Morris
- 2017: Sandi Morris
- 2018: Katie Moon
- 2019: Katie Moon
- 2020: Sandi Morris
- 2022: Sandi Morris
- 2023: Katie Moon
- 2024: Katie Moon
- 2025: Katie Moon
- 2026: Chloe Timberg

==== Shot put ====
USA Indoor Track and Field Championships winners in women's shot put
1927–1979 Amateur Athletic Union	1927: Rena MacDonald; 1928: Mabel Travers; 1929: Rena MacDonald; 1930: Rena MacDonald; 1931: Rena MacDonald; 1932: Rena MacDonald; 1933: Rena MacDonald; 1934: Rena MacDonald; 1935: Helen Stephens; 1936: Helen Stephens; 1937: Helen Stephens; 1941: Dorothy Dodson; 1945: Dorothy Dodson; 1946: Dorothy Dodson; 1948: Frances Kaszubski; 1949: Ramona Massey; 1950: Amelia Wood; 1951: Frances Kaszubski; 1952: Amelia Wood; 1953: Amelia Wood; 1954: Paula Deubel; 1955: Lois Testa; 1956: Adele Tischler (TCH), Lois Testa (3rd); 1957: Marjorie Larney; 1958: Earlene Brown; 1959: Marjorie Larney; 1960: Sharon Shepherd; 1961: Cynthia Wyatt; 1962: Sharon Shepherd; 1963: Cynthia Wyatt; 1964: Sharon Shepherd; 1965: Tamara Press (URS), Lynn Graham (2nd); 1966: Joan Whitehead; 1967: Lynn Graham; 1968: Maren Seidler; 1969: Maren Seidler; 1970: Mary Jacobson; 1971: Lynette Matthews; 1972: Maren Seidler; 1973: Jan Svendsen; 1974: Maren Seidler; 1975: Faina Melnik (URS), Maren Seidler (2nd); 1976: Ann Turbyne; 1977: Maren Seidler; 1978: Maren Seidler; 1979: Beatrix Philipp (FRG), Maren Seidler (2nd)
1980–1992 The Athletics Congress	1980: Maren Seidler; 1981: Marita Walton (IRL), Denise Wood (2nd); 1982: Marita Walton (IRL), Denise Wood (2nd); 1983: Ria Stalman (NED), Denise Wood (2nd); 1984: Meg Ritchie (GBR), Regina Cavanaugh (2nd); 1985: Bonnie Dasse; 1986: Ramona Pagel; 1987: Ilona Slupianek (GDR), Ramona Pagel (2nd); 1988: Ramona Pagel; 1989: Ramona Pagel; 1990: Ramona Pagel; 1991: Connie Price-Smith; 1992: Connie Price-Smith
1993–present USA Track & Field	1993: Connie Price-Smith; 1994: Ramona Pagel; 1995: Ramona Pagel; 1996: Connie Price-Smith; 1997: Valeyta Althouse; 1998: Connie Price-Smith; 1999: Teri Steer; 2000: Connie Price-Smith; 2001: Connie Price-Smith; 2002: Teri Steer; 2003: Kristin Heaston; 2004: Laura Gerraughty; 2005: Jillian Camarena-Williams; 2006: Jillian Camarena-Williams; 2007: Jillian Camarena-Williams; 2008: Jillian Camarena-Williams; 2009: Jillian Camarena-Williams; 2010: Jillian Camarena-Williams; 2011: Jillian Camarena-Williams; 2012: Jillian Camarena-Williams; 2013: Michelle Carter; 2014: Michelle Carter; 2015: Michelle Carter; 2016: Michelle Carter; 2017: Michelle Carter; 2018: Daniella Hill; 2019: Chase Jackson; 2020: Chase Jackson; 2022: Maggie Ewen; 2023: Chase Jackson; 2024: Chase Jackson
Notes	* Shot put was 8 pounds (3.6 kg) from 1927 to 1954, after which it was 4 kilograms (8.8 lb).

==== Weight throw ====
USA Indoor Track and Field Championships winners in women's 20-lb weight throw
1989: Virginia Young; 1990: Virginia Young; 1991: Sonja Fitts; 1992: Sonja Fitts; 1993: Sonja Fitts; 1994: Sonja Fitts; 1995: Sonja Fitts; 1996: Dawn Ellerbe; 1997: Dawn Ellerbe; 1998: Dawn Ellerbe; 1999: Dawn Ellerbe; 2000: Dawn Ellerbe; 2001: Dawn Ellerbe; 2002: Anna Mahon; 2003: Anna Mahon; 2004: Erin Gilreath; 2005: Erin Gilreath; 2006: Erin Gilreath; 2007: Amber Campbell; 2008: Amber Campbell; 2009: Amber Campbell; 2010: Amber Campbell; 2011: Amber Campbell; 2012: Amber Campbell; 2013: Gwen Berry; 2014: Gwen Berry; 2015: Felisha Johnson; 2016: Gwen Berry; 2017: Gwen Berry; 2018: DeAnna Price; 2019: Janeah Stewart; 2020: Janeah Stewart; 2022: Janee' Kassanavoid; 2023: DeAnna Price; 2024: Erin Reese
Notes	Events from 1989 to 1992 were conducted under The Athletics Congress. Events thereafter were conducted by USA Track & Field.

==== Pentathlon ====
USA Indoor Track and Field Championships winners in women's pentathlon
- 1995: Kym Carter
- 1996: Marla Runyan
- 2003: Tiffany Lott-Hogan
- 2004: Tiffany Lott-Hogan
- 2005: Hyleas Fountain
- 2006: Lela Nelson
- 2007: Fiona Asigbee
- 2008: Diana Pickler
- 2009: Diana Pickler
- 2010: Diana Pickler
- 2011: Bettie Wade
- 2012: Sharon Day-Monroe
- 2013: Sharon Day-Monroe
- 2014: Sharon Day-Monroe
- 2015: Sharon Day-Monroe
- 2016: Barbara Nwaba
- 2017: Erica Bougard
- 2018: Erica Bougard
- 2019: Kendell Williams
- 2020: Annie Kunz
- 2022: Chari Hawkins
- 2023: Anna Hall
- 2024: Cheyenne Nesbitt
- 2025: Timara Chapman
- 2026: Anna Hall

=== Discontinued events ===
==== 100 m (100 yards) ====
Event was 100 yards except for 1955.

- 1950: Jean Patton
- 1951: Jean Patton
- 1952: Mae Faggs
- 1953: Cynthia Robinson
- 1954: Barbara Jones
- 1955: Barbara Jones
- 1956: Isabelle Daniels
- 1957: Barbara Jones
- 1958: Barbara Jones
- 1959: Martha Hudson
- 1960: Wilma Rudolph
- 1961: Wilma Rudolph
- 1962: Willye White
- 1963: Edith Maguire
- 1964: Willye White

==== 200 m (220 yards, 200 yards, 240 yards) ====
USA Indoor Track and Field Championships winners in women's 200 m (220 yards, 200 yards, 240 yards)
1927–1979 Amateur Athletic Union	1928: Irene Moran; 1929: Catherine Donovan; 1930: Stanisława Walasiewicz (POL), Catherine Capp (2nd); 1931: Stanisława Walasiewicz (POL), Catherine Capp (2nd); 1932: Catherine Capp; 1933: Annette Rogers; 1934: Stanisława Walasiewicz (POL), Annette Rogers (2nd); 1935: Stanisława Walasiewicz (POL), Mary Jane Santschi (2nd); 1936: Annette Rogers; 1937: Helen Stephens; 1941: Jean Lane; 1945: Stanisława Walasiewicz (POL), Nell Jackson (2nd); 1946: Stanisława Walasiewicz (POL), Juanita Watson (2nd); 1948: Audrey Patterson; 1949: Mae Faggs; 1950: Mae Faggs; 1951: Mae Faggs; 1952: Mae Faggs; 1953: Janet Moreau; 1954: Mae Faggs; 1955: Alfrances Lyman; 1956: Mae Faggs; 1957: Lucinda Williams; 1958: Isabelle Daniels; 1959: Lucinda Williams; 1960: Wilma Rudolph; 1961: Vivian Brown; 1962: Vivian Brown; 1963: Marilyn White; 1964: Valerie Carter; 1965: Edith McGuire; 1966: Edith McGuire; 1967: Una Morris (JAM), Kathy Hammond (2nd); 1968: Vilma Charlton (JAM), Nancy Beeson (2nd); 1969: Barbara Ferrell; 1970: Diane Kummer; 1971: Esther Stroy; 1972: Esther Stroy; 1973: Rosalyn Bryant; 1974: Linda Cordy, Theresa Montgomery; 1975: Rosalyn Bryant; 1976: Pamela Jiles; 1977: Rosalyn Bryant; 1978: Freida Nichols (BAR), Theresa Montgomery (2nd); 1979: Chandra Cheeseborough
1980–1992 The Athletics Congress	1980: Wanda Hooker; 1981: Chandra Cheeseborough; 1982: Chandra Cheeseborough; 1983: Chandra Cheeseborough; 1984: Valerie Brisco-Hooks; 1985: Valerie Brisco-Hooks; 1986: Marita Koch (GDR), Grace Jackson (2nd); 1987: Grace Jackson (JAM), Valerie Brisco-Hooks (2nd); 1988: Grace Jackson (JAM), Terri Dendy (3rd); 1989: Alice Jackson; 1990: Grace Jackson (JAM), Lamonda Miller (3rd); 1991: Rochelle Stevens; 1992: Dyan Webber
1993–present USA Track & Field	1993: Rochelle Stevens; 1994: Gwen Torrence; 1995: Carlette Guidry-White; 1996: Gwen Torrence; 1997: Tameka Roberts; 1998: Tameka Roberts; 1999: Zundra Feagin-Alexander; 2000: Nanceen Parry; 2001: LaTasha Jenkins; 2002: Willisa Heintz; 2003: Allyson Felix; 2004: Crystal Cox
Notes	* Distances have varied as follows: 220 yards (1928-32, 1945-46, 1949-64, 1966-68, 1970-86), 200 yards (1965), 240 yards (1967).

==== 600 m ====
- 2015: Alysia Montaño
- 2017: Ajeé Wilson
- 2019: Athing Mu

==== Discus throw ====
- 1955: Marjorie Larney

==== Javelin throw ====
- 1955: Amelia Wershoven

==== Basketball throw ====
USA Indoor Track and Field Championships winners in women's basketball throw
- 1927: Eleanor Churchill
- 1929: Marietta Ceres
- 1930: Gertrude Mayer
- 1931: Carolyn Dieckman
- 1932: Carolyn Dieckman
- 1933: Nan Gindele
- 1934: Nan Gindele
- 1935: Stanisława Walasiewicz (POL), Nan Gindele (2nd)
- 1936: Nan Gindele
- 1937: Evelyn Ferrara
- 1941: Marian Barone
- 1945: Marian Barone
- 1946: Marian Barone
- 1948: Stella Gorka
- 1949: Ottilie Barth
- 1950: Ottilie Barth
- 1951: Marian Barone
- 1952: Elizabeth Cipolt
- 1953: Ramona Massey
- 1954: Catherine Walsh
- 1955: Amelia Wood
- 1956: Catherine Walsh
- 1957: Amelia Wood
- 1958: Earlene Brown
- 1959: Amelia Wood
- 1960: Cecilia Rutledge
- 1961: Jean Hofbauer
- 1962: Cynthia Wyatt
- 1963: Linda DeLong
- 1964: Shirley McCondichie
- 1965: Barbara Friedrich
- 1966: Barbara Friedrich
- 1967: Barbara Friedrich
- 1968: Barbara Friedrich
- 1969: Mary Boron
