= 1935 USA Indoor Track and Field Championships =

National athletics championship event

- Dates: February 23 (men); March 22 (women)
- Host city: New York City, New York, United States (men); St. Louis, Missouri, United States (women)
- Venue: Madison Square Garden (men); St. Louis Coliseum (women)
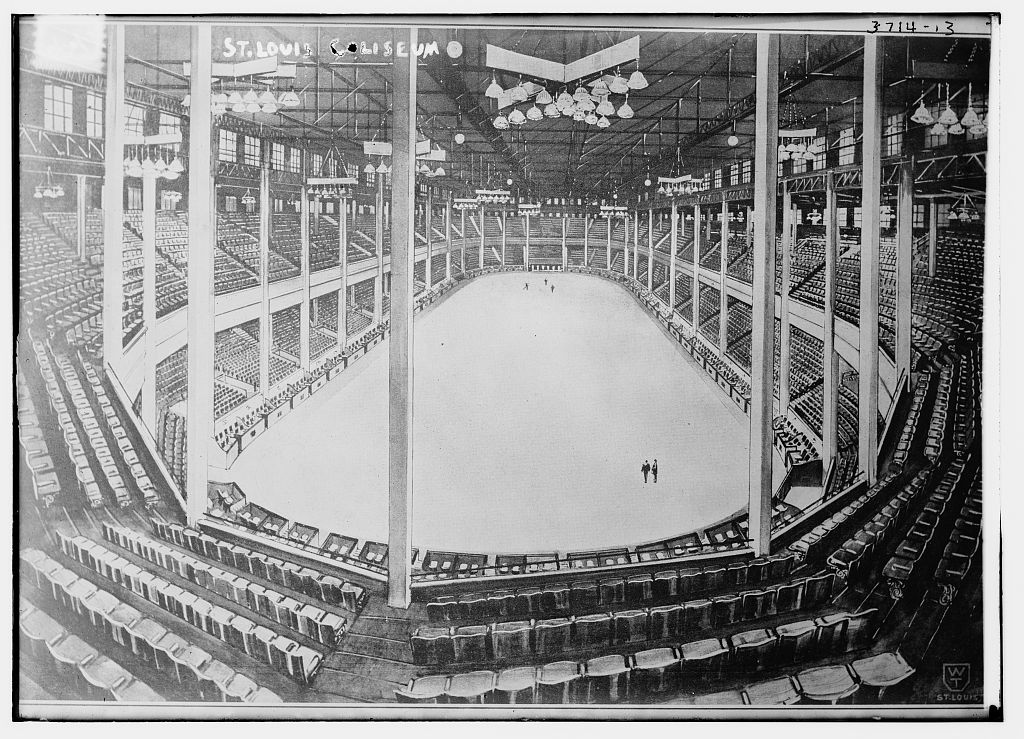
- Level: Senior
- Type: Indoor
- Events: 19 (13 men's + 6 women's)

The 1935 USA Indoor Track and Field Championships were organized by the Amateur Athletic Union (AAU) and served as the national championships in indoor track and field for the United States.

The men's edition was held at Madison Square Garden in New York City, New York, and it took place February 23. The women's meet was held separately at the St. Louis Coliseum in St. Louis, Missouri, taking place March 22.

At the championships, high schooler Helen Stephens upset pre-race favorite Stella Walsh in the 50 metres. Stephens had reportedly only began training ten days before the championships. About 3,500 spectators attended the women's meet with most coming to see Walsh run.

== Medal summary ==
=== Men ===
Event	Gold		Silver	Bronze
60 m	Ben Johnson	6.6		
600 m	Milton Sandler	1:21.9		
1000 m	Glen Dawson	2:30.0		
1500 m	Glenn Cunningham	3:50.5		
5000 m	John Follows	15:18.8		
65 m hurdles	Percy Beard	8.6		
3000 m steeplechase (Note: Run without a water jump.)	Joe McCluskey	9:07.1		
High jump	Cornelius Johnson	2.01 m		
Pole vault	Ray Lowry	4.06 m		
Pole vault	Eldon Stutzman	4.06 m		
Pole vault	Oscar Sutermeister	4.06 m		
Long jump	Jesse Owens	7.84 m		
Shot put	Jack Torrance	15.11 m		
Weight throw	Henry Dreyer	16.86 m		
1500 m walk	Henry Cieman (CAN)	6:07.3	Charles Eschenbach	

=== Women ===
Event	Gold		Silver	Bronze
50 m	Helen Stephens	6.6		
200 m	Stella Walsh (POL)	26.1	Mary Jane Santschi	
50 m hurdles	Evelyne Hall	8.1		
High jump	Alice Arden	1.52 m		
Standing long jump	Helen Stephens	2.64 m		
Shot put	Helen Stephens	12.07 m		
Basketball throw	Stella Walsh (POL)	96 ft 5 1/2 in (29.4 m)	Nan Gindele	
