= 1936 USA Indoor Track and Field Championships =

National athletics championship event

- Dates: February 22 (men); February 12 (women)
- Host city: New York City, New York, United States (men); St. Louis, Missouri, United States (women)
- Venue: Madison Square Garden (men); St. Louis Coliseum (women)
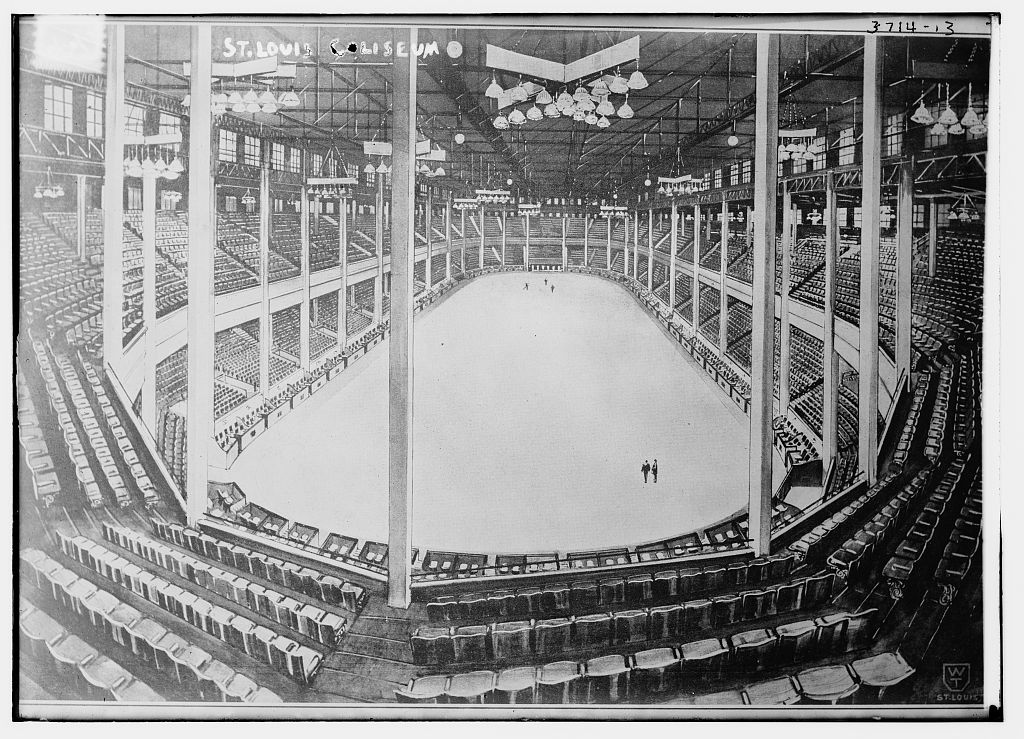
- Level: Senior
- Type: Indoor
- Events: 20 (13 men's + 7 women's)

The 1936 USA Indoor Track and Field Championships were organized by the Amateur Athletic Union (AAU) and served as the national championships in indoor track and field for the United States.

The men's edition was held at Madison Square Garden in New York City, New York, and it took place February 22. The women's meet was held separately at the St. Louis Coliseum in St. Louis, Missouri, taking place February 12.

At the women's championships, the "Fulton Flash" Helen Stephens broke the U.S. record in the 50 meters. About 1,000 spectators attended the women's meet despite inclement weather.

== Medal summary ==
=== Men ===
| Event | Gold | | Silver | | Bronze |
|---|---|---|---|---|---|
| 60 m | Ralph Metcalfe | 6.7 | | | |
| 600 m | Edward O'Brien | 1:21.0 | | | |
| 1000 m | Charles Hornbostel | 2:29.0 | | | |
| 1500 m | Gene Venzke | 3:49.9 | | | |
| 5000 m | Norman Bright | 15:00.0 | | | |
| 65 m hurdles | Sam Allen | 8.7 | | | |
| 3000 m steeplechase (Note: Run without a water jump) | Joe McCluskey | 8:57.1 | | | |
| High jump | Ed Burke | 2.05 m | | | |
| Pole vault | David Hunn | 4.14 m | | | |
| Long jump | Sam Richardson (CAN) | 7.39 m | Ed Gordon | 22 ft 11 in (6.98 m) | |
| Shot put | Dimitri Zaitz | 15.86 m | | | |
| Weight throw | Irving Folwartshny | 17.71 m | | | |
| 1500 m walk | Charles Eschenbach | 6:18.1 | | | |

=== Women ===
| Event | Gold | | Silver | Bronze |
|---|---|---|---|---|
| 50 m | Helen Stephens | 6.4 | | |
| 200 m | Annette Rogers | 27.9 | | |
| 50 m hurdles | Tidye Pickett | 7.9 | | |
| High jump | Annette Rogers | 1.56 m | | |
| Standing long jump | Helen Stephens | 2.55 m | | |
| Shot put | Helen Stephens | 12.67 m | | |
| Basketball throw | Nan Gindele | 94 ft 4 3/4 in (28.77 m) | | |
