= 1933 USA Indoor Track and Field Championships =

National athletics championship event

- Dates: February 25
- Host city: New York City, New York, United States (men); New York City, New York, United States (women)
- Venue: Madison Square Garden
- Level: Senior
- Type: Indoor
- Events: 21 (14 men's + 7 women's)

The 1933 USA Indoor Track and Field Championships were organized by the Amateur Athletic Union (AAU) and served as the national championships in indoor track and field for the United States.

The championships were held at Madison Square Garden in New York City, New York, taking place February 25.

The women's meet was held at the same venue and date as a "preliminary" to the men's contests. It would be the only time that the men's and women's championships were held together until the 1965 edition. At the championships, Gene Venzke won the feature men's 1500 m. He ran shoulder-to-shoulder with Glenn Cunningham for the final two laps, and both fell across the finish line. About 15,000 spectators attended the men's meet.

== Medal summary ==
=== Men ===
Event	Gold		Silver	Bronze
60 m	Ralph Metcalfe	6.7		
600 m	Milton Sandler	1:25.6		
1000 m	Glen Dawson	2:27.4		
1500 m	Gene Venzke	3:55.4		
5000 m	George Lermond	15:08.8		
65 m hurdles	Percy Beard	8.6		
3000 m steeplechase (Note: For the indoor steeplechase, barriers were used but there was no water pit.)	Joe McCluskey	9:01.1		
High jump	George Spitz	2.04 m		
Pole vault	Keith Brown	4.11 m		
Pole vault	Frank Pierce	4.11 m		
Long jump	Theodore Smith	7.29 m		
Shot put	Leo Sexton	15.45 m		
Weight throw	Mort Reznick	15.49 m		
1500 m walk	William Carlson	6:15.8		

=== Women ===
Event	Gold		Silver	Bronze
50 m	Pearl Young	6.8		
200 m	Annette Rogers	26.8		
50 m hurdles	Evelyne Hall	7.6		
High jump	Annette Rogers	1.55 m		
Standing long jump	Dorothy Lyford	2.61 m		
Shot put	Margaret "Rena" MacDonald	11.53 m		
Basketball throw	Nan Gindele	101 ft 6 3/4 in (30.95 m)		
