= 1960 USA Indoor Track and Field Championships =

National athletics championship event

- Dates: February 20 (men); April 16 (women)
- Host city: New York City, New York, United States (men); Chicago, Illinois, United States (women)
- Venue: Madison Square Garden (men); Henry Crown Field House (women)
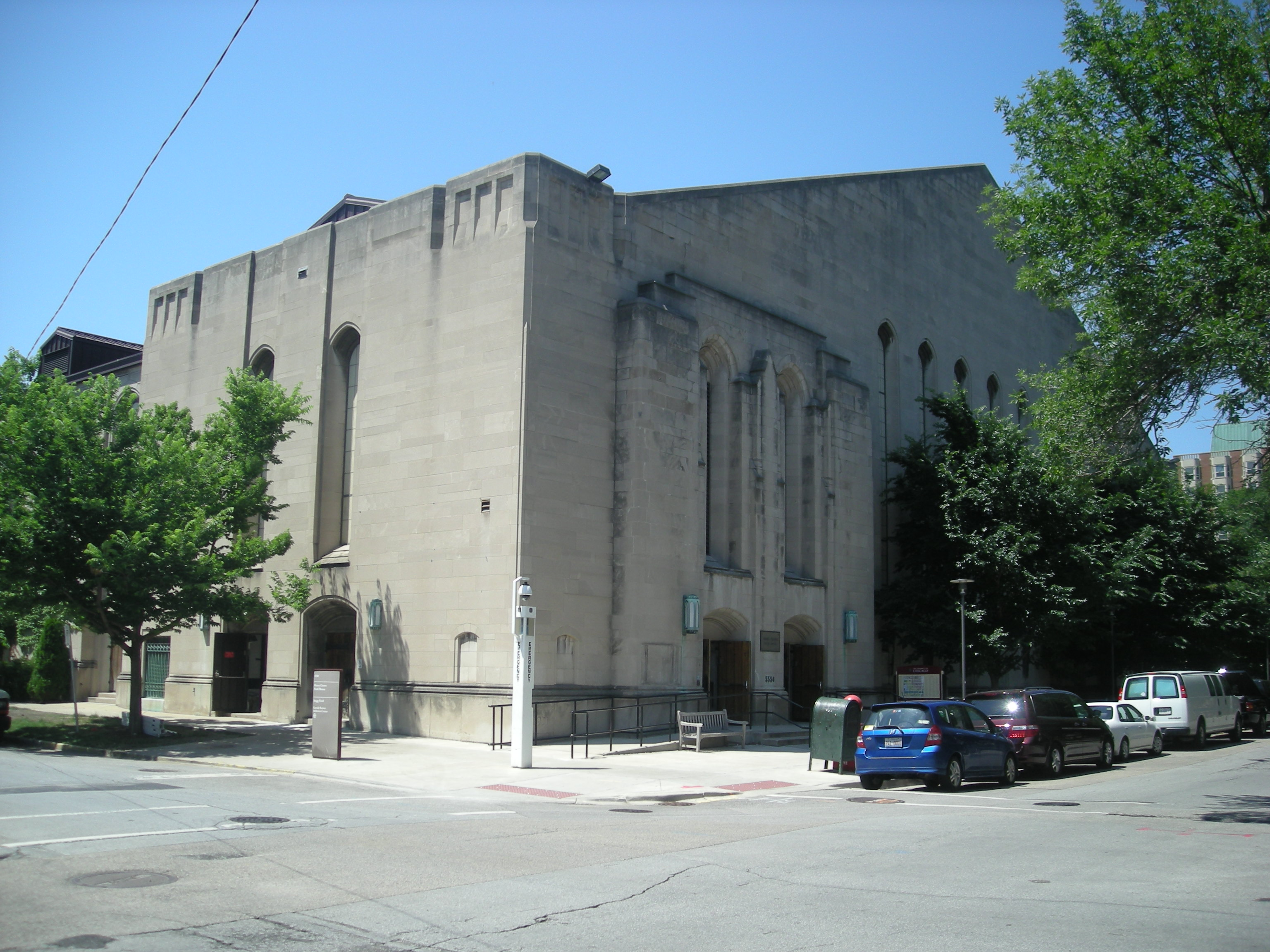
- Level: Senior
- Type: Indoor
- Events: 20 (12 men's + 8 women's)

The 1960 USA Indoor Track and Field Championships were organized by the Amateur Athletic Union (AAU) and served as the national championships in indoor track and field for the United States.

The men's edition was held at Madison Square Garden in New York City, New York, and it took place February 20. The women's meet was held separately at the Henry Crown Field House in Chicago, Illinois, taking place April 16.

At the women's championships, six women's records fell. At the men's meet, Irvin Roberson broke Jesse Owens's longstanding long jump record.

== Medal summary ==
=== Men ===
Event	Gold		Silver	Bronze
60 yards	Paul Winder	6.2		
600 yards	Tom Murphy	1:11.7		
1000 yards	Cary Weisiger	2:12.8		
Mile run	Phil Coleman	4:09.0		
3 miles	Al Lawrence (AUS)	13:26.4	Lew Stieglitz	
60 yards hurdles	Hayes Jones	7.1		
High jump	John Thomas	2.18 m		
Pole vault	Don Bragg	4.70 m		
Long jump	Irvin "Bo" Roberson	7.86 m		
Shot put	Parry O'Brien	18.79 m		
Weight throw	Hal Connolly	21.70 m		
1 mile walk	Frank Sipos (HUN)	6:27.4	Jack Blackburn	

=== Women ===
Event	Gold		Silver	Bronze
50 yards	Wilma Rudolph	5.9		
100 yards	Wilma Rudolph	10.7		
220 yards	Wilma Rudolph	25.7		
440 yards	Rose Lovelace	62.1		
880 yards	Grace Butcher	2:26.8		
70 yards hurdles	Jo Ann Terry	9.5		
High jump	Darlene Everhart	1.61 m		
Standing long jump	Sandra Smith	2.83 m		
Shot put	Sharon Sheppard	13.81 m		
Basketball throw	Cecilia Rutledge	120 ft 10 1/2 in (36.84 m)		
