= 1966 USA Indoor Track and Field Championships =

National athletics championship event

- Dates: March 4-5
- Host city: Albuquerque, New Mexico, United States
- Venue: Tingley Coliseum
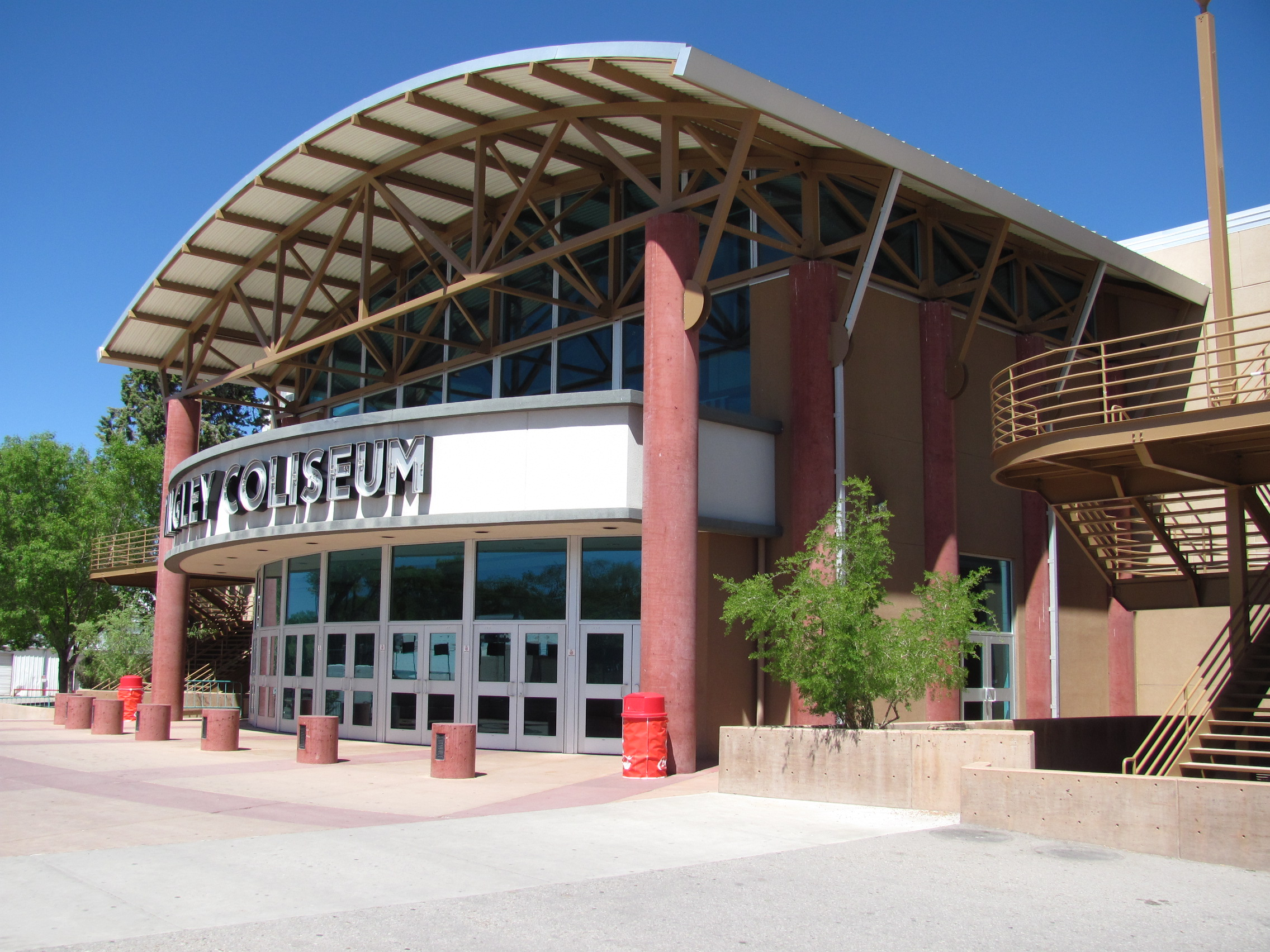
- Level: Senior
- Type: Indoor
- Events: 21 (12 men's + 9 women's)

The 1966 USA Indoor Track and Field Championships were held at Tingley Coliseum in Albuquerque, New Mexico. Organized by the Amateur Athletic Union (AAU), the competition took place on March 4-5 and served as the national championships in indoor track and field for the United States.

At the championships, Bill Gaines tied the world record of 5.9 seconds in the 60 yards prelims, and then went on to win the event in 6.0 seconds.

== Medal summary ==
=== Men ===
Event	Gold		Silver		Bronze
60 yards	Bill Gaines	6.0			
600 yards	Theron Lewis	1:09.2			
1000 yards	Ted Nelson	2:07.8			
Mile run	Jim Grelle	4:09.5			
3 miles	Lajos Mecser (HUN)	13:40.4	Tracy Smith	13:42.4	
60 yards hurdles	Willie Davenport	6.9			
High jump	John Thomas	2.13 m			
Pole vault	Bob Seagren	5.19 m			
Long jump	Norm Tate	7.62 m			
Shot put	John McGrath	19.59 m			
Weight throw	Hal Connolly	21.61 m			
1 mile walk	Rudy Haluza	6:39.2			

=== Women ===
Event	Gold		Silver		Bronze
60 yards	Wyomia Tyus	6.5			
220 yards	Edith McGuire	24.1			
440 yards	Charlette Cooke	54.2			
880 yards	Zsuzsa Szabo (HUN)	2:08.6	Marie Mulder	2:11.8	
60 yards hurdles	Chi Cheng (TPE)	7.6	Cheryl Sherrard	7.6	
High jump	Eleanor Montgomery	1.73 m			
Long jump	Chi Cheng (TPE)	6.03 m	Willye White	19 ft 6 1/4 in (5.94 m)	
Shot put	Joan Whitehead	12.49 m			
Basketball throw	Barbara Friedrich	134 ft 10 in (41.09 m)			
