= 1937 USA Indoor Track and Field Championships =

National athletics championship event

- Dates: February 27 (men); April 23 (women)
- Host city: New York City, New York, United States (men); St. Louis, Missouri, United States (women)
- Venue: Madison Square Garden (men); St. Louis Coliseum (women)
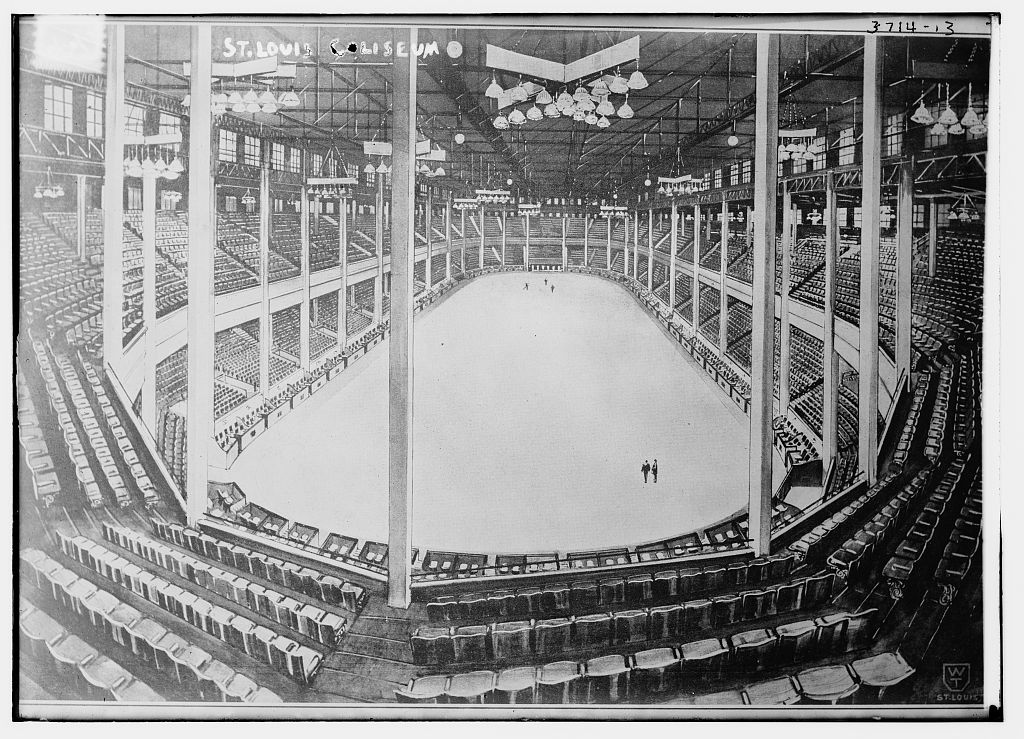
- Level: Senior
- Type: Indoor
- Events: 20 (13 men's + 7 women's)

The 1937 USA Indoor Track and Field Championships were organized by the Amateur Athletic Union (AAU) and served as the national championships in indoor track and field for the United States.

The men's edition was held at Madison Square Garden in New York City, New York, and it took place February 27. The women's meet was held separately at the St. Louis Coliseum in St. Louis, Missouri, taking place April 23.

Archie San Romani's win in the 1500 m was considered the "greatest upset of the 1937 indoor track and field season". About 16,000 spectators attended the men's edition.

== Medal summary ==
=== Men ===
Event	Gold		Silver		Bronze
60 m	Ben Johnson	6.8			
600 m	Edward O'Brien	1:23.0			
1000 m	Elroy Robinson	2:29.4			
1500 m	Archie San Romani	3:51.2			
5000 m	Norman Bright	14:45.8			
65 m hurdles	Sam Allen	8.8			
3000 m steeplechase (Note: Run without a water jump.)	Thomas Deckard	8:48.6	Joe McCluskey		Harold Manning
High jump	Ed Burke	2.06 m			
Pole vault	Earle Meadows	4.34 m			
Long jump	Sam Richardson (CAN)	7.50 m	Anson Perina	23 ft 5 1/4 in (7.14 m)	
Shot put	Dimitri Zaitz	15.66 m			
Weight throw	Irving Folwartshny	17.49 m			
1500 m walk	Nat Jaeger	6:20.2			

=== Women ===
Event	Gold		Silver		Bronze	
50 m	Helen Stephens	6.5				
200 m	Helen Stephens	28.5				
50 m hurdles	Jane Santschi	7.7				
High jump	Loretta Murphy	1.46 m				
Standing long jump	Claire Isicson	2.49 m				
Shot put	Helen Stephens	13.45 m				
Basketball throw	Evelyn Ferrara	97 ft 4 in (29.66 m)	Catherine Fellmeth	89 ft 9 in (27.35 m)	Marie Bean	85 ft 0 in (25.9 m)
