= 1945 USA Indoor Track and Field Championships =

National athletics championship event

- Dates: February 24 (men); March 31 (women)
- Host city: New York City, New York, United States (men); Buffalo, New York, United States (women)
- Venue: Madison Square Garden (men); Connecticut Street Armory (women)
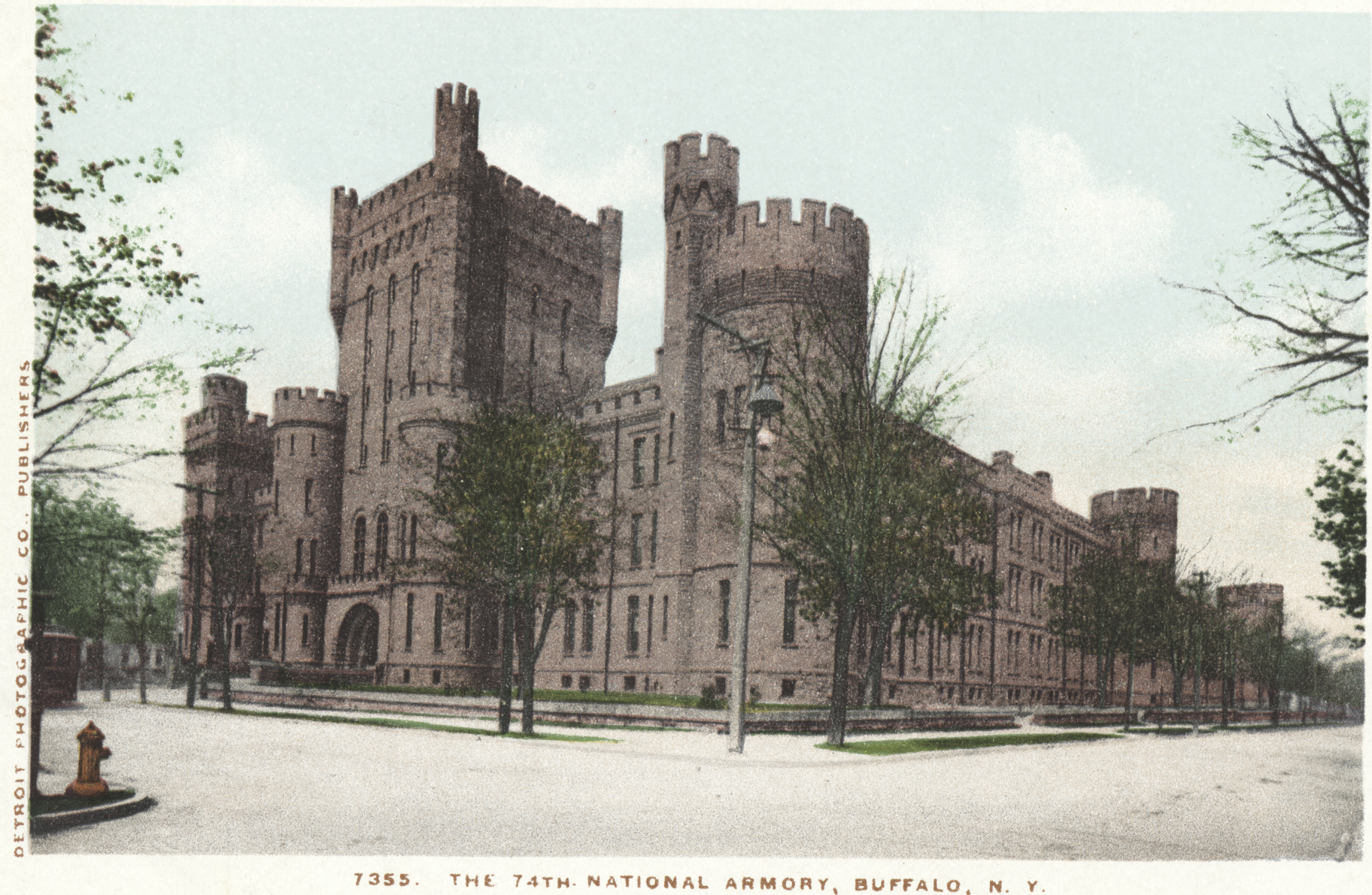
- Level: Senior
- Type: Indoor
- Events: 19 (12 men's + 7 women's)

The 1945 USA Indoor Track and Field Championships were organized by the Amateur Athletic Union (AAU) and served as the national championships in indoor track and field for the United States.

The men's edition was held at Madison Square Garden in New York City, New York, and it took place February 24. The women's meet was held separately at the Connecticut Street Armory in Buffalo, New York, taking place March 31.

The women's championships were held in conjunction with invitational men's mile and hurdles events.

== Medal summary ==
=== Men ===
Event	Gold		Silver	Bronze
60 yards	Norwood "Barney" Ewell	6.2		
600 yards	Elmore Harris	1:13.2		
1000 yards	Don Burnham	2:17.7		
Mile run	James Rafferty	4:17.5		
3 miles	Forest Efaw	14:26.3		
60 yards hurdles	Ed Dugger	7.5		
High jump	Ken Wiesner	1.98 m		
High jump	Josh Williamson	1.98 m		
Pole vault	Bill Moore	4.22 m		
Long jump	Norwood "Barney" Ewell	7.29 m		
Shot put	Wilfred Bangert	15.38 m		
Weight throw	Henry Dreyer	17.02 m		
1 mile walk	Joe Medgyesi	7:13.9		

=== Women ===
Event	Gold		Silver	Bronze
50 yards	Alice Coachman	6.1		
220 yards	Stella Walsh (POL)	26.3	Nell Jackson	
50 yards hurdles	Nancy Cowperthwaite-Phillips	7.6		
High jump	Alice Coachman	1.42 m		
Standing long jump	Clara Schroth	2.43 m		
Shot put	Dorothy Dodson	10.70 m		
Basketball throw	Marion Twining	94 ft 10 1/2 in (28.91 m)		
