= 1967 USA Indoor Track and Field Championships =

National athletics championship event

- Dates: March 3-4
- Host city: Oakland, California, United States
- Venue: Oakland–Alameda County Coliseum Arena
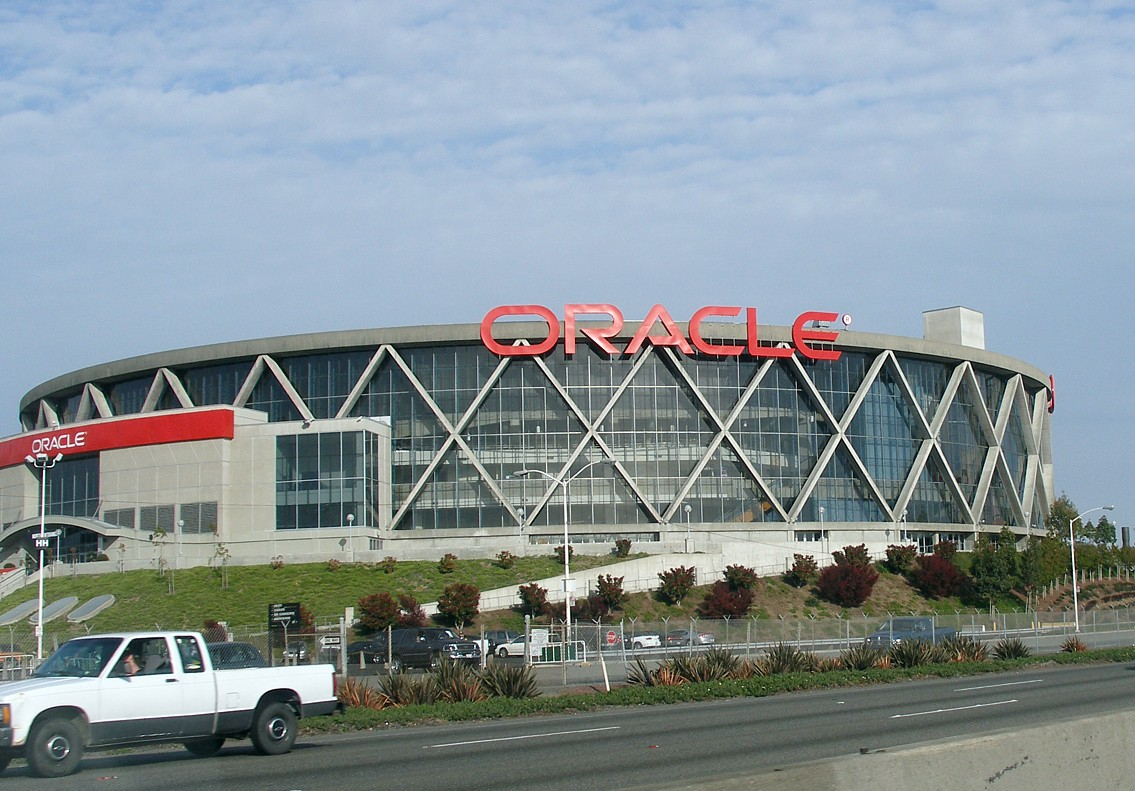
- Level: Senior
- Type: Indoor
- Events: 23 (13 men's + 10 women's)

The 1967 USA Indoor Track and Field Championships were held at the Oakland–Alameda County Coliseum Arena in Oakland, California. Organized by the Amateur Athletic Union (AAU), the competition took place on March 3-4 and served as the national championships in indoor track and field for the United States.

At the championships, Bob Seagren attempted the pole vault world record of 17 ft 7 in (5.35 m) but didn't clear the height. His failure was blamed on the short runway, forcing Seagren to start his run-ups on the banked track. Bill Gaines won the men's 60 yards, which he did while borrowing the running spikes of Wyomia Tyus. The attendance was considered light, at only 5,264 people though tickets cost as much as $6.

The women's championships marked the first time that the mile run was contested. The men's championships added the triple jump for the first time.

== Medal summary ==
=== Men ===
Event	Gold		Silver	Bronze
60 yards	Bill Gaines	6.0		
600 yards	Jim Kemp	1:10.6		
1000 yards	Preston Davis	2:09.4		
Mile run	Sam Bair	4:03.2		
3 miles	Tracy Smith	13:16.2		
60 yards hurdles	Willie Davenport	7.0		
High jump	John Rambo	2.16 m		
Pole vault	Bob Seagren	5.20 m		
Long jump	Bob Beamon	8.21 m		
Triple jump	Art Walker	16.11 m		
Shot put	George Woods	19.48 m		
Weight throw	Ed Burke	21.08 m		
1 mile walk	Don DeNoon	6:28.0		

=== Women ===
Event	Gold		Silver		Bronze
60 yards	Wyomia Tyus	6.7			
220 yards	Una Morris (JAM)	25.0	Kathy Hammond	25.5	
440 yards	Kathy Hammond	55.2			
880 yards	Madeline Manning	2:08.4			
Mile run	Doris Brown	4:43.3			
60 yards hurdles	Patty Van Wolvelaere	7.7			
High jump	Eleanor Montgomery	1.75 m			
Long jump	Martha Watson	6.26 m			
Shot put	Lynn Graham	14.14 m			
Basketball throw	Barbara Friedrich	131 ft 1 1/2 in (39.96 m)			
