= 1946 USA Indoor Track and Field Championships =

National athletics championship event

- Dates: February 23 (men); March 31 (women)
- Host city: New York City, New York, United States (men); Cleveland, Ohio, United States (women)
- Venue: Madison Square Garden (men); Cleveland Arena (women)
- Level: Senior
- Type: Indoor
- Events: 19 (12 men's + 7 women's)

The 1946 USA Indoor Track and Field Championships were organized by the Amateur Athletic Union (AAU) and served as the national championships in indoor track and field for the United States.

The men's edition was held at Madison Square Garden in New York City, New York, and it took place February 23. The women's meet was held separately at the Cleveland Arena in Cleveland, Ohio, taking place March 31.

At the championships, Leslie MacMitchell won his first national title in the mile. It was described as "the brass ring that had always escaped him in the past".

== Medal summary ==
=== Men ===
Event	Gold		Silver		Bronze
60 yards	Tom Carey	6.3			
600 yards	Elmore Harris	1:12.9			
1000 yards	Fred Sickinger	2:15.8			
Mile run	Leslie MacMitchell	4:18.1			
3 miles	Forest Efaw	14:40.1			
60 yards hurdles	Ed Dugger	7.6			
High jump	John Vislocky	1.98 m			
Pole vault	Bill Moore	4.19 m			
Long jump	Sam Richardson (CAN)	7.39 m	Max Minor	24 ft 3 in (7.39 m)	
Shot put	Bernie Mayer	16.07 m			
Weight throw	Henry Dreyer	16.80 m			
1 mile walk	Joe Medgyesi	7:11.4			

=== Women ===
Event	Gold		Silver	Bronze
50 yards	Alice Coachman	6.4		
220 yards	Stella Walsh (POL)	28.6	Juanita Watson	
50 yards hurdles	Lillie Purifoy	7.8		
High jump	Alice Coachman	1.39 m		
Standing long jump	Lorraine Boeson	2.46 m		
Shot put	Dorothy Dodson	10.52 m		
Basketball throw	Marian Twining	101 ft 4 1/4 in (30.89 m)		
