= 1949 USA Indoor Track and Field Championships =

National athletics championship event

- Dates: February 19 (men); March 26 (women)
- Host city: New York City, New York, United States
- Venue: Madison Square Garden (men); 2nd Engineers Armory (women)
- Level: Senior
- Type: Indoor
- Events: 19 (12 men's + 7 women's)

The 1949 USA Indoor Track and Field Championships were organized by the Amateur Athletic Union (AAU) and served as the national championships in indoor track and field for the United States.

The men's edition was held at Madison Square Garden in New York City, New York, and it took place February 19. The women's meet was held separately at the 2nd Engineers Armory on March 26.

At the championships, Bill Dwyer won the men's 60 yards in what was described as the "most solid victory" in 20 years.

== Medal summary ==
=== Men ===
Event	Gold		Silver	Bronze
60 yards	Bill Dwyer	6.2		
600 yards	Dave Bolen	1:11.6		
1000 yards	Bob Mealey	2:13.9		
Mile run	Willem Slijkhuis (NED)	4:11.2	Ingvar Bengtsson (SWE)	Neil Pratt
3 miles	Gaston Reiff (BEL)	14:08.1	Erik Ahlden (SWE)	Fred Wilt
60 yards hurdles	Harrison Dillard	7.2		
High jump	Richard Phillips	2.01 m		
Pole vault	Richmond "Boo" Morcom	4.46 m		
Long jump	Herb Douglas	7.60 m		
Shot put	Wilbur Thompson	16.71 m		
Weight throw	Sam Felton	17.67 m		
1 mile walk	Henry Laskau	6:29.5		

=== Women ===
Event	Gold		Silver	Bronze
50 yards	Dolores Dwyer	6.4		
220 yards	Mae Faggs	25.9		
50 yards hurdles	Bernice Robinson	7.2		
High jump	Nancy Cowperthwaite-Phillips	1.40 m		
Standing long jump	Nancy Cowperthwaite-Phillips	2.52 m		
Shot put	Ramona Massey	11.65 m		
Basketball throw	Ottilie Barth	94 ft 4 1/2 in (28.76 m)		
