= 1932 USA Indoor Track and Field Championships =

National athletics championship event

- Dates: February 22 (men); March 12 (women)
- Host city: New York City, New York, United States (men); Newark, New Jersey, United States (women)
- Venue: Madison Square Garden (men); Newark Armory (women)
- Level: Senior
- Type: Indoor
- Events: 21 (14 men's + 7 women's)

The 1932 USA Indoor Track and Field Championships were organized by the Amateur Athletic Union (AAU) and served as the national championships in indoor track and field for the United States.

The men's edition was held at Madison Square Garden in New York City, New York, and it took place February 22. The women's meet was held separately at the Newark Armory in Newark, New Jersey, taking place March 12.

At the men's championships, three world records were broken. Gene Venzke's mile win was described as a "walk-over", with only two rivals challenging him instead of the originally expected ten. Unlike in previous championships, the standing high jump was dropped from the program.

== Medal summary ==
=== Men ===
| Event | Gold | | Silver | Bronze |
|---|---|---|---|---|
| 60 yards | Emmett Toppino | 6.2 | | |
| 300 yards | Horace Whitney | 32.8 | | |
| 600 yards | Alex Wilson (CAN) | 1:13.0 | Edwin Roll | |
| 1000 yards | Dale Letts | 2:13.0 | | |
| Mile run | Gene Venzke | 4:15.0 | | |
| 3 miles | George Lermond | 14:26.4 | | |
| 70 yards hurdles | Percy Beard | 8.7 | | |
| 2 miles steeplechase | Joseph McCluskey | 9:46.4 | | |
| High jump | George Spitz | 2.01 m | | |
| Pole vault | Fred Sturdy | 4.11 m | | |
| Long jump | Everett Utterback | 7.21 m | | |
| Shot put | Herman Brix | 15.66 m | | |
| Weight throw | Leo Sexton | 15.48 m | | |
| 1 mile walk | Michael Pecora | 6:27.2 | | |

=== Women ===
| Event | Gold | | Silver | Bronze |
|---|---|---|---|---|
| 40 yards | Mary Carew | 5.6 | | |
| 220 yards | Catherine Capp | 28.6 | | |
| 50 yards hurdles | Nellie Sharka | 7.8 | | |
| High jump | Jean Shiley | 1.57 m | | |
| Standing long jump | Kay Ungenach | 2.46 m | | |
| Shot put | Margaret "Rena" MacDonald | 11.74 m | | |
| Basketball throw | Carolyn Dieckman | 87 ft 3 in (26.59 m) | | |
