= 1982 USA Indoor Track and Field Championships =

National athletics championship event

- Dates: February 26
- Host city: New York City, New York, United States
- Venue: Madison Square Garden
- Level: Senior
- Type: Indoor
- Events: 25 (14 men's + 11 women's)

The 1982 USA Indoor Track and Field Championships were held at Madison Square Garden in New York City, New York. Organized by The Athletics Congress (TAC), the competition took place on February 26 and served as the national championships in indoor track and field for the United States.

Many big stars either did not show or underperformed, but little-known Joan Hansen, nicknamed "Joanie-come-lately", won the women's 2-mile in a world indoor record time.

== Medal summary ==
=== Men ===
Event	Gold		Silver		Bronze
60 yards	Ron Brown	6.14			
440 yards	Walter McCoy	48.24			
600 yards	Fred Sowerby (ANT)	1:09.50	Stan Redwine	1:09.79	
1000 yards	Don Paige	2:05.81			
Mile run	Jim Spivey	3:57.04			
3 miles	Paul Cummings	13:00.52			
60 yards hurdles	Tonie Campbell	7.13			
High jump	Dwight Stones	2.25 m			
Pole vault	Billy Olson	5.65 m			
Long jump	Carl Lewis	8.55 m			
Triple jump	Keith Connor (GBR)	17.04 m	Robert Cannon	55 ft 2 1/4 in (16.82 m)	
Shot put	Jeff Braun	20.08 m			
Weight throw	Ed Kania	21.35 m			
2 miles walk	Jim Heiring	12:24.82			

=== Women ===
Event	Gold		Silver		Bronze
60 yards	Evelyn Ashford	6.54			
220 yards	Chandra Cheeseborough	23.46			
440 yards	Maxine Underwood	54.55			
880 yards	Leann Warren	2:04.61			
Mile run	Cathie Twomey	4:32.92			
2 miles	Joan Hansen	9:37.03			
60 yards hurdles	Stephanie Hightower	7.38			
High jump	Coleen Sommer	1.91 m			
Long jump	Veronica Bell	6.07 m			
Shot put	Marita Walton (IRL)	17.06 m	Denise Wood	53 ft 5 in (16.28 m)	
1 mile walk	Sue Brodock	7:07.14			
