= 1948 USA Indoor Track and Field Championships =

National athletics championship event

- Dates: February 21 (men); April 24 (women)
- Host city: New York City, New York, United States (men); Chicago, Illinois, United States (women)
- Venue: Madison Square Garden (men); Henry Crown Field House (women)
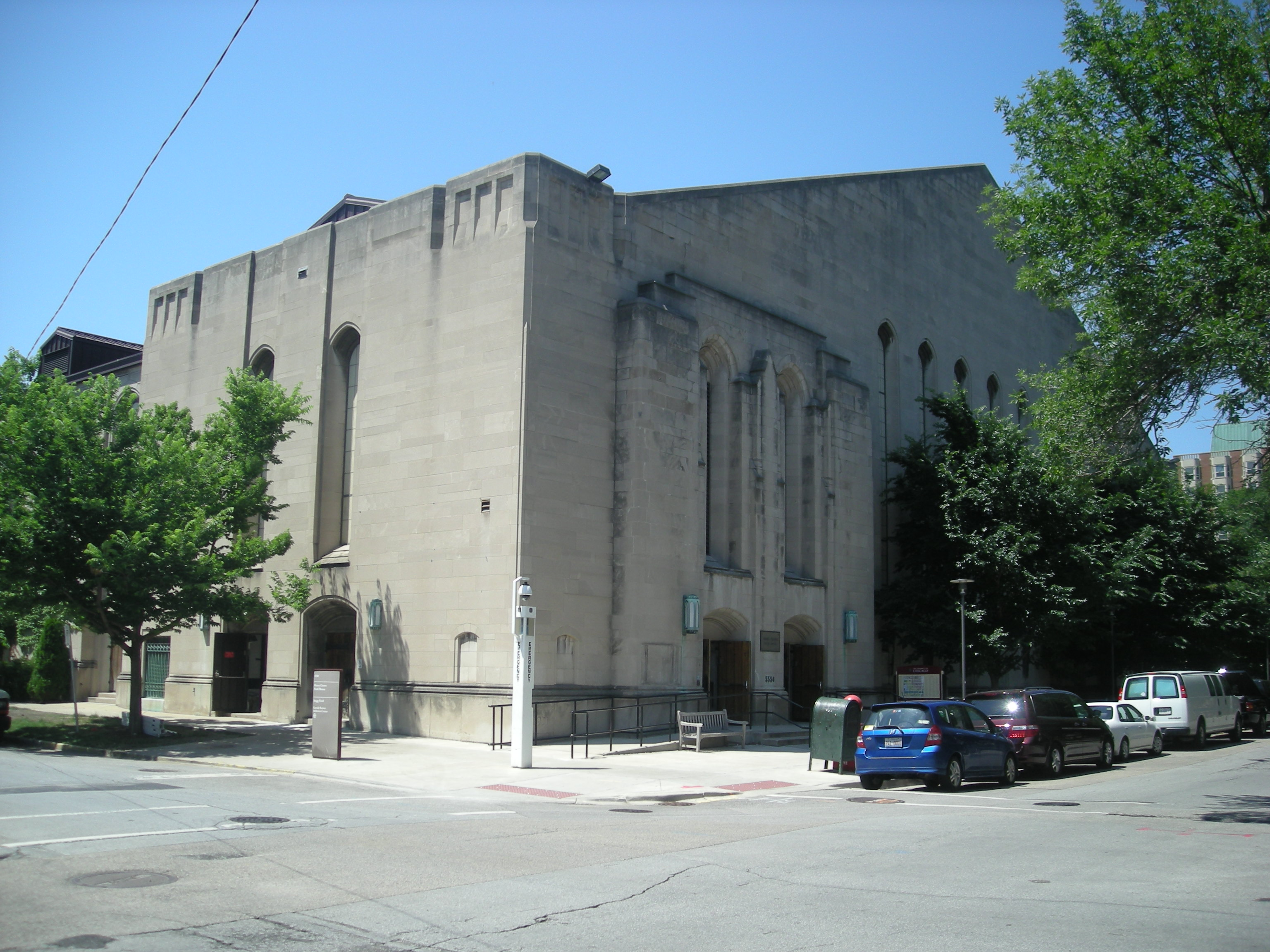
- Level: Senior
- Type: Indoor
- Events: 20 (12 men's + 8 women's)

The 1948 USA Indoor Track and Field Championships were organized by the Amateur Athletic Union (AAU) and served as the national championships in indoor track and field for the United States.

The men's edition was held at Madison Square Garden in New York City, New York, and it took place February 21. The women's meet was held separately at the Henry Crown Field House in Chicago, Illinois, taking place April 24.

At the championships, Harrison Dillard equalled the world indoor record of 7.2 seconds in the 60 yards hurdles. 13,607 spectators attended the men's edition.

== Medal summary ==
=== Men ===
Event	Gold		Silver	Bronze
60 yards	Ed Conwell	6.1		
600 yards	Dave Bolen	1:11.8		
1000 yards	Phil Thigpen	2:16.4		
Mile run	Tom Quinn	4:13.2		
3 miles	Curt Stone	14:23.6		
60 yards hurdles	Harrison Dillard	7.2		
High jump	John Vislocky	2.01 m		
Pole vault	Bob Richards	4.42 m		
Long jump	Lorenzo Wright	7.71 m		
Shot put	Norman Wasser	16.36 m		
Weight throw	Bob Bennett	17.09 m		
1 mile walk	Henry Laskau	6:43.8		

=== Women ===
Event	Gold		Silver	Bronze
50 m	Juanita Watson	6.5		
200 m	Audrey Patterson	26.4		
50 m hurdles	Theresa Manuel	7.4		
High jump	Emma Reed	1.50 m		
Standing long jump	Nancy Cowperthwaite-Phillips	2.42 m		
Long jump (Note: Described as a "special event")	Nancy Cowperthwaite-Phillips	17 ft 2 1/4 in (5.23 m)		
Shot put	Frances Kaszubski	11.69 m		
Basketball throw	Stella Gorka	92 ft 7 in (28.21 m)		
