= 1953 USA Indoor Track and Field Championships =

National athletics championship event

- Dates: February 14 (men); March 22 (women)
- Host city: New York City, New York, United States (men); Buffalo, New York, United States (women)
- Venue: Madison Square Garden (men); Connecticut Street Armory (women)
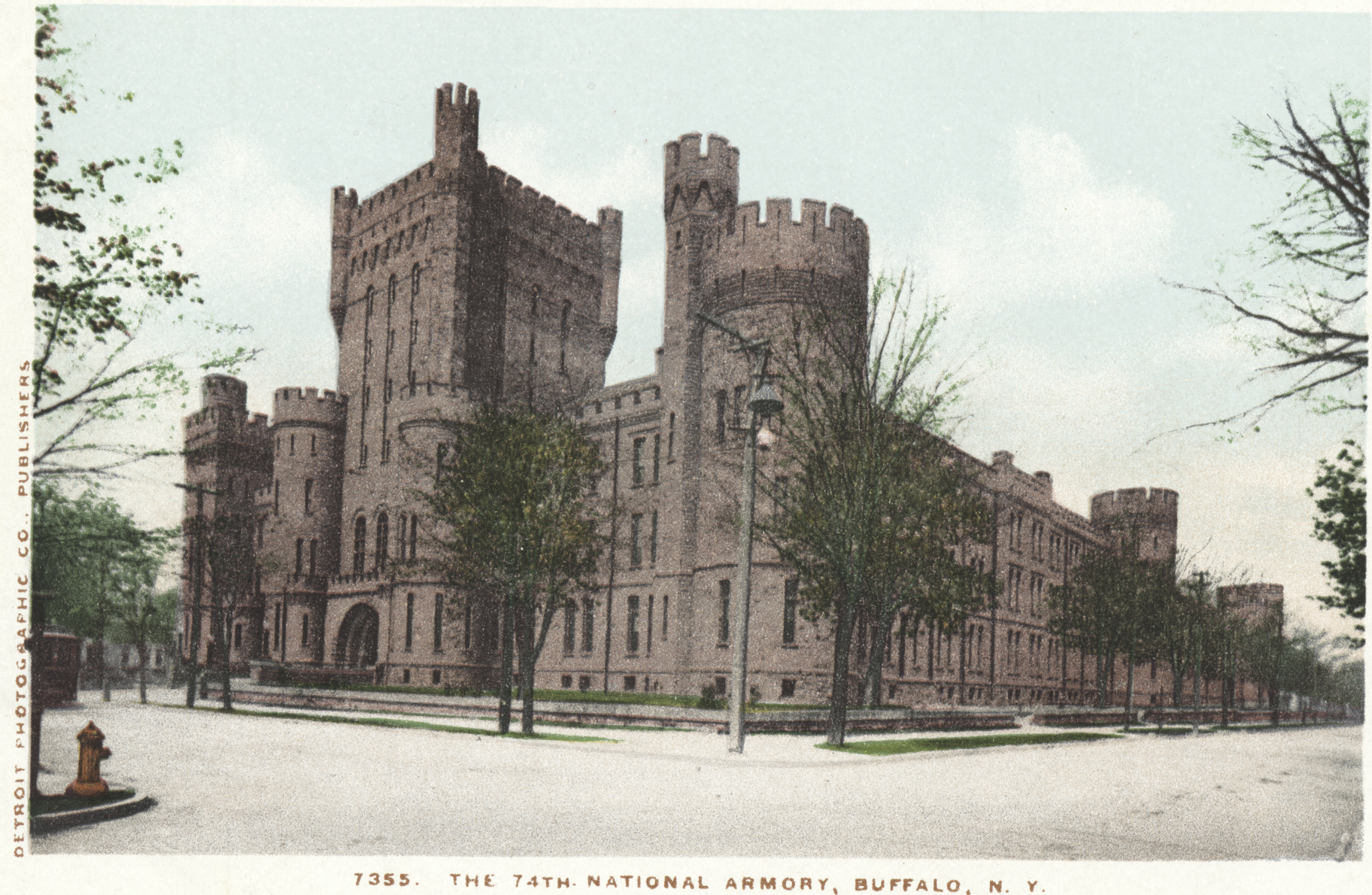
- Level: Senior
- Type: Indoor
- Events: 20 (12 men's + 8 women's)

The 1953 USA Indoor Track and Field Championships were organized by the Amateur Athletic Union (AAU) and served as the national championships in indoor track and field for the United States.

The men's edition was held at Madison Square Garden in New York City, New York, and it took place February 14. The women's meet was held separately at the Connecticut Street Armory in Buffalo, New York, taking place March 22.

The women's meet was held in conjunction with the JY Cameron Memorial Meet, which featured a long-track men's 4 × 440 yards relay world record.

== Medal summary ==
=== Men ===
Event	Gold		Silver	Bronze
60 yards	John Haines	6.2		
600 yards	Mal Whitfield	1:10.4		
1000 yards	Heinz Ulzheimer (FRG)	2:09.4	Don Gehrmann	
Mile run	Fred Dwyer	4:12.4		
3 miles	Horace Ashenfelter	13:47.5		
60 yards hurdles	Harrison Dillard	7.3		
High jump	Lewis Hall	2.05 m		
Pole vault	Bob Richards	4.58 m		
Long jump	Meredith Gourdine	7.55 m		
Shot put	Parry O'Brien	17.03 m		
Weight throw	Steve Dillon	18.24 m		
1 mile walk	Henry Laskau	6:20.6		

=== Women ===
Event	Gold		Silver	Bronze
50 yards	Mabel "Dolly" Landry	6.3		
100 yards	Cynthia Robinson	11.4		
220 yards	Janet Moreau	26.5		
50 yards hurdles	Nancy Cowperthwaite-Phillips	7.1		
High jump	Marion Boos	1.56 m		
Standing long jump	Janet Moreau	2.61 m		
Shot put	Amelia Bert	12.46 m		
Basketball throw	Ramona Massey	95 ft 8 in (29.15 m)		
