= 1929 USA Indoor Track and Field Championships =

National athletics championship event

- Dates: February 23 (men); March 30 (women)
- Host city: New York City, New York, United States (men); Boston, Massachusetts, United States (women)
- Venue: Madison Square Garden (men); Boston Garden (women)
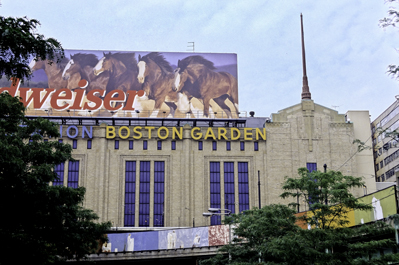
- Level: Senior
- Type: Indoor
- Events: 20 (13 men's + 7 women's)

The 1929 USA Indoor Track and Field Championships were organized by the Amateur Athletic Union (AAU) and served as the national championships in indoor track and field for the United States.

The men's edition was held at Madison Square Garden in New York City, New York, and it took place February 23. The women's meet was held separately at Boston Garden in Boston, Massachusetts, taking place March 30.

Paavo Nurmi was originally scheduled to compete, but he withdrew shortly before the competition. In his place, Finnish athlete Eino Purje broke the world record in the indoor 2-mile steeplechase. About 6,000 spectators attended the men's edition.

== Medal summary ==
=== Men ===
Event	Gold		Silver	Bronze
60 yards	James Daley	6.6		
300 yards	Charles Engle	33.2		
600 yards	Phil Edwards (BGU)	1:12.0	Eddie Blake	
1000 yards	Ray Conger	2:13.2		
2 miles	Edvin Wide (SWE)	9:07.0	Robert Dalrymple	
70 yards hurdles	Monty Wells	8.8		
2 miles steeplechase	Eino Purje (FIN)	9:55.4	Ove Anderson (FIN)	Franklin Osgood
High jump	Charles W. Major	1.90 m		
Standing high jump	Harold Osborn	6 ft 1 in (1.85 m)		
Pole vault	Fred Sturdy	4.19 m		
Standing long jump	William Werner	3.20 m		
Shot put	Herb Schwarze	15.31 m		
1 mile walk	Harry Hinkel	6:40.4		

=== Women ===
Event	Gold		Silver	Bronze
40 yards	Mary Carew	5.6		
220 yards	Catherine Donovan	29.0		
50 yards hurdles	Catherine Donovan	8.0		
High jump	Jean Shiley	1.60 m		
Standing long jump	Katherine Mearls	2.50 m		
Shot put	Margaret "Rena" MacDonald	11.97 m		
Basketball throw	Marietta Ceres	85 ft 5 3/4 in (26.05 m)		
