= 1974 USA Indoor Track and Field Championships =

National athletics championship event

- Dates: February 22
- Host city: New York City, New York, United States
- Venue: Madison Square Garden
- Level: Senior
- Type: Indoor
- Events: 23 (13 men's + 10 women's)

The 1974 USA Indoor Track and Field Championships were held at Madison Square Garden in New York City, New York. Organized by the Amateur Athletic Union (AAU), the competition took place on February 22 and served as the national championships in indoor track and field for the United States.

The championships served as a selection event for a dual meet against the Soviet Union athletics team soon after. Long jumper Bouncy Moore protested the conditions of the jumping pit, which was filled with rocks and stable dirt. Moore qualified for the finals but did not jump after that out of protest. Moore said, "I ache all over, even though I only took one jump. If I had known the conditions would be this bad, I would have brought some sand from San Diego".

== Medal summary ==
=== Men ===
Event	Gold		Silver		Bronze
60 yards	Herb Washington	6.0			
600 yards	Wes Williams	1:11.3			
1000 yards	Rick Wohlhuter	2:06.8			
Mile run	John Walker (NZL)	4:01.6	Michael Slack	4:02.1	
3 miles	Dick Tayler (NZL)	13:08.6	Frank Shorter	13:18.0	
60 yards hurdles	Tom Hill	6.9			
High jump	Tom Woods	2.18 m			
Pole vault	Vic Dias	5.38 m			
Long jump	Jerry Proctor	7.87 m			
Triple jump	Milan Tiff	16.46 m			
Shot put	Terry Albritton	21.05 m			
Weight throw	Jacques Accambray (FRA)	21.48 m	George Frenn	67 ft 0 1/2 in (20.43 m)	
2 miles walk	Larry Walker	13:24.0			

=== Women ===
Event	Gold		Silver	Bronze
60 yards	Theresa Montgomery	6.7		
220 yards	Linda Cordy	25.0		
220 yards	Theresa Montgomery	25.0		
440 yards	Brenda Nichols	56.1		
880 yards	Mary Decker	2:07.1		
Mile run	Robin Campbell	4:50.7		
60 yards hurdles	Patty Johnson	7.7		
High jump	Joni Huntley	1.83 m		
Long jump	Martha Watson	6.33 m		
Shot put	Maren Seidler	16.56 m		
1 mile walk	Sue Brodock	7:28.6		
