= 1927 USA Indoor Track and Field Championships =

National athletics championship event

- Dates: February 28 (men); March 27 (women)
- Host city: New York City, New York, United States (men); Boston, Massachusetts, United States (women)
- Venue: Madison Square Garden (men); East Armory (women)
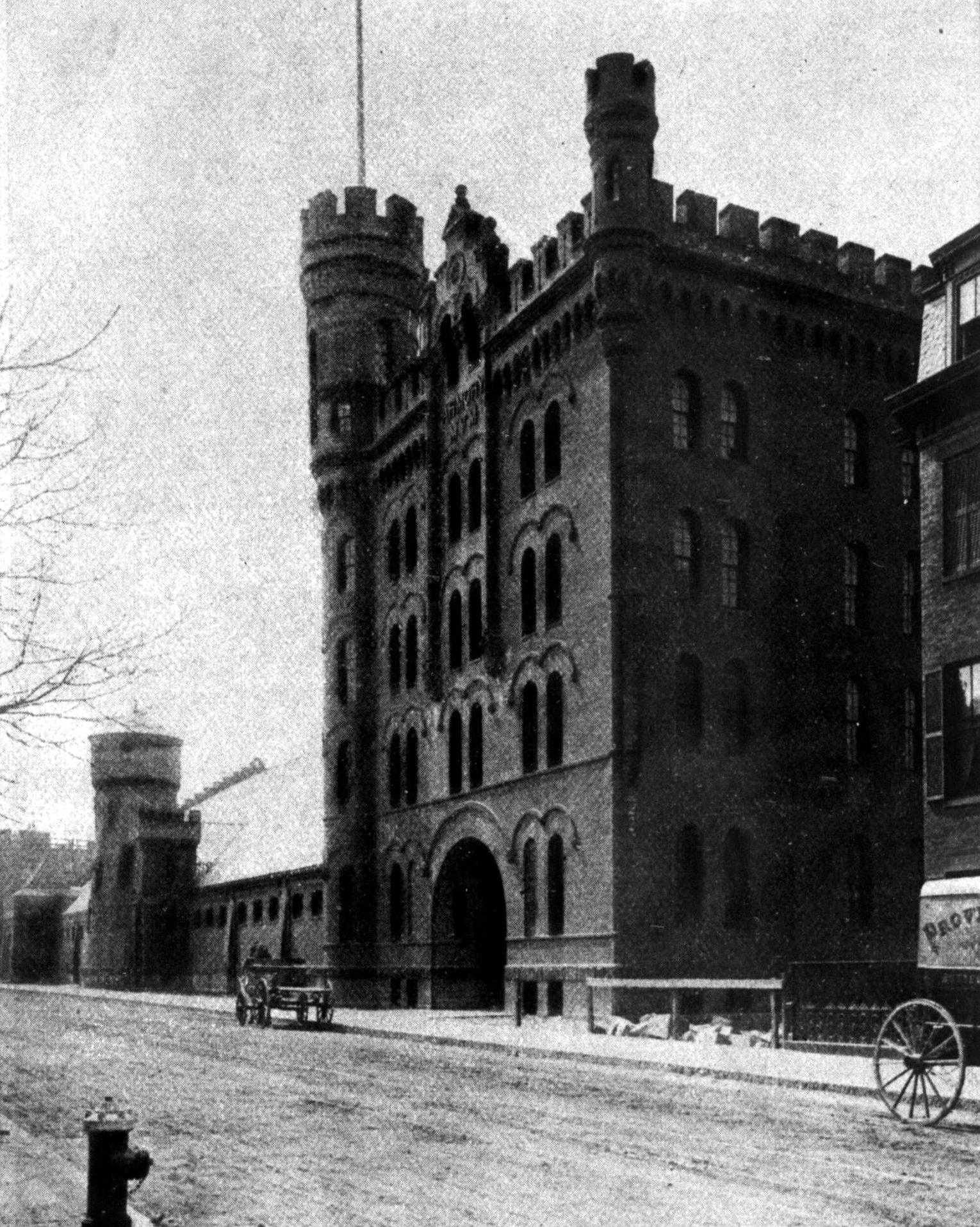
- Level: Senior
- Type: Indoor
- Events: 18 (13 men's + 5 women's)

The 1927 USA Indoor Track and Field Championships were organized by the Amateur Athletic Union (AAU) and served as the national championships in indoor track and field for the United States.

The men's edition was held at Madison Square Garden in New York City, New York, and it took place February 28. The women's meet was held separately at the East Armory in Boston, Massachusetts, taking place March 27.

It was the first ever official women's indoor track and field U.S. championships. Records were set in the long jump, 4 × 110 yards relay, and basketball throw, an early throwing event.

== Medal summary ==
=== Men ===
Event	Gold		Silver	Bronze
60 yards	Karl Wildermuth	6.4		
300 yards	Lanny Ross	31.8		
600 yards	George Leness	1:13.2		
1000 yards	Lloyd Hahn	2:12.8		
2 miles	William Goodwin	9:16.2		
70 yards hurdles	George Guthrie	9.0		
2 miles steeplechase	Ove Anderson (FIN)	10:00.6	Russell Payne	
High jump	Charles W. Major	1.93 m		
Standing high jump	Hans Hedberg	5 ft 2 in (1.57 m)		
Pole vault	Sabin Carr	3.96 m		
Standing long jump	Harold Osborn	3.17 m		
Shot put	Herb Schwarze	14.75 m		
1 mile walk	Willie Plant	6:34.8		

=== Women ===
Event	Gold		Silver	Bronze
40 yards	Rosa Grosse (CAN)	5.2	Eleanor Egg	
High jump	Mildred Wiley	1.45 m		
Standing long jump	Katherine Mearls	2.43 m		
Shot put	Margaret "Rena" MacDonald	9.78 m		
Basketball throw	Eleanor Churchill	87 ft 3 in (26.59 m)		
