= Ann Marie Flynn =

American high jumper (1938–2021)

Ann Marie Flynn (August 17, 1938 – July 22, 2021) was a female high jumper from the United States, who competed in the 1950s and 1960s for her native country. She was born in New York City and was a member of the German-American Athletic Club in Brooklyn. She set her personal best in the women's high jump event (1.65 metres) on July 18, 1959, at a meet in Philadelphia. She also competed in the discus throw and the heptathlon during her career. Flynn competed at the 1956 Summer Olympics but was the only athlete not to clear the qualifying height at the event.

== Achievements ==
Year	Competition	Venue	Position	Notes
1956	US National Championships	Philadelphia	2nd	
1957	US National Championships	Shaker Heights, Ohio	4th	
1958	US National Championships	Morristown, New Jersey	3rd	1.50 m
1959	Pan American Games	Chicago, United States	1st	1.61 m
1959	US National Championships	Cleveland, Ohio	4th	1.57 m
1960	US National Championships	Corpus Christi, Texas	6th	1.51 m
