= 1941 USA Indoor Track and Field Championships =

National athletics championship event

- Dates: February 22 (men); April 12 (women)
- Host city: New York City, New York, United States (men); Atlantic City, New Jersey, United States (women)
- Venue: Madison Square Garden (men); Atlantic City Convention Hall (women)
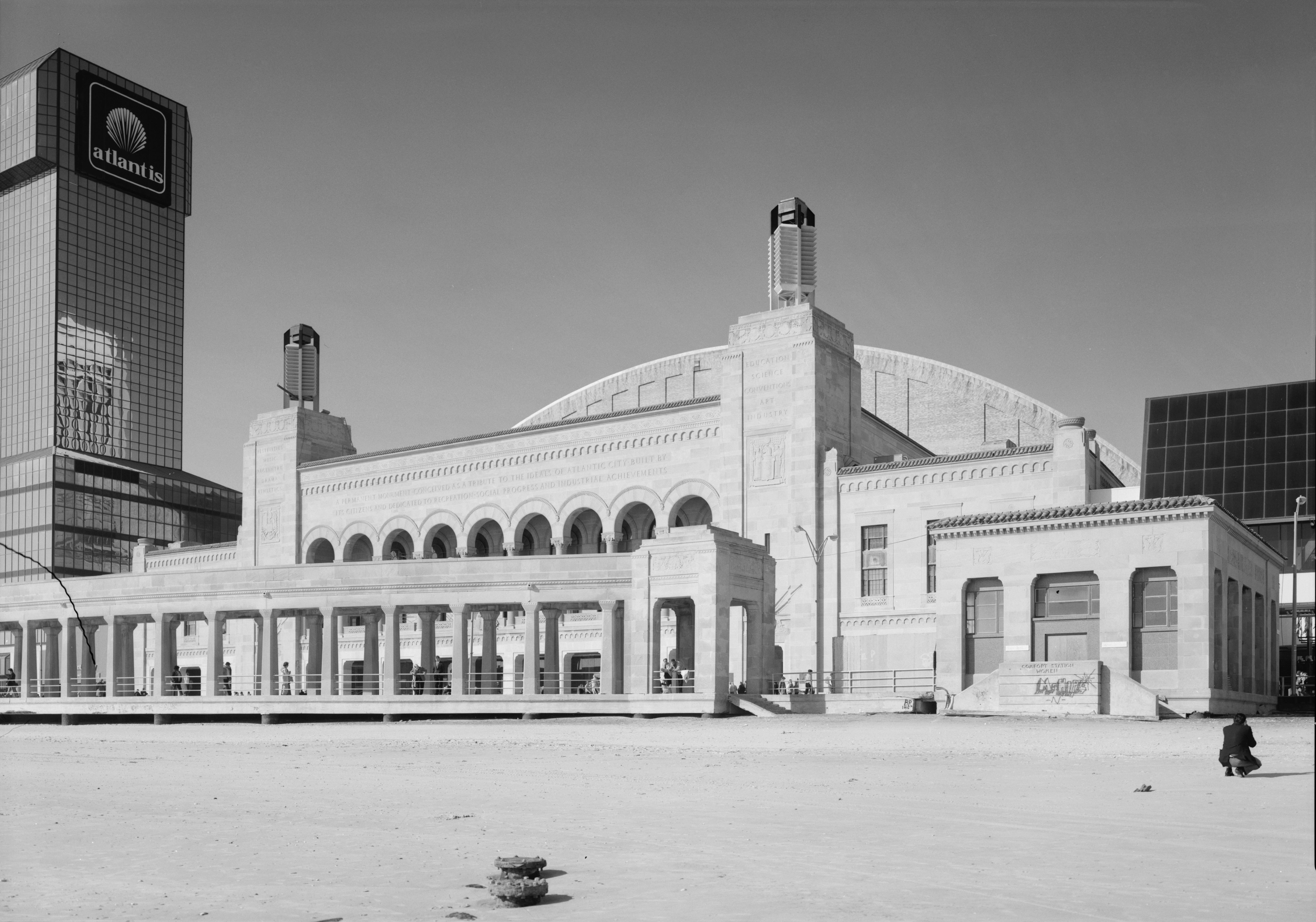
- Level: Senior
- Type: Indoor
- Events: 20 (13 men's + 7 women's)

The 1941 USA Indoor Track and Field Championships were organized by the Amateur Athletic Union (AAU) and served as the national championships in indoor track and field for the United States.

The men's edition was held at Madison Square Garden in New York City, New York, and it took place February 22. The women's meet was held separately at Atlantic City Convention Hall in Atlantic City, New Jersey, taking place April 12.

At the women's meet, the world indoor record for 200 metres was broken three times. It was first broken by Stella Walsh and then by Jean Lane in their respective qualifying heats. In the finals, Lane broke her own record to defeat Walsh and become national champion.

== Medal summary ==
=== Men ===
Event	Gold		Silver	Bronze
60 yards	Herbert Thompson	6.2		
600 yards	Jim Herbert	1:12.0		
1000 yards	John Borican	2:11.5		
Mile run	Walter Mehl	4:10.9		
3 miles	Greg Rice	13:51.0		
70 yards hurdles	Allan Tolmich	8.4		
2 miles steeplechase (Note: Run without a water jump.)	Joe McCluskey	9:35.4		
High jump	Mel Walker	1.99 m		
Pole vault	Earle Meadows	4.38 m		
Long jump	Lockhart Rogers	7.22 m		
Shot put	Al Blozis	16.77 m		
Weight throw	Henry Dreyer	16.97 m		
1 mile walk	Nat Jaeger	7:12.1		

=== Women ===
Event	Gold		Silver	Bronze
50 m	Jean Lane	6.8		
200 m	Jean Lane	25.1		
50 m hurdles	Lillie Purifoy	8.1		
High jump	Alice Coachman	1.52 m		
Standing long jump	Lucy Newell	2.48 m		
Basketball throw	Marian Twinning	93 ft 6 1/4 in (28.5 m)		
