= 1950 USA Indoor Track and Field Championships =

National athletics championship event

- Dates: February 18 (men); February 14 (women)
- Host city: New York City, New York, United States
- Venue: Madison Square Garden (men); 2nd Engineers Armory (women)
- Level: Senior
- Type: Indoor
- Events: 19 (12 men's + 7 women's)

The 1950 USA Indoor Track and Field Championships were organized by the Amateur Athletic Union (AAU) and served as the national championships in indoor track and field for the United States.

The men's edition was held at Madison Square Garden in New York City, New York, and it took place February 18. The women's meet was held separately at the 2nd Engineers Armory on February 14.

The women's championships were held in conjunction with that year's USA Junior Outdoor Track & Field Championships. They featured a 100-yard dash event, typically not contested indoors.

== Medal summary ==
=== Men ===
Event	Gold		Silver	Bronze
60 yards	Andy Stanfield	6.2		
600 yards	Hugo Maiocco	1:11.2		
1000 yards	Roscoe Browne	2:15.6		
Mile run	John Joe Barry (IRL)	4:11.5	Fred Wilt	
3 miles	Curt Stone	13:57.2		
60 yards hurdles	Harrison Dillard	7.3		
High jump	John Vislocky	1.98 m		
Pole vault	Bob Richards	4.27 m		
Long jump	Doug Fowlkes	7.79 m		
Shot put	Jim Fuchs	17.15 m		
Weight throw	Gil Borjeson	17.50 m		
1 mile walk	Henry Laskau	6:33.4		

=== Women ===
Event	Gold		Silver	Bronze
50 yards	Dolores Dwyer	6.5		
100 yards	Jean Patton	11.8		
220 yards	Mae Faggs	27.0		
50 yards hurdles	Nancy Cowperthwaite-Phillips	7.7		
High jump	Marion Boos	1.40 m		
Standing long jump	Nancy Cowperthwaite-Phillips	2.52 m		
Shot put	Amelia Bert	11.59 m		
Basketball throw	Ottilie Barth	101 ft 9 1/2 in (31.02 m)		
