= 1930 USA Indoor Track and Field Championships =

National athletics championship event

- Dates: March 18 (men); April 19 (women)
- Host city: New York City, New York, United States (men); Boston, Massachusetts, United States (women)
- Venue: Madison Square Garden (men); Boston Garden (women)
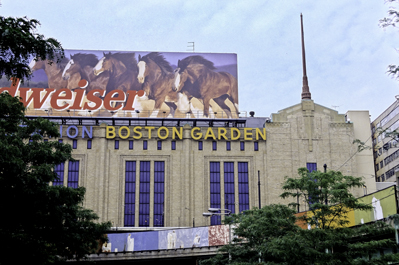
- Level: Senior
- Type: Indoor
- Events: 19 (13 men's + 6 women's)

The 1930 USA Indoor Track and Field Championships were organized by the Amateur Athletic Union (AAU) and served as the national championships in indoor track and field for the United States.

The men's edition was held at Madison Square Garden in New York City, New York, and it took place March 18. The women's meet was held separately at Boston Garden in Boston, Massachusetts, taking place April 19.

At the championships, Herman Brix of the Los Angeles Athletic Club broke the world record for the indoor 16 pounds (7.3 kg) shot put.

== Medal summary ==
=== Men ===
Event	Gold		Silver	Bronze
60 yards	Chester Bowman	6.4		
300 yards	John Lewis	32.2		
600 yards	Phil Edwards (BGU)	1:13.6	Eddie Roll	
1000 yards	Paul Martin (SUI)	2:12.6	Ray Conger	
2 miles	Joe McCluskey	9:30.8		
70 yards hurdles	Lee Sentman	8.6		
2 miles steeplechase	Hans Assert	10:35.3		
High jump	Anton Burg	1.88 m		
Standing high jump	Harold Osborn	5 ft 0 1/4 in (1.53 m)		
Pole vault	Fred Sturdy	4.19 m		
Standing long jump	William Werner	3.27 m		
Shot put	Herman Brix	15.60 m		
1 mile walk	Michael Pecora	6:43.8		

=== Women ===
Event	Gold		Silver	Bronze
40 yards	Mary Carew	5.2		
220 yards	Stella Walsh (POL)	26.2	Catherine Capp	
50 yards hurdles	Catherine Donovan	7.8		
High jump	Jean Shiley	1.61 m		
Standing long jump	Katherine Mearls	2.53 m		
Shot put	Margaret "Rena" MacDonald	11.62 m		
Basketball throw	Gertrude Mayer			
