= 1928 USA Indoor Track and Field Championships =

National athletics championship event

- Dates: February 25 (men); March 11 (women)
- Host city: New York City, New York, United States (men); Boston, Massachusetts, United States (women)
- Venue: Madison Square Garden (men); East Armory (women)
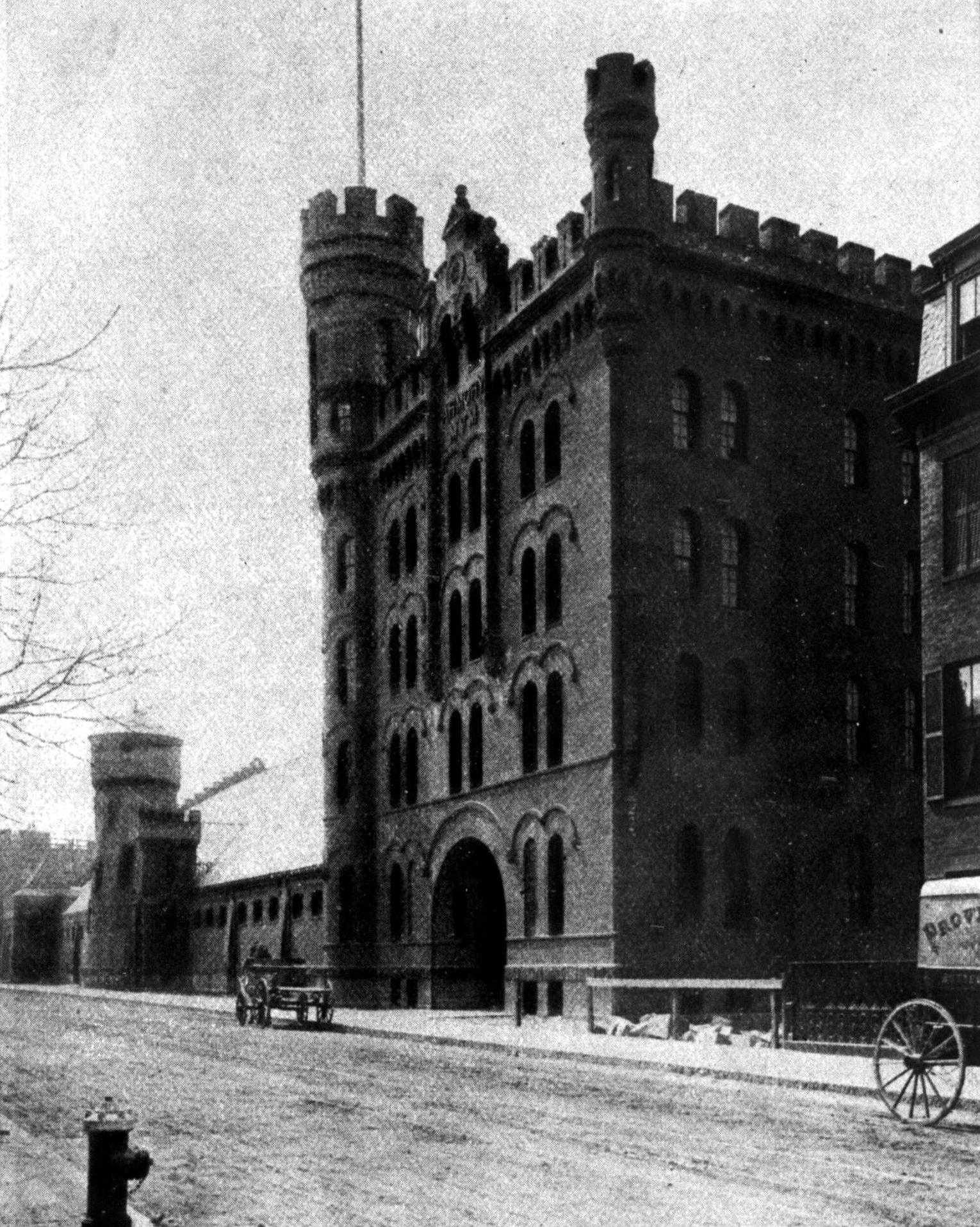
- Level: Senior
- Type: Indoor
- Events: 19 (13 men's + 6 women's)

The 1928 USA Indoor Track and Field Championships were organized by the Amateur Athletic Union (AAU) and served as the national championships in indoor track and field for the United States.

The men's edition was held at Madison Square Garden in New York City, New York, and it took place February 25. The women's meet was held separately at the East Armory in Boston, Massachusetts, taking place March 11 (delayed after an initially announced March 10 date).

At the championships, Sabin Carr set a new world record in the pole vault, better than all previous indoor or outdoor marks. About 15,000 spectators attended the men's edition.

== Medal summary ==
=== Men ===
Event	Gold		Silver	Bronze
60 yards	Karl Wildermuth	6.4		
300 yards	Lanny Ross	32.0		
600 yards	Phil Edwards (BGU)	1:14.2	George Leness	
1000 yards	Ray Conger	2:15.8		
2 miles	Leo Lermond	9:16.8		
70 yards hurdles	Weems Baskin	9.0		
2 miles steeplechase	William Spencer	10:15		
High jump	Anton Burg	1.89 m		
Standing high jump	Harold Osborn	5 ft 0 in (1.52 m)		
Pole vault	Sabin Carr	4.29 m		
Standing long jump	William Werner	3.17 m		
Shot put	Herb Schwarze	15.10 m		
1 mile walk	Harry Hinkel	6:35.4		

=== Women ===
Event	Gold		Silver	Bronze
40 yards	Katherine Mearls	5.4		
220 yards	Irene Moran	30.8		
50 yards hurdles	Mary Washburn	7.6		
High jump	Mildred Wiley	1.49 m		
Standing long jump	Katherine Mearls	2.51 m		
Shot put	Mabel Travers	10.14 m		
