= Alice Arden (athlete) =

American high jumper (1914–2012)

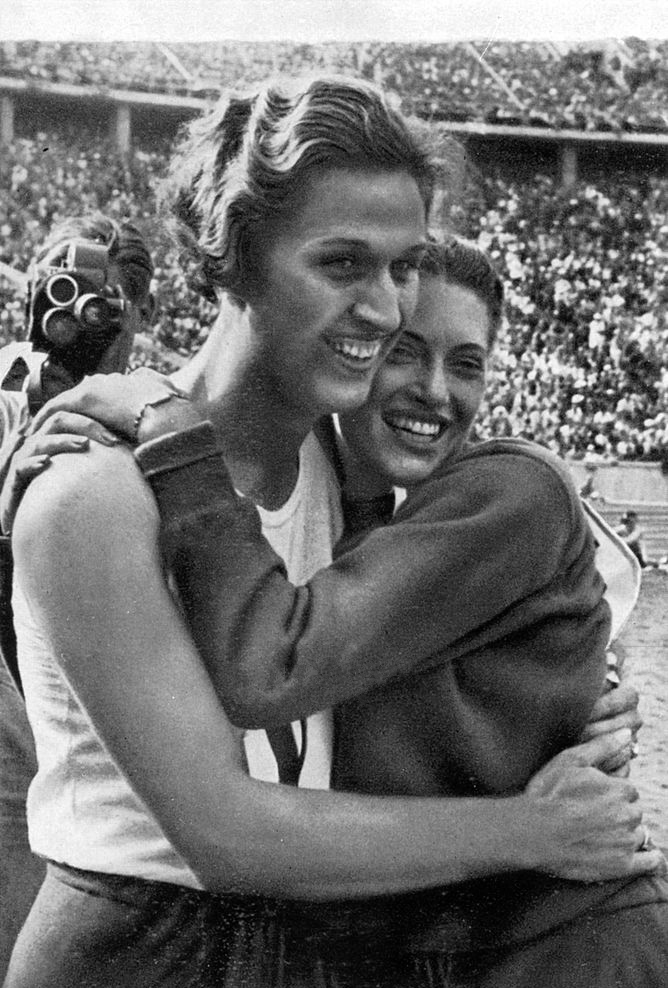
- Helen Stephens and Alice Arden (right) at the 1936 Olympics

Personal information
- Born: July 23, 1914 Philadelphia, Pennsylvania, United States
- Died: March 1, 2012 (aged 97) Roscoe, New York, United States
- Height: 1.70 m (5 ft 7 in)
- Weight: 61 kg (134 lb)

Sport
- Sport: Athletics
- Event: High jump
- Club: St. George's Dragon Club of New York

Achievements and titles
- Personal best: 1.61 m (1935)

Alice Jean Arden-Hodge (July 23, 1914 – March 1, 2012) was an American athlete who competed in the women's high jump event at the Olympic games in Berlin in 1936. Raised in Long Island, New York, Arden won ten athletic letters during her high school career across several different sports. The only woman from the New York City area to have been selected for the 1936 Summer Olympics women's team, Arden placed ninth in the high jump event and never competed in the sport again. Soon after, she married basketball player Russell Hodge and together they had three children, one of whom was Russ Hodge, a decathlete at the 1964 Summer Olympics in Tokyo. As of 2008, Arden and Hodge's participation make them the only mother-son Olympians in American history.

== Early life ==
Arden was born in Philadelphia, Pennsylvania, but grew up in Long Island, New York. Her father, Ray Arden, was an inventor who held over 400 patents. During her athletic career at Baldwin High School in New York, she won ten athletic letters in basketball, field hockey and athletics, and broke Babe Didrikson's high jump record. Arden had made what would become the best jump of her career in 1935, when she achieved a height of 1.613 m (5'3½").

== Olympic career ==
Arden finished second in the Olympic trials in Providence, Rhode Island, behind only Annette Rogers. She was selected to participate at the 1936 Summer Olympics in Berlin, the only female team member from the New York City area to participate in those games. Although $700 were raised for her trip, she was forced to return $200 due to Amateur Athletic Union regulations. She placed an equal ninth in the women's high jump event, with a height of 1.50 m., although this would have been eighth had it been discovered earlier that Dora Ratjen was actually a male. During the games, she forged strong friendships with many athletes and became lifelong friends with the head of the Turkish delegation. The Olympic Games, however, was her final competition.

== Later life ==
Inspired by the associations that she made at the Olympic Games, Arden became involved in numerous Olympic committees, working towards increased female participation in the events. She played basketball for the Long Island Ducklings, where she met Russel "Rusty" Hodge, a semi-professional player. Hodge, a center for the Liberty Emeralds, and Arden, also a center, were married in 1937. They had a son, Russ Hodge, in 1939 and moved from Monticello, New York, to Roscoe, New York, that same year. There, the Hodges operated a dairy farm and, later, furniture and gravel stores. Arden had a total of three children.

The younger Hodge competed in the decathlon at the 1964 Summer Olympics in Tokyo, where he placed ninth. On his mother's 52nd birthday, he set a world record in a decathlon event in Los Angeles. Arden's husband died in 2001. In August 2003, both Arden and her son were honoured with the Sullivan County Historical Society "History Maker" award. They are the only mother-son Olympians in the history of the United States. Still active in swimming at the age of 90, Arden died on March 1, 2012, at the age of 97.
