= Jo Ann Terry =

American hurdler (born 1938)

Personal information
- Born: August 4, 1938 (age 87) Indianapolis, Indiana
Medal record
Women's Athletics
Representing the United States
Pan American Games
Gold medal – first place	1963 São Paulo	80 m Hurdles

Jo Ann Terry-Grissom (born August 4, 1938) is a retired female hurdler from the United States, who represented her native country at two consecutive Summer Olympics.

== Athletic career ==
Terry got interested in track and field white at Crispus Attucks High School where she graduated from in 1956. in Terry was the 1960 AAU champion in both the high hurdles and the pentathlon. She attended Tennessee State University where she competed on the track team as well as the basketball team. She represented team USA in the 1960 Olympics where she finished 4th in her heat of the 80m Hurdles. Four years later she once again competed for team USA in the 1964 Olympics but this time in the Long Jump where she finished 19th in her round. In 1962, in between the olympic years, she won the 80m hurdles at the 1963 Pan American Games.

== Personal life ==
Terry got married in on November 23, 1963, to Leo Warner Grissom Jr. She became a physical education instructor at various schools in the IPS system.

She is featured in the 2018 documentary Mr. Temple and the Tigerbelles which focuses on coach Ed Temple and 40 African American female athletes who helped break the color barrier in the sport.
