= Barbara Friedrich =

American javelin thrower (born 1949)

Barbara Friedrich Parcinski
Sport
- Sport: Track and field
- Event: Javelin throw
- College team: Newark State College
Medal record
Representing the United States
Pan American Games
Gold medal – first place	1967 Winnipeg	Javelin throw
- Updated on April 10, 2016

Barbara Friedrich Parcinski (born 1949) is an American former track and field athlete who competed in the javelin throw. She was a member of the United States team at the 1968 Summer Olympics in Mexico City and was a gold medalist in the javelin at the 1967 Pan American Games in Winnipeg. Friedrich set the U.S. record at 198 feet 8 inches (60.55 m) as a high school senior with a throw in 1967 that also set the national high school record. Due to safety-related changes made to reduce the distance of javelin throws in high school competition, her record is unlikely to ever be exceeded.

== Athletic competition ==
Friedrich attended Manasquan High School in Manasquan, New Jersey at a time before Title IX provided for greater opportunities for women to participate in interscholastic sports, and was required to compete together with the boys' track and field team.

In July 1966, at the National Amateur Athletic Union Women's and Girl's Outdoor Track and Field Championships held in Frederick, Maryland, Friedrich had a throw of 169 feet 6 inches (51.66 m) that exceeded the existing record of 155 feet 6 inches (47.40 m).

At a specially organized event in Long Branch, New Jersey for women held in the spring of 1967 as part of the state invitational Meet of Champions, Friedrich threw the javelin distance of 198 feet 8 inches (60.55 m), well beyond officials who had positioned themselves at a distance of 140 feet (43 m). Friedrich described that she was upset with her coach for ignoring her and used that anger to make a throw much harder than usual that traveled at a low trajectory and was aided by the wind. Meet officials verified that the javelin she used met all specifications and remeasured the field before certifying the distance. She set the United States overall record and the national high school record with the throw. The state record still stands as of 2016, and is 39 feet (12 m) further than the second-ranked U.S. high school distance of 159 feet 8 inches (48.67 m). Safety changes were made in 1999 to limit the distance of javelin throws. Friedrich's U.S. women's record was broken in the 1972 Olympian games, when Kate Schmidt made a toss of 200 feet 6 inches (61.11 m); however, Friedrich's national high school record remains unbroken.

A graduate in the class of 1967, Friedrich was inducted into the Manasquan High School Hall of Fame in 2008.

Friedrich represented the United States at the 1967 Pan American Games, where she won the gold medal. As a member of the U.S. team at the 1968 Summer Olympics in Mexico City, she finished in ninth place in the javelin after suffering an injury to her hamstring.

As a student at Newark State College (now Kean University) Friedrich won the national javelin title in 1970, while also competing in tennis, field hockey and basketball. She graduated in 1972 with a Bachelor of Arts degree in health and physical education in 1972. She was inducted into the Kean University Athletic Hall of Fame in 1981.

== Personal life ==
Friedrich later married Clifford Parcinski. She is a resident of Spring Lake Heights, New Jersey. Friedrich was formerly a teacher in Toms River and has been a track coach.
