= Evelyne Hall =

American hurdler (1909–1993)

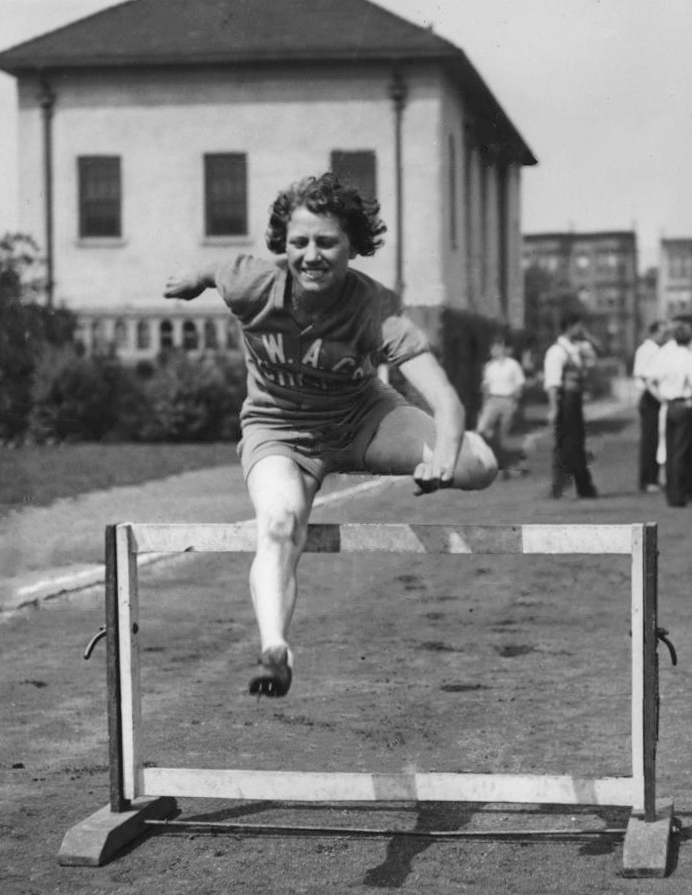
- Hall in 1931

Personal information
- Born: September 10, 1909 Minneapolis, Minnesota, U.S.
- Died: April 20, 1993 (aged 83) Oceanside, California, U.S.
- Height: 5 ft 6 in (167 cm)
- Weight: 128 lb (58 kg)

Sport
- Sport: Athletics
- Event: 80 metres hurdles
- Club: Illinois Women's Athletic Club

Achievements and titles
- Personal best: 11.7 (1932)
Medal record
Representing the United States
Olympic Games
Silver medal – second place	1932 Los Angeles	80 m hurdles

Evelyne Ruth Hall (née Davidson, later Adams, later Butler; September 10, 1909 – April 20, 1993) was an American hurdler. She won the AAU title outdoors (80 m) in 1930 and indoors (50 m) in 1931, 1933, 1935. At the 1932 Olympics she earned a silver medal in the 80 m, losing in controversial fashion to Mildred Didrikson (1). Hall posted at time of 11.7, equal to that of Didrikson, which was a new world record. She placed fourth at the 1936 U.S. Olympic Trials and did not qualify.

After retiring from competitions, Hall worked as a coach and instructor of physical education. She prepared the first American women's athletics team for the 1951 Pan American Games, and for several years headed the U.S. Olympic women's track and field committee. She also worked as a supervisor of the Glendale Parks and Recreation department.

In an interview on November 11, 1991, at the age of 82, Adams claimed to be the "oldest living American Olympic medalist". Given the source of this claim it may be that she was referring to track and field athletes only.
