= Dorothy Dodson =

American track and field athlete

Dorothy Lucille Dodson (March 28, 1919 – June 24, 2003) was a distinguished American track and field athlete whose career spanned the late 1930s through late 1940s; Dodson's specialty was the throwing events. From 1939 to 1949—with the exception of 1940—Dodson participated in every U.S. AAU Outdoor National Championships.

Born in Chicago, Illinois, Dodson won 11 consecutive National Championships in the javelin throw, 1939–49. She also won national titles in the shot put in 1944, 1946, and 1947; adding a national championship in the discus throw at the 1946 AAU Meet. Dodson was also the gold medalist in the shot put at the U.S. AAU Indoor Championships in 1941, 1945, and 1946.

Like so many amateur athletes of the era, Dodson and her contemporaries were denied an opportunity to compete at the ill-fated 1940 and 1944 Olympic Games; a world at war would have to wait for such things. The crowning achievement of Dodson's career came in 1948, when she represented the United States at the Summer Olympics in London. Dodson competed in the shot put, discus, and javelin throw; she was a finalist in the javelin, finishing in fourth place, 10 centimetres (3.9 in) from a bronze medal.

Dodson remains the last United States athlete, male or female, to compete in three throwing events at a single Olympic Games.

Dodson died at the age of 84, in Dunedin, Florida.
