= St. Louis Coliseum =

Convention center in Missouri, United States

Coordinates: 38.634937°N 90.213847°W

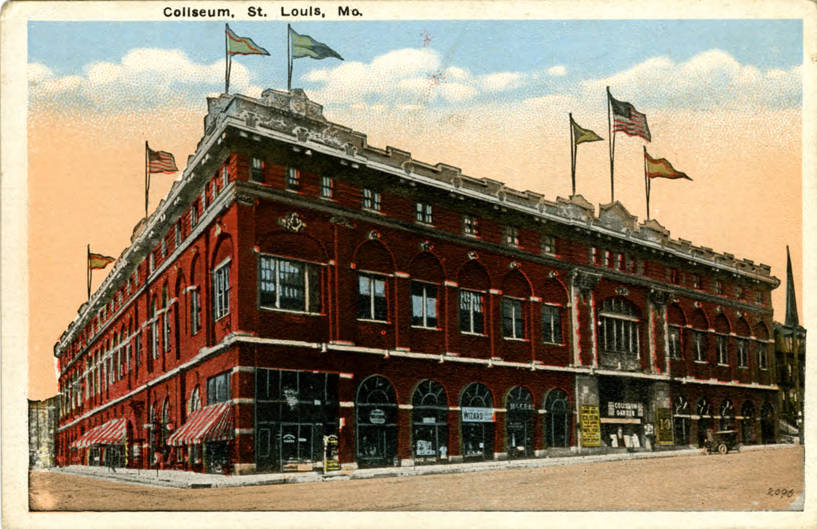
The St. Louis Coliseum

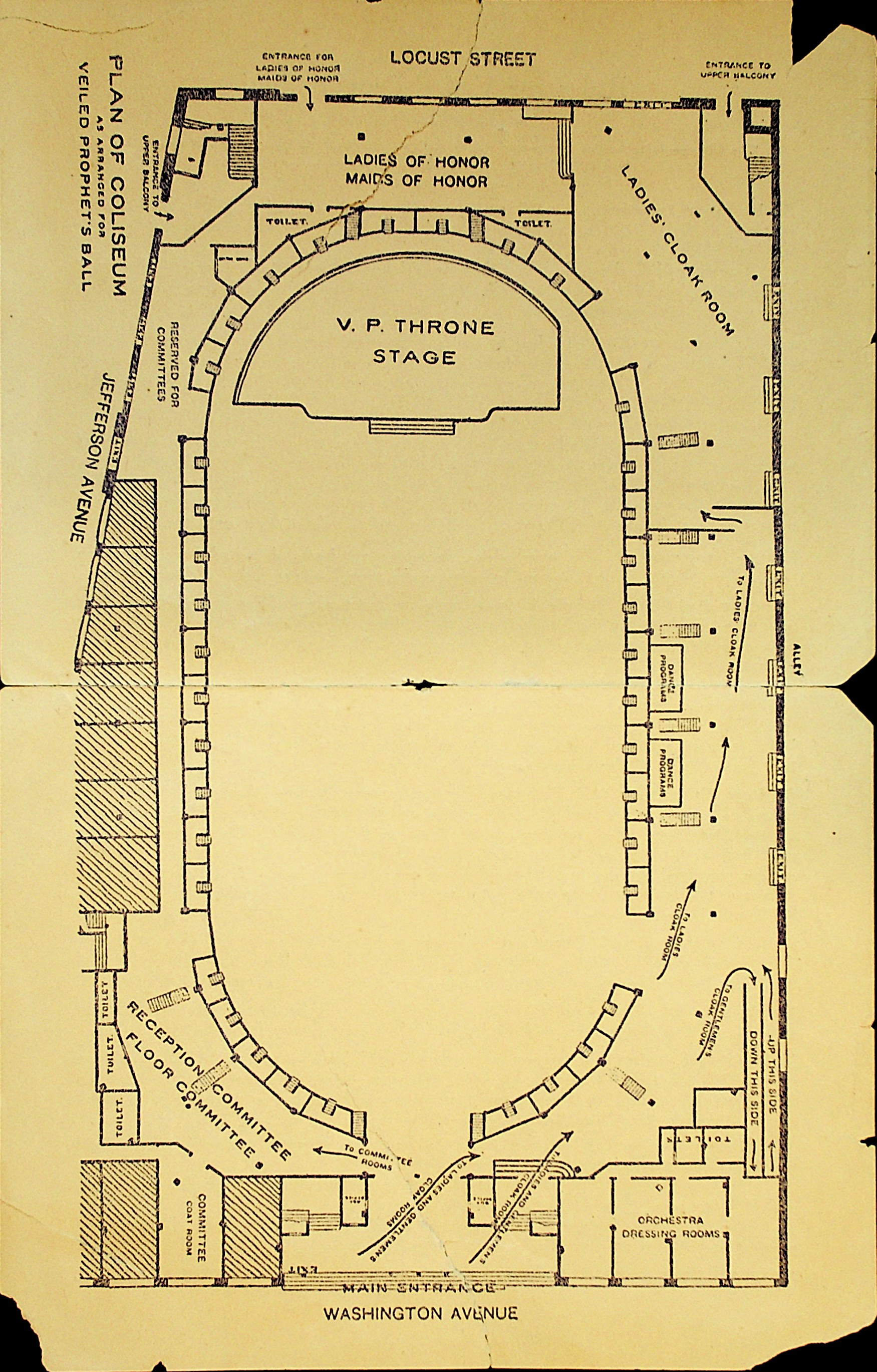
Diagram for the 1913 Veiled Prophet Ball inside the St. Louis Coliseum. The entrance is at the bottom, on Washington Avenue, and the stage setting is at the top.

The St. Louis Coliseum was a venue in St. Louis, Missouri.

The closing of the 1904 World's Fair left the city without a convention center for three years. A group of businessmen led by attorney Guy Golterman assembled $450,000 in private funding, and built the Coliseum at Washington and Jefferson Avenues. It was designed by Frederick C. Bonsack and occupied a full block. When the cornerstone was laid on August 22, 1908, it was claimed the building would be the largest public building in the United States. It replaced the St. Louis Exposition and Music Hall as the city's main convention and big entertainment center.

Golterman was the Secretary to the company and first manager of the Coliseum. Major Maylin Joseph Pickering managed it for some time.

The building accommodated the 1916 Democratic nominating convention, wrestling and boxing matches, trade shows, and musical extravaganzas. Enrico Caruso performed in the Coliseum twice: first with the Metropolitan Opera Company in April 1910 and again in May 1919, giving a concert for Liberty Loans.

Lack of parking, the emergence of neighborhood swimming pools, and Kiel Auditorium, which opened in 1934, effectively ended the usefulness of St. Louis Coliseum. It was closed in 1939, and it was condemned as unsafe by the city in 1953.
