= Nan Gindele =

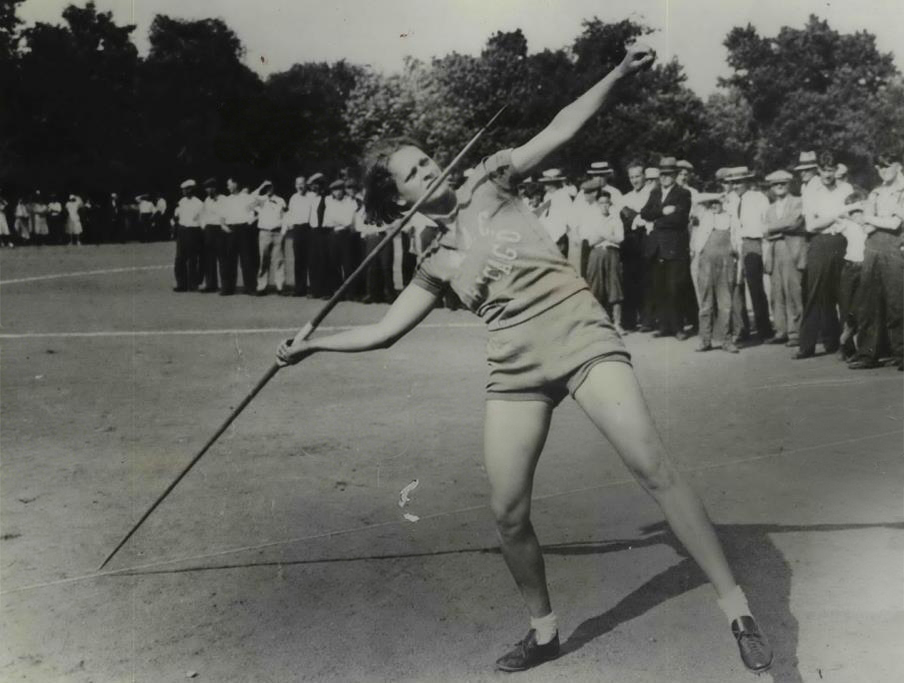
Nan Gindele 1932

Nan Gindele Bauman (August 5, 1910 – March 26, 1992) was an American athlete, excelling in basketball, softball, and track and field. She set the world record in javelin in 1932, which was not broken until six years later. She competed in the 1932 Summer Olympics, the first year that javelin was a women's event at the Olympics. Gindele played on the first two national champion women's softball teams, the Great Northern Laundry team of 1933 and the Hart Motors Girls in 1934. In basketball, she competed throughout the 1930s on many of the top women amateur teams.

== Early life ==
Ferdinanda Kathryn "Nan" Gindele was born in Chicago, Illinois. She attended Carl Schurz High School, graduating in February 1929. There she was captain of the girls' basketball team. She trained as a teacher the Chicago Normal School of Physical Education and Northwestern University.

== Career in sports ==
Nan Gindele taught physical education in Chicago schools, and was a member of the Illinois Women's Athletic Club. Gindele was the national title holder for basketball throw from 1933 to 1936. She set the javelin world record in 1932, at a meet in Chicago, four weeks before the Olympic trials. That record was not broken until 1938.

At the Summer Olympics in Los Angeles in 1932, Gindele placed fifth in javelin; her teammate Mildred Didrikson took the gold medal. Of her fifth-place finish, she told an interviewer later in life, "I was 22, and that was the farthest I’d ever traveled. I was almost too frightened to compete, but I told myself, 'Oh, for goodness sake, just do your best. Just you stand there, even if you don’t want to do this.'"

She competed in the National Track Games in Madison Square Garden in 1933. Although she was mentioned as a possible competitor at the 1936 Summer Olympics in Berlin, and she was still the world record holder for women's javelin, Gindele did not qualify, edged out of qualifying by Gertrude Wilhelmsen.

== Personal life ==
Nan Gindele married a teacher colleague, Milton J. Bauman, and had twin sons. Nan Gindele Bauman died in 1992, aged 81 years, in Barrington, Illinois.
