= Gresham High School (Oregon) =

Public school in Gresham, Oregon, United States

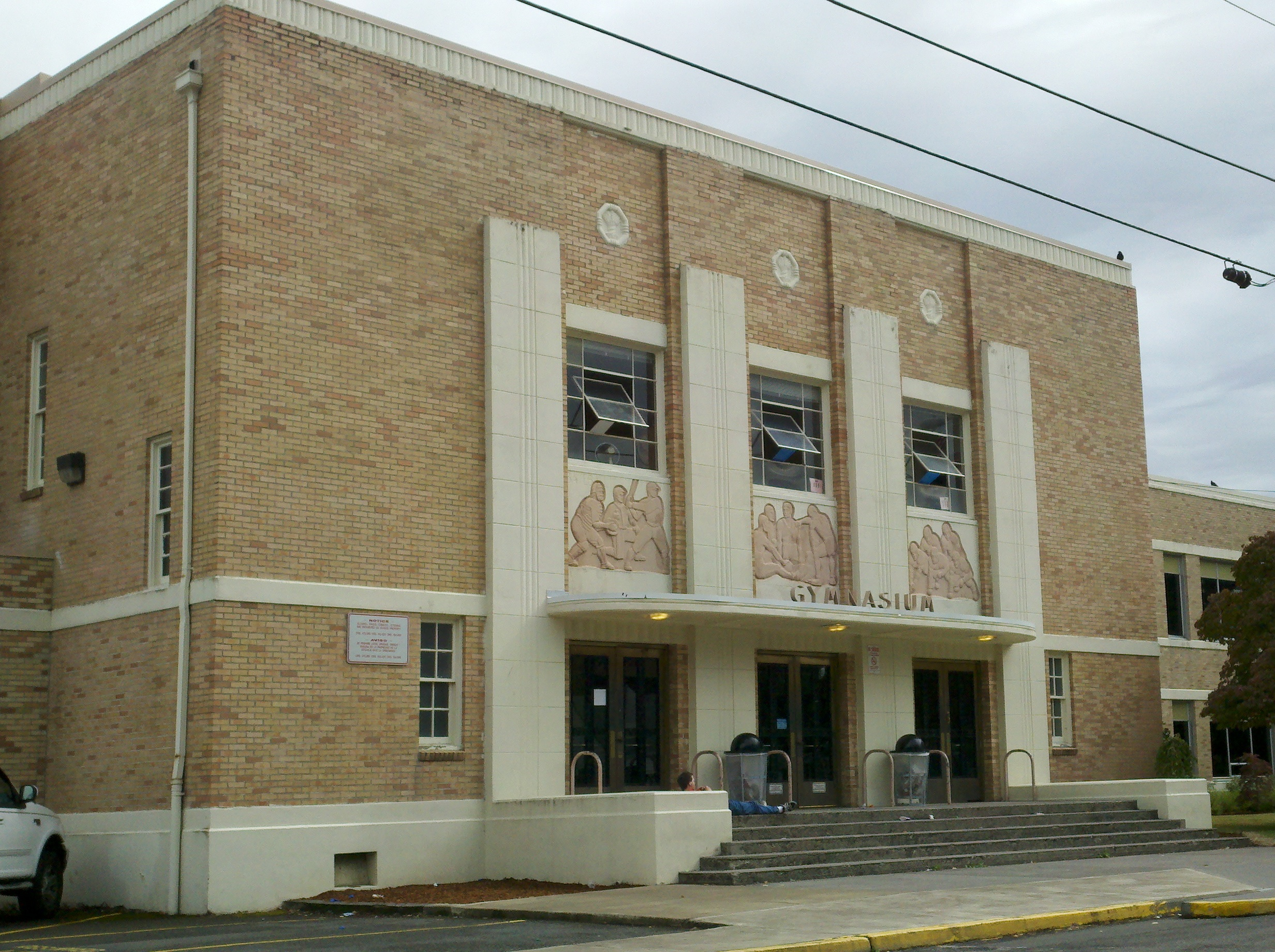
- Gresham High School gymnasium

Location
- 1200 N Main Avenue; Gresham, (Multnomah County), Oregon 97030; United States; 45.505903°N 122.430734°W

Information
- Former name: Gresham Union High School
- Type: Public
- Motto: "Glory, Honor, Strength"
- Opened: 1906; 120 years ago
- School district: Gresham-Barlow School District
- Principal: Aki Mori
- Staff: 71.79 (FTE)
- Grades: 9-12
- Enrollment: 1,685 (2024–2025)
- Student to teacher ratio: 23.47
- Colors: Blue and white
- Athletics conference: OSAA Mt. Hood Conference 6A-4
- Mascot: Gophers
- Rival: Sam Barlow High School
- Yearbook: Munhinotu
- Feeder schools: Clear Creek Middle School, Dexter McCarty Middle School
- Website: http://ghs.gresham.k12.or.us/

Gresham High School (GHS) is a public high school located in Gresham, Oregon, United States. It serves around 1,600 students and was the first high school to open in the city. It is operated by the Gresham-Barlow School District.

== History ==
The school building was completed in 1915 and opened the following school year. Previously, high school classes were taught in a schoolhouse that is on the current site of West Gresham Elementary School. Its first high school classes were taught during the 1902-03 school year and a grade was added each year until the first senior class graduated in 1906.

In 1922, a gymnasium and auditorium were built, followed by a south wing of classrooms in 1936. In 1940, through the Works Progress Administration, the current gym, an updated auditorium, a north wing of classrooms, and an agriculture building were constructed. In 1993, a new Physical Education building was completed behind the grandstands.

In 1971, shortly after extensive remodeling and the addition of a new PE area, the original wooden grandstands were burned down by an arsonist. The grandstands were rebuilt the following year.

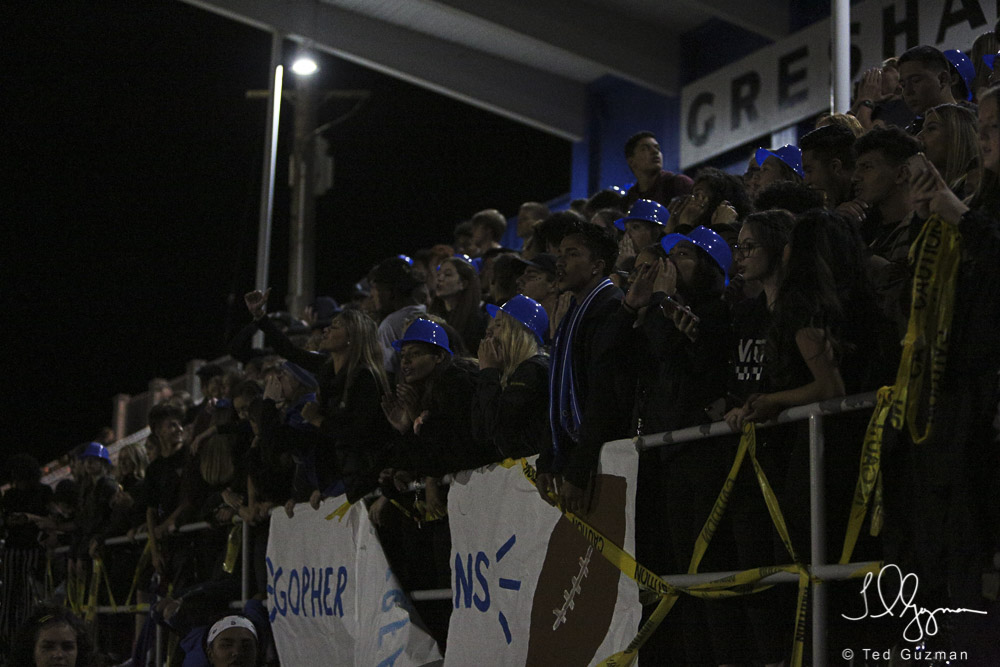
Gresham's stands during a football game, 2018

In 2000, the Gresham-Barlow School District approved a $40.2 million bond, and Gresham High School got an expanded library and counseling office, six new classrooms, a new cafeteria and kitchen, and more. Through this bond, the school district also updated other older buildings and built Springwater Trail High School and the Center for Advanced Learning. In 2016, the Gresham-Barlow School District and the voters of Gresham passed a $291 million bond to replace most parts of the school, with construction beginning in 2018 and ending in 2021. Until the recent remodel, the school still had asbestos tiling and pipe insulation throughout the building and numerous architectural faults.

In 2024, there were calls for the current principal, Erika Beddoe-Whitlock, to step down due to increasing violence on the school grounds.

== Academics ==
Gresham currently offers Advanced Placement (AP) academic programs to prepare students for upper-level courses. Previously, the school was an official International Baccalaureate school offering the IB Diploma Program, but switched to the AP program in 2022.

In 2008, 81% of the school's seniors received a high school diploma. Of 450 students, 366 graduated, 45 dropped out, 15 received a modified diploma, and 24 were still in high school in 2009.

== Sports and activities ==
=== Athletics ===
Gresham's sports teams compete in football, volleyball, soccer, cross country, basketball, swimming, wrestling, dance/cheer, baseball, softball, track and field, tennis, water polo, and golf.

==== State championships ====
- Football: 1982
- Boys' swimming: 1992
- Boys' water polo: 1981
- Girls' water polo: 1982, 1991
- Girls volleyball: 1986, 1988, 1989, 1990, 1991, 1994, 2001, 2002, 2006
- Speech and debate: 2009, 2010, 2011, 2012
- Oregon All High School Drag Racing: 1977
- Rhythmettes Dance Team: 1991, 1999, 2014, 2015, 2016

=== Activities ===
Gresham offers three performing arts programs: theater, choir, and band.

The Theatre Arts Department offers students opportunities from acting in main stage productions, including a full length musical, to directing or working as crew members backstage. Students work with theatre professionals throughout the Portland area, including a residency with Portland Center Stage, and working with influential organist Martin Ellis.

The choir program consists of Encore Choir, Gresham Men's Choir, Treble Choir, Concert Choir, and Overtones. For five years in a row, the Gresham High School Concert Choir placed in the top five in the OSAA State Choir Competition.

The band program consists of 4 bands, with the most advanced being Wind Ensemble. Members of the band perform at home football and basketball games as the Gresham Pep Band, and also marches in the local annual Teddy Bear Parade each September. Gresham's jazz band is offered as a zero period and perform at jazz festivals. Select members also perform in the theaters' productions as part of a pit orchestra.

Although the Gresham-Barlow School District cut millions of dollars from the budget for the 2009-2010 school year, the band and choir programs were able to continue at Gresham High School because of peaceful student protests through song.

== Publications ==
Gresham High School produces two newspapers: The Gresham Argus and The Gopher Gazette. They are produced by separate staffs and are budgeted by their own advertising efforts. The newspapers have different audiences as well; the Gresham Argus is delivered to students in class, and the Gopher Gazette is distributed via postal mail to parents of students and businesses in the community. The Gopher Gazette recently lost funding and had to switch to an online format.

== Notable alumni ==
- Laurie Monnes Anderson (1964), politician, Oregon State Senator representing East Multnomah County
- Brian Crouser (1981), former javelin thrower and Olympian
- Sam Crouser (2010), javelin thrower
- Nikki Fuller (1986), professional female bodybuilder
- Ben Musa, politician, president of the Oregon State Senate from 1963-1964
- Anne Schedeen (1967), actress
- Bob Schloredt (1959), professional quarterback and College Football Hall of Fame member
- Floyd Standifer (1946), jazz musician
