= Sam Crouser =

American javelin thrower (b. 1991)

Personal information
- Born: December 31, 1991 (age 34)
- Height: 6 ft 7 in (2.01 m)
- Weight: 260 lb (118 kg)

Sport
- Country: United States
- Sport: Track and field
- Event: Javelin throw
- College team: Oregon Ducks

Achievements and titles
- Personal best: 83.33 (Eugene 2015)
Medal record
Men's athletics
Representing the United States
Pan American Junior Championships
Silver medal – second place	2009 Port of Spain	Javelin throw

Samuel Crouser (born December 31, 1991) is an American javelin thrower. He is a 2015 alumnus of the University of Oregon.

== High school career ==
While a senior at Gresham High School, Crouser was named Gatorade High School Track and Field Athlete of the Year in 2010. He was also Track and Field News "High School Athlete of the Year." On May 1, 2010, he set the national high school record at 244 ft 2 in (74.42 m). This was broken in 2012 by Billy Stanley of South Park, PA. Sam Crouser set American youth record in Gresham, Oregon on 27 June 2010.

== Collegiate career ==
While a senior at University of Oregon, Samuel Crouser won his second national title at 2015 NCAA Division I Outdoor Track and Field Championships. Samuel Crouser won all four Pac-12 Conference Javelin titles (2012, 13, 14, 15).

== Professional career ==
Sam Crouser won US Javelin title at Junior (U20) US Outdoor Track and Field Championships in 2009 with a toss of 67.18 metres (220.4 ft).

He competed javelin at the 2012 Olympic Trials in Eugene, Oregon. He was ranked #6 in the US three years in a row, 2012 to 2014.

Sam placed 31st in Javelin at 2015 IAAF World Championships in Athletics.

Sam qualified to represent USA in the Javelin at Olympic Trials with a throw of 78.06 metres (256.1 ft). Sam placed 34th in Javelin at 2016 Summer Olympics with a throw of 73.78 metres (242.1 ft).

== Seasonal bests by year ==
- 2007 - 67.18
- 2009 - 72.82
- 2010 - 77.84
- 2012 - 80.80
- 2013 - 78.53
- 2014 - 76.98
- 2015 - 83.33
- 2016 - 78.06

== Personal life ==
His uncle Brian Crouser competed in the javelin throw at the 1988 and 1992 Summer Olympics. In 2011, cousin Ryan Crouser joined Sam, setting the national high school record in the discus throw for cross town rival Sam Barlow High School. Ryan went on to win the Olympic gold medal in the shot put. Then in 2012, sister Haley completed the family trifecta by setting the national high school record in the girl's javelin throw.

Awards
Preceded by Mason Finley	Track & Field News High School Boys Athlete of the Year; 2010	Succeeded by Ryan Crouser
