= Martin Ellis =

Martin Ellis may refer to:

- Martin Ellis (organist), American church, concert and theatre organist
- Martin Ellis (umpire) (born 1969), Australian rules football field umpire
- Martin Beazor Ellis (1911–1996), British mycologist
- Martin Ellis (hurdler) (born 1966), American hurdler, 1989 All-American for the Syracuse Orange track and field team

== See also ==
- Ellis Martin (1881–1977), English commercial artist
