= Cory Leslie =

American distance runner (born 1989)

Personal information
- Born: October 24, 1989 (age 36)

Achievements and titles
- National finals: 2007 USA U20s; • 1500m, 7th; 2008 USA U20s; • 1500m, 3rd (bronze); 2011 USA Champs; • 3000m steeplechase, 12th; 2013 USA Indoors; • Mile run, 3rd (bronze); 2013 USA Champs; • 3000m steeplechase, 10th; 2014 USA Champs; • 3000m steeplechase, 4th; 2015 USA Indoors; • 1000m, 4th; 2015 USA Champs; • 3000m steeplechase, 6th; 2016 USA Indoors; • 1500m, 9th; 2016 USA Champs; • 3000m steeplechase, 7th
Medal record
Men's athletics
Representing United States
Athletics at the Pan American Games
Bronze medal – third place	2015 Toronto	3000m steeplechase

Cory Leslie (born October 24, 1989) is an American distance runner. He is sponsored by Nike and trains with the Furman Elite Track Club. Leslie competes primarily in the 1500 m and 3000m steeplechase, winning the bronze medal at the 2015 Pan American Games in the latter event.

Leslie was raised in Sandusky, Ohio and ran for the Ohio State Buckeyes in college. As of 2023, he coaches the Under Armour Mission Run Distance men’s team based out of Baltimore, MD.

== International competitions ==
Year	Competition	Venue	Position	Event	Notes
2013	Golden Grand Prix	Tokyo, Japan	4th	3000m steeplechase	8:20.08
2013	Stockholm Bauhaus Athletics	Stockholm, Sweden	12th	3000m steeplechase	8:35.30
2013	Gugl Games	Linz, Austria	9th	1000m	2:19.30
2013	DecaNation	Valence, France	2nd	3000m steeplechase	8:39.16
2014	London Grand Prix	London, United Kingdom	12th	2 miles	9:01
2015	Josef Odložil Memorial	Prague, Czech Republic	4th	3000m steeplechase	8:25.74
2015	Athletics at the Pan American Games	Toronto, Canada	3rd	3000m steeplechase	8:36.83
2015	London Grand Prix	London, United Kingdom	13th	3000m steeplechase	8:46.06
2015	Stockholm Bauhaus Athletics	Stockholm, Sweden	10th	3000m steeplechase	8:30.33
2016	Millrose Games	New York, New York	5th	Mile	3:53.87
2016	Golden Gala	Roma, Italy	9th	3000m steeplechase	8:20.43
2017	Millrose Games	New York, New York	9th	Mile	3:57.86

== Domestic competitions ==
Year	Competition	Venue	Position	Event	Notes
2007	United States Under-20 Athletics Championships	Indianapolis, Indiana	7th	1500m	3:53.72
2008	National Scholastic Indoor Championships	New York, New York	3rd	Mile run	4:13.49
2008	Penn Relays	Philadelphia, Pennsylvania	1st	Mile run	4:12.76
2008	United States Under-20 Athletics Championships	Columbus, Ohio	3rd	1500m	3:49.51
2009	Drake Relays	Des Moines, Iowa	3rd	3000m steeplechase	9:05.05
2010	NCAA Men's Division I Outdoor Track and Field Championships	Eugene, Oregon	19th	3000m steeplechase	8:54.38
2011	NCAA Men's Division I Indoor Track and Field Championships	College Station, Texas	8th (Heat 1, Heats)	Mile run	4:03.12
2011	NCAA Men's Division I Outdoor Track and Field Championships	Des Moines, Iowa	10th (Heat 1, Heats)	3000m steeplechase	9:00.68
2011	United States Championships	Eugene, Oregon	12th	3000m steeplechase	8:48.70
2012	NCAA Men's Division I Indoor Track and Field Championships	Nampa, Idaho	6th (Heat 2, Heats)	Mile run	4:07.61
2012	Mt. SAC Relays	Walnut, California	2nd	3000m steeplechase	8:37.59
2012	Payton Jordan	Stanford, California	1st (Race B)	1500m	3:39.00
2012	NCAA Men's Division I Outdoor Track and Field Championships	Des Moines, Iowa	3rd	3000m steeplechase	8:40.98
2012	United States Olympic Trials in Athletics	Eugene, Oregon	9th	3000m steeplechase	8:33.94
2013	United States Indoor Track Championships	Albuquerque, New Mexico	3rd	Mile run	3:59.88
2013	Raleigh Relays	Raleigh, North Carolina	2nd	5000m	13:43.73
2013	Kansas Relays	Lawrence, Kansas	1st	Mile run	3:58.18
2013	United States Championships	Des Moines, Iowa	10th	3000m steeplechase	8:42.37
2014	Payton Jordan	Stanford, California	12th	1500m	3:43.10
2014	United States Championships	Sacramento, California	4th	3000m steeplechase	8:26.30
2015	United States Indoor Track Championships	Boston, Massachusetts	4th	1000m	2:22.54
2015	United States Championships	Eugene, Oregon	6th	3000m steeplechase	8:28.08
2016	United States Indoor Track Championships	Portland, Oregon	9th	1500m	3:49.08
2016	Payton Jordan	Stanford, California	5th (Race B)	5000m	13:38.36
2016	United States Championships	Eugene, Oregon	7th	3000m steeplechase	8:37.54
2017	United States Championships	Sacramento, California	6th (Heat 2, Heats)	1500m	3:43.61
