= 2014 NCAA Division I Outdoor Track and Field Championships =

- Edition: 93rd (Men); 33rd (Women)
- Dates: June 11–14, 2014
- Host city: Eugene, Oregon; University of Oregon
- Venue: Hayward Field
- Events: 36

The 2014 NCAA Division I Outdoor Track and Field Championships were the 93rd NCAA Men's Division I Outdoor Track and Field Championships and the 33rd NCAA Women's Division I Outdoor Track and Field Championships held for the second consecutive year at Hayward Field in Eugene, Oregon on the campus of the University of Oregon. In total, thirty-six different men's and women's track and field events were contested from June 11 to June 14, 2014.

== Results ==
=== Men's events ===
==== 100 meters ====
- Final results shown, not prelims

Rank	Name	University	Time	Notes
1st place, gold medalist(s)	Trayvon Bromell	Baylor	9.97	
2nd place, silver medalist(s)	Dentarius Locke	Florida State	10.02	
3rd place, bronze medalist(s)	Aaron Brown Canada	USC	10.07	10.008
4	Justin Walker	Northwestern State	10.12	
5	Shavez Hart Bahamas	Texas A&M	10.15	
6	Clayton Vaughn	Texas-Arlington	10.19	
7	Desmond Lawrence	North Carolina A&T	10.24	
8	Antwan Wright	Florida	10.24	

==== 200 meters ====
- Final results shown, not prelims

Rank	Name	University	Time	Notes
1st place, gold medalist(s)	Dedric Dukes	Florida	19.91	
2nd place, silver medalist(s)	Aaron Brown Canada	USC	20.02	
3rd place, bronze medalist(s)	Justin Walker	Northwestern State	20.13	
4	Aaron Ernest	LSU	20.31	
5	Everett Walker	Baylor	20.42	
6	Khalil Henderson	Auburn	20.61	
7	Arthur Delaney	Oregon	20.79	
8	Clayton Vaughn	Texas-Arlington	26.22	

==== 400 meters ====
- Final results shown, not prelims

Rank	Name	University	Time	Notes
1st place, gold medalist(s)	Deon Lendore Trinidad and Tobago	Texas A&M	45.02	
2nd place, silver medalist(s)	Michael Berry	Oregon	45.07	
3rd place, bronze medalist(s)	Vernon Norwood	LSU	45.45	
4	Brycen Spratling	Pittsburgh	45.49	
5	Najee Glass	Florida	45.63	
6	James Harris	Florida State	45.64	
7	Christopher Giesting	Notre Dame	46.10	
8	Hugh Graham Jr	Florida	46.65	

==== 800 meters ====
- Final results shown, not prelims

Rank	Name	University	Time	Notes
1st place, gold medalist(s)	Brandon McBride Canada	Mississippi State	1:46.26	
2nd place, silver medalist(s)	Ryan Schnulle	Florida	1:46.29	
3rd place, bronze medalist(s)	Keffri Neal	Kentucky	1:46.39	
4	Patrick Rono Kenya	Arkansas	1:46.46	
5	Eliud Rutto	Middle Tennessee State	1:47.32	
6	Luke Lefebure	Stanford	1:47.64	
7	Chris Low	Long Beach State	1:48.28	
8	Derrick Daigre	Washington	1:50.83	

==== 1500 meters ====
- Only top eight final results shown; no prelims are listed

Rank	Name	University	Time	Notes
1st place, gold medalist(s)	Mac Fleet	Oregon	3:39.09	
2nd place, silver medalist(s)	Lawi Lalang Kenya	Arizona	3:39.13	
3rd place, bronze medalist(s)	Sam Penzenstadler	Loyola University Chicago	3:39.77	
4	Peter Callahan	New Mexico	3:39.90	
5	Jordan Williamsz	Villanova	3:40.25	
6	Grant Pollock	Virginia Tech	3:40.41	
7	John Simons	Minnesota	3:40.57	
8	Michael Atchoo	Stanford	3:40.66	

==== 5000 meters ====
- Only top eight final results shown

Rank	Name	University	Time	Notes
1st place, gold medalist(s)	Lawi Lalang Kenya	Arizona	13:18.36	
2nd place, silver medalist(s)	Edward Cheserek Kenya	Oregon	13:18.71	
3rd place, bronze medalist(s)	Trevor Dunbar	Oregon	13:26.90	
4	Eric Jenkins	Oregon	13:27.41	
5	Mohammed Ahmed Canada	Wisconsin–Madison	13:28.45	
6	Patrick Tiernan Australia	Villanova	13:31.25	
7	Joe Rosa Puerto Rico	Stanford	13:31.69	
8	Kennedy Kithuka Kenya	Texas Tech	13:34.91	

==== 10,000 meters ====
- Only top eight final results shown

Rank	Name	University	Time	Notes
1st place, gold medalist(s)	Edward Cheserek Kenya	Oregon	28:30.18	
2nd place, silver medalist(s)	Shadrack Kipchirchir Kenya	Oklahoma State University	28:32.31	
3rd place, bronze medalist(s)	Mohammed Ahmed Canada	Wisconsin–Madison	28:43.82	
4	Kennedy Kithuka Kenya	Texas Tech	28:46.21	
5	Trevor Dunbar	Oregon	28:53.81	
6	Joe Rosa Puerto Rico	Stanford	28:57.51	
7	Joe Bosshard	University of Colorado Boulder	29:01.23	
8	Parker Stinson	Oregon	29:01.39	

==== 3000 meter steeplechase ====
- Only top eight final results shown

Rank	Name	University	Time	Notes
1st place, gold medalist(s)	Anthony Rotich Kenya	UTEP	8:32.21	
2nd place, silver medalist(s)	Stanley Kebenei	Arkansas	8:35.27	
3rd place, bronze medalist(s)	Ole Hesselbjerg Denmark	Eastern Kentucky	8:38.75	
4	Mason Ferlic	Michigan	8:39.84	
5	Brandon Doughty	Oklahoma	8:41.65	
6	Tanguy Pepiot	Oregon	8:43.26	
7	Caleb Hoover	Northern Arizona	8:43.99	
8	John Prizzi	University of New Hampshire	8:44.02	

==== 110 meter hurdles ====
- Final results shown, not prelims

Rank	Name	University	Time	Notes
1st place, gold medalist(s)	Devon Allen	Oregon	13.16	
2nd place, silver medalist(s)	Aleec Harris	USC	13.18	
3rd place, bronze medalist(s)	Wayne Davis	Texas A&M	13.24	
4	Greggmar Swift Barbados	Indiana State	13.35	
5	Eddie Lovett	Texas A&M	13.44	
6	Vincent Wyatt	Radford	13.60	
7	Durell Busby	Milwaukee	13.70	
8	Trey Holloway	Hampton	13.91	

==== 400 meter hurdles ====
- Final results shown, not prelims

Rank	Name	University	Time	Notes
1st place, gold medalist(s)	Miles Ukaoma Nigeria	Nebraska	49.23	
2nd place, silver medalist(s)	Michael Stigler	Kansas	49.90	
3rd place, bronze medalist(s)	Quincy Downing	LSU	49.97	
4	Timothy Holmes	Baylor	50.07	
5	Rilwan Alowonle	North Carolina	51.06	
6	Keyunta Hays	UTSA	51.65	
7	Josh Taylor	Stephen F. Austin	53.03	
8	Trevor Brown	Colorado State	1:04.02	

==== 4×100-meter relay ====
- Final results shown, not prelims

Rank	School	Competitors	Time	Notes
1st place, gold medalist(s)	Florida	Leg 1: Antwan Wright; Leg 2: Hugh Graham Jr. Leg 3: Arman Hall; Leg 4: Dedric Dukes	38.73	
2nd place, silver medalist(s)	Texas A&M	Leg 1: Shavez Hart Bahamas; Leg 2: Aldrich Bailey; Leg 3: Prezel Hardy, Jr. Leg 4: Deon Lendore Trinidad and Tobago	38.84	
3rd place, bronze medalist(s)	LSU	Leg 1: Nethaneel Mitchell-Blake United Kingdom; Leg 2: Aaron Ernest; Leg 3: Tremayne Acy; Leg 4: Shermund Allsop Trinidad and Tobago	38.85	
4	USC	Leg 1: Aleec Harris; Leg 2: Aaron Brown Canada; Leg 3: BeeJay Lee; Leg 4: Terence Abram	39.30	
5	Western Kentucky	Leg 1: Ja'Karyus Redwine; Leg 2: Ventavius Sears; Leg 3: Emmanuel Dassor Ghana; Leg 4: Elvyonn Bailey	39.43	
6	Iowa	Leg 1: Tevin-Cee Mincy; Leg 2: O'Shea Wilson; Leg 3: James Harrington; Leg 4: Keith Brown	39.55	
7	Arizona State	Leg 1: Ryan Milus; Leg 2: William Henry; Leg 3: Devan Spann; Leg 4: Daveon Collins	39.73	

==== 4×400-meter relay ====
- Final results shown, not prelims

Rank	School	Competitors	Time	Notes
1st place, gold medalist(s)	Texas A&M	Leg 1: Aldrich Bailey; Leg 2: Carlyle Roudette Trinidad and Tobago; Leg 3: Bralon Taplin Grenada; Leg 4: Deon Lendore Trinidad and Tobago	2:59.60	
2nd place, silver medalist(s)	Florida	Leg 1: Najee Glass; Leg 2: Hugh Graham Jr. Leg 3: Dedric Dukes; Leg 4: Arman Hall	3:00.42	
3rd place, bronze medalist(s)	LSU	Leg 1: Quincy Downing; Leg 2: Darrell Bush; Leg 3: Cyril Grayson; Leg 4: Vernon Norwood	3:01.60	
4	Western Kentucky	Leg 1: Christopher Chamness; Leg 2: Emmanuel Dassor Ghana; Leg 3: Ventavius Sears; Leg 4: Elvyonn Bailey	3:03.99	
5	Arizona State	Leg 1: Keith Cleveland; Leg 2: William Henry; Leg 3: Daveon Collins; Leg 4: Devan Spann	3:04.11	
6	Nebraska	Leg 1: Levi Gipson; Leg 2: Drew Wiseman; Leg 3: Jake Bender; Leg 4: Cody Rush	3:04.14	
7	Baylor	Leg 1: Blake Heriot; Leg 2: Timothy Holmes; Leg 3: Drew Seale; Leg 4: George Caddick United Kingdom	3:04.89	
6	Arkansas	Leg 1: Jarrion Lawson; Leg 2: Eric Janise; Leg 3: Travis Southard; Leg 4: Neil Braddy	3:07.26	

==== Men's High Jump ====
- Only top eight final results shown; no prelims are listed

Rank	Name	University	Height
1st place, gold medalist(s)	Bryan McBride	Arizona State	2.28 m (7 ft 5 3/4 in)
2nd place, silver medalist(s)	Wally Ellenson	Minnesota	2.25 m (7 ft 4 1/2 in)
3rd place, bronze medalist(s)	Kyle Landon	Southern Illinois	2.20 m (7 ft 2 1/2 in)
3rd place, bronze medalist(s)	Nick Ross	Arizona	2.20 m (7 ft 2 1/2 in)
5	Justin Fondren	Alabama	2.20 m (7 ft 2 1/2 in)
6	DJ Smith	Auburn	2.20 m (7 ft 2 1/2 in)
7	Montez Blair	Cornell	2.15 m (7 ft 1/2 in)
7	Maalik Reynolds	Penn	2.15 m (7 ft 1/2 in)

==== Men's Pole Vault ====
- Only top eight final results shown; no prelims are listed

Rank	Name	University	Height
1st place, gold medalist(s)	Sam Kendricks	Mississippi	5.70 m (18 ft 8 1/4 in)
2nd place, silver medalist(s)	Shawn Barber Canada	Akron	5.65 m (18 ft 6 1/4 in)
3rd place, bronze medalist(s)	Jake Blankenship	Tennessee	5.55 m (18 ft 2 1/2 in)
4	Peter Geraghty	Eastern Illinois	5.50 m (18 ft 1/2 in)
5	Chase Wolfle	Texas A&M	5.50 m (18 ft 1/2 in)
5	Zach Siegmeier	Minnesota	5.50 m (18 ft 1/2 in)
7	Chris Pillow	Rice	5.50 m (18 ft 1/2 in)
7	Reese Watson	Texas	5.50 m (18 ft 1/2 in)

==== Men's Long Jump ====
- Only top eight final results shown; no prelims are listed

Rank	Name	University	Distance	Wind
1st place, gold medalist(s)	Marquis Dendy	Florida	8.00 m (26 ft 2 3/4 in)	(-0.9)
2nd place, silver medalist(s)	Willie Alexander	Long Beach State	7.73 m (25 ft 4 1/4 in)	(+0.7)
3rd place, bronze medalist(s)	Raymond Higgs Bahamas	Arkansas	7.68 m (25 ft 2 1/4 in)	(-1.0)
4	Laderrick Ward	Edwardsville	7.56 m (24 ft 9 1/2 in)	(+1.9)
5	O'Braxton Drummond	Charleston Southern	7.55 m (24 ft 9 in)	(+0.7)
6	Devin Field	Kansas State	7.47 m (24 ft 6 in)	(+0.5)
7	Corey Crawford	Rutgers	7.42 m (24 ft 4 in)	(-2.4)
8	Patrick Raeder	Nebraska	7.41 m (24 ft 3 1/2 in)	(-0.5)

==== Men's Triple Jump ====
- Only top eight final results shown; no prelims are listed

Rank	Name	University	Distance	Wind
1st place, gold medalist(s)	Marquis Dendy	Florida	17.05 m (55 ft 11 1/4 in)w	(+3.1)
2nd place, silver medalist(s)	Devin Field	Kansas State	16.46 m (54 ft 0 in)w	(+2.7)
3rd place, bronze medalist(s)	Cordairo Golden	Mid. Tenn. State	16.32 m (53 ft 6 1/2 in)	(+0.9)
4	Matthew Oneal	South Florida	16.22 m (53 ft 2 1/2 in)w	(+2.7)
5	Steve Waithe	Penn State	16.14 m (52 ft 11 1/4 in)	(+1.2)
6	Donald Scott	Eastern Michigan	15.99 m (52 ft 5 1/2 in)	(+1.9)
7	Ryan Satchell	Virginia	15.98 m (52 ft 5 in)	(+1.1)
8	John Horton	Houston	15.97 m (52 ft 4 1/2 in)	(+0.4)

==== Men's Shot Put ====
- Only top eight final results shown; no prelims are listed

Rank	Name	University	Distance
1st place, gold medalist(s)	Ryan Crouser	Texas	21.12 m (69 ft 3 1/4 in)
2nd place, silver medalist(s)	Stephen Mozia Nigeria	Cornell	20.46 m (67 ft 1 1/2 in)
3rd place, bronze medalist(s)	Nick Vena	Georgia	20.16 m (66 ft 1 1/2 in)
4	Richard Garrett	UTSA	20.14 m (66 ft 3/4 in)
5	Stephen Saenz Mexico	Auburn	19.78 m (64 ft 10 1/2 in)
6	Stipe Žunić Croatia	Florida	19.67 m (64 ft 6 1/4 in)
7	Filip Mihaljević Croatia	Virginia	19.56 m (64 ft 2 in)
8	Curtis Jensen	Illinois State	19.49 m (63 ft 11 1/4 in)

==== Men's Discus ====
- Only top eight final results shown; no prelims are listed

Rank	Name	University	Distance
1st place, gold medalist(s)	Hayden Reed	Alabama	62.74 m (205 ft 10 in)
2nd place, silver medalist(s)	Julian Wruck Australia	UCLA	62.56 m (205 ft 2 in)
3rd place, bronze medalist(s)	Tavis Bailey	Tennessee	62.14 m (203 ft 10 in)
4	Chad Wright Jamaica	Nebraska	61.93 m (203 ft 2 in)
5	Sam Mattis	Penn	60.33 m (197 ft 11 in)
6	Mason Finley	Wyoming	59.88 m (196 ft 5 in)
7	Eric Masington	Connecticut	59.19 m (194 ft 2 in)
8	Filip Mihaljević Croatia	Virginia	58.86 m (193 ft 1 in)

==== Men's Javelin ====
- Only top eight final results shown; no prelims are listed

Rank	Name	University	Distance
1st place, gold medalist(s)	Sam Crouser	Oregon	76.98 m (252 ft 6 in)
2nd place, silver medalist(s)	Raymond Dykstra Canada	Kentucky	76.72 m (251 ft 8 in)
3rd place, bronze medalist(s)	Jay Stell	Navy	71.30 m (233 ft 11 in)
4	Chris Carper	Robert Morris	71.19 m (233 ft 6 in)
5	Quinn Hale	Washington	70.82 m (232 ft 4 in)
6	Tomas Guerra Chile	Western Kentucky	69.31 m (227 ft 4 in)
7	Evan Karakolis Canada	Rice	68.91 m (226 ft 0 in)
8	MaCauley Garton	Missouri	68.78 m (225 ft 7 in)

==== Men's Hammer ====
- Only top eight final results shown; no prelims are listed

Rank	Name	University	Distance
1st place, gold medalist(s)	Matthias Tayala	Kent State	73.57 m (241 ft 4 in)
2nd place, silver medalist(s)	Nick Miller United Kingdom	Oklahoma State	72.40 m (237 ft 6 in)
3rd place, bronze medalist(s)	Michael Lihrman	Wisconsin	71.24 m (233 ft 8 in)
4	Greg Skipper	Oregon	69.88 m (229 ft 3 in)
5	Tomas Kruzliak Slovakia	Virginia Tech	69.47 m (227 ft 11 in)
6	Alex Poursanidis Cyprus	Georgia	69.28 m (227 ft 3 in)
7	Renaldo Frechou South Africa	South Alabama	67.64 m (221 ft 10 in)
8	Kyle Strawn	Florida	64.87 m (212 ft 9 in)

==== Men's Decathlon ====
- Only top eight final results shown; no prelims are listed

Rank	Name	University	Score
1st place, gold medalist(s)	Maicel Uibo Estonia	Georgia	8182
2nd place, silver medalist(s)	Johannes Hock Germany	Texas	8092
3rd place, bronze medalist(s)	Dakotah Keys	Oregon	8068
4	Garret Scantling	Georgia	7984
5	Zach Ziemek	Wisconsin	7981
6	Alex McCune	Akron	7806
7	Viktor Fajoyomi Hungary	USC	7712
8	Robert Cardina	Penn State	7666

=== Women's events ===
==== 100 meters ====
- Final results shown, not prelims

Rank	Name	University	Time	Notes
1st place, gold medalist(s)	Remona Burchell Jamaica	Alabama	11.25	
2nd place, silver medalist(s)	Morolake Akinosun	Texas	11.33	
3rd place, bronze medalist(s)	Jenna Prandini	Oregon	11.42	
4	Shayla Sanders	Florida	11.42	
5	Olivia Ekpone	Texas A&M	11.43	
6	Jennifer Madu	Texas A&M	11.54	
7	Mahagony Jones	Penn State	11.57	
8	Tynia Gaither Bahamas	USC	11.73	

==== 200 meters ====
- Final results shown, not prelims

Rank	Name	University	Time	Notes
1st place, gold medalist(s)	Kamaria Brown	Texas A&M	22.63	
2nd place, silver medalist(s)	Jenna Prandini	Oregon	22.63	
3rd place, bronze medalist(s)	Olivia Ekpone	Texas A&M	22.64	
4	Mahagony Jones	Penn State	22.68	
5	Morolake Akinosun	Texas	22.89	
6	Tynia Gaither Bahamas	USC	23.05	
7	Ashley Fields	Baylor	23.20	
8	Cierra White	Texas Tech	23.33	

==== 400 meters ====
- Final results shown, not prelims

Rank	Name	University	Time	Notes
1st place, gold medalist(s)	Courtney Okolo	Texas	50.23	
2nd place, silver medalist(s)	Phyllis Francis	Oregon	50.59	
3rd place, bronze medalist(s)	Kendall Baisden	Texas	51.32	
4	Briana Nelson	Texas	51.59	
5	Michelle Brown	Notre Dame	51.70	
6	Margaret Bamgbose Nigeria	Notre Dame	51.72	
7	Robin Reynolds	Florida	5	
8	Kiara Porter	VCU	52.80	

==== 800 meters ====
- Final results shown, not prelims

Rank	Name	University	Time	Notes
1st place, gold medalist(s)	Laura Roesler	Oregon	2:01.22	
2nd place, silver medalist(s)	Claudia Saunders	Stanford	2:02.92	
3rd place, bronze medalist(s)	Ejiroghene Okoro United Kingdom	Iowa State	2:03.37	
4	Megan Malasarte	Georgia	2:03.42	
5	Samantha Murphey	Dartmouth	2:03.82	
6	Amy Weissenbach	Stanford	2:04.16	
7	Sonia Gaskin	Kansas State	2:04.55	
8	Alexis Panisse	Tennessee	2:06.63	

==== 1500 meters ====
- Only top eight final results shown; no prelims are listed

Rank	Name	University	Time	Notes
1st place, gold medalist(s)	Shelby Houlihan	Arizona State	4:18.10	
2nd place, silver medalist(s)	Cory McGee	Florida	4:19.19	
3rd place, bronze medalist(s)	Linden Hall	Florida State University	4:19.33	
4	Emily Lipari	Villanova	4:19.60	
5	Allison Peare	Kentucky	4:19.68	
6	Brook Handler	Michigan	4:20.45	
7	Agata Strausa Germany	Florida	4:20.60	
8	Stephanie Brown	Arkansas	4:20.85	

==== 5000 meters ====
- Only top eight final results shown

Rank	Name	University	Time	Notes
1st place, gold medalist(s)	Marielle Hall	Texas	15:35.11	
2nd place, silver medalist(s)	Aisling Cuffe	Stanford	15:37.74	
3rd place, bronze medalist(s)	Abbey D'Agostino	Dartmouth	15:43.54	
4	Emma Bates	Boise State	15:51.87	
5	Juliet Bottorf	Duke	15:55.94	
6	Dominique Scott	Arkansas	15:57.79	
7	Elinor Kirk	UAB	15:57.96	
8	Kate Avery	Iona	15:58.73	

==== 10,000 meters ====
- Only top eight final results shown

Rank	Name	University	Time	Notes
1st place, gold medalist(s)	Emma Bates	Boise State	32:32.35	
2nd place, silver medalist(s)	Elinor Kirk	UAB	32:32.99	
3rd place, bronze medalist(s)	Juliet Bottorf	Duke	32:37.46	
4	Elvin Kibet	Arizona	32:43.39	
5	Elaina Balouris	William & Mary	32:46.57	
6	Erin Finn	Michigan	32:50.14	
7	Sarah Pagano	Syracuse	33:00.46	
8	Jana Soethout	San Francisco	33:02.02	

==== 3000 meter steeplechase ====
- Only top eight final results shown

Rank	Name	University	Time	Notes
1st place, gold medalist(s)	Leah O'Connor	Michigan State	9:36.43	
2nd place, silver medalist(s)	Marisa Howard	Boise State	9:43.82	
3rd place, bronze medalist(s)	Rachel Johnson	Baylor	9:44.47	
4	Rachel Sorna	Cornell	9:46.96	
5	Shalaya Kipp	Colorado	9:48.90	
6	Grace Heymsfield	Arkansas	9:49.01	
7	Jessica Kamilos	Arkansas	9:49.25	
8	Alexa Aragon	Notre Dame	9:54.27	

==== 100 meter hurdles ====
- Final results shown, not prelims

Rank	Name	University	Time	Notes
1st place, gold medalist(s)	Sharika Nelvis	Arkansas State	12.52	
2nd place, silver medalist(s)	Jasmin Stowers	LSU	12.54	
3rd place, bronze medalist(s)	Bridgette Owens	Florida	12.62	
4	Tiffani McReynolds	Baylor	12.78	
5	Kendra Harrison	Kentucky	12.79	
6	Anne Zagre Belgium	Florida State	12.80	
7	Morgan Snow	Texas	12.81	
8	Le'Tristan Pledgers	Texas Tech	12.94	

==== 4x400-meter relay ====
- Final results shown, not prelims

Rank	School	Competitors	Time	Notes
1st place, gold medalist(s)	Texas	Leg 1: Briana Nelson; Leg 2: Kendall Baisden; Leg 3: Morolake Akinosun; Leg 4: Courtney Okolo	3:24.21	
2nd place, silver medalist(s)	Texas A&M	Leg 1: Shamier Little; Leg 2: Kamaria Brown; Leg 3: Janeil Bellille Trinidad and Tobago; Leg 4: Olivia Ekpone	3:25.63	
3rd place, bronze medalist(s)	Oregon	Leg 1: Christian Brennan; Leg 2: Chizoba Okodogbe Nigeria; Leg 3: Laura Roesler; Leg 4: Phyllis Francis	3:29.09	
4	Florida	Leg 1: Robin Reynolds; Leg 2: Destinee Gause; Leg 3: Loreal Curtis; Leg 4: Ebony Eutsey	3:30.13	

==== Women's High Jump ====
- Only top eight final results shown; no prelims are listed

Rank	Name	University	Height
1st place, gold medalist(s)	Leontia Kallenou Cyprus	Georgia	1.89 m (6 ft 2 1/4 in)
2nd place, silver medalist(s)	Alyx Treasure	Kansas State	1.86 m (6 ft 1 in)
2nd place, silver medalist(s)	Tynita Butts	East Carolina	1.86 m (6 ft 1 in)
4	Shanay Briscoe	Texas	1.86 m (6 ft 1 in)
5	Amina Smith	Maryland	1.86 m (6 ft 1 in)
6	Allison Barwise	Boston U.	1.83 m (6 ft 0 in)
7	Amber Melville	Maryland	1.83 m (6 ft 0 in)
8	Courtney Andrewson	South Florida	1.86 m (6 ft 1 in)

==== Women's Pole Vault ====
- Only top eight final results shown; no prelims are listed

Rank	Name	University	Height
1st place, gold medalist(s)	Annika Roloff Germany	Akron	4.40 m (14 ft 5 in)
2nd place, silver medalist(s)	Kelsie Ahbe Canada	Indiana	4.40 m (14 ft 5 in)
3rd place, bronze medalist(s)	Martina Schultze	Virginia Tech	4.35 m (14 ft 3 1/4 in)
4	Sandi Morris	Arkansas	4.35 m (14 ft 3 1/4 in)
5	Ariel Voskamp	Arkansas	4.20 m (13 ft 9 1/4 in)
6	Katrine Haarklau	Missouri	4.20 m (13 ft 9 1/4 in)
7	Alysha Newman Canada	Miami	4.15 m (13 ft 7 1/4 in)
8	Danielle Nowell	Arkansas	4.15 m (13 ft 7 1/4 in)
8	Sydney Clute	Indiana	4.15 m (13 ft 7 1/4 in)

==== Women's Long Jump ====
- Only top eight final results shown; no prelims are listed

Rank	Name	University	Distance	Wind
1st place, gold medalist(s)	Jenna Prandini	Oregon	6.55 m (21 ft 5 3/4 in)	(+1.2)
2nd place, silver medalist(s)	Sha'Keela Saunders	Kentucky	6.43 m (21 ft 1 in)	(+1.4)
3rd place, bronze medalist(s)	Kylie Price	UCLA	6.43 m (21 ft 1 in)	(+0.9)
4	Lorraine Ugen United Kingdom	TCU	6.40 m (20 ft 11 3/4 in)w	(+2.2)
5	Chanice Porter Jamaica	Georgia	6.32 m (20 ft 8 3/4 in)w	(+2.4)
6	Jazmin McCoy	Nebraska	6.31 m (20 ft 8 1/4 in)w	(+2.4)
7	Sydney Conley	Kansas	6.30 m (20 ft 8 in)	(+2.0)
8	Zinnia Miller	Iowa	6.25 m (20 ft 6 in)	(+1.7)

==== Women's Triple Jump ====
- Only top eight final results shown; no prelims are listed

Rank	Name	University	Distance	Wind
1st place, gold medalist(s)	Shanieka Thomas Jamaica	San Diego St.	14.00 m (45 ft 11 in)	(+1.9)
2nd place, silver medalist(s)	LaQue Moen-Davis	Texas A&M	13.56 m (44 ft 5 3/4 in)	(+0.5)
3rd place, bronze medalist(s)	Ciarra Brewer	Florida	13.49 m (44 ft 3 in)w	(+2.8)
4	Lynnika Pitts	LSU	13.44 m (44 ft 1 in)	(+0.0)
5	Ellie Ewere	Nebraska	13.29 m (43 ft 7 in)	(+1.1)
6	Brianna Richardson	Baylor	13.20 m (43 ft 3 1/2 in)	(+0.0)
7	Dallas Rose	Virginia	13.18 m (43 ft 2 3/4 in)w	(+2.4)
8	Stormy Nesbit	West Virginia	13.03 m (42 ft 8 3/4 in)	(+0.7)

==== Women's Shot Put ====
- Only top eight final results shown; no prelims are listed

Rank	Name	University	Distance
1st place, gold medalist(s)	Christina Hillman	Iowa State	17.73 m (58 ft 2 in)
2nd place, silver medalist(s)	Tori Bliss	LSU	17.48 m (57 ft 4 in)
3rd place, bronze medalist(s)	Kearsten Peoples	Missouri	17.47 m (57 ft 3 3/4 in)
4	Julie Labonte Canada	Arizona	17.27 m (56 ft 7 3/4 in)
5	Dani Bunch	Purdue	17.26 m (56 ft 7 1/2 in)
6	Mary Theisen	Indiana State	17.20 m (56 ft 5 in)
7	Brittany Mann	Oregon	17.07 m (56 ft 0 in)
8	Jessica Ramsey	Western Kentucky	16.79 m (55 ft 1 in)

==== Women's Discus ====
- Only top eight final results shown; no prelims are listed

Rank	Name	University	Distance
1st place, gold medalist(s)	Shelbi Vaughan	Texas A&M	60.02 m (196 ft 10 in)
2nd place, silver medalist(s)	Danniel Thomas Jamaica	Kent State	57.11 m (187 ft 4 in)
3rd place, bronze medalist(s)	Laura Bobek	Oregon	56.29 m (184 ft 8 in)
4	Alexis Cooks	Akron	55.54 m (182 ft 2 in)
5	Kellion Knibb Jamaica	Florida State	55.06 m (180 ft 7 in)
6	Jessica Maroszek	Kansas	54.78 m (179 ft 8 in)
7	Kiah Hicks	Colorado St.	53.50 m (175 ft 6 in)
8	Alexandra Collatz	USC	53.07 m (174 ft 1 in)

==== Women's Javelin ====
- Only top eight final results shown; no prelims are listed

Rank	Name	University	Distance
1st place, gold medalist(s)	Fawn Miller	Florida	58.13 m (190 ft 8 in)
2nd place, silver medalist(s)	Avione Allgood	Oklahoma	55.59 m (182 ft 4 in)
3rd place, bronze medalist(s)	Victoria Paterra	Miami (Ohio)	55.54 m (182 ft 2 in)
4	Maggie Malone	Nebraska	55.24 m (181 ft 2 in)
5	Laura Loht	Penn State	54.41 m (178 ft 6 in)
6	Freya Jones	Georgia	53.07 m (174 ft 1 in)
7	Sabine Kopplin	Virginia Tech	52.84 m (173 ft 4 in)
8	Hannah Carson	Texas Tech	52.45 m (172 ft 0 in)

==== Women's Hammer ====
- Only top eight final results shown; no prelims are listed

Rank	Name	University	Distance
1st place, gold medalist(s)	Julia Ratcliffe New Zealand	Princeton	66.88 m (219 ft 5 in)
2nd place, silver medalist(s)	Emily Hunsucker	Colorado	64.83 m (212 ft 8 in)
3rd place, bronze medalist(s)	Brooke Pleger	Bowling Green	64.48 m (211 ft 6 in)
4	Brittany Funk	Akron	64.29 m (210 ft 11 in)
5	Denise Hinton	LSU	64.25 m (210 ft 9 in)
6	Jillian Weir Canada	Oregon	63.88 m (209 ft 6 in)
7	Sara Savatovic	Kansas State	63.80 m (209 ft 3 in)
8	Erin Atkinson	Baylor	63.01 m (206 ft 8 in)

==== Women's Heptathlon ====
- Only top eight final results shown; no prelims are listed

Rank	Name	University	Score
1st place, gold medalist(s)	Kendell Williams	Georgia	5854
2nd place, silver medalist(s)	Allison Reaser	San Diego St.	5836
3rd place, bronze medalist(s)	Brittany Harrell	Florida	5835
4	Paige Knodle	Northern Iowa	5681
5	Sarah Chauchard	Eastern Michigan	5638
6	Quintunya Chapman	Georgia	5610
7	Lindsey Hall	Montana	5603
8	Xenia Rahn	North Carolina	5558

== See also ==
- NCAA Men's Division I Outdoor Track and Field Championships
- NCAA Women's Division I Outdoor Track and Field Championships
