= 2015 USA Indoor Track and Field Championships =

- Dates: February 27–March 1
- Host city: Boston, Massachusetts, United States
- Venue: Reggie Lewis Track and Athletic Center
- Level: Senior
- Type: Indoor
- Events: 30 (men: 15; women: 15)

The 2015 USA Indoor Track and Field Championships was held at the Reggie Lewis Track and Athletic Center in Boston, Massachusetts. Organised by USA Track and Field (USATF), the three-day competition took place from February 27 to March 1 and served as the national championships in track and field for the United States.

It marked a return to the Reggie Lewis Track as host, after the Albuquerque Convention Center had hosted the four previous editions. The USA Indoor Combined Events Championships was held in conjunction, taking place in the first two days. All events in the first day were part of the combined events competitions. A total of thirty championship events were contested The championships was broadcast live on television in the United States via NBCSN and also broadcast live on the internet by the governing body's "USATF.TV".

As a result of it being a non-IAAF World Indoor Championships year, some non-standard track events were added to the programme. The traditional 400-meter dash and 800-meter run were replaced by a 300-meter dash and 600-meter run. The distance schedule was changed from the usual 1500-meter run and 3000-meter run to a 1000-meter run, mile run and two-mile run. The walks were also contested over a distance of two miles. New championship records were set in all these events, bar the women's two miles for which Lynn Jennings 1986 time (a former world record) remained. Casimir Loxsom's winning time of 1:15.33 minutes in the 1000 m was an American indoor record and Panamerican indoor record. Two championship records were set in the heats of these races: Robby Andrews ran a time of 2:19.85 minutes for the 1000 metres before winning the title, while Ajee' Wilson set a best of 1:26.56 minutes in the 600 m heats but finished last in the final.

Jeremy Taiwo set a championships record in the men's heptathlon with a total score of 6273 points. Reigning women's pentathlon champion Sharon Day-Monroe had her fourth straight win at the meet (a new high for the meet), but was slightly short of her record score of 2014. As a three-time winner of the heptathlon at the USA Outdoor Track and Field Championships, Day-Monroe's victory made her the most successful combined events athlete in American national championships history. Shannon Rowbury managed a double in the mile and two miles, being the only athlete to win twice at the event in Boston.

Three non-championship exhibition events were also part of the programme. A mixed-gender youth 4×200-meter relay between local teams was won by Metropolis Track Club. There were also two masters events: a men's 1500 m was won by John Trautmann in a time of 3:59.47 minutes, and a women's 300 m won by Kathryn McManus in 42.27 seconds. The men's event also saw Anselm LeBourne break the over-55's indoor record with a run of 4:13.77 minutes.

== Medal summary ==
=== Men ===
Event	Gold		Silver		Bronze	
60 meters	Marvin Bracy	6.55	Joseph Morris	6.57	Clayton Vaughn	6.60
300 meters	Manteo Mitchell	32.86 CR	Clayton Parros	33.00	William Shell	33.09
600 meters	Casimir Loxsom	1:15.33 CR NR	Mark Wieczorek	1:16.07	Je'von Hutchison	1:16.32
1000 meters	Robby Andrews	2:21.91 CR	Kyle Merber	2:22.39	Michael Rutt	2:22.44
One mile	Matthew Centrowitz, Jr.	4:01.40	Ben Blankenship	4:02.14	Pat Casey	4:02.85
Two miles	Ryan Hill	8:26.72 CR	Ben Blankenship	8:27.31	Evan Jager	8:27.44
60 meters hurdles	Aleec Harris	7.51	Jarret Eaton	7.59	Jeff Porter	7.66
Two mile walk	Nick Christie	12:42.12	John Nunn	12:44.43	Jonathan Hallman	13:34.69
High jump	Erik Kynard	2.34 m (7 ft 8 in)	Ricky Robertson	2.31 m (7 ft 6 3/4 in)	Jesse Williams	2.28 m (7 ft 5 3/4 in)
Pole vault	Sam Kendricks	5.76 m (18 ft 10 3/4 in)	Chris Pillow	5.60 m (18 ft 4 1/4 in)	Jeffrey Coover	5.55 m (18 ft 2 1/2 in)
Long jump	Will Claye	7.93 m (26 ft 0 in)	Ted Hooper	7.58 m (24 ft 10 1/4 in)	Chris Benard	7.48 m (24 ft 6 1/4 in)
Triple jump	Omar Craddock	16.84 m (55 ft 2 3/4 in)	Chris Benard	16.57 m (54 ft 4 1/4 in)	Chris Carter	16.51 m (54 ft 2 in)
Shot put	Christian Cantwell	20.41 m (66 ft 11 1/2 in)	Bobby Grace	19.19 m (62 ft 11 1/2 in)	Nate Hunter	19.07 m (62 ft 6 3/4 in)
Weight throw	A. G. Kruger	23.41 m (76 ft 9 1/2 in)	James Lambert	23.35 m (76 ft 7 1/4 in)	Andy Fryman	22.74 m (74 ft 7 1/4 in)
Heptathlon	Jeremy Taiwo	6273 pts CR	Austin Bahner	5526 pts	Thomas Hopkins	5513 pts

=== Women ===
Event	Gold		Silver		Bronze	
60 meters	Tianna Bartoletta	7.08	Jessica Young	7.16	Tiffany Townsend	7.23
300 meters	Natasha Hastings	36.52 CR	Jessica Beard	36.65	Shapri Romero	37.44
600 meters	Alysia Montaño	1:26.59	Phoebe Wright	1:28.00	Megan Malasarte	1:28.98
1000 meters	Lauren Wallace	2:40.42 CR	Treniere Moser	2:40.62	Stephanie Brown	2:40.62
One mile	Shannon Rowbury	4:34.40	Katherine Mackey	4:34.83	Rachel Schneider	4:35.85
Two miles	Shannon Rowbury	9:43.94	Jordan Hasay	9:44.69	Brie Felnagle	9:47.73
60 meters hurdles	Jasmin Stowers	7.84	Tenaya Jones	8.03	Tiffani McReynolds	8.06
Two mile walk	Maria Michta-Coffey	13:37.02	Miranda Melville	13:45.05	Erin Gray	14:24.50
High jump	Chaunté Lowe	1.88 m (6 ft 2 in)	Amy Acuff	1.82 m (5 ft 11 1/2 in)	Elizabeth Evans	1.79 m (5 ft 10 1/4 in)
Pole vault	Demi Payne	4.55 m (14 ft 11 in)	Mary Saxer	4.50 m (14 ft 9 in)	Katie Nageotte	4.50 m (14 ft 9 in)
Long jump	Funmi Jimoh	6.37 m (20 ft 10 3/4 in)	Julienne McKee	6.25 m (20 ft 6 in)	Jessie Gaines	6.23 m (20 ft 5 1/4 in)
Triple jump	Amanda Smock	13.28 m (43 ft 6 3/4 in)	Kenna Wolter	13.16 m (43 ft 2 in)	Blessing Ufodiama	13.16 m (43 ft 2 in)
Shot put	Michelle Carter	19.45 m (63 ft 9 1/2 in)	Becky O'Brien	18.34 m (60 ft 2 in)	Jeneva Stevens	18.04 m (59 ft 2 in)
Weight throw	Felisha Johnson	23.45 m (76 ft 11 in)	Jeneva Stevens	23.43 m (76 ft 10 1/4 in)	Amber Campbell	22.48 m (73 ft 9 in)
Pentathlon	Sharon Day-Monroe	4654 pts	Barbara Nwaba	4389 pts	Kaylon Eppinger	4317 pts
