= Gresham-Barlow School District =

School district in Oregon, United States

Location
- Multnomah County, Clackamas County Oregon United States

District information
- Type: Public school district
- Grades: K–12
- Superintendent: James Hiu
- Budget: $166.4 million

Students and staff
- Students: 11,656
- Staff: 1,167
- Athletic conference: 6A-4 Mt. Hood Conference

Other information
- Website: https://www.gresham.k12.or.us/

Gresham-Barlow School District 10J is a school district in the U.S. state of Oregon. It serves the communities of Boring, Damascus and Gresham.

== History ==
In 1994, the Gresham-Barlow Education Foundation was founded to provide money to the district.

== Area ==
In Multnomah County, the district includes much of Gresham and a small portion of Troutdale.

In Clackamas County, the district includes most of the census-designated place of Damascus, a portion of the municipality of Happy Valley, and a portion of the CDP of Boring.

== Demographics ==
In the 2008–2009 school year, the district had 145 students classified as homeless by the Department of Education, or 1.2% of students in the district. As of the 2020 and 2021 school years, about 49% of the district's students are minorities (31.7% Hispanic/Latino, 8.4% two or more races, 3.8% Black/African American, 3.2% Asian/Asian Pacific Islander, 1.2% Native Hawaiian or other Pacific Islander, and 0.8% American Indian/Alaska Native).

== Schools ==
=== Elementary Schools (K-5) ===
- Deep Creek
- East Gresham
- East Orient
- Hall
- Highland
- Hogan Cedars
- Hollydale
- Kelly Creek
- North Gresham
- Powell Valley

=== Middle Schools (6-8) ===
- Clear Creek Middle School
- Damascus Middle School
- Dexter McCarty Middle School
- Gordon Russell Middle School
- West Orient Middle School

=== High Schools (9-12) ===
- Gresham High School
- Sam Barlow High School

=== Charter Schools ===
- Center for Advanced Learning (11-12)
- Gresham Arthur Academy (K-5)
- Lewis & Clark Montessori School (K-8)
- Metro East Web Academy (K-12)
- Springwater Trail High School (9-12)
