= Ryan Crouser =

American track and field athlete (born 1992)

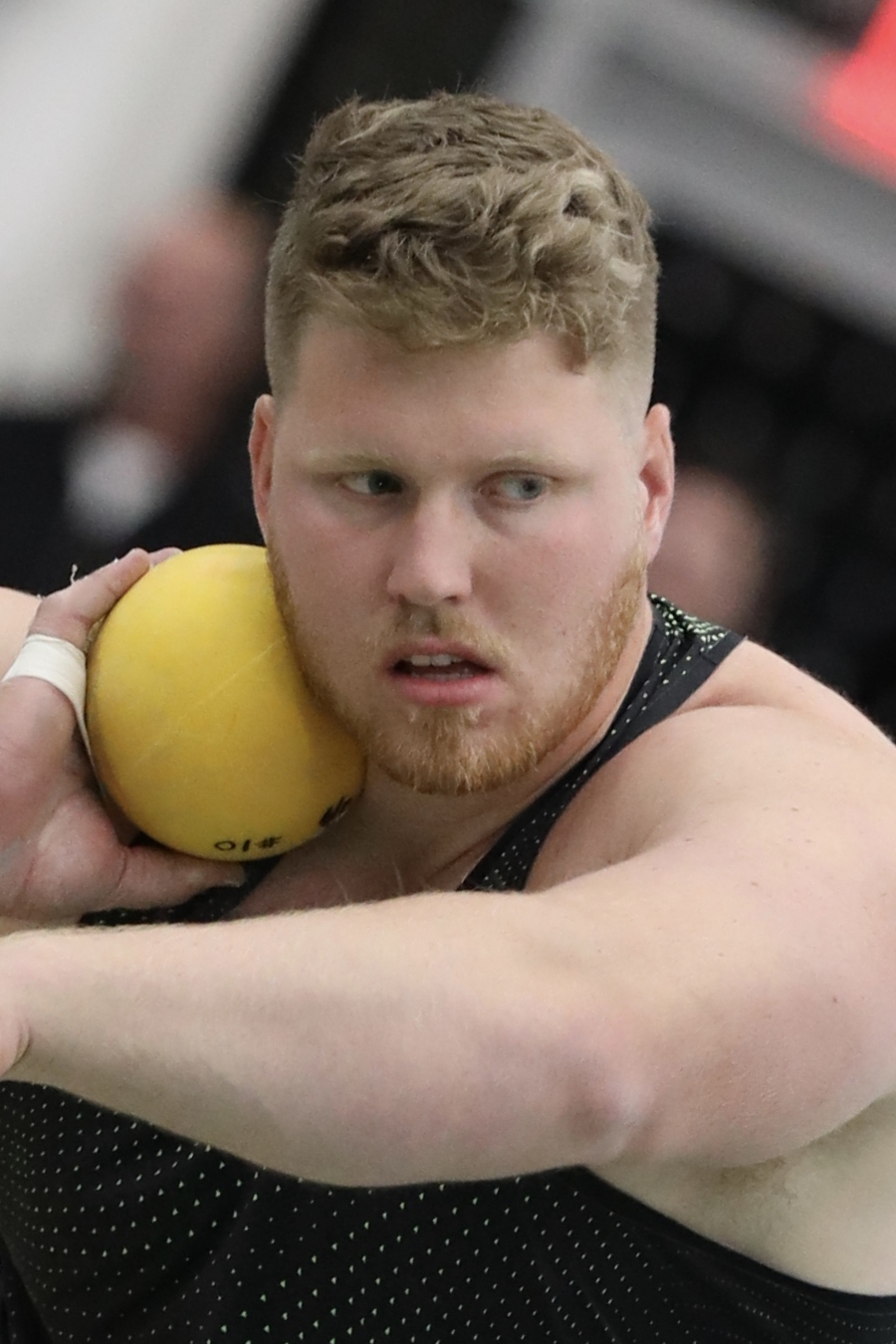
- Crouser in 2019 at the Millrose Games

Personal information
- Born: December 18, 1992 (age 33) Portland, Oregon, U.S.
- Height: 6 ft 7 in (201 cm)
- Weight: 320 lb (145 kg)

Sport
- Country: United States
- Sport: Track and field
- Events: Shot put Discus throw
- College team: Texas Longhorns
- Club: Nike

Achievements and titles
- Highest world ranking: 1st (Shot put, 2023)
- Personal bests: SP: 23.56 m (2023); DT: 63.90 m (2014); JT: 61.16 m (2008)
Medal record
Men's athletics
Representing the United States
Olympic Games
Gold medal – first place	2016 Rio de Janeiro	Shot put
Gold medal – first place	2020 Tokyo	Shot put
Gold medal – first place	2024 Paris	Shot put
World Championships
Gold medal – first place	2022 Eugene	Shot put
Gold medal – first place	2023 Budapest	Shot put
Gold medal – first place	2025 Tokyo	Shot put
Silver medal – second place	2019 Doha	Shot put
World Indoor Championships
Gold medal – first place	2024 Glasgow	Shot put
Silver medal – second place	2022 Belgrade	Shot put
World Youth Championships
Gold medal – first place	2009 Bressanone	Shot put
Silver medal – second place	2009 Bressanone	Discus throw

Ryan Crouser (born December 18, 1992) is an American track and field athlete who competes in the shot put and discus. He specializes in the shot put, in which he is the only three-time Olympic gold medalist, having won in Rio de Janeiro, Tokyo and Paris, and also a three-time outdoor World Champion. He holds the world record in the shot put, both indoors and outdoors. He set the outdoor world record at 23.56 meters in May 2023, improving upon his previous record of 23.37 m from July 2021. He has held the indoor record of 22.82 m since January 2021.

In his early career, Crouser set a national high school record for the indoor shot put and outdoor discus, and he won gold in the shot put at the 2009 World Youth Championships. At the University of Texas at Austin, he won four NCAA titles in the shot put. He won the national title in the shot put at the USA Outdoor Track and Field Championships seven of the eight times the event was held between 2016 and 2024. He is also a four-time national champion in the indoor shot put at the USA Indoor Track and Field Championships, winning in 2019, 2020, 2022, and 2024.

Crouser won his first Olympic gold medal at the 2016 Rio de Janeiro Olympics with a throw of 22.52 m and retained his title at the 2020 Tokyo Olympics, setting an Olympic record of 23.30 m. He also won the gold medal at the 2024 Paris Olympics with a throw of 22.90 m. At the 2019 World Championships in Doha, he won a silver medal. Crouser then went on to win gold at both the 2022 World Championships in Eugene and the 2023 World Championships in Budapest. His throw of 23.51 m in Budapest set a record for the farthest throw ever at a World Championships.

Crouser has been named Track & Field News World Male Athlete of the Year. He was also awarded USA Track & Field's highest accolade, the Jesse Owens Award, and was twice a finalist for Male Track and Field World Athlete of the Year by World Athletics, the international governing body for track and field. Crouser holds the distinction of earning victories in a Diamond League Championship, Olympic Games, World Indoor Championship, World Outdoor Championship, and World Youth Championship.

== Early life and youth competition ==
Crouser was born on December 18, 1992 in Portland, Oregon, and raised in the neighboring rural area of Boring. He comes from a family with a background in throwing events. His father, Mitch Crouser, was an alternate on the 1984 Olympic discus team. His uncle, Brian Crouser, competed in two Olympics in the javelin, while his other uncle, Dean Crouser, excelled in shot put and discus. His cousins, Sam and Haley Crouser, are also javelin throwers. He started participating in track and field in the fifth grade and was competing at a high level when he reached high school.

In 2009, his sophomore year at Sam Barlow High School in Gresham, Oregon, Crouser set a national sophomore record with the 1.62 kg (3.58 lb) discus, throwing 61.72 m. This mark was also the Oregon high school state record until Sam Crouser broke it the following year. Crouser won both the 5 kg shot put and the 1.5 kg discus at the 2009 National Youth Championships. This performance qualified him to represent the United States in both events at the 2009 World Youth Championships in Bressanone, Italy. There, he won gold in shot put with a championship record throw of 21.56 m and silver in discus.

In his senior year in 2011, Crouser broke the national high school indoor record in the 5.44 kg (12 lb) shot put with a throw of 23.54 m. This performance marked a rebound from Crouser's junior year, when he was hampered by a foot injury. As a senior, Crouser also broke the national high school record in the discus by throwing 72.40 m to break Mason Finley's record from 2009. After graduating from Barlow High School in 2011, Crouser enrolled at the University of Texas at Austin, rather than keep with his family's tradition of attending the University of Oregon.

== Collegiate competition ==
Crouser competed for the University of Texas at Austin from 2012 to 2016, where he won four NCAA titles in the shot put. As a freshman, he dealt with a torn ligament in his throwing hand and illness, leading him to redshirt the 2013 indoor season. His first title came as a sophomore at the 2013 NCAA Outdoor Championships, where he threw 21.09 m. Crouser, who had been successful academically, began to struggle with the heavy workload during his second year and opted to switch his major from engineering to economics.

In his third year at the university, Crouser won another national title in the shot put at the 2014 NCAA Indoor Championships in March, throwing 21.21 m to defeat Stephen Mozia (20.06 m). The following summer, the 21-year-old won his third national title in the shot put at the 2014 NCAA Outdoor Championships, recording a mark of 21.12 m. During this event, Crouser injured his left foot on his final throw after it collided with the toe board of the shot circle, leading him to withdraw from the discus event at these championships. In his fourth year, he placed second behind Stipe Žunić at the 2015 NCAA Indoor Championships, reaching 20.93 m on his best attempt to Žunić's 21.11 m. At the 2015 NCAA Outdoor Championships, Crouser placed fifth in both the shot put and the discus.

Due to red-shirting the 2013 indoor season, Crouser had one more winter of collegiate eligibility left, which he used for the 2016 indoor season. The fifth-year senior recorded a personal best of 21.73 m at the 2016 Big 12 Indoor Championships. This performance matched Ryan Whiting's 2008 collegiate indoor record and was the farthest throw in the event so far that year. Later that winter, Crouser won his second collegiate indoor title and fourth title overall with his victory at the 2016 NCAA Indoor Championships. In June 2016, he was named a semi-finalist for the Bowerman, an award given by the U.S. Track & Field and Cross Country Coaches Association to the year's outstanding student-athlete.

== Senior competition ==
=== 2016–2018: Gold medal at the Rio Olympics ===
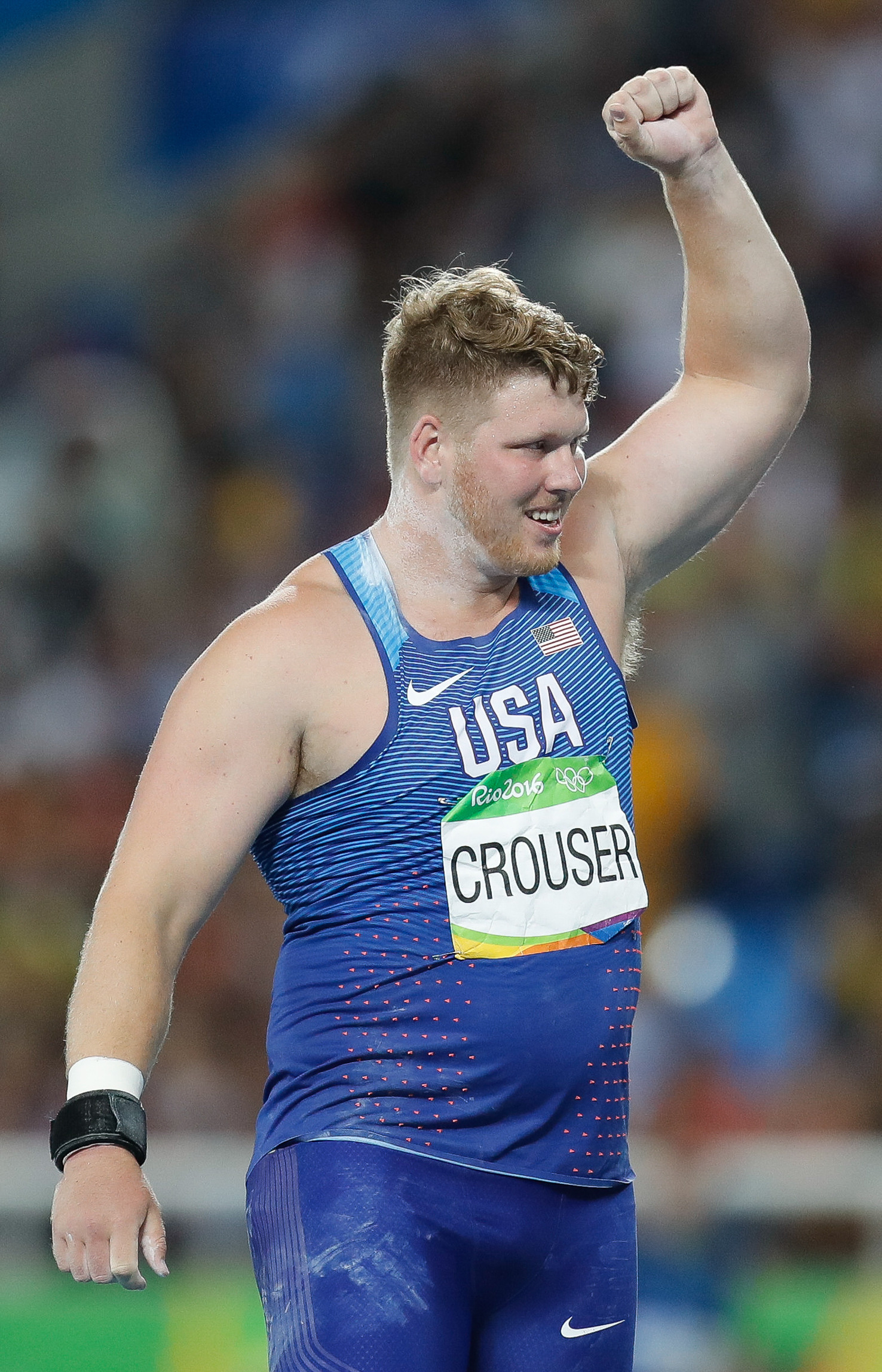
Crouser raises his fist in victory.

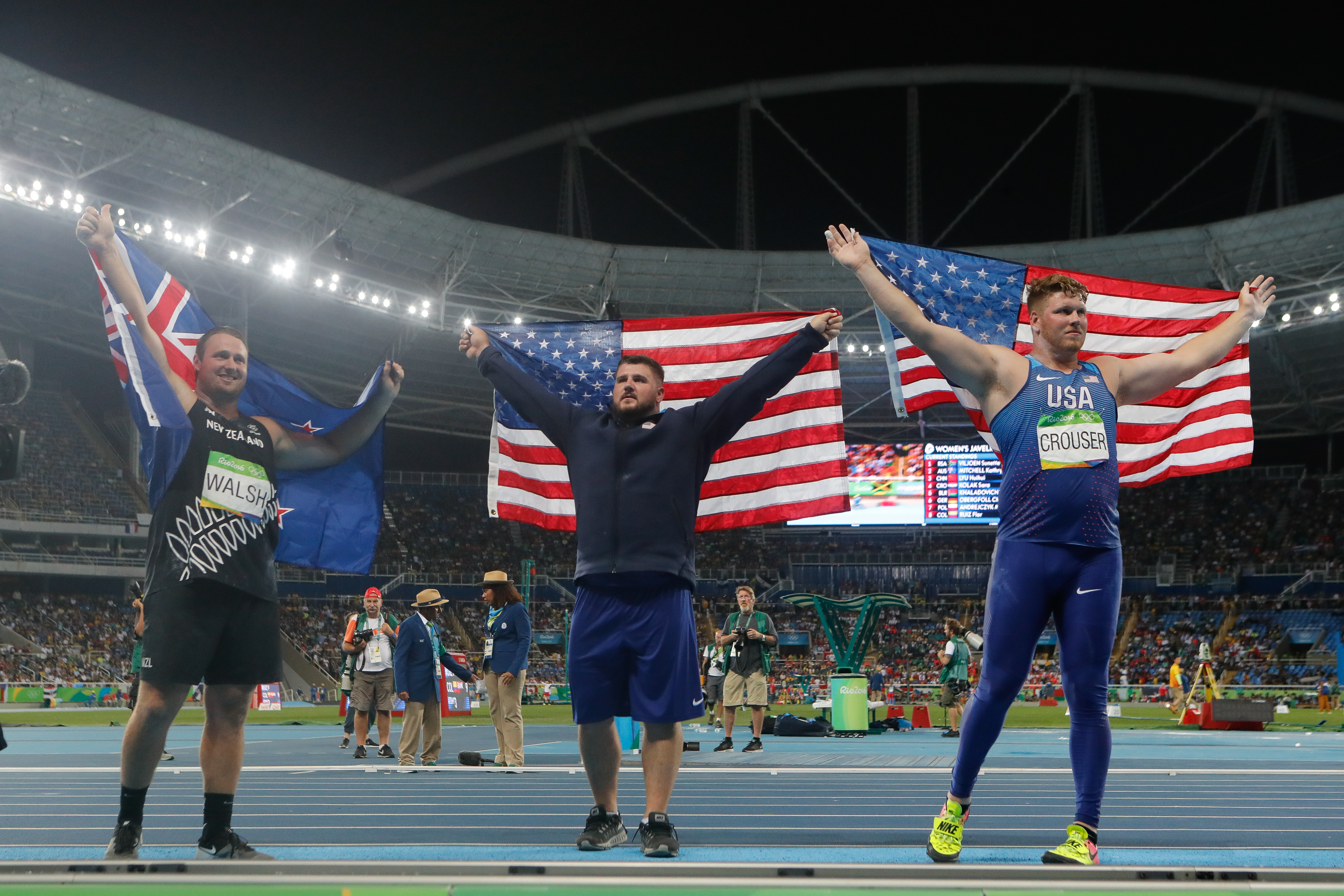
Tomas Walsh (left), Joe Kovacs (center), and Crouser (right)

Crouser wins the shot put final at the 2016 Summer Games in Rio de Janeiro

While preparing for the 2016 US Olympics trials, Crouser pursued a master's degree in finance at the University of Texas. He trained under Mac Wilkins, a former Olympic champion in the discus. At the trials, Crouser defeated the reigning world champion, Joe Kovacs, to win his first national title and qualify for the 2016 Summer Olympics in Rio de Janeiro. On August 8, Crouser won the gold medal in the event, setting an Olympic record with his throw of 22.52 m. He was the first American man to win the event since 2004.

Crouser won another national title in the shot put in June 2017 and competed in the event at the 2017 World Championships in London, where he finished sixth. At the 2018 USA Outdoor Championships on June 23, he placed second with a throw of 20.99 m, behind Darrell Hill's 21.57 m. In the 2018 Diamond League, an annual series of international competitions, he won in Eugene with a throw of 22.53 m, in Monaco with 22.05 m, and in Zagreb with 22.09 m.

=== 2019: Silver medalist in Doha ===
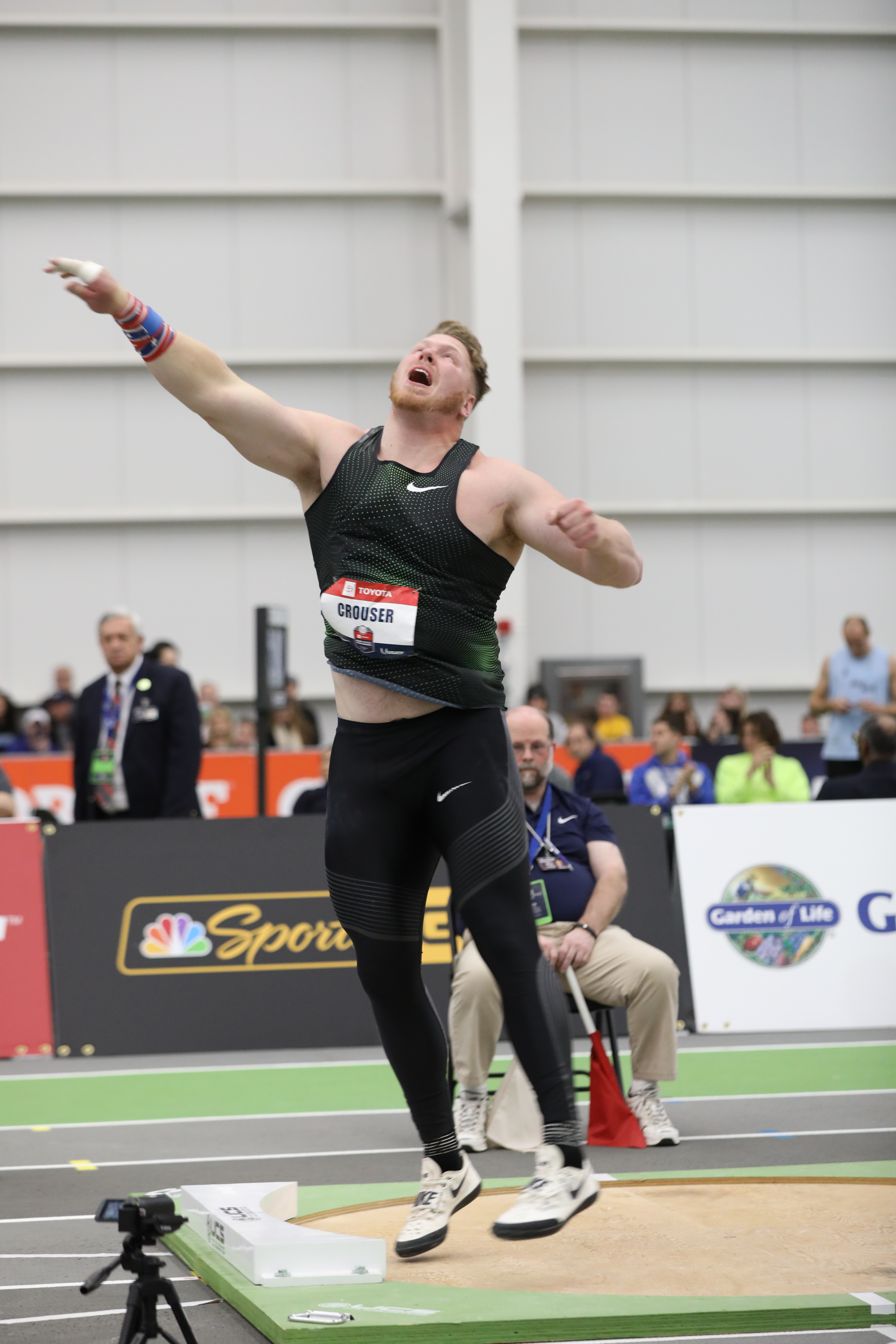
Crouser at the 2019 USA Indoor Championships

Crouser began competition in 2019 with a victory at the Millrose Games in New York on February 9, where he threw 22.33 m. He followed this performance with another victory at the 2019 USA Indoor Championships on the February 23. In July, he won a national title at the 2019 USA Outdoor Championships, qualifying him for the 2019 World Championships in Qatar. At the World Championships on October 5, Crouser threw a personal best (22.90 m) to finish behind Joe Kovacs (22.91 m), in what World Athletics called the "greatest – and closest – shot put competition ever".

=== 2020: Fourth best throw ever amid COVID-19 pandemic ===
Crouser started the year with victories in the shot put at the Millrose Games and the 2020 USA Indoor Championships. His competition schedule was halted until July due to the COVID-19 pandemic, which caused the postponement of the 2020 Summer Games and the disruption of the international sports calendar. To cope with the frustration of these shutdowns and maintain his competitive edge, Crouser took part in bass fishing tournaments. He also built his own shot put ring near his home. On July 19, he resumed competition at the American Track League Meet, setting a personal best of 22.91 m and the fourth best mark in history. Crouser ended the year undefeated in all 10 meets in which he participated.

=== 2021: World record and gold medal at the Tokyo Olympics ===
On January 24, Crouser set a world record for the indoor shot put at the American Track League meet. His throw of 22.82 m bested the previous record of 22.66 m that was set by Randy Barnes in 1989. The 28-year old recorded another world record at the 2020 US Olympic trials in July 2021. He threw 23.37 m, eclipsing the previous outdoor world record of 23.12 m held by Barnes since 1990. His record-breaking throw was ratified by World Athletics on August 11, 2021. At the 2020 Summer Games in Tokyo, Crouser defended his Olympic title, while setting an Olympic record of 23.30 m. Out of his six throws at these Games, three exceeded the previous Olympic record.

Crouser was named the World Male Athlete of the Year by Track & Field News and received the Jesse Owens Award from USA Track & Field. He was also a finalist for the World Athlete of the Year by World Athletics. His achievements in 2021 included the three farthest throws in history, nine of the top ten marks of the year, maintaining an undefeated streak since 2019, and winning the Diamond League final. He also reached a career total of 163 throws over 22 m by the end of the season, the highest ever recorded and accounting for more than a third of all 22-m throws in the history of the sport.

=== 2022: Gold medalist in Eugene ===
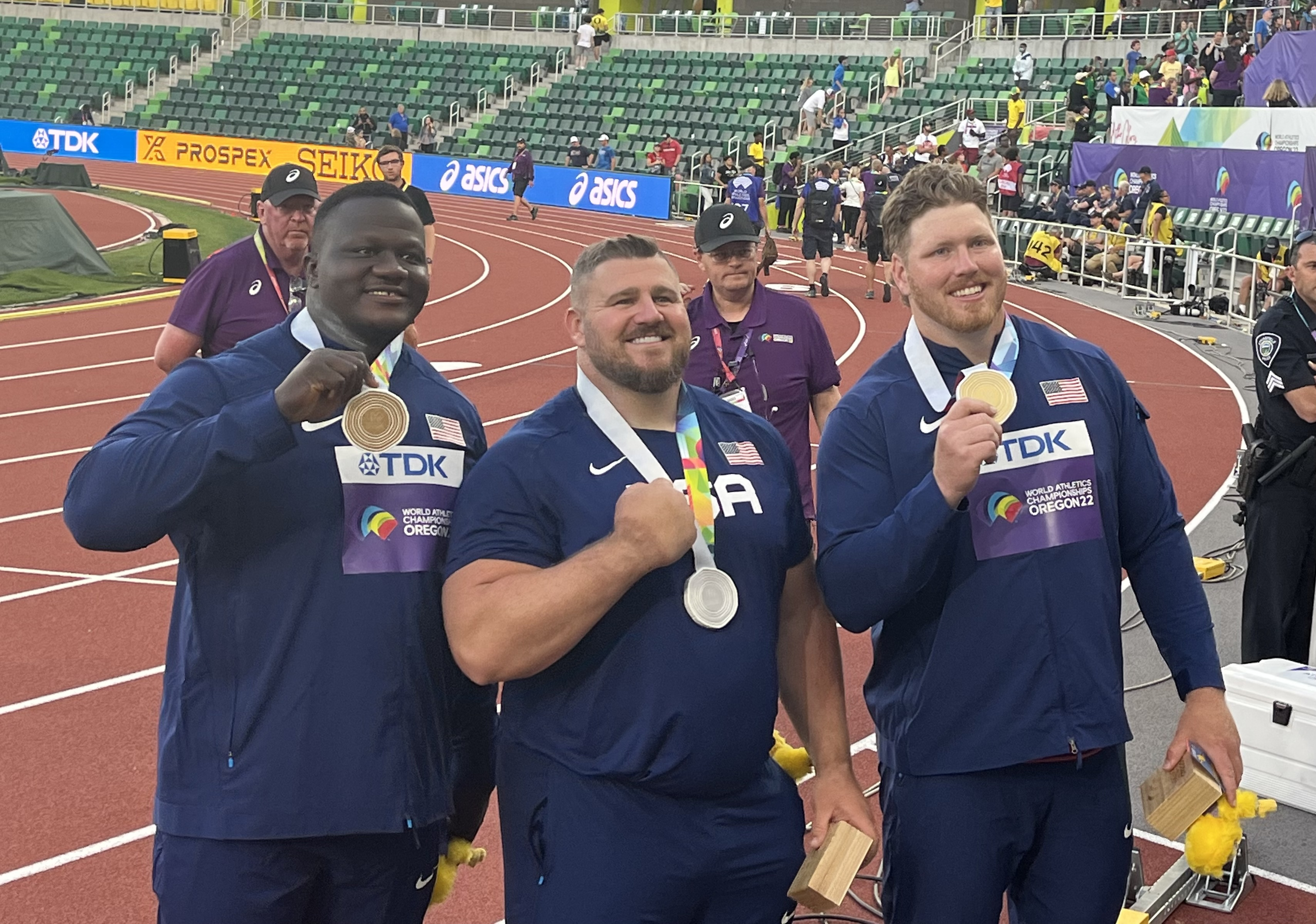
Josh Awotunde (left), Joe Kovacs (center), and Crouser (right)

On February 27, Crouser finished first in the shot put at the 2022 USA Indoor Track and Field Championships. The following month, the American traveled to Serbia to contest the event at the 2022 World Athletics Indoor Championships. He earned a silver medal, behind Brazilian Darlan Romani. Crouser's performance came amid nerve-related issues in his throwing arm. The following summer, on June 24, the 29-year old won a national title in the shot put, which qualified him to participate in the event at the 2022 World Championships in Eugene. Later that month at the world championships, Crouser won his first world title in the event with a throw of 22.94 m. His victory led an American sweep of the podium, with Joe Kovacs and Josh Awotunde taking silver and bronze.

=== 2023: World record and gold medalist in Budapest ===
In 2023, Crouser bettered his own world record in the shot put, earned gold at the 2023 World Championships, and won 13 of his 14 competitions. His world record came on May 27 at the Los Angeles Grand Prix, where he threw 23.56 m. The 30-year old attributed the performance to his development of a new technique, which he refers to as the "step-across". This method adds a lateral stepping motion across the throwing circle that is designed to optimize balance and power. On July 9, Crouser won another national title in the shot put at the 2023 USA Outdoor Track and Field Championships. This performance qualified him to represent the United States at 2023 World Championships later that month in Budapest, Hungary. Before he left for Budapest, a medical exam uncovered two blood clots in Crouser's legs, and he began taking blood thinners to reduce the risk of complications while competing. In Budapest, Crouser won his second world title and established a World Championship record of 23.51 m. The American finished his season at the Prefontaine Classic on September 17, where he experienced his first loss of the year to Joe Kovacs. Following the season, World Athletics announced Crouser as a finalist for World Athlete of the Year.

=== 2024: Gold medalist in Glasgow and Paris ===
In February, Crouser won his fourth national title in the indoor shot put at the 2024 USA Indoor Track and Field Championships in Albuquerque, with a mark of 22.80 m. This throw qualified him for the 2024 World Athletics Indoor Championship, where he put the shot 22.77 m to win the first World Indoor Championship of his career. Crouser's throw was 70 cm farther than the second-place finisher, Tom Walsh. At the 2024 Olympic Trials in June, Crouser won his seventh national title in the shot put, defeating second-place finisher Joe Kovacs and earning another berth to the Olympic Games.

At the 2024 Olympic Games, Crouser won the shot put, becoming the first athlete to win gold medals in the event at three consecutive Games. The victory came after Crouser dealt with injury earlier in the year. Marcus Thompson of The Athletic wrote: "What makes this one extra special is Crouser, at one point this year, thought his career was over".

=== 2025: Threepeat at Worlds ===
Crouser spearheaded the creation of the World Shot Put Series, with the inaugural event taking place in April 2025. The event featured a unique format, in which athletes needed to best competitors to avoid eliminations. Crouser finished fifth in the competition.

At the 2025 World Championships, Crouser defended his title with his fifth throw at 22.34 m, which made him one of only two athletes (after Werner Günthör) to win three consecutive gold medals at the Worlds in this event.

== Training regimen and coaching ==
Crouser's training regimen consists of 20- to 40-meter sprints three times a week and three weekly sessions of dynamic jumping exercises like box jumps and bounding to enhance his agility and power. He also uses an agility ladder to improve his footwork. For his core discipline, he practices shot put four to five times a week. Each session involves 20 to 40 throws and lasts 90 to 120 minutes. Crouser draws training techniques from MMA and baseball pitching by using similarities in rotational power and body mechanics to increase the velocity and energy transfer in his throws. He has also incorporated radar technology to refine his throws. The technology, traditionally used by golfers to track their shots, enables Crouser to measure the angle and velocity of his throws.

In terms of nutrition, Crouser consumes around 5,500 to 6,000 calories daily during the competitive season. His diet is structured into five meals of approximately 1,000 calories each, which he supplements by snacking to maintain consistent levels of energy. His meals mainly consist of lean proteins, including chicken and ground beef, along with brown rice and quinoa. In an interview with GQ, he talked about the nutritional requirements to support his 6'7, 320 pound frame: "Food is almost a part of training for me. I'm eating on a set schedule that makes sure I never get hungry." He also stated that he follows each of his five daily meals with 16 ounces of milk, amounting to half a gallon a day.

In December 2019, Crouser moved from the United States Olympic Training Center in San Diego to the University of Arkansas in Fayetteville, where he took a position as a volunteer coach for the men's track and field team. Crouser has described being a coach of college students as helping him to stay excited about competing and to maintain a positive outlook. In March 2024, he stated, "It can be helpful to have the college kids there for perspective. I was in their shoes once, and look at far how I've come." At the 2024 Summer Olympics, one of his Razorback mentees, Rojé Stona, broke the Olympic record in the men's discus throw to win the gold medal.

== Personal life ==
Crouser became engaged in 2024 to the former Dr. Megan Clark. They married in 2025.

== Achievements ==
All statistics from athlete's profile on World Athletics, unless otherwise noted.

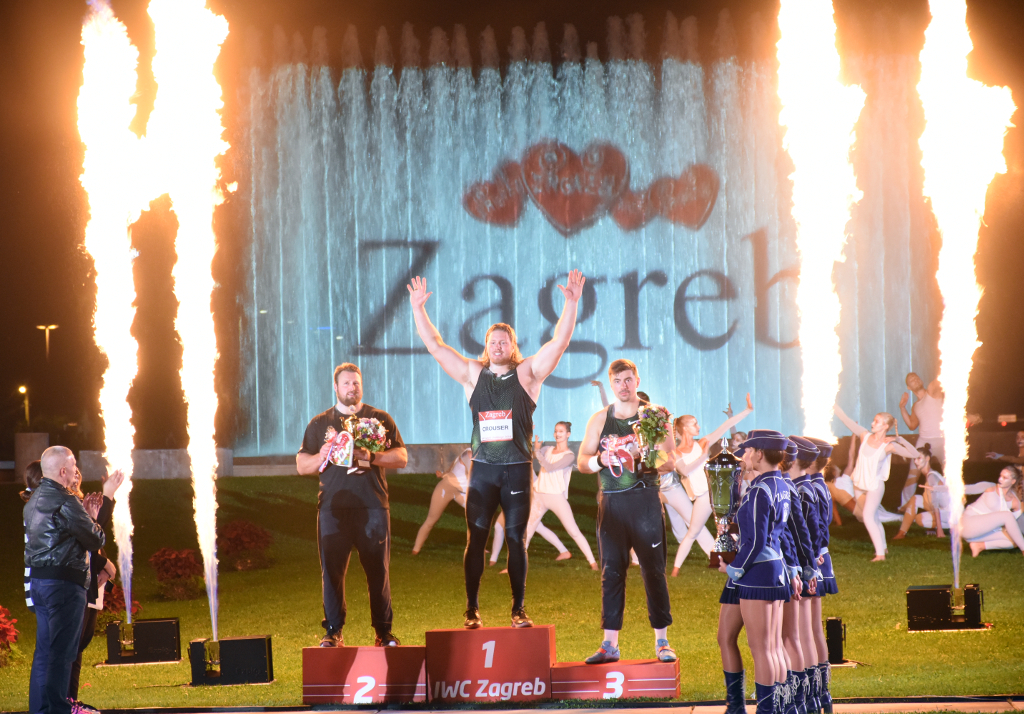
Crouser on the podium after winning the Zagreb Diamond League meeting in 2018

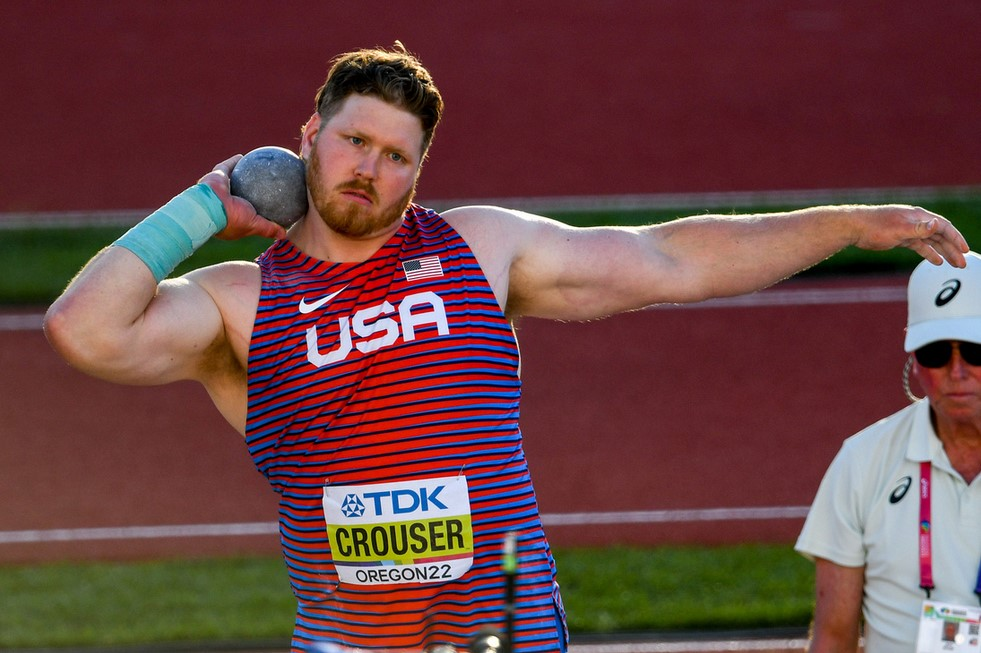
Crouser prepares to throw the shot put at 2022 World Championships in Eugene

=== International championships ===
Achievements at international championships
Year	Competition	Event	Distance	Position
2009	World Youth Championships	Shot put	21.56 m (70 ft 8 3/4 in)	1st place, gold medalist(s)
2009	World Youth Championships	Discus	61.64 m (202 ft 2 3/4 in)	2nd place, silver medalist(s)
2016	Summer Olympics	Shot put	22.52 m (73 ft 10 1/2 in)	1st place, gold medalist(s)
2017	World Championships	Shot put	21.20 m (69 ft 6 1/2 in)	6th
2018	IAAF Continental Cup	Shot put	21.63 m (70 ft 11 1/2 in)	5th
2019	World Championships	Shot put	22.90 m (75 ft 1 1/2 in)	2nd place, silver medalist(s)
2021	Summer Olympics	Shot put	23.30 m (76 ft 5 1/4 in)	1st place, gold medalist(s)
2022	World Indoor Championships	Shot put	22.44 m (73 ft 7 1/4 in)	2nd place, silver medalist(s)
2022	World Championships	Shot put	22.94 m (75 ft 3 1/4 in)	1st place, gold medalist(s)
2023	World Championships	Shot put	23.51m (77 ft 1 1/2 in)	1st place, gold medalist(s)
2024	World Indoor Championships	Shot put	22.71m (74 ft 8 1/2in)	1st place, gold medalist(s)
2024	Summer Olympics	Shot put	22.90m (75 ft 1 1/2in)	1st place, gold medalist(s)
2025	World Championships	Shot put	22.34m (73 ft 3 1/2in)	1st place, gold medalist(s)

=== National championships ===
Achievements at national championships
Year	Competition	Event	Distance	Position
2008	USA Youth Outdoor Championships	Shot put	17.48 m (57 ft 4 in)	1st place, gold medalist(s)
2008	USA Youth Outdoor Championships	Discus	54.94 m (180 ft 2 3/4 in)	1st place, gold medalist(s)
2009	World Youth Trials	Shot put	21.55 m (70 ft 8 1/4 in)	1st place, gold medalist(s)
2009	World Youth Trials	Discus	63.33 m (207 ft 9 1/4 in)	1st place, gold medalist(s)
2016	United States Olympic Trials	Shot put	22.11 m (72 ft 6 1/4 in)	1st place, gold medalist(s)
2017	USA Outdoor Championships	Shot put	22.65 m (74 ft 3 1/2 in)	1st place, gold medalist(s)
2018	USA Outdoor Championships	Shot put	20.99 m (68 ft 10 1/4 in)	2nd place, silver medalist(s)
2019	USA Outdoor Championships	Shot put	22.62 m (74 ft 2^{1}/_{2} in)	1st place, gold medalist(s)
2019	USA Indoor Championships	Shot put	22.22 m (72 ft 10^{3}/_{4} in)	1st place, gold medalist(s)
2020	USA Indoor Championships	Shot put	22.60 m (74 ft 1^{3}/_{4} in)	1st place, gold medalist(s)
2021	USA Outdoor Championships	Shot put	23.37 m (76 ft 8^{1}/_{4} in)	1st place, gold medalist(s)
2021	United States Olympic Trials	Shot put	23.37 m (76 ft 8^{1}/_{4} in)	1st place, gold medalist(s)
2022	USA Outdoor Championships	Shot put	23.12 m (75 ft 10 in)	1st place, gold medalist(s)
2022	USA Indoor Championships	Shot put	22.75 m (74 ft 7^{2}/_{3} in)	1st place, gold medalist(s)
2023	USA Outdoor Championships	Shot put	22.86 m (75 ft 0 in)	1st place, gold medalist(s)
2024	USA Indoor Championships	Shot put	22.80 m (74 ft 9^{3}/_{4} in)	1st place, gold medalist(s)
2024	USA Outdoor Championships	Shot put	22.84 m (74 ft 11^{2}/_{9} in)	1st place, gold medalist(s)

=== NCAA championships ===
Achievements at NCAA championships
Year	Competition	Event	Distance	Position
2012	NCAA Division I Indoor Championships	Shot put	19.94 m (65 ft 5 in)	5th
2012	Big 12 Conference Indoor Championships	Shot put	19.90 m (65 ft 3 1/4 in)	1st place, gold medalist(s)
2012	Big 12 Conference Outdoor Championships	Shot put	17.78 m (58 ft 4 in)	7th
2012	Big 12 Conference Outdoor Championships	Discus	56.01 m (183 ft 9 in)	5th
2012	NCAA Division I Outdoor Championships	Shot put	18.50 m (60 ft 8 1/4 in)	16th
2012	NCAA Division I Outdoor Championships	Discus	59.77 m (196 ft 1 in)	4th
2013	Big 12 Conference Outdoor Championships	Shot put	21.09 m (69 ft 2 1/4 in)	1st place, gold medalist(s)
2013	Big 12 Conference Outdoor Championships	Discus	55.42 m (181 ft 9 3/4 in)	3rd place, bronze medalist(s)
2013	NCAA Division I Outdoor Championships	Shot put	20.31 m (66 ft 7 1/2 in)	1st place, gold medalist(s)
2013	NCAA Division I Outdoor Championships	Discus	59.21 m (194 ft 3 in)	8th
2014	Big 12 Conference Indoor Championships	Shot put	20.63 m (67 ft 8 in)	1st place, gold medalist(s)
2014	NCAA Division I Indoor Championships	Shot put	21.21 m (69 ft 7 in)	1st place, gold medalist(s)
2014	Big 12 Conference Indoor Championships	Shot put	21.39 m (70 ft 2 in)	1st place, gold medalist(s)
2014	Big 12 Conference Indoor Championships	Discus	63.90 m (209 ft 7 1/2 in)	1st place, gold medalist(s)
2014	NCAA Division I Outdoor Championships	Shot put	21.12 m (69 ft 3 1/4 in)	1st place, gold medalist(s)
2015	Big 12 Conference Indoor Championships	Shot put	21.14 m (69 ft 4 1/4 in)	1st place, gold medalist(s)
2015	NCAA Division I Indoor Championships	Shot put	20.93 m (68 ft 8 in)	2nd place, silver medalist(s)
2015	Big 12 Conference Outdoor Championships	Shot put	20.52 m (67 ft 3 3/4 in)	1st place, gold medalist(s)
2015	Big 12 Conference Outdoor Championships	Discus	58.92 m (193 ft 3 1/2 in)	1st place, gold medalist(s)
2015	NCAA Division I Outdoor Championships	Shot put	19.99 m (65 ft 7 in)	5th
2015	NCAA Division I Outdoor Championships	Discus	60.18 m (197 ft 5 1/4 in)	5th
2016	Big 12 Conference Indoor Championships	Shot put	21.73 m (71 ft 3 1/2 in)	1st place, gold medalist(s)
2016	NCAA Division I Indoor Championships	Shot put	21.28 m (69 ft 9 3/4 in)	1st place, gold medalist(s)

=== World Athletics Rankings ===
Crouser's highest world rankings and season bests, per year
Year	World Ranking	Season Best (meters)
2016	1	22.52
2017	1	22.65
2018	2	22.53
2019	2	22.90
2020	1	22.91
2021	1	**23.37**
2022	2	23.12
2023	1	**23.56**
2024	1	22.93

Key: World record (in bold)

== Awards ==
- Night of Legends Award 2021: Jesse Owens Male Athlete of the Year

Records
Preceded by (United States) Randy Barnes	Men's shot put indoor world record holder January 24, 2021 – present	Incumbent
Preceded by (United States) Randy Barnes	Men's shot put world record holder June 18, 2021 – present	Incumbent
Awards
Preceded by Sam Crouser	Track & Field News High School Boys Athlete of the Year; 2011	Succeeded by Tyreek Hill
