= Clayton Vaughn =

American track and field sprinter (born 1992)

Personal information
- Born: May 15, 1992 (age 34) Sulphur Springs, Texas
- Height: 5 ft 8 in (173 cm)
- Weight: 163 lb (74 kg)

Sport
- Sport: Track and field
- Event: Sprints
- College team: Texas–Arlington Mavericks

Achievements and titles
- Personal best: 100-meter dash – 9.93

Clayton Vaughn (born May 15, 1992) is an American track and field sprinter who competes in the 100-meter dash and 200-meter dash. He has a sub-10-second best in the 100 m with 9.93 seconds. He placed third in the 60-meter dash at the 2015 USA Indoor Track and Field Championships.

Vaughn competed for the Texas–Arlington Mavericks and won eight sprint titles from 60 m to 200 m and the 4×100-meter relay in regional conference championships. He is the school record holder in the 100 m and relay events.

== Career ==
=== Early life ===
Born in Sulphur Springs, Texas to Chris Vaughn and Melanie Pride, his family had sporting roots, as his father played college football for the University of Tulsa. He attended Judson High School before going on to study business and kinesiology at the University of Texas at Arlington. He began to compete in track for the Texas–Arlington Mavericks team. He had previously shown his ability in the sport, but hamstring injuries kept him from reaching a high standard at high school.

=== College ===
In his first year of competition for the Texas–Arlington Mavericks he set personal records across the board, including 6.76 seconds for the indoor 60-meter dash, 10.36 for the 100 m, and 21.31 for the 200 m. At that year's Southland Conference championships he was third in the 60 m and fourth in the 100 m. He also represented his team at the NCAA Men's Outdoor Track and Field Championships.

At the start of 2012, Vaughn was much improve in the indoor 60 m event and, after winning the Southland Conference title in the distance, he placed fifth at the NCAA Men's Indoor Track and Field Championships with a new best of 6.61 seconds. Outdoors he suffered an injury at the Texas Relays and missed most of the rest of the season. He returned indoors in 2013, winning a 60 m/200 m double at the Western Athletic Conference championships, including an absolute personal record in the 200 m with 20.86 seconds. He also ran in the 60 m heats of the NCAA Indoor Championships, placing ninth overall. His outdoor season was immediately curtailed after he suffered another injury – a stress fracture in his right fibula. His mother unexpectedly died at the end of that year from an E. coli infection. He vowed to live up to her expectations and his coach, Tyrone Edgar (a former British international sprinter), urged him to honour her with his running.

Entering his fourth year at Texas–Arlington, he set a new 60 m best of 6.55 seconds in February 2014. This was a school record and ranked him in the top-25 for the event globally that year. He won over the distance at the Sun Belt Conference championships three weeks later, but missed NCAA competition, again due to an injury. He returned to form outdoors with runner-up finishes in both the 100 m and 200 m at the Sun Belt Conference meet and was a finalist in those events at the 2014 NCAA Division I Outdoor Track and Field Championships. His placing in the relay brought him three All-American honours – a first for a Mavericks athlete. He broke the school record in the 100 m with 10.07 seconds and also set the record in the 4×100-meter relay (39.55 seconds). A new 200 m personal record of 20.47 seconds brought him to fourth on the school's all-time lists.

Vaughn set a season-leading time of 6.54 seconds for the 60 m at the Leonard Hilton Memorial in January 2015. He beat global sprint medallists Trell Kimmons and Mike Rodgers, then had his first national podium finish at the 2015 USA Indoor Track and Field Championships, taking third behind Marvin Bracy and Joseph Morris. His time ranked him 14th in the world rankings for the distance that year. The 100 m final of the Sunbelt Conference Outdoor Championships was held on Mother's Day and he won the race in a big personal best of 9.93 seconds, becoming the 95th man to break the 10-second barrier. Vaughn dedicated the performance to his mother, saying "my mom always believed that I could run fast...But I never really saw it. I did it on a day where I could honor her". The time made him the fourth fastest American college athlete ever, after Ngoni Makusha, Davidson Ezinwa and Ato Boldon – who all later won World Championships medals. Vaughn was also third in the 200 m and a relay winner at the Sunbelt Conference meet. He again reached the final in the 100 m at the 2015 NCAA Outdoor Championships, but was somewhat off his best in eighth place.

=== Professional ===
Following his graduation, he began competing professionally. He entered the 2015 USA Outdoor Track and Field Championships, but was eliminated in the 100 m heats as the fastest non-qualifier, one hundredth of a seconds behind Trell Kimmons.

== Personal records ==
- 100-meter dash – 9.93 (2015)
- 200-meter dash – 20.66 (2014)
- 60-meter dash indoor – 6.54 (2015)
- 200-meter dash indoor – 20.86 (2013)
