= 2013 USA Indoor Track and Field Championships =

- Dates: March 1–3
- Host city: Albuquerque, New Mexico, United States
- Venue: Albuquerque Convention Center
- Level: Senior
- Type: Indoor
- Events: 26 (men: 13; women: 13)

The 2013 USA Indoor Track and Field Championships was held at Albuquerque Convention Center in Albuquerque, New Mexico. Organised by USA Track and Field (USATF), the three-day competition took place March 1–3 in conjunction with the USA Indoor Combined Events Championships which started the day after and served as the national championships in track and field for the United States.

== Medal summary ==
=== Men ===
Event	Gold		Silver		Bronze	
60 meters	D'Angelo Cherry	6.49	Reggie Dixon	6.54	Jeremy Dodson	6.58
400 meters	Jeremy Wariner	45.82	Marcus Boyd	46.54	Michael Courtney	48.00
800 meters	Erik Sowinski	1:47.09	Robby Andrews	1:47.13	Tyler Mulder	1:47.43
1 Mile	Will Leer	3:58.79	Craig Miller	3:58.90	Cory Leslie	3:59.88
3000 meters	Will Leer	8:07.84	Benjamin Bruce	8:16.69	Tommy Schmitz	8:30.92
60 meters hurdles	Omoghan Osaghae	7.62	Brendan Ames	7.72	Trey Hardee	7.74
3000 meters racewalk	Tim Seaman	12:08.65	Patrick Stroupe	12:30.15	Dan Serianni	13:03.40
High jump	Dusty Jonas	2.25 m (7 ft 4 1/2 in)	Keith Moffatt	2.22 m (7 ft 3 1/4 in)	Justin Frick	2.19 m (7 ft 2 in)
Pole vault	Jordan Scott	5.60 m (18 ft 4 1/4 in)	Jake Winder	5.55 m (18 ft 2 1/2 in)	Jeffrey Coover	5.55 m (18 ft 2 1/2 in)
Long jump	Jeremy Hicks	7.99 m (26 ft 2 1/2 in)	Michael Hartfield	7.85 m (25 ft 9 in)	Mikese Morse	7.66 m (25 ft 1 1/2 in)
Triple jump	Joshua Honeycutt	16.59 m (54 ft 5 in)	Rafeeq Curry	16.45 m (53 ft 11 1/2 in)	James Jenkins	16.35 m (53 ft 7 1/2 in)
Shot put	Ryan Whiting	21.80 m (71 ft 6 1/4 in)	Cory Martin	20.93 m (68 ft 8 in)	Kurt Roberts	20.89 m (68 ft 6 1/4 in)
Weight throw	Jake Freeman	23.51 m (77 ft 1 1/2 in)	A. G. Kruger	23.37 m (76 ft 8 in)	Colin Dunbar	22.20 m (72 ft 10 in)
Heptathlon	Gunnar Nixon	6232 pts	Curtis Beach	5895 pts	Ryan Harlan	5778 pts
Masters 400 meters	Eric Prince	51.59	Jason Rhodes	52.01	Marcus Santi	52.77

=== Women ===
Event	Gold		Silver		Bronze	
60 meters	Barbara Pierre	7.08	LaKeisha Lawson	7.10	Shayla Mahan	7.19
400 meters	Ebonie Floyd	52.02	Joanna Atkins	53.33	LaSasha Aldredge	54.53
800 meters	Ajeé Wilson	2:02.64	Chanelle Price	2:02.93	Bethany Praska	2:03.57
1 Mile run	Mary Cain	5:05.68	Treniere Moser	5:06.55	Brie Felnagle	5:06.90
3000 meters	Chelsea Reilly	9:23.12	Emily Infeld	9:23.24	Lisa Uhl	9:23.37
60 meters hurdles	Nia Ali	7.93	Kristi Castlin	7.97	Janay DeLoach Soukup	8.00
3000 meters race walk	Maria Michta	13:07.07	Erin Gray	13:17.90	Miranda Melville	13:24.96
High jump	Inika McPherson	1.89 m (6 ft 2 1/4 in)	Sharon Day	1.83 m (6 ft 0 in)	Linda Rainwater	1.80 m (5 ft 10 3/4 in)
Pole vault	Jenn Suhr	5.02 m (16 ft 5 1/2 in) WR	Kylie Hutson	4.75 m (15 ft 7 in)	Mary Saxer	4.60 m (15 ft 1 in)
Long jump	Janay DeLoach Soukup	6.80 m (22 ft 3 1/2 in)	Whitney Gipson	6.65 m (21 ft 9 3/4 in)	Alesha Walker	6.57 m (21 ft 6 1/2 in)
Triple jump	Amanda Smock	13.65 m (44 ft 9 1/4 in)	Blessing Ufodiama	13.44 m (44 ft 1 in)	Toni Smith	13.39 m (43 ft 11 in)
Shot put	Michelle Carter	19.41 m (63 ft 8 in)	Jeneva McCall	17.97 m (58 ft 11 1/4 in)	Christina Hillman	17.62 m (57 ft 9 1/2 in)
Weight throw	Gwen Berry	24.70 m (81 ft 1/4 in)	Amber Campbell	23.68 m (77 ft 8 1/4 in)	Jeneva McCall	22.62 m (74 ft 2 1/2 in)
Pentathlon	Sharon Day	4478 pts	Bettie Wade	4333 pts	Lindsay Lettow	4301 pts
Masters 3000 meters	Lisa Valle	11:07.76	Jill Vollweiler	11:30.94	Christine Garves	11:31.64
