= Springwater Trail High School =

Location
- 1440 SE Fleming Avenue; Gresham, Multnomah County, Oregon 97080; United States
- 45.484426°N 122.407466°W

Information
- Type: Public
- Opened: 2002
- School district: Gresham-Barlow School District
- Principal: Ryan Blaszak
- Teaching staff: 8.89 (FTE)
- Grades: 9-12
- Enrollment: 193 (2018–19)
- Student to teacher ratio: 21.71
- Mascot: Titan
- Website: https://sths.gresham.k12.or.us

Springwater Trail High School is a public high school in the Gresham-Barlow School District located in Gresham, Oregon, United States. It is described as a "small, personal (intimate) campus-like setting." Juniors and Seniors have an opportunity to participate in a middle college program at Mt. Hood Community College.

== About ==
Springwater Trail High School serves approximately 200 students from 9th through 12th grade, making it much smaller than typical public high schools in the Portland metro area. It accepts students by application from anywhere in the Gresham-Barlow School District. The program includes a four-year high school experience that culminates in a standard high school diploma.

The school's mascot is the Titan and the school colors are black and silver.

== History ==
The school opened for students in September 2002 as the third high school in the Gresham-Barlow School District. The first graduating class was the class of 2003.

== 2007 shooting ==
On April 11, 2007, Chad Escobedo, who was a current student at the school at the time, fired two shots at the school. 10 people were injured by the gunfire and broken glass. Escobedo was sentenced to six years in prison for the shooting.

== See also ==
- Springwater Corridor
