= Blessing Ufodiama =

American triple jumper

Personal information
- Nationality: American, Nigerian
- Born: November 28, 1981 (age 44) Nigeria
- Home town: Long Beach, California
- Height: 5 ft 10 in (1.78 m)
- Weight: 134 lb (61 kg)

Sport
- Sport: Athletics
- Event: Triple jump
- College team: Washington State Cougars

Achievements and titles
- Personal best: TJ: 14.06 m (2011)

Blessing Ufodiama (born 28 November 1981) is an American former triple jumper. She is a three-time United States Olympic trials qualifier, with a best national finish of 2nd at the 2013 USA Indoor Track and Field Championships.

== Biography ==
Ufodiama attended Long Beach Polytechnic High School, where she won the national indoor HS triple jump championship. She competed collegiately for the Washington State Cougars track and field team.

After graduating Washington State in 2004, Ufodiama took a 3-year break from competing but returned after the birth of her son Emmanuel in 2007 to compete professionally. She went on to register top-10 finishes at the USA Outdoor Track and Field Championships or USA Indoor Track and Field Championships for seven consecutive years, with a best finish of 2nd at the 2013 indoor championships.

Ufodiama qualified for the 2008, 2012, and 2016 United States Olympic trials, but did not jump far enough to make an Olympic team.

Ufodiama jumped her personal best of 14.06 metres at the 2011 Prefontaine Classic, scoring two points in the 2011 Diamond League season.

In 2016, Ufodiama joined the track and field coaching staff at Mira Costa High School.

== Statistics ==
=== Personal bests ===
| Event | Mark | Competition | Venue | Date |
|---|---|---|---|---|
| Triple jump | 14.06 m (+1.0 m/s) | Prefontaine Classic | Eugene, Oregon | 4 June 2011 |
| Long jump | 5.96 m (+1.0 m/s) | UC Irvine Spring Break Invite | Irvine, California | 19 March 2011 |
