= Sam Barlow High School =

Public school in Gresham, Oregon, United States

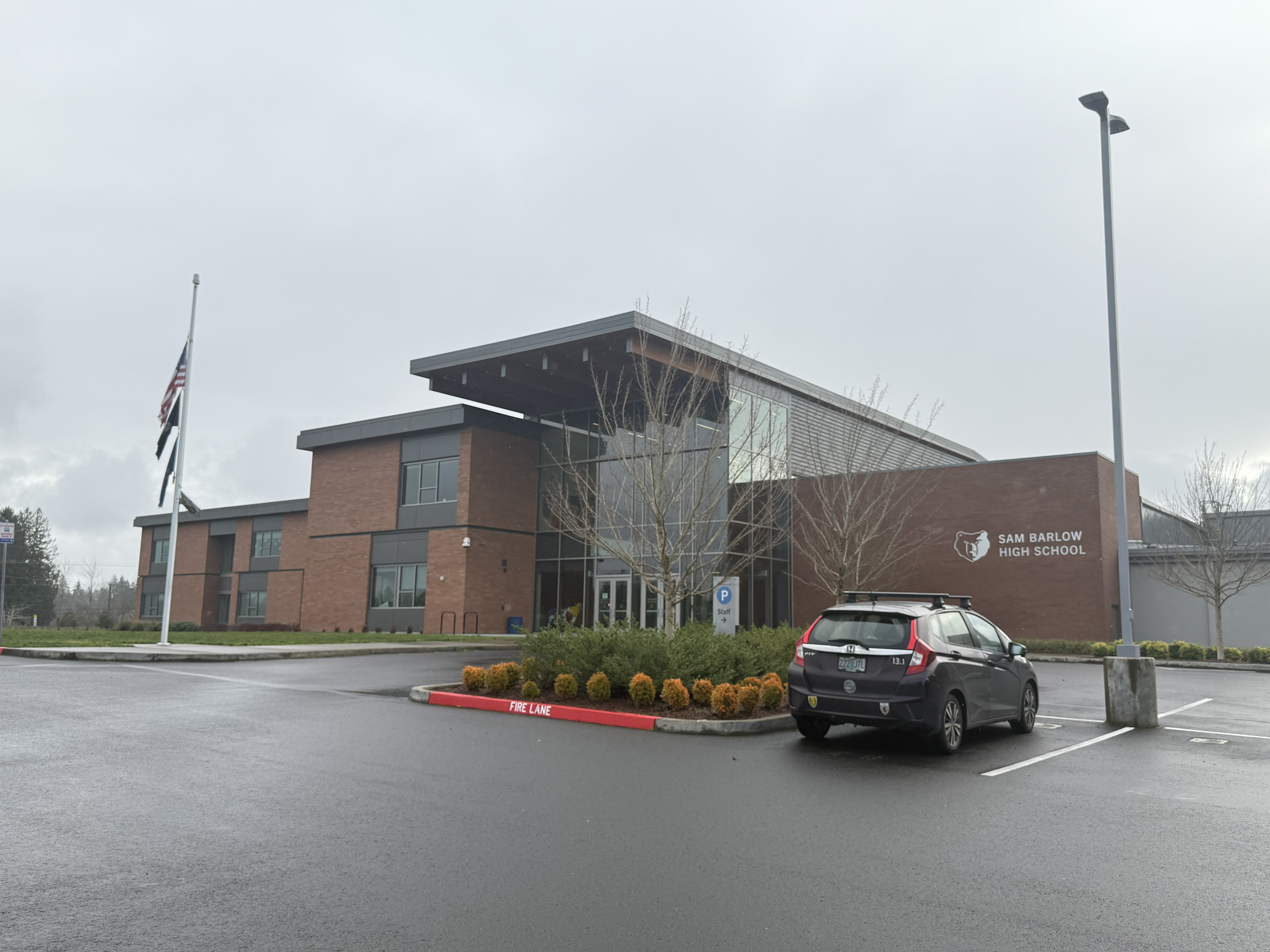

Location
- 5105 SE 302nd Avenue; Gresham, (Multnomah County), Oregon 97080; United States; 45.485536°N 122.353025°W

Information
- Type: Public
- Opened: 1968
- School district: Gresham-Barlow School District
- Principal: Jason Bhear
- Teaching staff: 64.17 (FTE)
- Grades: 9–12
- Enrollment: 1,638 (2023-2024)
- Student to teacher ratio: 25.53
- Colors: Blue and gold
- Athletics conference: OSAA Mt. Hood Conference 6A-4
- Mascot: Bruin
- Team name: Barlow Bruins
- Rival: Gresham High School
- Newspaper: Bruin Banner
- Feeder schools: Deep Creek Damascus K-8 School; Gordon Russell Middle School; West Orient Middle School
- Website: sbhs.gresham.k12.or.us

Sam Barlow High School (SBHS, colloquially Barlow) is a public high school in Gresham, Oregon, United States. Barlow is one of two main high schools in the Gresham-Barlow School District, with its rival Gresham High School as the other school. Opened in 1968, it was named after the Oregon pioneer Sam Barlow who is the namesake for the Barlow Road along the Oregon Trail. The school has an enrollment of around 1,600, and are nicknamed the Bruins.

== History ==
Sam Barlow High School opened in September 1968 in its present location at 302nd Street and Lusted Road, east of Gresham, Oregon.

Teacher Stephen Corkett received the University of Oregon's high school teacher of the year award in 2009.

On November 23, 2009, two students discussed plans for a school shooting at Barlow High on Myspace. They were found guilty of disorderly conduct in February 2010.

On October 5, 2017, around 11AM, a 911 call was reported about a potential shooting as they saw a student with a handgun. The school was under lockdown for 2 hours before being lifted at around 1PM. The incident has since been ruled a hoax.

== Academics ==
In 2008, 75% of the school's seniors received a high school diploma. Of 419 students, 315 graduated, 74 dropped out, ten received a modified diploma, and 20 were still in high school the following year.

In 2013, 85% of the school's seniors received a high school diploma. Of 400 students, 340 graduated, 40 dropped out, six received a modified diploma, and 13 were still in high school the following year.

Barlow's students have been filling AP classes and passing AP exams at such a high rate that the College Board named the Gresham-Barlow School District to its fourth-annual Advanced Placement District Honor Roll. Just three districts in Oregon received the honor.

== Sports ==
=== State championships ===
- Girls' volleyball: 1987, 1992, 1993, 1995, 1996
- Boys' track and field: 1999, 2008
- Boys' wrestling: 1980, 1981
- Girls' track and field: 1982, 2015
- Girls' water polo: 2018, 2021
- Boys water polo: 2023
- Boys basketball: 2025

== Activities ==
=== State championships ===
- Band: 1994, 1995
- Speech: 1988, 1998, 2002, 2008, 2011
- Theatre: 2015, 2016, 2018, 2019, 2021, 2022, 2023, 2024, 2025

=== National championships ===
- Girls' Racquetball: 2020
- Theatre: 2016

== Notable alumni ==
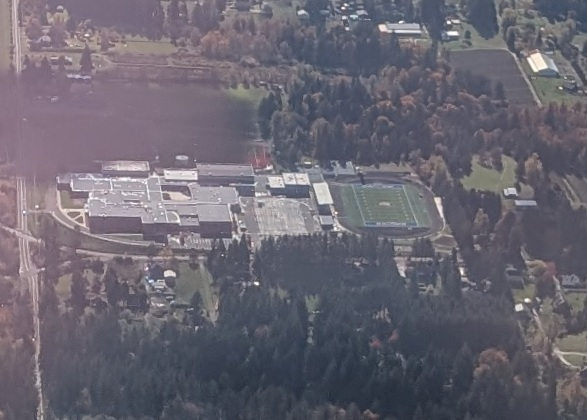
Aerial view in 2025

- Brian Burres – Major League Baseball pitcher, Pittsburgh Pirates
- Ryan Crouser – athlete, gold medalist in shot put at the 2016, 2020 and 2024 Summer Olympics
- Mike Ekstrom – Major League Baseball pitcher, Tampa Bay Rays
- Dave Jansen – mixed martial arts fighter, Bellator
- Fred Jones – former National Basketball Association shooting guard
- Brent Knopf – singer, songwriter and musician in indie bands Menomena, Ramona Falls and EL VY
- Mike Pierce – professional mixed martial arts fighter, formerly competing in the UFC
- Oscar Wood – wrestler
- Doc Haskell - Head esports coach at Boise State University
