= Martin Ellis (organist) =

American organist

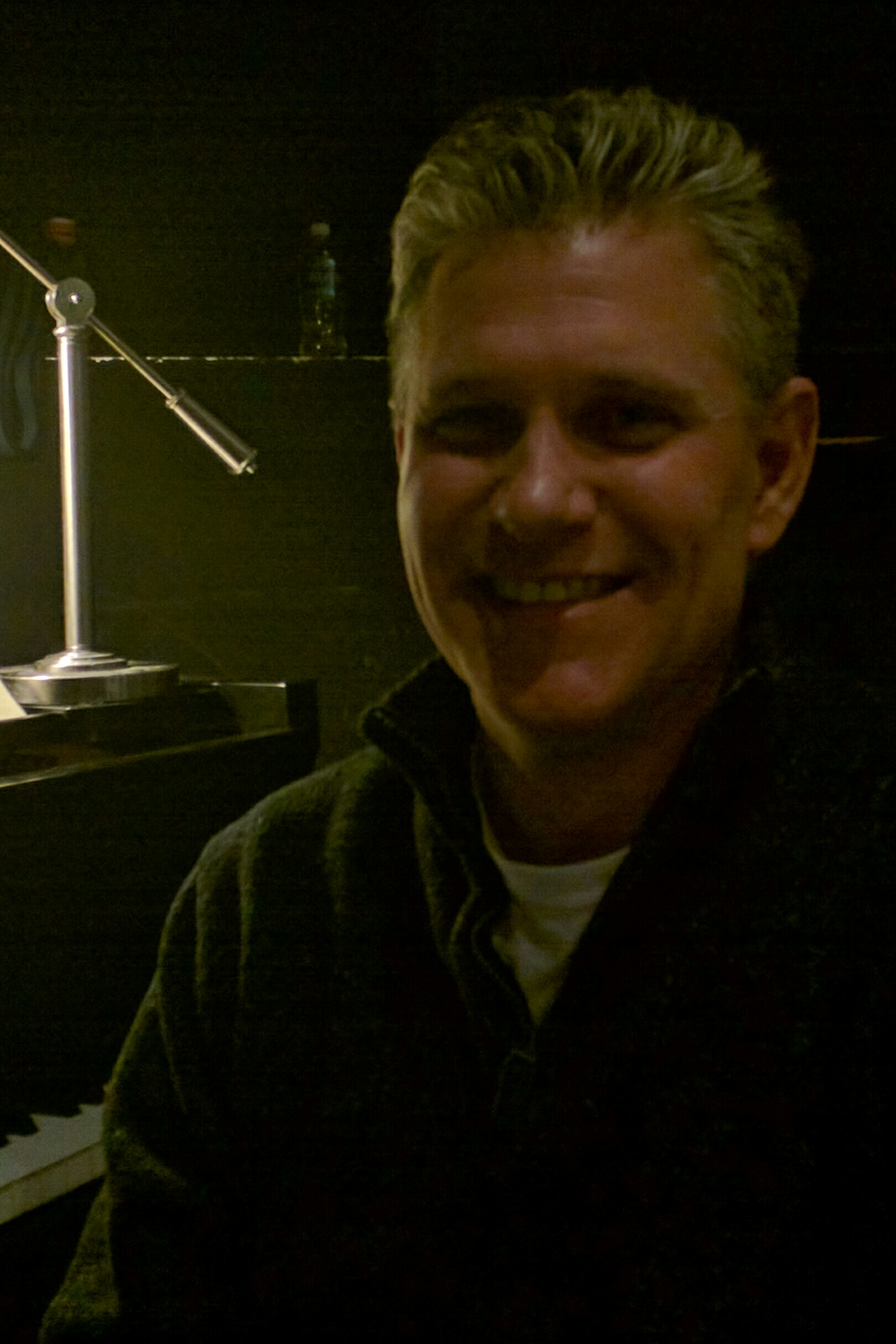
Martin Ellis after a rehearsal with Gresham High School's Theatre Arts Department

Martin Ellis is an American church, concert and theatre organist. He is currently the organist for Rose City Park Presbyterian Church in Portland, Oregon. He was principal organist and assistant music director at North United Methodist Church, and senior staff pianist and organist, staff arranger and orchestrator for the Indianapolis Children's Choir and Youth Chorale in Indianapolis, Indiana until August, 2014. He works with Gresham High School's Theatre Arts Department as their resident piano accompanist.

== Training and early career ==
Ellis began organ studies in the 6th grade, and at 15 began studying with R. Gary Deavel at Manchester University in North Manchester, Indiana.

At DePauw University in Greencastle, Indiana, Ellis majored in keyboard performance and composition. The Central Indiana Chapter of the American Theatre Organ Society (ATOS) was extremely supportive, engaging Martin in performances regionally throughout his college years. Ellis was also head accompanist for the DePauw Choirs, touring to Carnegie Hall and Williamsburg, Virginia. He was active as a vocal coach to the voice department and assistant conductor for three opera/musical theatre productions produced by the DePauw School of Music. He graduated from Depauw in 1990.

== Church Organist/Music Director ==
Before accepting the position playing for Rose City Park Presbyterian in 2014, Martin was assistant organist and choirmaster at second Presbyterian Church (Indiana's largest church) under Robert Shepfer, playing the 4m/81r Aeolian-Skinner pipe organ from 1990 to 1998. He then moved to Portland, Oregon, serving as music director and organist at St. James Lutheran Church in downtown Portland. In 2004, Martin was appointed the assistant director of music and organist at North United Methodist Church in Indianapolis, playing the restored 4m/76r Kimball orchestral pipe organ and two other organs. He also directed the Cathedral Ringers Handbell Ensemble and coordinated the handbell program.

== Theatre organist ==
Ellis' initial exposure to the theatre organ occurred at the Paramount Music Palace in Indianapolis when he was 7 years old. During his senior year, he served as the weekend artist at Milwaukee's Piper Music Palace, as an alternate organist at the Pipes and Pizza in Lansing, Illinois, and performed concerts in and around the Chicago area. Ellis is now an active featured theatre organist for ATOS and has been a regular theatre organ soloist in both the Chicago and Indianapolis areas for the last twenty years. After his move to Portland, Theatre organ came into play again as he served as an associate organist at Uncle Milt's Pipe Organ Pizza in Vancouver, Washington and played for the local organ clubs. He has appeared on the Ohio Theatre's summer movie series for several years. Mr. Ellis has been a featured artist at conventions of The American Guild of Organists, The Organ Historical Society, and The American Theatre Organ Society.

== Concert organist ==
Ellis has appeared with the Indianapolis Chamber Orchestra, Indianapolis Symphony Orchestra, playing Saint-Saëns Symphony No. 3 and featured in recent Yuletide Celebrations, and also played the Poulenc Organ Concerto for the Carmel Symphony Orchestra.

== Hilbert Circle Theatre ==
Ellis was named the house organist for Hilbert Circle Theatre in Indianapolis, Indiana in 2009. "The 15 rank Wurlitzer with 9 additional classical ranks has truly turned out to be a stunning theatre installation that I am enjoying playing and proud to present to the public", commented Ellis.

This historic theatre has not had a house organist since the first Wurlitzer was removed in the 1930s; Ellis is the first house organist in over seventy years. Carlton Smith of Carlton Smith Pipe Organ Restorations was responsible for the rebuild and reinstallation of the theatre's Wurlitzer.

"My biggest goal in this business of being a theatre organ artist is to reach out to the general public and perpetuate the theatre organ art form", said Martin. "With the 28 Yuletide Christmas shows coming up in December which will feature the Wurlitzer theatre pipe organ this year, this becomes a reality."

== Yuletide ==
"A vintage theatre pipe organ is giving the Indianapolis Symphony Orchestra some new sounds", heralded the Indianapolis Star newspaper." The addition of the organ increases the symphony's repertoire", said Simon Crookall, President and CEO of the ISO. Those were just a few of the comments about the Yuletide Celebration concerts—27 in all, which saw the debut of the newly installed 3m/24r Wuritzer theatre pipe organ by house organist, Martin Ellis, and colleague, Donna Parker.

Opening the second half of the concert, the house lights dimmed as the Wurlitzer and organist were introduced to the audience while the symphony played the beginning strains of the well-loved holiday hit "Silver Bells". With the organ console center stage surrounded by the symphony, the curtain rose, the organist quickly took his place on the bench, and both organ and orchestra joined for "Joy to the World", played in classic toccata fashion, before taking the instrument in a completely different direction with a rhythmic, energetic Brazilian "Sleigh Bells". The organ arrangement was written by Ellis, with the orchestral arrangement by conductor Jack Everly, carefully fitted around it.

The Yuletide Celebration concert series is the second largest Christmas concert series in the United States—second only in ticket sales to the Christmas show at Radio City Music Hall with The Rockettes.

== Pacific Rim Children's Choir Festival ==
For seven years, Martin has also served as Artistic Assistant/Pianist for the Pacific Rim Children's Choir Festival in Honolulu, Hawaii.

== International performances and 2010 tour ==
Ellis has performed at Westminster Abbey in London and toured much of Canada and Europe, including playing an organ concert on the Tambourini organ at St. Peter's Basilica in Rome during tours with the ICC. Most recently, Ellis toured Australia in November 2010, performing for the Organ Society of Western Australia on the Karrinyup Wurlitzer Organ in the Sterling Theatre Concert Season. Ellis was interviewed by John Crook of ATW Travel Radio Australia during his tour. Another highlight of the tour was the Pops on Pipes concert in Auckland, New Zealand.

== Trio con Brio ==
With extraordinary sight-reading skills and the ability to musically adapt to a variety of situations, Martin was invited to be the fourth member of Trio con Brio by Donna Parker, Jonas Nordwall and Tom Hazleton. TCB uses three separate organs played simultaneously for grand orchestral effects and interesting concert programs. He performed for the Dickinson Theatre Organ Society and Fort Wayne's Embassy Theatre when Hazleton was unable to perform, and was ready to step in and play any of the other member's parts as the understudy. He became the third permanent member upon Hazleton's passing. Ellis is featured on three CDs from the group.

== Review ==
In a 2007 issue of the Vox Humana newsletter, from the Incorporated Society of Organ Builders, Mark Dresden writes about a recent Trio con Brio concert: "The players are excellent musicians, well versed in their knowledge of the theater organ in general and of the Dickinson Kimball in particular. They are also well versed in the art of playing together with creative, original and exciting arrangements. It was also exciting to see and hear for the first time the two Dickinson consoles on stage. But there was more. Also on stage with the Dickinson consoles were two grand pianos and a third organ which was an Allen Organ. All in all, it was a visually exciting prelude to that which was about to follow. Whether playing together as the Trio or playing individually, their music was clean, crisp and imaginative. As a trio however, we were treated to sounds that were quite special. Six hands, thirty fingers and six feet can and did produce wonderful arrangements just not possible by a single organist."

== Recordings ==
Mr. Ellis has a solo CD, Martin on the Morton, featuring the Wheaton Fox Studio 4/26 Robert Morton Pipe Organ, and In the Key of Three, the Trio's most recent recording. Other TCB CDs with Ellis include Tales from the Chambers, and A Change of Seasons.. Ellis is featured on the Reynolds Associates Pipe Organ Builders, Inc. website, playing music on two different Reynolds organs.

A solo theatre organ CD was recorded in Spring 2011, and the next Trio Con Brio recording using the 5 manual 108 rank Midmer-Losh organ at the Adrian Phillips Music Studio in Phoenix, Arizona.

== Organ Innovation ==
Ellis, Parker and Nordwall worked for Rodgers Instrument Corporation, spearheading MIDI implementation with church music.

== Arranger ==
Ellis has many published choral and orchestra arrangements with Hal Leonard and Colla Voce publishing companies. He recently orchestrated 15 pieces that were performed and recorded with the Moscow Chamber Orchestra and ICC. Novello and Co. Ltd published Ellis' arrangement of three organ pieces by Samuel Wesley. In 2012, his arrangement of "The Star-Spangled Banner" was performed by Kelly Clarkson, the Indianapolis Children's Choir and percussion for Super Bowl XLVI at Lucas Oil Stadium in Indianapolis.

Ellis customized handbell music to benefit from the expanded octaves including chimes available at NUMC. Handbell ringers coined the term 'martinizing' to define Ellis' ability.

== Editor ==
Ellis selected and edited works for By Babylon's Streams, Organ Music of the English Romantic School. The book description from Boosey: "This music book presents some of the finest & most ambitious works written by English organ composers active between the late-Victorian period & the years following the First World War. Its contents include the Scherzoso of Walter Battison Haynes, the Nunc Dimittis of Charles Wood, the Fantasy on the Tune 'Babylon's Streams by William Harris, the Impromptu No. 2 by Sidney Nicholson, and the Lament."

== Teacher ==
Ellis taught privately in Indianapolis while working there. He was a featured instructor at the ATOS Summer Youth Camp in Eastern Massachusetts in June 2011, which provided young enthusiasts the opportunity to study and learn the art of the theatre pipe organ through lectures, master classes, and private instruction. Ellis currently works with Gresham High School (Oregon)'s Theatre Arts Department, accompanying their musical performances and student's competition pieces.

== Awards ==
After becoming the first winner of the ATOS Young Organists Competition in 1986, Ellis premiered with Rex Koury at the Chicago Theatre Wurlitzer and was featured in concert at the ATOS National Convention the following year in Richmond, Virginia. After winning the local American Guild of Organists competition, he was the runner-up in the AGO Region V competition. He also placed first in the Arts Council of Indianapolis' Young Artist Competition.

== Personal ==
Ellis has trained and cares for his six exotic parrots, and restores and collects large antique reed organs. He lives in Portland, Oregon.
