= Bobby Grace =

American attorney (born 1960)

Robert “Bobby” Grace (born September 29, 1960) is an American attorney. He is currently a Deputy District Attorney for the County of Los Angeles, working in the Major Crimes Unit. Grace has successfully prosecuted homicide cases, including those of Chester Turner and the Black Widow Killers.

== Community involvement ==
Bobby serves on the Board of Directors of the UCLA Black Alumni Association.
