= Brian Crouser =

American javelin thrower

Personal information
- Nationality: United States
- Born: August 9, 1962 (age 63) Portland, Oregon, U.S.

Sport
- Sport: Track and field
- Event: Javelin throw
- Updated on 5 May 2012

Brian David Crouser (born August 9, 1962) is a retired javelin thrower from the United States, who twice (1988 and 1992) competed at the Summer Olympics during his career.

== Biography ==
Brian Crouser was born to Larry and Marie Crouser, in early August 1962. At the age of nine, Brian witnessed a life-altering event. This event was the 1972 Summer Olympics in Munich, Germany. He immediately became interested in the throwing events, practicing the shot, discus, and javelin, in his backyard in a quiet, suburban, neighborhood in Gresham, Oregon. Brian attended Gresham High School, and participated in track and field. In 1981, while attending Gresham, Brian became the first boy to win the state championship in all three throwing events (Shot-put, Javelin, and Discus).

=== College ===
After graduating high school, Brian was quickly offered a full-ride scholarship by the University of Oregon in Eugene. He accepted, and began his college career in 1982. Crouser quickly made a name for himself at Oregon, when he became the first college freshman ever to win the NCAA javelin title, with a mark of 274'7". That throw earned Brian a top-three national ranking.

Battling injuries his sophomore and junior track seasons, Crouser was able to pull through, and win the Pac-10 javelin crown his junior year with a toss of 272'7". He was able to repeat this his senior year, where he once again won the Pac-10 javelin championship, with a throw of 283'8".

On May 5, 1985, Brian set an all-time collegiate record with a throw of 312'0".

=== A Setback ===
Crouser was diagnosed with cancer in the spring of 1986, which was in the middle of his senior year at Oregon. He began treatment and had surgery on April 18, within a week of the diagnosis. Crouser, during his stay at Bess Kaiser Hospital, with the eternal love of throwing, was often seen practicing his steps and crossovers in the halls. Brian's determination and perseverance was demonstrated when he was presented with a clean bill-of-health in late May, 1986.

The first year the new javelin implement was introduced, Crouser became the world-record holder, with a throw of 262'0".

=== Olympian Emerges ===
After graduating college in 1986, Crouser immediately set his sights on making the 1988 Olympic team. He continued training, and in the summer of 1988, he placed in the Olympic Trials in Indianapolis, Indiana. He went on to represent the United States, and place in the World's top thirty athletes at the 1988 Summer Olympics in Seoul.

Crouser trained for the next four years, and he made the 1992 U.S. Olympic team in Barcelona. He again placed in the world's top thirty athletes.

=== Personal life ===
Crouser currently resides in Redmond, Oregon. His nephew Ryan Crouser is a three time Olympic Gold medalist and is the current world record holder in the shot put.

== Achievements ==
Year	Competition	Venue	Position	Notes
1988	Olympic Games	Seoul, South Korea	29th	72.72 m
1992	Olympic Games	Barcelona, Spain	21st	74.98 m
