= Boston Athletic Association Indoor Games =

- Date: January or February
- Location: Boston, United States
- Event type: Indoor track and field
- Established: 1890
- Last held: 1971
- Organizer: Boston Athletic Association

The Boston Athletic Association Indoor Games was an indoor track meet organized by the Boston Athletic Association that was held annually in Boston from 1890 to 1971.

== History ==
=== Early years ===
The first Boston Athletic Association Indoor Games were held on February 15, 1890, at Mechanics Hall. 701 athletes entered the games, a number that "exceed[ed] that at any indoor meeting known in the history of amateur athletics", according to the New York Times. 4,000 spectators attended the games, which was described by the Times as a "society event". Harvard scored the most points of any team. Winners of the first B.A.A. games were:

Event	Name	Club
40-yard dash	A. H. Green	Harvard
880-yard run	F. R. Peters	Boston Athletic Association
220-yard run	T. J. McNeil	Trimount Athletic Club
Mile walk	J. B. Keating	Pastime Athletic Club
440-yard dash	K. Brown	Harvard
Mile run	G. Collamore	Harvard
220 yard hurdles	J. C. Lally	Pastime Athletic Club
High jump	G. R. Fearing Jr.	Harvard
Shot put (16 pounds)	J. S. Mitchel	New Jersey Athletic Club
Weight throw (56 pounds)	G. Coughlan	Tritan Athletic Club
Tug of war		Pastime Athletic Club

In 1891, the B.A.A. Games were moved to the South Armory. The event was attended by a capacity crowd, including Governor William E. Russell and his staff. Once again, Harvard won the most events, capturing the 75-yard dash (S. V. R. Thayer Jr.), 1000-yard run (Arthur Blake), mile run (H. C. Larkin), high jump (George R. Fearing Jr.), and quarter mile race (E. S. Mullin). Fearing set the men's high jump indoor world record with a mark of 1.89.

The event returned to Mechanics Hall in 1892, and Harvard once finished in first place, winning five of the twelve events. Edward Bloss, who competed for both Harvard and the B. A. A., set a world record in the 40 yard dash. Michael Sweeney broke the world record for the indoor running high jump at the 1894 games, which also saw Bernard Doherty break the world record in the standing broad jump.

The 1896 games saw two world-record holders compete. Thomas Conneff, who held the amateur record for the fastest mile, finished third in the mile handicap behind James N. Pringle of Dartmouth, who had a 70-yard start and Gerrish Newell of Harvard, who had a 60-yard start. Charles Kirkpatrick, who held the amateur record for the fastest mile, had his shorts come loose during a heat race and did not make it to the final race in the 600 yard run.

In 1900, Dr. B. J. Mulligan of the Knickerbocker Athletic Club broke the world record in the triple jump by two inches. In 1902, world champion sprinter Arthur Duffey was upset in the 40-yard dash by Harvard freshman Francis Scheuber.

In 1912, Samuel Lawrence broke Michael Sweeney's 18-year old high jump indoor world record. Those games also saw three track records broken (George Bonhag in the three mile run, Oscar Hedlund in the mile invitational, and John Paul Jones in the mile handicap).

In 1913, black sprinter Howard Drew announced he would not compete in the B. A. A. Games because the organization had drawn a color line. George B. Billings, chairman of the Boston Athletic Association's athletic committee, stated that no such line existed and there were "other reasons" why Drew was not permitted to enter. He cited John Taylor and A. M. Bowser as black athletes who had previously competed in the games.

At the 1915 games, the Boston Athletic Association team of Fred Burns, Stephen Rose, David Caldwell, and Thomas Halpin broke the world's record in the 4 × 1500 metres relay in a race against the New York Athletic Club.

=== Move to Boston Arena ===
In 1921, the Boston Athletic Association Indoor Games were moved from Mechanics Hall to the new Boston Arena. That year's event featured many athletes from the previous year's Olympics, including Richmond Landon, Earl Thomson, Jackson Scholz, John Murphy, Frank Loomis, Earl Eby, and Loren Murchison. Walter Camp refereed the schoolboy 50 yard sprint. The event's feature race was the Hunter Mile, which was won by the "Flying Parson" Harold Cutbill.

In 1926, Norwegian Charles Hoff set the men's pole vault indoor world record at 13 ft 1 1/4 in (3.994 m).

The 1929 B.A.A. Games saw the U.S. debut of Canadians Percy Williams and Jimmy Ball. Williams, who was competing in his first ever indoor event, won the 40-yard dash invitational.

The 1931 games were the first to have an event for women – an invitational 40-yard dash headlined by Stella Walsh. Walsh and Mary Carew won the semifinal heat races and in the finale, Walsh defeated Carew by a stride.

Two world records were broken during the 1932 B.A.A. Games. High jumper George Spitz set a world record with a mark of 6 feet 8 1/2 inches (2.045 m) and Leo Sexton broke the indoor shot put record at 51 feet 11 1/8 inches (15.827 m).

=== Move to Boston Garden ===
In 1933, the B.A.A. moved the games to the larger Boston Garden. According to Victor O. Jones of The Boston Globe, Boston Arena manager and B.A.A. member George V. Brown was reportedly happy with the move because the event did not bring much of a profit for the arena. 10,000 spectators attended that year's games, which saw Emmett Toppino win the 50-yard dash, Joe McCluskey win the two miles, Bernie McCafferty win the 600 yard run, George Spitz win the high jump, Keith Brown win the pole vault, and Carl Coan win the feature mile race.

The B.A.A. lost nearly 1,000 of its 1,600 members during the Great Depression. After filing for bankruptcy, the Association closed its clubhouse on August 4, 1935, and sold its building's furnishings at auction later that year. A group of former B.A.A. members formed the Unicorn Club to continue the indoor games and the Boston Marathon. On January 3, 1936, the Unicorn Club merged with the old B.A.A. and reorganized as a new Boston Athletic Association. George V. Burns, a member of the Association's Governing Board and the manager of the Boston Garden, allowed the indoor games to be held at the Garden free of charge.

The 1937 games saw three world records broken. George Varoff broke the men's pole vault indoor world record with mark of 14 ft 4 1/4 in (4.375 m), Sam Allen broke the record in the 45-yard high hurdles, and Don Lash broke the record for the two-mile indoor run. Cornelius Warmerdam broke Varoff's record at the 1939 meet with a mark of 14 ft 6 in (4.42 m). This record was broken again at the 1941 games, this time by Earle Meadows. At the following year's event, Warmerdam broke the record again with a 15 ft 7 in (4.75 m) vault.

Jim Fuchs broke the indoor shot put record at the 1950 B.A.A. Games, which also featured a big upset in the two miles when Curt Stone beat Fred Wilt.

In 1953, Mal Whitfield tied the indoor men's 600 yards world record with a time of 1:10.2.

In the feature race of the 1955 games, Wes Santee broke the world record in the indoor mile with a time of 4:03.8. The record was broken a week later by Gunnar Nielsen at the Wanamaker Mile.

In 1957, Tom Courtney tied the men's 600 yards world record with a time of 1:09.5. In 1959, Bill Dellinger set the two miles indoor record with a time of 8:49.9. The following year, John Thomas tied his world high jump record of 7 feet 1 1/2 inches (2.172 m).

In 1964, Wendell Mottley set the world indoor record in the 440-yard dash with a time of 48 seconds. In 1967, Willie Davenport tied the world record in the 45-yard hurdles. By this time, the B.A.A. games were the only meet to hold this event.

=== End ===
In 1970, the Knights of Columbus ended their annual Boston Garden track meet after 44 years due to financial issues. This left the B.A.A. Games as the last major track event in Boston, although, according to the New York Times they also appeared to "be in jeopardy".

The 1971 B.A.A. Games saw an attendance of 9,008, down from 13,645 in 1960. On November 5, 1971, B.A.A. president Will Cloney announced that the games would not take place in 1972 due to increased costs and low ticket sales.

== Hunter Mile ==
The Hunter Mile was the feature race of the Boston Athletic Association Indoor Games. It was named after BAA patron George L. Hunter and first contested at the 1911 games. Abel Kiviat was the inaugural winner.

Year	Athlete	Country	Time	Ref
1911	Abel Kiviat	United States	4:29.2	
1912	Frederick Hedlund	United States	4:23.8	
1913	Abel Kiviat	United States	4:26.4	
1914	Abel Kiviat	United States	4:28.0	
1915	Michael Devaney	United States	4:24.2	
1916	David Caldwell	United States	4:25.2	
1917	Michael Devaney	United States	4:25.2	
1918	Joie Ray	United States	4:24.6	
1919	Joie Ray	United States	4:22.2	
1920	Joie Ray	United States	4:23.2	
1921	Harold Cutbill	United States	4:22.6	
1922	Joie Ray	United States	4:20.4	
1923	Joie Ray	United States	4:19.0	
1924	Joie Ray	United States	4:18.0	
1925	Joie Ray	United States	4:15.2	
1926	James Connolly	United States	4:22.4	
1927	Lloyd Hahn	United States	4:20.4	
1928	Lloyd Hahn	United States	4:22.8	
1929	Ray Conger	United States	4:21.0	
1930	Ray Conger	United States	4:22.2	
1931	Leo Lermond	United States	4:19.2	
1932	Leo Lermond	United States	4:16.0	
1933	Carl Coan	United States	4:17.5	
1934	Glenn Cunningham	United States	4:18.4	
1935	Gene Venzke	United States	4:17.6	
1936	Gene Venzke	United States	4:14.4	
1937	Glenn Cunningham	United States	4:12.3	
1938	Glenn Cunningham	United States	4:10.0	
1939	Glenn Cunningham	United States	4:10.8	
1940	Charles Fenske	United States	4:11.2	
1941	Leslie MacMitchell	United States	4:10.7	
1942	Leslie MacMitchell	United States	4:11.8	
1943	Frank Dixon	United States	4:11.4	
1944	Gil Dodds	United States	4:09.5	
1945	James Rafferty	United States	4:14.3	
1946	Leslie MacMitchell	United States	4:13.6	
1947	Gil Dodds	United States	4:08.9	
1948	Gil Dodds	United States	4:08.1	
1949	Willem Slijkhuis	Netherlands	4:12.4	
1950	John Joe Barry	Ireland	4:13.4	
1951	Don Gehrmann	United States	4:07.9	
1952	Don Gehrmann	United States	4:08.9	
1953	Fred Dwyer	United States	4:09.2	
1954	Josy Barthel	Luxembourg	4:07.7	
1955	Wes Santee	United States	4:03.8	
1956	Ron Delany	Ireland	4:06.3	
1957	Ron Delany	Ireland	4:07.5	
1958	Ron Delany	Ireland	4:05.3	
1959	Ron Delany	Ireland	4:04.3	
1960	Phil Coleman	United States	4:03.8	
1961	István Rózsavölgyi	Hungary	4:06.8	
1962	John Reilly	United States	4:09.6	
1963	Vic Zwolak	United States	4:09.8	
1964	Bob Schul	United States	4:08.9	
1965	John Davies	New Zealand	4:04.0	
1966	Josef Odlozil	Czechoslovakia	4:05.2	
1967	Sam Bair	United States	4:04.8	
1968	Sam Bair	United States	4:01.9	
1969	Sam Bair	United States	4:04.3	
1970	Arthur Dulong	United States	4:01.1	
1971	Chuck LaBenz	United States	4:09.2	
