= Jack Ryder (track and field) =

American track and field coach

Biographical details
- Born: Boston, Massachusetts, U.S.
- Died: March 12, 1953 (aged 77); Boston, Massachusetts, U.S.

Coaching career (HC unless noted)

Track and field
- 1906–1911: South Boston Athletic Club
- 1911–1952: Boston Athletic Association
- 1919–1952: Boston College

John A. Ryder (died 1953) was an American track and field coach for the Boston Athletic Association and Boston College. He was also an assistant coach for the 1928 USA Olympic track and field team.

== Running ==
A native of Boston's Dorchester neighborhood, Ryder was the son of a lamplighter and first became interested in running when he filled in on his father's route.

Ryder began running in 1894 for the Dorchester Athletic Club. He won eight races in his first year and in 1895, now a member of the Suffolk Athletic Club, was a scratch runner in the mile. He did not run in 1896 due to an injured ankle. He was a successful half-mile runner in 1897, winning most of the races he entered. He turned professional in 1898 and won 52 of the 56 races he ran that year. The following year, he won 51 of 54 races. In 1900, he won 58 of 64 races. In 1903, he won every half-mile race in Boston. His final race came in 1904, when he broke a track record in a quarter mile race in Maspeth.

== Personal life ==
On December 28, 1903, Ryder married Bridget Sheerin. They had nine children. Their eldest son, John T. Ryder, was an associate graduate manager of athletics at Boston College and a copy editor the Boston Evening Traveller. Another son, Frank Ryder, was a road racer and Major League Baseball groundskeeper.

Outside of track, Ryder spent 17 years as an immigration inspector.

== Coaching ==
During his running career, Ryder coached a number of runners, including future Olympian Francis Sheehan. In 1906, Ryder's runners formed the nucleus of the South Boston Athletic Club.

Ryder left the SBAC in 1911 and began coaching the Boston Athletic Association later that year. Soon after taking over, the B.A.A relay team broke the Canadian mile relay record. At the 1912 Boston Athletic Association Indoor Games, his relay team tied the 1760-yard record and his mile runner, Frederick Hedlund set a new track record. Other runners Ryder coached at the BAA included David Caldwell, Thomas Halpin, Bill Meanix, Harold Cutbill, Lloyd Hahn, and Gil Dodds.

In 1919, Ryder became the track coach at Boston College. In his first season, BC were the Eastern Collegiate champions and won the Class C one mile at the Penn Relays. In 1921 and 1922, won the Class B mile at the Penn Relays and beat Georgetown, Fordham, and Notre Dame to win the Catholic College Championship. In 1923, BC's Jake Driscoll set the world record in the men's indoor 600 yards. Another Eagle, George Lermond, won the three-mile event at the Millrose Games as a junior and competed in the 1924 Summer Olympics. BC won the two-mile at the Penn Relays in 1924, 1927, and 1932. BC's two-mile relay team was undefeated in 1927. BC shot putter Dimitri Zaitz competed in the 1936 Summer Olympics. Herb McKenley was runner-up in the 440 yards at the 1944 NCAA track and field championships.

Ryder helped coach the United States track and field team at the 1928 Summer Olympics. In 1935, he was one of 14 college coaches that signed a letter calling for an American boycott of the 1936 Summer Olympics in Berlin.

Ryder also trained female athletes, including Esther Spargo and Virginia Lennon.

== Death ==
Ryder retired in 1952 due to poor health. He died on March 12, 1953, at his home in West Roxbury. He was 77 years old.
