= The Flying Parson =

The Flying Parson may refer to:

- Harold Cutbill, American track athlete and minister
- Gil Dodds, American middle-distance runner and minister
- Belvin Maynard, American pilot and divinity student
