= Paul Cummings =

American distance runner (1953–2001)

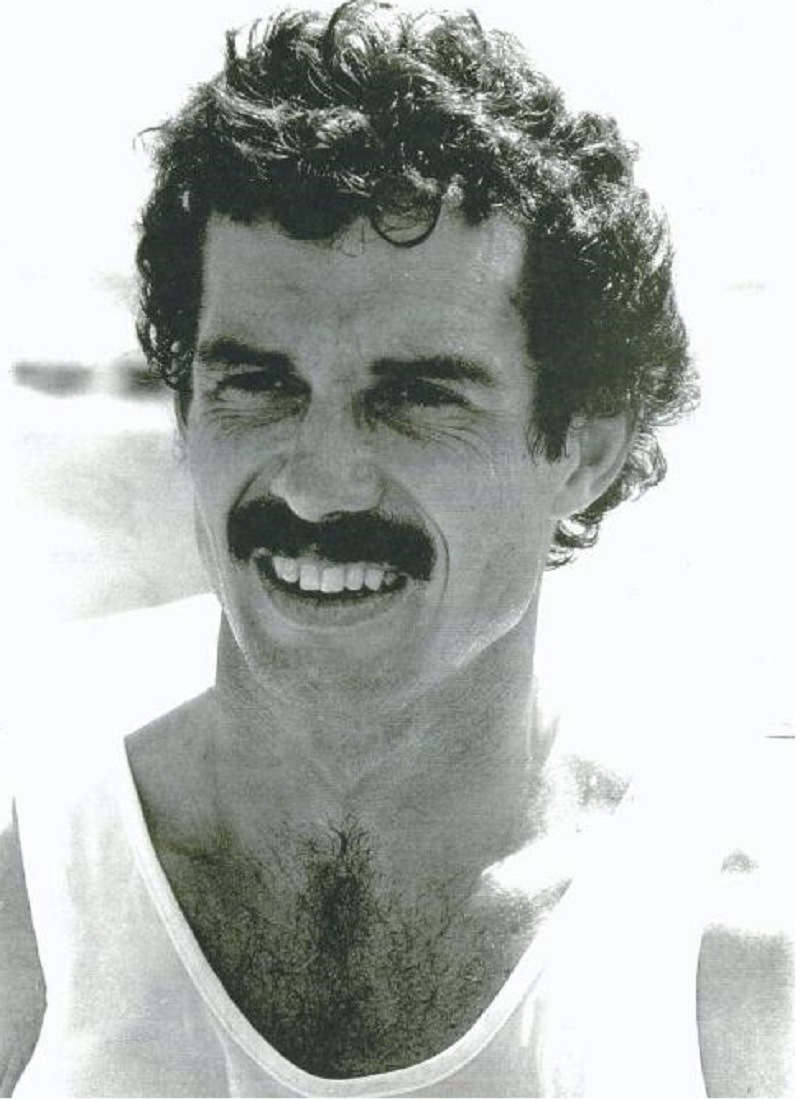
- Cummings after winning the 1986 Houston Marathon

Personal information
- Born: September 5, 1953 Tempe, Arizona, United States
- Died: September 17, 2001 (aged 48) Lehi, Utah

Sport
- Sport: Track, Long-distance running
- Events: 1500 meters, mile, 2-mile, 5000 meters, 10,000 meters, Half-marathon, marathon
- College team: BYU

Achievements and titles
- Personal bests: 1500 meters: 3:37.6; Mile: 3:56.4; 5000 meters: 13:19.62; 10,000 meters: 27:43.7; Half Marathon: 1:01:32; Marathon: 2:11:31

Paul Richard Cummings (September 5, 1953 – September 17, 2001) was a world-class middle and long distance runner who ran competitively from the 1,500 meters to the marathon, breaking several American records and one world record. His ability to have a middle distance runner's kick and also have the stamina to compete in distances up to the marathon place him as one of the most versatile American track and road racers of his era.

== Early life ==
Paul Cummings was born in Tempe, Arizona but his family moved to Santa Maria, California when he was 11 years old. Cummings was the third of thirteen children and had ten sisters. Cummings did not always see running as his strength. He played basketball in junior high, and wanted to continue in high school, but failed to make the team. However, when he came in first in his Physical Education class in the mile run, a new opportunity opened up for him; he was asked to join the track team at Ernest Righetti High School, and by his senior year was running the mile in 4:10, the second best time in California, seventh best in the country. Cummings was recruited by several top universities and chose to attend Brigham Young University.

== Brigham Young University (1971–1975) ==
Cummings was named All-American five years in a row while running on the Brigham Young University Track and Cross Country teams. However, after his Freshman year, he was diagnosed with an extra bone in his foot and in order to run again, would have to undergo surgery to remove the bone. Cummings recovered, and by his junior year became the NCAA champion in the mile run. A video of the race can be seen here.

Cummings was the first runner from the Intermountain West to break the Four-minute mile barrier. His personal best for the mile, 3:56.4, was run at his birthplace, Tempe, Arizona on March 16, 1974.

Cummings was a Latter-day Saint. He wanted to serve a two-year LDS mission, but since LDS Missions are served voluntarily and missionaries serve without compensation, he was unable to raise the required funds. After meeting with LDS Church President Spencer W. Kimball, Paul was encouraged to stay in school on an athletic scholarship, earn his degree, and continue to run and compete, sharing his beliefs with those he met through running. Paul did this well and shared his beliefs with many athletes and friends.

BYU Track Coach Clarence Robison said Cummings was "a great performer and has great courage. He's a tenacious, fierce competitor."

== Middle distance track racing ==
Cummings was invited to several of the most prestigious track and field meets during the 1970s. He won events at the Millrose Games, the Sunkist Invitational, the LA Times Indoor Games, the Jack in the Box Indoor Games, the Modesto Relays, and other events.

He competed against Steve Prefontaine, Frank Shorter, Tony Waldrop, Marty Liquori, Filbert Bayi, Wilson Waigwa, John Walker, Steve Scott, Eamonn Coghlan, Dick Buerkle, and several other top tier runners of the era, besting everyone on this list at least once. He ran in the Millrose Games Wanamaker Mile in 1974, 1975, 1976, and 1977, winning the event in 1976 in a Millrose Games record time of 3:57.6.

On April 25, 1976, Cummings won the Penn Relays 1500 Meter event at Franklin Field in Philadelphia in 3:38.9.

In 1976 he won the 3,000 meter event at Los Angeles's Sunkist Invitational Track Meet in 8:29.6, just five seconds off Steve Prefontaine's American Record set at the same meet the year before. In 1977 he won the Sunkist Invitational indoor mile in 3:57.2. Also in 1977, Cummings, representing the US, won the mile at Canada's Tri-Country indoor track and field meet, competing against Canada and the Soviet Union.

In January 1978 at the Muhammad Ali Track and Field Invitational at the Long Beach Arena in California, Cummings broke the indoor American record for the 1500 meters by .4 with a time of 3:39.8.

A year later, in January 1979 at the same Muhammad Ali Track and Field Invitational at the Long Beach Arena in California, both John Walker and Cummings finished under the indoor world record for the 1500 meters by .4 and .2 seconds respectively. Walker set a world record with a time of 3:37.4. Cummings set an American Record with a time of 3:37.6.

Cummings ran at a time when there was very little financial support for athletes after college. When attending track meets, several athletes would share the same hotel room, sleeping on floors, and carpool together to save costs. He worked at a steel mill rebuilding open hearth furnaces to support his family and ran for the Tobias Striders, Beverly Hills Striders and Pacific Coast track clubs to maintain his amateur status.

== 1984 US Olympic Team ==
Hoping to earn a spot on the 1980 US Olympic Team, working out over five hours per day, and working full-time six days a week at a steel mill, Cummings was one of many athletes disappointed by the U.S.'s boycott of the 1980 Moscow Summer Games. Due to work demands and disappointment at the 1980 boycott, Cummings came close to retiring altogether from running. When he was laid off from the mill in late 1980, he began running full-time.

In 1984, Cummings won the US Olympic Trials in the 10,000 Meter run in Los Angeles, CA and finally became a member of the US Olympic Team. A video of the race can be seen here.

He was able to compete in the 10,000 meter run at the Olympics held in Los Angeles, but did not make the finals. Cummings suffered from allergies that hindered his performance at the games.

== Road racing, American and World records ==
In 1981, Cummings shifted his focus from track to road racing. One of his first marathons was the St. George Marathon, which he won in 2:15.16, a course record that stood until 2017. He won the St. George Marathon again in 1982.

Taking advantage of new rules that enabled runners to compete professionally, Cummings represented New Balance shoes beginning in 1982.

On June 5, 1982, Cummings ran his PR in the 5,000 meters at the Prefontaine Classic track meet in Eugene, Oregon, running against some of the best American middle distance runners of the time, including Matt Centrowitz, Alberto Salazar and Doug Padilla. He ran towards the front for most of the race and ran 13:19.62, a Personal Record by 9 seconds, and just short of the American Record set by Matt Centrowitz in the same race. The following link shows the entire race on video in two parts. Part 1. Part 2.

Paul Cummings was very busy and successful running road races in 1983. He ran in the Boston Marathon with the lead pack for the first 10 miles of the race. The following link shows a picture of Paul running with Benji Durden and Greg Meyer (eventual race winner and only American Male to win until 2014). He set an American Record in the 15K by almost 28 seconds at the Cascade Run Off in Portland, Oregon on June 26, 1983. Cummings placed in the top 10 at Spokane Washington's Bloomsday 12K Run (8th in 1983 and 2nd in 1984). Paul also ran in the New York City Marathon in 1983.

On September 25, 1983, Cummings set the World Record in the Half marathon at the Dayton River Corridor Classic in Dayton, Ohio, with a time of 1:01:32.

Cummings represented Converse shoes beginning in 1984 and was included in Runner's World Magazine's list of the top 20 highest paid runners, ranked 15th worldwide, in 1984.

Paul's best marathon time came in winning the 1986 Houston Marathon in 2:11:31. His best finish at the Boston Marathon was 8th place overall in 1986. In the 1983 Stockholm Marathon, Cummings built up a 1-minute 12 second lead but suffered from cramps during the last 3 miles and narrowly lost to Hugh Jones of Great Britain, coming in 3rd place overall.

Cummings is the only runner to finish second in San Francisco's Bay to Breakers 12K road race (Guinness World Record largest road race) three years in a row (1984, 1985, and 1986).

On March 15, 1987, Cummings broke the American Record in the 20K, at New Bedford, Massachusetts, in a time of 59.13.

Cummings continued running into his 40s. He won the US Master's National Championship for the Marathon in 1993 at the Twin Cities Marathon. He was also awarded the USA Track and Field (USATF) Master's Age Division (Age 40+) Runner of the Year in 1993.

Cummings won the 1994 Walt Disney World Marathon Master's division in 2:27:50.

In 1993 competed at the 1993 Masters National Outdoor Championship winning the M35 1500 meter run.

== Contributions ==
In the 1980s, Cummings, along with fellow Utah world class runners Ed Eyestone and Paul Pilkington started a summer high school high altitude running camp in Park City, Utah which ran for 15 years and helped hundreds of high school runners from across the country reach their potential.

In 1990, Cummings created a running video entitled "Running Theory: From Mile to Marathon" that expounded on "Consistency Training" which is an adaptation to Arthur Lydiard's four step "Phase Training". The four components of consistency training include: upper body strength training, endurance training, 70% effort training, and anaerobic capacity training.

Cummings explored the outer reaches of human endurance in his road race and marathon training, approaching the legendary endurance strategies of Gerry Lindgren. He ran up to 240 miles in one week, training three times a day with runs of 13 miles in the morning, 14 in the afternoon, and another 13 in the evening for six days. He rested on Sundays.

Cummings was inducted into the Brigham Young University Athletics Hall of Fame in 1986. He was inducted into the Dayton Distance Running Hall of Fame, also in 1986 for his 1983 Half Marathon World Record Performance in Dayton, Ohio. He was posthumously inducted into the Utah Sports Hall of Fame in 2003.

== Death ==
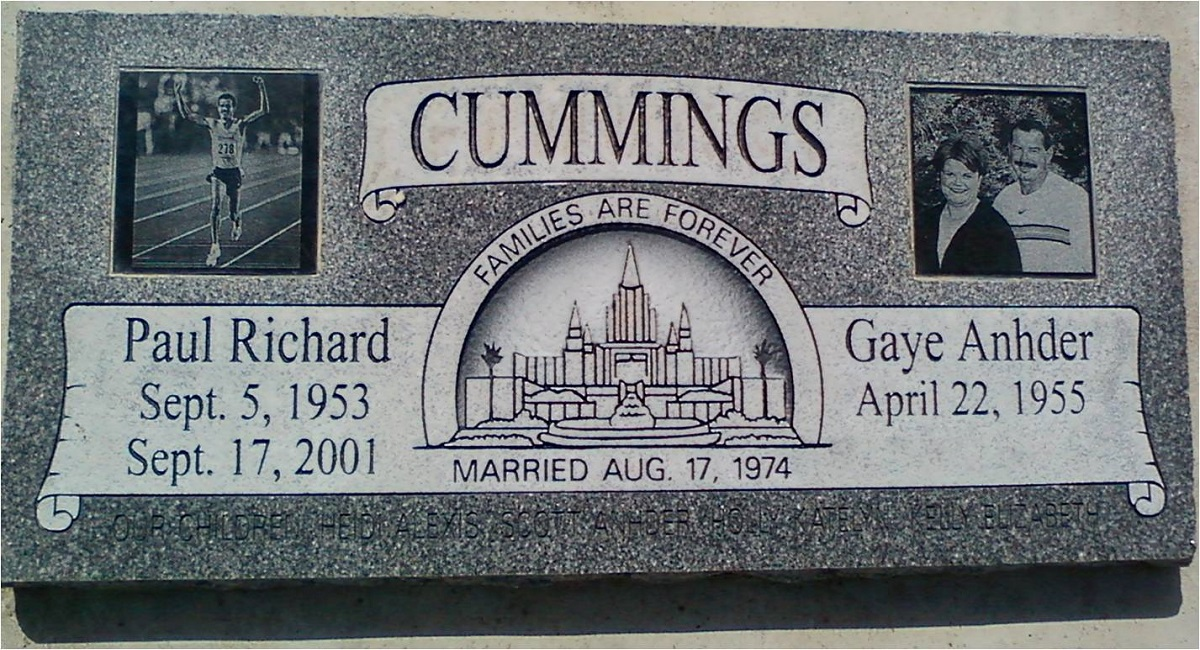
Paul Cummings Gravesite, Lehi City Cemetery, Utah

Cummings enjoyed fishing, especially with his best friend Jay Woods. While fishing together on September 17, 2001, their canoe capsized under high winds at Strawberry Reservoir, Utah. He drowned in the accident. Paul was married for 27 years to Debra Gaye Anhder. They were the parents of four children; Heidi, Scott, Holly and Kelly. He is interred at the Lehi City Cemetery, Lehi, Utah.

== Personal records ==
Distance	Time	Date	Location
1,500 meters	3:37.6 (American Record)	12 January 1979	Long Beach, California
Mile	3:56.4	16 March 1974	Tempe, Arizona
2 Miles	8:25.2	12 April 1982	Los Angeles, California
3000 meter Steeplechase	8:52.5	26 April 1979	Provo, Utah
3,000 meters	8:29.6	12 February 1976	Los Angeles, California
5,000 meters	13:19.62	5 June 1982	Eugene, Oregon
10,000 meters	27:43.7	28 April 1984	Walnut, California
12 kilometers	34:42	6 May 1984	Spokane, Washington
15 kilometers	42:42 (American Record)	26 June 1983	Portland, Oregon
20 kilometers	59:13 (American Record)	15 March 1987	New Bedford, Massachusetts
Half Marathon	1:01.32 (World Record)	25 September 1983	Dayton, Ohio
Marathon	2:11.31	19 January 1986	Houston, Texas

== Half Marathon World record ==
RANK	1983 WORLD BEST PERFORMERS	TIME
1.	Paul Cummings (USA)	1:01:32 WR

Sporting positions
Preceded by Michael Musyoki	Men's Half Marathon Best Year Performance; 1983	Succeeded by Alberto Cova
