= Wanamaker Mile =

Annual indoor mile race

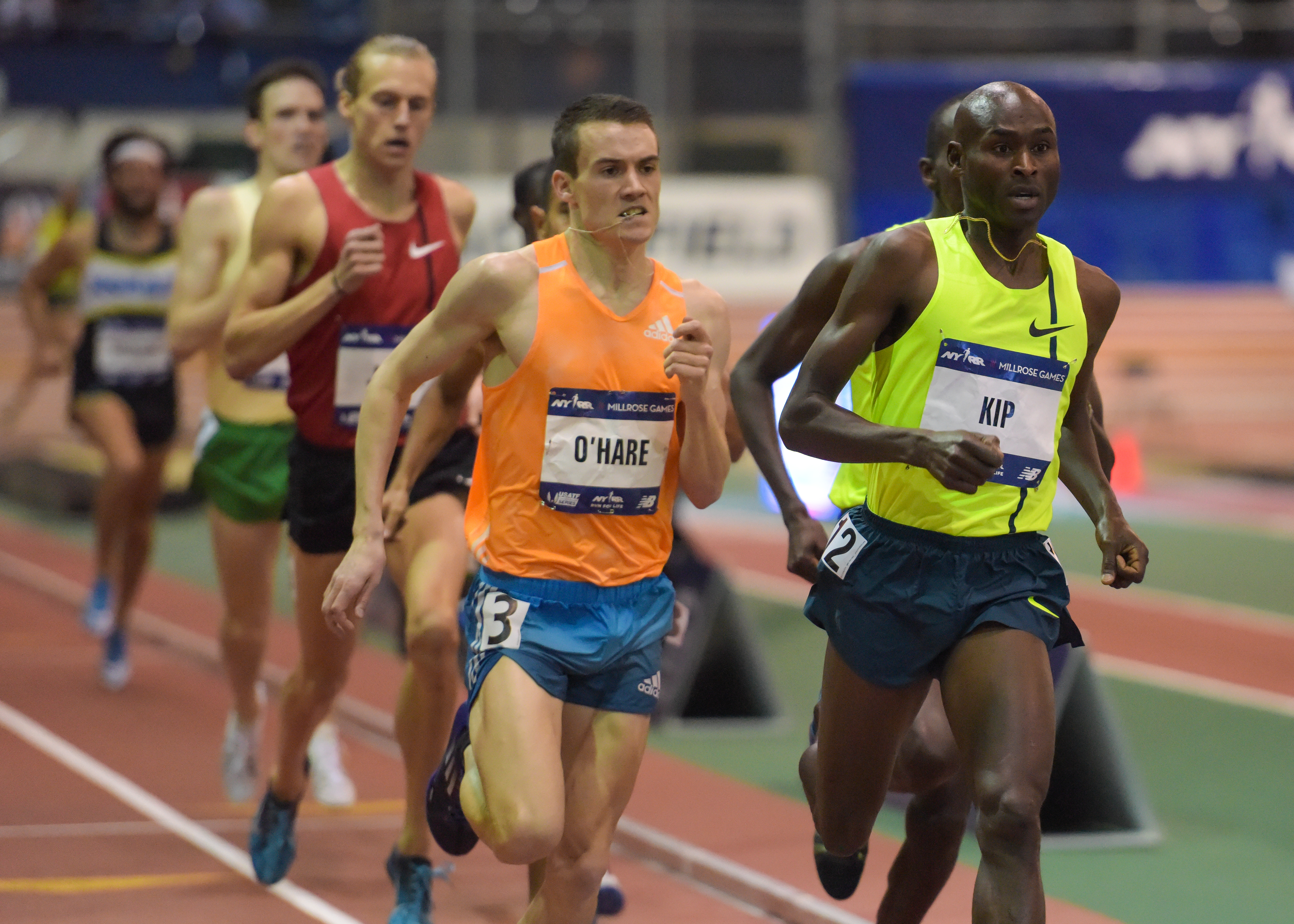
- The 2015 Men's Wanamaker Mile. Leading above are Bernard Lagat & Chris O'Hare.
- Date: February
- Location: Fort Washington Avenue Armory; New York City, United States
- Event type: Indoor track and field
- Distance: 1 mile (since 1926); 1.5 miles (1916–1925); 2 miles (1915)
- Established: 1915 (as Wanamaker 2-Mile)
- Organizer: Millrose Games
- Course records: M: (United States) Yared Nuguse 3:46.63 (2025); W: (United States) Elinor Purrier 4:16.41 (2024)
- Website: The Wanamaker Mile

The Wanamaker Mile is an indoor mile race (1,609.344 m) for elite middle distance runners held annually at the Millrose Games in New York City. Alongside Oslo's Dream Mile and Eugene's Bowerman Mile, the Wanamaker Mile is among the world's premier mile races. It is the signature and concluding event of the Millrose Games, and is named in honor of department store owner Rodman Wanamaker.

The race is a tradition for Irish runners: past Irish winners include Ronnie Delany (1956–1959), Eamonn Coghlan (1977, '79–'81, '83, '85 and '87), Marcus O'Sullivan (1986, '88–'90 and 1992), Niall Bruton (1994 and 1996), and Mark Carroll (2000). Ray Flynn, the Irish record holder in the mile and the current meeting director of the Millrose Games, has also competed in the Wanamaker Mile.

It was at the Millrose Games that Coghlan earned the nickname "Chairman of the Boards" (from the surface of the track being made of wooden boards). O'Sullivan has run 11 sub-four-minute miles in the Wanamaker.

The Wanamaker Mile has been won by over 40 different men, including Glenn Cunningham, Kip Keino, Tony Waldrop, Filbert Bayi, Steve Scott, Noureddine Morceli, Bernard Lagat, Yared Nuguse, Matthew Centrowitz Jr., Dave Patrick, Marcus O'Sullivan, Ron Delany, and Eamonn Coghlan.

== History ==
The Millrose Games were first held in a local armory in 1908, being organized by the employees of Wanamaker's New York City department store. The employees formed the recreational Millrose Athletic Association. "Millrose" was the name of the country home of Rodman Wanamaker in Cheltenham, Pennsylvania. When this local armory overflowed, the Millrose Games were moved to Madison Square Garden in 1914.

In 1915, the "Wanamaker 2 Mile Race" was held. From 1916 to 1925, the games' signature event was the 1.5 mile run. In 1925, the last edition of the "Wanamaker 1.5 Mile Race" was won by "Flying Finn" Paavo Nurmi, the nine-time Olympic gold medalist from Finland. In 1926, the race was shortened to one mile, and thus the Wanamaker Mile was born. The winner of the 1926 race was James J. Connolly, who had represented the United States at the 1920 and 1924 Olympics.

In the 1929 Wanamaker, American athlete Ray Conger became the first and only athlete to defeat and upset "Flying Finn" Paavo Nurmi in the mile. Although Conger was modest about his win, he would be known as "the man who beat Nurmi" for decades.

The first time the Wanamaker Mile was won in a sub-four minute time was by American athlete Tony Waldrop in 1974, in 3:59.7. The first women's race for the Wanamaker Mile was held in 1982, and was won by Mary Decker.

The Wanamaker Mile was once held every year at 10:00 p.m., a tradition started by the legendary sports announcer Ted Husing. Husing would broadcast the race live on radio during the nightly news. In 2002, the mile was moved to 9 p.m. to accommodate television coverage.

Madison Square Garden, which possessed a 146-meter track, was the venue for the race from 1914 until 2012, when it was moved to The Armory in Upper Manhattan, a much faster 200-meter mondo track. Accompanying this venue change, the Millrose Games and therefore the Wanamaker Mile shifted from a Friday evening format to an all-day Saturday format. By 2018, the start time had been moved to late afternoon when it was nationally televised live on NBC.

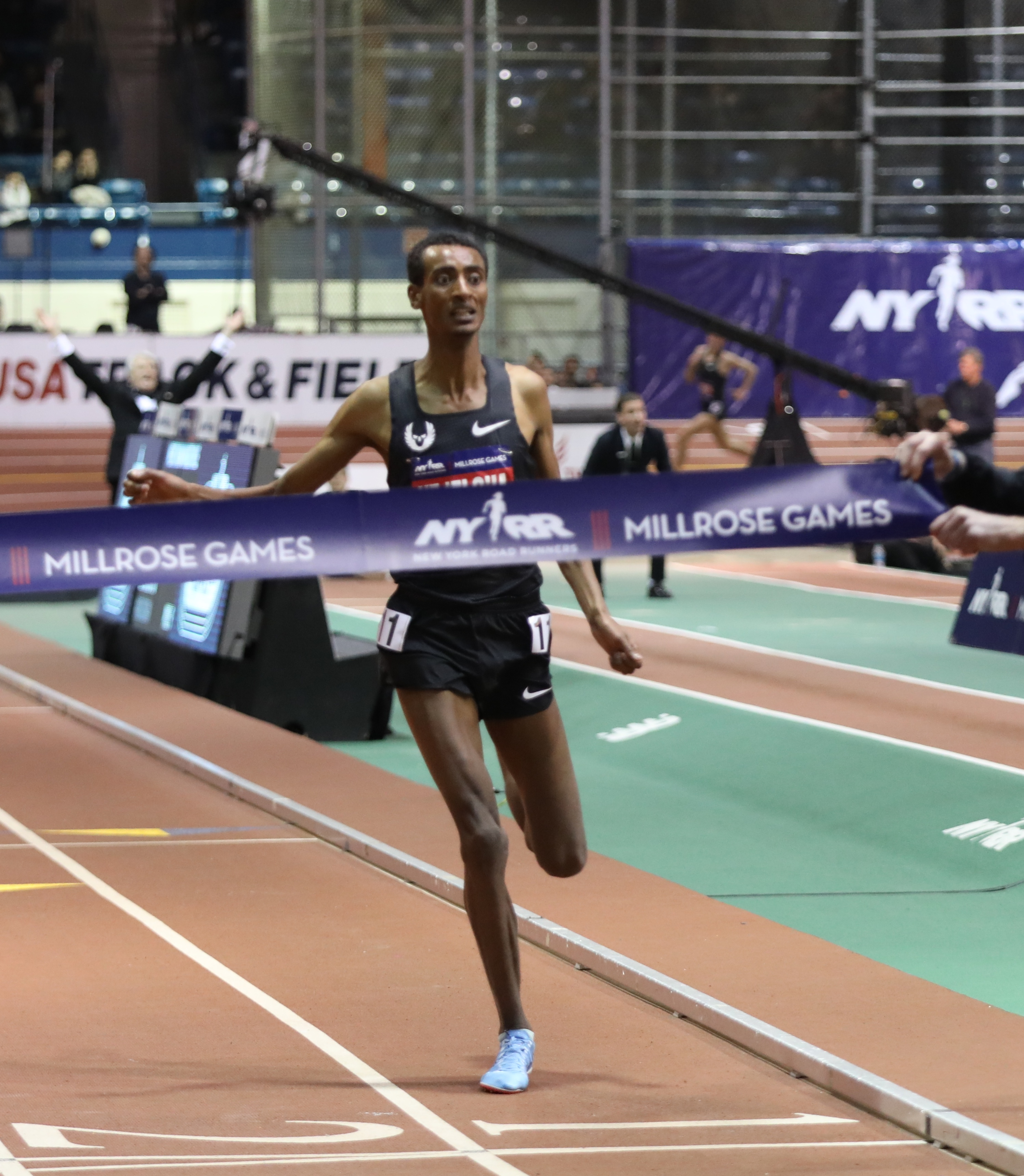
Yomif Kejelcha in the 2019 Wanamaker Mile.

In the 2019 Wanamaker Mile, Yomif Kejelcha won in 3:48.46 to miss Hicham El Guerrouj's then-world record of 3:48.45 by just one hundredth of a second. Kejelcha would later go on to break El Guerrouj's indoor mile world record by almost 1.5 seconds in Boston, with a time of 3:47.01.

In the 2023 Wanamaker Mile, Yared Nuguse ran an American record time of 3:47.38, missing Kejelcha's 3:47.01 mark by .37 seconds. In 2024, Nuguse defended his Wanamaker Mile title, in a time of 3:47.83, but did not run faster than he did in 2023.

In the 2025 Wanamaker Mile, Nuguse broke Kejelcha's world record of 3:47.01, clocking a new world record of 3:46.63. Finishing behind Nuguse was Hobbs Kessler in 3:46.90, also under the previous record. Cameron Myers set a world under-20 record and Australian record of 3:47.48, while Azeddine Habz set a French record of 3:47.56, and Andrew Coscoran set an Irish record of 3:49.26. Nuguse's world record lasted for 5 days, until Jakob Ingebrigtsen ran 3:45.14 in Liévin, France.

== Sponsors ==
The sponsors of the Wanamaker Mile have varied over the years, with the NYRR often supporting the race. In 2023, the Rudin family sponsored the event in the 115th Millrose Games.

== Records ==
In 2010, Bernard Lagat surpassed Eamonn Coghlan's record of seven Wanamaker Mile victories with his eighth victory. Prior to Coghlan, Glenn Cunningham was among the first men to dominate the event, winning six out of seven Wanamaker Miles from 1933 to 1939.

Mary Decker, Doina Melinte and Regina Jacobs are all tied for most Wanamaker victories on the women's side, with three wins each.

The current men's event record in the Wanamaker Mile is held by American athlete Yared Nuguse, who ran a world record time of 3:46.63 in the 2025 Wanamaker Mile, improving Yomif Kejelcha's 2019 indoor mile world record of 3:47.01 by 0.38 seconds.

The current women's event record in the Wanamaker Mile was set in 2024 by American athlete Elinor Purrier, with a time of 4:16.41, also the American record. Purrier had eclipsed her previous 2020 American record time of 4:16.85 during this race.

== Annual champions ==
Key:

Meet record (bolded)
1500 meter race (women only)

=== Men ===
Year	Athlete	Country	Time	Ref.
Armory Era
2026	Cam Myers	Australia	3:47.57	
2025	Yared Nuguse	United States	**3:46.63**	
2024	Yared Nuguse	United States	3:47.83	
2023	Yared Nuguse	United States	3:47.38	
2022	Ollie Hoare	Australia	3:50.83	
2021	Meet cancelled due to COVID-19			
2020	Chris O'Hare	Great Britain	3:55.61	
2019	Yomif Kejelcha	Ethiopia	3:48.46	
2018	Chris O'Hare	Great Britain	3:54.14	
2017	Eric Jenkins	United States	3:53.23	
2016	Matt Centrowitz Jr.	United States	3:50.63	
2015	Matt Centrowitz Jr.	United States	3:51.35	
2014	Will Leer	United States	3:52.47	
2013	Lopez Lomong	United States	3:51.21	
2012	Matt Centrowitz Jr.	United States	3:53.92	
Madison Square Garden Era
2011	Deresse Mekonnen	Ethiopia	3:58.58	
2010	Bernard Lagat	United States	3:56.34	
2009	Bernard Lagat	United States	3:58.44	
2008	Bernard Lagat	United States	3:57.91	
2007	Bernard Lagat	United States	3:54.26	
2006	Bernard Lagat	United States	3:56.85	
2005	Bernard Lagat	United States	3:52.87	
2004	Hudson De Souza	Brazil	4:02.93	
2003	Bernard Lagat	Kenya	4:00.36	
2002	Laban Rotich	Kenya	3:57.04	
2001	Bernard Lagat	Kenya	3:58.26	
2000	Mark Carroll	Ireland	3:58.19	
1999	William Tanui	Kenya	3:59.24	
1998	Laban Rotich	Kenya	3:55.69	
1997	Isaac Viciosa	Spain	3:59.34	
1996	Niall Bruton	Ireland	4:00.58	
1995	Graham Hood	Canada	3:57.08	
1994	Niall Bruton	Ireland	3:58.71	
1993	Noureddine Morceli	Algeria	3:55.06	
1992	Marcus O’Sullivan	Ireland	4:00.65	
1991	Noureddine Morceli	Algeria	3:53.50	
1990	Marcus O’Sullivan	Ireland	3:59.35	
1989	Marcus O’Sullivan	Ireland	3:54.27	
1988	Marcus O’Sullivan	Ireland	3:56.89	
1987	Eamonn Coghlan	Ireland	3:55.91	
1986	Marcus O'Sullivan	Ireland	3:56.05	
1985	Eamonn Coghlan	Ireland	3:53.82	
1984	Steve Scott	United States	3:59.38	
1983	Eamonn Coghlan	Ireland	3:54.40	
1982	Steve Scott	United States	3:55.37	
1981	Eamonn Coghlan	Ireland	3:53.0	
1980	Eamonn Coghlan	Ireland	3:58.2	
1979	Eamonn Coghlan	Ireland	3:55.0	
1978	Dick Buerkle	United States	3.58.4	
1977	Eamonn Coghlan	Ireland	4.00.2	
1976	Paul Cummings	United States	3.57.6	
1975	Filbert Bayi	Tanzania	3:59.3	
1974	Tony Waldrop	United States	3:59.7	
1973	Henryk Szordykowski	Poland	4:04.4	
1972	John Mason	United States	4:03.2	
1971	Marty Liquori	United States	4:00.6	
1970	Marty Liquori	United States	4:02.6	
1969	Marty Liquori	United States	4:00.8	
1968	Preston Davis	United States	4:03.9	
1967	Dave Patrick	United States	4:03.7	
1966	Kipchoge Keino	Kenya	4:03.9	
1965	John Whetton	England	4:05.4	
1964	Tom O'Hara	United States	4:00.6	
1963	Tom O'Hara	United States	4:01.5	
1962	Peter Close	United States	4:08.6	
1961	Istvan Rozsavolgyi	Hungary	4:06.0	
1960	James Grelle	United States	4:06.4	
1959	Ron Delany	Ireland	4:06.5	
1958	Ron Delany	Ireland	4:04.6	
1957	Ron Delany	Ireland	4:06.7	
1956	Ron Delany	Ireland	4:09.5	
1955	Gunnar Nielsen	Denmark	4:03.6	
1954	Josy Barthel	Luxembourg	4:07.5	
1953	Fred Dwyer	United States	4:08.2	
1952	Don A. Gehrmann	United States	4:11.2	
1951	Don A. Gehrmann	United States	4:07.5	
1950	Don A. Gehrmann	United States	4:09.3	
1949	Don A. Gehrmann	United States	4:09.5	
1948	Gilbert Dodds	United States	4:05.3	
1947	Gilbert Dodds	United States	4:09.2	
1946	Leslie MacMitchell	United States	4:19.0	
1945	James Rafferty	United States	4:13.1	
1944	Gilbert Dodds	United States	4:10.6	
1943	Earl Mitchell	United States	4:08.6	
1942	Leslie MacMitchell	United States	4:11.3	
1941	Walter J. Mehl	United States	4:13.6	
1940	Charles H. Fenske	United States	4:07.4	
1939	Glenn Cunningham	United States	4:13.0	
1938	Glenn Cunningham	United States	4:11.0	
1937	Glenn Cunningham	United States	4:14.4	
1936	Joseph R. Mangan	United States	4:11.0	
1935	Glenn Cunningham	United States	4:11.0	
1934	Glenn Cunningham	United States	4:11.2	
1933	Glenn Cunningham	United States	4:13.0	
1932	Gene Venzke	United States	4:11.2	
1931	Ray Conger	United States	4:13.6	
1930	Ray Conger	United States	4:21.8	
1929	Ray Conger	United States	4:17.4	
1928	Lloyd Hahn	United States	4:18.6	
1927	Lloyd Hahn	United States	4:15.6	
1926	James J. Connolly	United States	4:17.2	
Wanamaker 1.5-Mile
1925	Paavo Nurmi	Finland	6:39.4	
1924	Joie W. Ray	United States	6:48.8	
1923	Joie W. Ray	United States	6:41.8	
1922	Joie W. Ray	United States	6:42.8	
1921	Harold C. Cutbill	United States	6:55.6	
1920	Joie W. Ray	United States	6:52.2	
1919	Joie W. Ray	United States	6:51.0	
1918	Joie W. Ray	United States	6:57.8	
1917	Joie W. Ray	United States	6:45.0	
1916	John W. Overton	United States	6:53.0	
Wanamaker 2-Mile
1915	Sydney Leslie	[?]	9:20 3/5	

=== Women ===
Year	Athlete	Country	Time	Ref.
Armory Era
2026	Nikki Hiltz	United States	4:19.64	
2025	Georgia Bell	Great Britain	4:23.25	
2024	Elinor St. Pierre	United States	**4:16.41**	
2023	Laura Muir	Great Britain	4:20.15	
2022	Elinor St. Pierre	United States	4:19.30	
2021	Meet cancelled due to COVID-19			
2020	Elinor Purrier	United States	4:16.85	
2019	Konstanze Klosterhalfen	Germany	4:19.98	
2018	Colleen Quigley	United States	4:30.05	
2017	Sifan Hassan	Netherlands	4:19.89	
2016	Shannon Rowbury	United States	4:24.39	
2015	Shannon Rowbury	United States	4:24.32	
2014	Mary Cain	United States	4:27.73	
2013	Sheila Reid	Canada	4:27.02	
2012	Jenny Simpson	United States	4:07.27	
Madison Square Garden Era
2011	Sara Hall	United States	4:15.35	
2010	Hannah England	Great Britain	4:31.48	
2009	Kara Goucher	United States	4:33.19	
2008	Kara Goucher	United States	4:36.03	
2007	Not Held			
2006	Carmen Douma-Hussar	Canada	4:35.64	
2005	Carmen Douma-Hussar	Canada	4:32.47	
2004	Carmen Douma-Hussar	Canada	4:16.78	
2003	Elena Iagar	Romania	4:36.08	
2002	Regina Jacobs	United States	4:34.60	
2001	Regina Jacobs	United States	4:42.15	
2000	Regina Jacobs	United States	4:24.04	
1999	Regina Jacobs	United States	4:31.65	
1998	Suzy Hamilton	United States	4:30.91	
1997	Mary Decker	United States	4:26.67	
1996	Kathy Franey	United States	4:36.46	
1995	Angela Chalmers	Canada	4:31.66	
1994	Hassiba Boulmerka	Algeria	4:30.01	
1993	Shelly Steely	United States	4:32.27	
1992	Doina Melinte	Romania	4:30.03	
1991	Doina Melinte	Romania	4:33.81	
1990	Doina Melinte	Romania	4:31.40	
1989	Paula Ivan	Romania	4:23.72	
1988	Doina Melinte	Romania	4:21.45	
1987	Lynn Williams	Canada	4:36.71	
1986	Wendy Sly	Great Britain	4:28.58	
1985	Mary Decker	United States	4:22.10	
1984	Cindy Bremser	United States	4:35.81	
1983	Mary Decker	United States	4:25.27	
1982	Mary Decker	United States	4:21.47	
1981	Maggie Keyes	United States	4:14.9	
1980	Mary Decker	United States	4:00.8	
1979	Francie Larrieu	United States	4:15.0	
1978	Jan Merrill	United States	4:19.7	
1977	Francie Larrieu	United States	4:15.8	
1976	Jan Merrill	United States	4:15.2	

== See also ==
- Mile run world record progression
- Four-minute mile
- Dicksonpokalen
- Dream Mile
- Emsley Carr Mile
- Bowerman Mile
