= Harold Cutbill =

American athlete (1897–1977)

Personal information
- Born: September 9, 1897 Rowayton, Connecticut, U.S.
- Died: July 24, 1977 (aged 79) Norwalk, Connecticut, U.S.

Sport
- Sport: Track
- College team: Wesleyan
- Club: Boston A.A. (1919–1929); Millrose A.C. (post 1929)
- Coached by: Jack Ryder

Harold Clifford Cutbill (September 9, 1897 – July 24, 1977) was an American track and field athlete who won the 1921 Wanamaker Mile and the 1922 USA Indoor Track and Field Championships in the 1000 yards. An ordained minister, he was nicknamed "The Flying Parson".

== Early life ==
Cutbill was born on September 9, 1897, in Rowayton, Connecticut. He attended Norwalk High School, where he was a member of the football team. He earned a Bachelor of Science from Wesleyan University in 1919.

== Track career ==
Cutbill was a member of the track team at Wesleyan and tied the school record for the half-mile in 1919. That same year, he won the half-mile at the New England Intercollegiate Athletic Association championships, helping Wesleyan to a second-place finish.

After graduating, Cutbill moved to Boston to continue his education at Boston University. Wanting to compete in the 1920 Summer Olympics, he sought the services of Boston Athletic Association coach Jack Ryder. In 1920, he represented the B.A.A. in the Hunter Mile, the feature race of the Boston Athletic Association Indoor Games. Although he did not win, he performed well enough to earn invitations to other indoor meets that winter. He beat Michael Devaney in the New York Athletic Club’s Baxter Mile and finished second to Joie Ray five times. At that year's New England indoor championships, he won the 1000 yards and finished second in the two miles that same night. He was badly beaten at the 1920 Olympic trials and was not selected for the Olympic team. That September, he won the mile handicap at the New England Fair.

Cutbill opened his 1920–21 indoor season with a close loss to W. C. Baldwin in the one mile at the Boston YMCA meet. On December 31, 1920, Cutbill was chosen to succeed the retiring Thomas Halpin as captain of the B.A.A. track team. He won the Brooklyn College Thousand, the Hunter Mile, Wanamaker Mile, and 1000-yard handicap at the Central High School games. His first loss of the calendar year came at the Guaranty Club games at Madison Square Garden, where he was beaten by Tom Campbell in the 1000-yard race. Cutbill faced Joie Ray in a Wanamaker Mile rematch in the one-mile Boston Cup race at the American Legion games. This time, Ray was victorious, with Cutbill finishing third behind him and James Connolly. On March 11, 1921, Cutbill, who was nursing an injured ankle, announced that he would stop running for a while and focus on preaching.

On June 4, 1921, Cutbill won the invitational mile at the American Legion field day at Franklin Field. Later the month, he won the half-mile at The English High School centenary games . At the Boston Caledonian Club's Scottish picnic meet, Cutbill was upset in the mile by John Doherty. He then won the 580 yards at the Waltham Fair and the 880 yards at City of Boston's Columbus Day meet. He finished second to James Henigan in the New England A.A.U. cross country run at Franklin Park.

Cutbill started 1922 by repeating as winner of the 1000-yard race at the Brooklyn College games. After completing the race, he took a train back to Boston so he could take charge of church services the following morning. He finished second to Joie Ray in the Millrose Games mile-and-a-half race and the B.A.A.’s Hunter Mile, but beat him in the 1000-yard run at the National A.A.U. championships in Buffalo. He also won the 1000 yard special at the New York metropolitan A.A.U. championship, the mile handicap at the Wilco Athletic Association games, and the NYAC's Baxter Mile. On March 18, he broke the world's record in the 1000-yard run at the 174th Regiment indoor games in Buffalo.

== Ministry ==
Cutbill was ordained as a Methodist Episcopal minister in 1920 and was an assistant pastor at the Bromfield Street Church and Tremont Street Methodist Episcopal Church. He earned his Bachelor of Sacred Theology from Boston University in 1922 and received a scholarship to study at the Harvard Divinity School. In 1924, he was ordained into the Congregationalist church and began preaching at the West Boxford Congregationalist Church in Boxford, Massachusetts. In 1926, he received a Master of Religious Education from B.U. That same year, he became the pastor of a Congregational church in Seekonk, Massachusetts.

From 1923 to 1929, Cutbill was also the vocational director at Fisher College.

On February 10, 1929, Cutbill resigned as pastor of his church to become director of individual programs for the Executive Service Corporation of New York, an employment agency founded by followers of Rev. Harry Emerson Fosdick. He stated that "church attendance is no longer popular" and believed the fields of business and athletics had become the center of religious activity. His new position also allowed him more time to compete in track.

== Suspension ==
On February 28, 1922, Cutbill won a special 1000-yard race at the Hartford Industrial Athletic League meet at the State Armory in Hartford, Connecticut. On April 1, the race promoters filed charges with the commissioner of the Hartford A.A.U, alleging Cutbill had demanded $60 to run in the race, but could only account for $26.90 in expenses. On May 26, the AAU suspended Cutbill. He applied for reinstatement in 1923, but his petition was denied.

== Comeback ==
On November 21, 1927, the AAU lifted Cutbill's suspension. He returned to track on February 22, 1928, at the Masonic benefit meet in New York City. He finished third out of four runners in the 800 metres. On August 1, 1929, he won the 600-yard feature of the Jameson Day Fund meet in Paterson, New Jersey.

In 1930, Cutbill, now a member of the Millrose Athletic Club, won the 1000-yard race at the Brooklyn Evening High School games, the 880-yard invitational at the Pastime Athletic Club meet, and the Boston Caledonian Club's Walter Scott Mile.

== Later life ==
In 1930, he married Beatrice G. Schmidt of New Canaan, Connecticut. That same year, he became an investment counselor for Studley, Shupert & Co. He later worked as a salesman for the Wilson Safety Device Company. In 1958, he married Edith Sheperd in Westport, Connecticut. Cutbill died on July 24, 1977, at his home in Norwalk, Connecticut.
