= James E. Sullivan Award =

American amateur athletics award

AAU James E. Sullivan Award
- Awarded for: The most outstanding athlete at the collegiate or Olympic level in the U.S. who demonstrates qualities of leadership, citizenship, character and sportsmanship on and off the field.
- Country: United States
- Presented by: Amateur Athletic Union
- First award: 1930
- Currently held by: Tatyana McFadden (2025)
- Website: aausullivan.org

The AAU James E. Sullivan Award, presented by the Amateur Athletic Union (AAU), is awarded annually to "the most outstanding athlete at the collegiate or Olympic level in the United States". (Note: In North American English, athletics is synonymous with sports in general, making the terms athlete and sportsperson synonyms. In many other forms of English, notably British English, athlete refers strictly to a participant in the sport of athletics.)

The award was established in 1930 in honor of the organization's founder and past president, James Edward Sullivan. Based on the qualities of leadership, character, and sportsmanship, the AAU Sullivan Award "goes far beyond athletic accomplishments and honors those who have shown strong moral character". Finalists are selected from public nominations following a review by the AAU Sullivan Award Executive Committee. Approximately 10 semi-finalists are chosen, and the eventual winner is determined by votes from various members of the nationwide news media, former winners and AAU personnel. More recently, a portion of the winner's vote has been determined by the general public. Recipients are eligible for subsequent awards, and in 2023, Caitlin Clark became the first repeat winner. In 1999, 2015, 2019, and 2020, the award was shared between two co-recipients.

The inaugural winner of the award was golfer Bobby Jones, winner of 13 majors between 1923 and 1930. The first female recipient, in 1944, was swimmer Ann Curtis, who won more national AAU championships than any other woman. 34 track and field athletes have won the AAU Sullivan Award—the most by any sport.

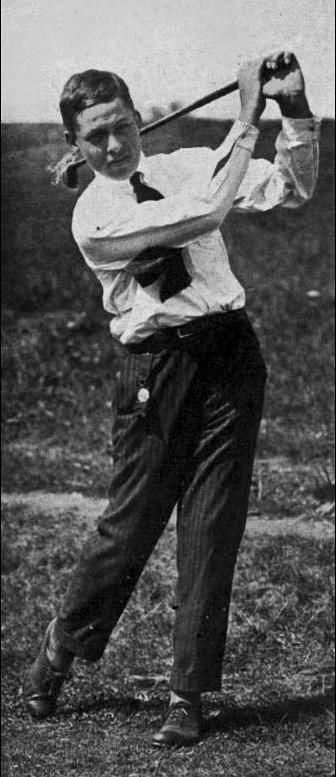
Golfer Bobby Jones won the inaugural award in 1930.

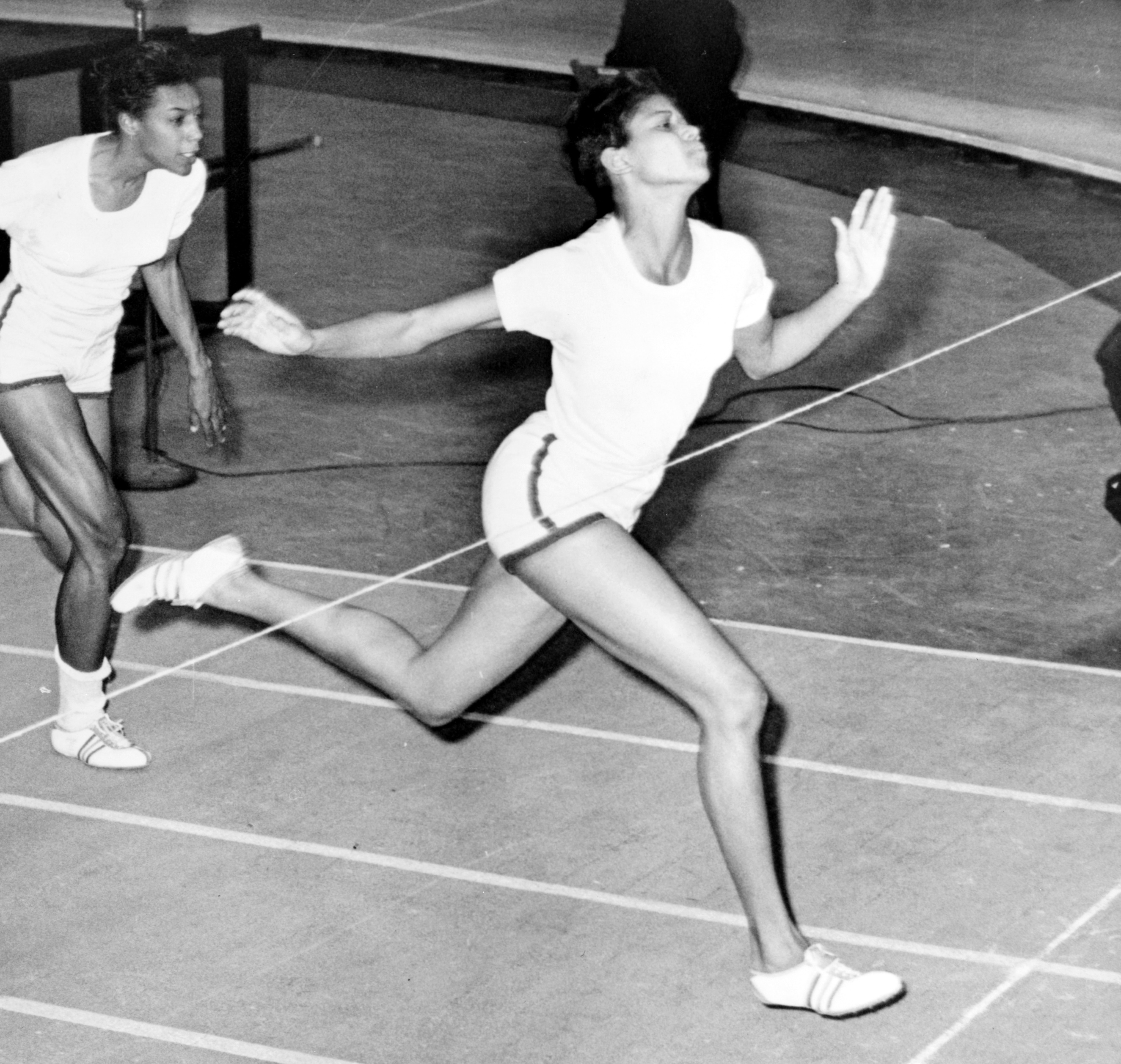
Wilma Rudolph received the accolade in 1961.

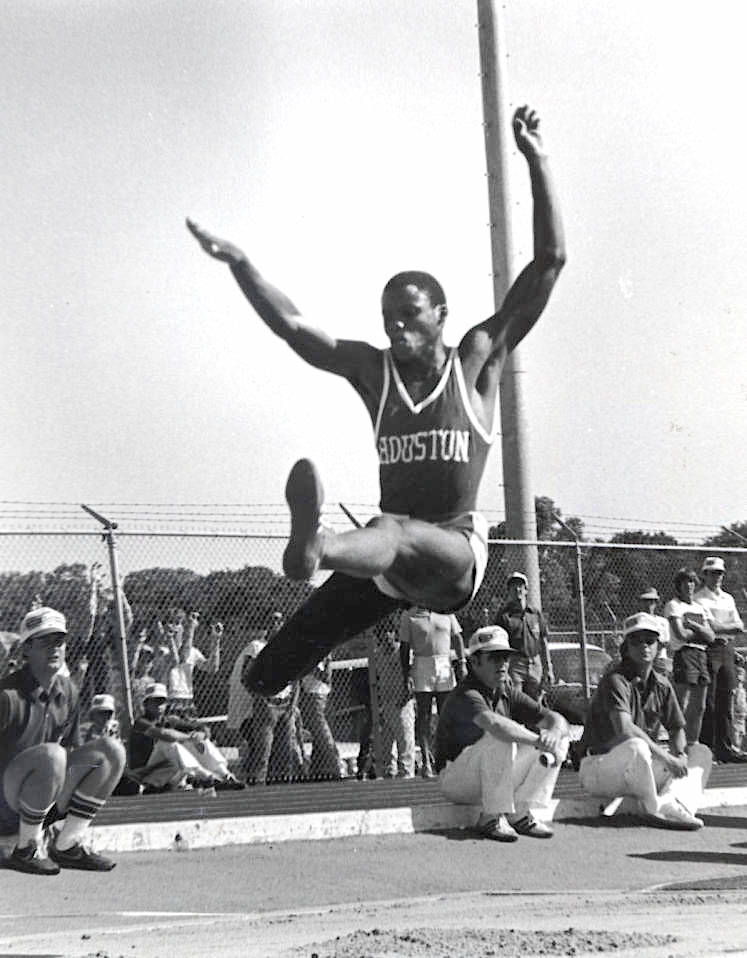
Track athlete Carl Lewis received the award in 1981.

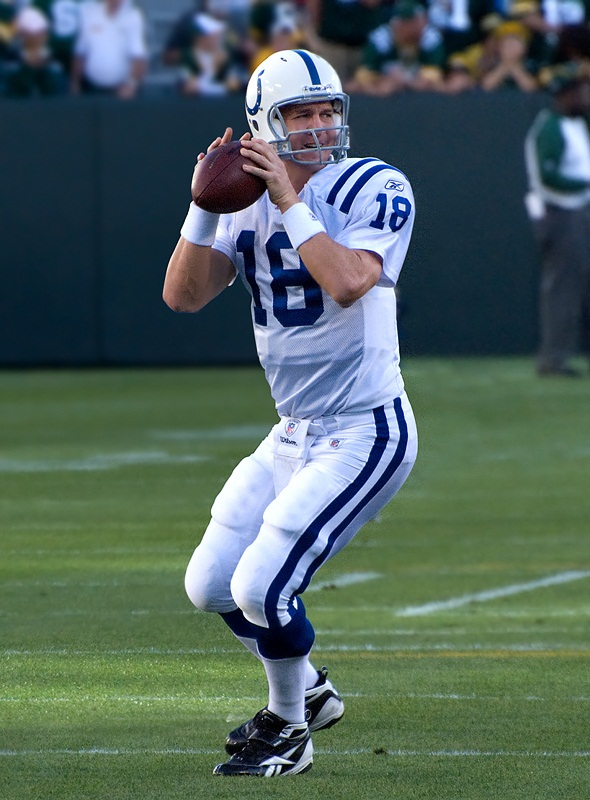
Peyton Manning won the award in 1997.

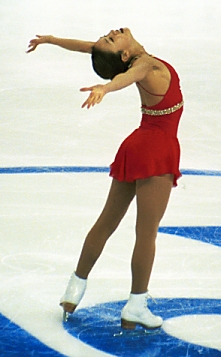
Figure skater, Michelle Kwan, took the honor in 2001.

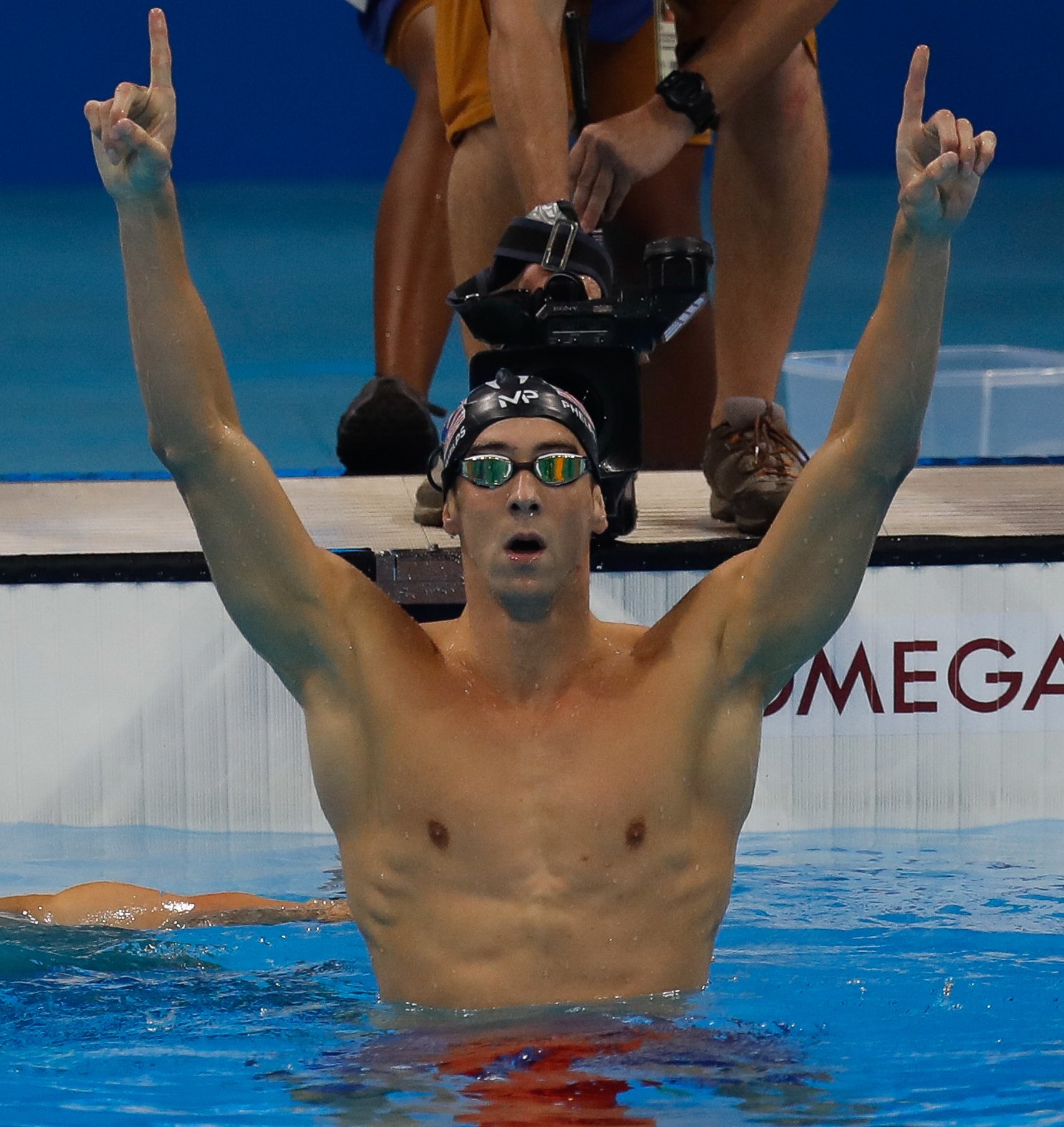
Swimmer and most decorated Olympian of all time Michael Phelps won the award in 2003.

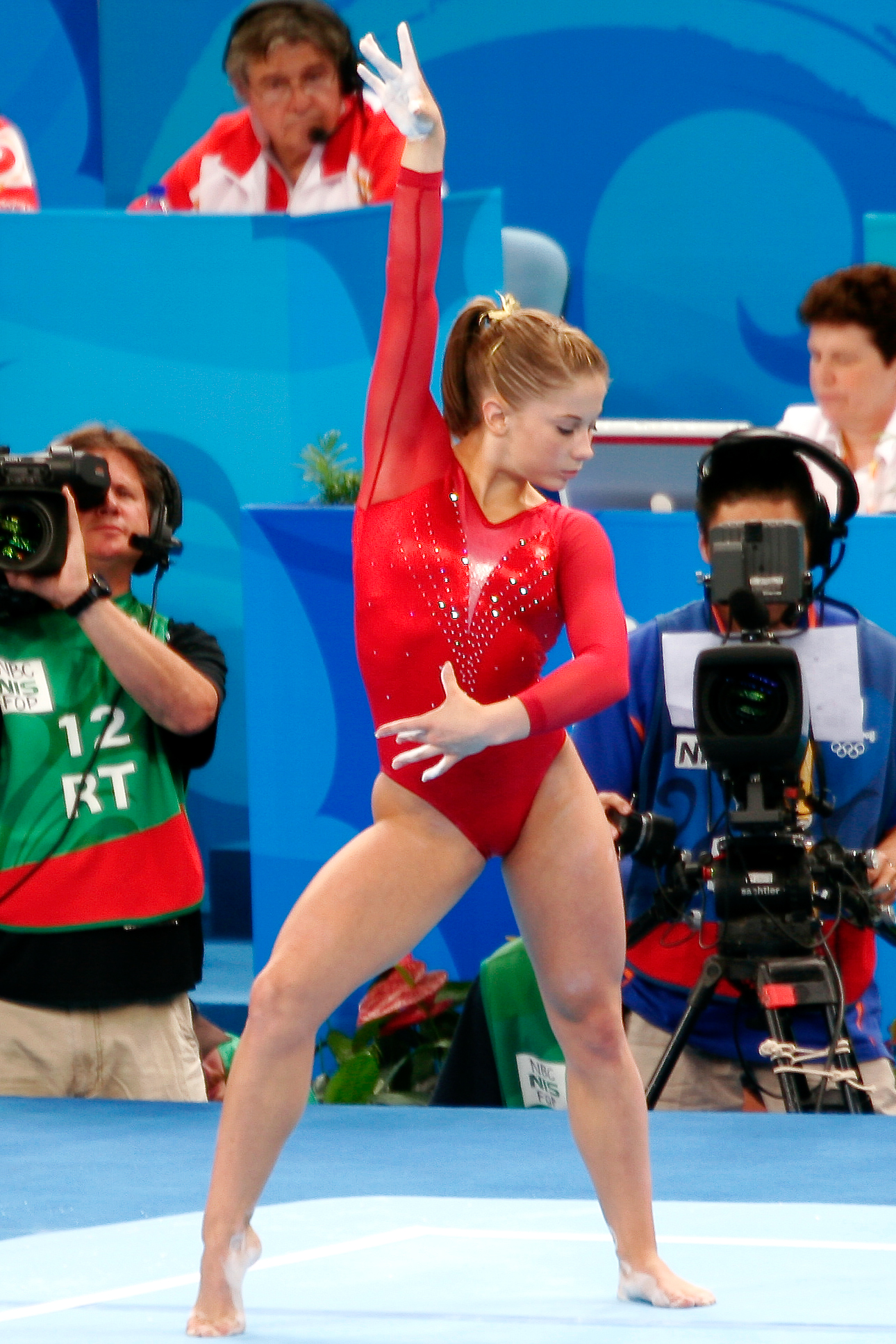
Olympic gold-medalist, Shawn Johnson, won the award in 2008.

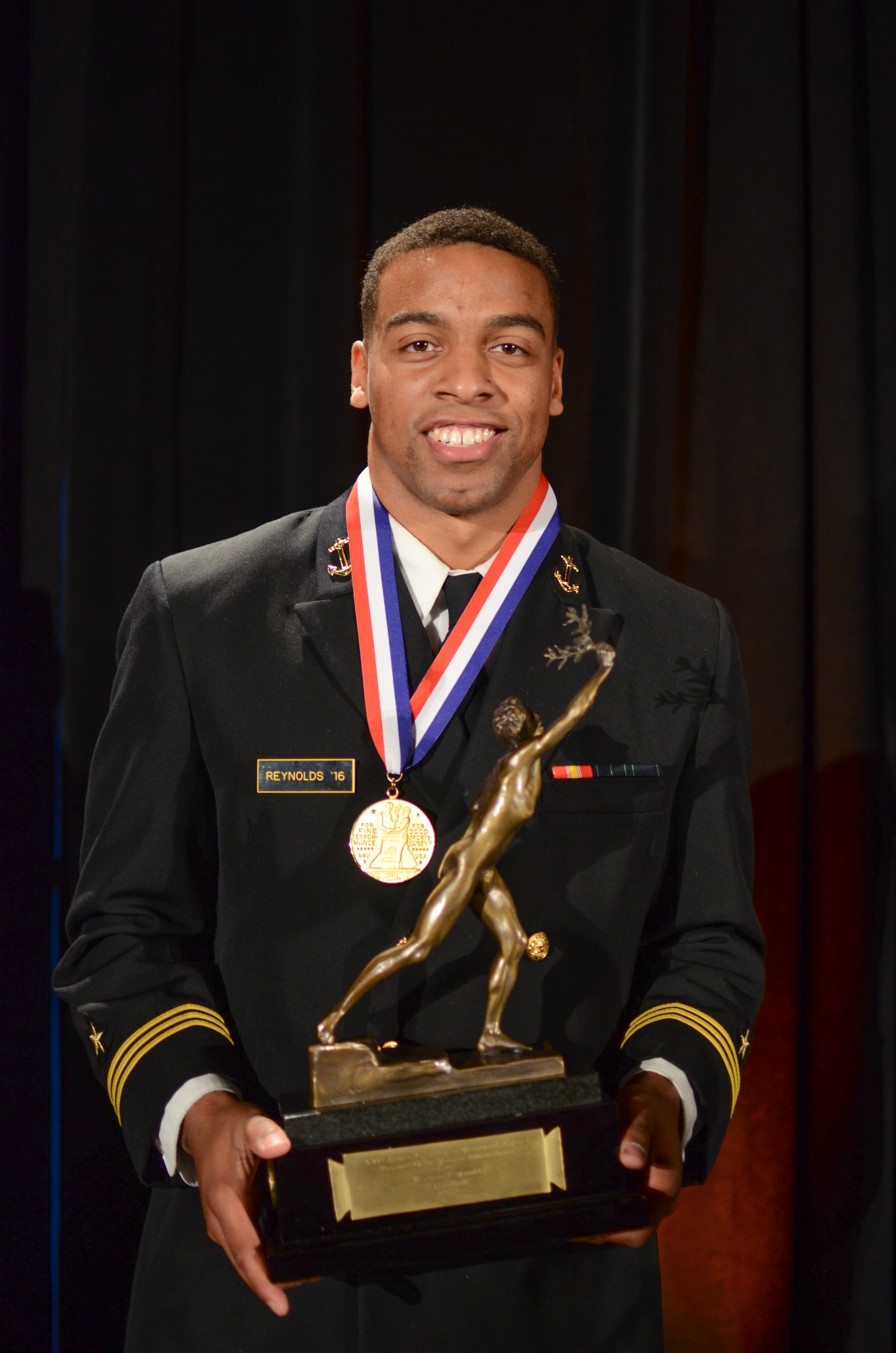
Quarterback Keenan Reynolds was awarded the 86th AAU James E. Sullivan Award.

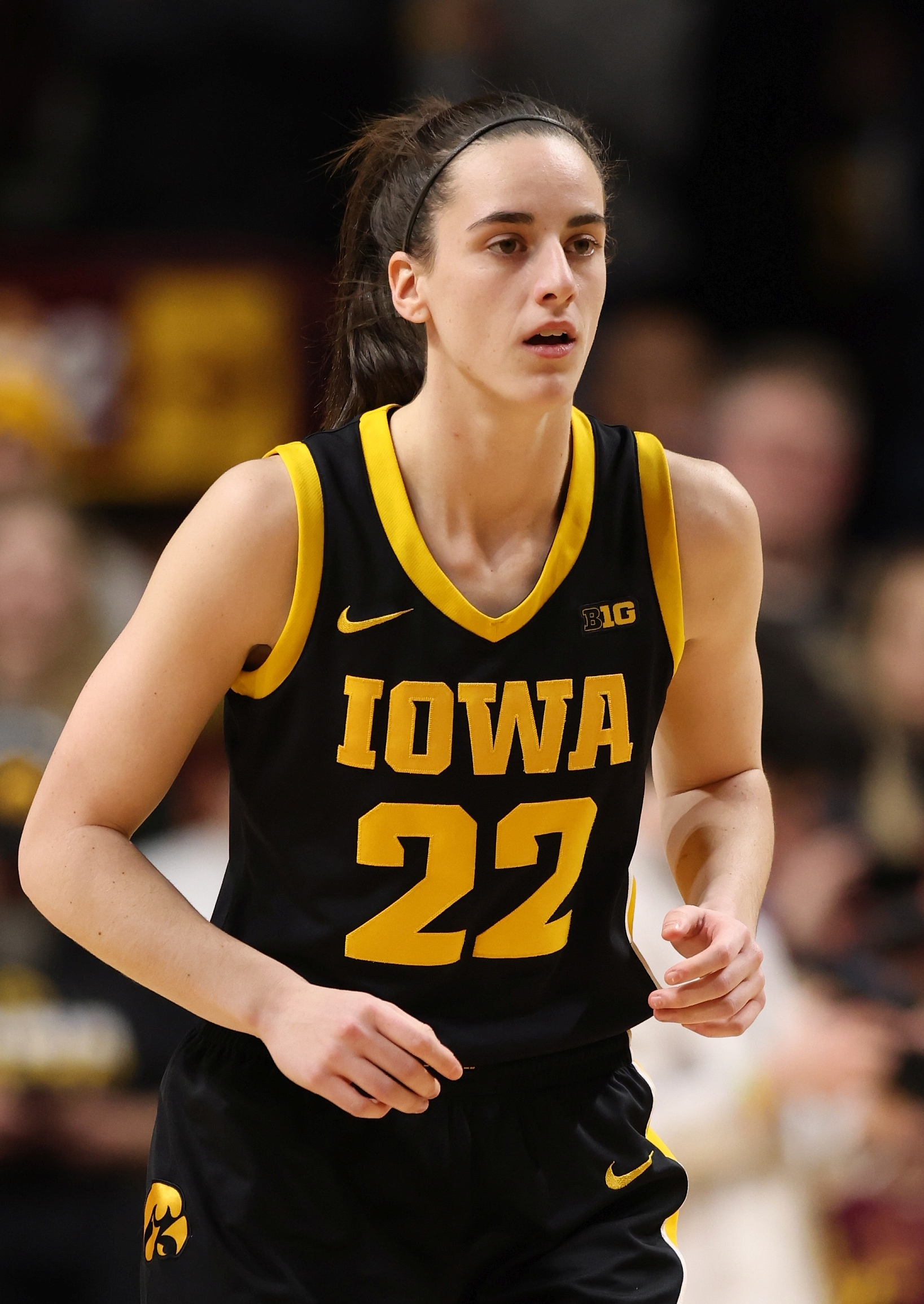
Caitlin Clark won the award in 2022 and 2023, the first ever 2× winner.

== Winners ==
Award Year	Winner	Sport(s)	Reference
1930	Bobby Jones	Golf	
1931	Bernard Berlinger	Decathlon	
1932	James Bausch	Decathlon	
1933	Glenn Cunningham	Running (middle distance)	
1934	William Bonthron	Running (middle distance)	
1935	W. Lawson Little, Jr.	Golf	
1936	Glenn Morris	Decathlon	
1937	Don Budge	Tennis	
1938	Don Lash	Running (long distance)	
1939	Joe Burk	Rowing	
1940	J. Gregory Rice	Running (long distance)	
1941	T. Leslie MacMitchell	Running (middle distance/cross country)	
1942	Cornelius Warmerdam	Pole vault	
1943	Gil Dodds	Running (middle distance)	
1944	Ann Curtis	Swimming	
1945	Doc Blanchard	Football	
1946	Arnold Tucker	Football	
1947	John B. Kelly, Jr.	Rowing	
1948	Bob Mathias	Decathlon	
1949	Dick Button	Figure skating	
1950	Fred Wilt	Running (long distance)	
1951	Bob Richards	Pole vault & decathlon	
1952	Horace Ashenfelter	Running (long distance)	
1953	Sammy Lee	Diving	
1954	Mal Whitfield	Running (middle distance)	
1955	Harrison Dillard	Running (sprint)	
1956	Pat McCormick	Diving	
1957	Bobby Morrow	Running (sprint)	
1958	Glenn Davis	Running (sprint)	
1959	Parry O'Brien	Shot put & discus	
1960	Rafer Johnson	Decathlon	
1961	Wilma Rudolph	Running (sprint)	
1962	Jim Beatty	Running (middle and long distance)	
1963	John Pennel	Pole vault	
1964	Don Schollander	Swimming	
1965	Bill Bradley	Basketball	
1966	Jim Ryun	Running (middle distance)	
1967	Randy Matson	Shot put & discus	
1968	Debbie Meyer	Swimming	
1969	Bill Toomey	Decathlon	
1970	John Kinsella	Swimming	
1971	Mark Spitz	Swimming	
1972	Frank Shorter	Running (long distance)	
1973	Bill Walton	Basketball	
1974	Rick Wohlhuter	Running (middle distance)	
1975	Tim Shaw	Swimming	
1976	Caitlyn Jenner (Note: Jenner changed her name from Bruce to Caitlyn after to her gender transition in 2015.)	Decathlon	
1977	John Naber	Swimming	
1978	Tracy Caulkins	Swimming	
1979	Kurt Thomas	Gymnastics	
1980	Eric Heiden	Speed skating	
1981	Carl Lewis	Running (sprint) & long jump	
1982	Mary Decker	Running (middle and long distance)	
1983	Edwin Moses	Running (sprint)	
1984	Greg Louganis	Diving	
1985	Joan Benoit	Running (long distance)	
1986	Jackie Joyner-Kersee	Running (sprint)	
1987	Jim Abbott	Baseball	
1988	Florence Griffith-Joyner	Running (sprint)	
1989	Janet Evans	Swimming	
1990	John Smith	Wrestling	
1991	Mike Powell	Long jump	
1992	Bonnie Blair	Speed skating	
1993	Charlie Ward	Basketball & football	
1994	Dan Jansen	Speed skating	
1995	Bruce Baumgartner	Wrestling	
1996	Michael Johnson	Running (sprint)	
1997	Peyton Manning	Football	
1998	Chamique Holdsclaw	Basketball	
1999	Coco Miller	Basketball	
1999	Kelly Miller	Basketball	
2000	Rulon Gardner	Wrestling	
2001	Michelle Kwan	Figure skating	
2002	Sarah Hughes	Figure skating	
2003	Michael Phelps	Swimming	
2004	Paul Hamm	Gymnastics	
2005	JJ Redick	Basketball	
2006	Jessica Long	Swimming	
2007	Tim Tebow	Football	
2008	Shawn Johnson	Gymnastics	
2009	Amy Palmiero-Winters	Running (ultra marathon)	
2010	Evan Lysacek	Figure skating	
2011	Andrew Rodriguez	Football	
2012	Missy Franklin	Swimming	
2013	John Urschel	Football	
2014	Ezekiel Elliott	Football	
2015	Keenan Reynolds	Football	
2015	Breanna Stewart	Basketball	
2016	Lauren Carlini	Volleyball	
2017	Kyle Snyder	Wrestling	
2018	Kathryn Plummer	Volleyball	
2019	Sabrina Ionescu	Basketball	
2019	Spencer Lee	Wrestling	
2020	Simone Biles	Gymnastics	
2020	Caeleb Dressel	Swimming	
2021	Carissa Moore	Surfing	
2022	Caitlin Clark	Basketball	
2023	Caitlin Clark	Basketball	
2024	Lexi Rodriguez	Volleyball	
2025	Tatyana McFadden	Wheelchair track and field	
