= Utah Grand Slam =

The Utah Grand Slam is an annual competition held throughout the state of Utah in which participants run a series of four marathons throughout the calendar year. The man and woman with the lowest net time for all four races is declared the winner. There are additional prizes for winners within each age group. The series consists of five marathons: four primary races and one alternate if a runner cannot participate in a primary race. The Utah Grand Slam has been administered and managed by the Wasatch Running Center in Sandy, Utah since 2004.

== Eligible race list ==
- Ogden Marathon
- Utah Valley Marathon
- Park City Marathon
- Top of Utah Marathon (Alternate Marathon)
- St. George Marathon

== Winners ==
Year	Men's Winner	Net Time	Women's Winner	Net Time
2009	Ryan Oldroyd	11:47:02	Amber Green	12:48:39
