= Utah Valley Marathon =

Annual marathon foot-race in Northern Utah

- Date: Usually the first Saturday of June
- Location: Utah Valley
- Event type: Road
- Distance: Marathon, half marathon, 10K, 5K, 1K kids race
- Beneficiary: Kids on the Move, Stella H. Oaks Foundation, Meals on Wheels
- Established: April 12, 2008; 18 years ago
- Last held: 2026
- Course records: Marathon Men: 2:15:52 (2025); Melese Kifle; Marathon Women: 2:33:46 (2026); Grace Clements
- Website: http://www.utahvalleymarathon.com/
- Participants: 1,521 marathon - 2026 (2,000 limit); 5,219 all races - 2026

The Utah Valley Marathon (UVM) is an annual marathon foot-race in Northern Utah held on the first Saturday of June. The marathon course is USA Track & Field (USATF) certified and is a Boston Marathon qualifier.

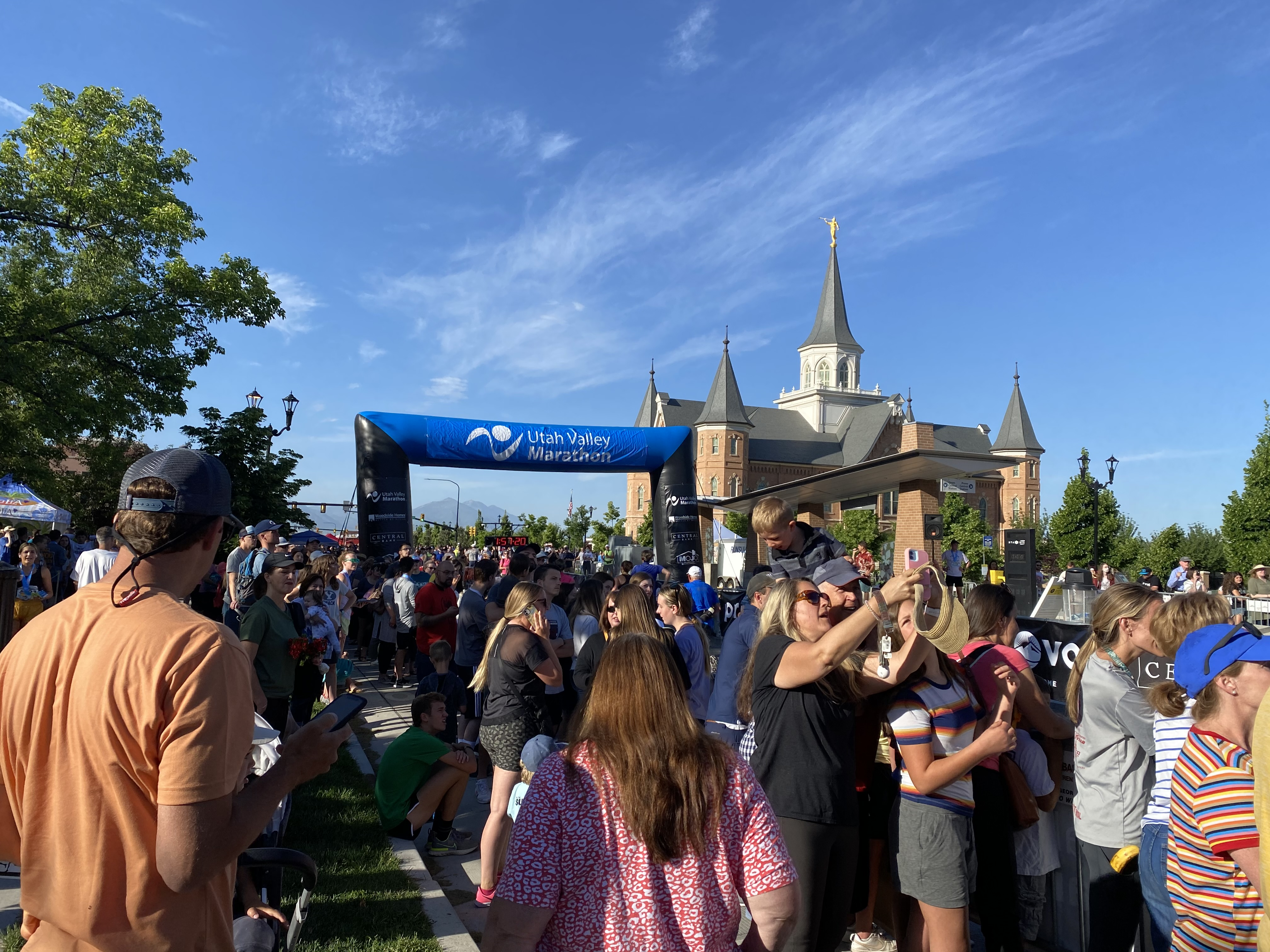
Photo of the marathon finish line at University Avenue in Provo, Utah on Saturday, June 5, 2021.

== History ==
The race was started in 2008 by Hyrum Oaks and Jeremiah West. The inaugural marathon was held on April 12, 2008. Between 2009 and 2018, the race was moved to the second Saturday in June. Beginning in 2019, the race will be held on the first Saturday in June to avoid conflicts with local festivals. In 2008, there were 120 marathon runners. Since 2009, the marathon has been part of the Utah Grand Slam.

The race is put on largely by volunteers. CharityVision (formerly Deseret International), Mentor's International, Mac's Gift (formerly the Children with Cancer Christmas Foundation), and Road to Success are the four primary charities. The Children with Cancer Christmas foundation has been part of the race since its inception in 2008. In 2010, CharityVision (formerly Deseret International) was added as a second charitable recipient. In 2013, Mentor's International and the Road to Success charities were added.

Between 2008 and 2011, the event included a 5K. In 2012, the 5K distance was removed in favor of a 10K race. In 2010, a half-marathon race was added. In 2009, twenty-five members of the Pleasant Grove Fire Department ran the marathon as part of their annual physical fitness test. The same year, the UVM was the first local race to allow footbikes.

== Race courses ==
=== Marathon course ===
The 26 mile 385 yard course runs through Wasatch and Utah Counties. The marathon begins at 6:00 AM (MDT). The Utah Valley Marathon typically has a cap of 2,000 marathon runners. The race begins in Wallsburg, UT at an elevation of 5,963 feet (1,818 m) and heads northwest through Wallsburg along Highway 222. At the intersection of U.S. Route 189, the course turns west and follows the Deer Creek Reservoir until U.S. Route 189 reaches Provo Canyon. U.S. Route 189 is also known as the Provo Canyon Scenic Byway. The race continues southwest through Provo Canyon along the Provo River until the road merges with University Avenue (U.S. Route 189) in Orem. The race continues south along University Avenue through Orem and Provo until the finish line at the intersection of University Avenue and Center Street at an elevation of 4,504 feet (1,373 m)

2010 was the first year that a non-Utah resident won either the men or women's marathon race. Prior to Hillary Kibet Cheruiyot (Of Kenya) winning the men's 2010 race, and Claudia Camargo-Nero (a New York resident from Argentina) winning the women's 2010 race, only United States born, Utah residents had won the marathon race for either gender.

2013 marked a change in the marathon course. For the first time, runners ran against traffic. Barrel cones closed off the traffic lane to oncoming automobiles providing runners with a corridor within which to run. This change in traffic also allowed traffic to flow more smoothly at the Highway 222 and U.S. Route 189 intersection as runners do not need to cross across traffic, thus allowing traffic to flow continuously.

=== Half marathon course ===
The 21.0975-kilometre (13.1094 mi) course begins in Provo Canyon at the midpoint of the full marathon course. The starting line is just south of the Highway 92 and U.S. Route 189 intersection. The course follows the marathon course down through the canyon and along University Avenue until the finish line at the Provo Towne Centre mall.

In 2010, USA residents Seth Pilkington and Lindsey Dunkley won the men's and women's respective half-marathon titles. In 2011, Brad Osguthorpe won the men's half-marathon title and Andrea North won the women's half-marathon title. In 2012, Kyle Perry won the men's half-marathon title. Kassi Harmon won the women's half-marathon title. In 2013, Joshua McCabe won the men's title and Kassi Harmon repeated as the women's half-marathon title winner. The Utah Valley Half-Marathon typically has a cap of 2,500 runners. The half-marathon begins at 6:00 AM (MDT).

=== 10K Course ===
Beginning in 2012, the race added a 10-kilometre (6.2 mi) event. This distance starts in the neighborhoods just south of the mouth of Provo Canyon near Canyon Crest Elementary school in Provo, and ends at the common finish area in downtown Provo at University Avenue and Center Street. The Utah Valley Marathon 10K typically has a cap of 2,000 runners.

=== 5K Course ===
The 5K was included as one of the race distances in 2008, but was discontinued in 2012. However, the 5K is now offered as a race again.

=== 1K Course (kids race) ===
In 2012, the race added a 1-kilometre (0.62 mi) kids race. This race is for children 12 years of age and under. The race is free for all participants. The race ends at the same finish line as the full marathon, half-marathon, and 10K. The Utah Valley Marathon Free Kids' 1K typically has a cap of 2,000 children, ages 12 or under.

== List of winners ==
=== Key ===
Current course record
Former course record

=== Marathon distance ===
Year	Men's Winner	Time	Country	Women's Winner	Time	Country
2008	Steven Ashbaker	2:37:08.60	United States	Josse Tobiasson	3:15:40.40	United States
2009	Seth Wold	2:26:22.90	United States	Mary Ann Schauerhamer	3:00:41.60	United States
2010	Hillary Kibet Cheruiyot	2:21:28.9	Kenya	Claudia Camargo-Nero	2:46:21.9	Argentina
2011	Hillary Kibet Cheruiyot	2:19:18	Kenya	Kassi Harmon	2:49:19	United States
2012	Peter Kemboi	2:28:56	Kenya	Emily Bates	2:56:49	United States
2013	Bryant Jensen	2:20:27	United States	Amber Green	2:51:43	United States
2014	Ezekiel Kiplagat	2:25:36.6	Kenya	Danya Crawford	2:51:21.5	United States
2015	David Tuwei	2:30:10.0	United States	Natalie Callister	2:48:52.2	United States
2016	Stanley Boen	2:23:41	United States	Amber Green	2:50:37	United States
2017	Bryant Jensen	2:20:20	United States	Ramona Sanchez	2:46:47	United States
2018	Nicholas Arciniaga	2:21:26	United States	Kayla Brown	2:51:31	United States
2019	Jonathan Kotter	2:21:04	United States	Ashley Paulson	2:47:37	United States
2020*	Adam Hendrickson	2:31:05	United States	Jackie Hendrickson	2:47:48	United States
2021	Bashash Walio	2:18:19	United States	Obsie Birru	2:37:35	United States
2022	Fikadu Tegene	2:24:00	Ethiopia	Lindsay Tollefson	2:51:28	United States
2023	Fikadu Tegene	2:21:28	Ethiopia	Kassi Harmon	2:41:48	United States
2024	Fikadu Tegene	2:18:57	Ethiopia	Grace Clements	2:41:55	United States
2025	Melese Kifle	2:15:52	Ethiopia	Lindsay Tollefson	2:46:20	United States
2026	Fikadu Tegene	2:21:06	Ethiopia	Grace Clements	2:33:46	United States

*Virtual marathon only in 2020.

=== Half marathon distance ===
Year	Men's Winner	Time	Country	Women's Winner	Time	Country
2010	Seth Pilkington	1:06:05.8	United States	Lindsey Dunkley	1:13:33.0	United States
2011	Brad Osguthorpe	1:05:03	United States	Andrea North	1:17:54	United States
2012	Kyle Perry	1:06:43	United States	Kassi Harmon	1:21:16	United States
2013	Joshua McCabe	1:06:53	United States	Kassi Harmon	1:18:44	United States
2014	Tylor Thatcher	1:05:45.8	United States	Natalie Como	1:19:54.2	United States
2015	Brett Hales	1:05:45.2	United States	Natalie Como	1:18:38.0	United States
2016	Brett Hales	1:05:45	United States	Sariah Long	1:19:35	United States
2017	Nicolas Montanez	1:04:29	United States	Samantha Diaz	1:17:00	United States
2018	Nathan Peters	1:07:04	United States	Joy Miller	1:18:50	United States
2019	Travis Morrison	1:04:16	United States	Emily Barrett	1:18:44	United States
2020*	Jeff Callister	1:15:15	United States	Reanna Jereb	1:20:58	United States
2021	Sean O'Connor	1:05:08	United States	Alycia Hill	1:16:26	United States
2022	Habtamu Cheney	1:05:08	United States	Amanda Moore	1:21:19	United States
2023	Habtamu Cheney	1:02:57	United States	Savannah Berry	1:11:40	United States
2024	Michael Ottesen	1:03:49	United States	Hannah Branch	1:12:42	United States
2025	Noah Jenkins	1:04:05	United States	Elizabeth Chikotas	1:12:22	United States
2026	Dalton Mortensen	1:03:49	United States	Sylvia Bedford	1:18:35	United States

*Virtual marathon only in 2020.

== Number of finishers ==
Year	5K	10K	Half-Marathon	Full Marathon	TOTAL
2008	102	---	---	102	204
2009	356	---	---	595	951
2010	622	---	783	1,445	2,850
2011	365	---	1,948	1,656	3,969
2012	---	432	2,511	2,044	4,987
2013	---	358	1,972	1,471	3,801
2014	---	316	1,513	1,426	3,255
2015	---	419	1,660	1,145	3,224
2016	---	371	1,276	955	2,602
2017	---	879	1,943	1,176	3,998
2018	---	403	1,177	889	2,469
2019	---	534	1,187	880	2,601
2020*	---	123	277	248	648
2021 (Virtual)	455 (17)	982 (10)	2,092 (21)	1,351 (13)	4,880 (61)
2022 (Virtual)	322 (5)	533 (1)	1,541 (2)	921 (1)	3,317 (9)
2023 (Virtual)	384 (1)	581 (3)	1,765 (2)	995 (0)	3,725 (6)
2024	381	648	2,124	1,212	4,365
2025	347	630	2,277	1,314	4,568
2026	471	725	2,502	1,521	5,219

*Virtual race only in 2020, virtual race results in subsequent years in parentheses.
