= Dick Buerkle =

American distance runner (1947–2020)

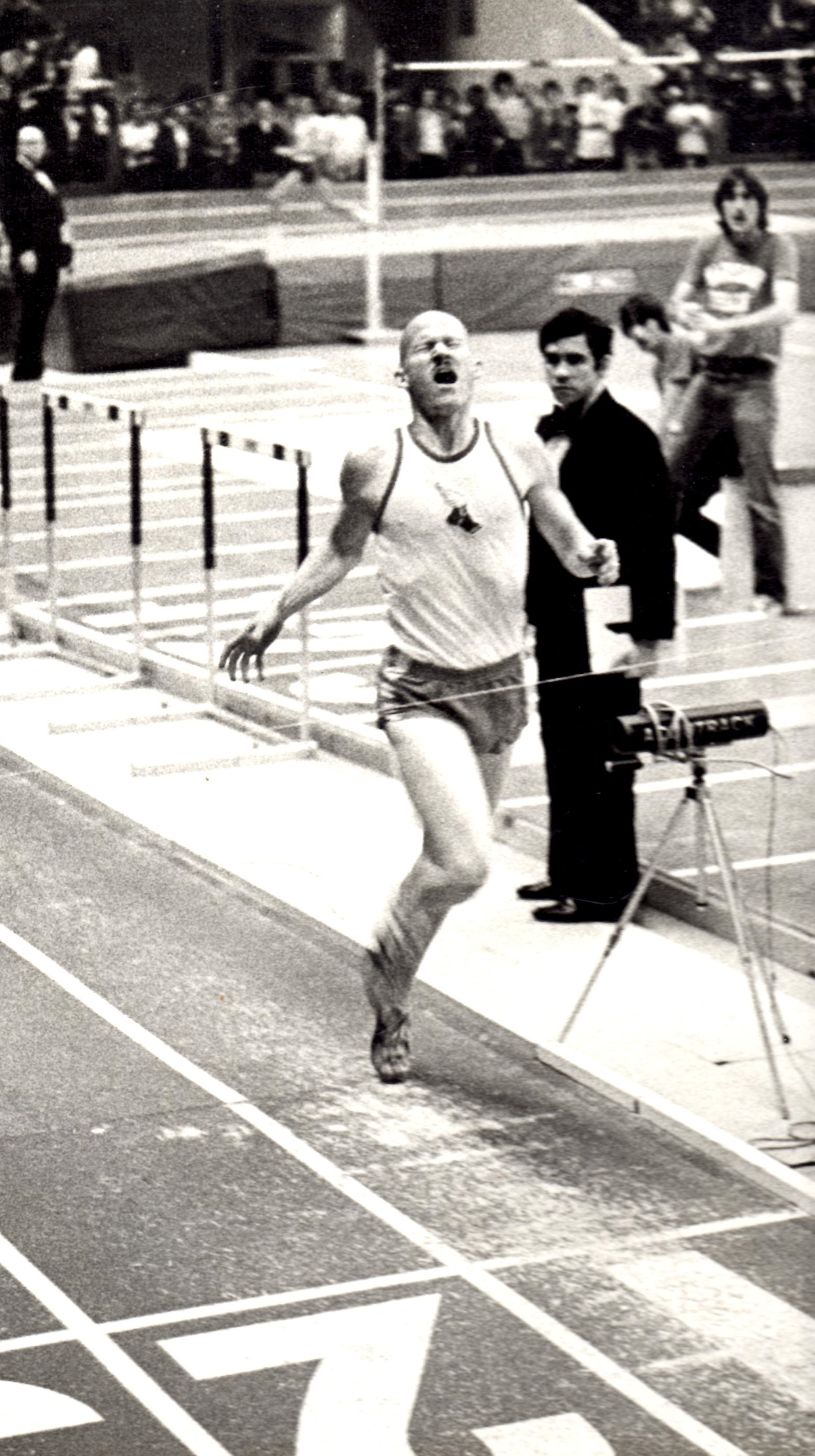
- Buerkle setting world record for indoor mile (3:54.9) on January 13, 1978

Personal information
- Nationality: American
- Born: September 3, 1947 Rochester, New York, U.S.
- Died: June 22, 2020 (aged 72) Atlanta, Georgia, U.S.
- Height: 5 ft 7 in (170 cm) (1978)
- Weight: 130 lb (59 kg) (1978)

Sport
- Sport: Track
- Events: 1500 meters, mile
- College team: Villanova
- Club: NYAC
- Coached by: Jumbo Elliott

Achievements and titles
- Personal bests: Mile: 3:54.93i^{1} 3000m: 7:53.2; 2-mile: 8:21.76; 5000m: 13:23.20; 10,000m: 28:25.0
- Updated on September 26, 2015

Richard Thomas Buerkle (/ˈbɜːrkliː/ BERK-lee; September 3, 1947 – June 22, 2020) was an American Olympic athlete and a world record holder for the men's indoor mile. He is known as one of the most successful walk-ons in the history of American collegiate running as a result of his athletic successes while at Villanova.

== Running career ==
=== High school ===
Buerkle graduated from Aquinas Institute high school in 1965 with personal best times of 4:28 for the mile and 10:01 for two miles. He began running competitively only in his senior year of high school.

=== Collegiate ===
With no stand-out track credentials from high school, Buerkle enrolled at Villanova initially with no sports scholarship. At Villanova, he learned under the tutelage of head coach Jumbo Elliott and assistant coach Jim Tuppeny. He finally received a track scholarship in April of his junior year, after breaking the nine-minute barrier in the two-mile race, recording 8:57 at a dual meet in Knoxville. Two weeks later, Buerkle lowered Villanova's two-mile record to 8:46.2. He graduated from Villanova in 1970 with a degree in Spanish studies.

=== Post-collegiate ===
After graduating from Villanova, Buerkle began working for a distributor of contact lenses in Buffalo, New York, although Buerkle said that the company welcomed his running goals. Buerkle qualified for the 1976 and 1980 Olympics. The 1976 Games in Montreal were a disappointment for Buerkle; in the 5000 meters, he was ninth in what was, at that point, the fastest 5000 m heat in history and did not qualify for the final. The U.S. team did not compete in 1980 because of the boycott enacted by President Jimmy Carter.

On January 13, 1978, at the CYO Invitational held at the Cole Field House, he broke the indoor mile world record with a time of 3:54.93, finishing ahead of Filbert Bayi and Paul Cummings. He allegedly ate nine oreos and two peanut butter jelly sandwiches only a few hours before the race. He then won the men's Wanamaker Mile at the Millrose Games in 3:58.4, beating Wilson Waigwa and Bayi for a second consecutive race on Madison Square Garden's track. The Wanamaker victory put his image on the covers of Sports Illustrated and Track & Field News.

== Personal life ==
Years before the look became popular, Buerkle's most noticeable physical characteristic was his bald head which was the result of alopecia areata by age 12. The taunts he heard at track meets helped fuel his determination to succeed. He was later most thankful to Michael Jordan for shaving his head and ushering the style into the mainstream.

At the time of Steve Prefontaine's death in 1975, Buerkle was his chief American rival; he composed a tribute poem that was printed in the Eugene's Register-Guard the following day.

Buerkle eventually grew tired of the winter weather in his native Rochester, New York, and relocated his family to Atlanta, Georgia, soon thereafter. Buerkle continued to live and work in the Atlanta area after retiring from world-class competition in 1981. Buerkle said that the decision was not difficult. By that point, he and his wife, Jean, whom he met at Villanova, had a son, Gabriel, and two daughters, Lily and Tera.

Buerkle tried careers in sales and teaching in tandem with his running career. In 1992, he began teaching Spanish at Dunwoody High School, where he also coached track and field and cross-country running. He finished his career at Henderson Middle School as a Spanish instructor while simultaneously training the boys' track team thus resulting in back to back county championships in 2011–2012. Buerkle retired in January 2014. He died on June 22, 2020, from multiple system atrophy.

== See also ==
- Four-minute mile
- World record progression for the mile run

== Notes ==
^1 The "i" after a result indicates an indoor performance.
