= Ray Conger =

American middle-distance runner

Raymond Milton Conger (November 12, 1904 – October 23, 1994) was an American middle-distance runner. He held the world record for the 1,000 yards and the American record for the 1,500 metres. In the U.S. national championships, Conger was a three-time winner in both the 1,000 yd and the mile run. At the 1928 Summer Olympics in Amsterdam, he won his qualifying heat for the 1,500 m but did not finish in the final.

In 1929, Conger became the first and only athlete to defeat Paavo Nurmi in the mile, beating the "Flying Finn" to the win in the indoor Wanamaker Mile of the Millrose Games. Although Conger was modest about his win, he would be known as "the man who beat Nurmi" for decades. Conger also scored wins over Otto Peltzer and Edvin Wide, and went on to be undefeated in the mile for two seasons. He retired from running in 1932.

Conger ran track for Iowa State University in college, later obtained a master's degree in physiology, and then did further graduate work at Columbia University. From 1931 to 1936 he taught zoology at Carleton College in Northfield, Minnesota, where he also coached track. He then joined the faculty at the Pennsylvania State University and was a long-time professor of professor of physical education preceding his retirement in 1970. In 1963, he was inducted into the Iowa Sports Hall of Fame. He was born and raised in Riceville, Iowa.

== See also ==
- List of Pennsylvania State University Olympians
- Riceville, Iowa
