= Leslie MacMitchell =

American middle-distance runner

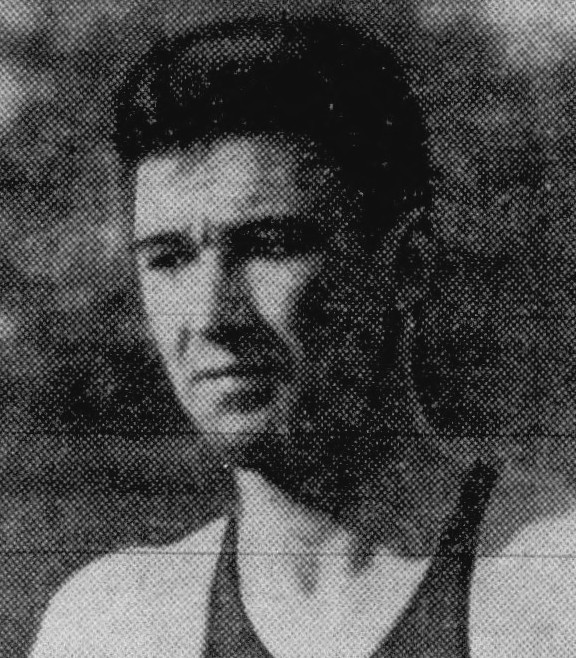
MacMitchell, circa 1942

Thomas Leslie MacMitchell (September 26, 1920 – March 21, 2006) was an American athlete who competed in several events in the late 1930s and 1940s, including the mile run. He won numerous races while attending New York University (NYU) and earned the James E. Sullivan Award, the top U.S. award for amateur athletes, in 1941. That year, he also gained a share of the world record for an indoor mile run. After serving in World War II, MacMitchell had some success, but his performance declined, and he never went to an Olympic Games.

== Early life ==
Born in New York City, MacMitchell suffered from diphtheria when he was seven years old; the illness forced him to be confined to a bed for four months, and to re-learn how to walk afterward. MacMitchell later went to Manhattan's George Washington High School, where he displayed his track abilities with high school national championships in two events: the 1,000-yard run and cross country.

== Pre-World War II career ==
In 1939 and 1940, MacMitchell won the IC4A cross country championship. By the early 1940s, MacMitchell had gained a reputation as a leading American runner, particularly in the mile. One writer predicted that MacMitchell would be the first man to accomplish a four-minute mile, and that he would later "be hailed as the greatest runner of all time". At the 1941 Baxter Mile, he ran the mile in 4:07.4 seconds, tying the world indoor record held by Glenn Cunningham and Chuck Fenske. In the meets held at Madison Square Garden that year, MacMitchell was undefeated in the mile in five races. In 1941, he also won the National Collegiate Athletic Association (NCAA) outdoor mile national championship, along with outdoor and indoor IC4A victories. MacMitchell was the Amateur Athletic Union's (AAU) champion of the 1500 meters, and won every cross country event he entered, the fourth consecutive year he did so. He won his third consecutive Intercollegiate cross country title, on top of a 1938 victory in the championship for freshmen. In December 1941, MacMitchell was announced to be the leading vote-getter for the James E. Sullivan Award; this made him the first winner of the award not to have graduated from college, as he was in his senior year at NYU at the time. He was the youngest recipient of the Sullivan Award at the time, and was the first winner from New York state.

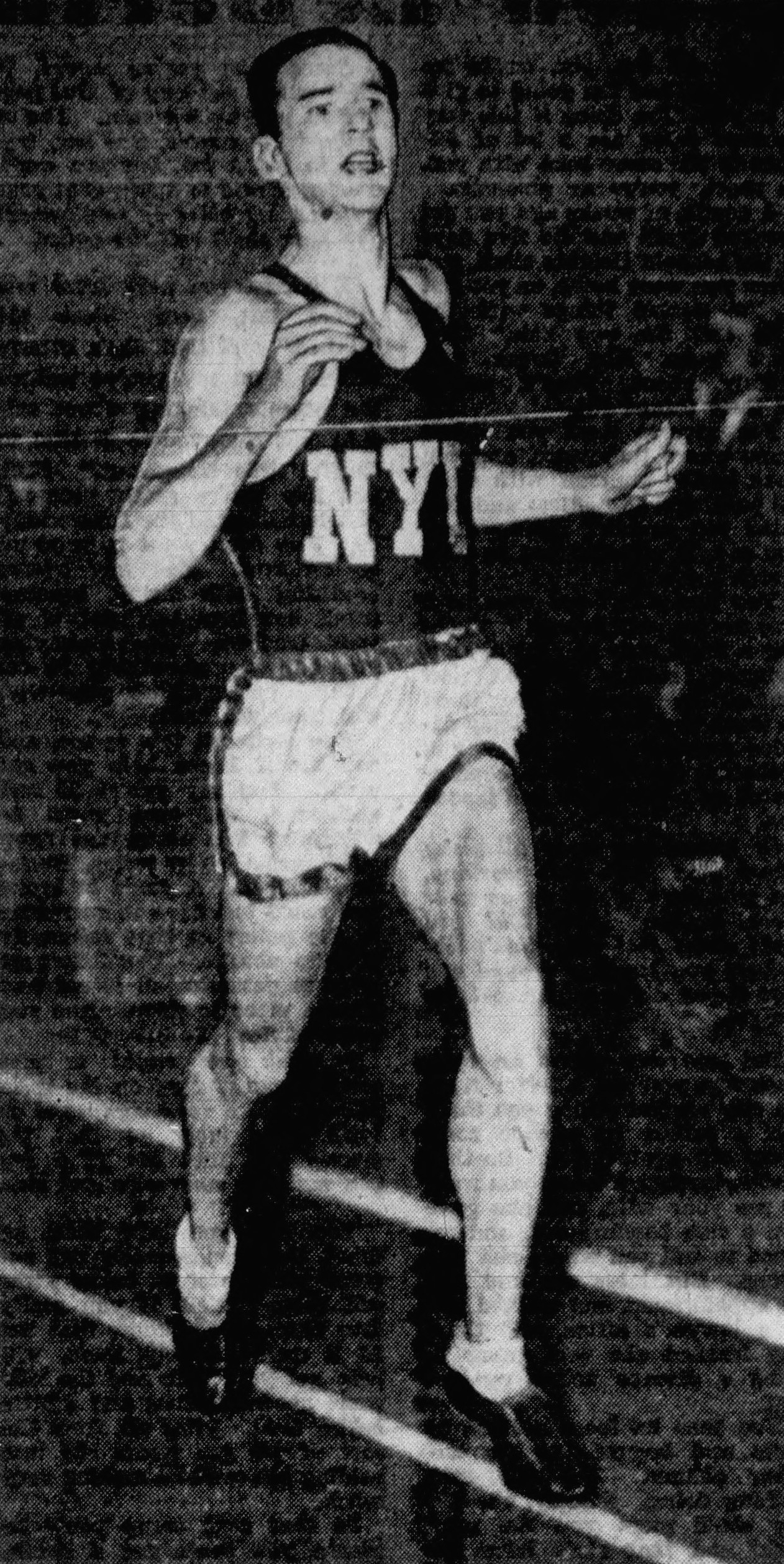
MacMitchell during his senior season at New York University, circa 1942.

In 1942, MacMitchell won the Millrose Games' Wanamaker Mile, posting a 4:11.3 time. He built a streak of mile race wins that reached 19 in 1942, before Gil Dodds defeated him at the AAU national championship. He also finished in second place at the NCAA Championships, behind Bobby Ginn. That month, he graduated from NYU with a physical education degree. His career was then interrupted by World War II. MacMitchell served in the U.S. Navy as a lieutenant.

== Post-war career ==
After the Navy discharged MacMitchell, he returned to competition in January 1946. Following third- and first-place finishes, respectively, in the Metropolitan AAU (indoor) and Grover Cleveland events, he made a successful comeback to the mile run, winning an event sponsored by The Philadelphia Inquirer in a time of 4:14.1. In February, he recorded a victory in the AAU national championship. MacMitchell had eight straight indoor victories in the mile, a streak ended with a second-place finish at the Chicago Relays, in which he fell during lap nine. Despite his wins, MacMitchell remained unsatisfied with his performance; he later attributed this to his military service, saying "Running on the steel deck of a light cruiser is not the best way to train." He later attempted to qualify for the 1948 Summer Olympics, but was unsuccessful; he retired from competition afterward.

== Later life ==
Before the end of his athletics career, NYU gave MacMitchell a job in administration. In future years, he worked in multiple positions related to education, including a three-decade stint with the College Board. Another of MacMitchell's post-athletics jobs was with Brooklyn Dodgers president Walter O'Malley, who hired him as an assistant. He continued working until 2001. In his personal life, MacMitchell was married twice, first to Mary Lee and then Jill Kudlich after divorcing Lee. He had four children and three grandchildren. In 2005, MacMitchell died in San Jose, California, after coming down with pneumonia.
