= St. George Marathon =

Annual marathon in Utah, U.S.

- St. George Marathon
- Date: Usually the first Saturday of October
- Location: St. George, Utah
- Event type: Road
- Distance: Marathon - 26.219 miles (42.195 km)
- Primary sponsor: Intermountain Health
- Established: 1977; 49 years ago
- Last held: 2026
- Organizer: The city of St. George
- Course records: Men: 2:13:56 (2025); Jake Heslington; Women: 2:28:41 (2025); Kodi Kleven
- Website: https://www.stgeorgemarathon.com/
- Participants: 4,376 marathon - 2025 (5,500 limit); 7,895 all races - 2025

The St. George Marathon is an annual marathon sporting event hosted by the city of St. George, Utah on the first Saturday in October. The first race run was in November 1977. It was originated and organized in just a few months by Sherm Miller, who worked for the Parks and Recreation Department of St. George City. It is currently the 16th largest marathon in the United States of America.

== Race ==
The St. George Marathon accommodates up to 5,500 runners in the marathon, 2,500 runners in the half marathon and 600 5K runners. All runners, male and female, from any nation, may submit registrations to run, but registration closes when caps are reached or on August 31. Runners must have reached the corner of Snow Canyon Parkway and Utah State Route 18 (Bluff Street), a distance of 23.1 miles, within 6 hours and 15 minutes of the race start time.

The race begins at 7:00 AM for wheelchair participants and runners. The course starts in the scenic Pine Valley Mountains at an altitude of 5,240 feet (1,600 m), and descends nearly 2,600 feet (790 m) through varied scenery, including the formations of spectacular white, pink, and red sandstone and black basalt in Snow Canyon State Park. The race finishes in Vernon Worthen Park in St. George City at an altitude of 2,680 feet (820 m). Morning temperatures usually range from 38 to 44 °F (3 to 7 °C), while temperatures at the finish typically range from 65 to 85 °F (18 to 29 °C).

== History ==
The St. George Marathon began in November 1977, inspired by Sherm Miller, a St. George City Parks and Recreation Department employee who had run the Deseret News Marathon in Salt Lake City. Miller organized the inaugural race with the crucial support of Bob Horlacher, a teacher and coach at Dixie College, and his wife, Roma. The first race saw 57 runners and one wheelchair racer brave a cold day and strong headwind. Near mile 20, a runner narrowly avoided a hay truck. The course, later found to be 40 yards short, saw only 38 of the 58 starters finish. By 1978, word-of-mouth promotion increased participation to 378 runners, drawn by the scenic Southwestern Utah landscape, including red and white sandstone formations in the Snow Canyon area. At that time, the race was not yet sanctioned, but it has since become a USA Track and Field Certified and Sanctioned event.

Bob Horlacher played a pivotal role in the marathon's early success. In 1976, when the marathon idea was proposed, Bob, a respected coach, wholeheartedly supported it. In 1977, while managing the St. George City pool with Roma, he recruited runners, including lifeguards, two of whom participated. One of the life guards, Debbie Zockoll, becoming an original Road of Fame inductee. Bob and Roma managed aid stations, timing, and transportation for the first race. Roma drove Bob and other runners to the starting line in Central, and their family manned mobile aid stations using card tables, navigating open roads where runners dodged traffic. Roma also served as the official timekeeper. Bob ran the race himself, later achieving a personal record of 3:04 and qualifying for the Boston Marathon in 1983 at age 52, which he ran with Sherm Miller. Bob's involvement extended beyond 1977, as he continued supporting the marathon, teaching running classes at Dixie College, writing fitness articles for the St. George Spectrum, and assisting struggling runners at the finish line with first aid. His dedication earned him a 2013 St. George Marathon Road of Fame induction. Bob died on October 19, 2012, and in 2013, 31 family members ran the marathon in his honor.

In 2006, the 30th anniversary of the St. George Marathon, the race was limited to 6,700 participants, with applicants selected by random lottery, except for residents of Washington County, Utah, and members of the St. George Marathon's 10-year and 20-year clubs who are officially entered into the race before the lottery. Starting with the 2017 race, the St. George Marathon omitted the lottery for registration. Also in 2006, the course was changed slightly in the last two miles for the run within the city, providing a route that is less congested with automobile traffic.

Debbie Zockoll, a first-grade teacher in the Washington County School District, was one of the 58 runners who competed in the first St. George Marathon in 1977. She became the first member of the 10-year club in 1987. She was also the first member of the 20-year club, and in 2006 she became the first member of the 30-year club. She became the first member of the 40-year club in 2016 and Zockoll would go on to run in the first 43 St. George Marathons before dying of cancer in March 2021.

Race times are used by many participants to qualify for the Boston Marathon. Runner's World magazine has included the St. George Marathon in the Runner's World 10 Most Scenic Marathons, Fastest Marathons and the Top 20 Marathons in the USA; calling it one of four "marathons to build a vacation around." Based on surveys of runners, Runner's World magazine named the St. George Marathon, the Most Organized Marathon. The race is known for tremendous volunteer support. The St. George Marathon was part of the Utah Grand Slam. The 2020 edition of the race was cancelled due to the coronavirus pandemic, with all registrants given the option of transferring their entry to 2021 or obtaining a full refund.

In October 2025, race organizers announced that they had increased the total prize money to $100,000 with the winners of the men's and women's marathon being awarded $10,000 each.

== List of recent winners ==
=== Men ===
Year	Winner	Country	Time	Notes
2021	Paul Kelly	United States	2:15:06	
2022	JJ Santana	United States	2:15:47	
2023	JJ Santana	United States	2:16:28	
2024	Michael Ottesen	United States	2:18:03	
2025	Jake Heslington	United States	2:13:56	Course record
2026	Eric Nelson	United States	2:15:23	

=== Women ===
Year	Winner	Country	Time	Notes
2021	Kodi Kleven	United States	2:32:44	
2022	Sylvia Bedford	United States	2:35:59	
2023	Sylvia Bedford	United States	2:36:53	
2024	Kodi Kleven	United States	2:30:43	
2025	Kodi Kleven	United States	2:28:41	Course record
2026	Morgan Nokes	United States	2:30:01	
