= Gerrish Newell =

American football player and coach

Biographical details
- Born: May 26, 1873
- Died: October 10, 1941 (aged 68); Arlington, New Jersey, U.S.

Playing career
- 1895: Harvard
- Position: End

Coaching career (HC unless noted)
- 1901: Trinity (CT)

Head coaching record
- Overall: 1–6–1

Gerrish Newell (May 26, 1873 – October 10, 1941) was an American college football player and coach, banker, and military officer. He served as the head football coach at Trinity College in Hartford, Connecticut for one season, in 1901, compiling a record of 1–6–1.

Newell grew up in Great Barrington, Massachusetts and was the younger brother of Marshall Newell, an All-American for the Harvard Crimson football team in the early 1890s. The younger Newell also attended Harvard University, playing as an end on the football team in 1895 before graduating in 1898.

Newell was vice president of the First National Bank and Trust Company of Kearny, New Jersey. He joined the New Jersey National Guard in 1909 was later promoted to the rank of major after serving as a supply officer with the 113th Infantry Regiment during World War I. Newell died on October 10, 1941, at his home in Arlington, New Jersey, following a 10-month illness.

== Head coaching record ==
Year	Team	Overall	Conference	Standing	Bowl/playoffs
Trinity Bantams (Independent) (1901)
1901	Trinity	1–6–1			
Trinity:		1–6–1			
Total:		1–6–1			
