= Joie Ray (runner) =

American middle and long-distance runner

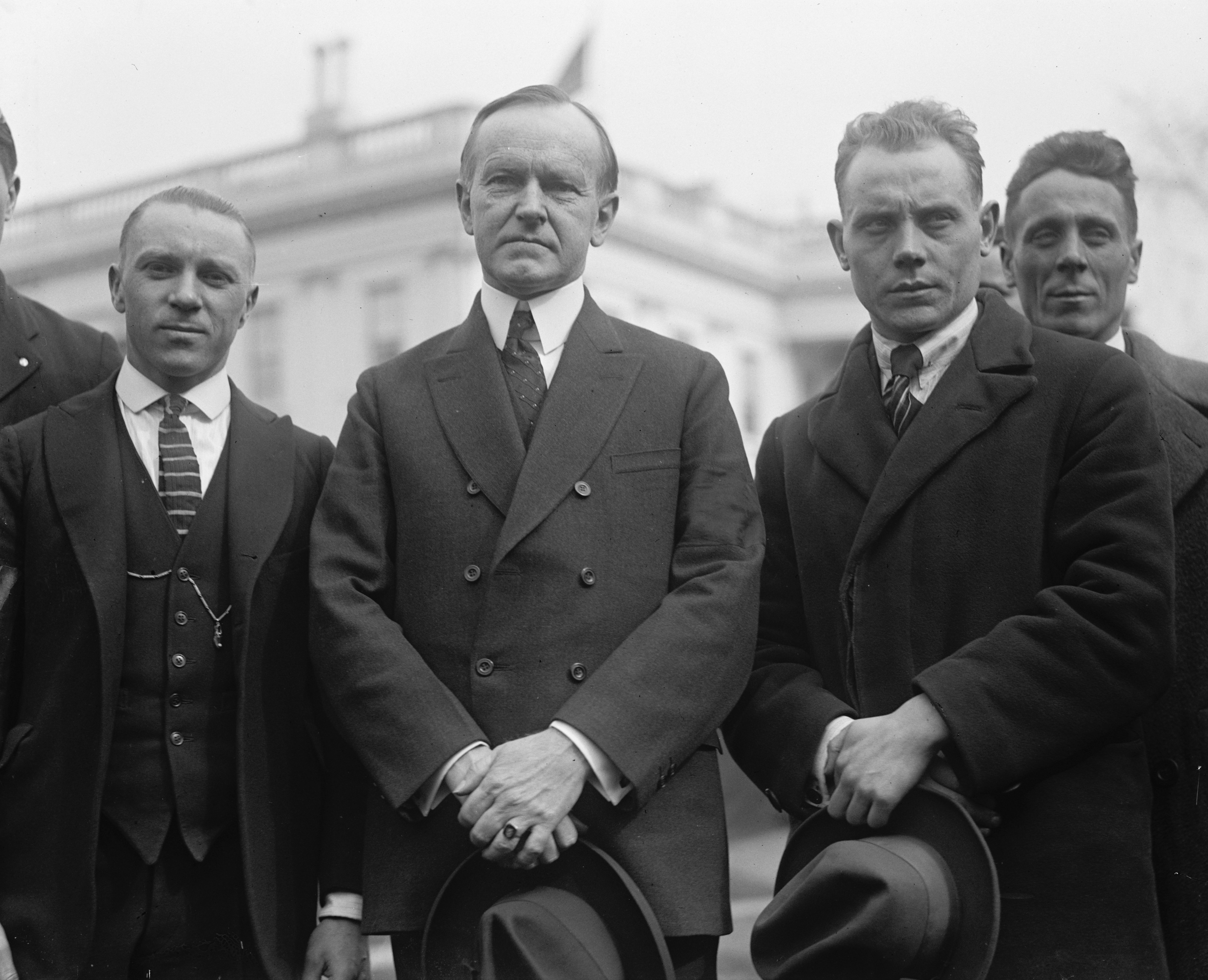
- Joie Ray, left, and Paavo Nurmi, right, visit U.S. President Calvin Coolidge at the White House on February 21, 1925

Personal information
- Full name: Joseph William Ray
- Born: April 13, 1894 Kankakee, Illinois, U.S.
- Died: May 13, 1978 (aged 84) Berrien Springs, Michigan, U.S.
- Height: 5 ft 5 in (165 cm)
- Weight: 118 lb (54 kg)
Medal record
Men's athletics
Representing the United States
Olympic Games
Bronze medal – third place	1924 Paris	3000 m team

Joseph William "Joie" Ray (April 13, 1894 – May 13, 1978) was an American track and field athlete and member of the United States National Track and Field Hall of Fame. He held world records for the 1-mile (1.6 km) and 2-mile (3.2 km) distances. He represented the United States in the three Olympic Games held the 1920s, winning a bronze medal for the 3000 m team race in 1924.

== Biography ==
Ray was born in Kankakee, Illinois, on April 13, 1894. Early in his career, the 5-foot-5-inch (1.65 m) and 118-pound (54 kg) runner—considered short and stocky—competed for the Illinois Athletic Club. Ray was nicknamed "The Kankakee Kid", after his hometown, and "Chesty" or "Chesty Joie" after a newspaper, early in his career, called him "a chesty little guy with a great heart". Ray was considered one of the most versatile distance runners of the 1920s, competing in races from the 1500 metres to marathons. Among his 13 national AAU titles were 8 outdoor mile titles. Ray won the Millrose Games' Wannamaker one and a half-mile (2400 m) race (which changed to the Wanamaker Mile in 1926) seven times in the eight-year span from 1917 to 1924, losing in 1925 to Paavo Nurmi of Finland. Later that same year he tied the indoor mile world record at 4 minutes 12 seconds, and was part of a 4 × 1-mile (4 × 1.6 km) relay that set a world record.

Ray competed for the United States in the 1920 Summer Olympics at Antwerp, placing 8th in the 1500 metre race. In the 1924 Games in Paris, Ray competed in only the 3000 metre team race for which he won a bronze medal. In the 1928 Olympics he placed 14th in the 10000 metres and 5th in the marathon. Though Ray's Olympic results were lackluster, he won over 950 medals in his career. His favorite career moment was his first Boston Marathon in 1928. He finished third despite considerable pain for the last two miles (3.2 km).

In the 1920s, when not competing in running events, Ray was a cab driver, and also competed in other events, dabbling in boxing, roller derby, and snowshoe races in Canada. He preceded his third-place finish in the 1928 Boston Marathon by competing in a dance marathon for 1,730 hours. Later in life, Ray worked in a steel mill in Gary, Indiana, moving to Michigan after retiring.

Ray continued to run throughout his life. At age 68, he was timed at 6:18.3 on a 1-mile (1,600 m) course, a time he bettered on his 70th birthday, with a time of 6:11.5. Ray was elected to the U.S. National Track and Field Hall of Fame in 1976. Ray died on May 13, 1978, in Berrien Springs, Michigan, after a short illness.
