= Gil Dodds =

American middle-distance runner

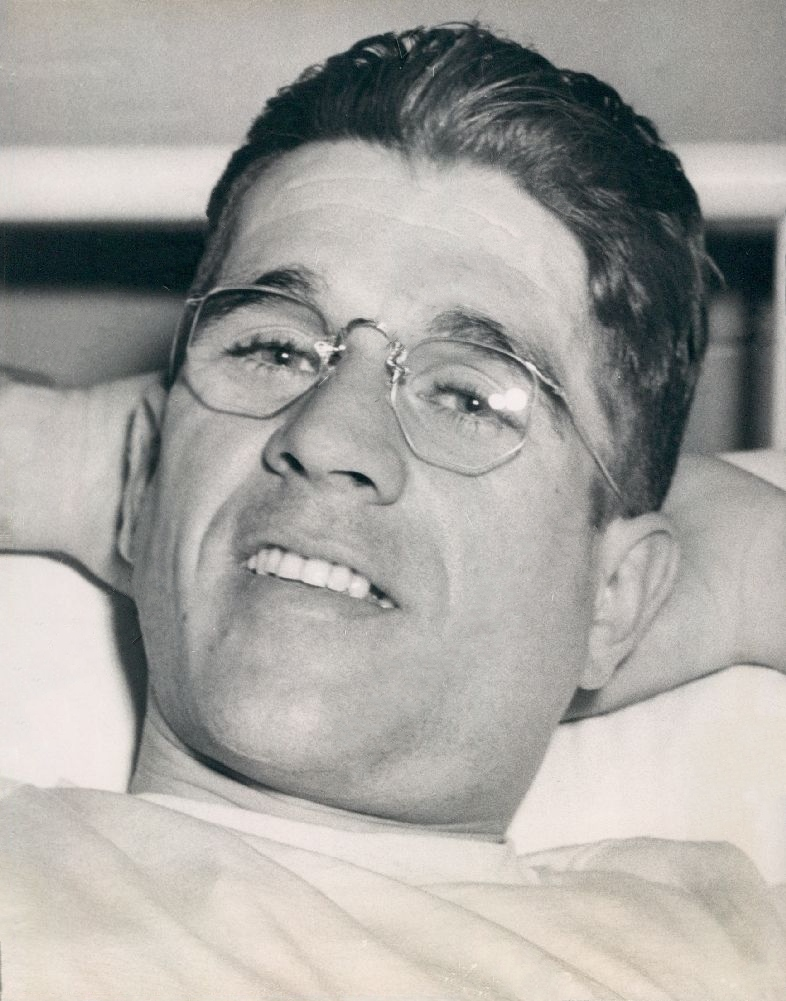
- Dodds in a hospital with mumps

Personal information
- Full name: Gilbert Lothair Dodds
- Born: June 23, 1918 Norcatur, Kansas, US
- Died: February 3, 1977 (aged 58)
- Height: 5 ft 9 in (1.75 m)
- Weight: 148 lb (67 kg)

Sport
- Country: United States
- Sport: Track and field
- Events: 800 m, 1500 m, mile run
- Club: Boston Athletic Association
- Coached by: Lloyd Hahn; Jack Ryder
- Retired: 1947

Achievements and titles
- Personal bests: 800 m – 1:52.6 (1946); 1500 m – 3:48.5 (1943); Mile – 4:05.3; World Record Holder (indoors) (1944–1948), American Record Holder (1943)
- Updated on December 29, 2008

Gilbert Lothair Dodds (June 23, 1918 – February 3, 1977), called "the Flying Parson", was an American middle-distance runner. In the 1940s, he held the American and world records for the mile run. He was awarded the James E. Sullivan Award as the top amateur athlete in the United States in 1943.

== Biography ==
Gilbert Lothair Dodds was born in Norcatur, Kansas, one of five children and the son of Rev. and Mrs. J. G. Dodds. His minister father was half English and half Irish; his mother was of German ancestry.

The family moved to Falls City, Nebraska, when Rev. Dodds became the minister at Falls City Brethren Church. Gil Dodds attended Falls City High School, where he became a distance runner, coached by Lloyd Hahn, a runner in the 1924 Summer Olympics who lived nearby. Dodds never lost a race in high school. In 1935, he entered two events at a track meet in Peru, Nebraska, and won both, setting state records in the mile (4:49.6) and half-mile (2:09.5), breaking the old records by 13.4 and 4.5 seconds, respectively. He was the state champion in the mile race in 1935, 1936 and 1937 and held the state record at 4:28.1 when he graduated in 1937. As a junior in high school, he developed a hernia while playing tennis; for the rest of his running career, he wore a truss while running to protect himself.

He attended Ashland College (A.B., 1941), Gordon Divinity School (B.Div., 1945) and Wheaton College (M.A., 1948) and had a winning steak of 39 races. On November 25, 1940, Dodds took his first national championship when he won the NCAA Men's Cross Country Championship in East Lansing, Michigan. Dodds was the AAU indoor mile champion in 1942, 1944, and 1947. Outdoors he set the American mile record of 4:06.5 in 1943 in Boston, finishing second to Sweden's Gunder Hägg.

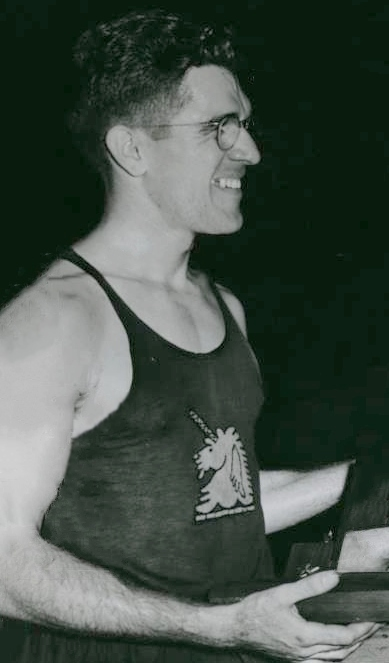
Dodds in 1944

On March 11, 1944, Dodds broke the world indoor record for the mile run at the annual Knights of Columbus track meet in Madison Square Garden, New York City. His time of 4:07.2 broke the old record by 0.1 second, which was jointly held by Glenn Cunningham, Charles Fenske and Leslie MacMitchell. One week later, Dodds lowered his own world indoor mile record to 4:06.4 at Chicago Stadium on March 18, 1944.

Known as "the Flying Parson", he graduated from seminary in 1945 and retired from running to be a full-time minister.

In 1947, he resumed running with the goal of making the 1948 Olympic team. In January 1948, he won his third Wanamaker Mile in 4:05.3, a career best time and the third time he had broken the world indoor record for the mile. One week before the Olympic Trials, he caught the mumps and injured his Achilles tendon and could not run the qualifying meet. He went on to work with the new "Youth for Christ" youth organization and became the track and cross country coach at Wheaton College (1945–1959).

In 1954, he received an additional M.A. degree in education from Northwestern University.

== Ministry ==
As part of his ministry, Dodds used a personal story to explain the Scripture verse Hebrews 12:1, "let us strip off every weight that slows us down, especially the sin that so easily hinders our progress, and run with endurance the race that lies before us."

Runner Gil Dodds was once preparing for a race. After a series of stretching exercises, Dodd ran several warm-up laps around the track. Just before the race began, he quickly changed into some other track shoes.

One of the onlookers asked why he was changing shoes. Dodds tossed to the inquirer one of his warm-up shoes. Then one of his racing shoes. The man was still puzzled. There was no detectable difference in the two shoes. Both looked the same. Both seemed to weigh the same. Then Dodds explained. There indeed was a difference. The warm-up shoes were slightly heavier than his racing shoes. Though only a small difference, saving even that much weight for the race could spell the difference between victory and defeat.

== Personal life ==
Dodds married Erma Louise Seeger, whom he met at Falls City High School. They had four children; Jack, Jann, Michel, and Joel.

== Awards and honors ==
Dodds was awarded the James E. Sullivan Award as the top amateur athlete in the United States in 1943. He was inducted into the Nebraska High School Sports Hall of Fame in 1997.

== References and notes ==
Records
Preceded by Glenn Cunningham (United States); Charles Fenske (United States); Leslie MacMitchell (United States)	Men's Mile World Record Holder (indoors); March 11, 1944 – February 15, 1954	Succeeded by Wes Santee
