= Men's 600 yards world record progression =

The following tables show the world record progression in the men's 600 yards.

== Outdoor ==
Time	Auto	Athlete	Nationality	Location of race	Date	Ref.
1:15.0		James Clegg	United Kingdom	Sheffield, England	July 7, 1873	
1:14.6		Frederick Elborough	United Kingdom	London, England	April 28, 1877	
1:14.5		Lon Myers	United States	West New Brighton, New York, United States	May 29, 1880	
1:11.4		Lon Myers	United States	New York, New York, United States	July 1, 1882	
1:11.4		William Downs	United States	Bergen Point, New Jersey, United States	November 16, 1889	
1:11.0		Thomas Burke	United States	New York, New York, United States	September 19, 1896	
1:11.0		Edwin Montague	United Kingdom	London, England	September 19, 1908	
1:10.8		Mel Sheppard	United States	New York, New York, United States	August 14, 1910	
1:10.4		Douglas Lowe	United Kingdom	London, England	June 26, 1926	
1:09.2		Ben Eastman	United States	San Francisco, California, United States	April 1, 1933	
1:08.8		Ben Eastman	United States	San Francisco, California, United States	June 2, 1934	
1:08.5		Willie Atterberry	United States	Columbus, Ohio, United States	April 20, 1957	
1:08.1		Hardee McAlhaney	United States	Houston, Texas, United States	January 25, 1969	
	1:06.87	Butch Reynolds	United States	Johnson City, Tennessee, United States	January 17, 1987	

== Indoor ==
Time	Auto	Athlete	Nationality	Location of race	Date	Ref.
1:17.8		Gabriel G. Hollander	United States	unknown	unknown	
1:16.4		Gabriel G. Hollander	United States	New York, New York, United States	March 25, 1897	
1:14.0		Eli B. Parsons	United States	New York, New York, United States	March 3, 1906	
1:14.0		John Baxter Taylor	United States	New York, New York, United States	February 9, 1907	
1:13.6		Mel Sheppard	United States	Brooklyn, New York, United States	March 30, 1907	
1:13.4		Tom Halpin	United States	Brooklyn, New York, United States	March 2, 1914	
1:12.8		Jake Driscoll	United States	Buffalo, New York, United States	April 14, 1923	
1:11.6		Alan Helffrich	United States	New York, New York, United States	March 17, 1925	
1:11.3		Charles Hornbostel	United States	New York, New York, United States	February 2, 1935	
1:11.1		James Herbert	United States	New York, New York, United States	March 12, 1938	
1:11.1		James Herbert	United States	Chicago, Illinois, United States	March 26, 1938	
1:10.8		James Herbert	United States	New York, New York, United States	March 9, 1940	
1:10.2		John Borican	United States	New York, New York, United States	March 8, 1941	
1:10.2		Hugh Short	United States	New York, New York, United States	February 6, 1943	
1:10.2		Mal Whitfield	United States	Boston, Massachusetts, United States	January 31, 1953	
1:09.5		Mal Whitfield	United States	New York, New York, United States	February 28, 1953	
1:09.5		Tom Courtney	United States	Boston, Massachusetts, United States	February 2, 1957	
1:09.3		George Kerr	Jamaica	New York, New York, United States	March 3, 1961	
1:09.2		Wendell Mottley	Trinidad and Tobago	Ithaca, New York, United States	February 29, 1964	
1:09.0		Martin McGrady	United States	Louisville, Kentucky, United States	February 12, 1966	
1:08.7		Martin McGrady	United States	Los Angeles, California, United States	February 13, 1970	
1:08.7		Lee Evans	United States	Los Angeles, California, United States	February 13, 1970	
1:08.5		Martin McGrady	United States	Louisville, Kentucky, United States	February 14, 1970	
1:07.6		Martin McGrady	United States	New York, New York, United States	February 27, 1970	
	1:07.53	Mark Everett	United States	New York, New York, United States	February 7, 1992	
	1:06.93	Moitalel Naadokila	Kenya	Lubbock, Texas, United States	February 15, 2020	
	1:06.68 OT	Jonathan Jones	Barbados	Ames, Iowa, United States	February 26, 2022	
	1:05.75	Jenoah McKiver	United States	Lubbock, Texas, United States	January 18, 2025	
