= James Connolly (runner) =

American long-distance runner

Medal record

Men's athletics

Representing the United States

Olympic Games
Bronze medal – third place	1924 Paris	3000 metre team

James Joseph Connolly (January 4, 1900 – September 30, 1940) was an American track and field athlete. Connolly represented the United States at the 1920 and 1924 Summer Olympics, and was part of the bronze medal-winning American team in the 3000-meter team race at the 1924 Olympics in Paris.

== Sources ==
- Evans, Hilary; Gjerde, Arild; Heijmans, Jeroen; Mallon, Bill; et al. "James Connolly". Olympics at Sports-Reference.com. Sports Reference LLC. Archived from the original on 2012-10-25.
