= Lloyd Hahn =

American middle-distance runner

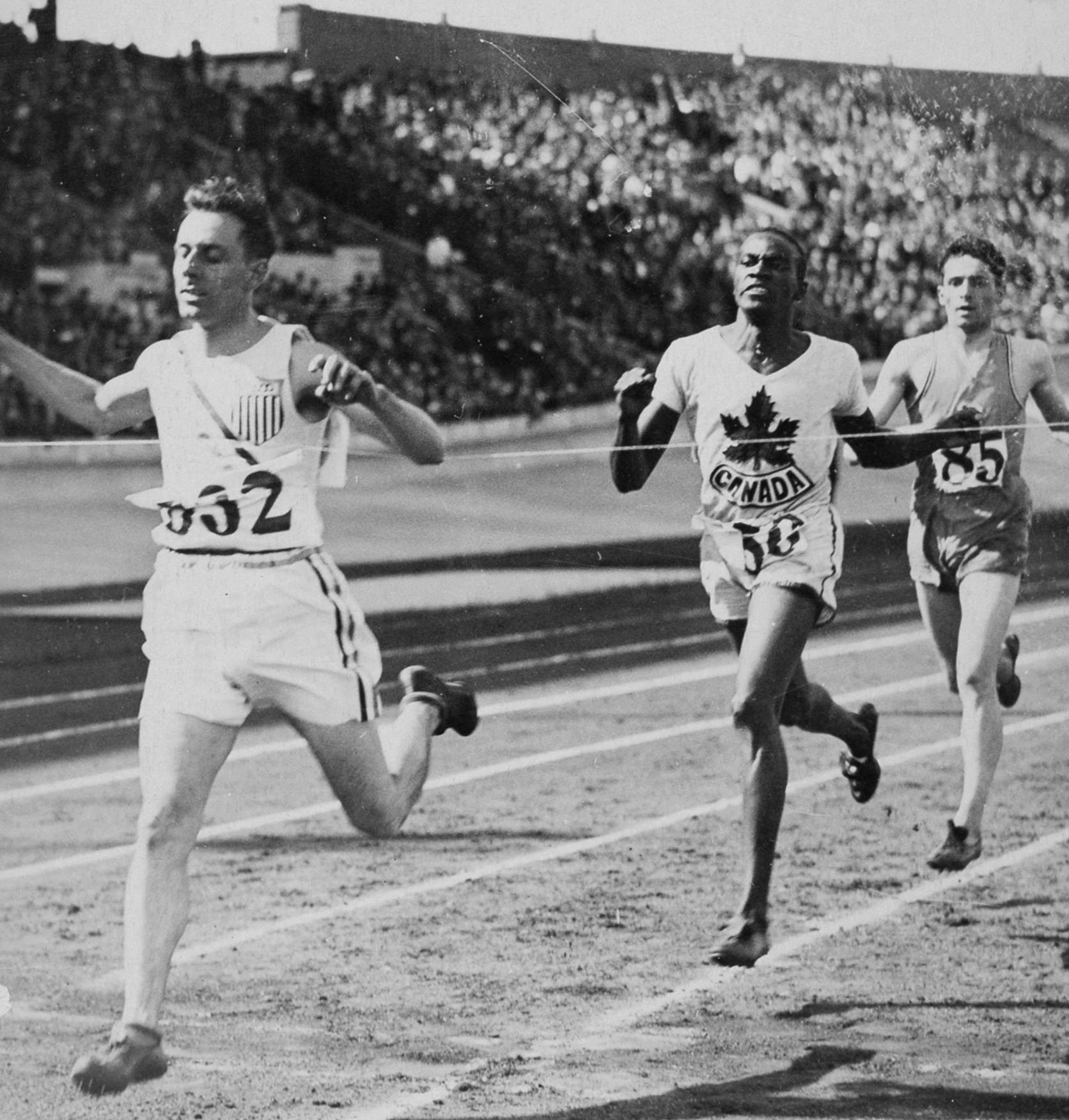
- Lloyd Hahn (left) winning an 800 m semifinal at the 1928 Olympics

Personal information
- Born: August 7, 1898 Falls City, Nebraska, United States
- Died: January 1983 (aged 84) Brighton, Colorado, United States
- Height: 1.75 m (5 ft 9 in)
- Weight: 70 kg (154 lb)

Sport
- Sport: Running
- Club: Boston Athletic Association

Achievements and titles
- Olympic finals: 1924, 1928

Lloyd Hahn (August 7, 1898 – January 1983) was an American runner who competed at the 1924 and 1928 Olympics. In 1924 he finished sixth in the 1500 m. He failed to reach the final in this event in 1928, but finished fifth in the 800 m event. Earlier in 1928 Hahn won the 800 m race at the US Olympic trials, which were combined with AAU Championships that year, setting a new world record at 1:51.4, but the record was not ratified by the IAAF. In 1926 Hahn was part of the US 4×880 yd relay team that broke the world record. Hahn won AAU titles in the mile in 1926 and in the 1,000 yd in 1925 and 1927.

After retiring from competitions Hahn worked as athletics coach, with Gil Dodds among others.
