= Bowerman Mile =

Elite mile race at the Pre Classic

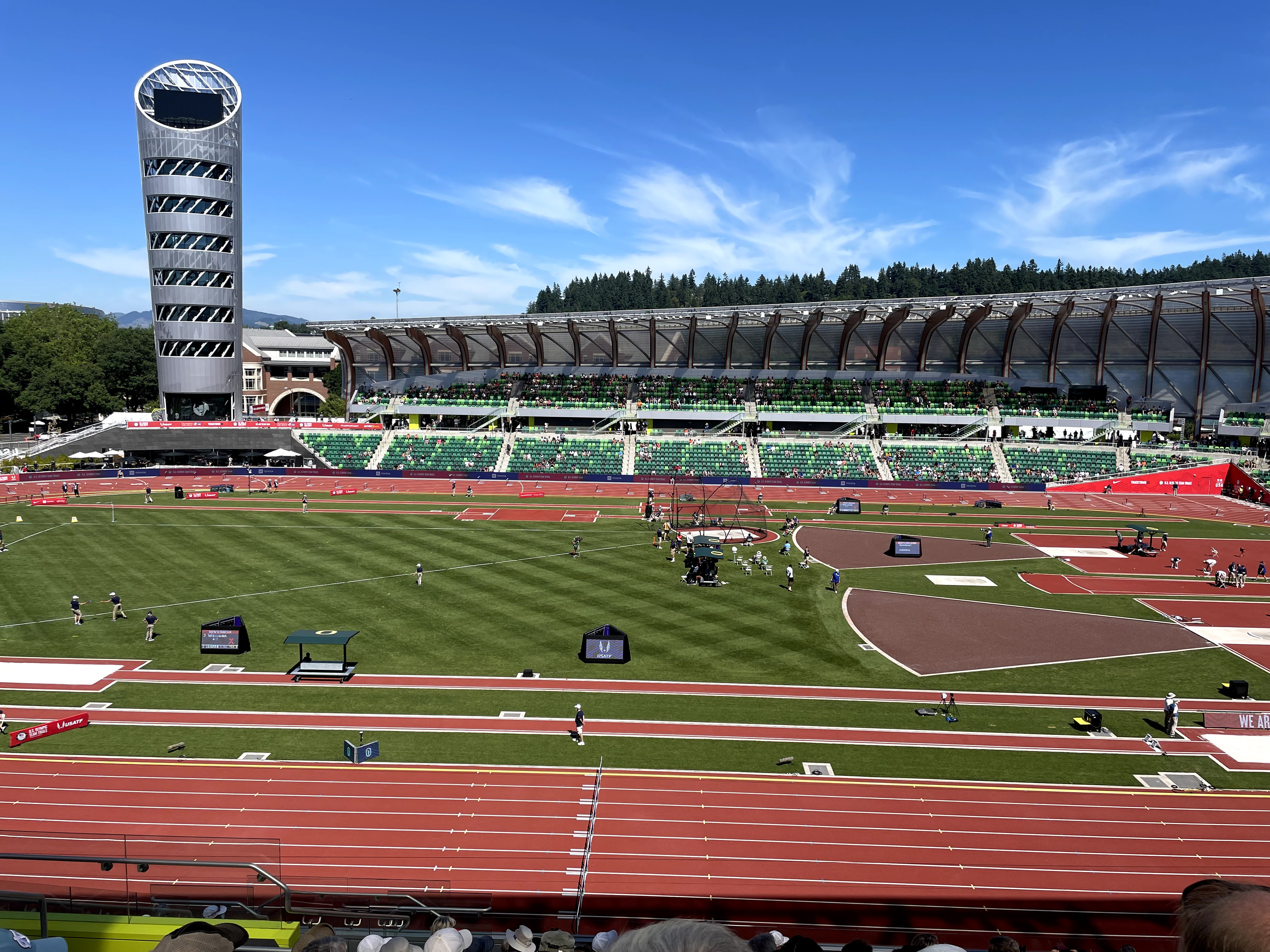
- Hayward Field, the site of the Bowerman Mile.
- Location: Hayward Field; Eugene, Oregon, United States
- Event type: Track and field
- Distance: One Mile (1,609.344 meters)
- Established: 2000
- Organizer: Prefontaine Classic
- Course records: (Norway) Jakob Ingebrigtsen 3:43.73 (2023)

The Bowerman Mile is a mile race for elite middle distance runners held annually at the Prefontaine Classic in Eugene, Oregon.

Along with Oslo's Dream Mile and New York's Wanamaker Mile, the Bowerman Mile is among the world's premier track mile races, and one of the few examples of a major international mile race, since the 1500 meters is the much more common event.

The Bowerman Mile, and the Prefontaine Classic as a whole, is famous for its "Hayward Magic", where the crowds and energy of Hayward Field push competitors to fast times. In fact, between the Bowerman Mile and other mile races held at the University of Oregon, Hayward Field has seen more than 500 sub-four minute mile clockings, the most of any facility in the world.

== History ==
The Prefontaine Classic began in 1973, as a Hayward Restoration meeting. Two years later, the meet was officially founded and was set to be named the "Bowerman Classic" after University of Oregon Coach Bill Bowerman.

However, following Steve Prefontaine's death in 1975, the meeting's name was switched to the Prefontaine Classic in honor of him.

The Prefontaine Classic has held mile races since 1975, but the Bowerman Mile was not established until 2000, where Bill Bowerman's name would find a place to be honored.

=== 2001: Alan Webb's high school mile record ===
At the 2001 Prefontaine Classic, Alan Webb competed in the Bowerman Mile against elite international runners, in a field that included world record holder Hicham El Guerrouj of Morocco, and the 2000 Sydney Olympics 1500m bronze medalist Bernard Lagat of Kenya (at the time).

Although El Guerrouj won in 3:49.92, with Kevin Sullivan (3:51.82), Bernard Lagat (3:53.14) and Adil Kaouch (3:53.40) following behind, the young Webb finished in 5th place. Webb ran 3:53.43 and broke Jim Ryun's national high school record of 3:55.3 that had stood for 36 years.

=== 2023: Jakob Ingebrigtsen's mile & 3000m double ===
In the 2023 Prefontaine Classic & Diamond League Final, on September 16, Norwegian athlete Jakob Ingebrigtsen won the Bowerman Mile, in a time of 3:43.73, with the aid of pacing lights and pacemakers Erik Sowinski & Cameron Myers.

Ingebrigtsen missed Hicham El Guerrouj's mile world record by .60 seconds, still having run the fastest mile in 24 years and the third fastest mile in history at the time.

Ingebrigtsen was closely followed by Yared Nuguse, who finished in an American record time of 3:43.97, breaking Alan Webb's former 2007 American mile record of 3:46.91 by almost three full seconds and running the fourth fastest mile in history at the time.

The race was reminiscent of El Guerrouj's 1999 world record run in Rome, where El Guerrouj won in 3:43.13, but was being closely tracked by Kenyan athlete Noah Ngeny, who came in second place at 3:43.40. El Guerrouj and Ngeny still hold the first and second fastest mile times respectively as of 2023.

These four men (El Guerrouj, Ngeny, Ingebrigtsen, Nuguse) remain the only ones in history to have run a mile under 3:44.00 as of 2024, with the #5 fastest miler of all time being Noureddine Morceli, with his 1993 time of 3:44.39.

The next day, Ingebrigtsen would go on to win the 3000 m, in a time of 7:23.63, beating Yomif Kejelcha by only one hundredth of a second. At the time, this ranked Kejelcha at #4 all time and Ingebrigtsen at #3 all time, behind Hicham El Guerrouj's 7:23.09 and Daniel Komen's world record of 7:20.67.

=== 2024: "The Mile of the Century" ===
A good benchmark of physical fitness for the approaching 2024 Summer Olympics, and an analogue to the Paris 1500m final, the 2024 Bowerman Mile on May 25 featured the greatest 1500 meter and mile runners in the world at the time, including Josh Kerr, Jakob Ingebrigtsen, and Yared Nuguse. This 2024 edition, considering these three athletes and the historically deep field, was billed as the "Mile of the Century".

Kerr won in a new British record time of 3:45.34, eclipsing Steve Cram's previous 1985 record of 3:46.32, with Ingebrigtsen coming second in 3:45.60 and Nuguse in third at 3:46.22.

== Annual Champions ==
Key:

Meet record (bolded)
Former meet records

Year	Athlete	Country	Time
Bowerman Mile
2026	Cameron Myers	Australia	3:46.06
2025	Niels Laros	Netherlands	3:45.94
2024	Josh Kerr	Great Britain	3:45.34
2023	Jakob Ingebrigtsen	Norway	**3:43.73**
2022	Jakob Ingebrigtsen	Norway	3:49.76
2021	Jakob Ingebrigtsen	Norway	3:47.24
2020	Meet Not Held (COVID-19 Pandemic)		
2019	Timothy Cheruiyot	Kenya	3:50.49
2018	Timothy Cheruiyot	Kenya	3:49.87
2017	Ronald Kwemoi	Kenya	3:49.04
2016	Asbel Kiprop	Kenya	3:51.54
2015	Ayanleh Souleiman	Djibouti	3:51.10
2014	Ayanleh Souleiman	Djibouti	3:47.32
2013	Silas Kiplagat	Kenya	3:49.48
2012	Asbel Kiprop	Kenya	3:49.40
2011	Haron Keitany	Kenya	3:49.09
2010	Asbel Kiprop	Kenya	3:49.75
2009	Asbel Kiprop	Kenya	3:48.50
2008	Shadrack Korir	Kenya	3:50.49
2007	Daniel Kipchirchir Komen	Kenya	3:48.28
2006	Bernard Lagat	United States	3:51.53
2005	Alex Kipchirchir	Kenya	3:50.91
2004	Alan Webb	United States	3:50.85
2003	Bernard Lagat	Kenya	3:50.21
2002	Hicham El Guerrouj	Morocco	3:50.89
2001	Hicham El Guerrouj	Morocco	3:49.92
2000	William Chirchir	Kenya	3:51.84
Pre-Bowerman Mile
1999	Noah Ngeny	Kenya	3:52.09
1998	Daniel Komen	Kenya	3:50.95
1997	Laban Rotich	Kenya	3:52.68
1996	David Kibet	Kenya	3:52.28
1995	Steve Holman	United States	3:52.89
1994	Bob Kennedy	United States	3:56.21
1993	Bob Kennedy	United States	3:56.71
1992	Not Held (Meet had 1500m)		
1991	Doug Consiglio	Canada	3:59.80
1990	Maurice Smith	United States	3:57.36
1989	Tim Hacker	United States	4:02.12
1988	Joaquim Cruz	Brazil	3:56.9h
1987	Joaquim Cruz	Brazil	3:56.36
1986	Jim Spivey	United States	3:58.80
1985	Not Held (Meet had 1500m)		
1984	Steve Scott	United States	3:54.44
1983	Tom Byers	United States	3:53.25
1982	Sydney Maree	United States	3:54.10
1981	Not Held (Meet had 1500m)		
1980	Not Held (Meet had 1500m)		
1979	Phil Kane	United States	4:03.1h
1978	Not Held (Meet had 1500m)		
1977	Steve Scott	United States	3:57.9h
1976	Not Held (Meet had 1500m)		
1975	Lars Kaupang	Norway	4:01.4h

== Other "Miles" at the Prefontaine Classic ==
=== Men ===
The Bowerman Mile is not to be confused with an "International Mile", a race held in conjunction with the Bowerman Mile, from 2010-2018, and in 2021. The meet record for this "International Mile" is held by Ethan Strand, with his 2025 clocking of 3:48.86.

In 2015, a high school boys' mile was also held, which was won by Carlos Villarreal of Mexico, in a time of 4:05.25.

In 2004, 2008, 2013, and 2022, a 1500m run was held in addition to the Bowerman Mile. Standalone 1500 meter races were also held in 1976, 1978, 1980-1981, 1985, and 1992. The fastest 1500m time recorded, not en-route to a mile, was Samuel Tanner of New Zealand's 2022 time of 3:34.37. Otherwise, the fastest 1500m recorded at the Prefontaine Classic was 3:28.90 by Jakob Ingebrigtsen of Norway, en route to his 2023 time of 3:43.73.

=== Women ===
As of 2024, there is no Women's Bowerman Mile, with women instead competing in the 1500 meter run. Faith Kipyegon of Kenya holds the Prefontaine 1500 meter record, with her 2025 world record time of 3:48.68.

However, in 1975, 1987-1989, 1991, and 1993, a mile run was held for women instead of the 1500 meters, with Mary Decker holding the meet record with her 1988 time of 4:21.25.

A high school girls' mile was also held in 2015, won by Ryen Frazier of the United States, in a time of 4:39.84.

== See also ==
- Mile run world record progression
- Four-minute mile
- Dream Mile
- Emsley Carr Mile
- Wanamaker Mile
