= Emsley Carr Mile =

Annual UK running event

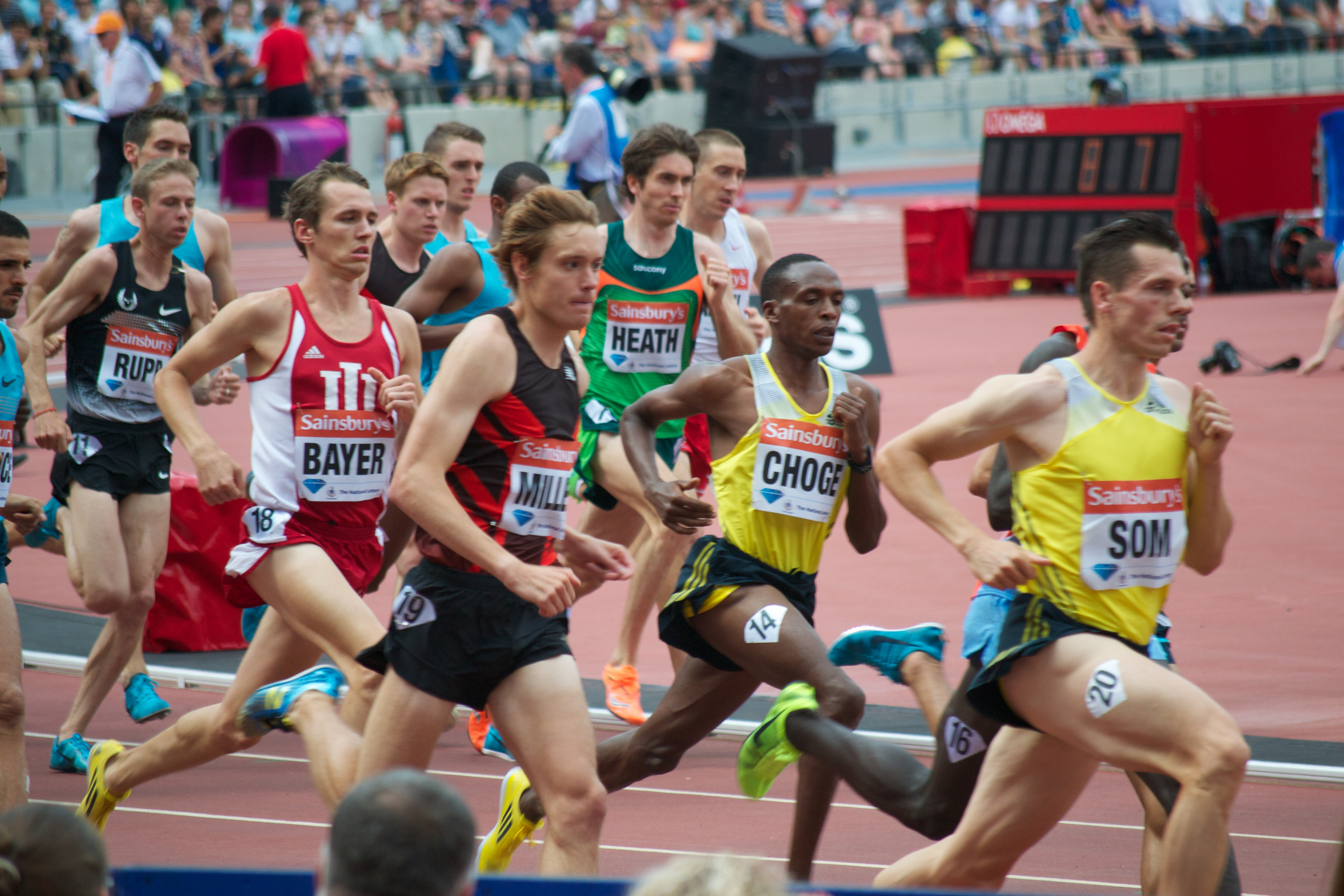
- Augustine Choge (second right) on his way to winning the 2013 Emsley Carr Mile held at the Olympic Stadium, London.
- Location: Various locations in the United Kingdom
- Event type: Track
- Distance: 1 Mile race
- Established: 1953
- Participants: By invitation

The Emsley Carr Mile is an annual invitational athletics running event held in the United Kingdom over one mile for men.

== History ==
The race was inaugurated in 1953 by Sir William Carr in memory of his father Sir Emsley Carr, a former editor of the News of the World. The event was created to encourage athletes to break the four-minute mile. By the second time the race was run, Roger Bannister had already broken the world record on 6 May 1954 at the annual athletics event between the Amateur Athletics Association (AAA) and the University of Oxford at the Iffley Road Track in Oxford. Bannister never did run in the Emsley Carr Mile.

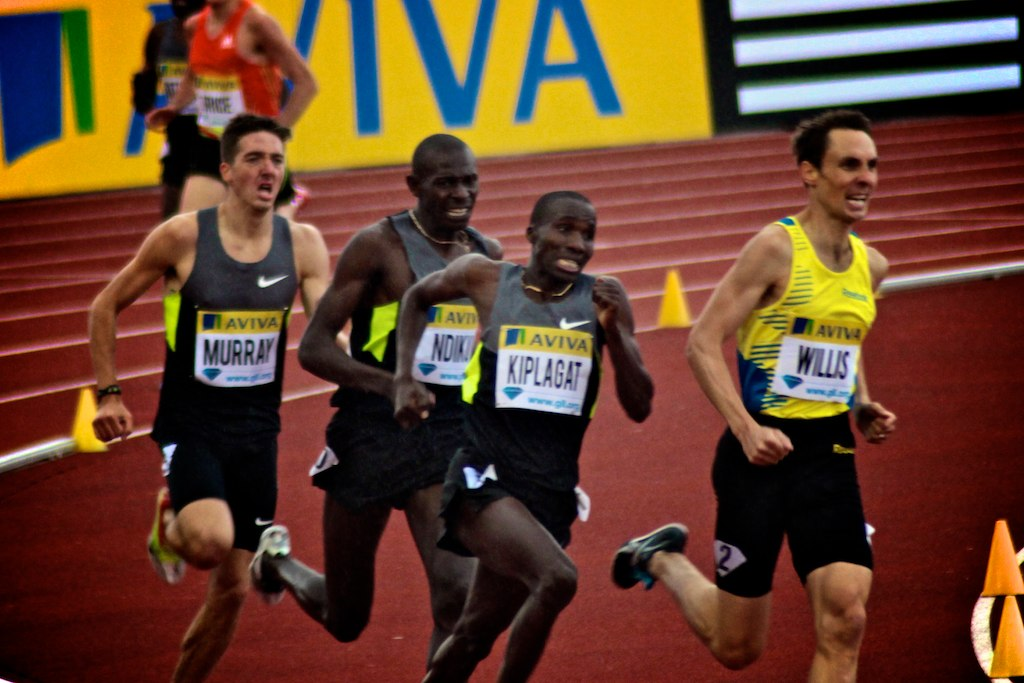
Silas Kiplagat (second right) on his way to winning the 2012 Emsley Carr Mile

The winners of the race sign the Emsley Carr Trophy, a red Moroccan leather-bound book, now running into a second volume since 1980. It contains a history of mile running since 1868 from around the world and also includes signatures of many of the world's leading milers, including Paavo Nurmi, Sydney Wooderson, John Landy, Gordon Pirie, and Roger Bannister. The race has been won by eleven Olympic champions, Kip Keino, Steve Ovett, Murray Halberg, John Walker, Geoff Smith, Sebastian Coe, Saïd Aouita, William Tanui, Vénuste Niyongabo, Haile Gebrselassie, Asbel Kiprop, and Hicham El Guerrouj. It has also been won by eight athletes who have held the world record for the mile: Walker, Ovett, Coe, El Guerrouj, Filbert Bayi, Derek Ibbotson, Jim Ryun and Josh Kerr. Kerr set his world record in the 2026 Emsley Carr Mile.

Ken Wood, a former Sheffield athlete, won the Emsley Carr Mile a record four times. The fastest time recorded for the event stands at 3:42.66 (the world record), set by Kerr in 2026. This beat the previous British all-comers’ record, set by El Guerrouj in the 2000 Emsley Carr Mile.

In 1969 Sir William Carr decided not to continue sponsoring the race and the AAA took it over and continued until he died in 1977. Since 1977, Emsley Carr's grandson, William, has continued with the tradition and has kept the book up to date and has provided a glass piece, presented to the winner by a member of the Carr family.

== Winners ==
1953–1988
Year	Winner	Time	Venue
1953	Gordon Pirie (GBR)	4:06.80	White City Stadium, London
1954	Ken Wood (GBR)	4:04.80	White City Stadium, London
1955	Ken Wood (GBR)	4:05.40	White City Stadium, London
1956	Derek Ibbotson (GBR)	3:59.40	White City Stadium, London
1957	Ken Wood (GBR)	4:02.00	White City Stadium, London
1958	Murray Halberg (NZL)	4:06.50	White City Stadium, London
1959	Derek Ibbotson (GBR)	4:03.10	White City Stadium, London
1960	László Tábori (USA)	4:00.30	White City Stadium, London
1961	Ken Wood (GBR)	4:08.40	White City Stadium, London
1962	Jim Beatty (USA)	3:56.52	White City Stadium, London
1963	Bill Crothers (CAN)	4:06.50	White City Stadium, London
1964	Witold Baran (POL)	3:56.04	White City Stadium, London
1965	Alan Simpson (GBR)	4:04.11	White City Stadium, London
1966	Kip Keino (KEN)	3:53.42	White City Stadium, London
1967	Jim Ryun (USA)	3:56.02	White City Stadium, London
1968	John Whetton (GBR)	3:58.56	White City Stadium, London
1969	Francesco Arese (ITA)	3:57.80	Crystal Palace, London
1970	Ian Stewart (GBR)	3:57.40	Meadowbank Stadium, Edinburgh
1971	Peter Stewart (GBR)	4:00.40	Meadowbank Stadium, Edinburgh
1972	Peter Stewart (GBR)	3:55.30	Crystal Palace, London
1973	Frank Clement (GBR)	4:01.81	Crystal Palace, London
1974	Frank Clement (GBR)	3:57.44	Crystal Palace, London
1975	Filbert Bayi (TAN)	3:55.50	Crystal Palace, London
1976	David Moorcroft (GBR)	3:57.06	Crystal Palace, London
1977	Sebastian Coe (GBR)	3:57.67	Crystal Palace, London
1978	John Robson (GBR)	3:55.83	Crystal Palace, London
1979	Steve Ovett (GBR)	3:56.58	Gateshead Stadium, Gateshead
1980	Colin Reitz (GBR)	4:00.60	Meadowbank Stadium, Edinburgh
1981	Geoff Smith (GBR)	3:55.80	Cwmbran Stadium, Cwmbran
1982	David Moorcroft (GBR)	3:57.84	Crystal Palace, London
1983	Sebastian Coe (GBR)	4:03.37	Alexander Stadium, Birmingham
1984	Peter Elliott (GBR)	3:55.71	Gateshead Stadium, Gateshead
1985	Mark Rowland (GBR)	4:01.70	Morfa Stadium, Swansea
1986	Neil Horsfield (GBR)	3:57.03	Morfa Stadium, Swansea
1987	John Walker (NZL)	3:58.75	Gateshead Stadium, Gateshead
1988	Chris McGeorge (GBR)	4:07.07	Crystal Palace, London

1989–present
Year	Winner	Time	Venue
1989	Saïd Aouita (MAR)	3:51.97	Gateshead Stadium, Gateshead
1990	Peter Elliott (GBR)	3:55.51	Gateshead Stadium, Gateshead
1991	Peter Elliott (GBR)	3:52.10	Don Valley Stadium, Sheffield
1992	Steve Crabb (GBR)	3:58.76	Don Valley Stadium, Sheffield
1993	Phillimon Hanneck (ZIM)	3:57.06	Mountbatten Centre, Portsmouth
1994	Kevin McKay (GBR)	3:58.72	Gateshead Stadium, Gateshead
1995	Vénuste Niyongabo (BDI)	3:49.80	Crystal Palace, London
1996	William Tanui (KEN)	3:54.57	Don Valley Stadium, Sheffield
1997	Vénuste Niyongabo (BDI)	3:53.28	Don Valley Stadium, Sheffield
1998	Laban Rotich (KEN)	3:51.74	Don Valley Stadium, Sheffield
1999	Haile Gebrselassie (ETH)	3:52.39	Gateshead Stadium, Gateshead
2000	Hicham El Guerrouj (MAR)	3:45.96	Crystal Palace, London
2001	Hicham El Guerrouj (MAR)	3:49.41	Crystal Palace, London
2002	Hicham El Guerrouj (MAR)	3:50.86	Crystal Palace, London
2003	Paul Korir (KEN)	3:48.17	Crystal Palace, London
2004	Paul Korir (KEN)	3:49.84	Crystal Palace, London
2005	Michael East (GBR)	3:52.50	Don Valley Stadium, Sheffield
2006	Gabe Jennings (USA)	4:10.02	Alexander Stadium, Birmingham
2007	Jon Rankin (USA)	3:54.24	Stretford Stadium, Manchester
2008	Shedrack Kibet Korir (KEN)	3:54.68	Crystal Palace, London
2009	Bernard Lagat (USA)	3:52.71	Crystal Palace, London
2010	Augustine Choge (KEN)	3:50.14	Crystal Palace, London
2011	Leonel Manzano (USA)	3:51.21	Crystal Palace, London
2012	Silas Kiplagat (KEN)	3:52.44	Crystal Palace, London
2013	Augustine Choge (KEN)	3:50.01	Olympic Stadium, London
2014	Asbel Kiprop (KEN)	3:51.89	Alexander Stadium, Birmingham
2015	Asbel Kiprop (KEN)	3:54.87	Olympic Stadium, London
2016	Silas Kiplagat (KEN)	3:53.04	Olympic Stadium, London
2017	Jake Wightman (GBR)	3:54.92	Alexander Stadium, Birmingham
2018	Stewart McSweyn (AUS)	3:54.60	Alexander Stadium, Birmingham
2019	Samuel Tefera (ETH)	3:49.45	Olympic Stadium, London
2020	Cancelled due to the COVID-19 pandemic in the United Kingdom		
2021	Elliot Giles (GBR)	3:52.49	International Stadium, Gateshead
2022	Matthew Stonier (GBR)	3:54.89	Parliament Hill, London
2023	Adam Fogg (GBR)	3:55.70	Sportcity, Manchester
2024	Olli Hoare (AUS)	3:49.03	Olympic Stadium, London
2025	Henry McLuckie (GBR)	3:53.99	University of Stirling
2026	Josh Kerr (GBR)	3:42.66	London Stadium

== See also ==
- Mile run world record progression
- Four-minute mile
- Dicksonpokalen
- Dream Mile
- Bowerman Mile
- Wanamaker Mile
