= Mile run =

Common middle-distance running event

Athletics Mile run
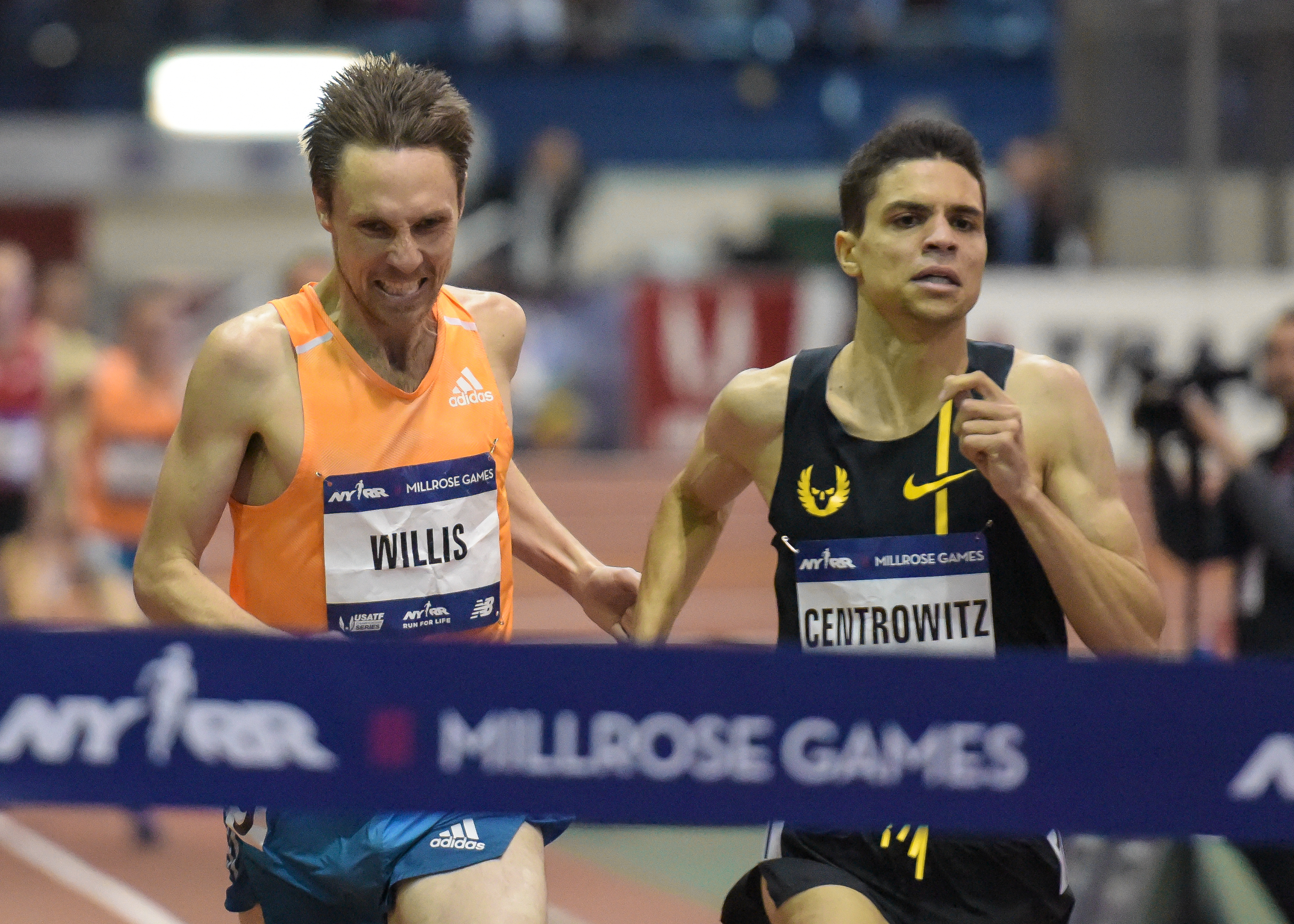
- Matt Centrowitz and Nick Willis racing for first place in the 2015 Wanamaker Mile. Centrowitz beat Willis by 0.11 seconds, in a time of 3:51.35.

World records
- Men: Josh Kerr (GBR) 3:42.66 (2026)
- Women: Faith Kipyegon (KEN) 4:07.64 (2023)

Short track world records
- Men: Jakob Ingebrigtsen (NOR) 3:45.14 (2025)
- Women: Genzebe Dibaba (ETH) 4:13.31 (2016)

World junior (U20) records
- Men: Cameron Myers (AUS) 3:47.48 (2025)
- Women: Birke Haylom (ETH) 4:17.13 (2023)

The mile run (1,760 yards, 5,280 feet, or exactly 1,609.344 metres) is a middle-distance foot race.

The one mile run was a common athletic event in 18th and 19th century England, primarily for gambling purposes. It survived track and field's switch to metric distances in the 1900s and retained its popularity, with the chase for the four-minute mile in the 1950s a high point for the race.

In spite of the roughly equivalent 1500 metres race, which is used instead of the mile at the World Championships and Olympic Games and is sometimes referred as the foremost middle-distance track event in athletics, the mile run is present in all fields of athletics. Since 1976, it is the only imperial distance World Athletics has on its books for official world records. (Note: The marathon race is commonly described in both imperial and metric distances. Although it was first run under imperial measurement of 26 miles, it was slightly elongated for the 1908 Summer Olympics in London to reach its current distance, and is now measured in kilometres for official purposes.)

Although the mile is not featured at any major championships, the Wanamaker Mile, Dream Mile, Emsley Carr Mile and Bowerman Mile races are among the foremost annual middle-distance races. The Commonwealth Games reintroduced the mile race to its championship athletics program from 2026, in tribute to the tradition of the distance in Commonwealth nations, and particularly the rivalry between the Englishman Roger Bannister and his Australian rival John Landy to run the first four-minute mile.

Athletics Road Mile
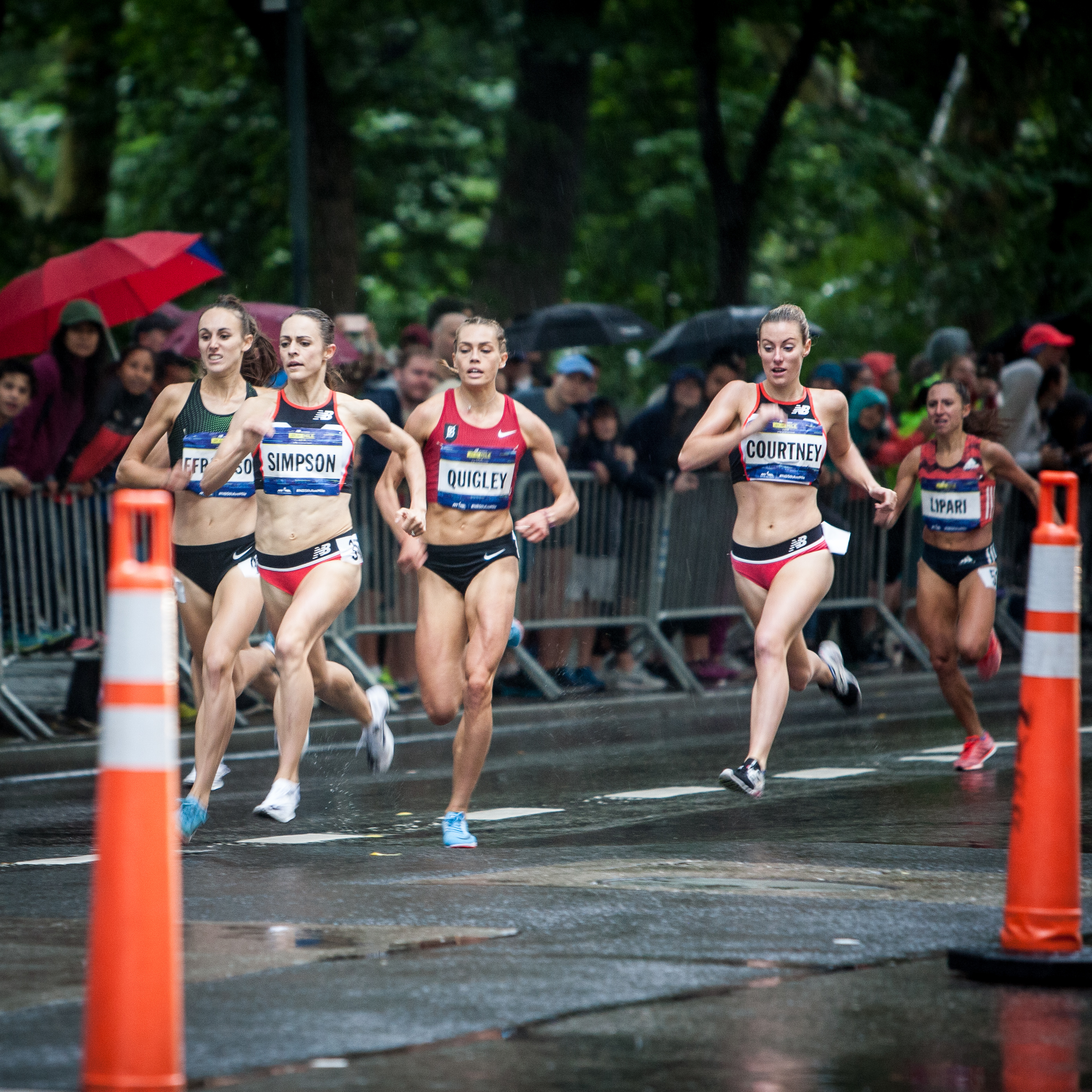
- 2018 Women's Fifth Avenue Mile

World records
- Men: Elliot Giles (GBR) 3:51.3 (2024)
- Women: Diribe Welteji (ETH) 4:20.98 (2023)

The current mile world record holders are Josh Kerr of Great Britain with a time of 3:42.66 and Faith Kipyegon of Kenya with the women's record of 4:07.64.

Despite being only 109.344 metres longer, the mile is distinctly different from its much more common 1500 metres counterpart. Former world record holder Hicham El Guerrouj considers the mile to be his more challenging event.

“My favourite is 1500m. It’s part of my heart. I competed in it a lot and I know every metre of this race. The mile is completely different. If you are not strong physically and mentally, you cannot run it well.”

— Hicham El Guerrouj

Each lap during Kerr's world record run averaged 55.34 seconds per 400 m. Along with Kerr, only five other men in history have broken the 3:45 barrier in the mile: Hicham El Guerrouj, Noah Ngeny, Jakob Ingebrigtsen, Yared Nuguse, and Noureddine Morceli.

When the mile is run, the time is often taken at 1500 metres, in effect when entering the home straight. As in the case with Kerr's world record run, runners approaching national, area or world records in the mile distance can break an official 1500 metre record en route; in Kerr's case, breaking his own national 1500 metres record on the way to his mile world record.

== History ==
Although a statute mile today is equal to a length of 5,280 feet, the distance of the English mile gained its current definition of 1,760 yards through a statute of the Parliament of England in 1593. Thus, the history of the mile run began in England and it initially found usage within the wagered running contests of the 18th and 19th century. Such contests would attract large numbers of spectators and gamblers – so many that the activity became a professional one for its more-established participants.

By 1790, mile footraces were being wagered on. In September 1790, Wood of Lancashire and Harper of Cheshire ran a mile in 4 minutes 51 seconds. Later that month, a huntsman improved the time to 4 minutes 39 seconds running barefoot.

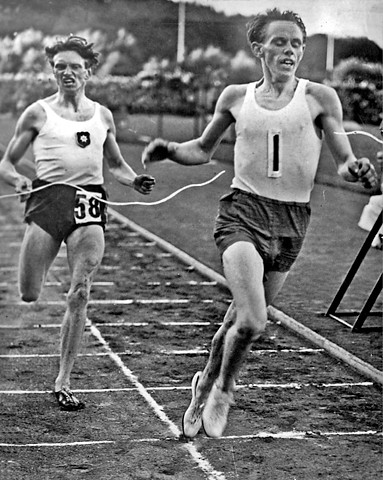
Gunder Hägg (right) defeats Arne Andersson with a world record time of 4:06.2 in Gothenburg, 1942.

The mile run was at the heart of the divide between professional and amateur sports in the late 19th century, as running was beginning to gain popularity in the sports world. Separate world record categories were kept for amateurs and professionals, with professional runners providing the faster times. High-profile contests between Britons William Cummings and Walter George brought much publicity to the sport, as did George's races against the American Lon Myers. The mile run was also one of the foremost events at the amateur AAA Championships. Although the spotlight was shining on the running scene, the categories remained distinct but the respective rise in amateurism and decline of the professional sector saw the division become irrelevant in the 20th century.

Prior to metrication, many tracks in the United States and the Commonwealth of Nations were constructed to the specifications of one quarter of a mile, 440 yards (402.336 m). Thus, when the mile was run, the race was four laps. The Commonwealth Games officially converted to metric in the mid-1960s. The United States adopted metric rules in the mid to late 1970s, though some tracks are still constructed to be a quarter of a mile in length requiring calibrated painted lines to run metric races.

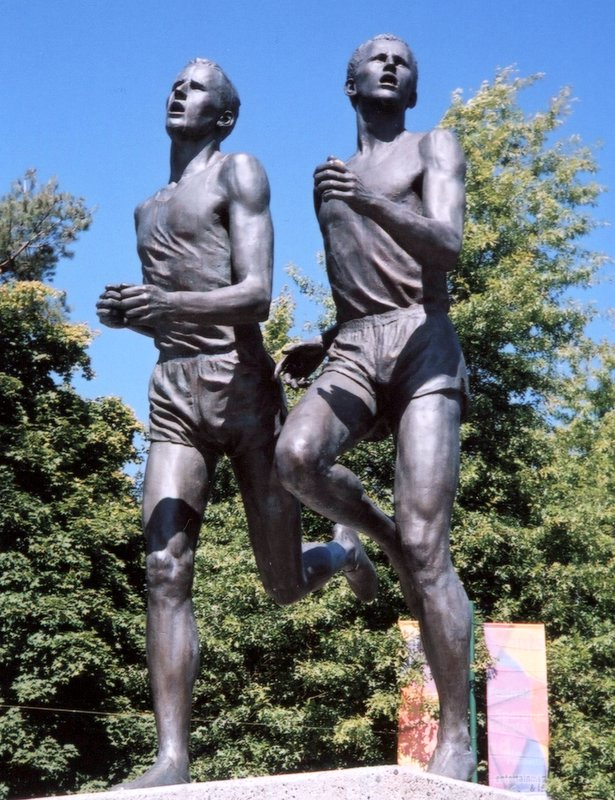
A statue commemorating Roger Bannister and John Landy's Miracle Mile in 1954

The mile run continued to be a popular distance in spite of the metrication of track and field and athletics in general, replacing the imperial distance for the metric mile (1500 meters). It was the 1500 metres – sometimes referred to as the metric mile – which was featured on the Olympic athletics programme. The International Amateur Athletics Federation formed in 1912 and confirmed the first officially recognised world record in the mile the following year (4:14.4 minutes run by John Paul Jones).

The fact that the mile run was the only imperial distance to retain its official world record status after 1976 reflects its continued popularity in the international (and principally metric) era. Decades later, the distance remains widespread, and is often used as a benchmark for distance running performance.

The top men's middle-distance runners continued to compete in the mile run in the first half of the 1900s – Paavo Nurmi, Jack Lovelock and Sydney Wooderson were all world record holders over the distance. In the 1940s, Swedish runners Gunder Hägg and Arne Andersson pushed times into a new territory, as they set three world records each during their rivalry over the decade.

The goal of completing a sub-four-minute mile sparked further interest in the distance in the 1950s and to this day, many competitive runners are still chasing the ambitious barrier. Englishman Roger Bannister became the first person to achieve the feat in May 1954 and his effort, conducted with the help of Chris Brasher and Chris Chataway, was a key moment in the rise of the use of pacemakers at the top level of the sport – an aspect which is now commonplace at non-championship middle and long-distance races. In fact, pacemakers, if performing effectively, can earn generous sums of money for their performances and accurate pacing duties.

The 1960s saw American Jim Ryun set world records near the 3:50-minute mark and his achievements popularised interval workout techniques which are still heavily used today, especially for collegiate distance runners. Jim Ryun was the first person to run a sub-four minute mile in high school. From this period onwards, African runners began to emerge, breaking the largely white, Western dominance of the distance; Kenya's Kip Keino won the mile at the 1966 British Empire and Commonwealth Games (which was among the last mile races to be held at a major multi-sport event as of 2021).

Filbert Bayi of Tanzania became Africa's first world record holder over the distance in 1975, although New Zealander John Walker further broke Bayi's record a few months later to become the first man under 3:50 minutes for the event. The 1980s were highlighted by the rivalry between British runners Sebastian Coe and Steve Ovett, who improved the record five times between them, including two records at the Oslo Dream Mile race. Noureddine Morceli brought the mile record back into African hands in 1993 and Morocco's Hicham El Guerrouj set a world record of 3:43.13, which has stood from 1999 to 2026.

Mile run contests remain a key feature of many annual track and field meetings, including recreational, high school, and collegiate meets.

In the United States, particularly in many high school (NFHS) competitions, the 1600 meters is a substitute for the mile run.

On the professional level, races such as the Wanamaker Mile at the Millrose Games, the Dream Mile at the Bislett Games, the British Emsley Carr Mile, and the Bowerman Mile at the Prefontaine Classic are among the most prominent. Aside from track races, mile races are also occasionally contested in cross country running, and mile runs on the road include the Fifth Avenue Mile in New York City. However, in high school and collegiate cross country running, races are often measured in kilometers, with 5K and 8K being the most common.

In 2019, World Athletics President and former athlete Sebastian Coe organized the World Athletics Heritage Mile Night in Monaco, which brought together eleven mile world record holders, either indoors or outdoors: Ron Delany, Michel Jazy, Jim Ryun, Filbert Bayi, Paola Pigni-Cacchi, John Walker, Eamonn Coghlan, Coe, Steve Cram, Noureddine Morceli, and Hicham El Guerrouj. The event posthumously honored Roger Bannister and Diane Leather Charles, who were the first to break the four-minute and five-minute mile barriers, for men and women respectively.

In February 2025, it was announced that the mile run would be revived at the 2026 Commonwealth Games, replacing the 1500 metres.

In June 2025, in a special event organized by Nike, Faith Kipyegon attempted to become the first woman to break four minutes for the mile. She fell 6.91 seconds short with an unadjusted time of 4:06.91. Given the use of male pacemakers, the event was not record eligible.

== Records ==
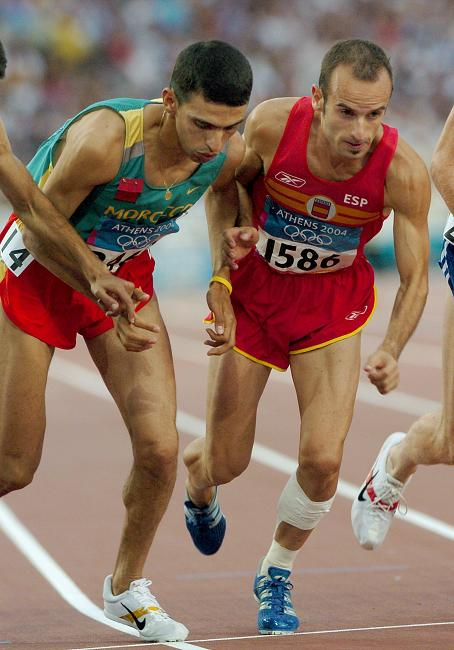
Morocco's Hicham El Guerrouj (left) was the world record holder for the outdoor mile from 1999 until 2026.

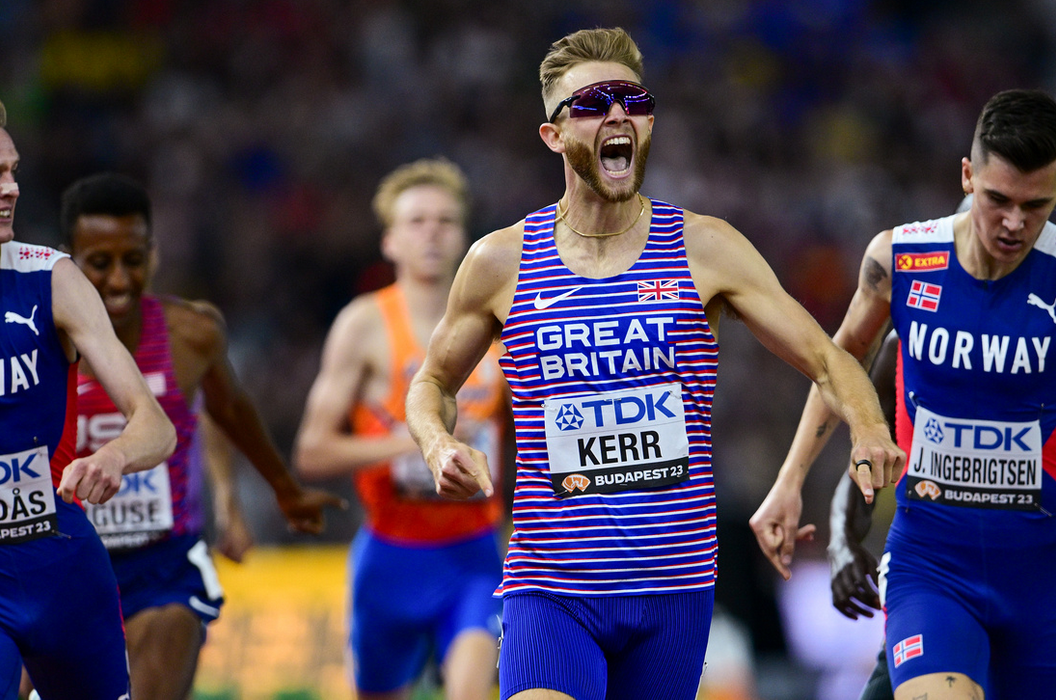
Josh Kerr is the current record holder.

=== Outdoor ===
- Updated 4 October 2026.

Area	Men			Women		
Area	Time	Season	Athlete	Time	Season	Athlete
World	3:42.66	2026	Josh Kerr (GBR)	4:07.64	2023	Faith Kipyegon (KEN)
Area records
Africa (records)	3:43.13	1999	Hicham El Guerrouj (MAR)	4:07.64	2023	Faith Kipyegon (KEN)
Asia (records)	3:47.97	2005	Daham Najim Bashir (QAT)	4:17.75	2007	Maryam Yusuf Jamal (BHR)
Europe (records)	3:42.66	2026	Josh Kerr (GBR)	4:12.33	2019	Sifan Hassan (NED)
North, Central America and Caribbean (records)	3:43.97	2023	Yared Nuguse (USA)	4:16.32	2025	Sinclaire Johnson (USA)
Oceania (records)	3:46.06	2026	Cameron Myers (AUS)	4:13.68	2025	Jessica Hull (AUS)
South America (records)	3:51.05	2005	Hudson de Souza (BRA)	4:26.13	2026	Carmen Alder Caisalitin (ECU)

=== Indoor ===
- Updated 20 May 2026.

Area	Men			Women		
Area	Time	Season	Athlete	Time	Season	Athlete
World	3:45.14	2025	Jakob Ingebrigtsen (NOR)	4:13.31	2016	Genzebe Dibaba (ETH)
Area records
Africa (records)	3:47.01	2019	Yomif Kejelcha (ETH)	4:13.31	2016	Genzebe Dibaba (ETH)
Asia (records)	3:54.72	2025	Kieran Tuntivate (THA)	4:24.71	2010	Maryam Yusuf Jamal (BHR)
Europe (records)	3:45.14	2025	Jakob Ingebrigtsen (NOR)	4:17.14	1990	Doina Melinte (ROU)
North, Central America and Caribbean (records)	3:45.94	2026	Cole Hocker (USA)	4:16.41	2024	Elle Purrier St. Pierre (USA)
Oceania (records)	3:47.48	2025	Cameron Myers (AUS)	4:19.03	2024	Jessica Hull (AUS)
South America (records)	3:56.26	2001	Hudson de Souza (BRA)	4:29.49	2025	Carmen Alder Caisalitin (ECU)

=== Road ===
- Updated 4 October 2026.

Area	Men			Women		
Area	Time	Season	Athlete	Time	Season	Athlete
World	3:51.3h	2024	Elliot Giles (GBR)	4:20.98	2023	Diribe Welteji (ETH)
Area records
Africa (records)	3:52.45	2025	Emmanuel Wanyonyi (KEN)	4:20.98	2023	Dirbe Welteji (ETH)
Asia (records)	4:01.26	2023	Ryoji Tatezawa (JPN)	4:29.79	2023	Nozomi Tanaka (JPN)
Europe (records)	3:51.3h	2024	Elliot Giles (GBR)	4:22.74	2026	Agathe Guillemot (FRA)
North, Central America and Caribbean (records)	3:51.9h	2024	Yared Nuguse (USA)	4:25.0h	2019	Ellinor Purrier (USA)
Oceania (records)	3:53.65	2026	Olli Hoare (AUS)	4:29.36	2026	Linden Hall (AUS)
South America (records)	3:56.0h	2006	Hudson de Souza (BRA)	none		
South America (records)	3:56.0h	2006	Leandro de Oliveira (BRA)	none		

== All-time top 25 ==
Tables show data for two definitions of "Top 25" – the top 25 mile times and the top 25 athletes:
– denotes top performance for athletes in the top 25 mile times
– denotes lesser performances, still in the top 25 mile times, by repeat athletes
– denotes top performance (only) for other top 25 athletes who fall outside the top 25 mile times

=== Men (outdoor) ===
- Correct as of 18 July 2026.

Ath.#	Perf.#	Time	Athlete	Nation	Date	Place	Ref.
1	1	3:42.66	Josh Kerr	Great Britain	18 July 2026	London	
2	2	3:43.13	Hicham El Guerrouj	Morocco	7 July 1999	Rome	
3	3	3:43.40	Noah Ngeny	Kenya	7 July 1999	Rome	
4	4	3:43.73	Jakob Ingebrigtsen	Norway	16 September 2023	Eugene	
5	5	3:43.97	Yared Nuguse	United States	16 September 2023	Eugene	
6	6	3:44.39	Noureddine Morceli	Algeria	5 September 1993	Rieti	
	7	3:44.60	El Guerrouj #2		16 July 1998	Nice	
	8	3:44.90	El Guerrouj #3		4 July 1997	Oslo	
	9	3:44.95	El Guerrouj #4		29 June 2001	Rome	
	10	3:45.19	Morceli #2		16 August 1995	Zürich	
	11	3:45.34	Kerr #2		25 May 2024	Eugene	
	12	3:45.60	Ingebrigtsen #2		25 May 2024	Eugene	
	13	3:45.64	El Guerrouj #5		26 August 1997	Berlin	
	14	3:45.69	Nuguse #2		18 July 2026	London	
7	15	3:45.94	Niels Laros	Netherlands	5 July 2025	Eugene	
	16	3:45.95	Nuguse #3		5 July 2025	Eugene	
	17	3:45.96	El Guerrouj #6		5 August 2000	London	
8	18	3:46.06	Cameron Myers	Australia	4 July 2026	Eugene	
	19	3:46.22	Nuguse #4		25 May 2024	Eugene	
	20	3:46.24	El Guerrouj #7		28 July 2000	Oslo	
9	21	3:46.32	Steve Cram	Great Britain	27 July 1985	Oslo	
10	22	3:46.38	Daniel Komen	Kenya	26 August 1997	Berlin	
	23	3:46.46	Ingebrigtsen #3		16 June 2022	Oslo	
	24	3:46.61	Nuguse #5		4 July 2026	Eugene	
11	25	3:46.65	Azeddine Habz	France	5 July 2025	Eugene	
12		3:46.70	Vénuste Niyongabo	Burundi	26 August 1997	Berlin	
13		3:46.73	Jake Heyward	Great Britain	18 July 2026	London	
14		3:46.76	Saïd Aouita	Morocco	2 July 1987	Helsinki	
15		3:46.82	Robert Farken	Germany	18 July 2026	London	
16		3:46.91	Alan Webb	United States	21 July 2007	Brasschaat	
17		3:46.97	Ethan Strand	United States	4 July 2026	Eugene	
18		3:47.28	Bernard Lagat	Kenya	29 June 2001	Rome	
19		3:47.32	Ayanleh Souleiman	Djibouti	31 May 2014	Eugene	
20		3:47.33	Sebastian Coe	Great Britain	28 August 1981	Brussels	
21		3:47.38	Hobbs Kessler	United States	4 July 2026	Eugene	
22		3:47.39	Timothy Cheruiyot	Kenya	4 July 2026	Eugene	
23		3:47.43	Cole Hocker	United States	5 July 2025	Eugene	
24		3:47.46	Reynold Cheruiyot	Kenya	5 July 2025	Eugene	
25		3:47.48	Oliver Hoare	Australia	16 June 2022	Oslo	

=== Women (outdoor) ===
- Correct as of July 2025.

Ath.#	Perf.#	Time	Athlete	Nation	Date	Place	Ref.
1	1	4:07.64	Faith Kipyegon	Kenya	21 July 2023	Monaco	
2	2	4:11.88	Gudaf Tsegay	Ethiopia	19 July 2025	London	
3	3	4:12.33	Sifan Hassan	Netherlands	12 July 2019	Monaco	
4	4	4:12.56	Svetlana Masterkova	Russia	14 August 1996	Zürich	
5	5	4:13.68	Jessica Hull	Australia	19 July 2025	London	
6	6	4:14.30	Genzebe Dibaba	Ethiopia	6 September 2016	Rovereto	
7	7	4:14.58	Ciara Mageean	Ireland	21 July 2023	Monaco	
	8	4:14.71	Hassan #2		22 July 2018	London	
	9	4:14.74	Hassan #3		3 September 2021	Brussels	
8	10	4:14.79	Freweyni Hailu	Ethiopia	21 July 2023	Monaco	
9	11	4:15.24	Laura Muir	Great Britain	21 July 2023	Monaco	
	12	4:15.34	Hull #2		21 July 2023	Monaco	
10	13	4:15.61	Paula Ivan	Romania	10 July 1989	Nice	
11	14	4:15.8h	Natalya Artyomova	Soviet Union	5 August 1984	Leningrad	
	15	4:16.05	Dibaba #2		6 July 2017	Lausanne	
	16	4:16.14	Tsegay #2		22 July 2018	London	
12	17	4:16.15	Hellen Obiri	Kenya	22 July 2018	London	
13	18	4:16.26	Sarah Healy	Ireland	19 July 2025	London	
14	19	4:16.32	Sinclaire Johnson	United States	19 July 2025	London	
15	20	4:16.35	Nikki Hiltz	United States	21 July 2023	Monaco	
16	21	4:16.38	Melissa Courtney-Bryant	Great Britain	21 July 2023	Monaco	
17	22	4:16.47	Elise Cranny	United States	21 July 2023	Monaco	
	23	4:16.56	Obiri #2		9 July 2017	London	
18	24	4:16.71	Mary Slaney	United States	21 August 1985	Zürich	
	25	4:16.71	Kipyegon #2		11 September 2015	Brussels	
19		4:17.13	Birke Haylom	Ethiopia	15 June 2023	Oslo	
20		4:17.16	Marta Zenoni	Italy	19 July 2025	London	
21		4:17.25	Sonia O'Sullivan	Ireland	22 July 1994	Oslo	
22		4:17.30	Jenny Simpson	United States	22 July 2018	London	
23		4:17.33	Maricica Puica	Romania	21 August 1985	Zürich	
24		4:17.57	Zola Budd	Great Britain	21 August 1985	Zürich	
25		4:17.60	Laura Weightman	Great Britain	12 July 2019	Monaco	

Notes

- Faith Kipyegon (Kenya) ran a time of 4:06.42 during an exhibition run put on by Nike on 26 June 2025 at Stade Charléty in Paris. Nike researchers contrived a complex arrangement of eleven pacers to shield her from the wind and reduce aerodynamic drag, and the clock started when she started running and not when the gun officially started the race. Strict regulations governing everything from shoes to pacers meant that the run was not eligible for official world records.

=== Men (indoor) ===
- Correct as of 14 February 2026.

Ath.#	Perf.#	Time	Athlete	Nation	Date	Place	Ref.
1	1	3:45.14	Jakob Ingebrigtsen	Norway	13 February 2025	Liévin	
2	2	3:45.94	Cole Hocker	United States	14 February 2026	Winston-Salem	
3	3	3:46.63	Yared Nuguse	United States	8 February 2025	New York City	
4	4	3:46.90	Hobbs Kessler	United States	8 February 2025	New York City	
5	5	3:47.01	Yomif Kejelcha	Ethiopia	3 March 2019	Boston	
	6	3:47.22	Nuguse #2		2 March 2025	Boston	
	7	3:47.38	Nuguse #3		11 February 2023	New York City	
6	8	3:47.48	Cameron Myers	Australia	8 February 2025	New York City	
7	9	3:47.56	Azeddine Habz	France	8 February 2025	New York City	
	10	3:47.57	Myers #2		1 February 2026	New York City	
	11	3:47.83	Nuguse #4		11 February 2024	New York City	
	12	3:48.31	Nuguse #5		1 February 2026	New York City	
8	13	3:48.32	Ethan Strand	United States	1 February 2025	Boston	
9	14	3:48.45	Hicham El Guerrouj	Morocco	12 February 1997	Ghent	
	15	3:48.46	Kejelcha #2		9 February 2019	New York City	
	16	3:48.66	Kessler #2		11 February 2024	New York City	
	17	3:48.68	Kessler #3		1 February 2026	New York City	
10	18	3:48.72	Nico Young	United States	1 February 2026	New York City	
11	19	3:48.82	Gary Martin	United States	8 February 2025	New York City	
12	20	3:48.87	Josh Kerr	Great Britain	27 February 2022	Boston	
13	21	3:48.88	Sam Ruthe	New Zealand	31 January 2026	Boston	
14	22	3:48.93	George Mills	Great Britain	11 February 2024	New York City	
15	23	3:49.22	Neil Gourley	United Kingdom	8 February 2025	New York City	
16	24	3:49.26	Andrew Coscoran	Ireland	8 February 2025	New York City	
17	25	3:49.44	Edward Cheserek	Kenya	9 February 2018	Boston	
18		3:49.45	Robert Farken	Germany	1 February 2025	Boston	
19		3:49.62	Adam Fogg	Great Britain	11 February 2024	New York City	
20		3:49.78	Eamonn Coghlan	Ireland	27 February 1983	East Rutherford	
21		3:49.89	Bernard Lagat	Kenya	11 February 2005	Fayetteville	
22		3:49.98	Johnny Gregorek	United States	3 March 2019	Boston	
23		3:50.17	Cooper Teare	United States	11 February 2022	Chicago	
24		3:50.31	Pieter Sisk	Belgium	31 January 2026	Boston	
25		3:50.45	Amos Bartelsmeyer	Germany	11 February 2023	Boston	

=== Women (indoor) ===
- Correct as of February 2026.

Ath.#	Perf.#	Time	Athlete	Nation	Date	Place	Ref.
1	1	4:13.31	Genzebe Dibaba	Ethiopia	17 February 2016	Stockholm	
2	2	4:16.16	Gudaf Tsegay	Ethiopia	8 February 2023	Toruń	
3	3	4:16.41	Elinor Purrier	United States	11 February 2024	New York City	
	4	4:16.85	Purrier #2		8 February 2020	New York City	
4	5	4:17.01	Heather MacLean	United States	2 March 2025	Boston	
5	6	4:17.14	Doina Melinte	Romania	9 February 1990	East Rutherford	
6	7	4:17.26	Konstanze Klosterhalfen	Germany	8 February 2020	New York City	
7	8	4:17.36	Freweyni Hailu	Ethiopia	30 January 2024	Ostrava	
	9	4:17.83	Purrier #3		14 February 2026	Boston	
8	10	4:17.88	Jemma Reekie	Great Britain	8 February 2020	New York City	
9	11	4:18.75	Laura Muir	Great Britain	16 February 2019	Birmingham	
	12	4:18.86	Melinte #2		13 February 1988	East Rutherford	
10	13	4:18.99	Paula Ivan	Romania	10 February 1989	East Rutherford	
11	14	4:19.03	Jessica Hull	Australia	11 February 2024	New York City	
	15	4:19.30	Purrier #4		29 January 2022	New York City	
12	16	4:19.53	Hirut Meshesha	Ethiopia	30 January 2024	Ostrava	
13	17	4:19.64	Nikki Hiltz	United States	1 February 2026	New York City	
14	18	4:19.73	Gabriela DeBues-Stafford	Canada	8 February 2020	New York City	
15	19	4:19.89	Sifan Hassan	Netherlands	11 February 2017	New York City	
	20	4:19.98	Klosterhalfen #2		9 February 2019	New York City	
	21	4:20.11	Hull #2		1 February 2026	New York City	
	22	4:20.15	Muir #2		11 February 2023	New York City	
16	23	4:20.30	Shelby Houlihan	United States	8 February 2025	Boston	
17	24	4:20.5h	Mary Decker-Tabb	United States	19 February 1982	San Diego	
18	25	4:20.61	Susan Lokayo Ejore	Kenya	11 February 2024	New York City	
18	25	4:20.61	Riley Chamberlain	United States	14 February 2026	Boston	
20		4:20.81	Josette Norris	United States	29 January 2022	New York City	
21		4:20.83	Elise Cranny	United States	31 January 2025	Boston	
22		4:21.04	Wilma Nielsen	Sweden	14 February 2026	Boston	
23		4:21.19	Katie Snowden	Great Britain	11 February 2023	New York City	
24		4:21.36	Klaudia Kazimierska	Poland	1 February 2026	New York City	
25		4:21.45	Linden Hall	Australia	1 February 2026	New York City	

=== Men (road) ===
Note: World Athletics only accepts times achieved on World Athletics certified courses that are conducted according to World Athletics rules. The elevation gradient must not exceed one meter per kilometer. For instance, the famous Fifth Avenue Mile in New York City, or New Zealand's Queen Street Golden Mile, are too steep to be record eligible by World Athletics. Downhill miles such as Craig Wheeler's 3:24 clocking in the 1993 Meltham Mile and Mike Boit's 3:28 in the 1983 Queen Street Mile, were achieved on ineligible courses and as such are not recognized by World Athletics. The road mile became an official world record event on 1 September 2023 which is why most performances prior to this date were not previously considered records. The winning times from the 2023 U.S. Road Mile Championships, on 25 April, were ratified by World Athletics as the inaugural road mile world records.

- Correct as of September 2026.

Ath.#	Perf.#	Time	Athlete	Nation	Date	Place	Ref.
–	–	3:45.0 a	Marco Langon	United States	13 September 2026	New York City	
1	1	3:51.3 h	Elliot Giles	Great Britain	1 September 2024	Düsseldorf	
2	2	3:51.80	Robert Farken	Germany	19 September 2026	Copenhagen	
3	3	3:51.9 h	Yared Nuguse	United States	1 September 2024	Düsseldorf	
	4	3:52.33	Nuguse #2		19 September 2026	Copenhagen	
4	5	3:52.45	Emmanuel Wanyonyi	Kenya	26 April 2025	Herzogenaurach	
5	6	3:52.77	Ruben Querinjean	Luxembourg	19 September 2026	Copenhagen	
6	7	3:52.83	Marco Langon	United States	6 September 2026	Düsseldorf	
7	8	3:53.28	Anass Essayi	Morocco	19 September 2026	Copenhagen	
8	9	3:53.3 h	Edward Cheserek	Kenya	7 December 2019	Honolulu	
9	10	3:53.44	Flavien Szot	France	19 September 2026	Copenhagen	
10	11	3:53.65	Oli Hoare	Australia	19 September 2026	Copenhagen	
11	12	3:53.8 h	John Walker	New Zealand	18 December 1982	Whanganui	
12	13	3:53.83	Adam Spencer	Australia	6 September 2026	Düsseldorf	
13	14	3:54.12	Jude Thomas	Australia	6 September 2026	Düsseldorf	
14	15	3:54.34	Hobbs Kessler	United States	26 April 2025	Herzogenaurach	
15	16	3:54.37	Pietro Arese	Italy	19 September 2026	Copenhagen	
16	17	3:54.50	Nico Young	United States	26 April 2025	Herzogenaurach	
17	18	3:54.6 h	Tony Rogers	New Zealand	18 December 1982	Whanganui	
	19	3:54.6 h	Wanyonyi #2		27 April 2024	Herzogenaurach	
18	20	3:54.62	Vincent Ciattei	United States	19 September 2026	Copenhagen	
19	21	3:54.73	Samuel Prakel	United States	6 September 2026	Düsseldorf	
	22	3:54.8 h	Ciattei #2		7 September 2025	Düsseldorf	
	23	3:54.83	Cheserek #2		8 December 2018	Honolulu	
20	24	3:54.89	Leonard Kipkemoi Bett	Kenya	8 December 2018	Honolulu	
21	25	3:54.9 h	Vincent Kibet Keter	Kenya	1 September 2024	Düsseldorf	
22		3:55.0 h	Jordan McNamara	United States	21 September 2014	Lahaina	
23		3:55.0 h	Sam Ellis	United States	22 April 2025	Des Moines	
24		3:55.15	Josh Hoey	United States	13 December 2025	Honolulu	
25		3:55.33	Cathal Doyle	Ireland	6 September 2026	Düsseldorf	

=== Women (road) ===
Note: World Athletics only accepts times achieved on World Athletics certified courses that are conducted according to World Athletics rules. The elevation gradient must not exceed one meter per kilometer. For instance, the famous Fifth Avenue Mile, or New Zealand's Queen Street Golden Mile, are too steep to be record eligible by World Athletics. Downhill miles are achieved on ineligible courses and as such are not recognized by World Athletics. The road mile became an official world record event on 1 September 2023 which is why performances prior to this date were not previously considered records. The winning times from the 2023 U.S. Road Mile Championships, on 25 April, were ratified by World Athletics as the inaugural road mile world records.

- Correct as of September 2026.

Ath.#	Perf.#	Time	Athlete	Nation	Date	Place	Ref.
–	–	4:13.8 a	Jemma Reekie	Great Britain	13 September 2026	New York City	
1	1	4:20.98	Diribe Welteji	Ethiopia	1 October 2023	Riga	
2	2	4:21.66	Sinclaire Johnson	United States	13 December 2025	Honolulu	
3	3	4:22.54	Mirriam Cherop	Kenya	8 December 2018	Honolulu	
4	4	4:22.74	Agathe Guillemot	France	19 September 2026	Copenhagen	
5	5	4:23.06	Freweyni Hailu	Ethiopia	1 October 2023	Riga	
6	6	4:23.25	Jemma Reekie	Great Britain	6 September 2026	Düsseldorf	
7	7	4:23.98	Krissy Gear	United States	22 April 2025	Des Moines	
8	8	4:23.99	Nelly Chepchirchir	Kenya	26 April 2025	Herzogenaurach	
9	9	4:24.13	Faith Kipyegon	Kenya	1 October 2023	Riga	
	10	4:24.35	Hailu #2		19 September 2026	Copenhagen	
10	11	4:24.40	Karissa Schweizer	United States	22 April 2025	Des Moines	
	12	4:24.7 h	Cherop #2		9 December 2017	Honolulu	
11	13	4:24.73	Gracie Morris	United States	22 April 2025	Des Moines	
12	14	4:24.81	Nikki Hiltz	United States	13 December 2025	Honolulu	
13	15	4:25.0 h	Elle St. Pierre	United States	7 December 2019	Honolulu	
14	16	4:25.06	Shelby Houlihan	United States	22 April 2025	Des Moines	
15	17	4:25.7 h	Shannon Osika	United States	7 December 2019	Honolulu	
	18	4:25.71	Cherop #2		19 September 2026	Copenhagen	
16	19	4:26.10	Gracie Hyde	United States	6 September 2026	Düsseldorf	
17	20	4:26.69	Susan Lokayo Ejore	Kenya	13 December 2025	Honolulu	
18	21	4:26.78	Annemarie Nissen	Denmark	19 September 2026	Copenhagen	
19	22	4:26.83	Hawi Abera	Ethiopia	26 April 2025	Herzogenaurach	
	23	4:27.0 h	Johnson #2		23 July 2021	Pittsburgh	
	24	4:26.10	Morris #2		6 September 2026	Düsseldorf	
20	25	4:27.4 h	Katrina Coogan	United States	9 December 2017	Honolulu	
21		4:28.0 h	Leah Pells	Canada	13 December 1997	Honolulu	
22		4:28.00	Genzebe Dibaba	Ethiopia	20 July 2014	London	
23		4:28.0 h	Emily Lipari	United States	22 July 2022	Pittsburgh	
24		4:28.0 h	Eleanor Fulton	United States	22 April 2025	Des Moines	
25		4:28.68	Weini Kelati Frezghi	United States	7 December 2024	Honolulu	

== Youth age records ==
Key: Incomplete information

=== Boys ===
Age	Time	Athlete	Nation	Birthdate	Date	Place	Ref.
5	6:33.3	Daniel Skandera	United States	2 November 2007	23 July 2013	Santa Rosa	
6	5:44.4	Daniel Skandera	United States	2 November 2007	5 August 2014	Santa Rosa	
7	5:20.3	Daniel Skandera	United States	2 November 2007	9 June 2015	Santa Rosa	
8	5:12.1	Daniel Skandera	United States	2 November 2007	9 August 2016	Santa Rosa	
9	5:02.5	Daniel Skandera	United States	2 November 2007	27 June 2017	Santa Rosa	
10	4:46.6	Daniel Skandera	United States	2 November 2007	24 July 2018	Santa Rosa	
11	4:36.04	Archie Sideridis	Australia	18 October 2011	9 February 2023	Melbourne	
12	4:35.66	Quenton Lanese	United States	4 March 2011	20 May 2023	Mercer Island	
13	4:22.33	Jackson Miller	United States	11 June 1999	1 June 2023	St. Louis	
14	4:11.20	Angus Wilkinson	Great Britain	16 January 2009	26 August 2023	Stirling	
15	3:58.35	Sam Ruthe	New Zealand	12 April 2009	19 March 2025	Auckland	
16	3:48.88 i	Sam Ruthe	New Zealand	12 April 2009	31 January 2026	Boston	
17	3:50.15	Cameron Myers	Australia	9 June 2006	25 May 2024	Eugene	
18	3:47.48 i	Cameron Myers	Australia	9 June 2006	8 February 2025	New York City	
19	3:48.06	Reynold Cheruiyot	Kenya	30 July 2004	16 September 2023	Eugene	

=== Girls ===
Age	Time	Athlete	Nation	Birthdate	Date	Place	Ref.
6	6:36.0	Celine Struijvé	Netherlands	10 November 2012	17 September 2019	Epe	
7	6:05.1	Kristina Wilson	United States	5 December 1963	5 June 1971		
8	5:43.5	Imogen Stewart	Australia	27 July 2005	10 December 2013	Sydney	
9	5:18.74	Imogen Stewart	Australia	27 July 2005	17 January 2015	Wollongong	
10	5:04.19	Imogen Stewart	Australia	27 July 2005	16 January 2016	Wollongong	
11	4:56.08	Imogen Stewart	Australia	27 July 2005	4 March 2017	Sydney	
12	4:46.57	Imogen Stewart	Australia	27 July 2005	13 January 2018	Wollongong	
13	4:44.73	Imogen Stewart	Australia	27 July 2005	22 December 2018	Sydney	
14	4:40.1 i	Mary Decker	United States	4 August 1958	16 March 1973	Richmond	
15	4:35.16	Sadie Engelhardt	United States	21 August 2006	9 April 2022	Arcadia	
16	4:28.25 i	Mary Cain	United States	3 May 1996	16 February 2013	New York City	
17	4:24.11 i	Mary Cain	United States	3 May 1996	24 January 2014	Boston	
18	4:23.50	Jane Hedengren	United States	23 September 2006	5 June 2025	St. Louis	
19	4:17.57	Zola Budd	Great Britain	26 May 1966	21 August 1985	Zürich	

== World leading times ==
=== Men ===
Year	Time	Athlete	Place
1960	3:57.0 h	Herb Elliott (AUS)	Dublin
1961	3:57.6 h	Dyrol Burleson (USA)	Eugene
1962	3:54.4 h	Peter Snell (NZL)	Wanganui
1963	3:54.9 h	Peter Snell (NZL)	Modesto
1964	3:54.04	Peter Snell (NZL)	Auckland
1965	3:53.6 h	Michel Jazy (FRA)	Rennes
1966	3:51.3 h	Jim Ryun (USA)	Berkeley
1967	3:51.1 h	Jim Ryun (USA)	Bakersfield
1968	3:53.8 h	Bodo Tümmler (FRG)	Karlskrona
1969	3:55.9 h	Jim Ryun (USA)	Los Angeles
1970	3:56.3 h	Roscoe Divine (USA)	Eugene
1971	3:54.4 h	Kipchoge Keino (KEN)	Stockholm
1972	3:52.8 h	Jim Ryun (USA)	Toronto
1973	3:52.17	Benjamin Jipcho (KEN)	Stockholm
1974	3:53.2 h	Tony Waldrop (USA)	Philadelphia
1975	3:49.4 h	John Walker (NZL)	Gothenburg
1976	3:53.07	John Walker (NZL)	Stockholm
1977	3:52.0 h	John Walker (NZL)	Dublin
1978	3:52.50	Thomas Wessinghage (FRG)	Stockholm
1979	3:48.95	Sebastian Coe (GBR)	Oslo
1980	3:48.8 h	Steve Ovett (GBR)	Oslo
1981	3:47.33	Sebastian Coe (GBR)	Brussels
1982	3:47.69	Steve Scott (USA)	Oslo
1983	3:49.21	Steve Scott (USA)	Berlin
1984	3:49.54	Saïd Aouita (MAR)	Zurich
1985	3:46.32	Steve Cram (GBR)	Oslo
1986	3:48.31	Steve Cram (GBR)	Oslo
1987	3:46.76	Saïd Aouita (MAR)	Helsinki
1988	3:48.85	Steve Cram (GBR)	Oslo
1989	3:49.90	Abdi Bile (SOM)	Oslo
1990	3:49.31	Joe Falcon (USA)	Oslo
1991	3:49.12	Noureddine Morceli (ALG)	Lausanne
1992	3:48.80	William Kemei (KEN)	Berlin
1993	3:44.39	Noureddine Morceli (ALG)	Rieti
1994	3:48.67	Noureddine Morceli (ALG)	Saint Petersburg
1995	3:45.19	Noureddine Morceli (ALG)	Zurich
1996	3:48.15	Noureddine Morceli (ALG)	Oslo
1997	3:44.90	Hicham El Guerrouj (MAR)	Oslo
1998	3:44.60	Hicham El Guerrouj (MAR)	Nice
1999	3:43.13	Hicham El Guerrouj (MAR)	Rome
2000	3:45.96	Hicham El Guerrouj (MAR)	London
2001	3:44.95	Hicham El Guerrouj (MAR)	Rome
2002	3:48.28	Hicham El Guerrouj (MAR)	Rome
2003	3:48.17	Paul Korir (KEN)	London
2004	3:49.84	Paul Korir (KEN)	London
2005	3:47.97	Daham Najim Bashir (QAT)	Oslo
2006	3:50.32	Alex Kipchirchir (KEN)	Oslo
2007	3:46.91	Alan Webb (USA)	Brasschaat
2008	3:49.38	Andrew Baddeley (GBR)	Oslo
2009	3:48.50	Asbel Kiprop (KEN)	Eugene
2010	3:49.56	Asbel Kiprop (KEN)	Oslo
2011	3:49.09	Haron Keitany (KEN)	Eugene
2012	3:49.22	Asbel Kiprop (KEN)	Oslo
2013	3:49.48	Silas Kiplagat (KEN)	Eugene
2014	3:47.32	Ayanleh Souleiman (DJI)	Eugene
2015	3:51.10	Ayanleh Souleiman (DJI)	Eugene
2016	3:50.63 i	Matthew Centrowitz (USA)	New York City
2017	3:49.04	Ronald Kwemoi (KEN)	Eugene
2018	3:49.44 i	Edward Cheserek (KEN)	Boston
2019	3:47.01 i	Yomif Kejelcha (ETH)	Boston
2020	3:51.23	Matthew Ramsden (AUS)	Milan
2021	3:47.24	Jakob Ingebrigtsen (NOR)	Eugene
2022	3:46.46	Jakob Ingebrigtsen (NOR)	Oslo
2023	3:43.73	Jakob Ingebrigtsen (NOR)	Eugene
2024	3:45.34	Josh Kerr (GBR)	Eugene
2025	3:45.14 i	Jakob Ingebrigtsen (NOR)	Liévin
2026	3:42.66	Josh Kerr (GBR)	London

=== Women ===
Year	Time	Athlete	Place
1977	4:23.8 h	Natalia Mărăşescu (ROU)	Bucharest
1978	4:26.90	Grete Waitz (NOR)	Gateshead
1979	4:22.09	Natalia Mărăşescu (ROU)	Auckland
1980	4:17.55	Mary Decker (USA)	Houston
1981	4:20.89	Lyudmila Veselkova (URS)	Bologna
1982	4:17.44	Maricica Puică (ROU)	Rieti
1983	4:19.18	Mary Decker (USA)	Oslo
1984	4:15.8 h	Natalya Artyomova (URS)	Leningrad
1985	4:16.71	Mary Slaney (USA)	Zurich
1986	4:18.25	Maricica Puică (ROU)	Nice
1987	4:24.05	Doina Melinte (ROU)	Brussels
1988	4:18.86	Doina Melinte (ROU)	East Rutherford
1989	4:15.61	Paula Ivan (ROU)	Nice
1990	4:17.14 i	Doina Melinte (ROU)	East Rutherford
1991	4:17.00	Natalya Artyomova (URS)	Barcelona
1992	4:21.30	Lyudmila Rogachova (RUS)	Lausanne
1993	4:21.69	Violeta Beclea-Szekely (ROU)	Rome
1994	4:17.25	Sonia O'Sullivan (IRL)	Oslo
1995	4:24.13	Sonia O'Sullivan (IRL)	Cologne
1996	4:12.56	Svetlana Masterkova (RUS)	Zurich
1997	4:24.53	Jackline Maranga (KEN)	Bellinzona
1998	4:19.30	Gabriela Szabo (ROU)	Bellinzona
1999	4:23.44	Violeta Beclea-Szekely (ROU)	Nice
2000	4:21.79 i	Regina Jacobs (USA)	New York City
2001	4:23.19 i	Gabriela Szabo (ROU)	Stuttgart
2002	4:23.00 i	Carla Sacramento (POR)	Liévin
2003	4:24.40	Natalya Yevdokimova (RUS)	Heusden-Zolder
2004	4:21.57	Yelena Zadorozhnaya (RUS)	Tula
2005	4:28.29	Yelena Kanales (RUS)	Tula
2006	4:27.96	Carrie Tollefson (USA)	Falmouth
2007	4:17.75	Maryam Yusuf Jamal (BHR)	Brussels
2008	4:18.23	Gelete Burka (ETH)	Rieti
2009	4:25.91 i	Jenny Simpson (USA)	College Station
2010	4:23.53 i	Gelete Burka (ETH)	Birmingham
2011	4:28.60 i	Jenny Simpson (USA)	New York City
2012	4:26.76	Brenda Martinez (USA)	Falmouth
2013	4:27.02 i	Sheila Reid (CAN)	New York City
2014	4:24.11 i	Mary Cain (USA)	Boston
2015	4:16.71	Faith Kipyegon (KEN)	Brussels
2016	4:13.31 i	Genzebe Dibaba (ETH)	Stockholm
2017	4:16.05	Genzebe Dibaba (ETH)	Lausanne
2018	4:14.71	Sifan Hassan (NED)	London
2019	4:12.33	Sifan Hassan (NED)	Monaco
2020	4:16.81 i	Elinor Purrier (USA)	Boston
2021	4:14.74	Sifan Hassan (NED)	Brussels
2022	4:19.30 i	Elinor Purrier St. Pierre (USA)	New York City
2023	4:07.64	Faith Kipyegon (KEN)	Monaco
2024	4:16.41 i	Elinor Purrier St. Pierre (USA)	New York City
2025	4:11.88	Gudaf Tsegay (ETH)	London
2026	4:17.49	Nikki Hiltz (USA)	Eugene

== See also ==
- 1500 metres
- 1600 meters
- 2 miles
