= Ken Wood (athlete) =

British runner (1930–2008)

Personal information
- Born: 21 November 1930
- Died: 8 September 2008 (aged 77) Sheffield, England
- Height: 1.78 m (5 ft 10 in)
- Weight: 67 kg (148 lb)

Sport
- Sport: Athletics
- Event: Middle-distance running
- Club: Sheffield United Harriers

Kenneth Wood (21 November 1930 – 8 September 2008) was a British middle-distance runner. He ran one of the early Four-minute mile runs and competed at the 1956 Summer Olympics.

== Biography ==
Wood competed with the Sheffield United Harriers athletic club. Between 1954 and 1961 he won the Emsley Carr Mile a record four times. In this period he was selected to run for Great Britain in the 1956 Olympic 1500 metres finishing ninth in the final.

Wood became the British 1 mile champion after winning the British AAA Championships title at the 1956 AAA Championships and 1959 AAA Championships.

In May 1955 Wood finished second in a two-mile race behind Sándor Iharos both breaking the world two mile outdoor record. Woods time being 8:34.8.

He became the fourteenth athlete (the fifth from the UK) to officially run a Four-minute mile, achieving a time of 3:59.3 on 19 July 1957. He in fact finished fourth behind Derek Ibbotson, who set a new British record, Ron Delany and Stanislav Jungwirth.

On the 50th anniversary of Roger Bannister's first Four-minute mile, Wood claimed he had previously run under four minutes on 7 April 1954. This unofficial run being timed by explorer and then Sheffield University student Roy Koerner.

Wood died in September 2008.

== Record ==
Year	Competition	Venue	Position	Event	Notes
1954	Emsley Carr Mile	White City Stadium, London	1st	Mile	4:04.8
1955	Emsley Carr Mile	White City Stadium, London	1st	Mile	4:05.4
May 1955	Athletics Meeting	London	2nd	Two miles	8:34.8 (Won by Sándor Iharos (8:33.4) )
1956	AAA Championships	White City Stadium, London	1st	Mile	4:06.8
Dec 1956	Athletics at the 1956 Summer Olympics	Melbourne, Australia	9th	1500m	3:46:6 (Won by Ron Delany (3:41.49) )
July 1957	Athletics Meeting	White City Stadium, London	4th	Mile	3:59.3 (Won by Derek Ibbotson (3:57.2) )
1957	Emsley Carr Mile	White City Stadium, London	1st	Mile	4:02.0
1959	AAA Championships	White City Stadium, London	1st	Mile	4:08.1
1961	Emsley Carr Mile	White City Stadium, London	1st	Mile	4:08.4
