= James Nuttall =

James Nuttall may refer to:

- James Nuttall (runner) (1840–1907), British runner
- Jimmy Nuttall (1899–1945), English Footballer
- James W. Nuttall (born 1953), United States Army general
