= William Lang (British athlete) =

Personal information
- Born: December 1837 Stockton-on-Tees
- Height: 5 ft 8.5 in (174 cm)
- Weight: 10 st 3.25 lb (143 lb; 65 kg)

William Lang (born in December 1837) was a professional British runner, who set world records in numerous running events in the 1860s, including a mile record which stood for 16 years.

In the 1850s and 1860s, with the advent of accurate timing devices and precisely measured running courses, the sport of running, called "pedestrianism", became extremely popular, especially in Britain.

On 19 August 1865, the greatest field of milers ever assembled to that time raced at the Royal Oak Grounds in Manchester for the Mile Championship Cup, £30, and title of "Champion Miler of the World." Included in the field of nine professionals were Siah Albison, who had set a mile record at the same location in 1860 at 4:22 1/4, Lang who had broken Albison's record in 1863, and Edward Mills, the current record holder in the event at 4:20, set on 25 June 1864 also at Manchester.

Lang was nicknamed the "Crowcatcher" and had set records in the two mile and six mile events in 1863. He had also run the mile in 4:21 3/4 that year and was eager to win this race.

A crowd of 15,000 watched the race, which also included Scot Robert McInstray, world-record holder in the 880-yard race, 4:21 1/2 miler James Sanderson, the Welsh mile champion William Richards and half-miler rabbit James Nuttall. As bets were being placed, word came through that Mills was limping and would not be able to compete, meaning that Lang was now the clear favourite.

Nuttall led the field around the 651-yard track and hit the quarter-mile mark in 60 seconds, an unsustainable pace. The crowd cheered, and excitement built as Nuttall hit the half in 2:05 1/2. Nuttall started to fade, and Lang took over the lead and at the 3/4 mile point with a time of 3:14, which the crowd realized was fast enough to make this the first-ever mile run under 4:20.

As Lang headed into the backstretch, he tried to pull away, but McInstray kept pace as did the previously unheralded Richards. Albion had faded badly and was no longer a factor. As the three came onto the homestretch, the crowd roared, and McInstray lost ground. Richards, on the other hand, gained on Lang. At the finish, Richards pulled even and he and Lang crossed the line together. Though Lang's supporters howled with rage, the judges ruled the race a tie.

Their time was 4:17 1/4, a time not surpassed until William Cummings ran 4:16 1/5 16 years later.

Because the public was not satisfied with a tie, a run-off was held a week later, and Lang beat Richards in 4:22.

On 30 October 1863, Lang ran a downhill mile time trial in 4:02 in Newmarket. Despite the first half mile being "very level", Lang's opening quarter splits of 55 and 59 seconds were his fastest, followed by a 62 second third quarter. Due to the downhill slope, the time would not have been valid for record-keeping but nonetheless would be the fastest mile ever run until 1943.

Lang was from Manchester and he was trained by Billy Fish of Royton, a noted trainer at the time.
