= Dream Mile =

Annual race league

The Dream Mile may refer to the annual Diamond League race in Oslo at Bislett Stadium, or several historic individual races featuring top middle-distance runners.

== Dream Mile (Bislett) ==
Bislett Dream Mile
- Location: Bislett Stadium; Oslo, Norway
- Event type: Track and field
- Distance: One Mile (1,609.344 meters)
- Organizer: Bislett Games
- Course records: Men: (Morocco) Hicham El Guerrouj 3:44.90 (1997); Women: (Ethiopia) Birke Haylom 4:17.13 (2023)

The Dream Mile is an annual mile race run at Bislett Stadium, Oslo as part of the Bislett Games, one of the meetings of the Diamond League athletics competition. This annual event was interrupted in 2004 for the rebuilding of Bislett Stadium, replacing a six-lane track with sharp bends and steep terraces with a conventional eight-lane track and seating. In 1980, the world mile record was set in this race by Steve Ovett, and in 1985 Steve Cram also set a new world mile record.

Numerous National records were set in the Bislett Dream Mile, including current records: Great Britain (Steve Cram), Spain (José Luis González), Qatar (Daham Najim Bashir), Australia (Craig Mottram), New Zealand (John Walker), Germany (Jens-Peter Herold), Somalia (Abdi Bile), Portugal (Isaac Nader), Ireland (Ray Flynn), Canada (Kevin Sullivan), Brazil (Hudson de Souza) and Saudi Arabia (Mohammed Shaween). The 2017 race was held as an under-20s competition.

Annual Men's Dream Mile Champions

Year	Athlete	Country	Time
2025	Isaac Nader	Portugal	3:48.25
2024	Mile Not Held (Meet Had 1500m)		
2023	Mile Not Held (Meet Had 1500m)		
2022	Jakob Ingebrigtsen	Norway	3:46.46
2021	Stewart McSweyn	Australia	3:48.37
2020	Meet Not Held (COVID-19 Pandemic)		
2019	Marcin Lewandowski	Poland	3:52.34
2018	Elijah Manangoi	Kenya	3:56.95
2017	Jakob Ingebrigtsen	Norway	3:56.29
2016	Asbel Kiprop	Kenya	3:51.48
2015	Asbel Kiprop	Kenya	3:51.45
2014	Ayanleh Souleiman	Djibouti	3:49.49
2013	Ayanleh Souleiman	Djibouti	3:50.53
2012	Asbel Kiprop	Kenya	3:49.22
2011	Asbel Kiprop	Kenya	3:50.86
2010	Asbel Kiprop	Kenya	3:49.56
2009	Deresse Mekonnen	Ethiopia	3:48.95
2008	Andrew Baddeley	Great Britain	3:49.38
2007	Adil Kaouch	Morocco	3:51.14
2006	Alex Kipchirchir	Kenya	3:50.32
2005	Daham Najim Bashir	Qatar	3:47.97
2004	Not Held		
2003	Not Held		
2002	Hicham El Guerrouj	Morocco	3:50.12
2001	Ali Saïdi-Sief	Algeria	3:48.23
2000	Hicham El Guerrouj	Morocco	3:46.24
1999	Not Held		
1998	Not Held (Meet Had 1500m)		
1997	Hicham El Guerrouj	Morocco	**3:44.90 MR**
1996	Noureddine Morceli	Algeria	3:48.15
1995	Not Held (Meet Had 1500m)		
1994	Vénuste Niyongabo	Burundi	3:48.94
1993	Noureddine Morceli	Algeria	3:47.78
1992	David Kibet	Kenya	3:52.32
1991	Peter Elliott	Great Britain	3:49.46
1990	Joe Falcon	United States	3:49.31
1989	Abdi Bile	Somalia	3:49.90
1988	Steve Cram	Great Britain	3:48.85
1987	Steve Cram	Great Britain	3:50.08
1986	Steve Cram	Great Britain	3:48.31
1985	Steve Cram	Great Britain	3:46.32 (WR*, MR*)
1984	Not Held (Meet Had 1500m)		
1983	Steve Scott	United States	3:49.49
1982	Steve Scott	United States	3:47.69 (MR*)
1981 (Note: The 1981 Dream Mile was held at the Oslo Games on 11 July, separate from the Bislett Games on 26 June (which had a 1500 m won by Tom Byers). The Oslo Games was sometimes also incorrectly referred to as the Bislett Games.)	Steve Ovett	Great Britain	3:49.25
1980	Steve Ovett	Great Britain	3:48.8 (WR*, MR*)
1979	Sebastian Coe	Great Britain	3:49.0 (WR*, MR*)
1978	Wilson Waigwa	Kenya	3:53.2
1977	???		
1976	John Walker	New Zealand	3:55.5+
1975	???		
1974	Knut Kvalheim	Norway	3:56.2

*World Records (WRs) and Meet Records (MRs) denoted by an asterisk were significant performances that were former world and/or meet records in the mile at the time of their clocking. The current meet record (3:44.90, 1997), by Hicham El Guerrouj, is bolded.

== Other "Dream Miles" ==
The term "Dream Mile" is also used to describe several other major athletics events, notably the 1974 Commonwealth Games 1500 metres race ("metric mile") fought out between Filbert Bayi and John Walker in Christchurch, New Zealand. This was described by Duncan Mackay in The Observer as "...a race to rival the 'Miracle Mile' [taking] middle-distance running into a new era. To many it still remains the greatest 1,500m race ever." In this race, both of the first two runners broke the previous world record.

The current world record in the mile run was also set in a race where two athletes surpassed the previously standing world record—one might suggest it was a new record because the two had challenged each other to the finish. In Rome, 1999, Hicham El Guerrouj ran a time of 3:43.13 and Noah Ngeny finished at 3:43.40. This was the first time in over 40 years that two men had bettered the world record in the mile in the same race although this race was not called the "Dream Mile."

The first event called a "Dream Mile" was a match race between Jim Ryun and Marty Liquori on May 16, 1971. The event took place at the Martin Luther King International Freedom Games at Franklin Field in Philadelphia, Pennsylvania. Bob Hersh of Track & Field News wrote, "The build-up was probably the greatest for any single footrace since the historic 'Miracle Mile' at Vancouver, British Columbia in 1954."

Ryun, who was known for his kick, was the favorite. He had also run much faster than Villanova University's Liquori (3:51.1 to 3:57.2). The race went out slow, with both going 440 yards in the middle of the pack - slower than 61-seconds. Ryun took over at halfway (2:03.3). After the next turn, Liquori moved decisively. He passed the world record holder and led him through a lap in 56.7. In the last lap, Liquori would not surrender the lead. At the finish, Liquori prevailed as both clocked 3:54.6.

== See also ==
- Mile run world record progression
- Four-minute mile
- Dicksonpokalen
- Bowerman Mile
- Emsley Carr Mile
- Wanamaker Mile
