= Siah Albison =

British runner (1840–1891)

Siah Albison (1840–1891) was a professional British runner who set a world record in the mile in the 1860s.

A weaver from Bowlee near Manchester, Albison earned the mile championship belt of England in 1859. The belt was a creation of Copenhagen Grounds proprietor Tommy Hayes who had earlier declared Thomas Horspool "English champion" in the era before athletics organizations standardised events and championships. When Horspool retired from running shortly after setting a world record in the mile in 1858, Hayes sought out new talent to fill the stands.

On 27 October 1860, he arranged a race between Albison and William Lang. Held at the Copenhagen Grounds in Manchester, Albison prevailed by a little more than a yard in 4:22 1/4, a new world record.

From 1860 to about 1865, Albison raced at the Copenhagen Grounds and at other Manchester race venues, such as the City Grounds and the Royal Oak Grounds, drawing thousands. He was regularly challenged by Lang, their first rematch coming in March 1861, a race won by Albison. He won four more challenge races in 1861 and 1862, and over-all won seven of eight championship races.

His mile record was surpassed by Lang in 1863, and he finished in sixth place when Lang and William Richards set a joint world record of 4:17 1/4 on 19 August 1865, a record which would stand for nearly 16 years.

Albison became an inn proprietor when his running career ended.
