= Albert Johnson (race walker) =

British racewalker

Personal information
- Nationality: British (English)
- Born: 1 May 1931 Sheffield, England
- Died: 20 May 2011 (aged 80) Hobart, Tasmania, Australia
- Height: 178 cm (5 ft 10 in)
- Weight: 68 kg (150 lb)

Sport
- Sport: Athletics
- Event: Racewalking
- Club: Sheffield United Harriers

Albert H. Johnson (1 May 1931 – 20 May 2011) was a British racewalker. He competed in the men's 50 kilometres walk at the 1956 Summer Olympics and the 1960 Summer Olympics.
