= James Nuttall (runner) =

James Nuttall (29 December 1840 – February 1907) was a professional British runner, who broke several records, and is regarded as "one of the best sprinters and quarter milers in England in the 1860s". During his thirteen-year career, Nuttall ran 440 yards in 51.5 seconds, and ran the half-mile in a world's best time of 1:55.5.

Born in Reddish, Lancashire, Nuttall was the maternal grandson of mill-owner Issachar Thorp, who was heir to the Thorp dynasty of apothecaries and calico printing factories in Manchester.

Described as "compact, agile and powerful of limb", Nuttall easily won races ranging from 600 yards to half a mile. In 1859, Nuttall became the first Briton to run a quarter mile in fifty-one seconds. In Manchester in 1864, he ran 600 yards in 1:13, setting a world record, and defeating the favourite Siah Albison.

On 19 August 1865, Nuttall was among 'the great milers of the 1860s' who were gathered at Manchester's Royal Oak Grounds to compete for the title of Champion Miler of the World, as well as the Mile Championship Cup. Nuttall led the first two laps in sixty seconds, then hit the half-mile mark in an unprecedented 2:05.5. The crowd cheered him on, but Nuttall's pace was unsustainable. The race was eventually won by William Lang. Nuttall failed to finish the race, which suggests that he was only ever supposed to act as a pacemaker.

In 1867, at Manchester's Copenhagen Grounds, Nuttall beat Scottish runner Robert McInstray's existing half-mile world record, beating John Fleet with 1:55.5. This record stood for four years, until Irishman Frank Hewitt beat it by less than a second.

Nuttall and his first wife, Elizabeth Brookfield, were married at Manchester Cathedral on 11 August 1866. When his running career ended, Nuttall and his second wife moved to Ainsworth Street in Gorton (next door to Belle Vue Zoological Gardens), where he became a clogger. Nuttall's son Stephen later became a prominent trade union leader in North West England.
