= City of Sheffield and Dearne Athletic Club =

Athletics club in Sheffield, England

- Founded: 1894
- Ground: Sheffield Hallam University City Athletics Stadium
- Location: Stadium Way, Sheffield S9 3HL, England
- Coordinates: 53°23′22″N 1°25′58″W
- Website: official website

City of Sheffield & Dearne Athletic Club is an athletics club based in Sheffield, England. It is based at the Sheffield Hallam University City Athletics Stadium. The club competes in the British Athletics League Premiership and Northern Athletics League Division 1. The Young Athletes compete in the National Youth Development League. The Upper and Lower Age Group teams compete in the Northern East Premier Division.

== History ==
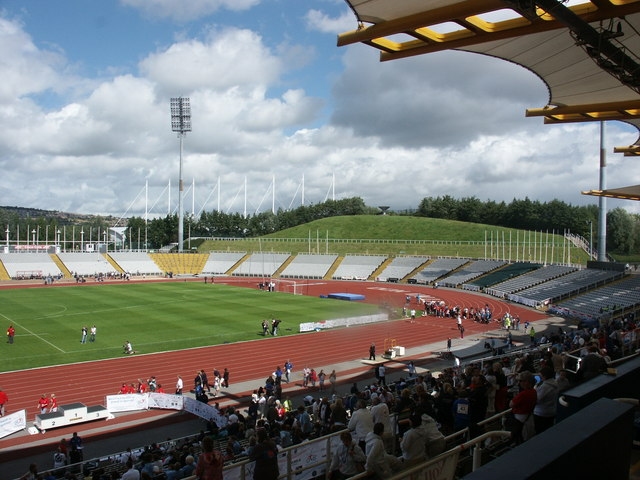
The club were based at the Don Valley Stadium from 1990 until 2013

The origins of the club derived from the Sheffield United Harriers who were formed in 1894. The first meeting of the club was reported in the Sporting Chronicle 22 May 1894. "The first evening meeting of this newly formed club took place yesterday evening at Bramall Lane in fine weather before 1,000 spectators." There were only 3 events on the timetable; the 100 yards, the 2 mile running race and the 1 mile bicycle race.

In 1975, Sheffield United Harriers amalgamated with Sheffield City Athletic Club to form Sheffield Athletic Club.

At the turn of the century the club assumed the name City of Sheffield Athletic Club. The club competed at the Don Valley Stadium until it closed in September 2013, moving to Sheffield Hallam University City Athletics Stadium after refurbishments.

In 2015 the club completed the merger with Dearne Athletic Club, founded by Trevor Fox and competes under the name of City of Sheffield & Dearne Athletic Club.

From 2017 the club have joined the UK Women's League.

== Honours ==
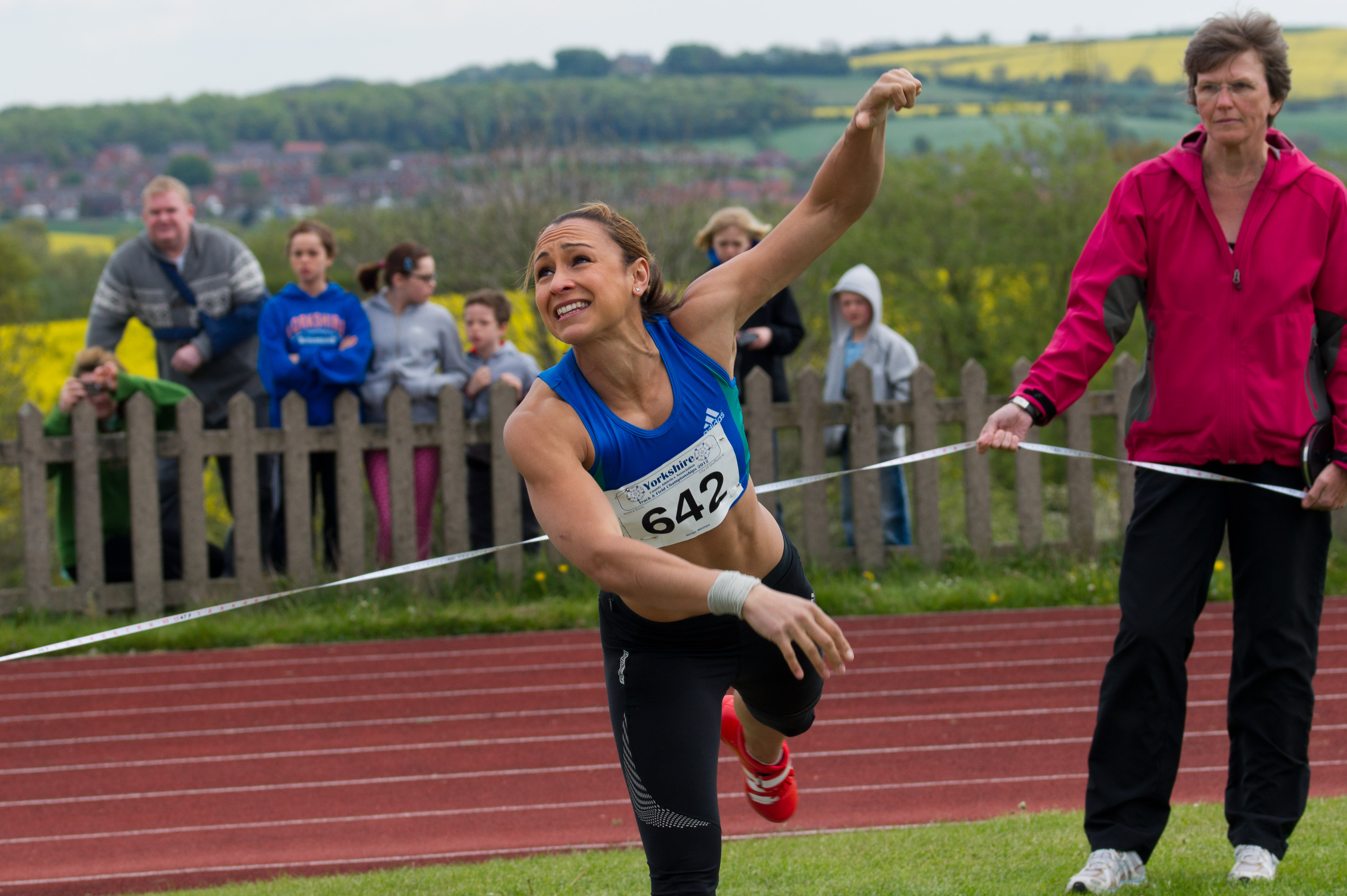
Jess Ennis in 2012

Senior Men:

- British Athletics League
  - Second Place: 2015
  - Third Place: 2013, 2014

Young Athletes:

- Youth Development League
  - Fifth Place: 2015

== Notable athletes ==
=== Olympians ===
| Athlete | Events | Olympics | Medals | notes/ref |
|---|---|---|---|---|
| Alan Patterson | 400 metres, 800 metres | 1908, 1912 | | Sheffield United Harriers |
| Lawrence Allen | 10km walk | 1952 | | Sheffield United Harriers |
| Roland Hardy | 10km walk, 20km walk | 1952, 1956 | | Sheffield United Harriers |
| Ken Wood | 1500 metres | 1956 | | Sheffield United Harriers |
| Albert Johnson | 50km walk | 1956, 1960 | | Sheffield United Harriers |
| Sheila Sherwood | long jump | 1964, 1968, 1972 | Silver medal | Sheffield City AC |
| John Sherwood | 400m hurdles, 4x400 relay | 1968, 1972 | Bronze medal | Sheffield City AC |
| Keith Angus | marathon | 1976 | | Sheffield AC |
| Brad McStravick | Decathlon | 1980, 1984 | | Sheffield AC |
| Jane Furniss-Shields | 3,000m, 10,000m | 1984, 1988 | | Sheffield AC |
| Jonathan Brown | 10000 metres, marathon | 1996, 2000, 2004 | | City of Sheffield AC |
| Jessica Ennis-Hill | heptathlon | 2012, 2016 | Gold medal Silver medal | City of Sheffield AC |

=== Other ===
- Luke Cutts, Commonwealth Games medallist
- David Johnson, 1978 Commonwealth Games
- Gerald Phiri, Olympian who trained with the club

== Kit ==
The club's vest consists of a thick blue stripe on the front and back in the centre, with dark green sides.
