= Thomas Horspool =

British athlete

Thomas Horspool (born 22 May 1830) was a British runner who set several world records in the mile soon after relatively precise running tracks and accurate timing devices came into use in the mid-19th century.

Born in Liverpool, but living in Basford, Horspool was a glove-knitter by trade. He won the 1853 mile championship in Sheffield, won it again in 1854 with a time of 4:29, and defeated main rival John Saville twice in 1856.

Their most famous race took place on 28 September 1857 at the Copenhagen Grounds in Manchester. There, Horspool defeated Saville by four yards and equaled the mile world record of 4:28 set by Charles Westhall in 1852.

Tommy Hayes, himself once a champion runner and now proprietor of the Copenhagen Grounds, declared Horspool "English champion," at a time when no governing body existed to establish titles or championships. Horspool returned to the track in 1858 where, on 12 July, he lived up to his title by defeating Manchester professional Job Smith by 10 yards in a new world record of 4:23. His time was called "an unsurpassed display of celerity."

Horspool retired as undefeated champion soon afterwards and became a publican.
