= Tom Byers (runner) =

American distance runner (born 1955)

Thomas Joseph Byers, Jr. (born May 12, 1955) is a former professional distance runner and current businessman. In 1981, when running as a designated pacemaker or 'rabbit' in the high-profile 1500 meters race at the Bislett Games in Oslo, he won against a field including Olympic champion and world record holder Steve Ovett, after the rest of the field refused to follow his early pacesetting.

== Career ==
Byers was a runner at Ohio State University in the 1970s and still holds the outdoor OSU distance record in the 1500m (3.37.5). He held the mile record (4:00.10.) until Jeff See broke it on June 2, 2007. During his time at OSU, he also won the U.S. Junior 1500m title, finished second at the AAU outdoor championships, and participated in the '76 Olympic Trials. Byers temporarily retired from competitive running for several years to join the corporate world, but returned to professional running in the 1980s. One thing for which Byers was noteworthy was his hair. Unlike most middle and long distance runners, who wore their hair short, Byers chose to wear his long.

His 3:50.84 mile ranks 11th fastest by a United States runner, while his 2:16.1 in the 1000 meters is the third fastest by a US runner.

=== Oslo, 1981 ===
On 26 June 1981, Byers took a victory in the 1500m race of the Bislett Games in Oslo, Norway. The world record holder Steve Ovett was a favourite to win the race, and Byers had only been called in at the last minute to act as a pacemaker. But Ovett and the pack did not follow his pace, and Byers did not step off the track. He was leading by almost ten seconds going into the final lap. Ovett ran the last lap almost nine seconds quicker than Byers but finished second by 0.53s.

Two weeks later at the 1981 Dream Mile (that year held at the separate "Oslo Games"), Byers finished 10th in 4:07.72 as Ovett won the race.

=== Pacemaker for world record miles ===
That same year, 1981, Byers went on to pace Sebastian Coe to two world records in the mile, on 19 August at the Weltklasse Zürich in Switzerland, and on 28 August at the Memorial Van Damme meeting in Brussels, Belgium.

== Personal life ==
He had two sons. One of his sons, Thomas Joseph Byers III (1985–2005), was a distance runner for Coffman High School in Dublin, Ohio (where he graduated in the same class as fellow student-athlete Brady Quinn), and went on to run at the University of Kentucky and the University of Mississippi. He died when he was struck by a train before his junior year at Kentucky.
