= William Cummings (athlete) =

Scottish runner

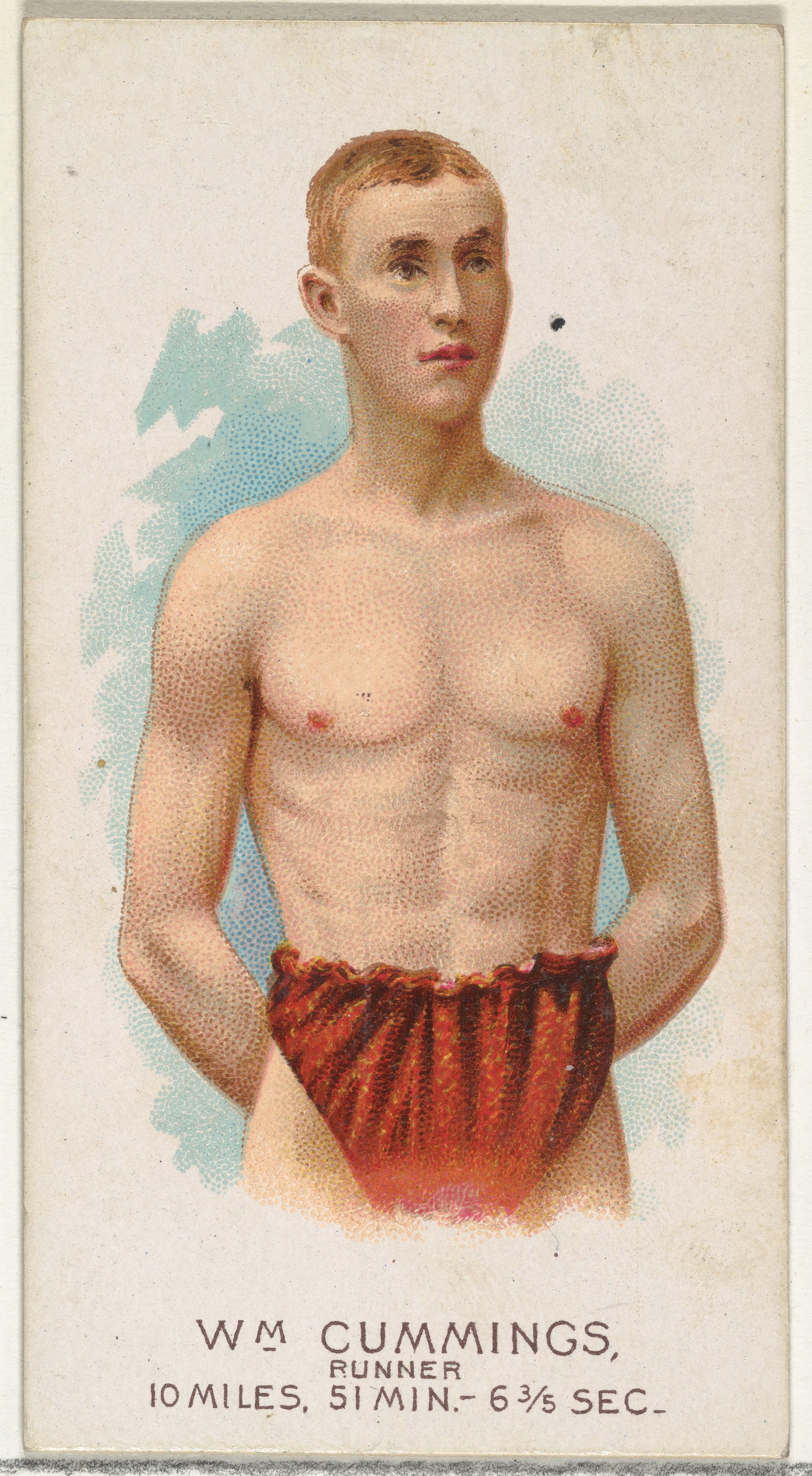
- Allen & Ginter cigarette card for Cummings, with his 10 miles personal best

Personal information
- Born: 10 June 1858
- Died: 13 July 1919 (aged 61)

William J. Cummings (10 June 1858 – 13 July 1919) was a Scottish professional runner who held the record for the mile in the 19th century and is perhaps best remembered for a series of races against Walter George, a top amateur runner who turned professional in part to challenge Cummings.

== Early professional career ==
Cummings, by the time he turned 18 in 1876, took up the life of a professional "bagtagger", as runners were known at the time. His first professional race came soon afterwards.

He ran the mile in 4:28 1/2 on 9 June 1877 and ran 4:25 the next year, as well as a two-mile race in 9:20 1/2. His times were enough to race for the Champion's Belt at Lillie Bridge on 1 July 1878. He won the race in 4:28 to become that year's Champion of England.

He won a mile race in 4:18 1/4 later that year in Glasgow and again in 4:19 1/2 two weeks later, and was considered to be at the top of pedestrianism.

The next few years were ones of mixed fortunes as he raced often and did not always win. He ran four miles in 19:57 1/4 in 1879, but lost his mile title to E. Dickenson who ran 4:20 4/5. He regained the Champion's Belt in 1880 with a 4:22 2/5 and won the 10 mile Belt with a 51:47 2/5 performance. Then he set a world record for 1 1/2 miles with 6:43 1/2, but lost late that year in the mile to William Duddle who ran 4:19 1/2.

Chastened by his defeats, Cummings was determined to regain his dominance in 1881. He beat Duddle over 1,000 yards on 30 April with a world record 2:17, then he regained the Championship Belt on 14 May, setting a mile record of 4:16 1/5 in the process. The previous record had stood for 16 years. He beat Duddle two more times over the mile that year, and dipped under 4:20 twice in December. As a result of his dominance, professional running started to die.

That soon changed with the emergence of Walter George, an amateur runner who set records in distances from 3/4 mile to 10 miles in 1882. After George had run 4:19 2/5 on 3 June of that year, thus setting a new amateur record for the mile with only three professionals faster at the distance - including, of course, Cummings - he challenged him to race, but was denied permission by the amateur authorities.

But by 1885, George had conquered all comers as an amateur and sought new challenges as a professional. Being badly in debt was also a factor in this decision to shed his amateur status.

== The 1885 challenge mile ==
The mile challenge race was held on 31 August 1885 at Lillie Bridge, witnessed by some 30,000 spectators. Crowds of people angry they had been denied entry broke through the closed entry gates and ended up completely encircling the running track both inside and out.

Cummings arrived at 5:30 pm and walked two laps of the track. George, caught in traffic, arrived shortly before 6:00 pm and climbed over the crowd with a ladder as the risk of injury pushing through the crowd was too great. Nevertheless, both runners had to force their way through the crowds with their handlers.

Betting was heavy, with Cummings favoured over George. At the gun, George dashed ahead, with Cummings close behind, in a steady rain. Cummings, who had won the coin toss, had chosen the third-of-a-mile rectangular cinder track at the site over the favoured quarter-mile cycling track. At the quarter mile point of the race, hindered by the slow track with sharp corners, George led with 58 3/5, a torrid pace which the crowd enthusiastically cheered.

But Cummings was close enough to be able to touch George's heels with his fingertips. At the half-mile point, they were at 2:01, and the crowd went delirious. At 1,000 yards, Cummings pulled even. At the three-quarter mark, George was at 3:07 1/2, only half a second slower than the world record pace.

Instead of slowing, George kept the pace, and Cummings struggled to keep up. Halfway through the final lap, Cummings gave up and started to walk, and since winning was the main concern today, George slowed to a walk when he was far enough ahead. Cummings, urged by his boosters, started to run again, which caused George to start to run again. He beat Cummings by some 65 yards in a time of 4:20 1/5, remarkably fast given his last lap.

Cummings got revenge later in 1885 by defeating George in a four-mile challenge race at Powderhall Grounds in Edinburgh, and in a 10-mile challenge soon after that back at Lillie Bridge.

== The 1886 challenge mile ==
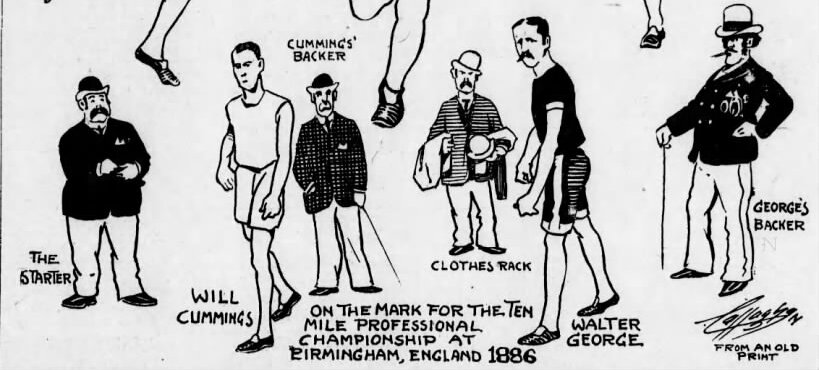
Brooklyn Eagle illustration of the George v. Cummings Ten Mile Professional Championship in 1886

Their most famous encounter occurred in 1886, in a rematch of their 1885-mile challenge. On 23 August, again at Lillie Bridge, the two runners raced each other in front of 20,000 spectators.

The starting gun was fired by former two-mile record-holder Jack White and George, as he did the year before, led off. The first lap was in 58 1/4. Cummings followed closely, looking relaxed. At the half, George was at 2:01 3/4. As they completed the third lap, neither runner looked weak. As they passed three-quarters in 3:07 3/4, Cummings pulled up alongside George and the crowd went wild.

Cummings launched a kick with 350 yards to go and opened an eight-yard lead. George held back, sure that Cummings could not hold the pace. Sure enough, George closed the gap, came even and then pulled ahead by two yards. Then, Cummings collapsed and George coasted to the finish.

The spectators, in contrast to the congratulatory mob which surrounded George the previous year upon his victory, waited silently for the time to be written on the blackboard. When the time was written down—4:12 3/4—pandemonium broke out. Cummings' record was gone. And George's mark would not be surpassed for almost 30 years.

Cummings got some revenge on George by defeating him in a four-mile challenge race, but George lapped him in a 10-mile challenge and was forced to drop out. In 1888, Cummings defeated George in a 3/4 mile race and two one-mile races, though neither time was faster than 4:30.
