= Noah Ngeny =

Kenyan middle-distance runner

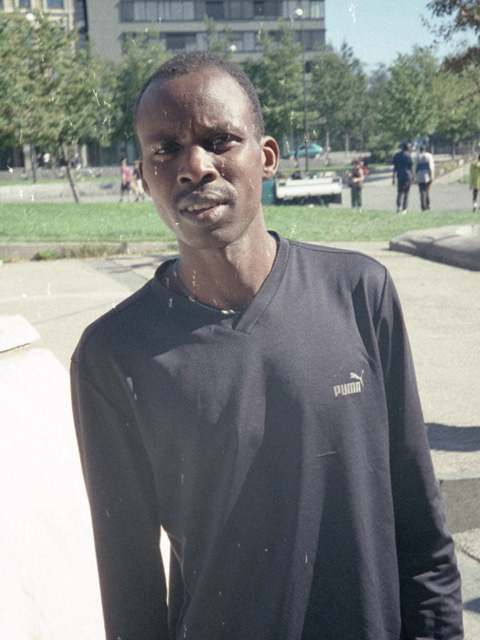

Personal information
- Born: 2 November 1978 (age 48) Uasin Gishu District, Kenya
- Years active: 1996—2005
- Height: 182 cm (6 ft 0 in)
- Weight: 68 kg (150 lb)

Sport
- Country: Kenya
- Sport: Athletics
- Event: 800m—3000m
- Coached by: Kim McDonald
- Retired: 2005

Achievements and titles
- Olympic finals: 2000 Sydney; 1500 m, Gold
- World finals: 1999 Sevilla; 1500 m, Silver; 2001 Lisbon; 1500 m, Bronze
- Personal bests: 800 m: 1:44.49 (Oslo, 2000); 1000 m: 2:11.96 (Rieti, 1999); 1500 m: 3:28.12 (Zürich, 2000); Mile: 3:43.40 NR (Rome, 1999); 3000 m: 7:35.46 (Sevilla, 2000); Indoors; 1500 m: 3:36.17i (Birmingham, 2001); 3000 m: 7:46.21i (Boston, 2003)
Medal record
Men's athletics
Representing Kenya
Olympic Games
Gold medal – first place	2000 Sydney	1500 m
World Championships
Silver medal – second place	1999 Sevilla	1500 m
World Indoor Championships
Bronze medal – third place	2001 Lisbon	1500 m
- Updated on 10 July 2026

Noah Kiprono Ngeny (pronounced /kɪˈproʊnoʊ ˈŋɛni/; born 2 November 1978) is a retired Kenyan middle-distance runner who won an Olympic gold medal over the 1500 metres at the 2000 Summer Olympics. With a time of 2:11.96, Ngeny held the world record over the 1000 metres from 1999 until it was broken by Emmanuel Wanyonyi in 2026. His national record of 3:43.40 in the mile stands as the third fastest in history.

Ngeny, who mainly specialized in the 1500 metres, has also won two national championships in the event, and multiple Golden League competitions.

== Career ==
Ngeny was born in the Uasin Gishu District in Kenya. Ngeny played volleyball during his school years and did not start running until 1996.

Ngeny first came to international prominence by setting two world junior records in 1997—3:32.91 for 1500 m in Monaco and 3:50.41 for the Mile in Nice, and under the guidance of renowned manager and coach, the late Kim McDonald, his progression continued in 1998, improving his 1500 m time to 3:30.34 in Monaco.

On 7 July 1999, in Roma, Ngeny was second to Hicham El Guerrouj when the latter set the world record (3:43.13) for the mile run. Ngeny stayed close to El Guerrouj down the stretch to finish at 3:43.40, still the third-fastest mile ever run as of 2026, and almost a full second inside the old world record (3:44.39) of Noureddine Morceli.

On 24 August 1999, Ngeny took the 1500 m silver medal (3:28.73) in the IAAF 1999 World Championships in Athletics in Sevilla, Spain, behind the reigning world champion El Guerrouj (3:27.65).

On 5 September 1999, Ngeny set the former world record 2:11.96 over 1000 metres in Rieti, Italy, breaking the 18-years-standing record 2:12.18 set by Sebastian Coe in 1981. Ngeny's time of 2:11.96 now stands as the second best time ever ran, as Emmanuel Wanyonyi beat his time by over a tenth of a second at the 2026 Herculis in 2:11.83. The previous record had been the oldest standing record within athletics at the time.

In 1999 Ngeny recorded six sub 3:30 clockings for 1500 m and established himself as the closest rival to world champion and world record holder El Guerrouj.

On 11 August 2000, Ngeny finished second to El Guerrouj (3:27.21) in the 1500 m at the Weltklasse Zürich meet in a time of 3:28.12, making him the Kenyan record holder and third-fastest ever in the event. This record was surpassed by Bernard Lagat's 3:26.34 in Brussels on 24 August 2001. Lagat achieved this record when he finished 2nd behind Hicham El Guerrouj (3:26.12).

=== Sydney triumph ===
On 29 September 2000, at the 1500 m final of 2000 Sydney Olympics, El Guerrouj, world record holder and twice world champion, had only been defeated once since the previous Olympics, and was the overwhelming favourite. The two rivals led the race going into the last lap of the final, El Guerrouj leading Ngeny. With less than 100 m to go, Ngeny started moving next to the leader, grabbing the lead with just 15 m to go. He held on until the finish line, causing one of the greatest upsets at the Sydney Olympics.

In the process, Ngeny set an Olympic record of 3:32.07, surpassing Sebastian Coe's Olympic record of 3:32.53, set in 1984. El Guerrouj settled for silver in 3:32.32 and Ngeny's compatriot Bernard Lagat, another Kenyan runner at that time, later a US citizen, took bronze in 3:32.44.

Ngeny became the third Kenyan to win the 1500 m crown following Kip Keino (1968 Mexico City Olympics) and Peter Rono (1988 Seoul Olympics).

The year 2000 was the highlight of Ngeny's running career. He posted career bests of 1:44.49 for 800 m (28 July 2000 in Oslo) and 3:28.12 for 1500 m (at the Weltklasse Zürich on 11 August 2000), en route to his Olympic triumph (29 September 2000).

As of October 2019, his career best time of 3:28.12 at Zürich makes him the seventh-fastest 1500m runner of all time, behind El Guerrouj, Lagat, Noureddine Morceli, Jakob Ingebrigtsen, Silas Kiplagat and Asbel Kiprop.

=== After Sydney ===
Ngeny was dropped from the Kenyan team for the 2001 World Championships in Edmonton after defying instructions from the national federation to return home from Britain where he trained.

Ngeny returned to Australia in 2001 to win the Goodwill Games Mile in Brisbane. A car crash in Kenya in November of that year put him out of action for much of the winter. The injury sustained in the car accident (injury to the back and pelvis) dogged Ngeny ever since. He competed sparsely in 2003 and 2004 recording a best time of 3:33.38 but failing in his attempt to qualify for the Kenyan Olympic team, and was not able to defend his title in Athens. Ngeny did not run at the Kenyan trials for the 2003 World Championships because of the injuries.

Ngeny announced his official retirement from international athletics on 22 November 2006.

After retirement, he has been an athletics coach for Kenya Defence Forces.

Ngeny would eventually become an athletes' representative for Kenya. In 2016, he quit his post in protest of the poor response of Kenyan representatives to a doping crisis.
