= Derek Ibbotson =

English runner (1932–2017)

Derek Ibbotson MBE
Personal information
- Nationality: British (English)
- Born: June 17, 1932 Huddersfield, England
- Died: 23 February 2017 (aged 84) Wakefield, England
- Height: 175 cm (5 ft 9 in)
- Weight: 68 kg (150 lb)

Sport
- Sport: Athletics
- Event: long distance
- Club: Longwood Harriers
Medal record
Men's Athletics
Representing Great Britain
Olympic Games
Bronze medal – third place	1956 Melbourne	5,000 metres

George Derek Ibbotson MBE (17 June 1932 – 23 February 2017) was an English runner who excelled in athletics in the 1950s. His most famous achievement was setting a new world record in the mile in 1957.

== Biography ==
Ibbotson was born on 17 June 1932 in Huddersfield in the West Riding of Yorkshire, and studied at King James's Grammar School, Almondbury. He was of the generation that included other great British 'milers' (1 mile running specialists) such as Roger Bannister, Chris Brasher and Christopher Chataway. He was the junior champion in Britain in 1951 and after service in the Royal Air Force, Ibbotson returned to competition.

Ibbotson finished second behind Chris Chataway in the 3 miles event at the 1955 AAA Championships before becoming the British 3 miles champion after winning the British AAA Championships title at the 1956 AAA Championships.

Later that year he represented Great Britain at the 1956 Olympic Games in Melbourne, winning a bronze medal in the 5,000 metres. After the games, Ibbotson focused primarily on the mile and began the 1957 season running in mile races, as a 5,000m or 3 mile runner would often do in the early part of the racing season - to race at a faster pace than he would need in those longer distances. After he had run a particularly fast mile at a Glasgow meeting, an experienced athletics official told the BBC that while it was a very good time, he and many others felt that Ibbotson's greater potential was over 5,000m or 3 miles. In a race dubbed "the mile of the century", Ibbotson won with a new world record time, taking 0.8 of a second off John Landy's time of 3.58 min set in 1954. He retained his 3 miles AAA title at the 1957 AAA Championships.

Ibbotson never found the same form again. He represented England in the Empire Games at Cardiff in 1958, finishing tenth in the 3 miles. Ibbotson soldiered on and in 1960, in a bid to enter the Rome Olympics, he copied Gordon Pirie who, when he was struggling for form, increased his racing and took part in shorter races than usual, because it was good speed training. Ibbotson was not so successful and was not selected. After a poor 1961 season, he found success on the indoor circuit, becoming the 1962 European Indoor champion for 2 miles (8:47.8).

He was one of many signatories in a letter to The Times on 17 July 1958 opposing the policy of apartheid in international sport and defending 'the principle of racial equality which is embodied in the Declaration of the Olympic Games'.

In 2004, he received an honorary degree of Doctor of Civil Laws from the University of Huddersfield. He was appointed Member of the Order of the British Empire (MBE) in the 2008 New Year Honours for services to athletics. In 2011, he was inducted into the England Athletics Hall of Fame.

A qualified electrical engineer, he worked initially for the Coal Board but later was employed in sales, latterly as an executive and agent for Puma, the sportswear company. Turning later to squash, he represented Yorkshire, twice winning the Yorkshire veterans championship. He also played golf until he was in his 70s.

Ibbotson was married twice. His first wife, Madeline Wooller, was an English cross country international runner. They had three daughters together, Christine, Nicola and Georgina. Madeline and Ibbotson divorced and later Ibbotson married Ann Parmenter. They had a daughter together, Joanna. Ann died in 1997.

Ibbotson died in Wakefield on 23 February 2017, aged 84. A large crowd attended his funeral service led by The Vicar of Huddersfield, the Rev Canon Simon Moor, at St Peter's Church in Huddersfield, who said Derek Ibbotson epitomised all that was life-enhancing about sport and noted that "two of Derek’s proudest achievements were being awarded his MBE in 2008 and receiving an honorary degree from Huddersfield University."

Records
Preceded by John Landy	Men's mile world record holder 19 July 1957–6 August 1958	Succeeded by Herb Elliott
