= Mile run world record progression =

List of world records for the mile run

The world record in the mile run is currently held by runners Josh Kerr, the current men's world record holder, with a time of 3:42.66 set on July 18, 2026, and Faith Kipyegon, the current women's record holder, with a time of 4:07.64 set on June 26, 2025. Since 1976, the mile has been the only non-metric distance recognized by World Athletics (formerly the International Association of Athletics Federations (IAAF)) for record purposes. In international competitions such as the Olympics the term "metric mile" is sometimes used to refer to a distance of 1,500 meters, which is 109.344 meters shorter than an Imperial mile, even though four "full" laps of a 400 meter track is equal to 1,600 meters.

Accurate times for the mile run (1.609344 km) have been recorded since 1850, when the first precisely measured running tracks were built. Progression of the mile record accelerated in the 1930s as newsreel coverage greatly popularized the sport, making stars out of milers such as Jules Ladoumègue, Jack Lovelock, and Glenn Cunningham. In the 1940s, Swedes Arne Andersson and Gunder Hägg lowered the record to 4:01.4 while racing was curtailed during World War II in the combatant countries. After the war, Roger Bannister of the United Kingdom and John Landy of Australia vied to be the first to break the fabled four-minute mile barrier. Roger Bannister did it first on May 6, 1954, and John Landy followed 46 days later.

On the women's side, the first sub-5:00 mile was achieved by the UK's Diane Leather 23 days after Bannister's first sub-4:00 mile. However, the International Association of Athletics Federations (IAAF) did not recognize women's records for the distance until 1967, when Anne Smith of the UK ran 4:37.0.

== Men ==
=== Professionals ===
Time	Athlete	Nationality	Date	Venue
4:28	Charles Westhall	United Kingdom	26 July 1855	London
4:28	Thomas Horspool	United Kingdom	28 September 1857	Manchester
4:23	Thomas Horspool	United Kingdom	12 July 1858	Manchester
4:22 1/4	Siah Albison	United Kingdom	27 October 1860	Manchester
4:21 3/4	William Lang	United Kingdom	11 July 1863	Manchester
4:20 1/2	Edward Mills	United Kingdom	23 April 1864	Manchester
4:20	Edward Mills	United Kingdom	25 June 1864	Manchester
4:17 1/4	William Lang	United Kingdom	19 August 1865	Manchester
4:17 1/4	William Richards	United Kingdom	19 August 1865	Manchester
4:16 1/5	William Cummings	United Kingdom	14 May 1881	Preston
4:12 3/4	Walter George	United Kingdom	23 August 1886	London

=== Amateurs ===
Time	Athlete	Nationality	Date	Venue
4:55	J. Heaviside	United Kingdom	1 April 1861	Dublin
4:49	J. Heaviside	United Kingdom	27 May 1861	Dublin
4:46	Matthew Greene	United Kingdom	27 May 1861	Dublin
4:33	George Farran	United Kingdom	23 May 1862	Dublin
4:29 3/5	Walter Chinnery	United Kingdom	10 March 1868	London
4:28 4/5	Walter Gibbs	United Kingdom	3 April 1868	London
4:28 3/5	Charles Gunton	United Kingdom	31 March 1873	London
4:26 0/5	Walter Slade	United Kingdom	30 May 1874	London
4:24 1/2	Walter Slade	United Kingdom	1 June 1875	London
4:23 1/5	Walter George	United Kingdom	16 August 1880	London
4:19 2/5	Walter George	United Kingdom	3 June 1882	London
4:18 2/5	Walter George	United Kingdom	21 June 1884	Birmingham
4:17 4/5	Thomas Conneff	United Kingdom	26 August 1893	Cambridge
4:17 0/5	Fred Bacon	United Kingdom	6 July 1895	London
4:15 3/5	Thomas Conneff	United Kingdom	28 August 1895	New York City
4:15 2/5	John Paul Jones	United States	27 May 1911	Cambridge

As there was no recognized official sanctioning body until 1912, there are several versions of the mile progression before that year. One version starts with Richard Webster (GBR) who ran 4:36.5 in 1865, surpassed by Chinnery in 1868.

Another variation of the amateur record progression pre-1862 is as follows:

Time	Athlete	Nationality	Date	Venue
4:52	Cadet Marshall	United Kingdom	2 September 1852	Addiscombe
4:45	Thomas Finch	United Kingdom	3 November 1858	Oxford
4:45	St. Vincent Hammick	United Kingdom	15 November 1858	Oxford
4:40	Gerald Surman	United Kingdom	24 November 1859	Oxford
4:33	George Farran	United Kingdom	23 May 1862	Dublin

=== IAAF / World Athletics era ===
The first world record in the mile for men (athletics) was recognized by the International Amateur Athletics Federation (later known as the International Association of Athletics Federations and currently known as World Athletics) in 1913.

To June 21, 2009, the IAAF has ratified 32 world records in the event.

Ratified
Not ratified
Ratified but later rescinded
Pending ratification

Time	Auto	Athlete	Nationality	Date	Venue
4:14.4		John Paul Jones	United States	31 May 1913	Allston, Mass.
4:12.6		Norman Taber	United States	16 July 1915	Allston, Mass.
4:10.4		Paavo Nurmi	Finland	23 August 1923	Stockholm
4:09.2		Jules Ladoumègue	France	4 October 1931	Paris
4:07.6		Jack Lovelock	New Zealand	15 July 1933	Princeton, N.J.
4:06.8		Glenn Cunningham	United States	16 June 1934	Princeton, N.J.
4:06.4		Sydney Wooderson	Great Britain	28 August 1937	Motspur Park
4:06.2		Gunder Hägg	Sweden	1 July 1942	Gothenburg
4:06.2		Arne Andersson	Sweden	10 July 1942	Stockholm
4:04.6		Gunder Hägg (2)	Sweden	4 September 1942	Stockholm
4:02.6		Arne Andersson (2)	Sweden	1 July 1943	Gothenburg
4:01.6		Arne Andersson (3)	Sweden	18 July 1944	Malmö
4:01.4		Gunder Hägg (3)	Sweden	17 July 1945	Malmö
3:59.4		Roger Bannister	Great Britain	6 May 1954	Oxford
3:58.0		John Landy	Australia	21 June 1954	Turku
3:57.2		Derek Ibbotson	Great Britain	19 July 1957	London
3:54.5		Herb Elliott	Australia	6 August 1958	Dublin
3:54.4		Peter Snell	New Zealand	27 January 1962	Wanganui
3:54.1	3:54.04	Peter Snell (2)	New Zealand	17 November 1964	Auckland
3:53.6		Michel Jazy	France	9 June 1965	Rennes
3:51.3		Jim Ryun	United States	17 July 1966	Berkeley, Cal.
3:51.1		Jim Ryun (2)	United States	23 June 1967	Bakersfield, Cal.
3:51.0		Filbert Bayi	Tanzania	17 May 1975	Kingston
3:49.4		John Walker	New Zealand	12 August 1975	Gothenburg
3:49.0	3:48.95	Sebastian Coe	Great Britain	17 July 1979	Oslo
3:48.8		Steve Ovett	Great Britain	1 July 1980	Oslo
3:48.53		Sebastian Coe (2)	Great Britain	19 August 1981	Zürich
3:48.40		Steve Ovett (2)	Great Britain	26 August 1981	Koblenz
3:47.33		Sebastian Coe (3)	Great Britain	28 August 1981	Brussels
3:46.32		Steve Cram	Great Britain	27 July 1985	Oslo
3:44.39		Noureddine Morceli	Algeria	5 September 1993	Rieti
3:43.13		Hicham El Guerrouj	Morocco	7 July 1999	Rome
3:42.66		Josh Kerr	Great Britain	18 July 2026	London

The "Time" column indicates the ratified mark; the "Auto" column indicates a fully automatic time that was also recorded in the event when hand-timed marks were used for official records, or which was the basis for the official mark, rounded to the 10th of a second, depending on the rules then in place.

Records for the mile were rounded up to the nearest tenth of a second commencing January 1, 1957. Previously, records were rounded up to the nearest fifth of a second. Those rounded-up marks were: Cunningham's 4:06.8 (timed at 4:06.7); Hägg's 4:06.2 (4:06.1); Hägg's 4:01.4 (4:01.3); Landy's 3:58.0 (3:57.9). Landy's mark was not retroactively adjusted when the new rule came into effect. Auto times to the hundredth of a second were accepted by the IAAF for events up to and including 10,000 m beginning in 1981.

During the world record-setting race in 1999, Noah Ngeny came in second place to Hicham El Guerrouj with a time of 3:43.40, which stood as the second fastest mile in history until the new record was set by Josh Kerr in July 2026.

== Men's indoor ==
=== Men indoor pre-IAAF ===
Time	Auto	Athlete	Nationality	Date	Venue
4:39.2		Lawrence Myers	United States	April 25, 1885	New York, N.Y.
4:39.2		Ernest Hjertberg	United States	May 10, 1889	New York, N.Y.
4:31.4		William Day	United States	February 5, 1890	Brooklyn, N.Y.
4:28.4		Ernest Hjertberg	United States	February 13, 1892	Boston, Mass.
4:26.0		Andrew Walsh	United States	November 30, 1895	Brooklyn, N.Y.
4:25.2		Melvin Sheppard	United States	January 26, 1906	New York, N.Y.
4:23.8		Melvin Sheppard	United States	March 30, 1906	New York, N.Y.
4:19.8		Herbert Trube	United States	February 13, 1909	New York, N.Y.
4:19.8		Oscar Hedlund	United States	February 22, 1912	Troy, N.Y.
4:18.8		Oscar Hedlund	United States	February 12, 1913	New York, N.Y.
4:18.2		Abel Kiviat	United States	February 15, 1913	New York, N.Y.
4:16.0		John Overton	United States	March 10, 1917	Philadelphia, Pa.
4:14.6		Joseph Ray	United States	April 12, 1919	Chicago, Ill.
4:13.6		Paavo Nurmi	Finland	January 6, 1925	New York, N.Y.
4:13.4		Lloyd Hahn	United States	February 14, 1925	New York, N.Y.
4:12.0		Paavo Nurmi	Finland	March 7, 1925	Buffalo, N.Y.
4:12.0		Joseph Ray	United States	March 17, 1925	New York, N.Y.
4:11.2		Gene Venzke	United States	February 6, 1932	New York, N.Y.
4:10.0		Gene Venzke	United States	February 17, 1932	New York, N.Y.
4:09.8		Glenn Cunningham	United States	March 25, 1933	Chicago, Ill.
4:08.4		Glenn Cunningham	United States	March 17, 1934	New York, N.Y.
4:04.4 OT		Glenn Cunningham	United States	March 3, 1938	Hanover, N.H.
4:07.4		Glenn Cunningham	United States	March 12, 1938	New York, N.Y.
4:07.4		Charles Fenske	United States	February 3, 1940	New York, N.Y.
4:07.4		Charles Fenske	United States	February 17, 1940	New York, N.Y.
4:07.4		Leslie MacMitchell	United States	February 15, 1941	New York, N.Y.
4:07.4		Walter Mehl	United States	February 15, 1941	New York, N.Y.
4:07.3		Gilbert Dodds	United States	March 11, 1944	New York, N.Y.
4:06.4		Gilbert Dodds	United States	March 18, 1944	Chicago, Ill.
4:05.3		Gilbert Dodds	United States	January 31, 1948	New York, N.Y.
4:04.9		Wes Santee	United States	February 15, 1954	East Lansing, Mich.
4:03.8		Wes Santee	United States	January 29, 1955	Boston, Mass.
4:03.6		Gunnar Nielsen	Denmark	February 5, 1955	New York, N.Y.
4:03.4		Ron Delany	Ireland	March 14, 1958	Chicago, Ill.
4:02.5		Ron Delany	Ireland	February 21, 1959	New York, N.Y.
4:01.4		Ron Delany	Ireland	March 7, 1959	New York, N.Y.
3:58.9		Jim Beatty	United States	February 10, 1962	Los Angeles, Cal.
3:58.6		Jim Beatty	United States	February 15, 1963	New York, N.Y.
3:56.6		Tom O'Hara	United States	February 13, 1964	New York, N.Y.
3:56.4		Tom O'Hara	United States	March 6, 1964	Chicago, Ill.
3:56.4		Jim Ryun	United States	February 19, 1971	San Diego, Cal.
3:55.0		Tony Waldrop	United States	February 17, 1974	San Diego, Cal.
3:55.0	3:54.93	Dick Buerkle	United States	January 13, 1978	College Park, Md.
3:52.6		Eamonn Coghlan	Ireland	February 16, 1979	San Diego, Cal.
3:50.6		Eamonn Coghlan	Ireland	February 20, 1981	San Diego, Cal.

=== Men indoor IAAF era ===
The IAAF started to recognize indoor world records in 1987, with the then world's best time, Coghlan's 3:49.78, ratified as the inaugural record for the mile.

Time	Athlete	Nationality	Date	Venue
3:49.78	Eamonn Coghlan	Ireland	February 27, 1983	East Rutherford
3:48.45	Hicham El Guerrouj	Morocco	February 12, 1997	Ghent
3:47.01	Yomif Kejelcha	Ethiopia	March 3, 2019	Boston
3:46.63	Yared Nuguse	United States	February 8, 2025	New York
3:45.14	Jakob Ingebrigtsen	Norway	February 13, 2025	Liévin

== Road men ==
=== IAAF era ===
The Road Mile became an official world record event after September 1, 2023, on World Athletics Certified Courses only (i.e: elevation gradient must not exceed one meter per kilometer, start and finish line must not be more than half a mile apart). Faster times have been recorded in non-compliant events such as the Fifth Avenue Mile. The winning times from the 2023 U.S. Road Mile Championships, on 25 April, were ratified by World Athletics as the inaugural road mile world records.

Key:

Awaiting ratification

h = hand-timed

Time	Athlete	Nationality	Date	Venue	Ref.
4:01.21	Samuel Prakel	United States	April 25, 2023	Des Moines	
3:56.13	Hobbs Kessler	United States	October 1, 2023	Riga	
3:54.6h	Emmanuel Wanyonyi	Kenya	April 27, 2024	Herzogenaurach	
3:51.3h	Elliot Giles	United Kingdom	September 1, 2024	Düsseldorf	

== Women ==
=== Pre-IAAF ===
Time	Athlete	Nationality	Date	Venue
6:13.2	Elizabeth Atkinson	United Kingdom	24 June 1921	Manchester
5:27.5	Ruth Christmas	United Kingdom	20 August 1932	London
5:24.0	Gladys Lunn	United Kingdom	1 June 1936	Brentwood
5:23.0	Gladys Lunn	United Kingdom	18 July 1936	London
5:20.8	Gladys Lunn	United Kingdom	8 May 1937	Dudley
5:17.0	Gladys Lunn	United Kingdom	7 August 1937	London
5:15.3	Evelyn Forster	United Kingdom	22 July 1939	London
5:11.0	Anne Oliver	United Kingdom	14 June 1952	London
5:09.8	Enid Harding	United Kingdom	4 June 1953	London
5:08.0	Anne Oliver	United Kingdom	12 September 1953	Consett
5:02.6	Diane Leather	United Kingdom	30 September 1953	London
5:00.3	Edith Treybal	Romania	1 November 1953	Timișoara
5:00.2	Diane Leather	United Kingdom	26 May 1954	Birmingham
4:59.6	Diane Leather	United Kingdom	29 May 1954	Birmingham
4:50.8	Diane Leather	United Kingdom	24 May 1955	London
4:45.0	Diane Leather	United Kingdom	21 September 1955	London
4:41.4	Marise Chamberlain	New Zealand	8 December 1962	Perth
4:39.2	Anne Smith	United Kingdom	13 May 1967	London

=== Women's IAAF era ===
The first world record in the mile for women (athletics) was recognized by the International Amateur Athletics Federation (later known as the International Association of Athletics Federations and currently known as World Athletics), in 1967. To June 21, 2009, the IAAF has ratified 13 world records in the event.

Time	Auto	Athlete	Nationality	Date	Venue
4:37.0		Anne Smith	United Kingdom	3 June 1967	London
4:36.8		Maria Gommers	Netherlands	14 June 1969	Leicester
4:35.3		Ellen Tittel	West Germany	20 August 1971	Sittard
4:29.5		Paola Pigni	Italy	8 August 1973	Viareggio
4:23.8		Natalia Mărășescu	Romania	21 May 1977	Bucharest
4:22.1	4:22.09	Natalia Mărășescu	Romania	27 January 1979	Auckland
4:21.7	4:21.68	Mary Decker	United States	26 January 1980	Auckland
4:20.89		Lyudmila Veselkova	Soviet Union	12 September 1981	Bologna
4:18.08		Mary Decker-Tabb	United States	9 July 1982	Paris
4:17.44		Maricica Puică	Romania	9 September 1982	Rieti
4:16.71		Mary Decker-Slaney	United States	21 August 1985	Zürich
4:15.61		Paula Ivan	Romania	10 July 1989	Nice
4:12.56		Svetlana Masterkova	Russia	14 August 1996	Zürich
4:12.33		Sifan Hassan	Netherlands	12 July 2019	Monaco
4:07.64		Faith Kipyegon	Kenya	21 July 2023	Monaco

The "Time" column indicates the ratified mark; the "Auto" column indicates a fully automatic time that was also recorded in the event when hand-timed marks were used for official records, or which was the basis for the official mark, rounded to the 10th of a second, depending on the rules then in place.

The IAAF recognized times to the hundredth of a second starting in 1981.

Note:

- Decker ran 4:17.55 indoors in Houston on 16 February 1980, but this time was rejected as a record due to an oversized track.
- Natalya Artyomova (Soviet Union) ran 4:15.8 in Leningrad on 6 August 1984, but this time was rejected as a record due to there being no international judges.

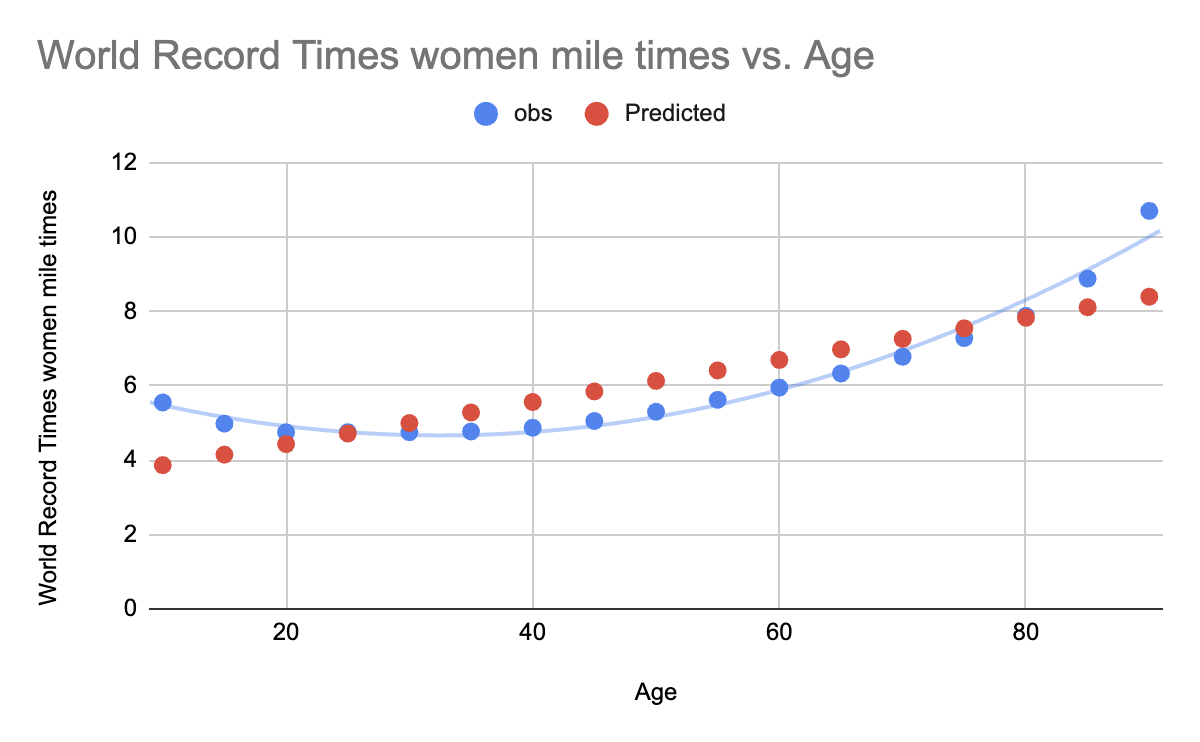
This chart showcases women's world record times and their progression by age.

== Women's indoor ==
=== Women indoor pre-IAAF ===
Time	Athlete	Nationality	Date	Venue
5:17.2	Brenda Cook	United Kingdom	February 5, 1966	Cosford United Kingdom
5:03.6	Joyce Smith	United Kingdom	February 12, 1966	Cosford United Kingdom
4:52.0	Doris Brown	United States	February 19, 1966	Vancouver Canada
4:40.4	Doris Brown	United States	February 18, 1967	Vancouver Canada
4:38.5	Debbie Heald	United States	March 17, 1972	Richmond United States
4:35.6	Francie Larrieu	United States	February 17, 1973	San Diego United States
4:34.6	Francie Larrieu	United States	February 2, 1974	Seattle United States
4:29.0	Francie Larrieu	United States	February 15, 1975	San Diego United States
4:28.5	Francie Larrieu	United States	March 3, 1975	Richmond United States
4:24.6	Mary Decker	United States	January 22, 1982	Los Angeles United States
4:21.47	Mary Decker	United States	February 12, 1982	New York United States

=== Women indoor IAAF era ===
Time	Athlete	Nationality	Date	Venue
4:20.5	Mary Decker	United States	February 19, 1982	San Diego United States
4:18.86	Doina Melinte	Romania	February 13, 1988	East Rutherford United States
4:17.14	Doina Melinte	Romania	February 9, 1990	East Rutherford United States
4:13.31	Genzebe Dibaba	Ethiopia	February 17, 2016	Stockholm Sweden

== Road women ==
=== IAAF era ===
Note: The Road Mile became an official world record event after September 1, 2023, on World Athletics Certified Courses only (i.e: elevation gradient must not exceed one meter per kilometer, start and finish line must not be more than half a mile apart). The winning times from the 2023 U.S. Road Mile Championships, on 25 April, were ratified by World Athletics as the inaugural road mile world records.

Key:

Awaiting ratification

Wo = Women Only Race

Time	Athlete	Nationality	Date	Venue
4:27.97 Wo	Nikki Hiltz	United States	April 25, 2023	Des Moines
4:20.98 Wo	Deribe Welteji	Ethiopia	October 1, 2023	Riga

== See also ==
- 1500 metres world record progression
