= List of American high school students who have run a four-minute mile =

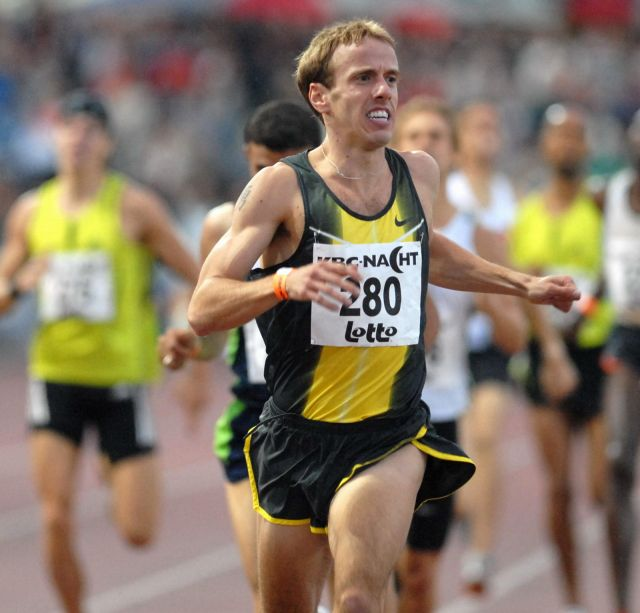
Alan Webb, the high school record holder

This is a list of American high school students who have run a four-minute mile since the feat was first accomplished in 1964.

The first person to run the mile (1,760 yards, or 1,609.344 metres) in under four minutes was Roger Bannister in 1954, in a time of 3:59.4. This barrier would not be broken by a high school student until 1964, when Jim Ryun ran the distance in a time of 3:59.0 at the Compton Relays. Ryun went on to set a national high school record of 3:55.3, which stood until 2001 when it was broken by Alan Webb. Thirty-five U.S. high school students have run the mile in less than four minutes since 1964. From 1964 to 2017, only ten boys ran a mile in under four minutes; between 2020 and 2025, twenty boys have broken the four-minute mark.

== U.S. high school mile record holders ==
=== Jim Ryun ===
After setting the national high school record in the mile, Jim Ryun set the world record in 1966 and then again in 1967, when he ran 3:51.1. Ryun was 19 at the time, making him the youngest world record holder in the mile to date. His record stood for nine years. Ryun competed in the 1964, 1968 and 1972 Olympic games. He took silver in the men's 1500m at the 1968 Summer Olympics.

=== Alan Webb ===
Alan Webb broke Ryun's 36-year old high school mile record (3:55.3), running 3:53.43 at the Prefontaine Classic in 2001. Webb also ran what was then an American record in the mile, in 2007, at 3:46.91. Despite finding success in high school and on the track, Webb had an inconsistent career that was riddled with injuries, such as achilles tendonitis and a stress fracture in his foot and tibia.

Name	Time	Date	Venue	Location
Jim Ryun	3:59.0	June 5, 1964	Compton Invitational	Los Angeles, California
Jim Ryun	3:58.3	May 15, 1965	KSHSAA Track and Field Championships	Wichita, Kansas
Jim Ryun	3:58.1	May 29, 1965	California Relays	Modesto, California
Jim Ryun	3:56.8	June 4, 1965	Compton Invitational	Los Angeles, California
Jim Ryun	3:55.3	June 27, 1965	AAU Track and Field Championships	San Diego, California
Tim Danielson	3:59.4	June 11, 1966	San Diego Invitational	San Diego, California
Marty Liquori	3:59.8	June 23, 1967	AAU Track and Field Championships	Bakersfield, California
Alan Webb	3:59.86 (indoors)	January 20, 2001	New Balance Games	New York City, New York
Alan Webb	3:53.43	May 27, 2001	Prefontaine Classic	Eugene, Oregon
Lukas Verzbicas	3:59.71	June 11, 2011	Adidas Grand Prix	New York City, New York
Matthew Maton	3:59.38	May 8, 2015	Oregon Twilight Meet	Eugene, Oregon
Grant Fisher	3:59.38	June 4, 2015	Festival of Miles	St. Louis, Missouri
Drew Hunter	3:58.25 (indoors)	February 6, 2016	Armory Track Invitational	New York City, New York
Drew Hunter	3:57.81 (indoors)	February 20, 2016	NYRR Millrose Games	New York City, New York
Michael Slagowski	3:59.53	April 29, 2016	Jesuit Twilight Invitational	Portland, Oregon
Reed Brown	3:59.30	June 1, 2017	Festival of Miles	St. Louis, Missouri
Leo Daschbach	3:59.54	May 23, 2020	The Quarantine Clasico	El Dorado Hills, California
Hobbs Kessler	3:57.66 (indoors)	February 7, 2021	American Track League Invitational	Fayetteville, Arkansas
Colin Sahlman	3:58.81 (indoors)	February 5, 2022	Dr. Sander Invitational/Columbia Challenge	New York City, New York
Gary Martin	3:57.98	May 14, 2022	Philadelphia Catholic League Championships	Springfield, Pennsylvania
Colin Sahlman	3:56.24	May 28, 2022	Prefontaine Classic	Eugene, Oregon
Gary Martin	3:57.89	June 2, 2022	Festival of Miles	St. Louis, Missouri
Connor Burns	3:58.83	June 2, 2022	Festival of Miles	St. Louis, Missouri
Rheinhardt Harrison	3:59.33	June 3, 2022	Golden South Series #2	Tarpon Springs, Florida
Simeon Birnbaum	3:59.51	June 15, 2022	Brooks PR Invitational	Seattle, Washington
Connor Burns	3:59.51 (indoors)	February 26, 2023	Last Chance Indoor National Qualifier at BU	Boston, Massachusetts
Rocky Hansen	3:59.56	April 30, 2023	Virginia High Performance Meet	Charlottesville, Virginia
Simeon Birnbaum	3:57.53	June 1, 2023	Festival of Miles	St. Louis, Missouri
Rocky Hansen	3:58.24	June 1, 2023	Festival of Miles	St. Louis, Missouri
Tinoda Matsatsa	3:58.7	June 1, 2023	Festival of Miles	St. Louis, Missouri
Jackson Heidesch	3:59.08	June 1, 2023	Festival of Miles	St. Louis, Missouri
JoJo Jourdon	3:59.87 (indoors)	February 3, 2024	New Balance Indoor Grand Prix	Boston, Massachusetts
Drew Griffith	3:57.72	May 30, 2024	Festival of Miles	St. Louis, Missouri
Drew Griffith	3:59.00	June 16, 2024	New Balance Nationals Outdoor	Philadelphia, Pennsylvania
Zachary Hillhouse	3:59.62	June 16, 2024	New Balance Nationals Outdoor	Philadelphia, Pennsylvania
Owen Powell	3:57.74 (indoors)	February 15, 2025	UW Husky Classic	Seattle, Washington
Owen Powell	3:56.66 (indoors)	February 22, 2025	Terrier DMR Challenge	Boston, Massachusetts
Josiah Tostenson	3:57.47 (indoors)	February 22, 2025	Terrier DMR Challenge	Boston, Massachusetts
Tayvon Kitchen	3:59.61 (indoors)	February 22, 2025	Terrier DMR Challenge	Boston, Massachusetts
Tommy Latham	3:59.79	March 28, 2025	Marist Mile	Brookhaven, Georgia
TJ Hansen	3:59.02	May 24, 2025	RunningLane Track Championships	Huntsville, Alabama
Corbin Coombs	3:59.23	May 24, 2025	RunningLane Track Championships	Huntsville, Alabama
Quentin Nauman	3:58.65	June 5, 2025	HOKA Festival of Miles	St. Louis, MO
Josiah Tostenson	3:59.00	June 5, 2025	HOKA Festival of Miles	St. Louis, MO
Noah Bontrager	3:59.48 (indoors)	March 15, 2026	New Balance Nationals Indoor	Boston, Massachusetts
Jackson Spencer	3:58.17	April 24, 2026	Jesuit Twilight Relays	Portland, Oregon
Jackson Spencer	3:57.24	June 4, 2026	HOKA Festival of Miles	St. Louis, MO
Carter Smith	3:59.00	June 4, 2026	HOKA Festival of Miles	St. Louis, MO
Brian Burns	3:59.70	June 4, 2026	HOKA Festival of Miles	St. Louis, MO
Dylan Rowell	3:59.93	June 7, 2026	Brooks PR Invitational	Seattle, Washington

Note: all of the above runners were high school seniors when they ran under four minutes for the mile except for Ryun in 1964, Burns and Birnbaum in 2022, and Nauman in 2025 who were juniors at the time.
