= 2024 New Balance Indoor Grand Prix =

Athletics meeting in Boston, Massachusetts

- Dates: 4 February 2024 (men's U20 mile held on 3 February)
- Host city: Boston, Massachusetts, United States
- Venue: The TRACK at New Balance
- Level: 2024 World Athletics Indoor Tour

The 2024 New Balance Indoor Grand Prix was the 29th edition of the annual indoor track and field meeting in Boston, Massachusetts. Held on 4 February, it was the third leg of the 2024 World Athletics Indoor Tour Gold series – the highest-level international indoor track and field circuit.

The men's under-20 mile was held the day before the rest of the program, on 3 February. In the race, Jojo Jourdon became the 21st American high school student to have run a four-minute mile by running 3:59.87.

In the main program, Gabby Thomas, who attended high school and college in Boston, won the 300 metres event. In the 1000 metres, Canadian Marco Arop bested the American field and ran a time of 2:14.74, a Canadian record and the second-fastest indoor performance of all time. Defending 100 metres world champion Noah Lyles set a personal best and meeting record to win the 60 metres in 6.44 seconds – defeating 2022 world 100 m champion Fred Kerley in the process.

== Results ==
=== World Athletics Indoor Tour ===
Men's 60m
Place	Athlete	Country	Time	Points
1st place, gold medalist(s)	Noah Lyles	United States	6.44	10
2nd place, silver medalist(s)	Ackeem Blake	Jamaica	6.45	7
3rd place, bronze medalist(s)	Ronnie Baker	United States	6.54	5
4	Fred Kerley	United States	6.55	3
5	Kendal Williams	United States	6.58	
6	Abdul Hakim Sani Brown	Japan	6.60	
7	Brandon Carnes	United States	6.64	
8	Josephus Lyles	United States	6.69	

Men's 60m Round 1
Place	Athlete	Country	Time	Heat
1	Noah Lyles	United States	6.54	1
2	Fred Kerley	United States	6.57	2
3	Ackeem Blake	Jamaica	6.58	2
4	Ronnie Baker	United States	6.59	1
5	Abdul Hakim Sani Brown	Japan	6.60	1
6	Kendal Williams	United States	6.63	2
7	Brandon Carnes	United States	6.65	1
8	Josephus Lyles	United States	6.67	2
9	Miles Lewis	Puerto Rico	6.71	1
10	J.T. Smith	United States	6.72	2

Men's 1000m
Place	Athlete	Country	Time	Points
1st place, gold medalist(s)	Marco Arop	Canada	2:14.74	10
2nd place, silver medalist(s)	Bryce Hoppel	United States	2:16.91	7
3rd place, bronze medalist(s)	Sam Ellis	United States	2:17.10	5
4	Josh Hoey	United States	2:17.23	3
5	Mariano García	Spain	2:17.97	
6	Ryan Clarke	Netherlands	2:18.35	
7	Nathan Green	United States	2:18.56	

Men's 3000m
Place	Athlete	Country	Time	Points
1st place, gold medalist(s)	Lamecha Girma	Ethiopia	7:29.09	10
2nd place, silver medalist(s)	Edwin Kurgat	Kenya	7:39.38	7
3rd place, bronze medalist(s)	Brian Fay	Ireland	7:40.09	5
4	Ben Flanagan	Canada	7:40.19	3
5	Andrew Coscoran	Ireland	7:40.36	
6	Charles Philibert-Thiboutot	Canada	7:41.12	
7	Maximilian Thorwirth	Germany	7:43.15	
8	Mahadi Abdi Ali	Netherlands	7:44.21	
9	James West	Great Britain	7:50.44	
10	Christian Noble	United States	8:04.56	
	Derek Johnson	United States	DNF	
	Jack Anstey	Australia	DNF	

Women's 400m
Place	Athlete	Country	Time	Points
1st place, gold medalist(s)	Kendall Ellis	United States	52.77	10
2nd place, silver medalist(s)	Raevyn Rogers	United States	53.00	7
3rd place, bronze medalist(s)	Helena Ponette	Belgium	53.43	5
4	Lisanne de Witte	Netherlands	53.58	3
5	Junelle Bromfield	Jamaica	53.60	
6	Nicole Yeargin	Great Britain	54.29	

Women's 1500m
Place	Athlete	Country	Time	Points
1st place, gold medalist(s)	Gudaf Tsegay	Ethiopia	3:58.11	10
2nd place, silver medalist(s)	Birke Haylom	Ethiopia	3:58.43	7
3rd place, bronze medalist(s)	Emily Mackay	United States	4:05.04	5
4	Addison Wiley	United States	4:07.32	3
5	Esther Guerrero	Spain	4:07.67	
6	Dani Jones	United States	4:07.83	
7	Lucia Stafford	Canada	4:08.36	
8	Marta Pérez	Spain	4:08.40	
9	Nozomi Tanaka	Japan	4:08.46	
10	Ayal Dagnachew	Ethiopia	4:13.15	
11	Kaela Edwards	United States	4:13.37	
	Kate Mitchell	United States	DNF	
	Aurora Rynda	Canada	DNF	

Women's 60mH
Place	Athlete	Country	Time	Points
1st place, gold medalist(s)	Tia Jones	United States	7.72	10
2nd place, silver medalist(s)	Tobi Amusan	Nigeria	7.75	7
3rd place, bronze medalist(s)	Devynne Charlton	Bahamas	7.76	5
4	Masai Russell	United States	7.84	3
5	Christina Clemons	United States	7.94	
6	Cindy Sember	Great Britain	8.00	
7	Megan Tapper	Jamaica	8.02	
8	Mariam Abdul-Rashid	Canada	8.06	

Women's Long Jump
Place	Athlete	Country	Mark	Points
1st place, gold medalist(s)	Tara Davis-Woodhall	United States	6.86 m	10
2nd place, silver medalist(s)	Quanesha Burks	United States	6.64 m	7
3rd place, bronze medalist(s)	Ese Brume	Nigeria	6.58 m	5
4	Ruth Usoro	Nigeria	6.47 m	3

=== Indoor Meeting ===
Men's 400m
Place	Athlete	Country	Time
1st place, gold medalist(s)	Vernon Norwood	United States	45.76
2nd place, silver medalist(s)	Zakithi Nene	South Africa	46.15
3rd place, bronze medalist(s)	Champion Allison	United States	46.23
4	Trevor Stewart	United States	46.33

Men's 600m
Place	Athlete	Country	Time
1st place, gold medalist(s)	Mark English	Ireland	1:16.64
2nd place, silver medalist(s)	John Rivera	Puerto Rico	1:16.67
3rd place, bronze medalist(s)	Olivier Desmeules	Canada	1:16.68
4	Hazem Miawad	Egypt	1:17.03
5	Jake Ulrich	United States	1:17.22
6	Dubem Nwachukwu	Nigeria	1:18.25

Men's 1500m
Place	Athlete	Country	Time
1st place, gold medalist(s)	Hobbs Kessler	United States	3:33.66
2nd place, silver medalist(s)	Jake Wightman	Great Britain	3:34.06
3rd place, bronze medalist(s)	Craig Engels	United States	3:37.04
4	Sam Prakel	United States	3:37.24
5	Vincent Ciattei	United States	3:37.33
6	Ignacio Fontes	Spain	3:37.59
7	Kieran Lumb	Canada	3:37.75
8	Yohanes Asmare	Ethiopia	3:38.35
9	Thomas Keen	Great Britain	3:38.40
10	Samuel Abate	Ethiopia	3:39.32
11	Benoît Campion	France	3:40.01
	Mohad Abdikadar	Italy	DNF
	Abraham Alvarado	United States	DNF
	Charles Grethen	Luxembourg	DNF
	Saúl Ordóñez	Spain	DNF

Men's 60mH
Place	Athlete	Country	Time
1st place, gold medalist(s)	Grant Holloway	United States	7.35
2nd place, silver medalist(s)	Trey Cunningham	United States	7.49
3rd place, bronze medalist(s)	Daniel Roberts	United States	7.49
4	Cordell Tinch	United States	7.55
5	Michael Dickson	United States	7.57
6	Lafranz Campbell	Jamaica	7.66
7	Andre Korbmacher	United States	7.67
8	Louis Rollins	United States	7.70

Men's 60mH Round 1
Place	Athlete	Country	Time	Heat
1	Grant Holloway	United States	7.37	2
2	Trey Cunningham	United States	7.44	1
3	Daniel Roberts	United States	7.51	1
4	Cordell Tinch	United States	7.60	2
5	Michael Dickson	United States	7.64	2
6	Louis Rollins	United States	7.65	1
7	Lafranz Campbell	Jamaica	7.66	1
8	Andre Korbmacher	United States	7.69	1
9	Giano Roberts	Jamaica	7.70	2
10	Joshua Zeller	Great Britain	7.81	2
11	Orlando Bennett	Jamaica	7.87	1

Men's Long Jump
Place	Athlete	Country	Mark
1st place, gold medalist(s)	Carey McLeod	Jamaica	8.20 m
2nd place, silver medalist(s)	Jacob Fincham-Dukes	Great Britain	8.02 m
3rd place, bronze medalist(s)	JuVaughn Harrison	United States	7.87 m
4	LaQuan Nairn	Bahamas	7.76 m
5	Will Williams	United States	7.73 m
6	Jarrion Lawson	United States	7.66 m
7	Rayvon Grey	United States	7.64 m

Women's 60m
Place	Athlete	Country	Time
1st place, gold medalist(s)	Mikiah Brisco	United States	7.10
2nd place, silver medalist(s)	Celera Barnes	United States	7.15
3rd place, bronze medalist(s)	Destiny Smith-Barnett	United States	7.16
4	Zoe Hobbs	New Zealand	7.16
5	Kiara Parker	United States	7.18
6	Brianna Selby	United States	7.30
7	Shannon Ray	United States	7.34
8	Kennedy Blackmon	United States	7.40

Women's 60m Round 1
Place	Athlete	Country	Time	Heat
1	Zoe Hobbs	New Zealand	7.16	1
2	Destiny Smith-Barnett	United States	7.17	2
3	Kiara Parker	United States	7.18	1
4	Mikiah Brisco	United States	7.18	2
5	Celera Barnes	United States	7.21	1
6	Brianna Selby	United States	7.35	2
7	Kennedy Blackmon	United States	7.35	2
8	Shannon Ray	United States	7.39	2
9	Briana Williams	Jamaica	9.09	1

Women's 300m
Place	Athlete	Country	Time
1st place, gold medalist(s)	Gabrielle Thomas	United States	35.75
2nd place, silver medalist(s)	Favour Ofili	Nigeria	35.99
3rd place, bronze medalist(s)	Lynna Irby	United States	36.05

Women's 800m
Place	Athlete	Country	Time
1st place, gold medalist(s)	Samantha Watson	United States	2:01.20
2nd place, silver medalist(s)	Isabelle Boffey	Great Britain	2:01.53
3rd place, bronze medalist(s)	Allie Wilson	United States	2:01.84
4	Carley Thomas	Australia	2:01.96
5	Lorena Martín	Spain	2:02.03
6	Olivia Baker	United States	2:02.71
7	Wilma Nielsen	Sweden	2:02.91
8	Ellie Baker	Great Britain	2:03.78
9	Camille Laus	Belgium	2:06.03
10	Kristie Schoffield	United States	2:06.78
	Aziza Ayoub	Puerto Rico	DNF

Women's 3000m
Place	Athlete	Country	Time
1st place, gold medalist(s)	Jessica Hull	Australia	8:24.93
2nd place, silver medalist(s)	Elle Purrier St. Pierre	United States	8:25.25
3rd place, bronze medalist(s)	Melknat Wudu	Ethiopia	8:32.34
4	Medina Eisa	Ethiopia	8:32.35
5	Senayet Getachew	Ethiopia	8:32.49
6	Aynadis Mebratu	Ethiopia	8:33.01
7	Melissa Courtney-Bryant	Great Britain	8:37.74
8	Marta García	Spain	8:38.34
9	Hannah Nuttall	Great Britain	8:45.61
10	Julie-Anne Staehli	Canada	8:51.19
11	Izzy Fry	Great Britain	8:52.15
12	Fantaye Belayneh	Ethiopia	8:58.34
13	Aimee Pratt	Great Britain	9:06.81
	Anna Camp Bennett	United States	DNF
	Isabella Thornton-Bott	Australia	DNF

=== Masters Events ===
Men's Mile
Place	Athlete	Country	Time
1st place, gold medalist(s)	Edward Baker	United States	4:26.79
2nd place, silver medalist(s)	Brian McNamara	United States	4:29.24
3rd place, bronze medalist(s)	T.J. Unger	United States	4:29.32

Women's Mile
Place	Athlete	Country	Time
1st place, gold medalist(s)	Jenn Lutz	United States	5:07.65
2nd place, silver medalist(s)	Sascha Scott	United States	5:10.87
3rd place, bronze medalist(s)	Caryn Gehrke	United States	5:15.92
4	Jennifer St. Jean	United States	5:17.83
5	Sonja Friend-Uhl	United States	5:20.44
6	Catherine O'Connor	United States	5:20.54
	Brett Ely	United States	DNF

=== U20 Events ===
Men's Mile
Place	Athlete	Country	Time
1st place, gold medalist(s)	Jojo Jourdon	United States	3:59.87
2nd place, silver medalist(s)	Drew Griffith	United States	4:02.71
3rd place, bronze medalist(s)	Corey Campbell	Great Britain	4:04.10
4	Clay Shively	United States	4:04.55
5	Adam Burlison	United States	4:05.07
6	Owen Powell	United States	4:06.46
7	Steven Hergenrother	United States	4:09.76
8	Patrick Hilby	United States	4:10.10
9	Jack Fenlon	Ireland	4:10.22
10	Miles Ramer	United States	4:15.34
11	Daniel Simmons	United States	4:18.29
12	Tendai Nyabadza	Great Britain	4:18.55
13	Caolan McFadden	Ireland	4:25.78
	Jaxson Hoey	United States	DNF

Women's Mile
Place	Athlete	Country	Time
1st place, gold medalist(s)	Sadie Engelhardt	United States	4:34.45
2nd place, silver medalist(s)	Allie Zealand	United States	4:37.76
3rd place, bronze medalist(s)	Samantha Humphries	United States	4:39.11
4	Ali Ince	United States	4:39.74
5	Lyla Belshaw	Great Britain	4:42.85
6	Charlotte Bell	United States	4:44.39
7	Hanne Thomsen	United States	4:45.24
8	Abby Cheeseman	United States	4:48.87
9	Isabel Conde Frankenberg	Argentina	4:54.08
10	Logan St. John	United States	4:55.20
11	Clodagh Gill	Ireland	5:08.37
	Annie Mann	Great Britain	DNF
