= 2025 New Balance Indoor Grand Prix =

Athletics meeting in Boston, Massachusetts

- Dates: 2 February 2025
- Host city: Boston, Massachusetts, United States
- Venue: The TRACK at New Balance
- Level: 2025 World Athletics Indoor Tour

The 2025 New Balance Indoor Grand Prix was the 30th edition of the annual indoor track and field meeting in Boston, Massachusetts. Held on 2 February, it was the third leg of the 2025 World Athletics Indoor Tour Gold series – the highest-level international indoor track and field circuit.

In the main program, Josh Hoey set a world lead and third fastest North American indoor performance in the men's 1500 metres, winning the event with a time of 3:33.66. Grant Fisher finished second in the race with a time of 3:33.99, the fourth fastest indoor time in North American history. In the women's 3000 metres, another world lead was set by Melissa Courtney-Bryant. That race also the professional debut for Parker Valby. The men's 3000 meter was won by Andrew Coscoran, who set both a world lead and an Irish national record. Two other national records were set by Azeddine Habz and Cameron Myers, for France and Australia respectively. While no world leads were set in the sprinting events, they did feature 17 year-old Quincy Wilson winning the men's 400 metres in a new U18 world best, Olympic champion Masai Russell winning the women's 60 metres hurdles, Grant Holloway continued his 11-year long 60 metres hurdles winning streak, and reigning Olympic and world 100 meter champion Noah Lyles cruising to a victory in the men's 60 metres.

== Results ==
=== World Athletics Indoor Tour ===
Men's 400m
Place	Athlete	Country	Time	Points
1st place, gold medalist(s)	Quincy Wilson	United States	45.66	10
2nd place, silver medalist(s)	Will Sumner	United States	46.27	7
3rd place, bronze medalist(s)	Jereem Richards	Trinidad and Tobago	46.49	5
4	Zakithi Nene	South Africa	46.56	3

Men's 1500m
Place	Athlete	Country	Time	Points
1st place, gold medalist(s)	Josh Hoey	United States	3:33.66	10
2nd place, silver medalist(s)	Grant Fisher	United States	3:33.99	7
3rd place, bronze medalist(s)	Olli Hoare	Australia	2:34.91	5
4	Thomas Keen	Great Britain	3:35.12	3
5	Graham Blanks	Great Britain	3:36.11	
6	Jochem Vermeulen	Belgium	3:36.17	
7	Joe Waskom	United States	3:36.23	
8	Kieran Lumb	Canada	3:38.57	
9	Stewart McSweyn	Australia	3:39.05	
10	Vincent Ciattei	United States	3:42.27	
	Christian Noble	United States	3:44.91	
	Jonah Hoey	United States	DNF	

Men's 60m Hurdles
Place	Athlete	Country	Time	Points
1st place, gold medalist(s)	Grant Holloway	United States	7.42	10
2nd place, silver medalist(s)	Freddie Crittenden	United States	7.54	7
3rd place, bronze medalist(s)	Cordell Tinch	United States	7.60	5
4	Jamal Britt	United States	7.64	3
	Trey Cunningham	United States	DNF	

Men's 60m Hurdles Round 1
Place	Athlete	Country	Time	Heat
1	Grant Holloway	United States	7.47	1
2	Freddie Crittenden	United States	7.60	2
3	Trey Cunningham	United States	7.60	2
4	Cordell Tinch	United States	7.61	2
5	Jamal Britt	United States	7.67	1
6	Eric Edwards	United States	7.67	1
7	Louis Rollins	United States	7.68	1
8	Robert Dunning	United States	7.71	2

Men's High Jump
Place	Athlete	Country	Time	Points
1st place, gold medalist(s)	Vernon Turner	United States	2.19	10
2nd place, silver medalist(s)	Romaine Beckford	Jamaica	2.19	7
3rd place, bronze medalist(s)	Luis Castro Rivera	Puerto Rico	2.19	5
4	Dontavious Hill	United States	2.14	3
5	Donald Thomas	Bahamas	NM	

Women's 60m
Place	Athlete	Country	Time	Points
1st place, gold medalist(s)	Jacious Sears	United States	7.11	10
2nd place, silver medalist(s)	Destiny Smith-Barnett	Liberia	7.14	7
3rd place, bronze medalist(s)	Celera Barnes	United States	7.14	5
4	Zoe Hobbs	New Zealand	7.15	3
5	Mikiah Brisco	United States	7.20	

Women's 60m Round 1
Place	Athlete	Country	Mark	Heat
1	Jacious Sears	United States	7.15	1
2	Destiny Smith-Barnett	Liberia	7.20	2
3	Celera Barnes	United States	7.23	2
4	Zoe Hobbs	New Zealand	7.25	2
5	Mikiah Brisco	United States	7.29	1
6	Audrey Leduc	Canada	7.35	2
7	Tamara Clark	United States	7.40	2
8	Cambrea Sturgis	United States	7.41	2

Women's 3000m
Place	Athlete	Country	Time	Points
1st place, gold medalist(s)	Melissa Courtney-Bryant	Great Britain	8:28.69	10
2nd place, silver medalist(s)	Elise Cranny	United States	8:29.87	7
3rd place, bronze medalist(s)	Parker Valby	United States	8:34.95	5
4	Sarah Healy	Ireland	8:35.19	3
5	Emily Mackay	United States	8:35.35	
6	Georgia Bell	Great Britain	8:36.96	
7	Hannah Nuttall	Great Britain	8:40.01	
8	Lea Meyer	Germany	8:40.96	
9	Melknat Wudu	Ethiopia	8:42.48	
10	Dani Jones	United States	8:42.83	
11	Sintayehu Vissa	Italy	8:54.94	
12	Emma Coburn	United States	8:56.55	
	Taryn Rawlings	United States	DNF	

Women's Triple Jump
Place	Athlete	Country	Time	Points
1st place, gold medalist(s)	Jasmine Moore	United States	13.89	10
2nd place, silver medalist(s)	Anne-Suzanna Fosther-Katta	Cameroon	13.84	7
3rd place, bronze medalist(s)	Jessie Maduka	Germany	13.67	5
4	Dovilė Kilty	Lithuania	13.45	3
5	Imani Oliver	Jamaica	13.22	

=== Indoor Meeting ===
Men's 60m
Place	Athlete	Country	Time
1st place, gold medalist(s)	Noah Lyles	United States	6.52
2nd place, silver medalist(s)	Terrence Jones	Bahamas	6.57
3rd place, bronze medalist(s)	PJ Austin	United States	6.60
4	Marcell Jacobs	Italy	6.63
5	Trayvon Bromell	United States	6.64

Men's 60m Round 1
Place	Athlete	Country	Time	Heat
1	Noah Lyles	United States	6.55	2
2	Terrence Jones	Bahamas	6.59	2
3	Trayvon Bromell	United States	6.63	1
4	PJ Austin	United States	6.63	1
5	Udodi Onwuzurike	Nigeria	6.66	2
6	Marcell Jacobs	Italy	6.69	1
7	Brandon Carnes	United States	6.70	2
8	Miles Lewis	Puerto Rico	6.72	2
9	JT Smith	United States	6.73	1
10	Josephus Lyles	United States	6.80	1

Men's 300m
Place	Athlete	Country	Time
1st place, gold medalist(s)	Rai Benjamin	United States	32.21
2nd place, silver medalist(s)	Vernon Norwood	United States	32.39
3rd place, bronze medalist(s)	Matthew Boling	United States	32.82
4	Jake Odey-Jordan	Great Britain	33.73

Men's 800m
Place	Athlete	Country	Time
1st place, gold medalist(s)	Bryce Hoppel	United States	1:46.04
2nd place, silver medalist(s)	Abraham Alvarado	United States	1:46.55
3rd place, bronze medalist(s)	Josué Canales	Spain	1:46.60
4	Ryan Clarke	Netherlands	1:46.68
5	Mark English	Ireland	1:46.82
6	Pieter Sisk	Belgium	1:46.88
	Grant Grosvenor	United States	DNF

Men's 3000m
Place	Athlete	Country	Time
1st place, gold medalist(s)	Andrew Coscoran	Ireland	7:30.75
2nd place, silver medalist(s)	Azeddine Habz	France	7:31.50
3rd place, bronze medalist(s)	Cameron Myers	Australia	7:33.12
4	Hobbs Kessler	United States	7:35.06
5	James West	Great Britain	7:37.13
6	Sam Gilman	United States	7:38.27
7	Neil Gourley	Great Britain	7:49.95
8	Sam Prakel	United States	7:50.40
9	Luke Houser	United States	8:03.44
	Sam Tanner	New Zealand	DNF
	Charles Philibert-Thiboutot	Canada	DNF

Women's 300m
Place	Athlete	Country	Mark
1st place, gold medalist(s)	Julien Alfred	Saint Lucia	36.16
2nd place, silver medalist(s)	Dina Asher-Smith	Great Britain	36.87
3rd place, bronze medalist(s)	Emma Montoya	France	38.37
4	Bianca Stubler	United States	39.33

Women's 500m
Place	Athlete	Country	Time
1st place, gold medalist(s)	Raevyn Rogers	United States	1:08.98
2nd place, silver medalist(s)	Helena Ponette	Belgium	1:09.69
3rd place, bronze medalist(s)	Samantha Watson	United States	1:10.55
4	Jasmine Jones	United States	1:10.65
5	Lisanne de Witte	Netherlands	1:10.81
6	Anastazja Kuś	Poland	1:11.01

Women's Mile
Place	Athlete	Country	Time
1st place, gold medalist(s)	Heather MacLean	United States	4:23.32
2nd place, silver medalist(s)	Susan Ejore	Kenya	4:23.55
3rd place, bronze medalist(s)	Sinclaire Johnson	United States	4:23.58
4	Dorcus Ewoi	Kenya	4:26.03
5	Gabija Galvydytė	Lithuania	4:28.42
6	Nozomi Tanaka	Japan	4:28.54
7	Sadie Engelhardt	United States	4:29.34
8	Maia Ramsden	New Zealand	4:31.16
9	Sage Hurta-Klecker	United States	4:32.68
	Hollie Parker	Great Britain	DNF

Women's 60m Hurdles
Place	Athlete	Country	Time
1st place, gold medalist(s)	Masai Russell	United States	7.80
2nd place, silver medalist(s)	Grace Stark	United States	7.81
3rd place, bronze medalist(s)	Devynne Charlton	Bahamas	7.85
4	Ackera Nugent	Jamaica	7.92
5	Christina Clemons	United States	8.02

=== U20 Events ===
Men's Mile
Place	Athlete	Country	Time
1st place, gold medalist(s)	Elliot Vermeulen	Belgium	4:00.48
2nd place, silver medalist(s)	Owen Powell	United States	4:01.14
3rd place, bronze medalist(s)	Josiah Tostenson	United States	4:03.85
4	TJ Hansen	United States	4:03.87
5	Soheib Dissa	United States	4:06.86
6	Corbin Coombs	United States	4:06.89
7	Cole Boone	United States	4:07.27
8	Tayvon Kitchen	United States	4:07.57
9	Frank Buchanan	Ireland	4:11.98
10	Tamrat Gavenas	United States	4:14.37
11	Keegan Smith	United States	4:19.50
	Grant Grosvenor	United States	DNF

Women's Mile
Place	Athlete	Country	Time
1st place, gold medalist(s)	Paige Sheppard	United States	4:44.49
2nd place, silver medalist(s)	Hanne Thomsen	United States	4:44.54
3rd place, bronze medalist(s)	Sophia Bendet	United States	4:46.34
4	Elin Latta	United States	4:46.39
5	Pia Langton	Ireland	4:52.54
6	Chiara Dailey	United States	4:55.56
7	Elyse Wilmes	United States	5:04.11
8	Olivia Cieslak	United States	5:05.60
	Elise Thorner	Great Britain	DNF
