= Lukas Verzbicas =

Lithuanian–American triathlete (b. 1993)

Personal information
- Nationality: Lithuanian; American
- Born: January 6, 1993 (age 33) Kaunas, Lithuania

Sport
- Sport: Track, Triathlon
- Event(s): Mile, Cross country events, Triathlon
- College team: Oregon

Achievements and titles
- Personal best(s): Mile: 3:59.71; 2-mile: 8:29.46; Indoor 5000-m: 14:06.78
Medal record
Men's triathlon
ITU Triathlon World Championships
Gold medal – first place	2011 Beijing	Junior

Lukas Verzbicas (born Lukas Veržbickas, January 6, 1993 in Kaunas, Lithuania) is an American triathlete. Once a prominent high school track and cross country runner, Verzbicas set the U.S. high school national record in the two mile with a time of 8:29.46, in June 2011 after graduating from high school the month prior. He was also the fifth American high school boy to run a sub four-minute mile, running 3:59.71 a week after setting the national record in the two mile.

== Early life ==
Verzbicas was born in Kaunas, Lithuania and moved to the US with his mother and stepfather at age nine. The family lived in Orland Park, Illinois where Verzbicas attended Carl Sandburg High School, graduating in May 2011. Verzbicas graduated at age 18 after attending high school for just 3 years. His mother is a former Lithuanian record-holder at 3,000 m.

== Running career ==
=== High school ===
In May 2009, Verzbicas won the Pan American Triathlon Confederation Junior Championships. In September 2009, Verzbicas won the Duathlon World Junior Championships. In December 2009, he won the Foot Locker Cross Country Championships in a time of 15:08. In June 2010, Verzbicas won the 2010 Adidas High School Boys' Dream Mile in New York City in a time of 4:04.

In the fall of 2010, Verzbicas finished 4th in the ITU World Junior Triathlon Championships. Shortly afterwards, Verzbicas won the 2010 IHSA Class 3A state championship in the 3 mile run with a time of 13:53.7, only 3 seconds off the state record held by world cross country champion and three time Olympian Craig Virgin. In December 2010, he won the Foot Locker Cross Country Championships a second time, this time in a time of 14:59 as well as the Nike Cross Nationals invitational in a time of 15:59 becoming the first runner to win both FLCC and NXN in the same year and the third to win FLCC in consecutive years.

In an interview following his 2010 FLCC victory, Verzbicas stated that after high school he would pursue either running or triathlon, not both, and that his decision would be based primarily on his running performance during the remainder of his senior year. In February 2011, Verzbicas signed a national letter of intent to run for the University of Oregon beginning in the fall of 2011. Verzbicas told the Chicago Tribune he had a passion for running which he didn't have for triathlon.

In March 2011, at the New Balance Indoor National meet, Verzbicas won the 5000 meters (14:06), the 2 mile (8:40), and the mile (4:10) becoming the first high school runner to win all three events at the national meet. His 5000-meter time of 14:06 stood as the high school indoor national record until February 11, 2012 when Edward Cheserek ran a 13:57 at the 105th Millrose Games.

In June 2011 at the Prefontaine Classic in Eugene, Oregon, Verzbicas set a national high school record in the 2 mile with a time of 8:29.46, breaking the old record of 8:34.23 set by German Fernandez in 2008. One week after setting the 2 mile record, Verzbicas won the 2011 Adidas High School Boys' Dream Mile in New York City in a time of 3:59.71 joining Jim Ryun, Tim Danielson, Marty Liquori, and Alan Webb as the only American high school runners to break four minutes in the mile. At the time, his 3:59.71 set a new Lithuanian mile outdoor record.

Following the 2011 Track season, Verzbicas planned a brief return to triathlon in an attempt to win the World Junior Championships in honor of his friend and teammate Kevin McDowell who was undergoing chemotherapy following a diagnosis of Hodgkin's lymphoma. In July 2011, Verzbicas won the Pan American Triathlon Confederation Junior Championships and in September 2011 went on to win the ITU World Junior Championships in Beijing.

=== Collegiate ===
In November 2011, after running in only two cross country races for the University of Oregon, Verzbicas announced that he would be leaving the school to pursue a career in triathlon with the hopes of making a future US Olympic team. The timing of his decision was controversial as he left the cross country team just before a critical national qualifying race. In an interview with the Chicago Tribune, Verzbicas stated that his earlier comments regarding his lack of passion for triathlon had been made before he was a world champion and that he believed he could make more of an impact on the sport of triathlon than he could on running.

== Professional triathlon career ==
In 2012, Verzbicas planned to attend classes at the University of Colorado Colorado Springs in Colorado Springs, CO as member of USAT's Elite Triathlon Academy before making the decision to leave school and train full-time as a professional triathlete at the Olympic Training Center. In January 2012, citing an unspecified broken bone, Verzbicas failed to finish his first professional triathlon race, the Pan American Championships in La Paz, Argentina. However, by June 2012 Verzbicas’s performances improved, defeating established professionals and olympic qualifiers to win the 2012 Dallas ITU Triathlon Pan American Cup in Dallas, TX, as well as the 2012 Banyoles ITU Triathlon World Cup in Barcelona, Spain.

On July 31, 2012, Verzbicas was involved in a bicycle accident while training in Colorado Springs. Bob Babbit of Competitor Magazine reported via Twitter that Verzbicas had a broken collarbone, blood in his lungs and was scheduled for back surgery the following day. The results of the surgery were released on August 14, 2012 and indicated that Verzbicas had a broken collarbone, 2 fractured vertebrae, and a collapsed lung. Verzbicas suffered post-op paralysis in his right leg but slowly regained motor control in it.

=== 2013 ===
Since the injury, Verzbicas became able to train again and competed in the 2013 Carlsbad 5000.

=== 2016 ===
Verzbicas retired from competitive running in 2016 due to the injuries suffered in 2012.
