= Four-minute mile =

Completion of a mile race in under 4 minutes

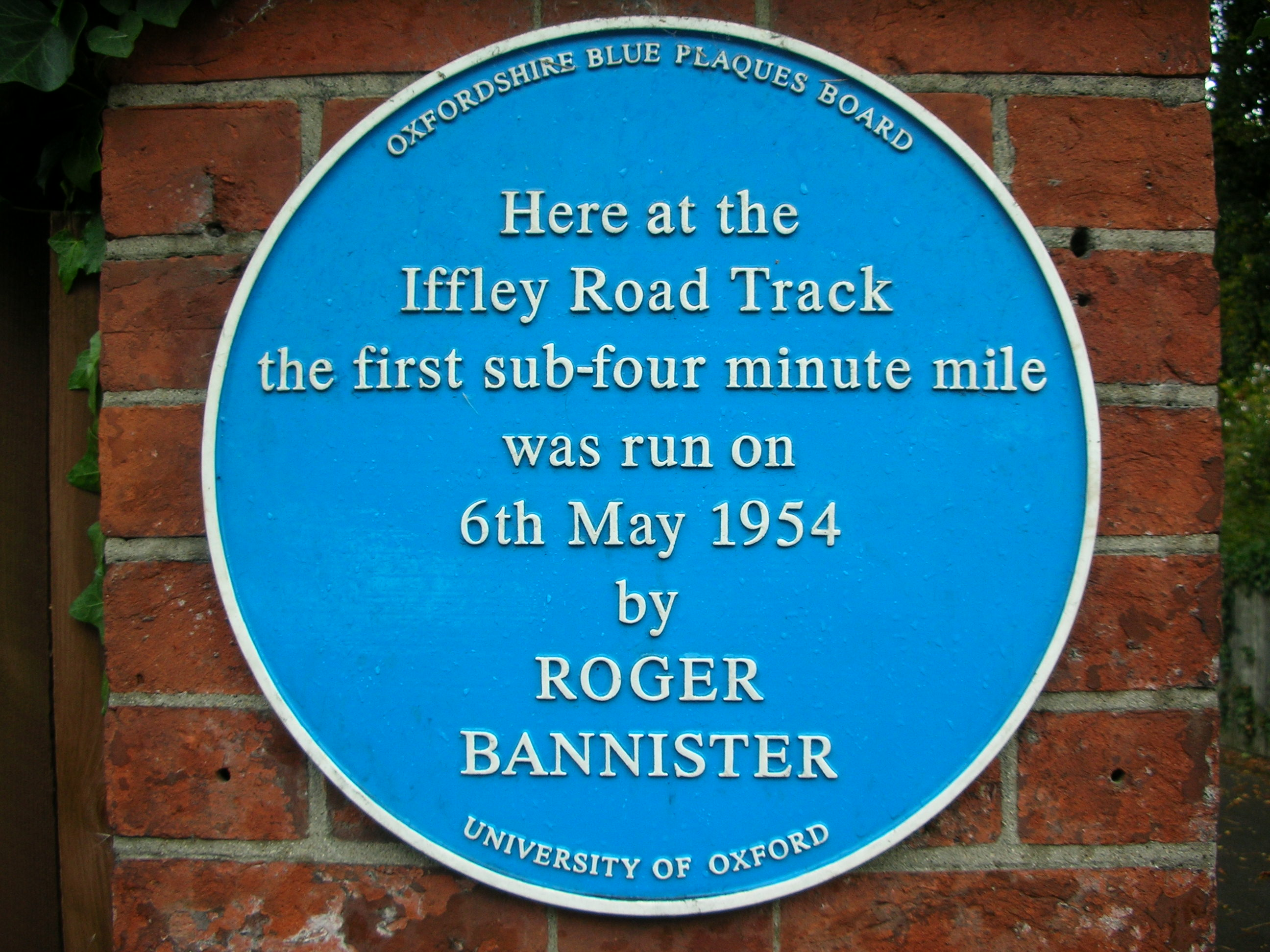
Blue plaque recording the first sub-four-minute mile, run by Roger Bannister on 6 May 1954 at Oxford University's Iffley Road Track

A four-minute mile is the completion of a mile run (1.609 km) in four minutes or fewer, translating to an average speed of 15 miles per hour (24.1 km/h).

The first four-minute mile is usually attributed to the English athlete Roger Bannister, who ran it in 1954 at age 25 in 3:59.4. The mile record has since been lowered by 17.34 seconds. According to World Athletics statistics, the "four-minute barrier" has been broken by just over 2,000 athletes. The record for the fastest time stands at 3:42.66, achieved by the Scottish athlete Josh Kerr, at age 28, in 2026. There has not yet been a woman who has run a four-minute mile.

It is a standard for male professional middle-distance runners in several countries.

== Record holders ==
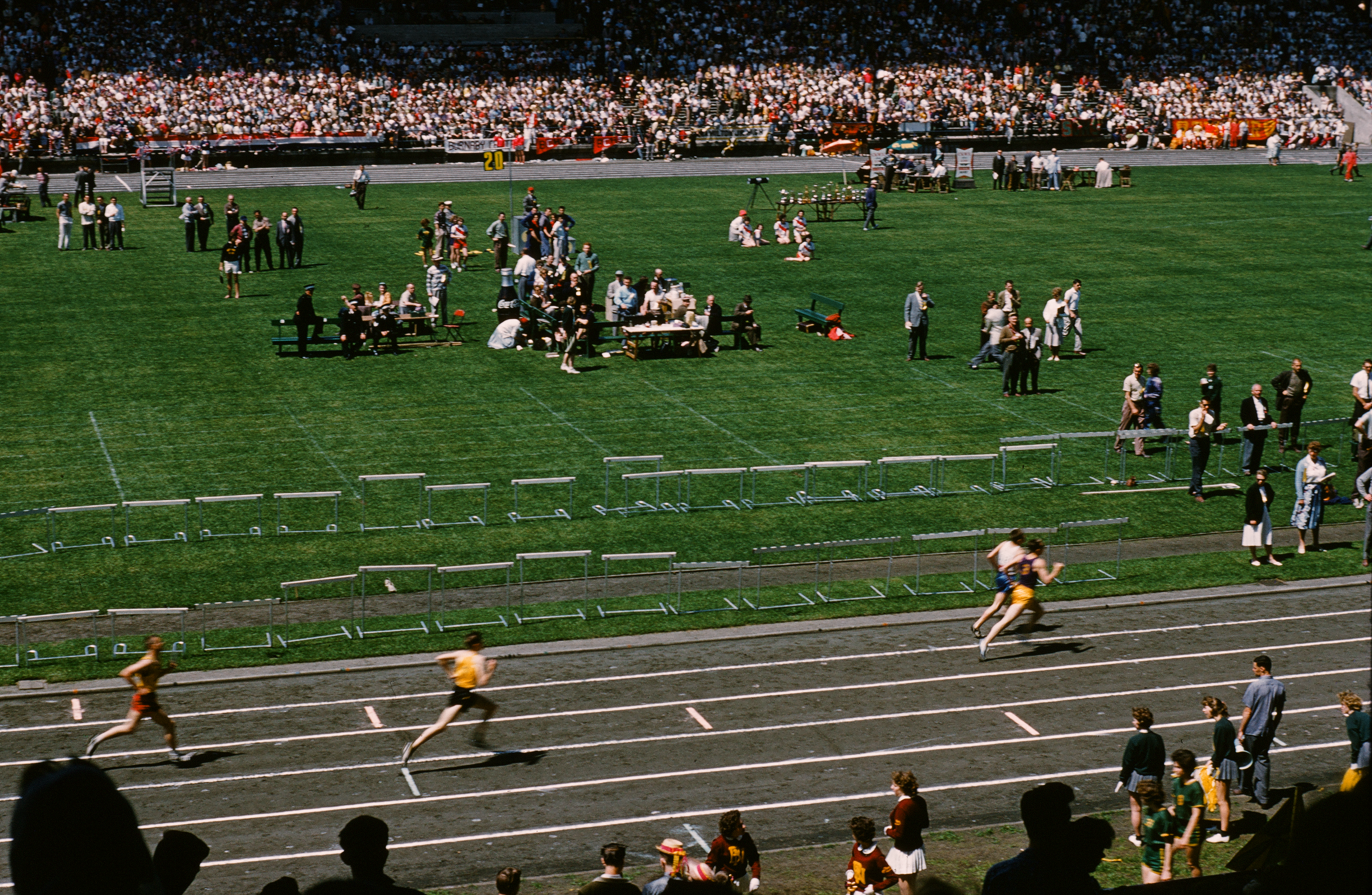
Bannister and Landy racing in Vancouver, August 1954

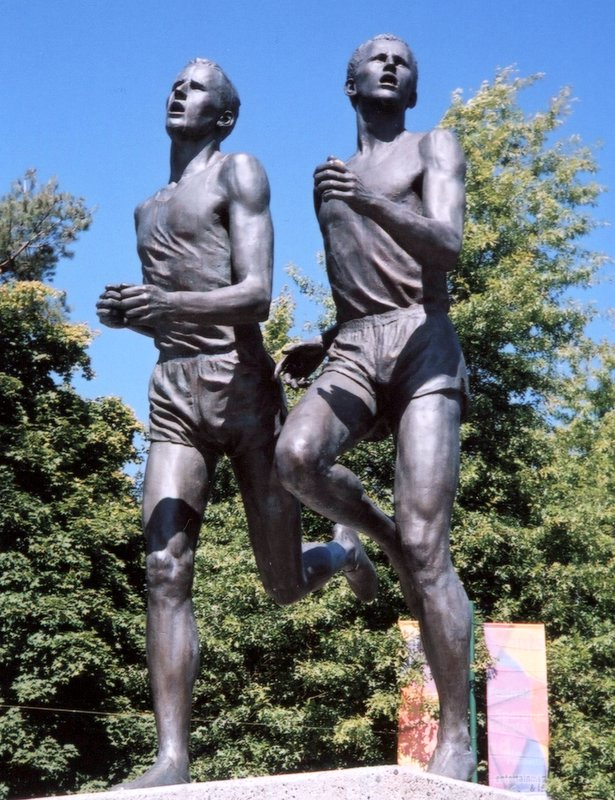
Statue in Vancouver commemorating the "Miracle Mile" between Bannister and Landy

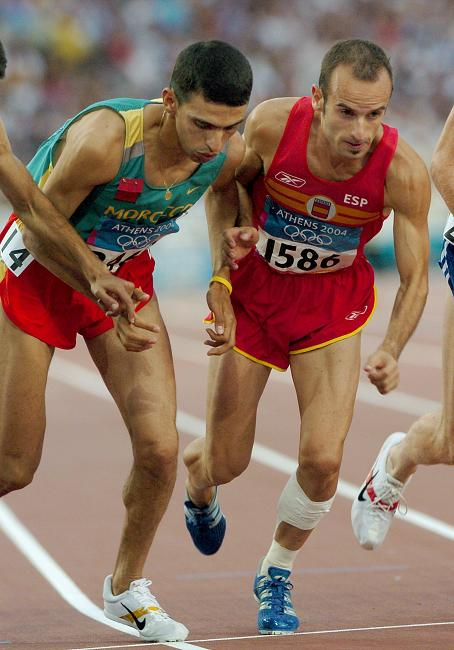
Former mile world record holder Hicham El Guerrouj (left) at the start of a race

On 30 October 1863, William Lang ran a downhill mile time trial in 4:02 in Newmarket, Suffolk, England. Due to the downhill slope, the time would not have been valid for record-keeping but nonetheless remained the fastest mile ever run until 1943, and began speculation about when the first sub-four-minute mile would be performed.

The four-minute barrier was first broken on 6 May 1954 at Oxford University's Iffley Road Track, by British athlete Roger Bannister, with the help of fellow runners Chris Chataway and Chris Brasher as pacemakers.

On 21 June 1954, at an international meet at Turku, Finland, John Landy of Australia became the second man, after Bannister, to achieve a sub-four-minute mile. He achieved a world record time of 3:57.9, ratified by the IAAF as 3:58.0 owing to the rounding rules then in effect. He held this record for more than three years.

Two months later, on 7 August, during the 1954 British Empire and Commonwealth Games hosted in Vancouver, B.C., Landy and Bannister both ran the distance of one mile in under four minutes. The race's end is memorialised in a photo, and later a statue, of the two, with Landy looking over his left shoulder, just as Bannister is passing him on the right. Landy thus lost the race. The statue was placed in front of the Pacific National Exhibition entrance plaza. Bannister won in 3:58.8, with Landy 0.8 seconds behind at 3:59.6.

New Zealand's John Walker ran 135 sub-four-minute miles during his career, became the first person to run over 100 sub-four-minute miles, and with a 3:49.4 performance in August 1975 became the first man to run the mile under 3:50. American Steve Scott has run the most sub-four-minute miles, with 136. Algeria's Noureddine Morceli was the first under 3:45. Morocco's Hicham El Guerrouj ran a time of 3:43.13 in Rome in 1999, a record which held until 2026 when British runner Josh Kerr ran a time of 3:42.66 in London.

An illustration of the progression of performance in the men's mile is that, in 1994, forty years after Bannister's breaking of the barrier, the Irish runner Eamonn Coghlan became the first man over the age of 40 to run a sub-four-minute mile. Because Coghlan surpassed the mark indoors and before the IAAF validated indoor performances as being eligible for outdoor records, World Masters Athletics still had not recognised a sub-4-minute-mile performance as a record in the M40 division. Many elite athletes made the attempts to extend their careers beyond age 40 to challenge that mark. Over 18 years after Coghlan, that was finally achieved by Britain's Anthony Whiteman, running 3:58.79 on 2 June 2012.

In 1997, Daniel Komen of Kenya ran two miles in less than eight minutes, doubling up on Bannister's accomplishment. He did it again in February 1998, falling just 0.3 seconds behind his previous performance of 7:58.61. On 9 June 2023, Norwegian runner Jakob Ingebrigtsen bested that time, running 7:54.10 to become only the second individual to run two miles in less than eight minutes.

=== Junior ===
Jakob Ingebrigtsen is also the former record-holder for the youngest runner to run a four-minute mile, having run 3:58.07 at the Prefontaine Classic in May 2017, when he was 16 years and 250 days old. Indoor world champion Yomif Kejelcha of Ethiopia ran 4:57.74 in an indoor 2000 m race on 28 February 2014, at age 16 years and 212 days. The run averages to a pace of 3:59.58 per mile for the 1.24-mile race.

On 19 March 2025, New Zealander Sam Ruthe, junior to both Kejelcha and Ingebrigtsen, became the youngest ever and first 15-year-old runner to break four minutes for the mile. At a local meet at Mount Smart Stadium, Ruthe ran the mile in 3:58.35 at the age of 15 years and 341 days, later improved to a time of 3:48.88 at 16 years old.

In 1964, America's Jim Ryun became the first high-school runner to break four minutes for the mile, running 3:59.0 as a junior and a then American record 3:55.3 as a high-school senior in 1965. Tim Danielson (1966) and Marty Liquori (1967) also came in under four minutes, but Ryun's high-school record stood until Alan Webb ran 3:53.43 in 2001. Ten years later, in 2011, Lukas Verzbicas became the fifth high-schooler under four minutes. In 2015, Matthew Maton and Grant Fisher became the sixth and seventh high-schoolers to break four minutes, both running 3:59.38 about a month apart. Webb was the first high schooler to run sub-4 indoors, running 3:59.86 in early 2001. On 6 February 2016, Andrew Hunter significantly improved upon Webb's mark, running 3:58.25 on the same New York Armory track and 3:57.81 two weeks later. Hunter achieved the 4-minute mile mark outdoors later in the season at the Prefontaine Classic. At that same meet Michael Slagowski ran his second sub-4-minute of the season. Reed Brown dipped under the barrier on 1 June 2017, running the 4th fastest high school mile time ever recorded in a race: 3:59.30. In 2020, Leo Daschbach clocked 3:59.54 during the Quarantine Clasico, moving to ninth on the all time list.

=== Women ===
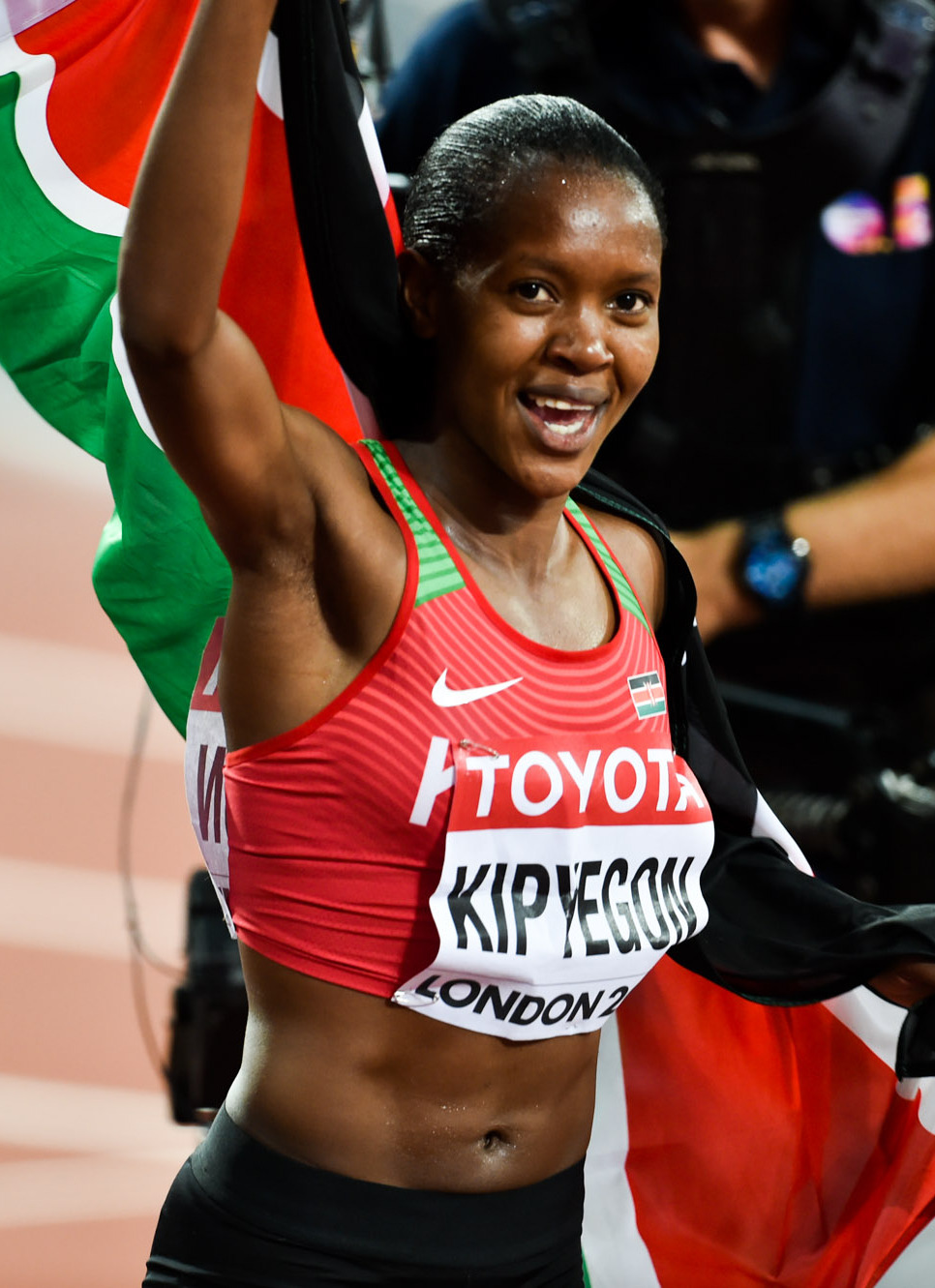
Faith Kipyegon, current women's world record holder for the mile

No woman has yet run a four-minute mile. The women's world record is currently at 4:07.64, set by Faith Kipyegon of Kenya at the Diamond League meeting in Monaco on 21 July 2023. An earlier women's world record, 4:12.56 set by Svetlana Masterkova of Russia on 14 August 1996 at Zürich, stood for almost 23 years: Masterkova became the first woman to run the mile in less than 4 minutes and 15 seconds.

Kipyegon's run has led some to speculate that the first women's sub-four minute mile may come within the 21st century. Some organizations such as the Fast Forest project have considered the 4:30-minute mile barrier to be a roughly equivalent benchmark for women, though there are fewer women's sub-4:30 runners than there are men's sub-4:00 runners.

Kipyegon attempted to become the first woman to run a sub-four-minute mile at a meeting in Paris on 26 June 2025. Her attempt, titled Breaking4, was assisted by 'the next generation of super shoes' and male pacers to help break the barrier. Her final unadjusted time was 4:06.91, but the event was not record-eligible.

== Possible other claims ==
A number of people are claimed to have beaten the four-minute mile before Bannister.

=== James Parrott (1770) ===
Some (notably Olympic medallist Peter Radford) contend the first successful four-minute mile was run by James Parrott on 9 May 1770. He ran the 1-mile, west-to-east, length of Old Street to finish somewhere within the grounds/building of Shoreditch Church. Timing methods at this time were—after the invention of the chronometer by John Harrison—accurate enough to measure the four minutes correctly, and sporting authorities of the time accepted the claim as genuine. Old Street has an approximate 3.4 metres (11 ft) downward fall, with intermittent gentle undulations. Neal Bascomb notes in The Perfect Mile that "even nineteenth-century historians cast a skeptical eye on the account."

=== Weller Run (1796) ===
On 10 October 1796, The Sporting Magazine reported that a young man called Weller, who was one of three brothers, "undertook for a wager of three guineas to run one mile on the Banbury road [Oxford], in four minutes, which he performed two seconds within the time." This is equivalent to £308 in 2025 yet about 5 months' worth of typical rural labourer pay at the time. By the late 1700s, a mile could be routinely measured to within a few inches; watches, thanks to John Harrison, could measure 4 minutes to within 0.0009 sec (i.e. gain or lose 10 seconds a month), and after about 1750 the mass production of highly accurate watches was well underway.

=== Big Hawk Chief (1876 or 1877) ===
During his time as a Pawnee runner, Big Hawk Chief possibly became the first person documented to run a sub-four-minute mile. The details of the event, as chronicled by Army Officer, Captain Luther North, clocked the mile at 3 minutes and 58 seconds.

=== Glenn Cunningham (1920s) ===
It is also reputed that Glenn Cunningham achieved a four-minute mile in a workout in the 1920s. In addition to being unsubstantiated, a workout run would not count as a record.

== In popular culture ==
In 1955 Putnam & Co. Ltd. published Roger Bannister's account of the events in First Four Minutes. This was later adapted as "The Four-Minute Mile" by Reader's Digest in 1958.

In the 17 November 1956 Season 2 Episode 26 Whole No. 65 of Science Fiction Theatre entitled "Three Minute Mile", a scientist (Marshall Thompson) attempts to create a super athlete (Martin Milner).

In the 1971 film The Omega Man, protagonist Robert Neville, as played by Charlton Heston, claims to have run a mile in 3 minutes and 50 seconds.

In 1988, the ABC and the BBC co-produced The Four Minute Mile, a miniseries dramatization of the race to the four-minute mile, featuring Richard Huw as Bannister and Nique Needles as John Landy (who was simultaneously pursuing the milestone). It was written by David Williamson and directed by Jim Goddard.

In 2004, Neal Bascomb wrote a book entitled The Perfect Mile about Roger Bannister, John Landy, and Wes Santee, portraying their individual attempts to break the four-minute mile and the context of the sport of mile racing. A second film version (entitled Four Minutes) was made in 2005, starring Jamie Maclachlan as Bannister.

Also in 2004, a 50 pence coin was minted in the United Kingdom to celebrate the 50th anniversary of Bannister running the four-minute mile. There were 9,032,500 minted in 2004. The coin was re-struck in 2019 as part of the '50 years of the 50p coin' set released by the Royal Mint, only for collector sets.

In 2005, ESPN released a television adaptation of the event called "Four Minutes" featuring Jamie Maclachlan as Roger Bannister and Christopher Plummer as his wheelchair-using coach, Archie Mason.

In June 2011, the watch used to time the original event was donated by Jeffrey Archer to a charity auction for Oxford University Athletics Club; it sold for £97,250.

In July 2016, the BBC broadcast the documentary Bannister: Everest on the Track, The Roger Bannister Story with firsthand interviews from Bannister and various other figures on the first sub-4-minute mile.

== See also ==
- Mile run world record progression
- 10-second barrier
- Two-hour marathon
