= Academy of Natural Sciences (disambiguation) =

Academy of Natural Sciences usually refers to the Academy of Natural Sciences of Drexel University.

Academy of Natural Sciences may also refer to:

- Crater Academy of Natural Sciences, a high school in Oregon, United States
- Swiss Academy of Natural Sciences
