= Owen Powell (runner) =

American middle-distance runner

Sport
- Sport: Athletics
- Events: Middle-distance running, Cross country running

Achievements and titles
- Personal bests: 800 m: 1:46.63 (Seattle, 2025); 1500 m: 3:36.49 (Portland, 2025); Mile: 3:56.66 (Boston, 2025); Indoors; 1500 m: 3:40.62 (Boston, 2025) AU20R; Mile: 3:56.66 (Boston, 2025); 3000m: 8:04.83 (Seattle, 2025)

Owen Powell is an American middle-distance runner.

== Early and personal life ==
Powell grew up in Eugene, Oregon until he was eleven years-old. His parents Maurica and Andy Powell both ran collegiately at Stanford University and later became coaches at the University of Oregon and then the University of Washington. He has a younger brother, Jake. He attended Mercer Island High School in Washington and only started running seriously late in his freshman year at high school, before later committing to attend the University of Washington in 2025.

== Career ==
In September 2024, Powell set the national 3-mile high school record time at the Woodbridge Invitational, finishing ahead of Josiah Tostenson. He ran a 4:02.04 outdoor mile personal best in 2024 and was named the 2023-24 Gatorade Washington Boys Track & Field Player of the Year.

He broke Gerry Lindgren's Washington state high school mile record that had been held for 61 years until Powell ran 4:01.14 at the 2025 New Balance Indoor Grand Prix on February 2, 2025. He then ran a 3:57.74 indoor mile on February 15, 2025 at the Husky Invitational in Washington, before running a second under Hobbs Kessler's indoor American high school record in running 3:56.66 a week later in Boston, Massachusetts. His split time for the 1500 metres in the race was 3:40.62, with only Alan Webb, Jim Ryun and Colin Sahlman having run faster than Powell for the mile outdoors as high schoolers.

He lowered his personal best in the 800 meters to 1:46.63 in finishing runner-up to Cooper Lutkenhaus at the Brooks PR Invitational on June 8, 2025. He ran 3:36.49 in a professional 1500 metres race at the Portland Track Festival on June 15, 2025 in Portland, Oregon, for the second fastest American high school time in history, behind only the national high school record of Hobbs Kessler. He was invited to race in the International Mile at the 2025 Prefontaine Classic in Eugene, Oregon in June 2025. On 7 August 2026, he had a top-ten finish in the 3000 metres at the 2026 World Athletics U20 Championships in Eugene.
