= Big Hawk Chief =

Pawnee soldier and runner

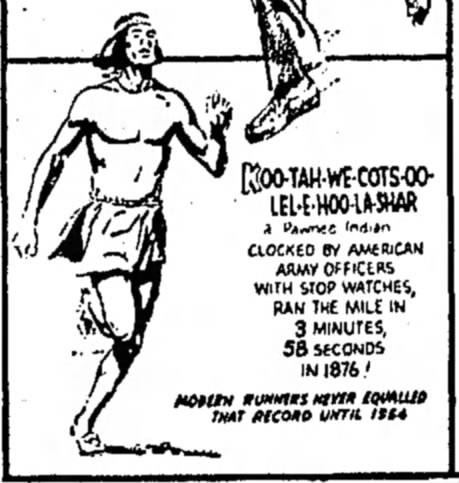
- Drawing of Hawk Chief in The Arizona Republic from 1976

Personal information
- Born: Kutawikucu Resaru; Kootahwecotsoo Lelehoolashar; Kootaweecotsoolelehooshar; Black Hawk Chief; Koot-tah-we-coots-oo Lel-le-hoo-la-shar; 1853
- Died: 1895 or 1893 (aged 39–40) Pawnee County, Oklahoma

Kutawikucu Resaru, better known as Hawk Chief (c. 1853–1893), was a Pawnee Scout for the United States Army. He is best known to be possibly the first to run a sub-four minute mile during his time in service, in 1876 or 1877. His run is not largely chronicled and many believe the credit for the historic first sub-four mile belongs to Roger Bannister of England or an earlier claimant. Hawk Chief was a citizen of the Pawnee Nation, and served in the Plains Indian Wars as a Pawnee Scout. His legacy as "the fastest man alive" is one shrouded in controversy despite first hand accounts of his run.

== Early life ==
While little is known about Hawk Chief's childhood, there are documents that tell us his birth name and year, as well as the year of his death. Kutawikucu Resaru, the name given to Hawk Chief, was born in about 1853. He died at the age of about 42 in 1895. As a Čawî’ Pawnee he was born in the South Band town where Lashara, Nebraska now sits. Despite the lack of information surrounding his early life, it is known that he joined the armed forces to be a runner.

== Career ==
Native Americans were an important part of the American military, ever since its beginnings. Many of these natives were employed or recruited in order to help assist in colonist/American conflicts with other Native Americans. Native scouts and runners were at their heights during "instances as the Pequot War from 1634–1638, the Revolutionary War, as well as in War of 1812." Some, such as Hawk Chief, even served during the Plains Indian Wars. He enlisted in the Pawnee Scout Battalion in 1876. Although they peaked early on, the use of Indian scouts ended in the year 1947, with the retirement of the last active scout.

During his time as a Pawnee runner in 1876 or 1877, Hawk Chief was documented to run a sub-four-minute mile. The details of the event, as chronicled by Army Officer, Captain Luther North, clocked the mile at 3 minutes and 58 seconds. In his account, North describes the event.

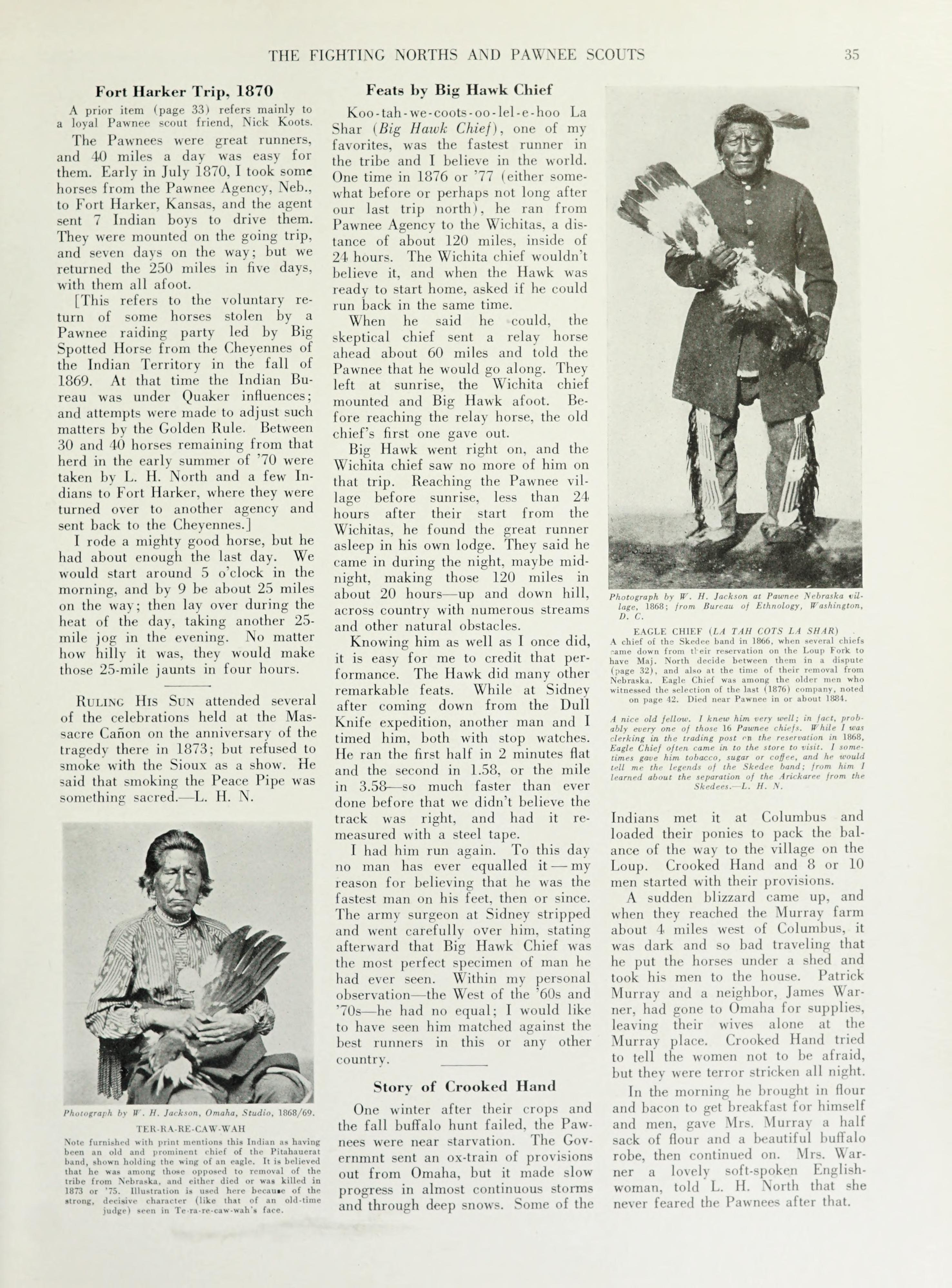
Page 35 of The fighting Norths and Pawnee scouts, the 1932 book where the claim was first published

"Big Hawk Chief... one of my favorites, was the fastest runner in the tribe, and I believe the world... while at Sidney after coming down from the Dull Knife expedition, another man and I timed him, both with stop watches. He ran the first half in 2 minutes flat and the second in 1:58 or the mile in 3.58 ― so much faster than ever done before that we didn’t believe the track was right, and had it measured with a steel tape. I had him run again. To this day [written in 1930] no man has ever equaled it ― my reason for believing that he was the fastest man on his feet, then or since. The army surgeon at Sidney stripped and went carefully over him, stating afterward that Hawk Chief was the most perfect specimen of man he had ever seen."

North's account of the event serves as a primary source on an event whose significance is often disputed. In having an official report of such a major event, North's retelling of the event is sometimes regarded as proof that Hawk Chief was the first man to run a sub-four-minute mile.

Hawk Chief was also documented to have run from the Pawnee Agency to the Wichita Agency, a distance of 120 miles (190 km), in 24 hours. When his statement was doubted, he rested for one day and ran back the other direction to prove it, this time doing it in 20 hours while being monitored. By the 1930s, the 24-hour run record was held by Arthur F. H. Newton, who had covered 152 miles (245 km) at approximately the same pace as Hawk Chief's run (on pace for 126 miles in 20 hours).

== Controversy ==
Despite having accounts of his historic run, Hawk Chief is not always regarded as having been the first man to run mile in less than four minutes. This honor is often accredited to British athlete Roger Bannister. He ran his own sub-four mile at a track meet at Oxford, clocking his time at 3 minutes, 59.4 seconds on May 6, 1954.

== Legacy ==
His identity as a Native American, and the ways in which his achievements are ignored, have largely impacted the involvement of Natives in sports. Native American athletes are frequently passed over, mostly due to the lack of information accessible on them.

The Hawk Chief Run, a five-mile race in Pawnee, is held annually in Big Hawk Chief's honor. The race had no entry fees and no gendered divisions, with the top three finishers being granted "peace medals" and the last-place finisher being given a lantern. Big Hawk Chief's great-grandson, Amos Goodfox Jr., was involved in the planning of the event in the 1980s.

== See also ==
- Four-minute mile#Possible other claims
