= Gary Martin (runner) =

American middle distance runner (born 2003)

Personal information
- Nationality: American
- Born: December 23, 2003 (age 22)
- Education: Archbishop Wood High School

Sport
- Country: United States
- Sport: Track and field, cross country
- Event: 1500m–3000m
- University team: Virginia Cavaliers
- Coached by: Vin Lananna

Achievements and titles
- Personal bests: *All information from athlete's World Athletics profile unless otherwise noted.: 800 m: 1:47.21 (West Long Branch 2026); 1500 m: 3:32.03 (Eugene 2025); Mile: 3:48.82i (New York City 2025); 3000 m: 7:36.09i (Boston 2024); 5000 m: 13:05.57 (Boston 2025)

Gary Martin (born December 23, 2003) is an American track and field athlete who competes for the Virginia Cavaliers.

== Career ==
Born in Philadelphia, Pennsylvania, Martin attended Archbishop Wood High School in Warminster, Pennsylvania. In 2022, as a senior, he became the second high school athlete to break four minutes in the mile without a rabbit, running 3:57.98. During the same season, he set the Penn Relays high school mile record, with a time of 4:01.04. He also won state titles in cross country, the 800 meters and 1600 meters, setting a state record in the latter.

Martin matriculated to the University of Virginia, where he competes for the Cavaliers. According to Martin, he picked the University of Virginia for its team culture and support system.

In November 2024, Martin won the ACC Cross Country Championship over Parker Wolfe and Ethan Strand, where he set a course record of 22:17.6 over the 8 kilometer distance. He placed 13th in the NCAA Division I Cross Country Championships.

In February 2025, in the Wanamaker Mile at the Millrose Games, Martin ran the second fastest mile for a collegian in history, with a time of 3:48.82, which was nearly a six-second improvement from his previous personal best of 3:54.73.

In March 2025, at the NCAA Division I Indoor Championships, Martin anchored the University of Virginia distance medley relay team to an NCAA title. He split 3:48.12 for 1600 meters.
