= Tim Danielson =

American middle-distance runner

Personal information
- Full name: Timothy Ralph Danielson
- Nationality: United States
- Born: 3 December 1947 Chula Vista, California, U.S.
- Died: November 26, 2024 La Mesa, California, U.S.
- Education: Brigham Young University
- Occupation: Former middle-distance runner
- Years active: 1965–1971

Sport
- Country: United States
- Sport: Track and field
- Position: Middle-distance runner
- Events: Mile, Two-mile
- College team: Brigham Young University
- Retired: Yes

Achievements and titles
- Personal best: Mile: 3:59.4 (1966)
- Criminal information
- Conviction: First-degree murder
- Penalty: 50 years' imprisonment

Details
- Victims: Ming Qi
- Date: June 2011
- Weapon: Rifle

Timothy Ralph Danielson (December 3, 1947 – November 26, 2024) was an American former middle-distance runner and convicted murder.

== Murder of Ming Qi ==
On June 16, 2011, Danielson was charged in the murder of Ming Qi. Ming Qi, a substitute teacher, had divorced Danielson in 2008, but the two continued to live together at their home in Lakeside, California. Both had children from previous marriages.

After the shooting, Danielson sent an email to his sister-in-law stating that he had killed Ming Qi and was attempting suicide by carbon monoxide poisoning. He was subsequently hospitalized and arrested.

Danielson pleaded not guilty to the murder of his former wife. During the trial, he claimed the murder was a suicide attempt as a result of his use of Chantix. Danielson had shot Ming Qi with a rifle six times.

In May 2014, Danielson was convicted of first-degree murder and faced a sentence of 50 years to life in prison.

== High school ==
Danielson was the second, and currently one of only 21 U.S. high school athletes, to run the mile in under four minutes. While running for Chula Vista High School in Chula Vista, California, Danielson became the second high school 4-minute miler when he ran a 3:59.4 mile at San Diego's Balboa Stadium on June 11, 1966. His mile time puts him sixth on the all-time high school miler list, behind Alan Webb's 3:53.43 (2001), Jim Ryun's 3:55.3 (1965), Drew Hunter's 3:58.25, Reed Brown's 3:59.3 (2017), Matthew Maton's 3:59.38 (2015), and Grant Fisher's 3:59.38 (2015), and was the fastest time ever run by a California high school student until Colin Sahlman from Newbury Park High School ran 3:58.81 in 2022.

He won the mile race at the CIF California State Meet in 1965 with a time of 4:08.0 and again the next year with a time of 4:07.0. He won the Golden West Invitational High School meet two-mile race in 1966 in a time of 8:55.4. He was Track and Field News "High School Athlete of the Year" in 1966.

== College ==
After high school Danielson attended Brigham Young University, where he competed for the track team for a year but never managed to break four minutes for the mile again. He was in the race at the 1967 National Championships where Jim Ryun set the world record at 3:51.1. After running second for much of the race, he faded near the end, finishing 8th in just over 4 minutes. During that same race, Marty Liquori became the third high school 4 minute miler, a step ahead of him. Danielson's career direction changed. Ryun said "I lost track of Tim after that." He married Carolyn Mooers in February 1968, their first son was born in June, all distractions at the same time he was attempting to qualify for the 1968 Olympics. Before professionalism was allowed "In those days, if anyone married they were finished." said Liquori.

== Personal ==
Danielson began working as an engineer for GKN Aerospace Engine Products in El Cajon, California in 1971. He married his third wife, Ming Qi in 2006; they divorced in 2008.

He died on November 26, 2024 of cancer.

Awards
Preceded by Jim Ryun	Track & Field News High School Boys Athlete of the Year; 1966	Succeeded by Jerry Proctor
