= Marty Liquori =

American middle-distance runner

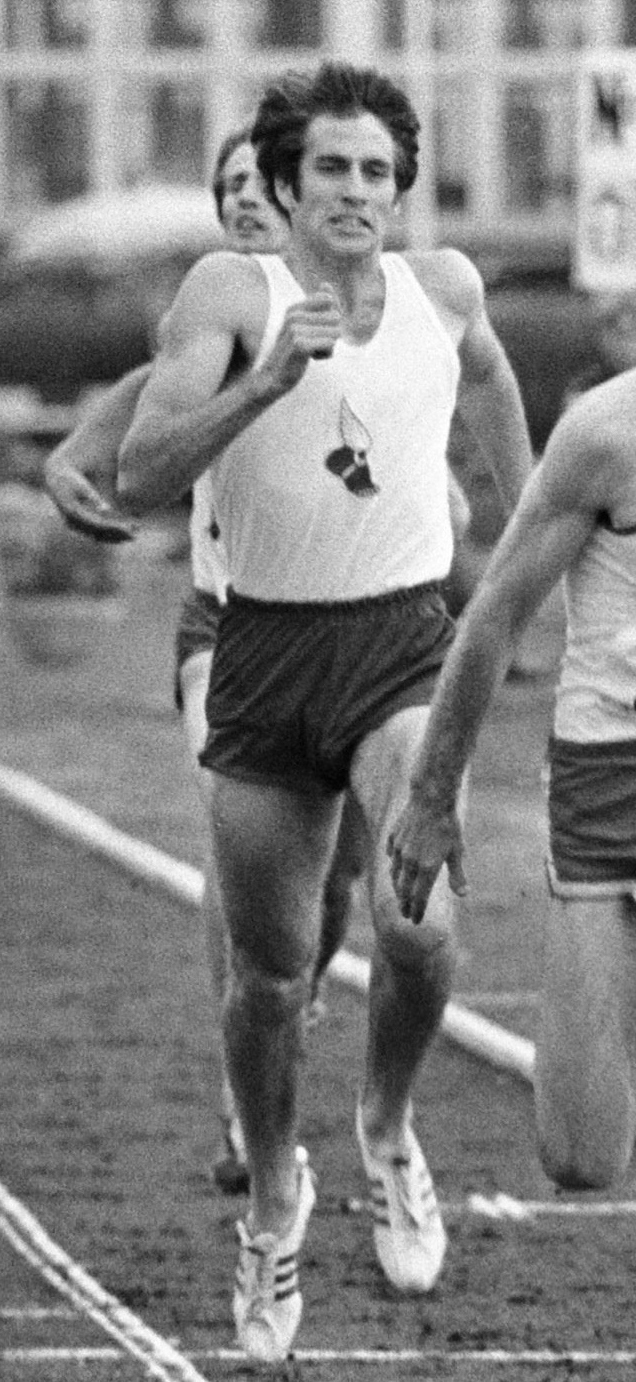
- Liquori in 1970

Personal information
- Born: September 11, 1949 (age 76) Montclair, New Jersey, U.S.
- Height: 6 ft 0 in (1.83 m)
- Weight: 154 lb (70 kg)

Sport
- Sport: Middle distance running
- Club: Villanova Wildcats
Medal record
Representing the United States
Pan American Games
Gold medal – first place	1971 Cali	1500 metres
IAAF World Cup
Silver medal – second place	1977 Düsseldorf	5000 metres

Martin William Liquori (born September 11, 1949) is a retired American middle distance athlete.

Liquori rose to fame when he became the third American high schooler to break the four-minute mile by running a 3:59.8 in 1967, three years after Jim Ryun first did it.

== Biography ==
He grew up in Cedar Grove, New Jersey and attended Essex Catholic High School. After high school, Liquori enrolled at Villanova University. There he was coached by Jumbo Elliott.

Liquori made the U.S. Olympic team in 1968 as a nineteen-year-old freshman. He reached the finals of the 1,500 meter run but suffered a stress fracture and finished 12th. He was the youngest person ever to compete in the final.

In 1969, he finished second to Ryun in the NCAA indoor mile, then won the NCAA and AAU outdoor mile championships by turning the tables on Ryun and beating him. He repeated the AAU outdoor in 1970 and had his best year in 1971, winning the NCAA and AAU outdoor titles, and a gold medal in the 1,500 m at the Pan-American Games. Also in 1969 and 1971, he was ranked number 1 in the world for 1500 meters/mile. In 1977 he was ranked number 1 in 5000 meters and set a U.S. record of 13:15.1 while finishing second to Miruts Yifter in the inaugural World Cup.

On May 16, 1971, Liquori lowered his personal best to 3:54.6 in the Dream Mile in Philadelphia and beat Ryun by a few steps. But Liquori was injured later that year and didn't return to competition until 1973. In 1975, he ran a personal best 3:52.2 in the mile, finishing second to Filbert Bayi (who broke Ryun's world record in that race by 0.1 second with a 3:51.0), and set a United States record of 8:17.12 in the 2 mile. Also in 1975, he won the British AAA Championships title in the 5,000 metres event at the 1975 AAA Championships.

Liquori retired from competitive distance running in 1980.

He has written an autobiography, On The Run, and he also wrote Guide to the Elite Runner and Home Gym Workout. He was a founder of The Athletic Attic Footwear chain in 1972. Liquori lives in Gainesville, Florida. Liquori did commentary at the Munich, Montreal, Sidney, Barcelona, Seoul and Athens Olympic Games and the New York and Boston Marathons. Liquori produced and hosted “Running and Racing” on ESPN for 14 years and Fitness Adventures on the Outdoor Life Network. Liquori was diagnosed with chronic lymphocytic leukemia (CLL), which is now in remission. Liquori has been inducted into the New Jersey Sports Hall of Fame, National Track and Field Hall of Fame, Italian American Hall of Fame, National High School Hall of Game, National Distance Running Hall of Fame, USTFCCCA Collegiate Athlete Hall of Fame, and the Cosida Academic All American Hall of Fame.

== Audio interview ==
- TheFinalSprint.com's interview with Olympian Marty Liquori
