= Abraham Alvarado =

American middle-distance runner

Personal information
- Born: 4 August 1995 (age 30)

Sport
- Sport: Athletics
- Event: Middle-distance running

Achievements and titles
- Personal bests: 800m: 1:44.07 (2026); 1500m: 3:33.21 (2025); Mile: 3:52.30 (2026); Indoor; 800m: 1:45.62 (2026); 1500m: 3:36.82 (2020); Mile: 3:53.48 (2025)

Abraham Alvarado (born 4 August 1995) is a middle-distance runner who competed for the United States at the 2023 Pan American Games. He is set to represent Mexico from 3 November 2026.

== Early life ==
Alvarado attended Atwater High School in Atwater, California before attending California State University, Stanislaus and Brigham Young University.

== Career ==
Alvarado placed second in the 800 metres at the 2016 NCAA Division II Outdoor Track and Field Championships, and that year lowered his personal best to 1:46.90 for the distance at the Portland Track Festival. He finished fifth competing for BYU in the 800 metres at the 2018 NCAA Division I Indoor Championships before turning professional later that year.

In 2021, he lowered his 800 metres personal best to 1:46.15 at the Trials of Miles New York City Qualifier. He lowered it again the following month to 1:46.11 at the USATF Showcase. That year he reached the semi-finals of the 800 metres at the US Olympic Trials.

Alvarado competed for the United States at the 2023 Pan American Games in Santiago. He was a pacemaker for the Bowerman Mile run at the 2024 Prefontaine Classic. He qualified for the final of the 800 metres at the 2024 US Olympic Trials, placing eighth overall in a personal best 1:44.90.

Alvarado finished second over 800 metres behind Bryce Hoppel at the 2025 New Balance Indoor Grand Prix in Boston, Massachusetts in February 2025. The following weekend he was a pacemaker as Yared Nuguse set a new world record in the indoor mile at the Millrose Games in New York. In June 2025, he ran a personal best time of 3:33.21 for the 1500 metres at the 2025 BAUHAUS-galan event in Stockholm, Sweden. He was selected as pacemaker for the Bowerman Mile again at the 2025 Prefontaine Classic. He finished second behind Navasky Anderson in the 800 metres at the Sunset Tour Los Angeles on 12 July 2025 in 1:44.47.

He reached the final of the 800 metres at the 2025 USA Outdoor Track and Field Championships in Eugene, Oregon, placing seventh overall in a personal best 1:44.41.

Abraham ran an indoor personal best for the 800 metres of 1:45.62 placing third behind Cooper Lutkenhaus and Handal Roban in Salem, North Carolina in February 2026. Alvarado placed second in 1:44.59 over 800 metres at the LA Track Fest on 23 May 2026. In July, Alvarado ran a personal best 3:52.30 for the mile at the 2026 Prefontaine Classic. On 11 July, Alvarado won the 800 metres with a new personal best 1:44.07 at the Sound Running Sunset Tour.
