= Crater High School =

Location
- 655 N Third Street; Central Point, (Jackson County), Oregon 97502; United States; 42.380431°N 122.921672°W

Information
- Type: Public
- Opened: 1951
- School district: Central Point School District
- Principal: Scott Dippel
- Teaching staff: 62
- Grades: 9-12
- Enrollment: 1388
- Colors: Black, white and orange
- Athletics conference: OSAA Midwestern League 5A
- Mascot: Comet
- Team name: Comets
- Website: chs.district6.org

Crater High School is a public high school in Central Point, Oregon, United States.

== Small School Initiative ==
Beginning in the 2007-2008 school year, a program called the Small School Initiative was established in Crater after a monetary grant from the Bill and Melinda Gates Foundation and the Meyer Memorial Trust. It divided the Crater campus into four smaller, autonomous schools, each with its own principal and staff members. These schools were the Crater Academy of Natural Sciences (CANS), Crater Renaissance Academy (CRA), Crater School of Business, Innovation & Science (BIS), and Crater Academy of Health and Public Services (CAHPS). CANS was closed in 2012. The school remained separated into three small schools until 2024 when CRA, BIS, and CAHPS were also closed and the campus merged into one. The campus is now one school as of the 24-25 school year.

== Academics ==
In 1983, Crater High School was honored in the Blue Ribbon Schools Program, the highest honor a school can receive in the United States.

Crater Students normally come from Hanby Middle School and Scenic Middle School.

== Educational outcomes ==
In 2008, 88% of the Crater Academy of Health & Public Services school's seniors received a high school diploma. Of 75 students, 66 graduated, three dropped out, and six were still in high school in 2009.

In 2008, 86% of the Crater Academy of Natural Sciences school's seniors received a high school diploma. Of 72 students, 62 graduated, three dropped out, two received a modified diploma, and five were still in high school in 2009.

In 2008, 80% of the Crater Renaissance Academy school's seniors received a high school diploma. Of 82 students, 69 graduated, zero dropped out, and ten were still in high school in 2009.

In 2008, 83% of the Crater School of Business Innovation school's seniors received a high school diploma. Of 94 students, 78 graduated, two dropped out, and 14 were still in high school in 2009.

== Notable alumni ==
- Nathan Bittle - college basketball player who plays for the Oregon Ducks
- Bryce Peila (football, track) - currently plays for the Portland AFL Team of the Arena Football League
- Mike Whitehead - 1999 State champion wrestler; retired professional mixed martial artist.
- Tayvon Kitchen track athlete who competes for Brigham Young University. US #1 all-time prep in the 3000 meters (7:55.48)
- Josiah Tostenson track athlete who competes for the University of Washington. US #6 all-time prep in the mile (3:57:47)
