= Shannon Ray =

American sprinter (born 1995)

Personal information
- Nationality: USA
- Born: December 31, 1995 (age 30)
- Home town: New Orleans, Louisiana
- Education: St. Katharine Drexel Preparatory School; University of Mississippi

Sport
- Sport: Athletics
- Event(s): 100 metres 200 metres
- College team: Ole Miss Rebels

Achievements and titles
- National finals: 2015 NCAAs; • 4 × 100 m, 7th; 2020 USA Indoors; • 60 m, 7th
- Personal bests: 100 m: 11.09 (+1.1) (2022); 200 m: 22.82 (+1.7) (2023)
- Updated on December 29, 2023

Shannon Ray (born December 31, 1995) is an American sprinter specializing in the 100 metres and 200 metres. She was a member of the U.S. 4 × 100 m relay at the 2023 Pan American Games, placing 7th.

== Biography ==
Ray is from New Orleans, Louisiana where she attended St. Katharine Drexel Preparatory School. Running on a team with Aleia Hobbs and Mikiah Brisco, Ray won the 4 × 100 m at the 2014 USATF National Junior Olympic Track & Field Championships in a time of 45.81 seconds.

In March 2014, Ray signed with the Ole Miss Rebels track and field program, which she competed for from 2014 to 2018. At the 2015 NCAA Division I Outdoor Track and Field Championships, Ray helped the Ole Miss team qualify for the finals of the 4 × 100 m for the first time, finishing 7th overall.

Ray qualified for her first senior U.S. final at the 2020 USA Indoor Track and Field Championships, placing 7th in the 60 metres.

At the 2021 United States Olympic trials, Ray entered in the 100 m. She ran 11.58 seconds and did not advance from her heat, failing to qualify for the 2021 Olympic team.

In 2022, Ray set a 100 m personal best of 11.09 seconds at the Ed Murphey Classic American Track League meeting. At the 2022 USA Outdoor Track and Field Championships, her heat was the only one of four to be run into a headwind, and Ray was one place out from qualifying for the semi-finals.

In 2023, Ray ran at the Kip Keino Classic in the 200 m. Although her race was not originally slated to include U.S. champion Sha'Carri Richardson, Richardson ended up joining the race because she claimed that race organizers had pushed her out of the 100 m so as not to interfere with Shelly-Ann Fraser-Pryce (who in the end did not compete due to injury). Ray finished third to Richardson and Kyra Jefferson in a new personal best of 22.82 seconds.

Ray was selected to represent the United States at the 2023 Pan American Games in the 4 × 100 m. The team advanced from the semi-finals, but in the finals the relay baton was dropped and the team had to jog to the finish in a time of 1:01.30.

== Statistics ==
=== Personal bests ===
| Event | Mark | Place | Competition | Venue | Date | Ref |
|---|---|---|---|---|---|---|
| 100 metres | 11.09 (+1.1 m/s) | (silver) (heat #2) | Ed Murphey Classic | Memphis, Tennessee | July 30, 2022 | |
| 200 metres | 22.82 A (+1.7 m/s) | 3rd place, bronze medalist(s) | Kip Keino Classic | Nairobi, Kenya | May 13, 2023 | |
