= Alan Webb (runner) =

American middle-distance runner

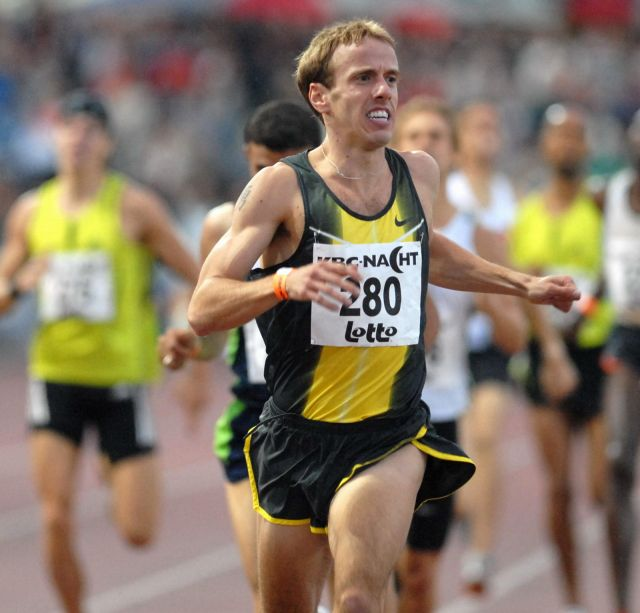
- Webb at the KBC Night of Athletics in 2007

Personal information
- Born: January 13, 1983 (age 43) Ann Arbor, Michigan, U.S.
- Height: 5 ft 9 in (175 cm)
- Weight: 145 lb (66 kg)

Sport
- Country: United States
- Sport: Athletics/Track, Mid-distance running
- Events: 800 meters, 1500 meters, Mile, 5000 meters, 10,000 meters
- College team: Michigan Wolverines
- Club: Nike
- Coached by: Scott Raczko
- Now coaching: Ave Maria University

Achievements and titles
- Olympic finals: 2004 Athens; 1500 m, 25th (h)
- World finals: 2005 Helsinki; 1500 m, 9th 2007 Osaka; 1500 m, 8th
- Personal bests: Outdoor; 800 m: 1:43.84 (Heusden 2007); 1500 m: 3:30.54 (Paris 2007); Mile: 3:46.91 (Brasschaat 2007); 3000 m: 7:39.28 (Eugene 2005); 2-mile: 8:11.48 (Eugene 2005); 5000 m: 13:10.86 (Berlin 2005); 10,000 m: 27:34.72 (Palo Alto 2006)
Medal record
Men's athletics
Representing the United States
USA Outdoor Championships
Gold medal – first place	2007	1500 m
Gold medal – first place	2005	1500 m
Gold medal – first place	2004	1500 m

Alan Webb (born January 13, 1983) is an American former track and field athlete and former triathlete. He held the American national record in the mile, with a time of 3 minutes 46.91 seconds, from July 2007 to September 2023. He holds the record for the fastest mile run by an American high schooler, with a time of 3:53.43, set in 2001. Webb represented the United States at the 2004 Summer Olympics in the men's 1500-meters race. He competed professionally for Nike until the end of 2013. He retired after the 2014 Millrose Games.

He currently serves as head coach for the Ave Maria University's cross country and track and field teams in Ave Maria, Florida.

== Early life ==
Webb was born January 13, 1983, in Ann Arbor, Michigan.

== Track career ==
=== High school ===
He attended South Lakes High School in Reston, Virginia. In 1999, he broke Jim Ryun's national sophomore mile record of 4:07.8 by running 4:06.94, while beating Nathan Conley by one second. During the fall season of his senior year, Webb placed second at the 2000 Foot Locker Cross Country Championships behind Dathan Ritzenhein.

At the New Balance Games in January 2001, Webb's mile time of 3:59.86 at New York City's Armory made him the first American high schooler ever to run a sub-four minute mile indoors. Webb's time broke the previous American indoor high school record of Thom Hunt — a 4:02.7 — as well as Hunt's indoor HS AR in the 1500 m (3:46.6), as Webb came through the 1500 mark in 3:43.27. Webb's record was surpassed fifteen years later by Andrew Hunter from Loudoun Valley High School in Virginia with a time of 3:58.25 set on the same track.

Four months later, at the age of 18 years, 4 months, and 14 days, on May 27, 2001, at the Prefontaine Classic, Webb ran a mile in 3:53.43 to shatter Ryun's 36-year-old national high school record of 3:55.3, which placed him first on the list of high school students who have run a four minute mile. En route, Webb passed the 1500 mark in 3:38.26 to take down Ryun's 37-year-old high school AR of 3:39.0 set in 1964.

Webb followed up his run at Prefontaine by winning the Virginia State High School 800 m title in 1:47.74 to become the fourth-fastest high schooler ever at that distance. He was Track and Field News "High School Athlete of the Year" in 2001.

At the end of his senior year, Webb appeared as a guest on an episode of Late Show with David Letterman.

=== Collegiate ===
Following his high school achievements, Webb went on to run both cross country and track for the University of Michigan. During the fall cross country season, he won several meets, including the Wolverine Interregional and the Big Ten Championships (both 8 kilometer races) in times of 25:12 and 23:19.9, respectively. After claiming runner-up at the NCAA Great Lakes Regional to Boaz Cheboiywo, he finished in eleventh place at the NCAA Championships with a time of 29:38 for the 10 kilometer race to earn All-American honors.

After redshirting the indoor track season, Webb won the Big Ten championship in the 1500 m run during the outdoor season, clocking a time of 3:49.27 to win the title. Webb competed in this race at the NCAA Outdoor Track and Field Championships a few weeks later, finishing in fourth place with a time of 3:43.23.

Shortly after the completion of the outdoor season, Webb decided to leave the university to turn professional and return to his high school coach and mentor Scott Raczko. He continued his collegiate education at George Mason University.

=== Post-collegiate/professional ===
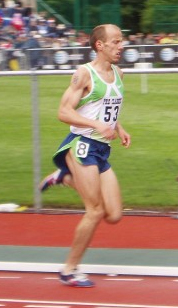
Alan Webb at the 2006 Prefontaine Classic

After turning professional in 2002, Webb competed for Nike. In 2004, he became an Olympian by winning the 1500 m in the U.S. Olympic Trials. He was later eliminated in the first round of Olympic competition in Athens.

In 2005, Webb won another national title at 1500 m and made it to the Finals of the World Championships in Helsinki in that event. He also set personal records at every distance from the 1500 to the 5000 m, setting the American record at 2 miles along the way.

In 2007, Webb once again won the national championship in the 1500 m run, surging past Bernard Lagat in the final 50 meters for the title. He then finished 8th in the final of the 1500 m at the World Championships in Osaka, Japan. On July 6, 2007, Webb won the IAAF Golden League meet 1500 m race in Paris in a lifetime best of 3:30.54, third fastest on the American list. On July 21, 2007, at a meet in Brasschaat, Belgium, Webb broke the American record in the mile. His time of 3:46.91 bested the 25-year-old record of 3:47.69 run by Steve Scott. It remained the American record for more than 16 years, until Yared Nuguse broke it in September 2023 with a time of 3:43:97. He ended the year with a victory in the New York Fifth Avenue Mile.

On July 6, 2008, Webb failed to qualify for the Beijing Olympics in the 1500 m after finishing 5th in the US Olympic Trials in Eugene, Oregon with a time of 3:41.62.

After many disappointing results since breaking the American mile record, Webb decided in August 2009 to move to Portland, Oregon to train with coach Alberto Salazar. At the time, Salazar already coached Kara Goucher, Galen Rupp, Amy Yoder Begley, and Dathan Ritzenhein, and Webb was Salazar’s first 1500 m runner. In March 2011, Webb decided to leave Salazar on amicable terms.

In 2010, Webb underwent surgery for an Achilles tendon injury and returned at the Fifth Avenue Mile in September, finishing in fourth behind defending champion Andrew Baddeley.

After his split with coach Alberto Salazar, Webb decided to be coached closer to home under the University of Virginia's Jason Vigilante.

Webb returned to Portland to join Jerry Schumacher's group and was focused on the 5000 m & 10,000 m, and eventually the marathon.

Webb announced his retirement from track running on February 15, 2014 following the 2014 Millrose Games Wannamaker Mile.

== Coach ==
In 2013, Webb began as a volunteer assistant coach at Portland State University for cross country. In July 2019, Webb became an assistant cross country coach and distance coach at the University of Arkansas at Little Rock., he finished off coaching at Catholic High School in the fall of 2021 for cross country alongside Coach Jennifer Found. He now coaches cross country and track & field at Ave Maria University, a private Catholic university in Florida.

== Personal life ==
Alan Webb married Julia Rudd in October 2010, who also enjoys running and is an assistant coach for a high school cross country team. A convert to Catholicism and LIFE Runners member, Alan and Julia have four daughters, Joanie, Paula, Gabriella (Gabby), and Bridget.

== Select races by event ==
800 m

Competition	Result	Time	Location	Date
Virginia High School State Championship	1	1:47.74	Newport News, Virginia	2000-06-01
Seville Round B	1	1:46.53	Seville, Spain	2004-06-05
Grand Prix	2	1:45.80	Malmö, Sweden	2007-07-03
KBC Night of Athletics	1	1:43.84	Heusden, Belgium	2007-07-28
Meeting Citta Di Padova	8	1:48.34	Padua, Italy	2010-09-03

1500 m

Competition	Result	Time	Location	Date
Prefontaine Classic	2	3:38.26	Eugene, Oregon	2001-07-18
Olympic Trials Finals	1	3:36.13	Sacramento, California	2004-07-18
Olympic Qualifying Round 1	9	3:41.25	Athens, Greece	2004-08-20
USATF Outdoor Championships	1	3:41.97	Carson, California	2005-06-25
World Track and Field Championships	9	3:41.04	Helsinki, Finland	2005-08-10
Rieti	3	3:32:52	Rieti, Italy	2005-08-28
USATF Outdoor Championships	1	3:34.82	Indianapolis, Indiana	2007-06-24
Meeting Gaz de France Paris St. Denis	1	3:30.54	Paris, France	2007-07-06
Olympic Trials Finals	5	3:41.62	Eugene, Oregon	2008-07-06
Notturna di Milano	5	3:36.21	Milan, Italy	2010-09-09
Melbourne Track Classic	3	3:37.82	Melbourne, Australia	2011-03-03
Oxy Invitational	7	3:37.26	Los Angeles	2012-05-18
Prefontaine Classic	10	3:45.59	Eugene, Oregon	2013-05-31
American Milers Club High Performance Series Meet #3	10	3:42.88	Indianapolis, Indiana	2013-06-15

Mile

Competition	Result	Time	Location	Date
Nike Prefontaine Classic	1	3:50.83	Eugene, Oregon	2004-06-19
Aviva London Grand Prix	4	3:50.73	London, United Kingdom	2004-07-30
Bislett Games	4	3:48.92	Oslo, Norway	2005-07-29
Prefontaine Classic	11	4:00.87	Eugene, Oregon	2006-05-28
Boston Indoor Games (Indoors)	1	3:55.18	Boston, Massachusetts	2007-01-27
Drake Relays	1	3:51.71	Des Moines, Iowa	2007-04-28
Atletiek Vlaanderen	1	3:46.91	Brasschaat, Belgium	2007-07-21
Nike Prefontaine Classic	10	3:55.99	Eugene, Oregon	2009-06-07
Prefontaine Classic	11	3:59.47	Eugene, Oregon	2012-06-02

3000 m

Competition	Result	Time	Location	Date
Nike Prefontaine Classic	3	7:39.28 (en route)	Eugene, Oregon	2005-06-04

2 Mile

Competition	Result	Time	Location	Date
Nike Prefontaine Classic	2	8:11.48	Eugene, Oregon	2005-06-04
Adidas Track Classic	6	8:33.92	Carson, California	2006-05-21
Prefontaine Classic	9	8:23.97	Eugene, Oregon	2007-06-10

5000 m

Competition	Result	Time	Location	Date
Penn Relays	1	13:46.31	Philadelphia	2004-04-29
Penn Relays	1	13:30.25	Philadelphia	2005-04-28
Berlin Golden League	8	13:10.86	Berlin, Germany	2005-09-04
Payton Jordan Cardinal Invitational	21	13:37.68	Palo Alto, California	2013-04-28

10000 m

Competition	Result	Time	Location	Date
Payton Jordan Cardinal Invitational	1	27:34.72	Palo Alto, California	2006-04-30

Cross Country

Competition	Result	Time	Distance	Location	Date
USA Cross Country Championships	8	11:31	4 km	Indianapolis, Indiana	2004-02-07
USA Cross Country Championships	4	35:21	12 km	Indianapolis, Indiana	2004-02-08
USA Cross Country Championships	6	11:48.3	4 km	Vancouver, Washington	2005-02-12

== Personal records ==
=== Outdoors ===
Distance	Mark	Date	Location
800 m	1:43.84	2007-07-28	Heusden, Belgium
1,000 m	2:20.32	2005-06-11	New York City
1,500 m	3:30.54	2007-07-06	Paris
Mile	3:46.91	2007-07-21	Brasschaat
3,000 m	7:39.28	2005-06-04	Eugene, Oregon
2 miles	8:11.48	2005-06-04	Eugene, Oregon
5,000 m	13:10.86	2005-09-04	Berlin
10,000 m	27:34.72	2006-04-30	Palo Alto

=== Indoors ===
Distance	Mark	Date	Location
1,000 m	2:23.68	2001-03-03	VA AAA Championships
1,500 m	3:41.93	2004-02-14	Fayetteville, Arkansas
Mile	3:55.18	2007-01-27	Boston(Boston Indoor Games)
3,000 m	7:47.19	2005-01-28	BU Invitational
2 miles	8:45.19	2001-03-11	Nike Indoor Classic

=== Cross country ===
Distance	Mark	Date	Location
4,000 m	11:31	2004-02-07	Indianapolis
10,000 m	29:38	2001-11-19	Greenville
12,000 m	35:21	2004-02-08	Indianapolis

== See also ==
- Middle distance track event
- Nike, Inc.

Awards
Preceded by none	USA Track & Field Youth Athlete of the Year; 2001	Succeeded by Sanya Richards
