= New Balance Games =

- Date: Third weekend in January
- Location: Manhattan, New York City, United States
- Event type: Track and field
- Website: New Balance Indoor Grand Prix

The New Balance Games was an annual indoor track and field meet which was held in late January at the Fort Washington Avenue Armory. It was first held in Manhattan, a neighbourhood in New York City.

The competition is part of National Federation of State High School Associations's New Balance Nationals Indoor and attracts high caliber athletes, including Olympic and World medalists.

After New Balance moved to Boston and the Armory was rebranded with Nike, the meet was renamed to the U.S. Army Officials Hall of Fame Invitational in 2023.
