= Tayvon Kitchen =

American long-distance runner (born 2006)

Personal information
- Born: 18 August 2006 (age 20)

Sport
- Sport: Athletics
- Events: Long-distance running, Cross country running

Achievements and titles
- Personal bests: 1500m: 3:41.42 (2026); Indoors; 1500m: 3:42.91 (2025); Mile: 3:59.61 (2025); 3000m: 7:36.23 (2026); 5000m: 13:19.17 (2025)

Tayvon Kitchen (born 18 August 2006) is an American middle-, long-distance and cross country runner who competes for Brigham Young University.

== Career ==
From Oregon, Kitchen attended Mae Richardson Elementary and Crater High School in Central Point. In 2023, Kitchen won the Oregon 5A state individual cross country title and placed fourth at the Nike Cross Regionals Northwest. At the Husky Classic in February 2024, Kitchen improved his personal best by seven seconds over 3000 metres, running 8:12.84.

He placed fifth at the 3-Mile Sweepstakes at Woodbridge Invitational in September 2024. In February 2025, competing indoors at the Terrier DMR Challenge held at Boston University, he ran 3:59.61 and moved to seventh on the US high school all-time indoors list for the mile run. That month, he ran 7:55.48 for the 3000 metres in Seattle to break Nico Young's American high school record. Kitchen won the 2025 New Balance Indoor Nationals over 5000 metres, with a time of 14:01.14. In May, Kitchen won the Oregon Class 5A 3000 metres state championships with a time of 7:58.92.

As a freshman at BYU, he qualified for the 2025 NCAA Cross Country Championships and placed 32nd overall, after leading the race in the early stages. Kitchen moved to eighth on the NCAA all-time list for the 3000 metres with a time of 7:36.23 on 13 February in Boston, Massachusetts at the BU Valentine Classic. It was the fastest 3000m ever run by an American teenager, indoors or out, surpassing Hobbs Kessler's mark set in Boston in 2023. That month, he was part of the winning BYU medley relay at the Big 12 Indoor Championship. He placed eighth in 13:47.29 in the 5000m on 13 March at the 2026 NCAA Indoor Championships. He also had a top ten finish the following day in the 3000 metres.
