= Celera Barnes =

American sprinter (born 1998)

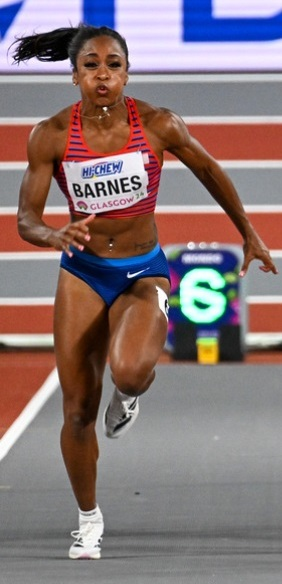
- Barnes competing in Glasgow in 2024

Personal information
- Nationality: American
- Born: 2 December 1998 (age 27) Ventura, California
- Education: University of Southern California '22 Masters in Medical Sciences; University of Kentucky '21 Kinesiology
- Height: 5 ft 3 in (160 cm)

Sport
- Sport: Athletics
- Event: Sprint
- Team: Adidas; 2022-Present

Achievements and titles
- Personal bests: 60m: 7.09 (Albuquerque, 2024); 100m: 10.94 (Eugene, 2022)
Medal record
Women's track and field
Representing United States
World Relays
Gold medal – first place	2024 Nassau	4×100 m relay
NACAC Championships
Silver medal – second place	2022 Freeport	100 m
Gold medal – first place	2022 Freeport	4x100 m relay

Celera Barnes (born 2 December 1998) is an American track and field athlete who competes as a sprinter.

== Biography ==
=== Early life and education ===
Barnes attended St. Bonaventure High School in Ventura, California. She has Filipino ancestry. She graduated from the University of Kentucky before transferring to the University of Southern California for grad school.

=== Career ===
In August 2022, at the 2022 NACAC Championships in Freeport, Bahamas she won the silver medal in the 100 meters in 11.10s behind the Jamaican Shericka Jackson, and won a gold medal in the 4x100m relay. That year, she ran a wind assisted 10.82 100m at the Texas Relays. She also finished third behind Sha'Carri Richardson and Elaine Thompson-Herah in Luzerne, in 11.40 seconds for the 100 metres.

Barnes finished third at the American National indoor Championships in Albuquerque, New Mexico in February 2024. She was selected for the 2024 World Athletics Championships in Glasgow, Scotland and qualified for the semi-finals.

In April 2024, she was selected as part of the American team for the 2024 World Athletics Relays in Nassau, Bahamas. In May 2024, she finished third in the 100 metres at the 2024 Doha Diamond League.

She won the 60 metres title at the 2025 USA Indoor Track and Field Championships. She was selected for the 2025 World Athletics Indoor Championships in Nanjing in March 2025. She finished fourth in 11.16 seconds in the 100 metres at the 2025 Meeting International Mohammed VI d'Athlétisme de Rabat, part of the 2025 Diamond League, in May 2025.

=== Circuit performances ===
Grand Slam Track results
Slam	Race group	Event	Pl.	Time	Prize money
2025 Philadelphia Slam	Short sprints	200 m	7th	22.89	US$12,500
2025 Philadelphia Slam	Short sprints	100 m	6th	11.21	US$12,500
