= Josiah Tostenson =

American long-distance runner

Sport
- Sport: Athletics
- Events: Middle-distance running, Long-distance running, Cross country running

Achievements and titles
- Personal bests: 800 m: 1:48.83 (Philadelphia, 2025); 1500 m: 3:36.85 (Portland, 2025); Mile: 3:57.47 (Boston, 2025); 3000m: 7:57.42 (Seattle, 2025) 5000m: 14:15.94 (Los Angeles, 2025) Indoors; 1500 m: 3:41.32 (Boston, 2025); Mile: 3:57.47 (Boston, 2025); 3000m: 8:03.31 (Boston, 2025)

Josiah Tostenson is an American middle- and long-distance and cross country runner.

== Early life ==
Tostenson is from Oregon, and attended Jewett Elementary School and Crater High School in Southern Oregon. His brother Jantz also competed as a runner and his older sister Gracie was a college runner at Boise State University. In 2016 and 2017 he won the Sams Valley Mini Marathon, setting a course record of 18:34 in 2017.

== Career ==
As a junior high schooler at Crater, Tostenson won all-American honours at the NXN, and moved to number one in the American high-school list for the 3000 metres and fourth in the mile run. In September 2024, Tostenson finished 0.20 seconds outside the national 3-mile high school record time of Owen Powell at the Woodbridge Invitational. Tostenson signed a name, image and likeness (NIL) contract with New Balance in December 2024.

In February 2025, competing indoors at the Terrier DMR Challenge held at Boston University, Tostenson ran 3:57.47 for the mile run as Powell set the American high record of 3:56.66 and Tostenson moved to second on the all-time indoors list. Tostenson concluded his 2025 indoor season with a win in the Championship 2 Mile at the New Balance Nationals Indoor Championships.

Tostenson competed at the Portland Track Festival over 1500m on 15 June 2025 whilst a high school student, competing against professionals, placing 12th in 3:36.85, moving to third on the American high school all-time list behind Owen Powell and Hobbs Kessler for the distance. Having set new state records in the 1500m race (3:36.85 seconds), the mile (3:59), the 1600 metres (3:57.39) and the 4 x mile relay (16:54.8) Tostenson concluded his high school career and began to attend the University of Washington in 2025.
