= Drew Hunter =

American middle-distance runner

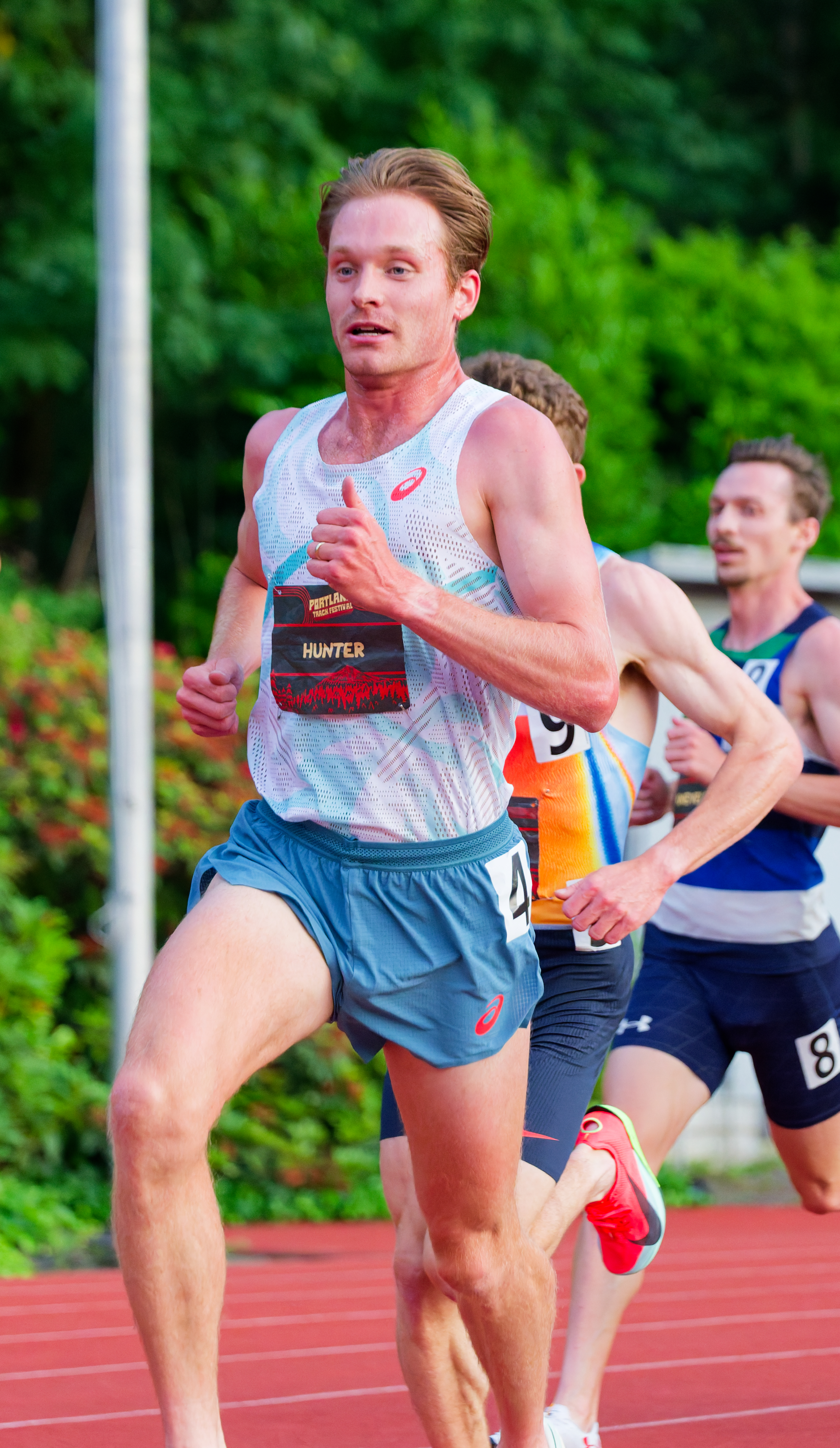
- Drew Hunter in 2025

Personal information
- Born: September 5, 1997 (age 28) Loudoun County, Virginia, United States
- Height: 5 ft 11 in (180 cm)
- Weight: 141 lb (64 kg)

Sport
- Sport: Track, cross country
- Events: 1500 meters, mile
- Club: Asics
- Turned pro: 2016

Achievements and titles
- Highest world ranking: 16th U20
- Personal bests: 800m: 1:48.57; 1500m: 3:33.41; Mile: 3:54.80; 3000m: 7:39.77; 5000m: 13:05.60; 10000m: 27:24.49
Medal record
Men's athletics
Representing United States
NACAC Championships
Gold medal – first place	2025 Freeport	5000 m
- Updated on May 20, 2024

Andrew James Hunter (born September 5, 1997) is an American middle-distance runner from Purcellville, Virginia, who competes professionally for Asics. He set the national indoor mile record for high school boys in 2016. He was named Gatorade National Cross-Country Runner of the Year in 2016. He committed to the University of Oregon on November 12, 2015 but instead decided to pursue a professional career by signing a 10-year contract with Adidas on July 8, 2016.

== Running career ==
=== High school ===
Hunter attended Loudoun Valley High School. He won the High School Boys 3000-meter race as a sophomore at the Penn Relays Carnival in 2014. He went on to set the national sophomore class record in the 3000 metres event at 8:16.31. In the fall of 2014, Hunter placed 4th at the Foot Locker Cross Country Championships. Hunter won the New Balance National Indoor two-mile national title in a time of 8:48.22. He started his outdoor season with a 4:07 victory at the Penn Relays, becoming the first high school athlete since Olympian Matt Centrowitz to own both the high school boys 3k and mile Penn Relays titles. Hunter achieved a season best of 4:02.36 at the Adidas Dream Mile at the Adidas Grand Prix. He broke Grant Fisher's meet record at the Brooks PR 2-mile championship, where he set a personal best of 8:42.51 in the event. He ended his 2015 track season with a 2nd-place finish behind collegian Blake Haney in the junior boys 1500m at the USATF Outdoor Championships, closing the last 400 meters of that race in 53.10 seconds. Hunter set a personal best of 14:20 in the 5000 meters at the Third Battle Invitational. He set a course record of 14:26 at the Foot Locker South regional meet before winning his first Foot Locker National title in 14:55.7. In his indoor debut, Hunter broke the high school boys national indoor 3k record with a time of 7:59.33 at the Camel City Elite meet in Winston-Salem, North Carolina. He followed up that performance with another national record in the high school boys indoor mile, running 3:58.25 at the Armory Track and Field Invitational. In so doing, he became the 8th High School Athlete to break 4 minutes in the mile and the second high school athlete to break 4 indoors. Two weeks later, Hunter broke his own record, clocking 3:57.81 in the mile at the Millrose Games. Hunter's 2016 outdoor season was also successful. He ran a 4:00.73 split in the 1600m to bring the Loudoun Valley boys the win in the DMR at the Penn Relays in 10:00.01. He returned to his best event, again breaking 4 minutes, running 3:58.86 at the Pre Classic.

=== Professional ===
In July 2016 Hunter signed a 10-year contract for Adidas. On August 5, 2016, he placed 6th overall in the men's mile race at the 2016 Sir Walter Miler, finishing in 3:57.15. It was his first race since graduating from high school. On February 11, 2017, Hunter participated in the NYRR Millrose Games Wanamaker Mile, where he placed seventh in 3:56.80. On February 23, 2019, Hunter won the USA Indoor Track & Field Championships two mile with a meet record time of 8:25.29. After suffering a series of injuries starting with a ruptured plantar fascia at the 2019 U.S. Track & Field Championships, Hunter did not compete in the 2020 USA Olympic Track & Field Trials. However, he returned to form later that year, winning the USA Road 5k Championships on November 6, 2021, in a time of 13:53.

In the 2025 USA Outdoor Track and Field Championships, Hunter stayed in the lead pack in the 5,000 meter race. On the last 200 meters he surged to take fourth place in the race won by Cole Hocker.

== Personal life ==
Hunter is the fourth of nine children in his family. Five of his siblings are adopted; two from Haiti and three from China. His father and mother are both also runners. His father, Marc Hunter, was a national-class distance runner for Cleveland State University, owner of a personal best of 13:36 for 5000 meters. His mother, Joan Hunter ran at West Virginia University and has won multiple masters indoor national titles. Marc and Joan coached Alan Webb during his freshman year at South Lakes High School in Reston, Virginia. Hunter is currently completing his undergraduate degree at University of Colorado Boulder.

With his wife, Hunter has two daughters: Ella and Rose.

== Race results table ==
Year	Championship Record	Event	Venue	Place	Time
2025	USA Outdoor Championships	5 km	Hayward Field	4th	13:27.16
2024	USA Olympic Trials	10 km	Hayward Field	4th	27:53.35
2024	USA Cross Country Championships	10 km	Richmond, Virginia	9th	29:38
2023	USA Outdoor Championships	1500 m	Hayward Field	8th	3:36.51
2023	USA Indoor Championships	1500 m	Albuquerque convention center	10th	3:49.35
2022	USA Outdoor Championships	1500 m	Hayward Field	H3 7th	3:39.55
2022	USA Indoor Championships	3000 m	The Podium	5th	7:49.87
2019	USA Outdoor Championships	5000 metres	Des Moines, Iowa	5th	13:29.19
2019	USA Indoor Championships	2 mile run	Ocean Breeze Athletic Complex	1st	8:25.29
2019	USA Cross Country Championships	10 km	Apalachee Regional Park	9th	29:37
2018	IAAF Continental Cup	1500 m	Městský stadion (Ostrava)	7th	3:43.95
2018	USA Outdoor Championships	1500 m	Drake Stadium	6th	3:43.97
2017	USA Outdoor Championships	1500 m	Hornet Stadium (Sacramento)	11th	3:46.37
2015	USA Junior Outdoor Championships	1500 m	Hayward Field	2nd	3:58.48
