= Jim Ryun =

American politician and track athlete (born 1947)

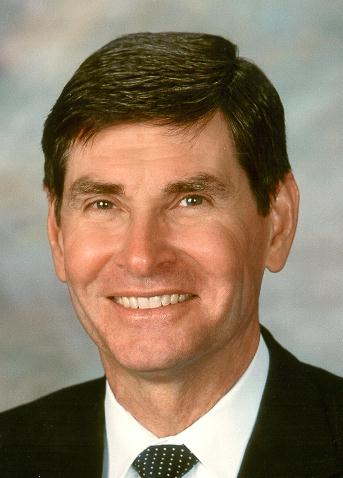

Member of the U.S. House of Representatives from Kansas's 2nd district
- In office November 27, 1996 – January 3, 2007 (Note: Ryun's official service begins on the date of his post-special election appointment, while the House was adjourned sine die until the start of the next Congress on January 3, 1997.)
- Preceded by: Sam Brownback
- Succeeded by: Nancy Boyda

Personal details
- Born: James Ronald Ryun; April 29, 1947 (age 79) Wichita, Kansas, U.S.
- Party: Republican
- Spouse: Anne Ryun (m. 1969)
- Education: University of Kansas (BA)
- Sports career
- Height: 188 cm (6 ft 2 in)
- Weight: 76 kg (168 lb)
- Country: United States
- Sport: Athletics/Track, Mid-distance running
- Events: Mile, 1500 meters, 800 meters
- College team: Kansas Jayhawks
- Club: Club West

Sports achievements and titles
- Olympic finals: 1964 Tokyo; 1500m, 18th (sf); 1968 Mexico City; 1500m, Silver; 1972 Munich; 1500m, 55th (h)
- Personal bests: Outdoors; 880yd/800m: 1:44.9/1:44.3 (Terre Haute 1966); 1500m: 3:33.1 (Los Angeles 1967); Mile: 3:51.1 (Bakersfield 1967); 2mi: 8:25.2 AJR (Los Angeles 1966); 5000m: 13:38.2 (Bakersfield 1972); Indoor; 880yd/800m 1:48.3i/1:47.7i (Lawrence 1967); Mile: 3:56.4i (San Diego 1971)
Medal record
Men's athletics
Representing United States
Olympic Games
Silver medal – second place	1968 Mexico City	1500m

James Ronald Ryun (born April 29, 1947) is an American former Republican politician and Olympic track and field athlete, who at his peak was widely considered the world's top middle-distance runner. He won a silver medal in the 1500 m at the 1968 Summer Olympics, and was the first high school athlete to run a mile in under four minutes. He is the last American to hold the world record in the mile run. Ryun later served in the United States House of Representatives from 1996 to 2007, representing Kansas's 2nd congressional district.

== Athletics ==
According to Ryun, he began running because

I couldn't do anything else. When you're cut from the church baseball team, the junior high basketball team, and you can't make the junior high track and field team ... I'd go to bed at night and I'd say, "Dear God, please help me do better at sports and let me find a good sport I am good at" I found myself trying out for the cross-country team and running two miles even though I'd never run that distance before. All of a sudden, I made the team, I got a letter jacket, and I started thinking there's a girlfriend behind the letter jacket. But that's how it all began.

=== Early years ===
In 1964, as a high school junior at Wichita East High School, Ryun became the first high school athlete to run a mile in under four minutes in the time of 3:59.0, when he took eighth place at the 1964 California Relays, the last under four minutes in a historic mass finish under 4:00. His time of 3:55.3, set winning the 1965 AAU Championship race ahead of Olympic gold medalist and former WR holder Peter Snell, was a high school record that stood for 36 years. Ryun ran five sub four-minute miles while in high school including the first sub four-minute mile run in a high school event, a 3:58.3, at the 1965 Kansas HS state meet. As a high school senior, he was voted the fourth-best miler in the world by Track & Field News. ESPN.com named him the best high school athlete of all time, beating out people such as Tiger Woods and LeBron James. He was Track and Field News "High School Athlete of the Year" in 1965.

=== After high school ===
In 1966, at age 19, Ryun set two world records, first in the half-mile (1:44.9), then the mile (3:51.3). He received numerous awards, including Sports Illustrated magazine's "Sportsman of the Year" award, the James E. Sullivan Award as the nation's top amateur athlete, the ABC's Wide World of Sports Athlete of the Year award, and the Track & Field News' Athlete of the Year award as the world's best track and field athlete.

In 1967, Ryun set a world record in the indoor half mile (1:48.3) and the outdoor mile from (3:51.1), a record that stood for almost eight years. That same year, he set the world record for the 1,500 meters (3:33.1). In NCAA competition, Ryun was the 1967 NCAA outdoor mile champion. He was also the NCAA indoor mile champion in 1967, 1968, and 1969.

Ryun still holds the American junior (19 and under) records at one mile (3:51.3) and two miles (8:25.1). His American junior record in the 1,500 meters of 3:36.1 was broken by Hobbs Kessler on May 29, 2021, awaiting ratification by USA Track and Field. His American junior record in the 800 meters lasted exactly 50 years. In all, he broke the American record for the mile four times, once as a high school senior (3:55.3 on June 27, 1965), twice as a college freshman (3:53.7 on June 4, 1966, and 3:51.3 on July 17, 1966), and once as a college sophomore (3:51.1 on June 23, 1967).

Official 1968 Olympic Video Highlights

Ryun participated in the 1964, 1968, and 1972 Summer Olympics. At age 17 years, 137 days in 1964, he remains the second youngest American male track athlete to ever qualify for the Olympics, behind Quincy Wilson. In 1968, he won the silver medal in the 1,500 meters in Mexico City, losing to Kip Keino from Kenya, whose remarkable race remained the Olympic 1,500-meter record for 16 years. Before the race, Ryun had thought that a time of 3:39 would be good enough to win in the high altitude of Mexico City. He ended up running faster than that with a 3:37.8, but half-way through the race Keino had moved into the first position at world record pace. Ryun continued to move up during the last two laps from eighth to second but was never closer than about 30 yards from Keino, who finished in 3:34.91, an Olympic record that would stand until 1984, despite the altitude. Years later, in 1981, he told Tex Maule in an interview for The Runner magazine, "We had thought that 3:39 would win and I ran under that. I considered it like winning a gold medal; I had done my very best and I still believe I would have won at sea level." Ryun was attacked by some writers who believed he had let his nation down. "Some even said I had let down the whole world. I didn't get any credit for running my best and no one seemed to realize that Keino had performed brilliantly." In the 1972 Munich, Germany, Games, he was tripped and fell down during a 1,500-meter qualifying heat. Although the International Olympic Committee (IOC) acknowledged that a foul had occurred, U.S. appeals to have Ryun reinstated in the competition were denied by the IOC.

British Pathe' Highlights

Ryun's 1,500-meter world record, run in the Los Angeles Memorial Coliseum during the United States vs. British Commonwealth meet in July 1967, was one of Ryun's greatest running performances. Track and Field News reported that "after 220 yards of dawdling, a record seemed out of the question." However, after 440 yards, which Ryun, in third, passed in 60.9 seconds, Kip Keino took the lead and ran the next lap in 56 seconds (the fastest second lap ever run at the time). Ryun, just behind, passed the 880-yard mark in 1:57.0. At 1,320 yards the two were side by side in 2:55.0. Ryun pulled away to finish in 3:33.1, a record that stood for seven years. With a last 440 yards of 53.9, a last 880 yards of 1:51.3, and the final 1320 yards in 2:47.4, Cordner Nelson of Track and Field News called it "the mightiest finishing drive ever seen," and said of Ryun's performance, "This was most certainly his greatest race."

Ryun's final season as an amateur in 1972 included the third-best mile of his career (at the time, the third-fastest in history - a 3:52.8 at Toronto, Canada, on July 29), a 5,000-meter career best (13:38.2 at Bakersfield, California, on May 20), and a win in the 1,500 m at the U.S. Olympic Trials. His last race at the Olympics was a 1,500 m preliminary heat on September 8, 1972. He fell after a collision with Ghana's Billy Fordjour as both trailed in the last 500 m. He got up despite being 80 m behind and completed the heat, but finished 30 m in back of the pack and did not qualify for the final. He left amateur athletics after 1972, and for the next two years, ran professionally on the International Track Association circuit.

=== World records ===
Distance	Time	Date	City
880 yards	1:44.9	June 10, 1966	Terre Haute, IN
880 yards (indoor)	1:48.3	1967	
1,500 meters	3:33.1	July 8, 1967	Los Angeles, CA
One Mile	3:51.3	July 17, 1966	Berkeley, CA
One Mile	3:51.1	June 23, 1967	Bakersfield, CA
One Mile (indoor)	3:56.4	February 19, 1971	San Diego, CA

Notes:

- Because the 880 yard race is longer than the 800 m, the 1:44.9 was converted into an estimated en route time at 800 m of 1:44.3, which equaled the existing 800 m world record, but was not ratified as a record in that event. The 880-yard mark remained the world and American records until broken by Rick Wohlhuter's 1.44.6 in 1973.
- The 3:33.1 1,500 m mark remained the world record for six years until broken by Tanzania's Filbert Bayi's 3:32.2 in 1974.
- The 3:51.1 one-mile mark remained the world record for eight years until broken by Bayi's 3:51.0 in 1975.

=== Athletic awards ===
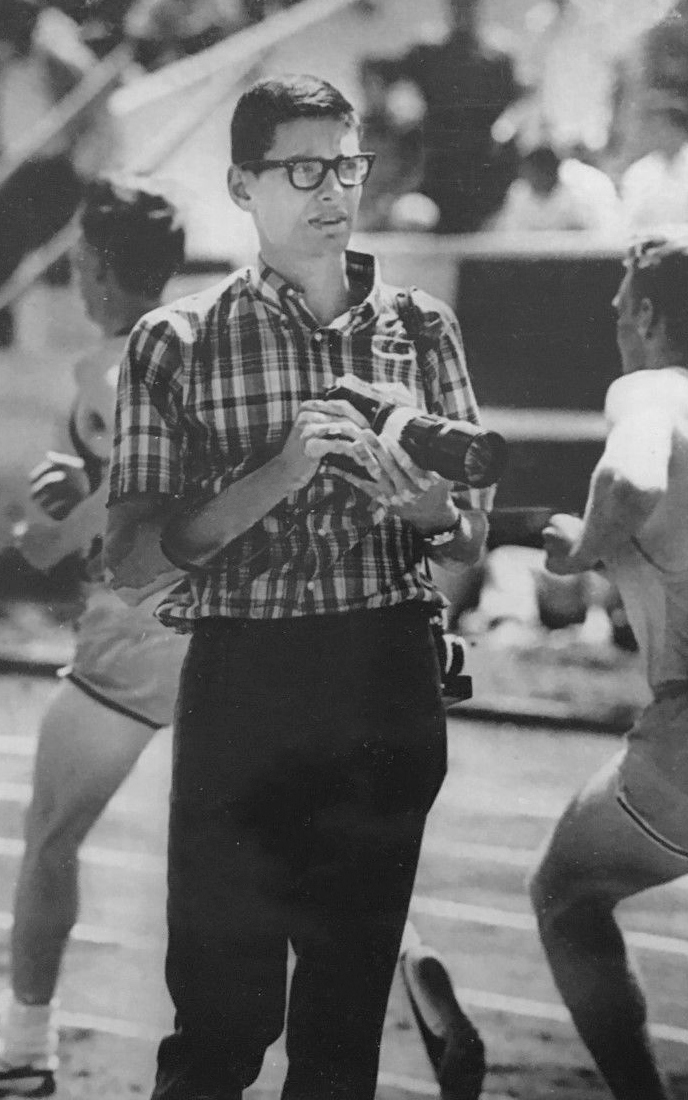
Ryun as a sports journalist in 1966

- He won the Track and Field News Athlete of the Year award for both 1966 and 1967, the first athlete to win this prestigious award two years in a row.
- He was the 1966 Sports Illustrated Sportsman of the Year; he also was on the cover of Sports Illustrated five times.
- 1966 James E. Sullivan Award, presented to the best amateur athlete in the U.S.
- 1966 ABC Wide World of Sports Athlete of the Year award
- Jim Ryun's Track and Field News world rankings:

800 m: 1966 – 1
1500 m/mile: 1965 – 4, 1966 – 1, 1967 – 1, 1968 – 2, 1969 – 7, 1971 – 6, 1972 – 9

In 1980, Ryun was inducted into the National Track and Field Hall of Fame, and in 2003 into the National Distance Running Hall of Fame.

Ryun has competed in Masters Athletics, as well.

== Personal life ==
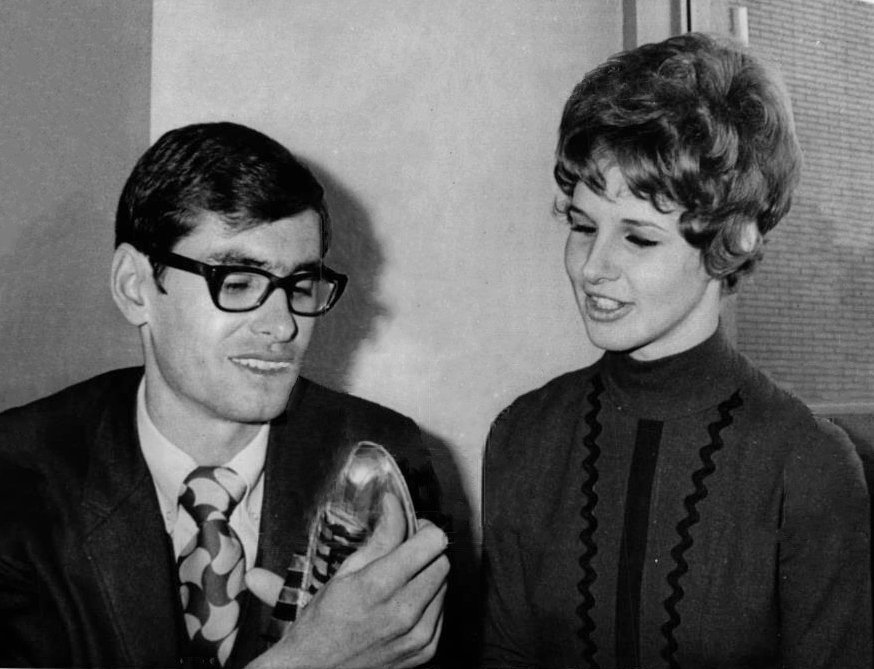
Ryun with his wife in 1971

Ryun was born in Wichita, Kansas. He now lives in Lawrence, though he was listed in the House roll as "R-Topeka". He also owns a farm in Jefferson County.

Ryun met his wife, Anne, when she asked him for an autograph after he broke the world record for the mile in Berkeley. They married in 1969 and have two sons, Ned and Drew Ryun, two daughters, Catherine and Heather, and 13 grandchildren. Along with his sons, Ned and Drew, he has co-authored three books: Heroes Among Us, The Courage to Run, and In Quest of Gold – The Jim Ryun Story.

After graduating from the University of Kansas in 1970 with a degree in photojournalism, Ryun moved to Eugene, Oregon, looking for a good training situation to continue his track career.

Though raised in the Church of Christ, Ryun and his wife are members of Grace Evangelical Presbyterian Church in Lawrence.

President Donald Trump awarded Jim Ryun the Presidential Medal of Freedom on July 24, 2020.

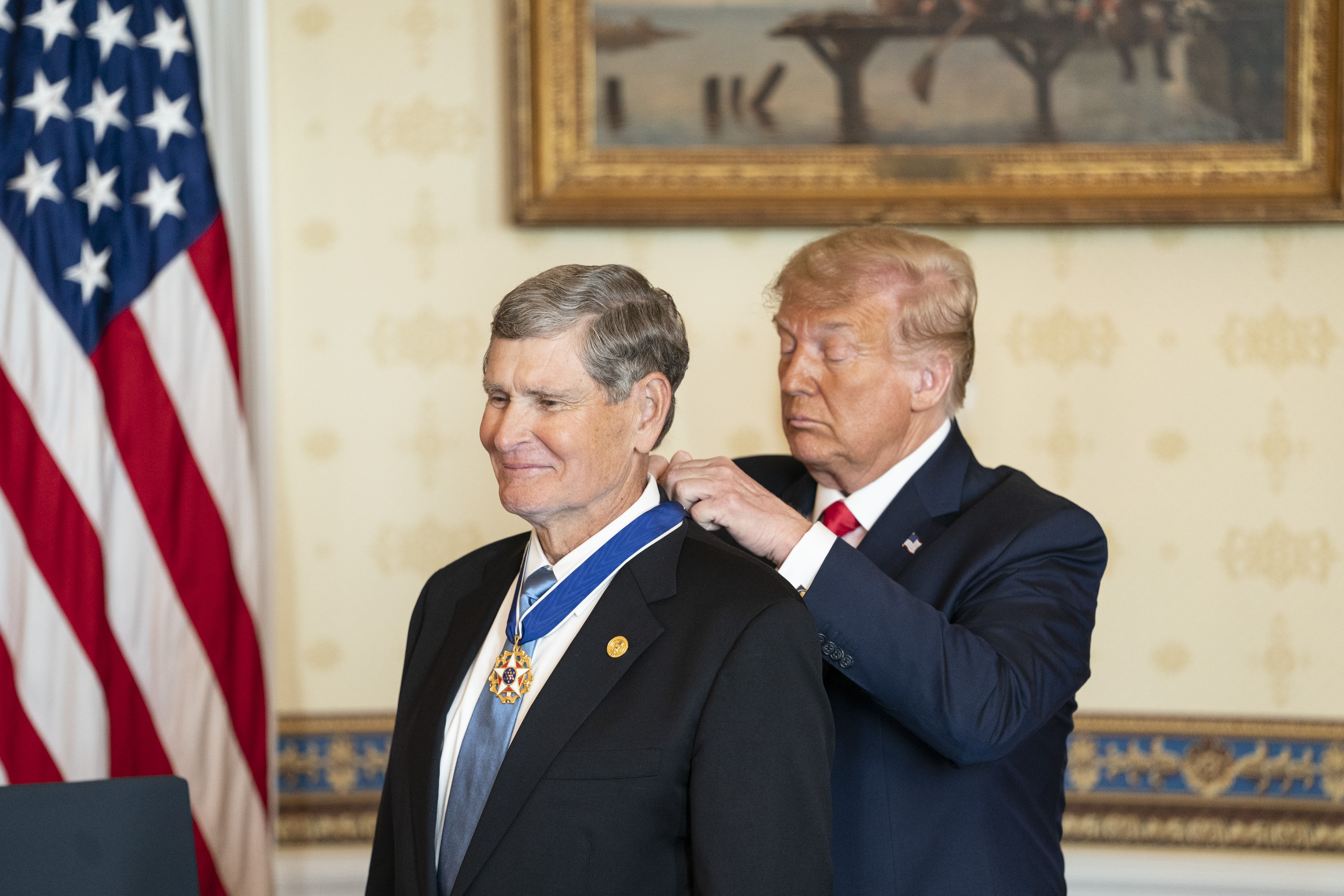
Ryun is presented with the Presidential Medal of Freedom by President Donald Trump in 2020.

== Career prior to election to Congress ==
Before being elected to the House of Representatives in 1996, Ryun had operated Jim Ryun Sports, a company that ran sports camps, and worked as a motivational speaker at meetings of corporations and Christian groups around the country. Among his projects, Ryun, who has a 50% hearing loss, helped the ReSound Hearing Aid Company develop a program called Sounds of Success, aimed at helping children with hearing loss. Since 1973, Ryun and his family have hosted running camps every summer for promising high school-aged runners.

== House of Representatives ==
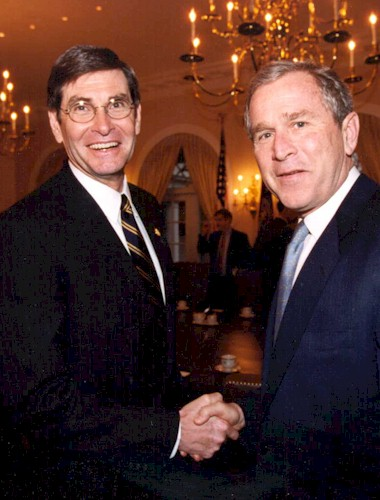
Ryun with President George W. Bush in 2004

According to Ryun, he was interested in politics, but did not have plans to run for Congress until Todd Tiahrt told him during the 1996 Summer Olympics torch relay that the Topeka-based 2nd District would have a vacancy and suggested that he run.

=== Elections ===
Ryun was first elected in 1996 to fill a seat vacated by Republican Sam Brownback. He won the three-person Republican primary with 62% of the vote, defeating former Topeka Mayor Doug Wright and Cheryl Brown Henderson, the daughter of the plaintiff in the historic Brown v. Board of Education of Topeka desegregation case. In the general campaign, Ryun was in a tight race with Democrat John Frieden, a prominent Topeka trial attorney, who outspent Ryun $750,000 to $400,000. Ryun won that contest with 52% of the vote. He did not face another contest nearly that close for almost a decade; he was re-elected three times with at least 60% of the vote.

In 2004, Democrat Nancy Boyda, a former moderate Republican, ran a campaign with spending near that of Ryun's, $1,105,838 (compared to Ryun's $1,136,464). Ryun defeated her by a margin of 55 to 42%, mainly due to the presence of George W. Bush atop the ticket.

In the 2006 election, Boyda was again the Democratic nominee, with Roger Tucker of the Reform Party of the United States of America also on the ballot. Initially expected to win, Ryun found his campaign faltering as internal polling for both his campaign and Boyda's revealed Boyda was ahead. In response, Ryun's campaign recruited both President Bush and Vice President Cheney to visit Topeka to campaign and raise campaign funds for Ryun. Ryun was defeated in an upset by Boyda, 51 to 47%.

In March 2007, Ryun confirmed that he would run for his old seat. In the Republican primary, he faced Kansas State Treasurer Lynn Jenkins, a slightly more moderate Republican who served two terms as state treasurer, a partial term in the Kansas Senate, and two years in the Kansas House. Ryun lost to Jenkins, who went on to win the seat in the general election, 51 to 46%.

=== Political actions ===
Ryun served on the Armed Services, Budget, and Financial Services committees. He tallied a strongly conservative voting record.

Ryun generally supported George W. Bush's legislative agenda, voting to support it 89% of the time, average for a House member who was from the same party as the sitting president. In 2003, he voted against the $373 billion end-of-session spending bill because he considered it to be too costly and had come to Congress to support fiscal restraint.

Ryun broke with the President over two major initiatives, No Child Left Behind and Medicare reform legislation that included a prescription-drug benefit. In voting against No Child Left Behind, Ryun said he believed states should have more control over their own education system. In opposing the Medicare bill, Ryun said the bill did not provide enough reform to keep future costs from soaring.

In 2006, the National Journal rated Ryun as the nation's most conservative member of Congress. He was a member of the Republican Study Committee, a caucus of 103 fiscally and socially conservative House Republicans.

=== Environmental record ===
In 2005, Ryun scored 0 percent on the Republicans for Environmental Protection ("REP") scorecard. Twelve issues were considered by the REP to be critical environmental issues. Jim Ryun voted with what the REP would consider pro-environment on none of the issues voted upon. These issues consisted of the drilling of oil and natural gas, Congressman Richard Pombo's bill designed to weaken the Endangered Species Act of 1973, an amendment to the Energy Policy Act of 2005, by Congresswoman Lois Capps to remove section 1502, a provision that would provide liability protection for manufacturers of the gasoline additive MTBE, and the movement to increase fuel economy standards.

Ryun also scored a 0 on the League of Conservation Voters's scorecard. Many of REP's critical issues were present on the scorecard.

In 2006, Ryun improved his REP scorecard when he voted pro-environment on two of seven critical issues. This earned him a 17% rating. He voted to help reduce the impact the Army Corps of Engineers had on the environment. The issues in which he voted against the REP were ones involving oil drilling in the Arctic National Wildlife Refuge, renewable resource programs, and the movement to end debate and accept the Gulf of Mexico Energy Security Act.

== Controversies ==
=== Townhouse purchase in 2000 ===
On December 15, 2000, Ryun bought a townhouse in the District of Columbia from U.S. Family Network for $410,000. The townhouse had been purchased about two years earlier, for $429,000, to house Ed Buckham's consulting firm Alexander Strategy Group and Tom DeLay's ARMPAC.

After questions were raised as to the purchase of Ryun's townhouse, his office released official documents showing that Ryun paid $80,000 more than the tax assessed value of the house, that he put another $50,000 into house repairs, and that another home on the same block was sold for $409,000 on the same day he bought his home. According to property records, the other home does not have a garage or a back patio and is on a plot about half the size of Ryun's. It was assessed in 2006 as worth $528,000, compared to $764,000 for Ryun's home. In contrast, homes across the street from Ryun's were sold for over $900,000.

=== Connection to Mark Foley ===
After Rep. Mark Foley resigned in October 2006, following revelations he had sent sexually explicit emails to teenaged congressional pages, Ryun contended that he barely knew Foley, had never spent time with him, and was unaware that they lived directly across the street from each other in Washington, DC. "I know that [we were neighbors] only because somebody has mentioned that, too, already," he told reporters at the time. Later, though, Ryun and Foley were found to have hosted a joint fundraiser on their street on May 18, 2006, called the "D Street Block Party". An invitation to the fundraiser included side-by-side pictures of Ryun and Foley. Ryun's campaign manager later said that Ryun had always known he was Foley's neighbor.

Awards and achievements
Preceded by Gerry Lindgren	Track & Field News High School Boys Athlete of the Year; 1965	Succeeded by Tim Danielson
Preceded by Ron Clarke	Track & Field News Athlete of the Year; 1966–1967	Succeeded by Bob Beamon
Records
New title	Men's World Junior Record Holder, 800 meters June 10, 1966 – August 13, 1997	Succeeded by Japheth Kimutai
Preceded by Michel Jazy	Men's Mile World Record Holder; July 17, 1966 – May 17, 1975	Succeeded by Filbert Bayi
Preceded by Herb Elliott	1500m World Record Holder; July 8, 1967 – February 2, 1974	Succeeded by Filbert Bayi
U.S. House of Representatives
Preceded by Sam Brownback	Member of the U.S. House of Representatives from Kansas's 2nd congressional district 1996–2007	Succeeded by Nancy Boyda
U.S. order of precedence (ceremonial)
Preceded by Denny Smith as Former U.S. Representative	Order of precedence of the United States as Former U.S. Representative	Succeeded by Lynn Jenkins as Former U.S. Representative
