= Safety car =

Car which limits the speed of competing cars on a racetrack

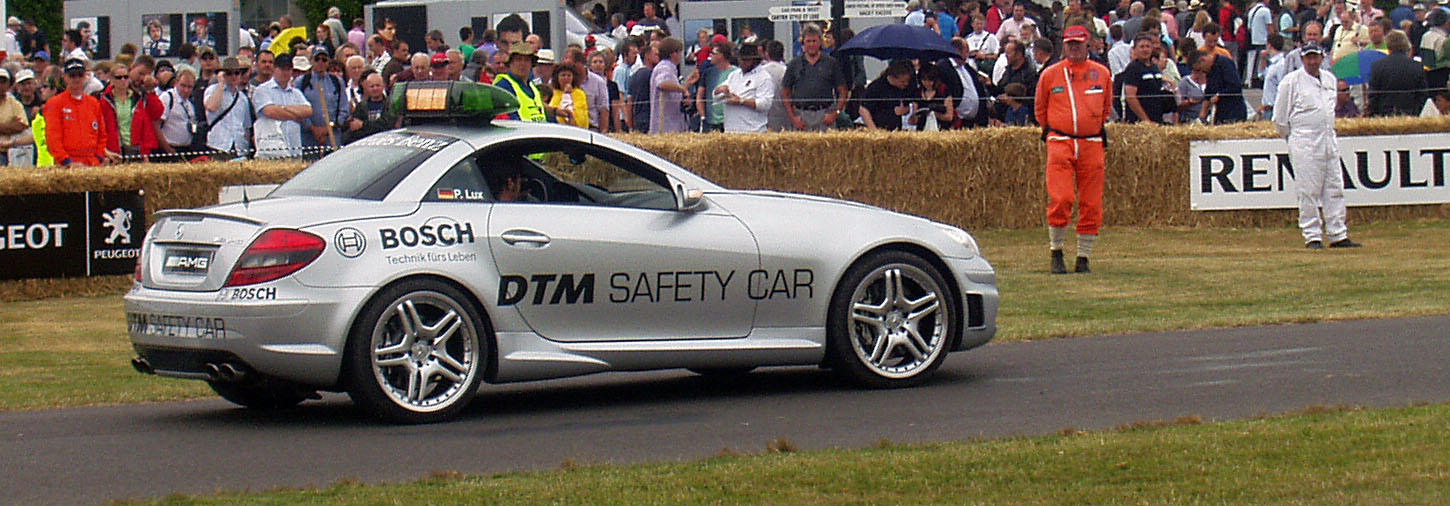
Mercedes-Benz SLK safety car of the Deutsche Tourenwagen Masters at the Goodwood Festival of Speed

In motorsport, a safety car, or a pace car, is a car that limits the speed of competing cars or motorcycles on a racetrack in the case of a caution period, such as an obstruction on the track or bad weather. The safety car aims to enable the clearance of any obstruction under safer conditions, especially for marshals or awaiting more favourable track conditions weather-wise. By following the safety car, the competitors' tyres remain as close as possible to operating temperature while their engines do not overheat. A safety car is also preferred over stopping the race (red flag) and restarting, as the latter takes longer.

During a caution period, the safety car (which is typically an appropriately modified high-performance production car) enters the race track ahead of the leader. Depending on the regulations in effect, competitors are not normally allowed to pass the safety car or other competitors during a caution period, and the safety car leads the field at a predetermined safe speed, which may vary by series and circuit. At the end of the caution period, the safety car leaves the track, and the competitors resume normal racing. The first reliance on this safety measure occurred with the deployment of a pace car during the inaugural Indianapolis 500 in 1911.

== Effect ==
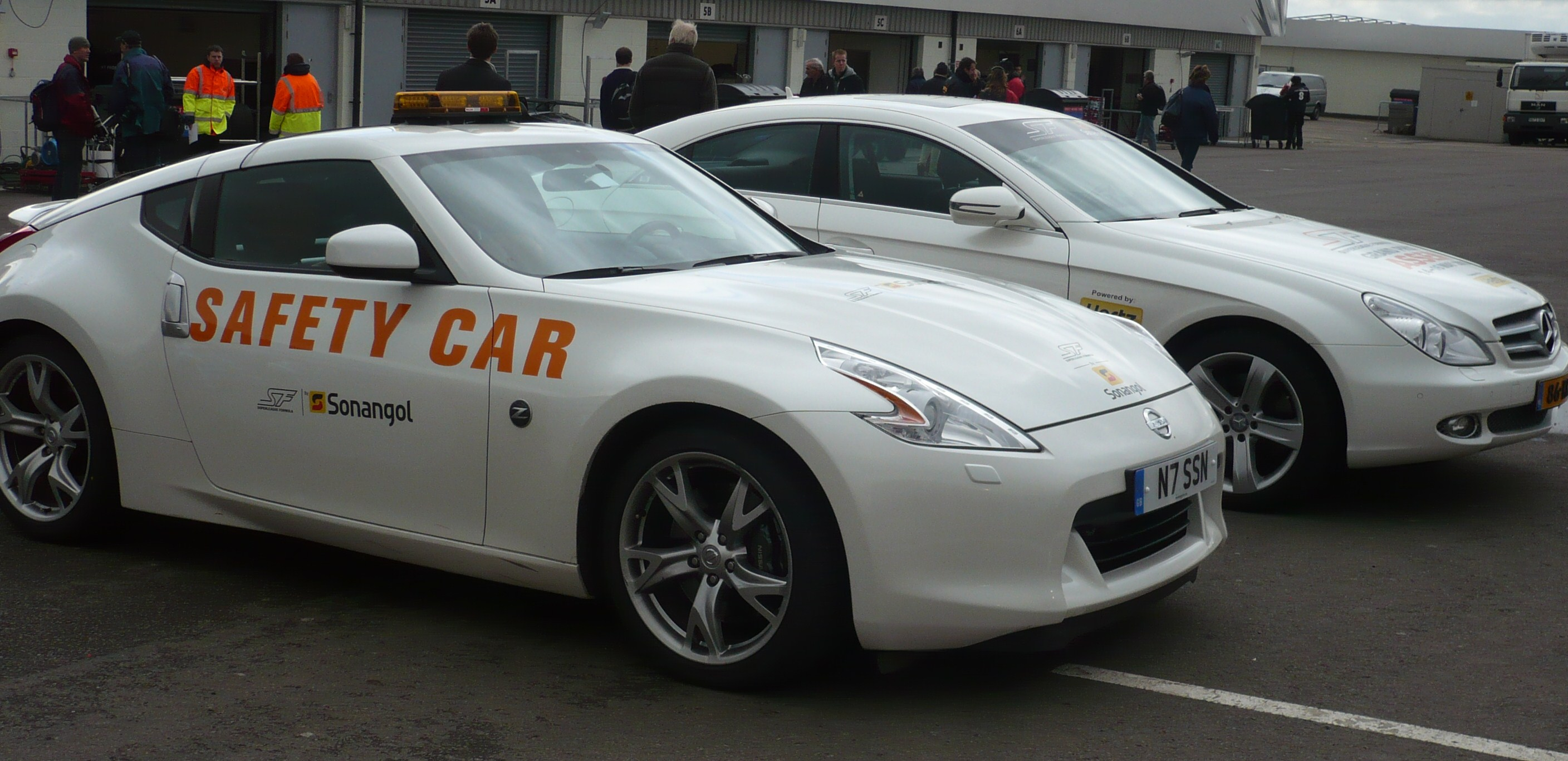
Two Superleague Formula safety cars in the paddock at Silverstone Circuit

The use of a safety car has the effect of bunching competitors together, such as to eliminate any time and distance advantage that a leading driver may have had over the remaining field of competitors. This effect can make racing more competitive upon full race resumption. On the other hand, it penalizes leading drivers by eliminating any advantage they may have gained prior to the caution period.

Subject to the racing regulations in force, it is not uncommon for drivers to be allowed to make pitstops during safety car periods. This situation may provide a strategic advantage since any scheduled refueling, tire change or maintenance may be carried out while other competitors are lapping at lower speed, and the drivers who pit then simply rejoin a queue of cars all running together. During normal racing conditions, such interventions would typically involve losing significant terrain over those drivers that remain on-track.

Another notable effect of safety car periods is that racing cars consume less fuel until full race resumption, which can allow competitors to run longer distances on a tank of fuel than would otherwise have been possible and/or reduce the number of pitstops required for the duration of the race.

== Formula One ==
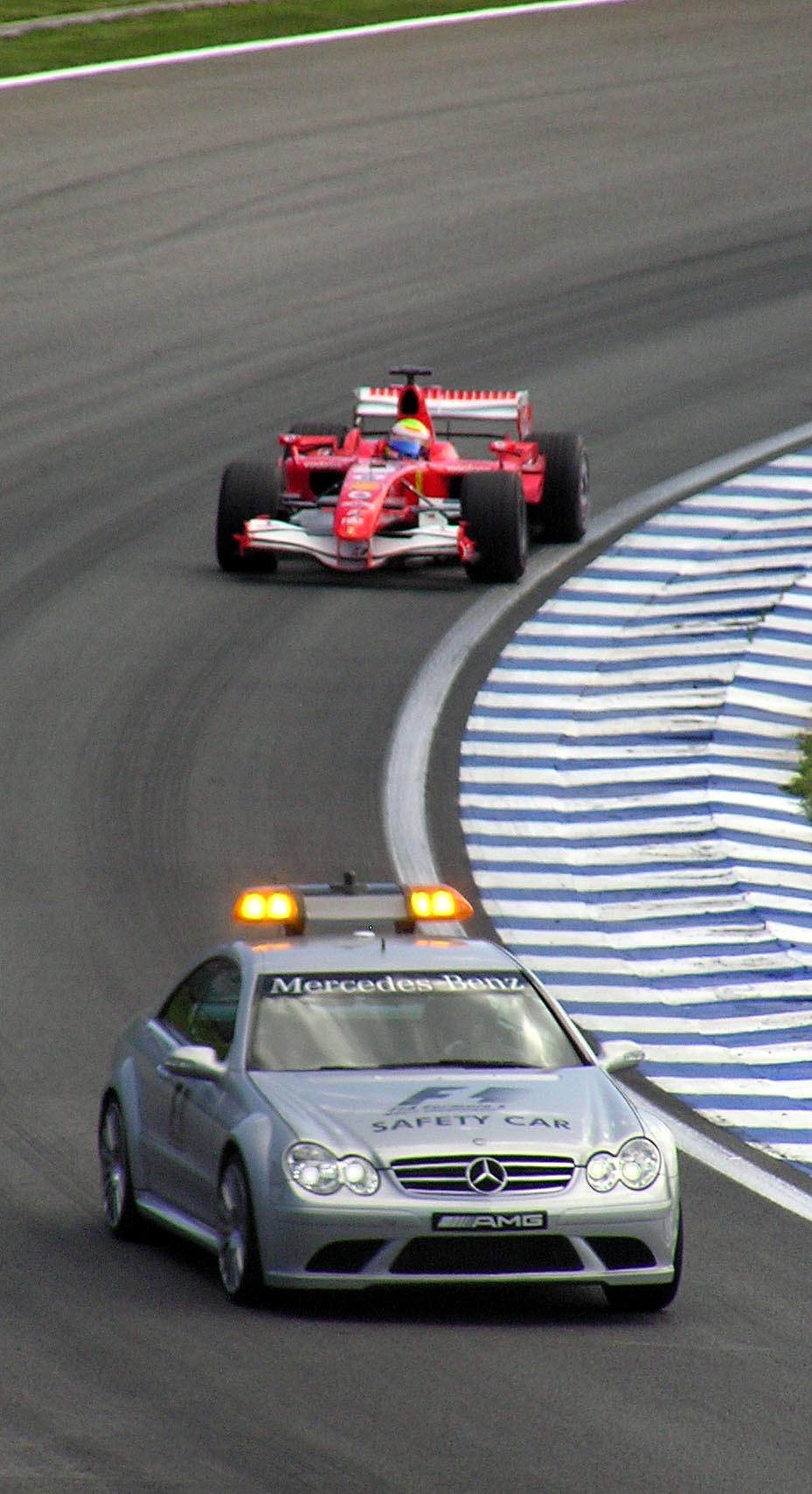
Felipe Massa driving behind a Mercedes-Benz CLK 63 AMG F1 Safety Car at the 2006 Brazilian Grand Prix. When required, the F1 safety car will lead the field around the circuit at reduced speed with the race leader immediately following.

=== Procedure ===
In Formula One, if an accident or inclement weather (typically, heavy rain) prevents normal racing from continuing safely, the Race Director will call for a "safety car" period, which would see marshals wave yellow flags and hold "SC" boards, pending the car in question entering the track. From 2007, all Formula One cars must have LEDs and/or displays fitted to the steering wheel or cockpit, which inform the driver which flags are being waved. A yellow LED is illuminated when the safety car is deployed.

The safety car is driven by a professional driver (since 2000, by Bernd Mayländer), accompanied by a co-driver to assist with operations and communications. The safety car has both orange and green lights mounted on its roof in the form of a light bar. The green lights are used to signal that it is possible to overtake the safety car; this is only done until the race leader is immediately behind the safety car and at the head of the queue of race cars following.

Until 2014 the safety car was required to wait until all backmarkers have caught back up to the queue. When the safety car is ready to leave the circuit, it will turn off its orange lights to indicate that it will enter the pit lane at the end of the lap. Drivers must continue in formation until they cross the first safety car line, where circuit green lights and flags will indicate they are free to race again.

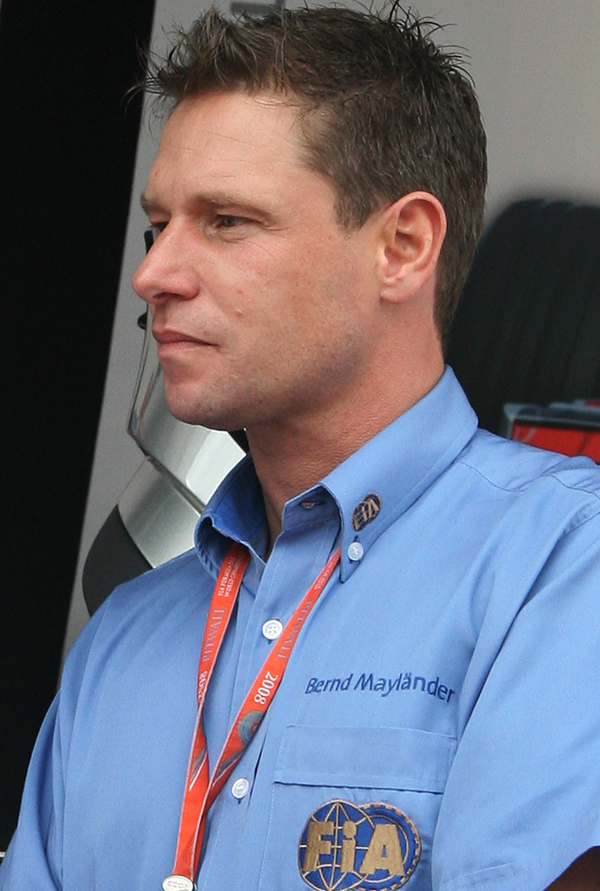
Bernd Mayländer, the F1 safety car driver since 2000

The safety car must maintain a reasonable speed to ensure that the competitors' tyres are as close as possible to operating temperature and their engines do not overheat.

For incidents during the first three laps, the safety car also has an advantage over the traditional red flag; with a red flag, it would take a minimum of fifteen minutes to restart the race, and the two-hour limit would not start until the cars were ready for a second formation lap. With regards to the time limit, the race is being scored and the time is also counting while the safety car is on the track, and the race resumes.

=== History ===
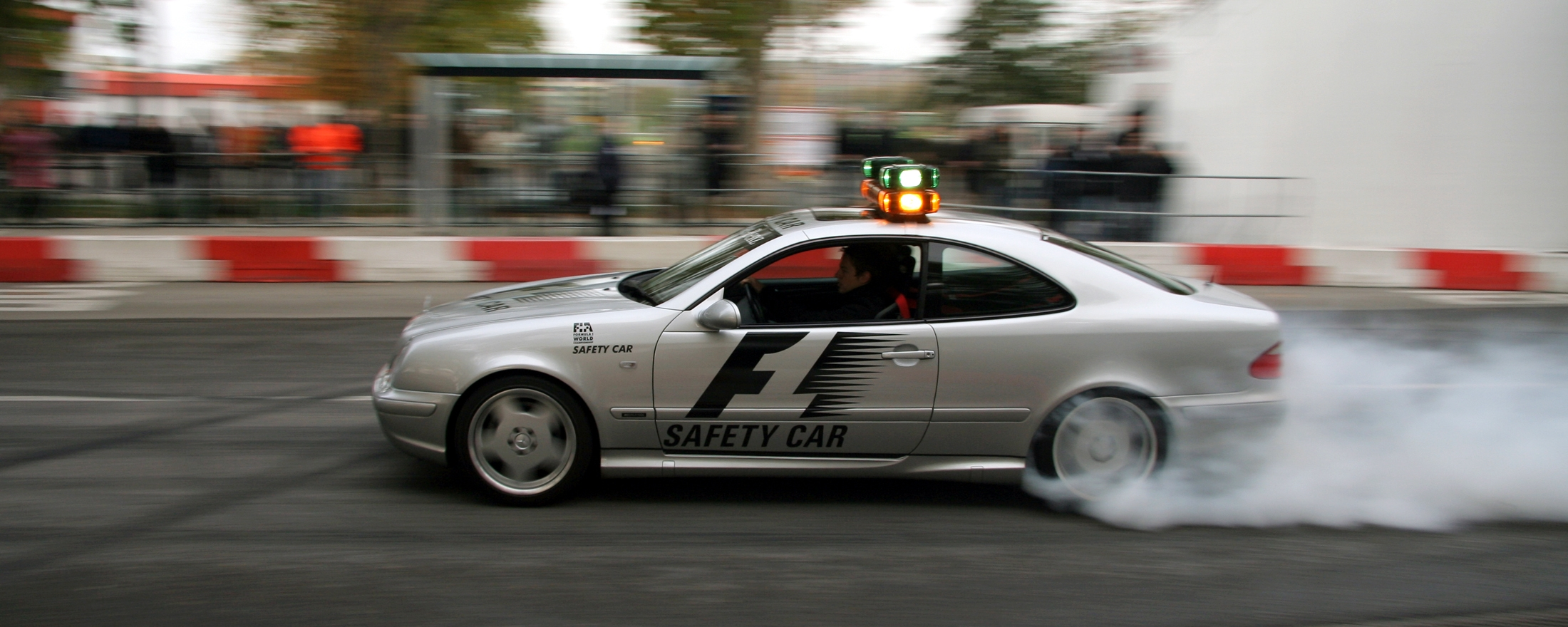
1997 Mercedes-Benz CLK 55 AMG safety car (C208)

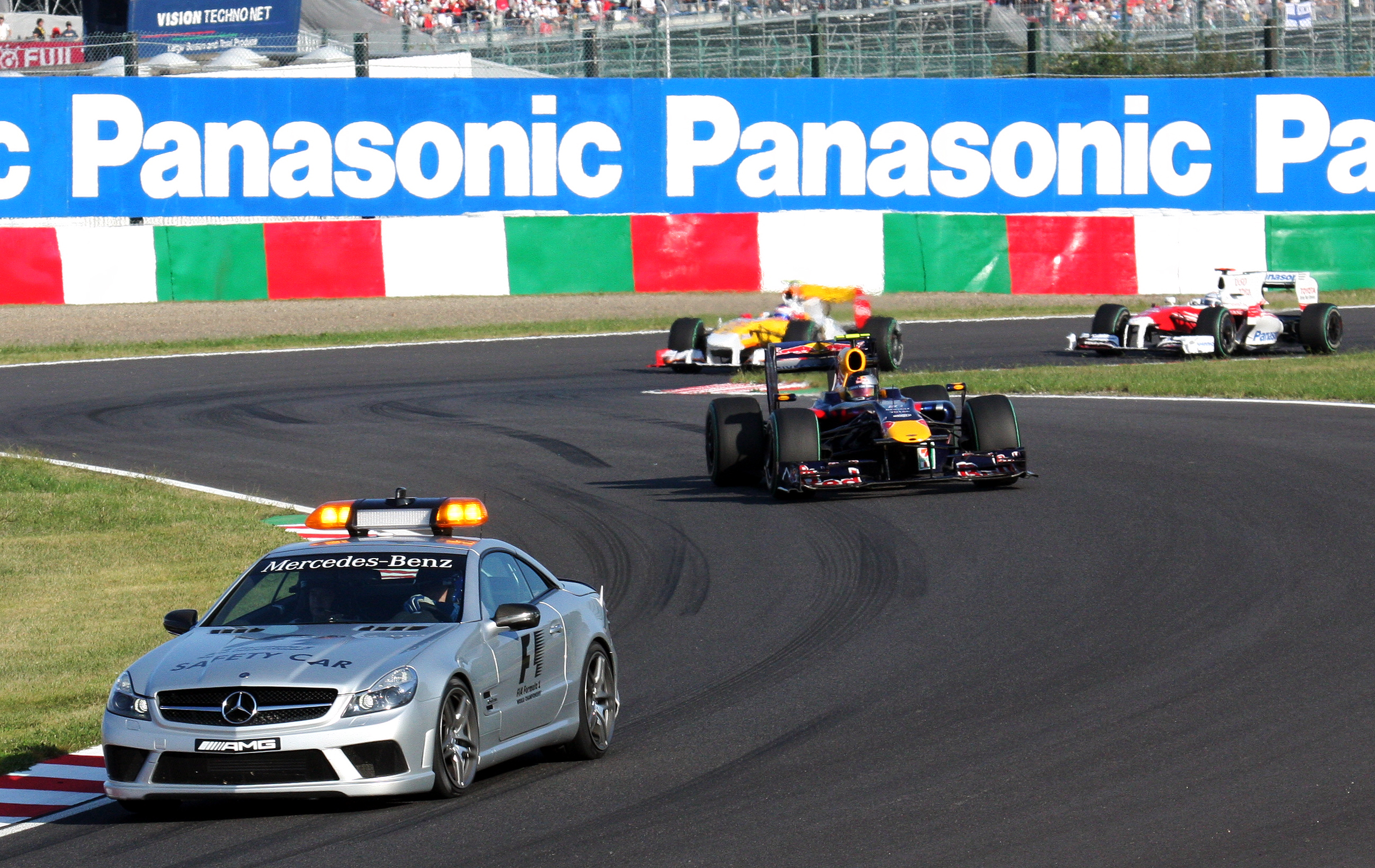
Mercedes-Benz SL 63 AMG safety car during the 2009 Japanese Grand Prix

The first use of a safety car in Formula One is reported to have taken place at the 1973 Canadian Grand Prix, where a yellow Porsche 914 was called for duty following various incidents under treacherous weather conditions. Controversially, on that occasion, it took several hours after the race to figure out the winner and final results since the safety car driver had placed his car in front of the wrong competitor thus causing part of the field to be one lap down incorrectly.

Formula One officially introduced safety cars in 1993, after trials were conducted at both the French and British Grands Prix during the preceding 1992 season. From 1993 through 1995, this saw cars of different brands being used as the safety car throughout the season and depending on the track visited; for example, they included the exotic Lamborghini Countach for the Monaco Grand Prix in the 1980s, or the Lamborghini Diablo for the 1995 Canadian Grand Prix to the more mundane Fiat Tempra used at the rain-affected 1993 Brazilian Grand Prix, and the high performance version of the Opel Vectra used at the 1994 San Marino Grand Prix. In particular, the Opel Vectra was criticized as it had a low top speed, which was insufficient to keep the competitors' tyre temperatures high, and the Vectra's brakes faded on the first lap causing its driver to go slowly. Since 1996, in order to standardize the safety car type/performance and also as part of promotional arrangements, the main supplier of safety cars has been Mercedes-Benz, with Aston Martin sharing the duties with them from 2021 to 2025.

From 2007, new procedures were applied for the first time during the Bahrain Grand Prix. The pit lane was closed immediately upon the deployment of the safety car. No car could enter the pits until all cars on the track had formed up in a line behind the safety car, they passed the pit entrance, and the message "pit lane open" was given. A ten-second stop/go penalty (which must be taken when the race is resumed) was imposed on any driver who entered the pit lane before the pit lane open message is given. However, any car which was in the pit entry or pit lane when the safety car was deployed would not incur a penalty. This was exploited during the 2008 Singapore Grand Prix when Nelson Piquet, Jr. wrecked his Renault shortly after teammate Fernando Alonso had exited the pits in what was later discovered to be an intentional crash designed to trigger a safety car and subsequent closure of the pit lane.

From 2009, however, this procedure has been dropped, and replaced by software that calculates where a car is on the track and a minimum lap time it should take the car to get to the pits. Cars that enter the pits before this time limit has expired are penalised.

When the safety car and the drivers behind it are on the start/finish straight, there is a red light at the exit of the pit lane. Drivers who go past the red light are penalized. In the past, the penalty was disqualification; this has happened to several drivers during the years, such as Juan Pablo Montoya at the 2005 Canadian Grand Prix and Giancarlo Fisichella and Felipe Massa in the 2007 Canadian Grand Prix. At the same race a year later, Lewis Hamilton failed to notice the red light and slammed into the back of the car of Kimi Räikkönen, who was waiting at the end of the pit lane alongside Robert Kubica. However, disqualification is no longer the standard penalty; as of 2025, the Formula One penalty guidelines recommend a 10-second stop/go penalty for running the red light.

From 2010, once cars were lined up behind the safety car, lapped cars were no longer allowed to unlap themselves before the race was restarted. This rule was abandoned from the 2012 season onwards, with cars now allowed to unlap themselves before the race resumes. However, since 2015, the safety car does not need to wait for the backmarkers to catch up with the leading pack before returning to the pits.

The 2021 Belgian Grand Prix became the shortest race in Formula One World Championship history and the first (and so far only) World Championship Grand Prix in history to be run entirely behind the safety car. Two full laps were completed behind the safety car before the race was red flagged on lap 3. Results were taken from the end of lap 1, with Max Verstappen declared the winner of the event and half points awarded to the top 10 classified drivers.

In response to the safety car restart at the 2021 Abu Dhabi Grand Prix, before which some lapped cars were directed to overtake the safety car but others were not, the FIA reworked the safety car restart procedure: instead of waiting for the last lapped car to unlap itself, the safety car will now be withdrawn one lap after the instruction to unlap is received.

Between 2021 and 2025, F1 featured two official safety cars, both the Aston Martin Vantage and the Mercedes-AMG GT R that was already used in previous seasons. Since 2022, Mercedes provides a Black Series variant of the GT. Since 2026, Aston Martin stopped providing safety cars, leaving Mercedes as sole supplier.

==== Chronology of Formula One safety cars ====
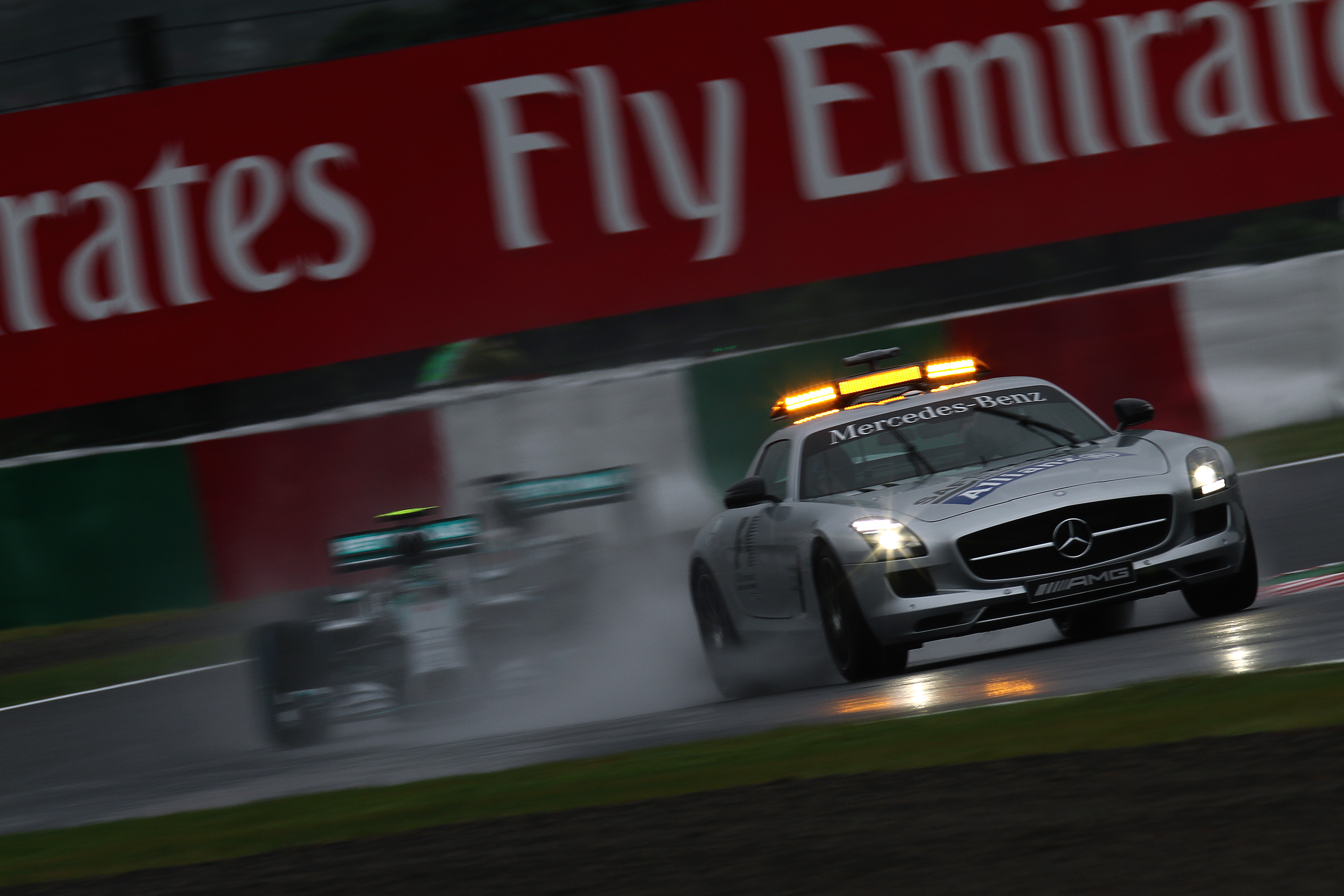
Mercedes-Benz SLS AMG safety car during the 2014 Japanese Grand Prix

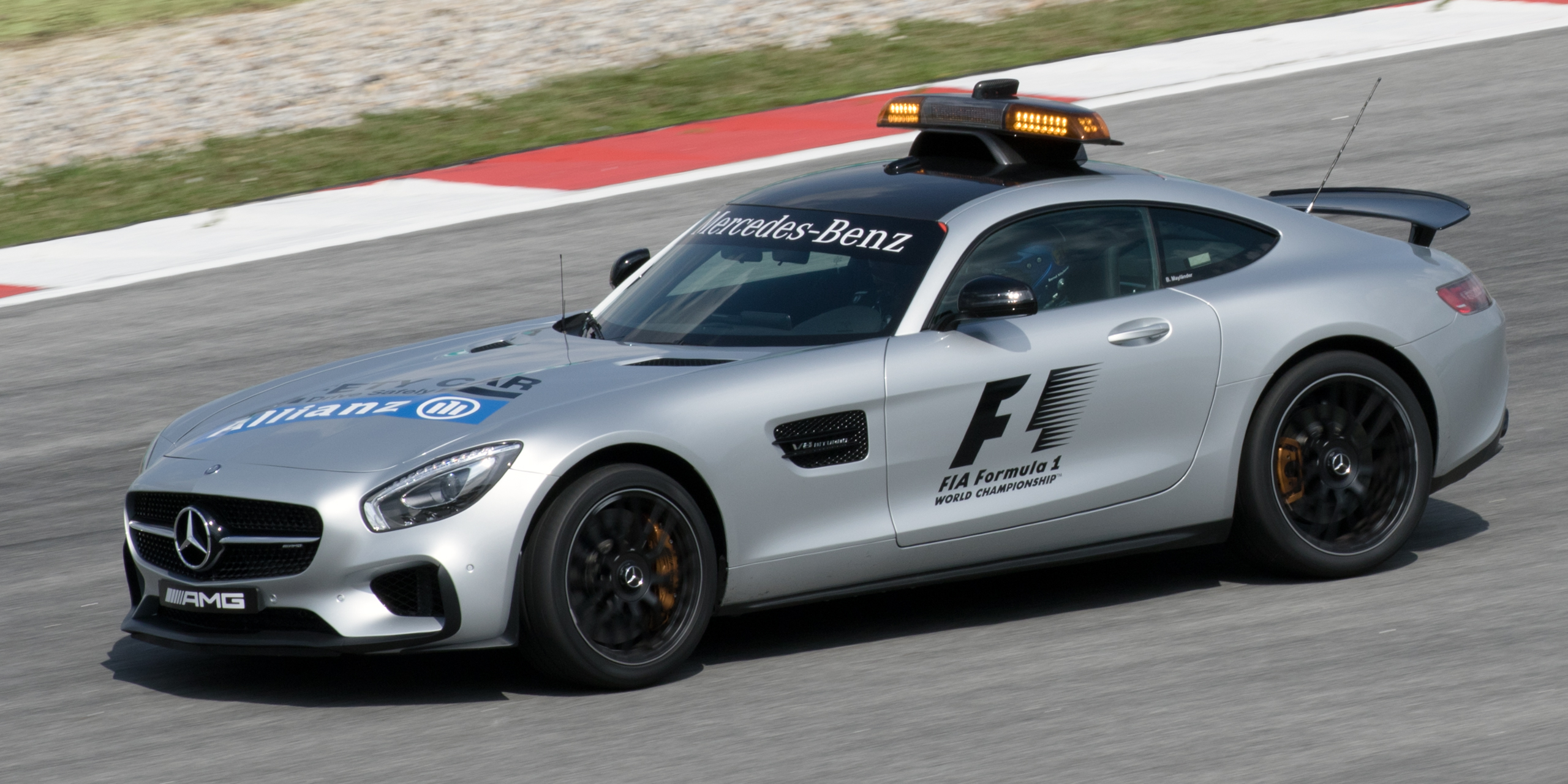
Mercedes-Benz AMG GT S safety car during the 2015 Malaysian Grand Prix

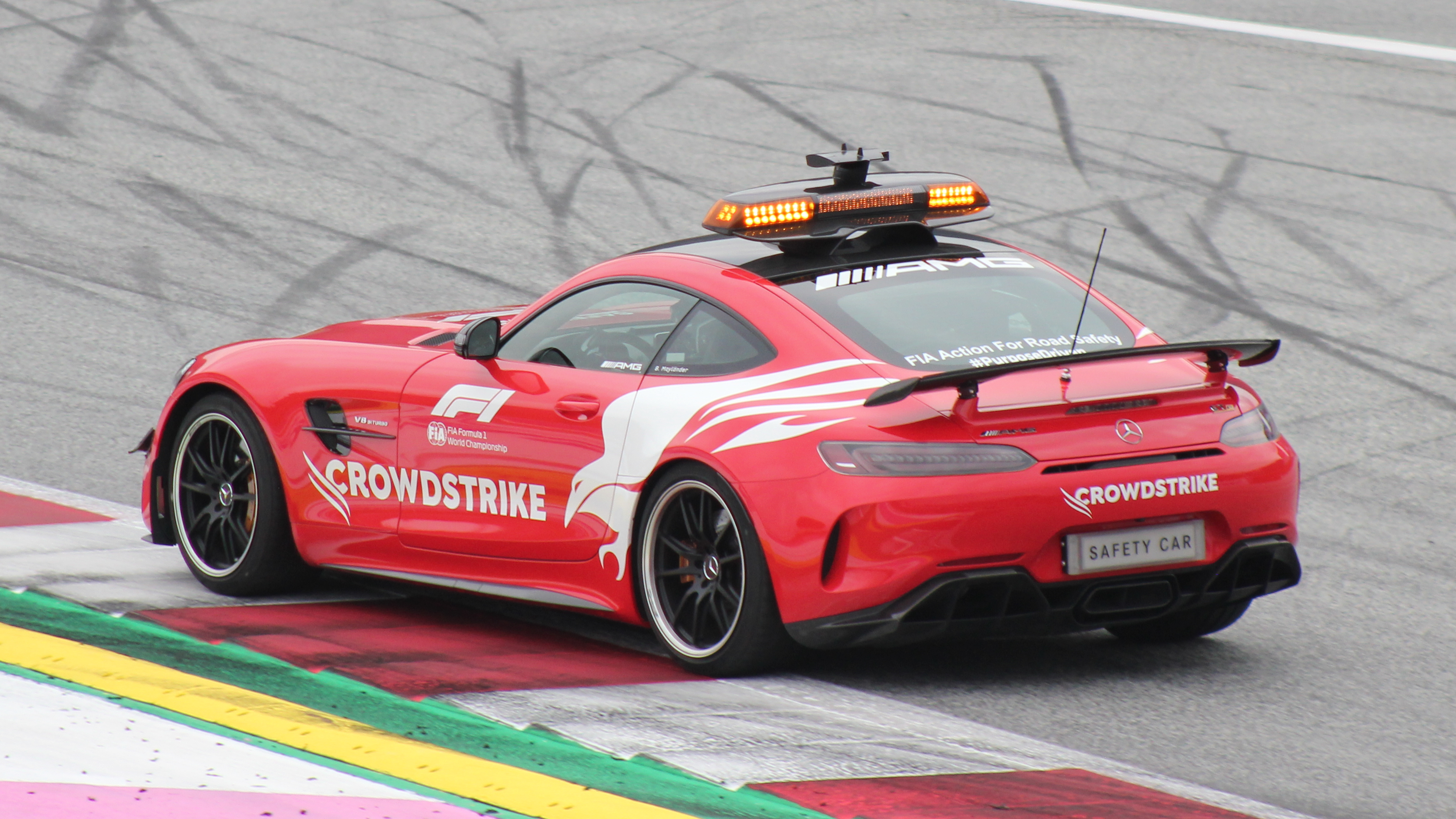
Mercedes-Benz AMG GT R safety car during the 2021 Austrian Grand Prix

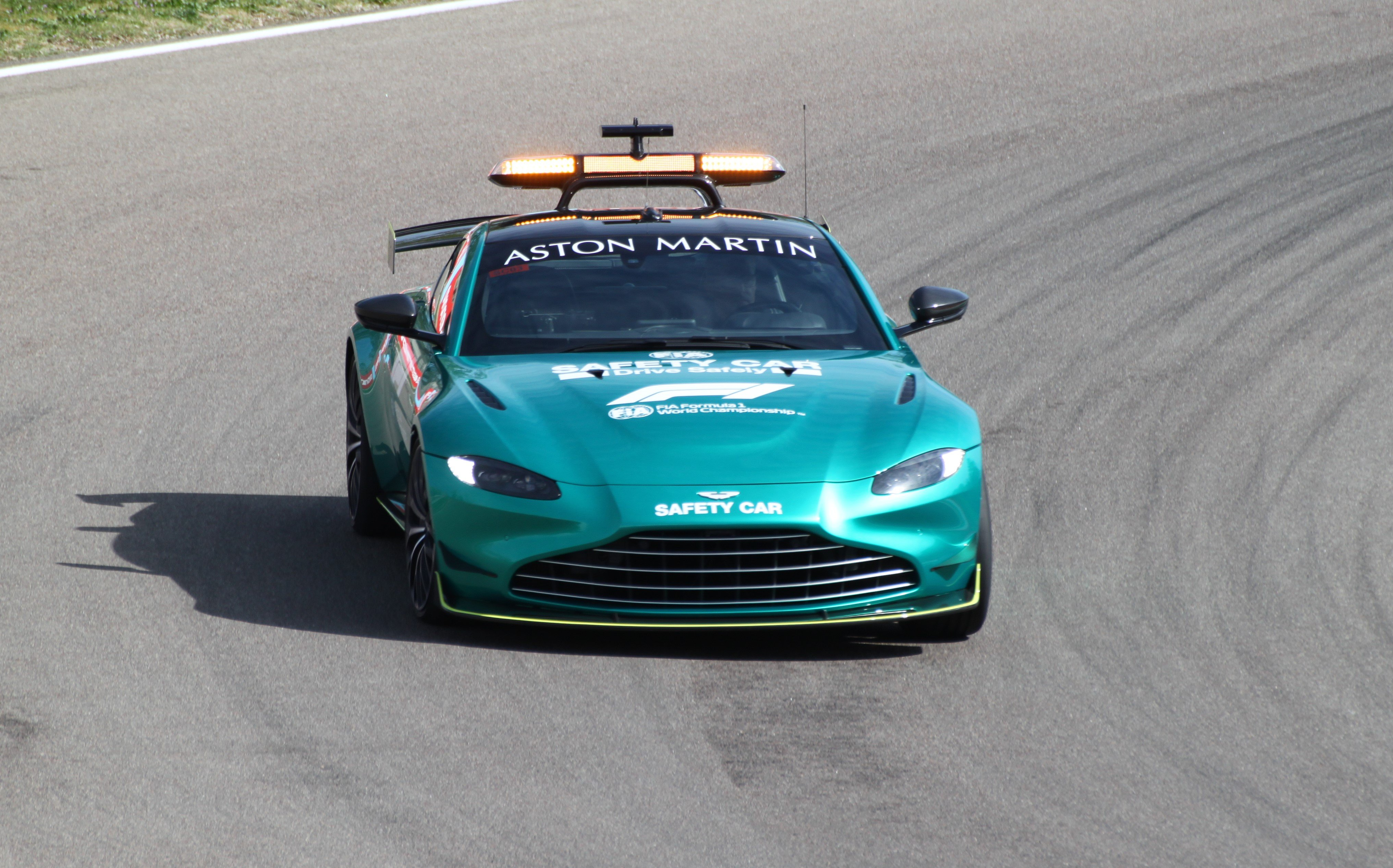
Aston Martin Vantage safety car

Aston Martin Vantage (2024 facelift) safety car

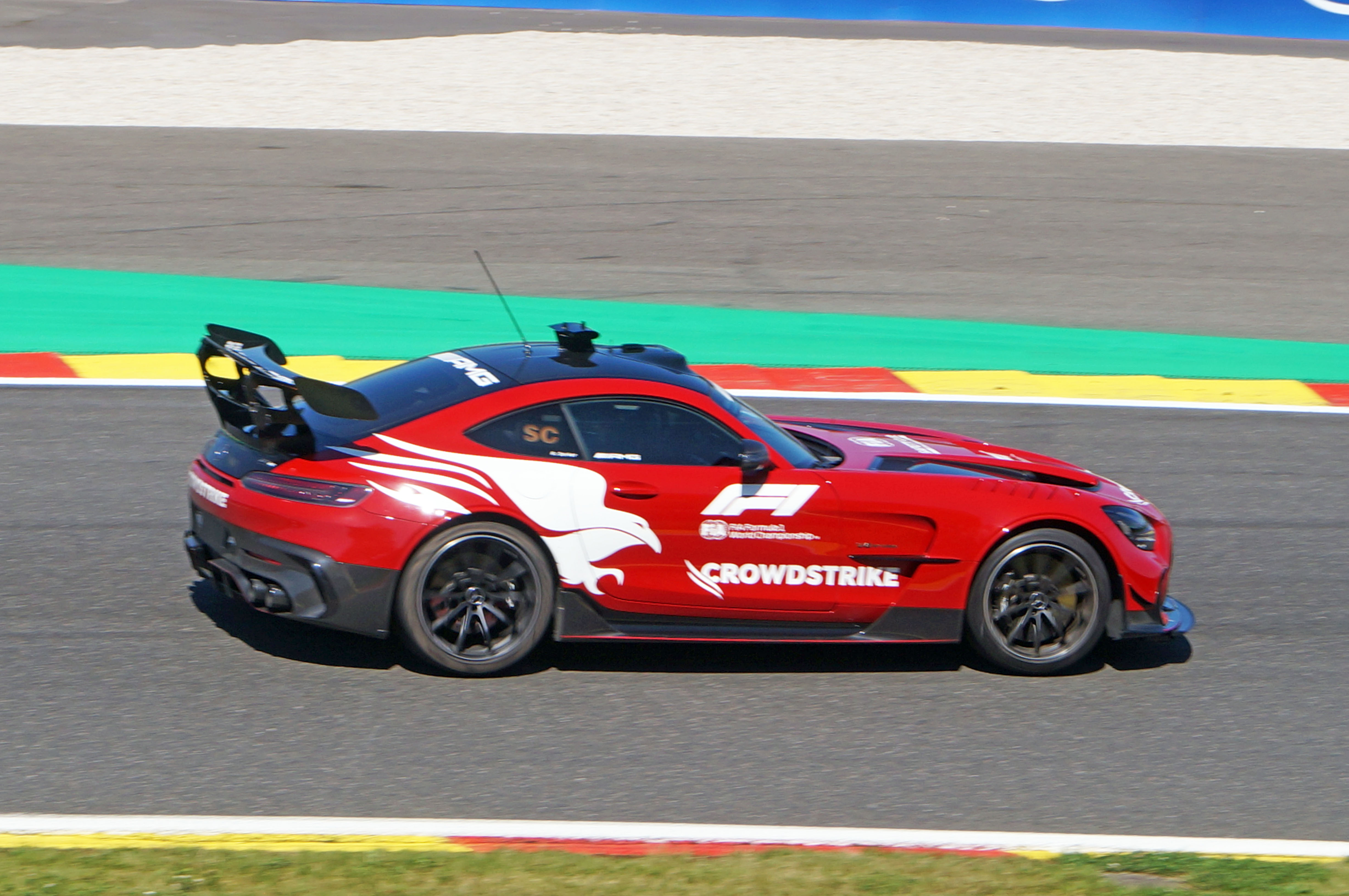
Mercedes-AMG GT Black Series safety car during the 2024 Belgian Grand Prix weekend

- Porsche 914 – 1973 Canadian Grand Prix
- Porsche 911 – 1976 Monaco Grand Prix
- Lamborghini Countach – 1981, 1982, and 1983 Monaco Grand Prix
- Fiat Tempra 16V – 1993 Brazilian Grand Prix
- Ford Escort RS Cosworth – 1993 British Grand Prix
- Opel Vectra - 1994 San Marino Grand Prix
- Honda Prelude – 1994 Japanese Grand Prix
- Lamborghini Diablo – 1995 Canadian Grand Prix
- Porsche 911 GT2 – 1995 Belgian Grand Prix
- Renault Clio – 1996 Argentine Grand Prix
- Mercedes-Benz C 36 AMG – 1996 to 1997
- Mercedes-Benz CLK 55 AMG – 1997 to 1998
- Mercedes-Benz CL 55 AMG – 1999 to 2000
- Mercedes-Benz SL 55 AMG – 2001 to 2002
- Mercedes-Benz CLK 55 AMG – 2003
- Mercedes-Benz SLK 55 AMG – 2004 to 2005
- Mercedes-Benz CLK 63 AMG – 2006 to 2007
- Mercedes-Benz SL 63 AMG – 2008 to 2009
- Mercedes-Benz SLS AMG – 2010 to 2012
- Mercedes-Benz SLS AMG GT– 2012 to 2014
- Mercedes-AMG GT S – 2015 to 2017
- Mercedes-AMG GT R – 2018 to 2021
- Aston Martin Vantage – 2021 to 2023
- Mercedes-AMG GT Black Series – 2022 to 2026
- Aston Martin Vantage (2024 facelift) – 2024 to mid 2025
- Aston Martin Vantage S – mid 2025
- Mercedes-AMG GT 63 PRO 4MATIC+– 2026 to current.
  Baku 2026 F1 Pace cars with Medical cars in background

=== Virtual safety car (VSC) ===
Following an accident at the 2014 Japanese Grand Prix, which saw driver Jules Bianchi suffer a serious head injury which led to his death, the FIA established an "accident panel" to investigate the dynamics of the accident and ways to minimize the risk of a crash during similar circumstances that do not warrant the deployment of a safety car and cannot be simply managed with yellow flags.

The accident panel recommended the implementation of a "virtual safety car", based on the "slow zone" system used in Le Mans racing. Compared to the former, the safety car does not actually appear on the track. On top of not being allowed to overtake under yellow flag conditions in the affected sector, a "VSC" icon would appear trackside and on the drivers' steering displays, obliging drivers to not exceed the posted speed limit, thus resulting in a 35% speed reduction. All drivers are informed of their delta time (the difference between their speed and the current speed limit) on their dashboard display, and must keep their delta times positive, meaning they must be slower than the reference time. The system was similar to the Electro-PACER lights used in the Indianapolis 500 races from 1972 until 1978, except that engine control units (ECU) were involved and could enforce speed limits under the current system.

The VSC was tested over the course of the final three races of the 2014 season, during parts of free practice sessions. The system was evolved taking into account drivers' feedback and was officially introduced for the 2015 season following ratification by the World Motor Sport Council (WMSC). The VSC was officially used for the first time, and for a brief period prior to the deployment of the actual safety car, at the 2015 Monaco Grand Prix, following a 30G crash involving Max Verstappen. The system saw its first extended deployment at the 2015 British Grand Prix after Carlos Sainz Jr.'s power unit failed at Club Corner of the Silverstone Circuit.

== Formula E ==
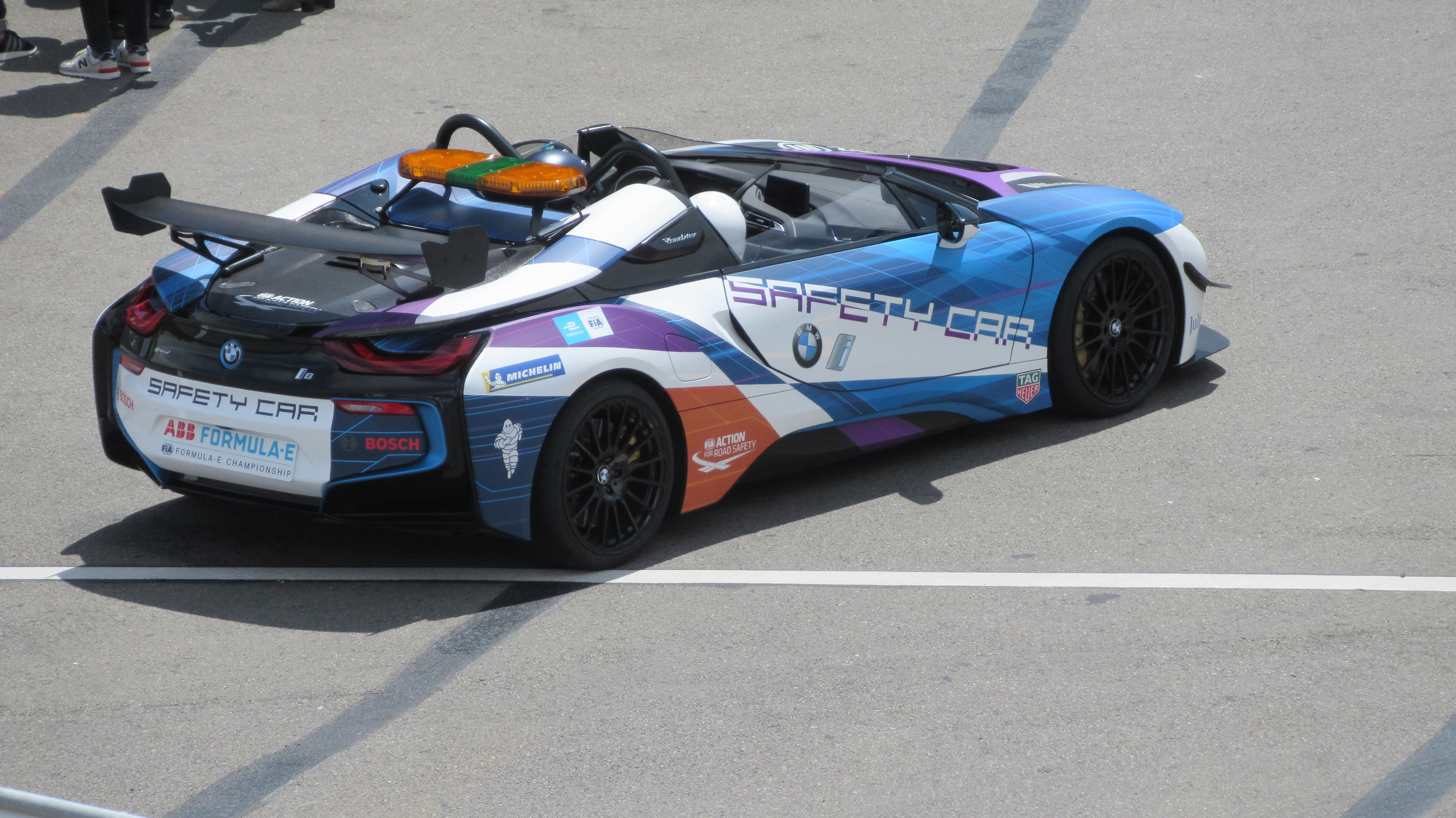
The BMW i8 plug-in hybrid was the safety car of Formula E from the first season to the first two races of the seventh season. It was replaced by the Mini Electric.

The Full Course Yellow condition is the Formula E version of the Virtual Safety Car. In this condition, all marshal posts will wave yellow flags, accompanied by a sign that says "FCY" with a yellow background. This condition is often decided by the Race Director whether it is appropriate to implement it or not. The fans (if they are watching the race on TV) and drivers can hear the Race Director declare the FCY on the radio. Once the FCY is implemented, all drivers must activate the FCY limiter, which, similar to the pit speed limiter, keeps the car under FCY speeds despite the throttle being flat to the floor. Overtaking is not allowed under FCY conditions, but if a driver does overtake another driver, like when Jean-Éric Vergne overtook António Félix da Costa at the 2019 Rome ePrix, the driver who overtook the other driver can be penalised. For season 6 of Formula E, when there is an FCY period, everyone is no longer allowed to activate Attack Mode. For every minute spent under FCY conditions, 1kWh of energy kept in reserve by the drivers will be subtracted, giving more energy saving tactics to the drivers and teams alike. Like Formula One, Formula E also has a safety car condition. From 2014 to 2021, a BMW i8 plug-in hybrid was used. Starting with the 2021 Rome ePrix, a Mini Electric was used, and a Porsche Taycan has been used since 2022. Formula E also includes a rule from 2022 which states that if the safety car is used in a race, extra time will be added in order to compensate for the missed racing time due to the safety car.

== IndyCar Series ==
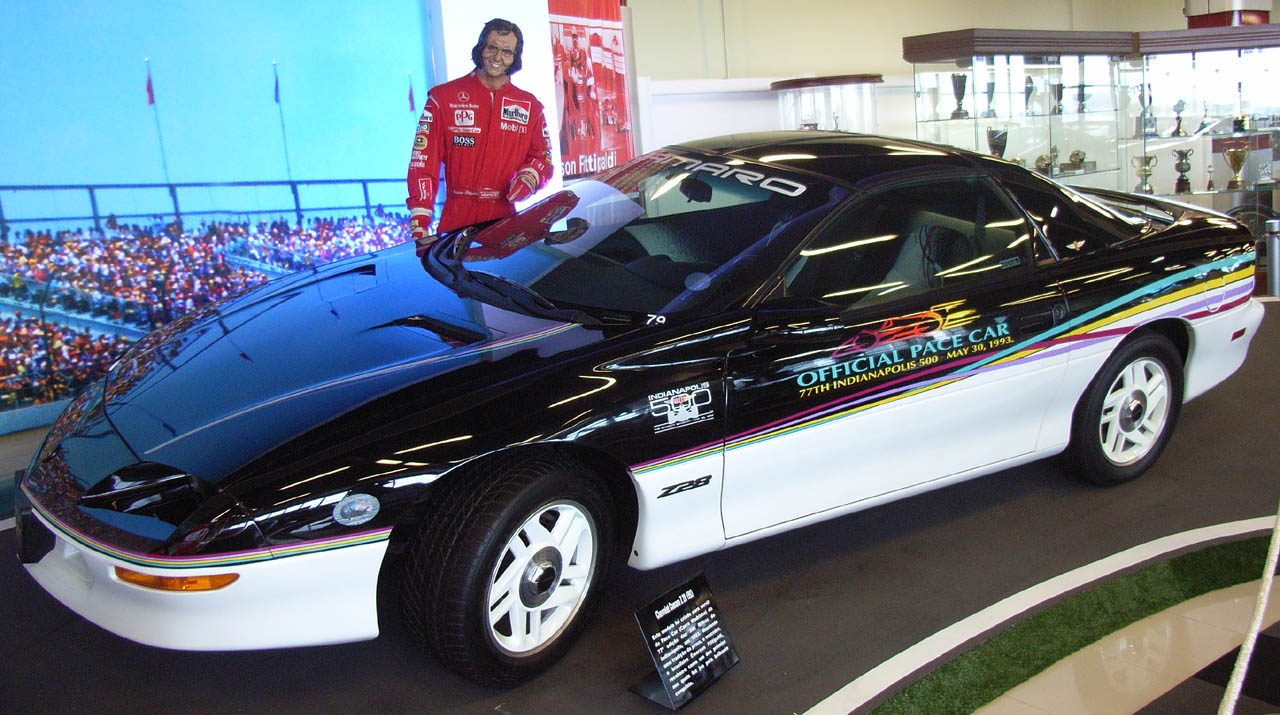
Chevrolet Camaro Z28, pace car in the 1993 Indianapolis 500

The first use of a pace car in automobile racing was at the inaugural Indy 500 in 1911. The officials at the Indianapolis Motor Speedway have been selecting a pace car and its driver for the Indy 500 each year since that first race. The first pace car was a Stoddard-Dayton driven by Carl G. Fisher. In recent years Chevrolet models have been chosen as the official pace car, owing to the ability for them to be used at both major automobile races at the Speedway (typically Corvette at the 500 and Impala at the 400). The pace car is selected two months before the race runs, allowing the manufacturer of the selected pace car to produce replicas of that year's car, which sell at a marked premium to collectors and race fans. Pace car replicas are often seen on the streets of Indianapolis weeks before the race is actually held, and a celebrity driver is usually used for the start of the race only.

In the last 50 years, the Pontiac Trans Am, Chevrolet Camaro, Chevrolet Corvette, Oldsmobile Cutlass, and Ford Mustang are the only models that have been selected as pace cars three or more times.

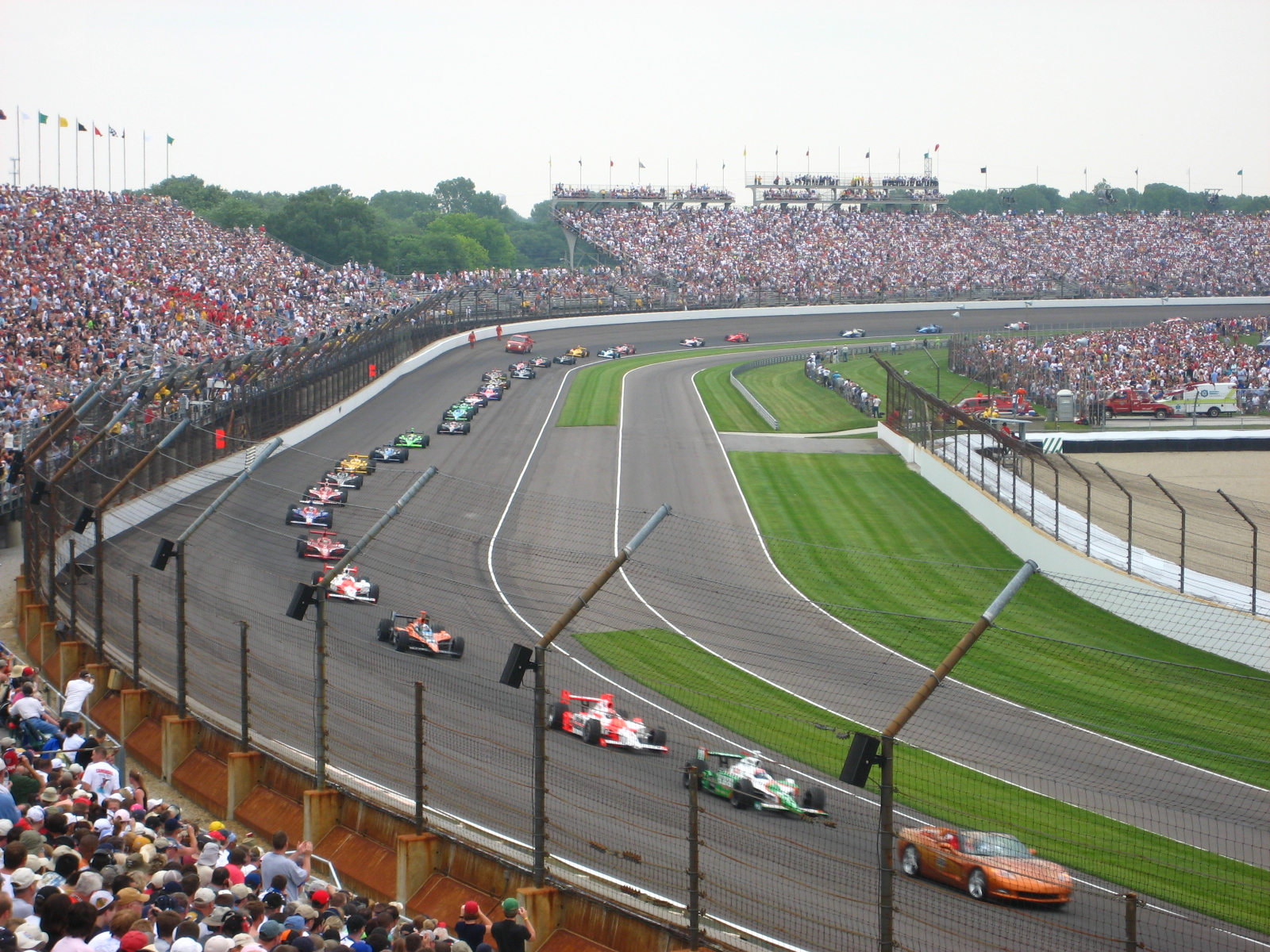
The pace car leads the field past an accident site at the 2007 Indianapolis 500.

During the IndyCar Series season, however, Johnny Rutherford, Sarah Fisher, and Oriol Servià are the normal drivers of the IRL pace car for all events. The pace car is deployed for debris, collision, or weather reasons. Since 1993, upon the waving of the yellow flag, pit road is closed until the pace car picks up the leader and passes the pit entrance the first time, unless track blockage forces the field to drive through pit lane. Another duty of the pace car is to lead the field around the course on parade laps prior to the start of the race. These increase in speed, allowing for a flying start of the race.

Furthermore, two other rule changes have been implemented. Since 2000, with one lap to go before going back to green, the pace car pulls off the track in turn one rather than in turn four. The current leader of the race is then assigned the task of pacing the field back to the green flag. After much consideration, this rule was added to prevent a situation much like the one that happened in the 1995 Indianapolis 500, when Scott Goodyear passed the pace car going back to green. In 2002, a "wave-around" rule was added, where the pace car waves by all competitors (if there are any) between the pace car and the actual leader of the race. This allows the leader to control the restart without any lapped cars in front of them. It also creates a strategy for cars to gain laps back, loosely resembling NASCAR's "Lucky dog" rule. However, the cars who get waved around are not allowed to pit until the green flag restarts the race (so they do not get the advantage of getting their lap back AND a free pit stop).

At other Indycar races, the pace car is usually a Honda Civic Type R or a Chevrolet Corvette.

== NASCAR ==
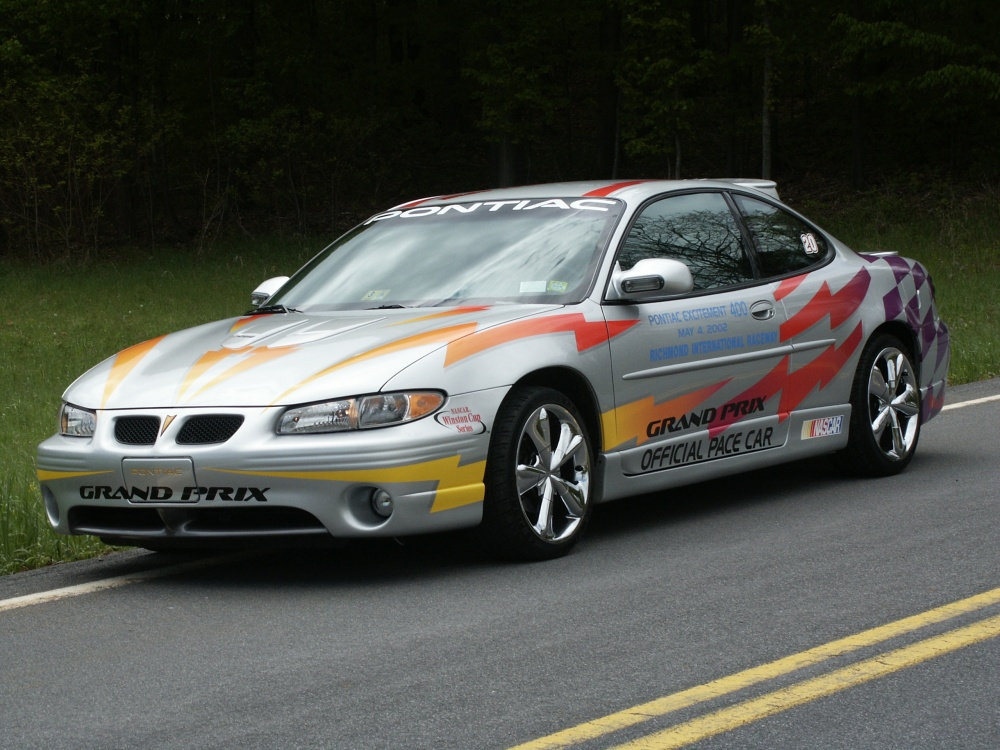
2001 Winston Cup (now NASCAR Cup Series) pace car – a modified 2001 Pontiac Grand Prix GTP coupe

In all NASCAR series, if the caution is out for debris, accident, or inclement weather, the flagman will display the yellow caution flag and the pace car will pull out of the pits and turn on the yellow strobes on top and/or behind the car. When race officials are ready to open pit lane, a green light will come on in the rear window of the safety car. One lap before a green flag, the pace car will shut off its lights to signal drivers to line up double file.

Unlike most series in motorsport, owing to NASCAR's short-track roots, each track usually offers its own safety car, typically from the manufacturer, but in recent years, it has been a local dealer or association of regional dealerships-provided Safety car. Tracks that use Toyota safety cars will use a Toyota Camry Hybrid, while Ford tracks will use a Ford Mustang, while Chevrolet tracks use a Chevrolet Camaro and most Dodge tracks use a Dodge Challenger. If a manufacturer is promoting a new vehicle, they will often use the new car instead of the standard-specification safety car.

For the Truck Series, which races pickup trucks instead of cars, the safety "car" is often a pickup. Tracks affiliated with a local or regional Chevrolet dealership will use a Chevrolet Silverado, while Chrysler dealership-affiliated tracks will use a Ram 1500. Ford-affiliated tracks will often use the F-Series, but Toyota-affiliated tracks are less likely to use the Toyota Tundra, but prefer marketing the Camry Hybrid. However, Ford and Toyota manufacturer sponsored tracks will prefer the Mustang and Camry, respectively, instead of a truck, and occasionally, pickup trucks have been used as pace vehicles for Cup Series and Xfinity races.

Since NASCAR does not allow speedometers or electronic speed limiting devices, the pace car circles the track at pit road speed during the warm-up laps. This allows each driver to note the RPM at which pit road speed is maintained. Drivers exceeding that speed on pit road will be penalized, typically a "drive-through" or "stop and go" penalty, costing them valuable track position.

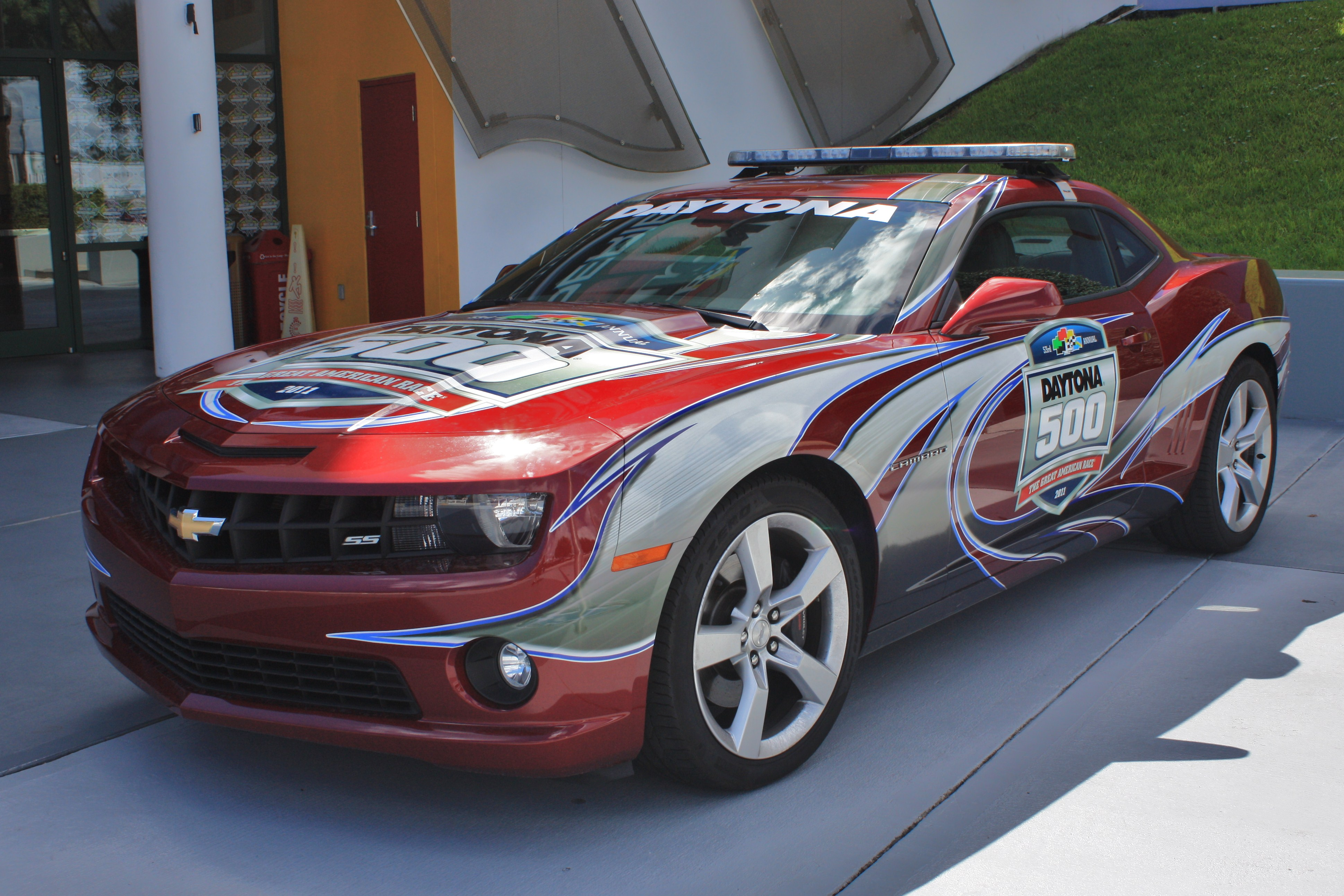
The pace car for the 2011 Daytona 500, a Chevrolet Camaro

Since mid-2004, NASCAR official Brett Bodine has driven the vehicle during official race functions during Cup Series races. Other famous NASCAR pace car drivers include Robert "Buster" Auton and Elmo Langley.

At many races, NASCAR has an honorary pace car driver that actually drives a car during the parade laps. Depending on the driver's skill, some drivers are allowed to pace the field right up to the dropping of the green flag. Some famous drivers have been Jay Leno, Richard Hammond, Luke Wilson, Rob Gronkowski, Guy Fieri and many others.

The beneficiary rule (informally known as the "lucky dog" rule) states once the safety car is deployed, the first car not on the lead lap will regain a lap. The Beneficiary will regain his lap once pit road opens. Bodine will signal that car to pass him through radio contact between NASCAR and that team. The free pass car must pit with the lapped cars.

After previous being trialed at the NASCAR All-Star Race, at the 2009 Pocono 500, NASCAR introduced a new "Double-file restart" rule that lines the field two cars on each row on every restart, similar to the start of the race, instead of lead-lap cars on the outside and lapped cars on the inside. Also, the "wave-around" rule, similar to what is enforced in racing series sanctioned by IndyCar, was adopted to ensure the first car on the restart is the leader, and ensure there are no lapped cars ahead of the leader.

== Grand Prix motorcycle racing ==
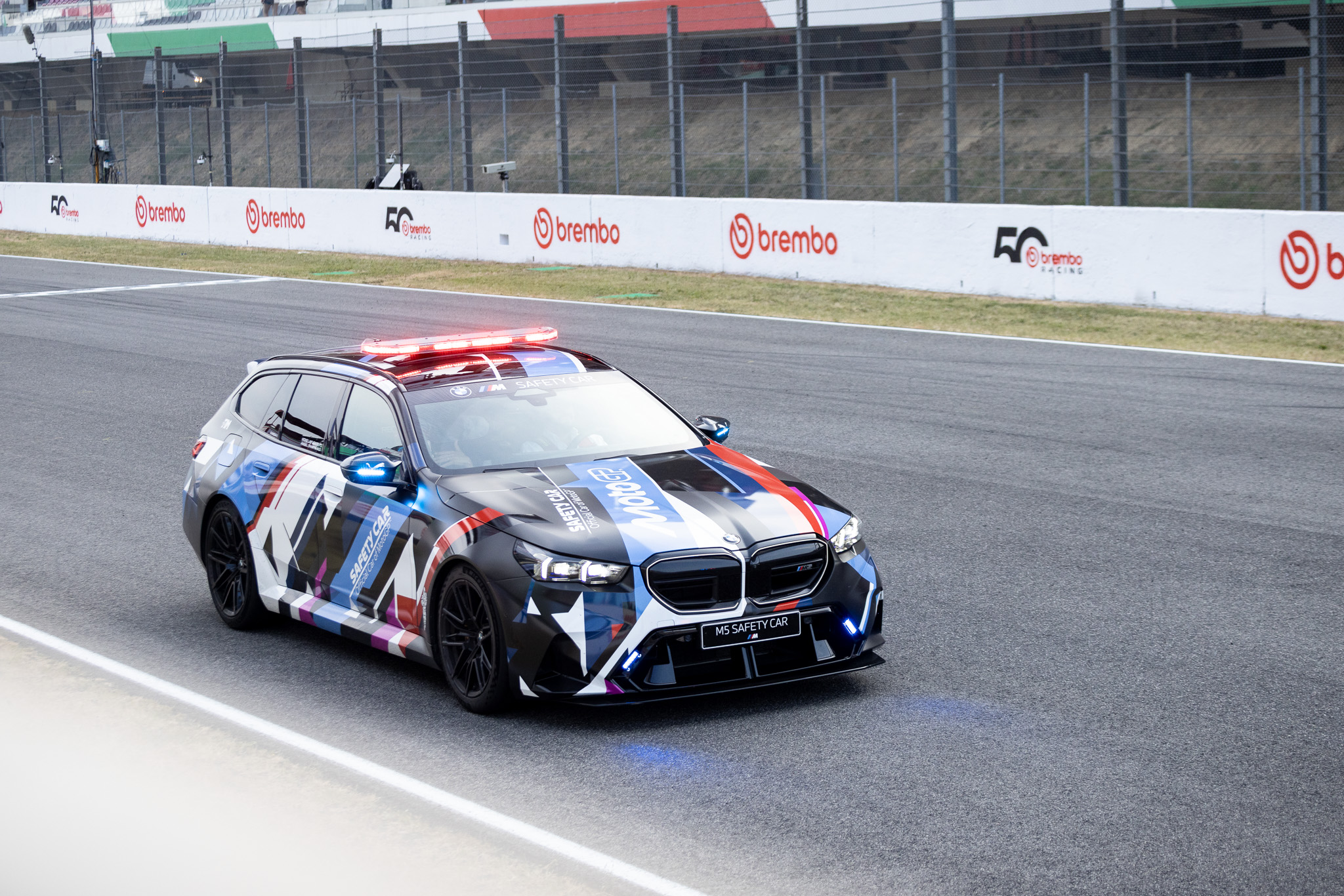
BMW M5 (G90) safety car at the 2025 Italian motorcycle Grand Prix

In Grand Prix motorcycle racing (MotoGP), the safety car is deployed during the sighting lap, warm-up lap, and the first lap of a race. The safety car is also deployed to assess track conditions or weather conditions.

The supplier of the safety car in Grand Prix motorcycle racing is BMW M since 1999.

Unlike Formula 1 and other auto racing series, the safety car is not used to control the field during yellow flag period.

== Incidents with safety cars and other course cars ==
=== 2024 NASCAR Cup Series Championship Race ===
Before the Stage 2 restart of the 2024 NASCAR Cup Series Championship Race, the 2024 Toyota Camry XSE pace car abruptly turned down and cut across the front of race leader Chase Elliott in an attempt to avoid missing the pit entrance. The pace car crashed into the sand barrels placed at the end of the pit lane wall, necessitating the backup pace car coming out. The restart was waved off, and the race was eventually red flagged on lap 69 to allow marshals to clean up and replace the barrels.

=== 2024 Italian Grand Prix ===
During a reconnaissance lap, a 2024 Aston Martin Vantage safety car spun out and crashed heavily at the Alboreto corner of the Monza Circuit on the Thursday of the 2024 Italian Grand Prix. Both the passenger and the driver, Bernd Mayländer, were safe, and no interruptions were reported as there was another safety car at the site if needed. The race itself went on without any safety car deployments, extending a streak of such that started after the 2024 Spanish Grand Prix.

=== 2023 IndyCar Monterey Grand Prix ===
The high amount of caution laps during the 2023 Firestone Grand Prix of Monterey resulted in extended use of the Honda Civic pace car. This eventually led to the pace car almost running out of fuel. The Civic was then shown being refuelled by hand.

=== 2018 Chevrolet Detroit Grand Prix Race #2 ===
During the opening pace laps of the 2018 Chevrolet Detroit Grand Prix IndyCar race (the second race of a doubleheader weekend at the Belle Isle street circuit), a 2019 Chevrolet Corvette ZR1 pace car leading the field and being driven by General Motors executive Mark Reuss lost control and crashed head-on into the left-hand retaining wall coming out of the exit of turn two of the track, shortly after leaving pit road. Neither Reuss nor Mark Sandy, an IndyCar official who was a passenger in the car, were injured in the crash and were able to exit the vehicle after the crash. The cars participating in the race, except one driven by Alexander Rossi, stopped on the track behind the wrecked car as safety crews and track workers cleaned up debris from the accident and removed the damaged vehicle. Rossi, who was to start the race from the pole position and was directly behind the pace car when the incident occurred, was the only driver to drive past the crash and returned to pit road afterwards, causing concern to his crew that he may have run over debris from the crash causing a puncture (though no damage to his car or tires was done). Approximately 20 minutes after the crash, the cars that were still on the track had their engines re-fired and were directed to drive to pit road in order to reset the starting grid for the race start. An identical back-up pace car of the same make and model was brought out to pace the field, this time driven by former IndyCar driver and official Oriol Servià who regularly drove the pace car during caution periods. The incident delayed the start of the race by over 30 minutes from its scheduled start time of 3:50pm local time. The race eventually went green sometime past 4:20pm.

=== 2014 Sprint Unlimited ===
Before the start of the final segment of the Sprint Cup Series' Sprint Unlimited exhibition race at Daytona, the Chevrolet SS pace car caught fire and stopped off the track, delaying the restart. The fire was believed to have started in a trunk-mounted battery pack powering the lights.

=== 2012 Daytona 500 ===
During a safety car situation on Lap 160 of the 2012 Daytona 500, Earnhardt Ganassi Racing driver Juan Pablo Montoya's car had a suspension part failure, and it lost control on turn 3, sharply veering into a safety truck and jet dryer trailer and causing a giant fireball. Sparks were seen emanating from Montoya's car right before its hard collision with the jet dryer trailer and left driver's side of the truck. Montoya was treated at the infield care center and released unhurt. The driver of the Chevrolet Silverado Crew Cab, Duane Barnes, was taken to a local hospital for observation and was resting comfortably. He was an employee at Michigan International Speedway, a sister track of Daytona. The tracks often share jet dryer equipment on race weekends to help in case of rain such as the case on Sunday, the original scheduled start time of the race. The entire incident took about two hours to clean up before the last 40 (later extended to 42 due to a green–white–checkered finish) laps were able to be completed.

NASCAR subsequently added the use of the second safety car (used during race start situations) to protect the last jet dryer in other safety car situations.

=== 2011 6 Hours of Castellet ===
The 2011 6 Hours of Castellet got off to a controversial start when the pace car did not return to the pits when the green lights came on. The front running LMPs slowed down but some of the GT cars could not react fast enough, resulting in collisions and heavy damage to all three GTE Pro class Porsches which caused them to retire. The GTE Am class IMSA Performance Matmut Porsche and GTE Pro JOTA Aston Martin were also caught up in the carnage.

=== 2009 WTCC Pau ===
An accident occurred during the 2009 FIA WTCC Race of France in Pau, France. A succession of first-lap accidents caused the safety car to be placed on standby, with yellow flags waving on the start-finish section of the track. The safety car driver - a local politician - then proceeded to drive onto the track at slow speed, without official approval, moving across the pit exit line immediately after exiting the pits, instead of confining to the inside of it until the line ended. Race leader Franz Engstler came through the kink on the start-finish straight and was unable to avoid hitting the side of the pace car. Engstler commented "I saw the safety car coming out from the right and realized that I had no chance to brake... I really do not understand why he was going out of the pits". After this incident, the Portuguese Bruno Correia was appointed as the official safety car driver.

=== 2008 Dutch Supercar Challenge Spa ===
A safety car caused a crash during the 2008 Dutch Supercar Challenge race at Spa Francorchamps. The Seat Leon was released too late, allowing the leading Marcos LM600 to pass while erroneously identifying the Audi TT DTM in 2nd and Mosler MT900R GT3 in 3rd as 'the leading pack.' Race officials immediately realized their mistake, and the safety car was instructed to slow down and let the entire field pass.

As the safety car was exiting turn 11, an approaching Lamborghini Gallardo GT3 drastically reduced its speed in response to the unusually slow safety car. However, a BMW a few seconds behind came around the blind turn at speed, colliding with the Gallardo and safety car. The collision destroyed the Gallardo and sent the BMW into a number of rolls. The safety car was sent off the track into the Armco safety barrier at great speed. In the chaos, a Marcos LM600 coming around turn 11 locked up its brakes and spun into the wet grass on the inside of the track. Sliding back onto the track, it was hit from the side by a BMW Z3. Furthermore, two E46 BMW M3 GTRs were damaged: one on the outside line hit the rear of the Marcos, and the other, on the inside line, slightly damaged its front right. The second M3 continued around the track, while the first slid into the grass before turn 12. The race was stopped, and there were no serious injuries to any of the drivers.

=== 1999 FirstPlus Financial 200 ===
On lap 57, ARCA driver Joe Cooksey ran into the back of the Pontiac Grand Prix pace car driven by Jack Wallace totaling the pace car, to quote Cooksey: "It might be the first time in history the pace car has been wiped out."

=== 1995 Hungarian Grand Prix ===
After Footwork Arrows driver Taki Inoue retired due to an engine failure, he attempted to assist the marshals in extinguishing the engine fire, but he was hit by the Tatra 623 safety car. The incident injured his leg, though he would recover in time for the following Belgian Grand Prix.

=== 1986 Winston 500 ===
Before the start of the race, a drunken fan stole the pace car and drove a lap around Talladega Superspeedway. Local police quickly pursued the fan around the track, setting up a roadblock at the exit of Turn 4 that led to his arrest.

=== 1971 Indianapolis 500 ===
The pace car of the 1971 Indianapolis 500, an orange Dodge Challenger driven by local auto dealer Eldon Palmer, crashed at the start of the race. As Palmer drove the car off into the pit lane to let the race cars begin the race, he lost control of the car and crashed into a photographer stand. There were no fatalities, and the number of people reported injured has ranged from 18 to 29.

== See also ==
- Zero cars, similar cars used in rallying to open roads to rally competitors
- Pacemaker (running)
