= Pacing lights =

Visual pace-setting systems used in running

Pacing lights are visual pace-setting systems for middle- and long-distance running. The system has lights along a running track or course. The lights come on in sequence and show a selected speed. Athletes can follow the moving light. Spectators can compare the athletes with a target time. Coaches and race organizers use pacing lights in training and competition.

== History ==
From 1973 through 1976, the professional International Track Association used pacing lights on its circuit. The system had large bulbs in protective housings on the inside of a track. Personnel set a target time in the system. The electronic start unit started the lights. The bulbs then flashed in sequence around the track. The association used the lights as a pacing aid and as a display for spectators.

In 2006, B. Heller and Steve Haake reported a pacing-light system for tests of walking and running. The system had a thin strip of surface-mounted light-emitting diodes in a gait-laboratory floor. The lights came on in sequence and gave a visual speed signal. One person did the comparison test at five speeds. The light system usually caused less speed variation than verbal instructions or a metronome.

Visual pacing technology returned to high-level distance running in the late 2010s. The Wavelight system entered international track competition in 2020. World Athletics changed its technical rules in November 2019. The new rule permitted electronic lights that showed progressive times, including record times. In 2025, the 2025 European Athletics Indoor Championships used pacing lights. This was their first use at a major championship.

== Operation ==
Most modern systems have individually controlled LEDs along the inner edge or curb of a track. A control unit starts each light at the necessary time. The sequence makes a moving light signal. The speed of this signal is the target speed. Thus, the runner gets continuous position information. Lap clocks and verbal split times give information only at set points.

== Uses ==
For training, coaches set the lights to the planned speed. The runner can follow the light and does not have to look at a watch.

For competition, organizers can set a record pace or a different performance target. At the 2025 European indoor championships, organizers used the lights for these purposes:

- Show a guide pace in heats.
- Show record times.
- Show qualifying times.

Spectators can see the distance between the athletes and the target.

== Effects and debate ==
Pacing strategy affects distance-running performance. An even pace can prevent unnecessary changes in running speed. Taylor, Atkinson, and Best said that pacing lights can improve performance. According to their analysis, the lights help runners keep an even pace after human pacemakers leave a race.

Researchers disagree about the use of pacing lights in record attempts. A 2024 viewpoint said that technology-assisted records must have a different classification. The authors said that continuous pace information can decrease changes in speed.

A response article described pacing lights as a tactical feedback tool. Its authors estimated an effect of less than one percent. They said that advanced footwear technology has a larger effect.

== See also ==
- Pacemaker (running)
- Pacing strategies in track and field
