= Pacemaker (running) =

Runner who sets the pace in a race for other competitors

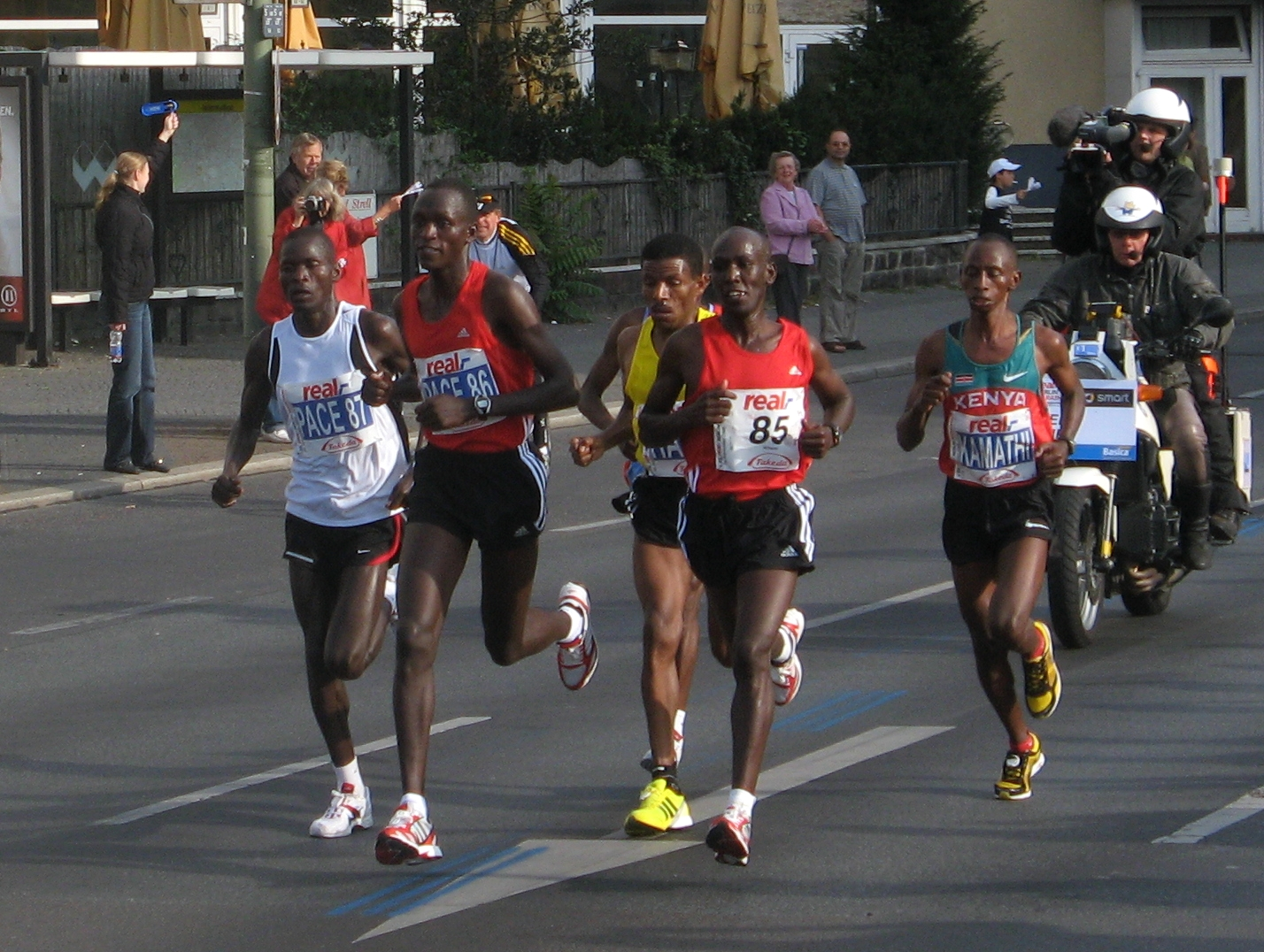
Rabbits Abel Kirui, Elijah Keitany and Wilson Kigen pacing Haile Gebrselassie and Charles Kamathi at the Berlin Marathon 2008

A pacemaker or pacesetter, sometimes informally called a rabbit, is a runner who leads a middle- or long-distance running event for the first section to ensure a high speed and to avoid excessive tactical racing. A competitor who chooses the tactic of leading in order to win is called a front-runner rather than a pacemaker.

Pacemakers are frequently employed by race organisers for world record attempts with specific instructions for lap times, or helping runners know where their invisible "opponent" predecessor is at that stage of the race. Some athletes have essentially become professional pacemakers. Pacemakers may be used to avoid deceptive tactics by competitors who, for example, race away from the start line and are likely to subsequently slow down, giving the other runners the impression that they are far behind. A trusted team of pacemakers who are paid to keep the runners at a speed that they can manage for the rest of the race become useful in such a situation. Pacemakers can also facilitate drafting and convey tangible pacing information during a race.

For amateur runners, pacemakers assist in reaching personal goals. In marathons, for example, there are often pacemakers for 3 hours, 3.5, and 4 hours, etc. Such pace-setters are referred to as a pacing bus or bus in South African races. This role differs from ultramarathon running, where pacers typically join individual runners partway through the race to provide support and companionship rather than setting the overall race pace.

Flashing lights in the side of tracks set to a specific pace were an innovation introduced in 1972 by the professional International Track Association to provide visual excitement to their races. The Wavelight system using LEDs became common at major competitions in the early 2020s and is permitted by World Athletics for record ratification.

== History ==
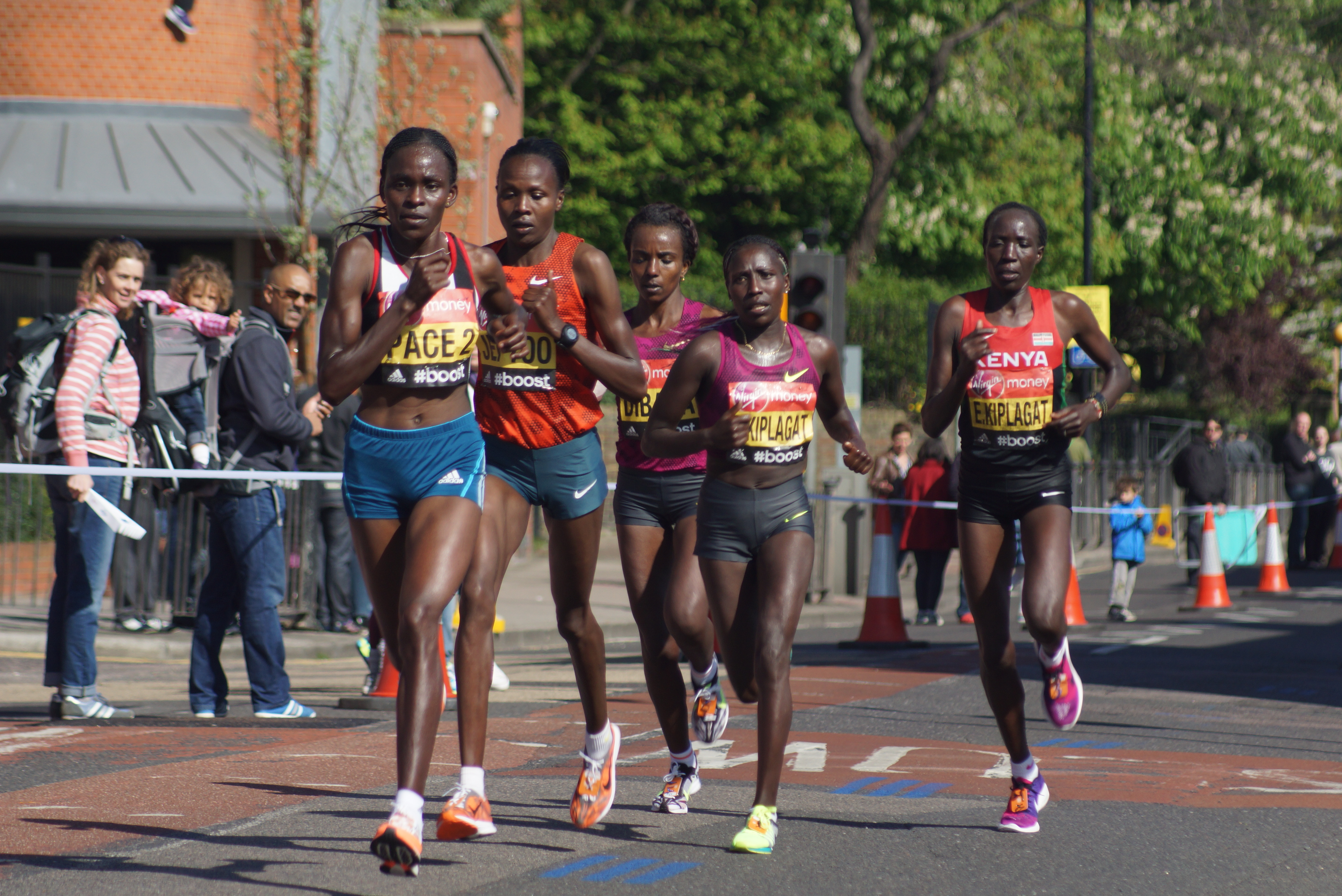
Pacemaker (on the left) at London Marathon 2014

The use of pacemaking increased after Chris Brasher and Chris Chataway successfully paced Roger Bannister to break the four-minute mile for the first time in 1954.

Purists argue that employing pacemakers detracts from the competitive nature of racing. Original rules frowned on a competitor who was not actively trying to win, and pacemakers were required to finish a race for any record to count. This rule was later dropped, though the pacemaker must start with the other competitors as a registered entrant. A lapped competitor may not act as a pacemaker.

Ben Jipcho acted as a pacemaker for Kenyan teammate Kipchoge Keino in the 1968 Olympic men's 1500m, allowing Keino's sustained speed to build up enough of a lead to counteract rival Jim Ryun's fast kick finish. Whereas most pacemakers are shorter-distance runners assisting in a longer-distance record attempt, Jipcho's favoured events were longer than 1500m, and there was no prospect of breaking a record.

The 1500 metres at the Bislett Games in 1981 became part of track folklore when star athletes including Steve Ovett chose not to follow pacemaker Tom Byers but race among themselves. Ovett's last lap was almost 10 seconds faster than Byers's, but Byers, though a pacemaker, held on to win by a few metres. There was a similar case in the 1994 Los Angeles Marathon when veteran marathoner Paul Pilkington was paid to set a fast pace then drop out. When the elite athletes failed to follow his pace, he kept going, ultimately winning US$27,000 and a new Mercedes car, to the surprise of the expected favourites. That year, the L.A. Marathon was the National Championship race, so he also became the United States National Champion. Brazilian Vanderlei De Lima, later the marathon bronze medalist in the 2004 Summer Olympics, was a pacemaker at the Reims Marathon in 1994. It was his first competitive marathon, and he was supposed to be a pacemaker up to the 21-kilometre (13-mile) point, but won the race.

During the Berlin Marathon in 2000, Simon Biwott was hired as a pacemaker, but crossed the finish line as the winner.

The rules for pacemakers specify that not more than three of them are dedicated to one group of runners.

In the 2003 Berlin Marathon, Paul Tergat (Kenya) set a new world record with 2:04:55; pacemaker Sammy Korir finished 1 second behind in second place. At 34.5 km (21.5 miles) into the run, Korir tried, unsuccessfully, to make a move on Tergat.

In the April 2024 Beijing Half-Marathon, He Jie had his medal revoked when it was discovered, by a special committee, that three pacemakers deliberately slowed down to let him win. The event operators apologized saying they were unaware that one of their sponsors had hired four pacemakers (one pacemaker did not finish the race). The committee disqualified the operator from hosting the Beijing Half Marathon and banned the sponsor from sponsoring any more races this season. When interviewing one of the pacemakers, they responded, "I was hired to be a pacemaker, not to win the race."

Pacemakers are also used in horse racing, where in "classic" distance races (over 1 mile or 8 furlongs or 1.5 kilometres) horses that are better at sprint distances (roughly 5–6 1/2 furlongs or 1.0–1.3 kilometres) may be entered into major races specifically to set the pace for the top horses from the same stable. On a few occasions, pacemakers have finished ahead of the horses they were setting the pace for, such as when Summoner won the 2001 Queen Elizabeth II Stakes, and At First Sight running second in the 2010 Epsom Derby ahead of his two more-favoured stablemates.

== See also ==
- Domestique
- Pacing strategies in track and field
