= Negative split =

Racing strategy where the second half is faster than the first half

A negative split is a racing strategy that involves completing the second half of a race faster than the first half. It is defined by the intentional setting of a slower initial pace, followed by a gradual or sudden increase of speed towards the end of the race. Alternate strategies include even splitting (racing at a steady pace) or sit and kick (also known as a sprint finish). Conversely, the act of completing the first half of a race faster than the second half is known as a positive split.

The strategy of negative splitting has been documented in competitive running since the early 20th century. Runners such as Steve Prefontaine, Wilson Kipsang, and Galen Rupp have used it in races.

Negative split strategies are also used in swimming (including Janet Evans's 1988 Olympic gold in the 400 m freestyle) cycling, triathlon and horse racing.

== Similar strategies ==
The strategies discussed below are easily confused with negative splits, because the racer can appear to be negative splitting when they really are not.

=== Even splitting ===
Even splitting is a racing strategy where the runner aims for a precise lap time. To do this, the runner must run the same split for every lap (or other distance considered a split) to hit the time. For example, if a runner wants to finish a 1600-meter race in 4:40, on a 400-meter track, the runner would have to hit 70 seconds a lap, with each lap counting as a split to achieve this goal. To use this strategy, the runner must run their own pace and not get pulled ahead or behind by the other competitors. If the runner falls behind and runs the first part more slowly than intended, they can replace their strategy with a negative split to make up for the time lost earlier in the race.

One of the best examples of even splitting comes from Dave Wottle in the 1972 Olympics in the 800-meter finals. Wottle ran a 1:45 for that race, even splitting 26 seconds for each 200-meter split. Because the other runners in the race ran so fast at the beginning and slowed at the end, Wottle's finish was much faster.

In 2019, Eliud Kipchoge attempted to perform even splitting in the Ineos 1:59 Challenge, in which he attempted to run a marathon distance in under two hours. In order to achieve this time, each 5 km split would need to be completed in 14 minutes 13 seconds, producing a time of 1 hour 59 minutes 59.5 seconds. But in reality, all the 5 km splits were run within five seconds of each other, with every split past the 10 km point being between 14:12 and 14:14. This meant that the race was not run as an even split, but that there was only a 0.5% difference between the slowest and fastest splits, with no obvious pattern of slowing down or speeding up as the race progressed.

=== Sit and kick ===
This strategy, also known as a sprint finish, relies on the runner hanging with the lead pack for the majority of the race, not pushing the pace or trying to break away, until the bell lap or final section of the race. The runner then makes a kick—increases pace—with all their remaining energy. This strategy relies on the runner having a better kick than the rest of the field. Sitting and kicking can also be confused with negative splitting, especially if the runner employing this strategy makes their kick move earlier than the last 300 meters or so of a race.

== Athletes using negative splits ==
=== Kenenisa Bekele ===
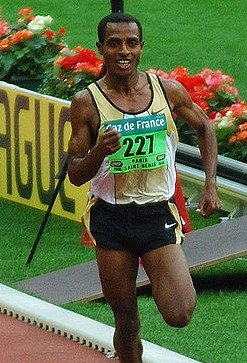
Kenenisa Bekele

Considered by many to be among the greatest runners of all time, Kenenisa Bekele has employed negative split strategies in many of his races and all of his world records.

Most notably, every kilometer in his 5000 meter world-record run of 12:37 was about one second faster than the last. His splits per kilometer were 2:33, 2:32, 2:31, 2:30, 2:29.

=== Steve Prefontaine ===
One of the most noted runners in the United States, Steve Prefontaine used negative splits to train and compete in high school. In one example, Prefontaine's goal was to run a 9:44 two-mile, requiring a 73-second pace per lap. Instead of running a flat pace, Prefontaine's coach, Walt McClure, had him run the first six laps at 75 seconds per lap. This put the runner 12 seconds over the pace, at 7:30, at the end of the sixth lap, leaving the last two laps to make up time by negative splitting a 70-second seventh lap and then a 65-second final lap.

=== Wilson Kipsang ===
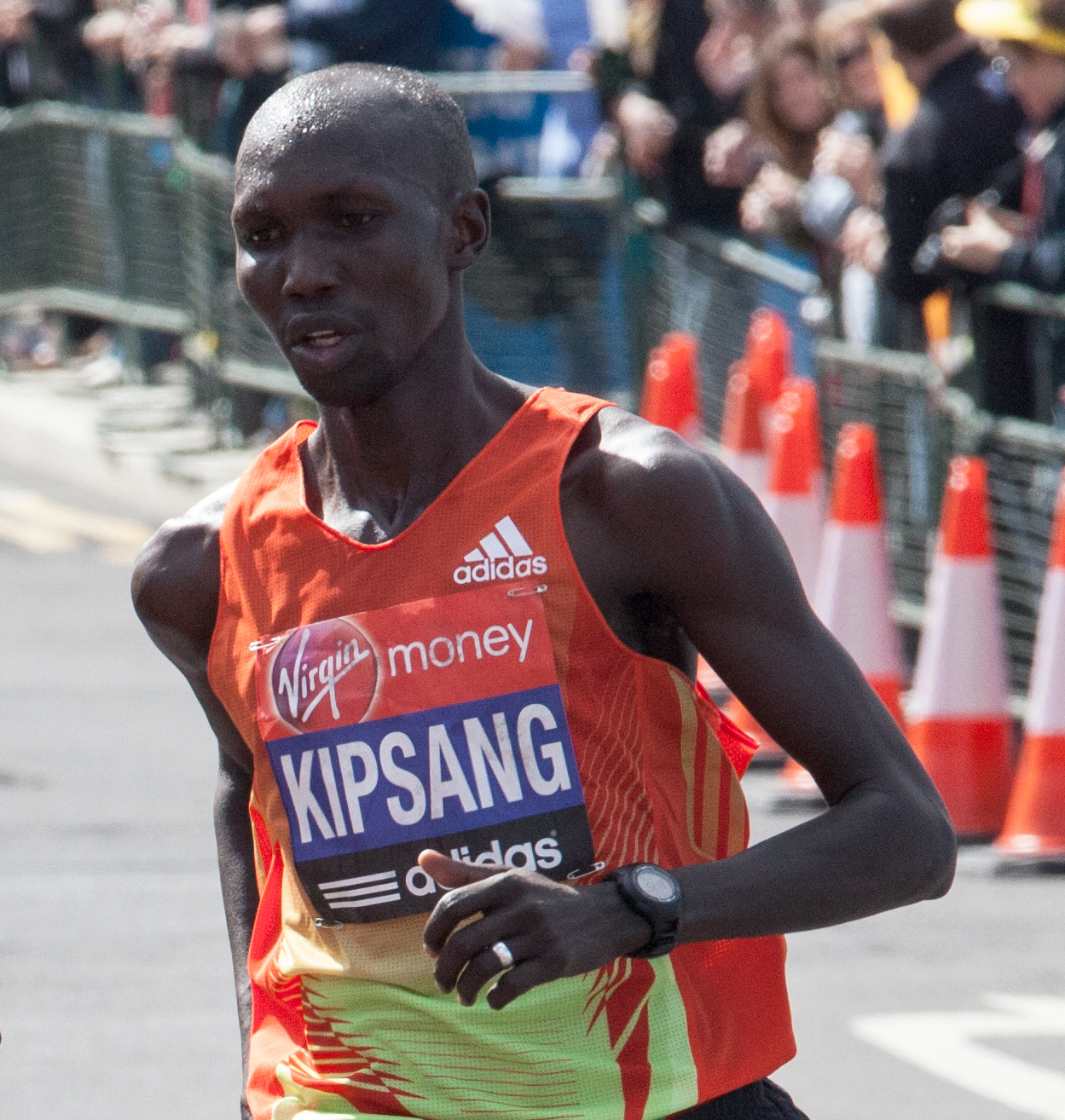
Wilson Kipsang

Kipsang has the 48th fastest marathon time, at 2 hours 3 minutes and 23 seconds, at the 2013 Berlin Marathon. Kipsang ran a year earlier, at the 2012 Honolulu Marathon, finishing with a time of 2 hours 12 minutes and 31 seconds. He won this marathon by negative splitting. Kipsang came through the half waypoint in 1 hour 7 minutes and 7 seconds. He finished the second half of the marathon in 1 hour 5 minutes and 24 seconds.

=== Galen Rupp ===
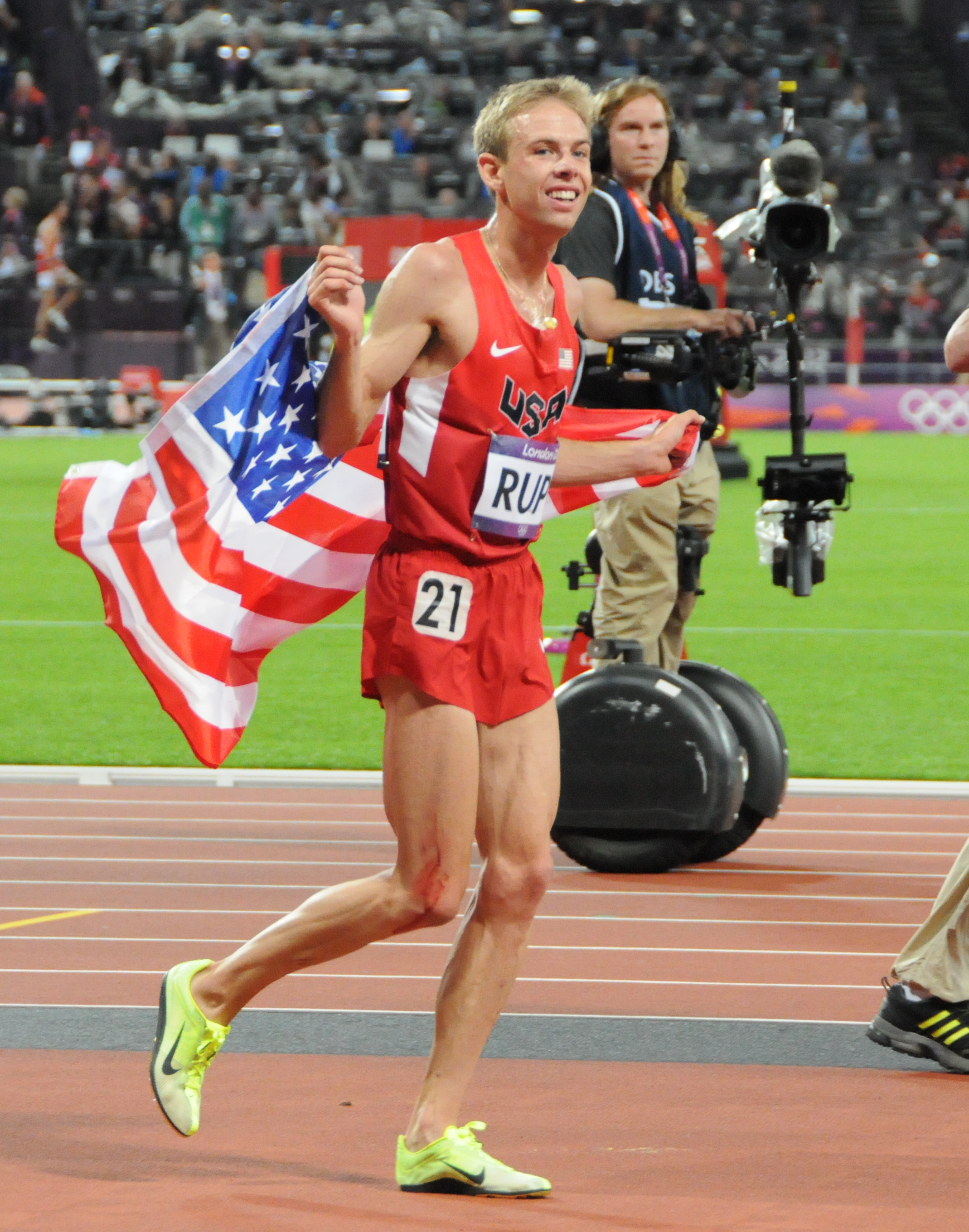
Galen Rupp

Galen Rupp, an Olympic silver medalist, set a new U.S. record in the 5000-meter race, hitting 13 minutes 1 second at the Boston University Multi-Team Meet. He negative split the race, with his first mile at 4 minutes and 14 seconds, the second mile at 4 minutes and 12 seconds, the third mile at 4 minutes and 4 seconds, leaving his final 200 meters in 30 seconds.

== Advantages of negative splitting ==
- Negative splitting helps build discipline, subverting the natural instinct to begin running as fast as possible. It takes self-restraint to allow others to run ahead and not be pulled along.
- Starting slow allows the runner's body to compensate for the lactic acid production and low oxygen levels that result from exertion. Lactic acid buildup may cause a runner to slow down unintentionally.
- Progressively increasing speed in any race allows the runner to focus on passing each person running directly ahead.
