= MTX Tatra V8 =

Car model

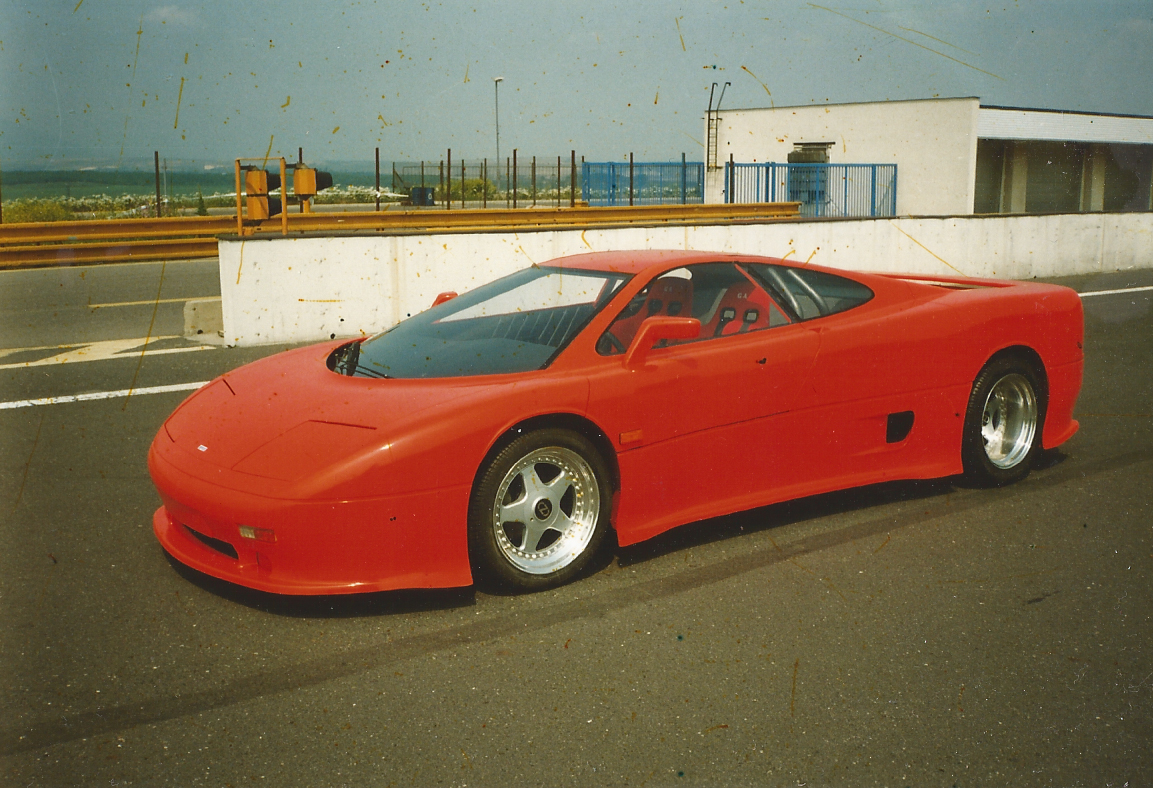
MTX Tatra V8 - first prototype

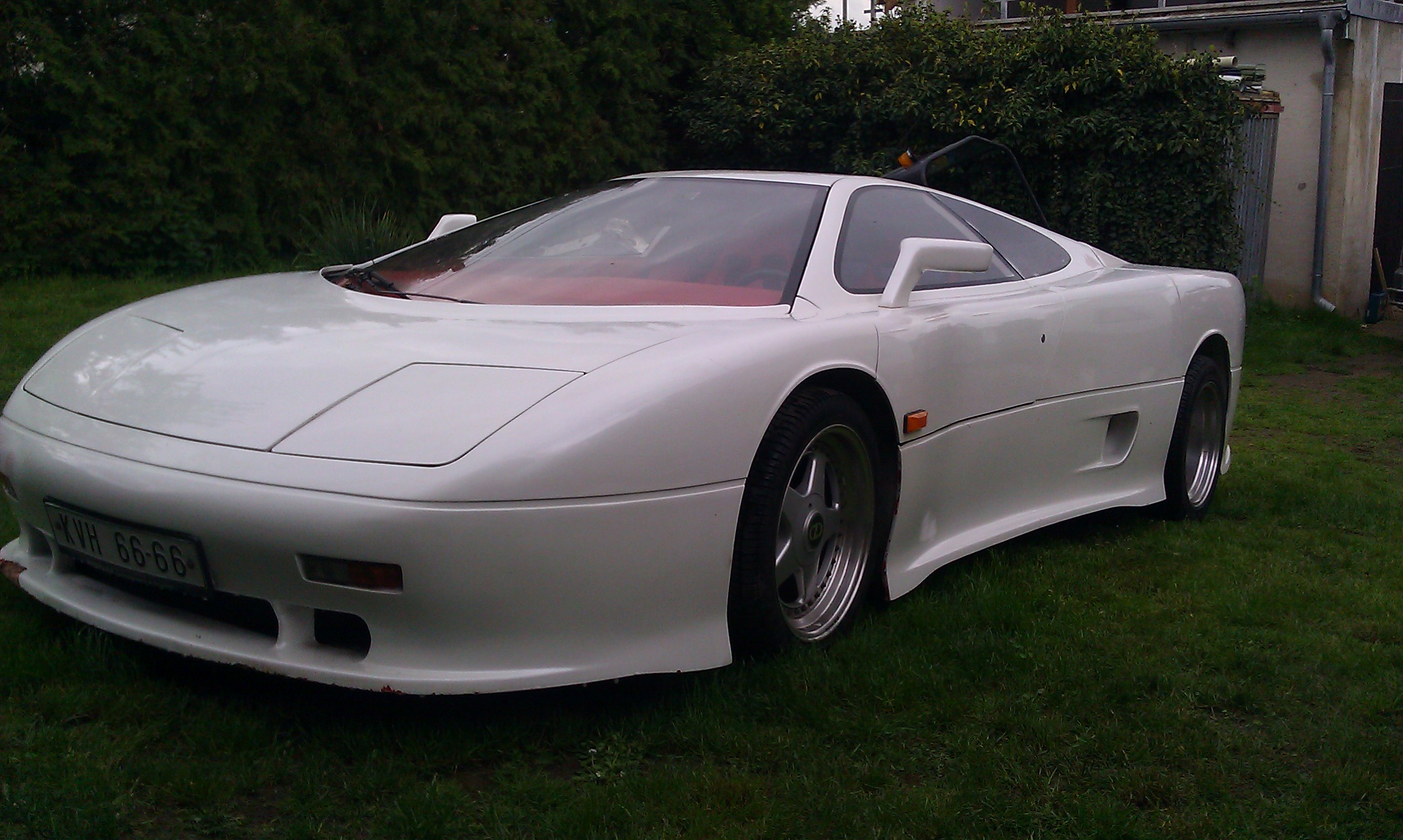
MTX Tatra V8 - second prototype

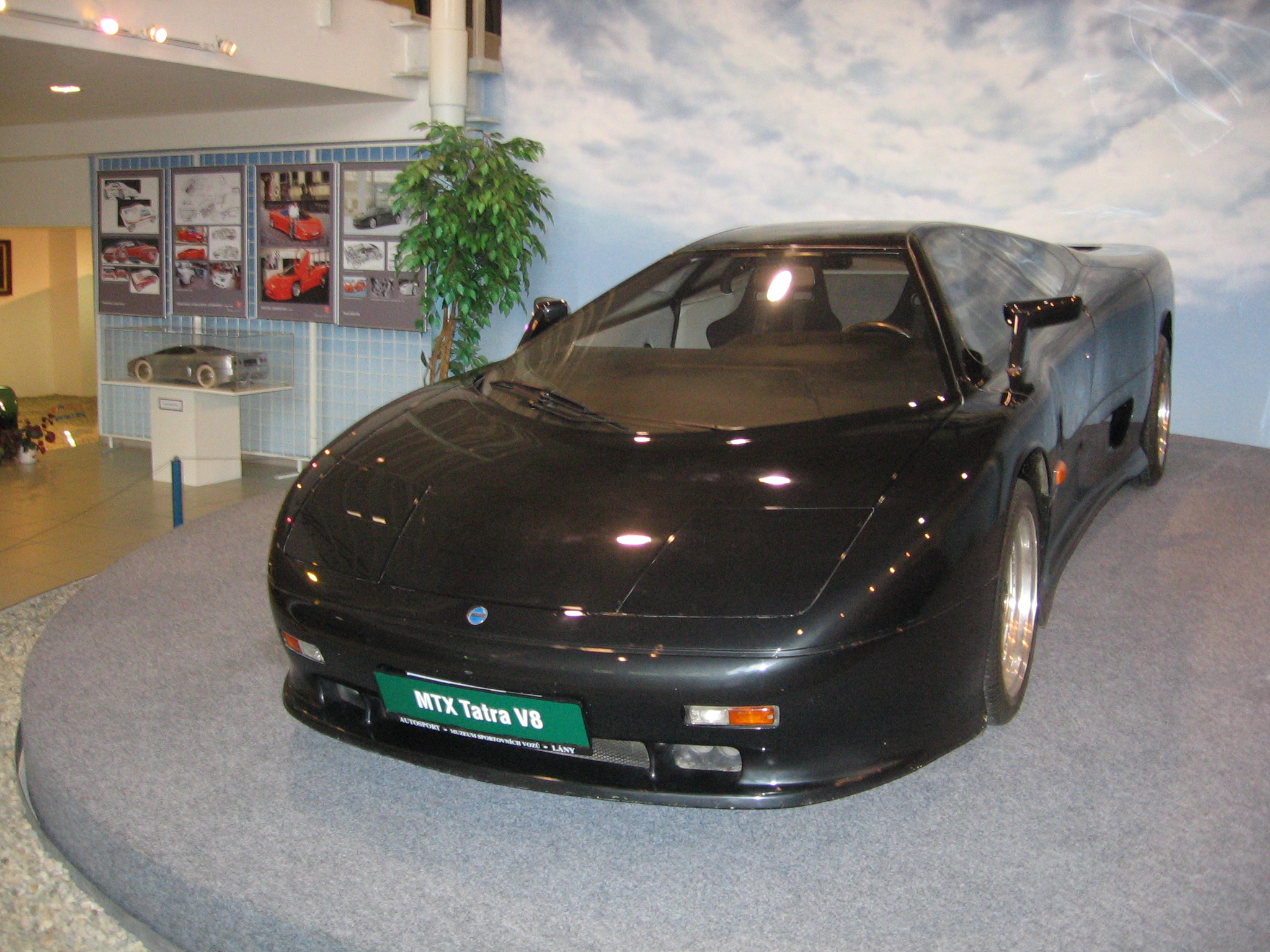
MTX Tatra V8 - third prototype, now in Sports Car Museum Lány

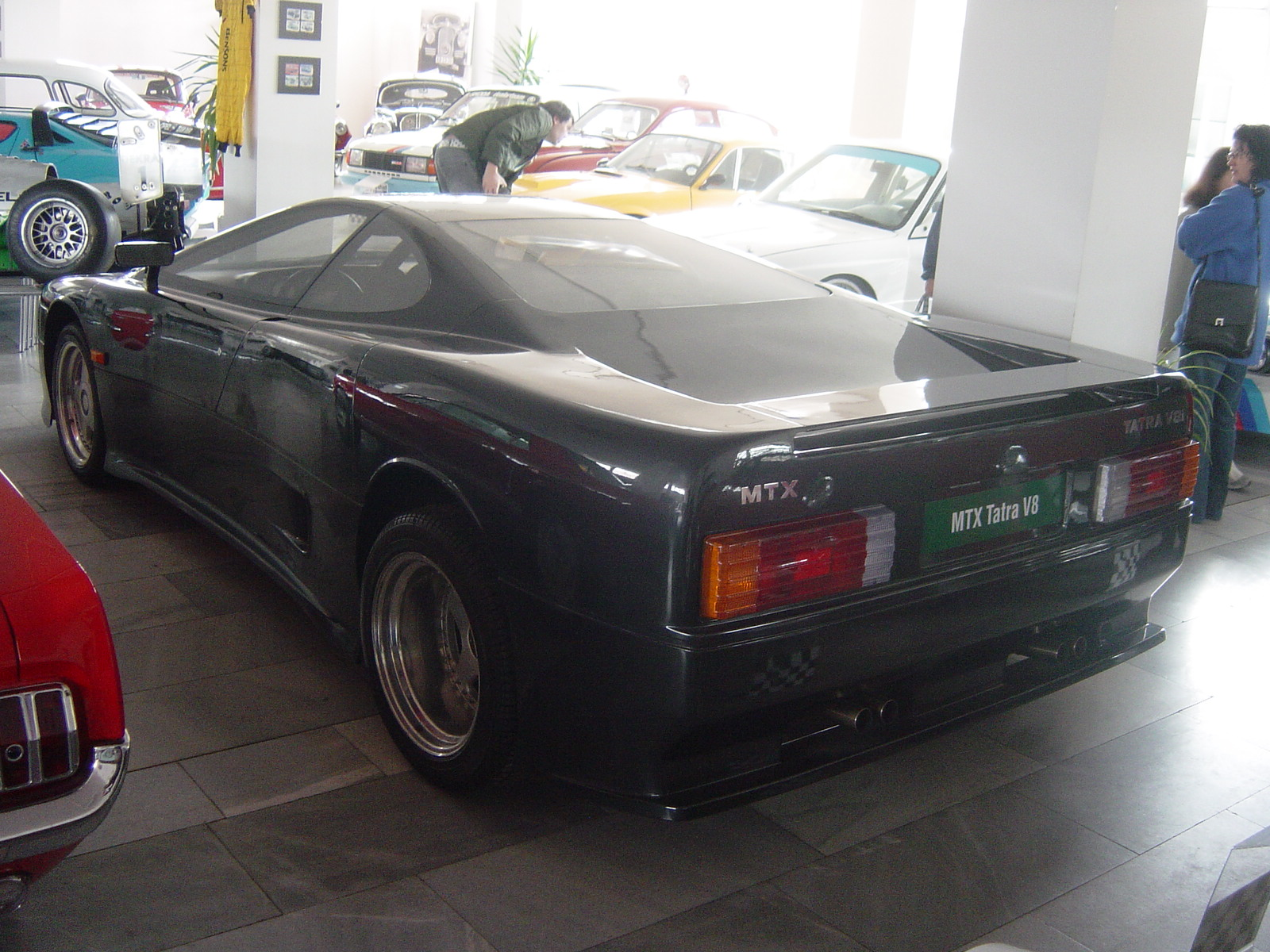
Rear view

The Metalex MTX Tatra V8 (also known as the Metalex MTX V8 GT 3900 in Western Europe) was a super-sports car produced by MTX in cooperation with Tatra in 1991. It was designed by Czech automobile designer Václav Král and was the fastest Czech car of that time. It has a Tatra 3.9 litre V8 with a rated power of 225 kW (306 PS; 302 hp) at 6500 rpm, it has scissor doors opening vertically and pop-up headlamps. Acceleration from 0 to 100 km/h (0-62 mph) is given as 5.6 seconds and the maximum speed is 265 km/h (165 mph).

After it passed driving tests at the Tatra polygon races at Kopřivnice, at the airport in Mošnov and at the Autodrom Most, it was finally introduced to the public in October 1991 at the auto show in Prague. After that, MTX received almost 200 orders for the car, so the company started production of a limited series of 100 units. When the project was sold to a new owner during the early stages of production, the factory suffered a fire that forever terminated volume manufacturing of the car.

Only four Tatra MTX V8s were ever built; a red and a white one that have Czech private owners, a black one that is exhibited in the Sports Car Museum in Lány, and a fourth was reportedly delivered as a kit to the United States. In 2010 the car appeared in the Kanye West film Runaway, which was recorded in Prague, Czech Republic.

== Specifications ==
- wheelbase: 2,400 mm (94.5 in)
- length: 4,600 mm (181.1 in)
- weight: 1,350 kg (2,976 lb)
- tyre sizes: wheels OZ Racing, tyres Pirelli P Zero 245/40 ZR-17 front, 335/35 ZR-17 back
- motor: Tatra 623, air-cooled V8 32v DOHC
- displacement: 3,919 cc (3.9L)
- max. power : 160 kW (218 PS; 215 hp) at 6,000 rpm, 225 kW (306 PS; 302 hp) at 6,500 rpm (injection version)
- top speed: 246 km/h, 265 km/h (injection version)
- 0–100 km/h (0-62 mph): 6.2 s, 5.6 s (injection version)

== See also ==
- Tatra (company)
