= Wavelight =

Pace-setting technology used in running

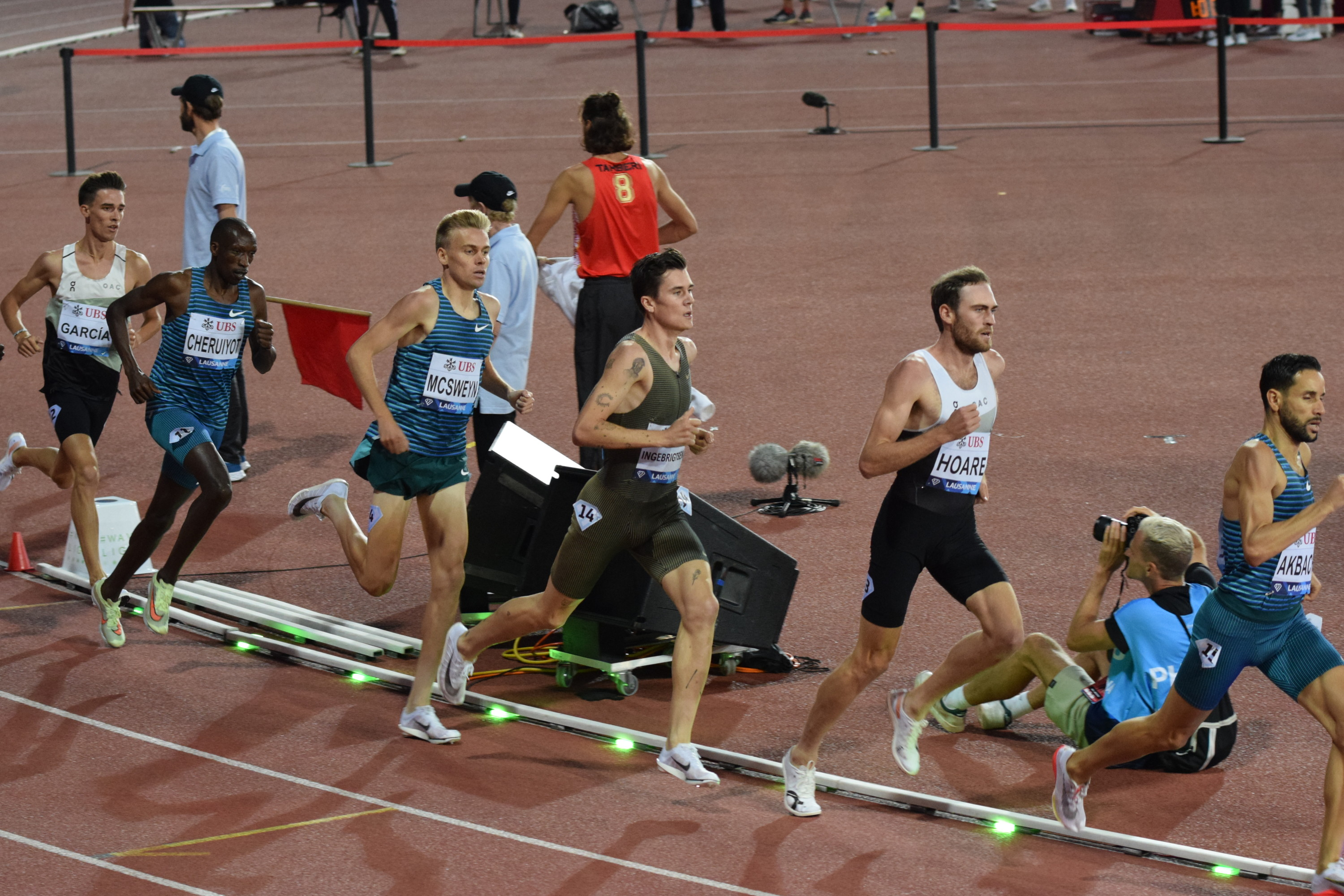
Green wavelight during the men's 1500 metres at 2022 Athletissima

In athletics, a wavelight is a pacing light system serving as pacemakers during running sports, typically by using a series of LED lights on the inner side of a running track. The original wavelight is developed by Wavelight Technologies, a company from Arnhem, Netherlands. It has been allowed for use in competition by World Athletics since 2020, citing benefits to pacing and the spectator experience. Standalone variants are also available for personal, recreational, and amateur use.

In professional middle and long distance races on the Diamond League circuit, wavelights have been used as benchmarks for athletes to break specific records. In 2020, Joshua Cheptegei used the technology to break the 5000 m and 10000 m (3.1 and 6.2 mi) world records.

In 2025, it was first used at a championship during the 2025 European Athletics Indoor Championships.
