= Tatra 623 =

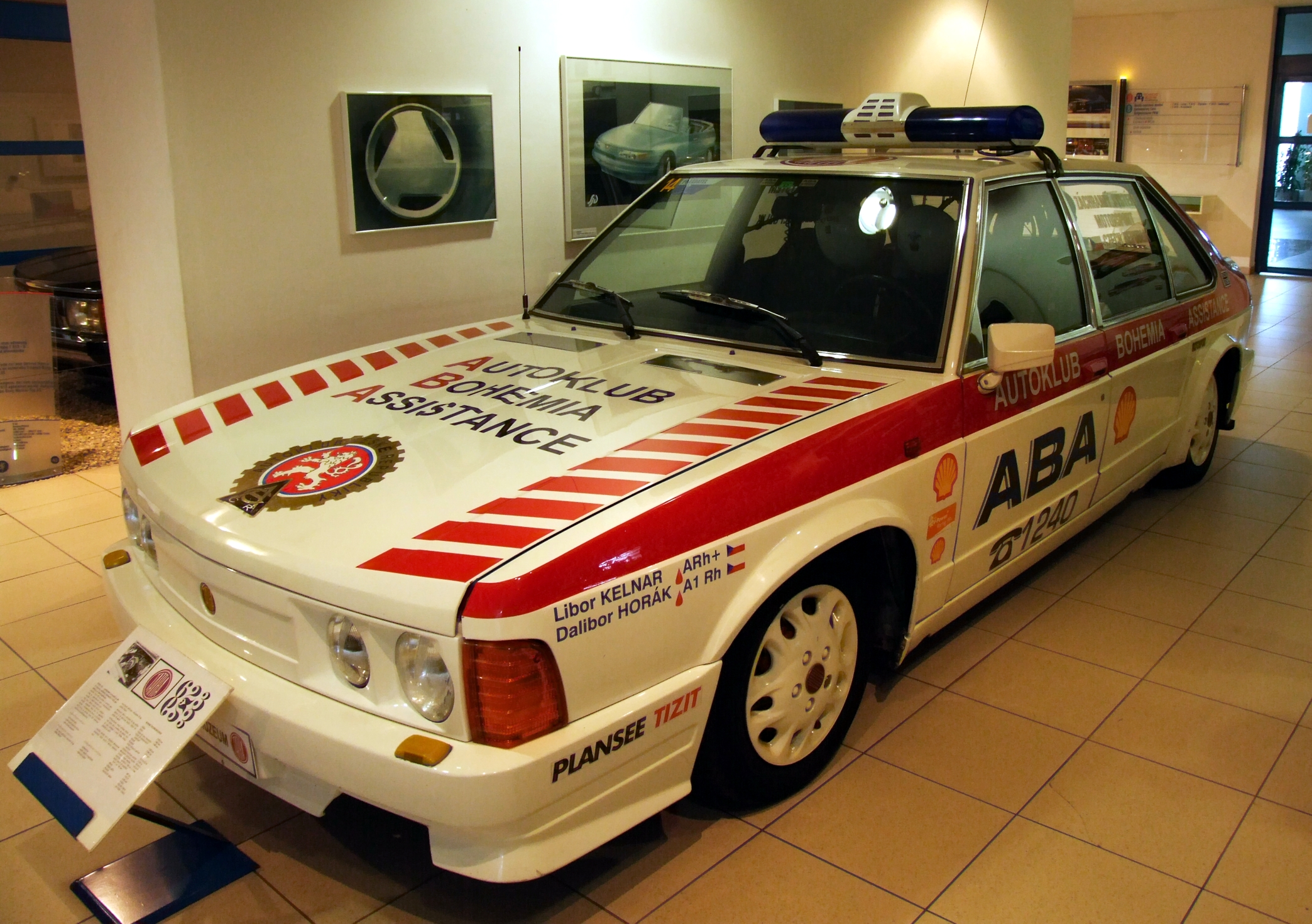

Overview
- Manufacturer: TATRA, a. s.
- Production: 1980–1998
- Assembly: Czechoslovakia/Czech Republic: Příbor, Moravia

Body and chassis
- Class: Full-size car
- Body style: 4-door sedan

Powertrain
- Engine: 3.5 L V8 (T623); 3.8 L V8 (T623 R)

Dimensions
- Length: 5,057 mm (199.1 in)
- Width: 1,800 mm (70.9 in)
- Height: 1,505 mm (59.3 in)

Chronology
- Predecessor: Tatra 613

The T-623 is a Czech rear-engined car, which was manufactured by Tatra. It was designed as a rapid response vehicle for use in motorsport and civilian operations.

The car was based on second-hand Tatra 613-2 model, which was originally modified by AMK Narex (since 1992 Narimex) who specialized in rescue operations. This business had been set up by former racer, Cyril Svoboda, who was notorious for having adapted a Lancia Beta for rescue duties.

In 1984, AMK Narex had produced six T-623. The success of the T-623 resulted in Tatra carrying out further modifications, in collaboration with Narex and Kovoslužba rescue organizations.

Because of the need of organizers for a car capable of keeping up with F1 cars on the opening race, the then T-623 was further developed into the 2-seat, lightweight and more powerful T-623 R. It led to a fleet of eight cars being used in Formula One as the safety cars at the inaugural 1986 Hungarian Grand Prix. The latest Hungarian Grand Prix that T-623 R took part in was held in 1995, where Taki Inoue was hit by the car.

The car now featured a 3.8-Litre V8 engine producing over 300 hp (220 kW), and was capable of a top speed of 250 km/h (155 mph). Its features included: a removable steering wheel and racing seats; adjustable and lowered suspension; upgraded braking system and tyres. Its aluminum fenders, hood, and doors, plus plexiglass windows, contributed to a kerb weight of 1,270 kg (2,800 lb) or a significant weight reduction of 350 kg (771 lbs).

The rescue cars were eventually replaced mostly by modified Škoda Octavia models. Nevertheless, the T-623 went on to form the basis of the Czech first super-sports car, the MTX Tatra V8.

== See also ==
- List of Czech cars
