= Pacing strategies in track and field =

Pacing strategies in track and field are the varied strategies which runners use to distribute their energy throughout a race. Optimal strategies exist and have been studied for the different events of track and field. These optimal strategies differ for runners in sprint events, such as the 100 meters, runners in middle-distance events, such as the 800 meters or the mile run, and runners in long-distance events, such as the 5000m or marathon. Additionally, pacing typically differs between different styles of races. For instance, in a time trial, where the goal of a racer is simply to run the fastest time, participants will typically employ the aforementioned optimal pacing strategy. However, in a championship race, where the goal of the racer is to win, the pace is typically slow in the beginning of the race and gradually speeds up for a sprint finish, often meaning the race is run with a negative split. Typically, to run a world record, the runner must employ a near-optimal pacing strategy.

== Strategies ==
Track and field racers have a variety of options in the ways they can choose to pace their races.

=== Even-split ===
Even-splitting is a strategy in which the racer attempts to hit the same split in every lap of the race. The racer tries to run an "even" pace during the entire race. In long-distance events, this can often be an optimal strategy.

=== Positive-split ===
Positive-splitting is a racing strategy that involves completing the first half of a race faster than the second half. Typically, the runner goes out at a pace faster than he or she can maintain for the entire race, leading to a slower end of the race. Positive-splitting can be employed as a tactic, or can simply be a byproduct of an overambitious early pace.

=== Negative-split ===
Negative-splitting is a racing strategy that involves completing the second half of a race faster than the first half. The racer runs slow in the beginning, and gradually runs faster as the race progresses. This is typically seen as a conservative racing strategy, but in distance events, many world records have been set with a slight negative split.

=== Sit-and-kick ===
Sit-and-kick, a related strategy to negative-splitting, is one in which the racer typically sits in the pack of the race, not taking the lead or going very fast, and then attempts to "kick" or sprint by the other racers during the last laps of the race. The sit-and-kick can be employed by individual runners or, in the case of many championship races, the entire field may attempt to sit-and-kick, thus leading to drastically slow times for the first few laps and faster than normal times for the last laps.

== Optimal pacing ==
While all of the above strategies can be employed, certain pacing strategies, for physiological reasons, will yield the fastest times.

=== Sprint events ===
For the 100m and 200m events, pacing is not a factor. Because the race is so short, racers simply run at their top speed for the duration of the race. However, for the 400m at the elite level, the event is almost uniformly run with a positive-split strategy. Runners run the first 200m faster than the final 200m.

=== Middle-distance events ===
In the 800 meters, the fastest times have almost always been achieved with a positive-split strategy. A study of 26 world-record 800m races from 1912 to 1997 showed that in 92% of the fastest 800m races, the first half of the race has been run faster than the second half. This implies that the optimal strategy for the 800m is a positive-split.

In the 400 meters, the strategy proven to be the most effective is starting off at a 70-75% pace and working up to 100%, or known as the threshold pace strategy. Examples of this race plan are Michael Johnson’s former World Record of 43.18 in 1999 and Cathy Freeman’s Olympic Gold Medal in 2000, both 400 meters runners who benefited from this type of pacing strategy.

=== Long-distance events ===
In the 5000 meters and 10000 meters, the optimal strategy shifts to even-splitting. An analysis of world-record performances in these events shows a clear pattern: relatively even pacing throughout most of the race, and a slight increase in speed in the last 1000m of both the 5000m and 10000m. While one could interpret this concluding increase in speed as evidence of a sit-and-kick strategy, the increase in speed observed in these performances is not nearly as dramatic and pronounced as what is typically observed in a sit-and-kick type race.
