= Kick (running) =

Ability of some athletes to sprint at the end of an endurance race

A kick in a running race is the ability of some athletes to sprint at the end of an endurance-oriented race. For those who possess the ability to kick, it is a strategic weapon. For those with the liability not to possess a kick, they must seek different strategies to anticipate and diminish their opponent's kicking power, usually by a long extended surge to break away or exhaust their opponent well ahead of the finish of the race. Similar to a sprinter in cycling, a kicker has a finite distance they know they are able to sprint, making their strategy to be in the ideal position at that distance to be able to utilize that speed. Sprinting too early could lead an athlete to tie up, a form of muscle cramp that debilitates a racer from continuing to kick. Thus team tactics might also intentionally or not, box a kicker, meaning to position other competitors to their outside, to disrupt their positioning and timing. Of course, as the finish is nearing and all athletes are straining, this becomes more difficult to accomplish deliberately.

In the 800 metres, some athletes develop the reputation for being a kicker because of their apparent speed at the end of the race, when in reality they ran even splits. Most of that speed is relative to the exhaustion as their opponents slow. Dave Wottle, James Robinson, Yuriy Borzakovskiy, Nick Symmonds and Amel Tuka would take the beginning of the race out slowly, regaining contact with the rest of the field near the last 200 metres. At the elite men's level, that even pace would be about 26 seconds per 200 metres; a 52-second first lap, as compared with the leaders close to or under 50 seconds. World record holder David Rudisha burned off the kickers during his world record during the 2012 Olympic 800m finals. When he won the 2015 World Championships, he blew away even-paced kickers like Tuka with a remarkably fast final 24.34 200 metre true kick of his own.

Generally, most long kickers or extended kickers would accelerate in the penultimate lap or shortly after the bell indicating the last lap has begun. A speed kicker would behave more like an anchor runner in a 4x400 relay, positioning themselves on the shoulder of their opponent and using their burst of speed as late as the final straightaway.

Mo Farah developed a reputation as a strategic runner. His finishing kick was not so much a burst of speed, but his extended ability to repeatedly accelerate just enough to discourage anybody from passing him during an intense final lap or so of his races. His Nike Oregon Project teammate Matthew Centrowitz Jr. employed a similar form of holding the lead to win his 2016 gold medal in the 1500.

Because of the advantage of having the tool of a kick in a competitor's arsenal, the techniques to train to kick are a common discussion among runners and coaches.

== Notable kickers ==
- Geordie Beamish
- Fermín Cacho
- Sebastian Coe
- Eamonn Coghlan
- Alberto Cova
- Haile Gebrselassie
- Cole Hocker
- Shelby Houlihan
- Ezekiel Kemboi
- Bernard Lagat
- Douglas Lowe
- Billy Mills
- Steve Ovett
- Jim Ryun
- Peter Snell
- Nick Symmonds
- Miruts Yifter
- Makayla Paige

== Extended kickers ==
- Kenenisa Bekele
- Matthew Centrowitz Jr.
- Steve Cram
- Hicham El Guerrouj
- Mo Farah
- Lasse Virén
