= 1959 USA Outdoor Track and Field Championships =

National athletics championship event

- Dates: 19–20 June (men); 27-28 June (women)
- Host city: Boulder, Colorado (men); Cleveland, Ohio (women)
- Venue: Folsom Field (men); John Adams Field (women)
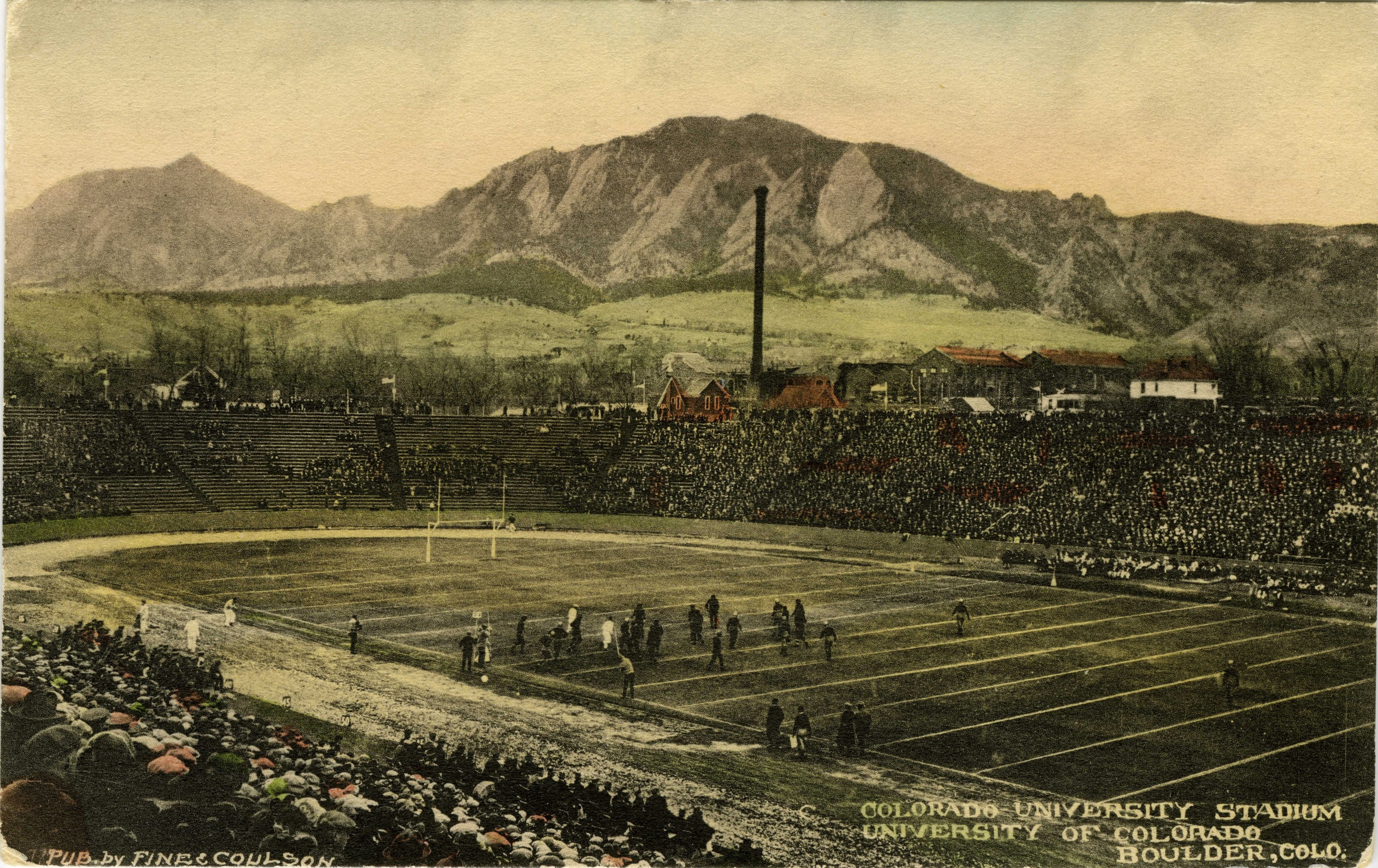

The 1959 USA Outdoor Track and Field Championships were organized by the Amateur Athletic Union (AAU) and served as the national championships in outdoor track and field for the United States.

The men's edition was held at Folsom Field in Boulder, Colorado, and it took place 19–20 June. The women's meet was held separately at John Adams Field in Cleveland, Ohio, on 27-28 June.

The men's championships were held at high altitude, and about 8,000 spectators attended the final day. Charlie Tidwell ran the world record for 220 yards hurdles around a turn. The women's meet served as the qualifiers for athletics at the 1959 Pan American Games. It was the only time the 60 metres, often held indoors today, was held at the USA Outdoor Championships.

== Results ==
=== Men ===
Event	Gold		Silver		Bronze	
100 m	Ray Norton	10.5	Robert Poynter	10.5	William Woodhouse	10.6
200 m	Ray Norton	20.8	Vance Robinson	21.0	Lester Carney	21.2
400 m	Edward Southern	46.1	Dave Mills (CAN)	46.4	Jack Yerman	46.6
800 m	Tom Murphy	1:47.9	Jerome Walters	1:48.5	Ernest Cunliffe	1:50.0
1500 m	Dyrol Burleson	3:47.5	Jim Grelle	3:48.4	Ed Moran	3:48.9
5000 m	William Dellinger	14:47.6	Lew Stieglitz	14:48.8	Max Truex	14:50.2
10000 m	Max Truex	31:22.4	Allan Lawrence (AUS)	31:35.5	Bob Soth	32:12.6
Marathon	John J. Kelley	2:21:54.4	James Green	2:29:51.0	Anthony Sapienza	2:36:14.0
110 m hurdles	Lee Calhoun	14.0	Hayes Jones	14.0	Elias Gilbert	14.1
200 m hurdles	Charles Tidwell	22.6				
400 m hurdles	Dick Howard	50.7	Glenn Davis	50.9	Joshua Culbreath	51.7
3000 m steeplechase	Philip Coleman	9:19.3	George Young	9:36.7	Charles Jones	9:38.5
3000 m walk	Eliott Denman	13:52.2				
High jump	Charles Dumas	2.06 m	Errol Williams	2.00 m	Robert Gardner	2.00 m
Pole vault	Donald Bragg	4.65 m	Ron Morris	4.65 m	Jim Graham	4.65 m
Long jump	Gregory Bell	7.95 m	Joel Wiley	7.91 m	Irvin Roberson	7.78 m
Triple jump	Ira Davis	15.40 m	Herman Stokes	15.31 m	Bill Sharpe	15.21 m
Shot put	Parry O'Brien	18.95 m	Dave Davis	18.41 m	Dallas Long	18.32 m
Discus throw	Alfred Oerter	56.82 m	Parry O'Brien	55.10 m	Richard Cochran	55.07 m
Hammer throw	Hal Connolly	66.09 m	John Lawlor (IRL)	63.56 m	Robert Backus	60.12 m
Javelin throw	Albert Cantello	75.21 m	Buster Quist	72.59 m	Philip Conley	71.88 m
Weight throw for distance	Bob Backus	44 ft 3 1/2 in (13.5 m)				
Pentathlon	Dixon Farmer	3196 pts				
All-around decathlon	Tom Pagani	7874 pts				
Decathlon	Chuan-Kwang Yang (TWN)	7549 pts	David Edstrom	7544 pts	Mike Herman	6760 pts

=== Women ===
Event	Gold		Silver		Bronze	
60 m	Isabell Daniels	7.6	Barbara Jones	7.6	Martha Hudson	7.6
100 m	Wilma Rudolph	12.1	Lucinda Williams	12.1	Barbara Jones	12.3
200 m	Isabell Daniels	24.1	Lucinda Williams	24.4	Wilma Rudolph	24.4
400 m	Kim Polson	59.0	Rose Lovelace	59.3	Isabelle Gonzalez	59.7
800 m	Grace Butcher	2:21.2	Lillian Greene	2:23.0	Florence McArdle	2:24.3
80 m hurdles	Shirley Crowder	11.7	Barbara Mueller	11.7	JoAnn Terry	11.8
High jump	Liz Josefsen (DEN)	1.62 m	Ann Roniger	1.60 m	Rose Robinson	1.57 m
Long jump	Margaret Matthews	5.90 m	Anna Lois Smith	5.83 m	Willye White	5.73 m
Shot put	Earlene Brown	14.14 m	Sharon Shepherd	12.89 m	Wanda Wejzgrowicz	12.19 m
Discus throw	Earlene Brown	46.84 m	Pamela Kurrell	41.49 m	Marie Depree (CAN)	41.02 m
Javelin throw	Marjorie Larney	46.57 m	Amelia Wershoven	46.23 m	Elsa Backus (FIN)	41.81 m
Women's pentathlon	Ann Roniger	4075 pts	Barbara Mueller	3996 pts	Liz Josefsen (DEN)	3680 pts

== See also ==
- List of USA Outdoor Track and Field Championships winners (men)
- List of USA Outdoor Track and Field Championships winners (women)
