= 1960 USA Outdoor Track and Field Championships =

National athletics championship event

- Dates: 24–25 June (men); 8–9 July (women); 5 August (pentathlon)
- Host city: Bakersfield, California (men); Corpus Christi, Texas (women); Emporia, Kansas (pentathlon)
- Venue: Memorial Stadium (men); Buccaneer Stadium (women)
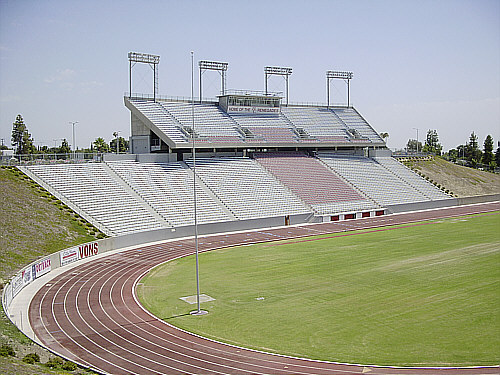

The 1960 USA Outdoor Track and Field Championships were organized by the Amateur Athletic Union (AAU) and served as the national championships in outdoor track and field for the United States.

The men's edition was held at Memorial Stadium in Bakersfield, California, and it took place 24–25 June. The women's meet was held separately at the Buccaneer Stadium in Corpus Christi, Texas, on 8–9 July, and the women's pentathlon was held on 5 August in Emporia, Kansas.

Both the men's and women's editions were held just one week before their respective 1960 United States Olympic trials. At the men's championships, John Thomas set a world record in the high jump. In the women's competitions, Jo Ann Terry broke Barbara Mueller's American pentathlon record.

== Results ==
=== Men ===
Event	Gold		Silver		Bronze	
100 m	Ray Norton	10.5	Paul Winder	10.6	William Woodhouse	10.7
200 m	Ray Norton	20.8	Lester Carney	21.0	Ed Collymore	21.1
400 m	Otis Davis	45.8	Dave Mills (CAN)	46.2	Willie Williams	46.3
800 m	Jim Cerveny	1:48.4	Lew Merriman	1:48.7	Tom Murphy	1:48.7
1500 m	Jim Grelle	3:42.7	Laszlo Tabori (HUN)	3:43.5	Ed Moran	3:43.7
5000 m	William Dellinger	14:26.4	Jim Beatty	14:26.4	Pat Clohessy (AUS)	14:33.4
10000 m	Allan Lawrence (AUS)	30:11.4	Douglas Kyle (CAN)	30:12.6	Max Truex	30:16.3
Marathon	John J. Kelley	2:20:13.6	Gordon McKenzie	2:23:46.0	Alex Breckenridge	2:32:41.0
110 m hurdles	Hayes Jones	13.6	Lee Calhoun	13.6	Willie May	13.9
200 m hurdles	Dick Howard	23.3				
400 m hurdles	Glenn Davis	50.1	Dick Howard	50.3	Joshua Culbreath	51.1
3000 m steeplechase	Philip Coleman	8:55.6	Charles(Deacon) Jones	8:55.6	Tom Oakley	9:03.7
3000 m walk	Rudy Haluza	13:22.1				
High jump	John Thomas	2.18 m	Joseph Faust	2.08 m	Errol Williams	2.08 m
Pole vault	Aubrey Dooley	4.59 m	John Cramer	4.59 m	Mel Schwarz	4.59 m
Long jump	Henk Visser (NED)	7.67 m	Joel Wiley	7.55 m	Anthony Watson	7.51 m
Triple jump	Ira Davis	16.26 m	Kent Floerke	16.11 m	Bill Sharpe	15.64 m
Shot put	Parry O'Brien	19.05 m	William Nieder	19.05 m	Dave Davis	18.96 m
Discus throw	Alfred Oerter	59.07 m	Richard Cochran	57.55 m	Rink Babka	56.51 m
Hammer throw	Hal Connolly	68.39 m	Albert Hall	65.29 m	John Lawlor (IRL)	65.17 m
Javelin throw	Albert Cantello	82.83 m	William Alley	79.00 m	Philip Conley	73.05 m
Pentathlon	Bill Toomey	3010 pts				
All-around decathlon	Charles Stevenson	7555 pts				
Decathlon	Rafer Johnson	8683 pts	Chuan-Kwang Yang (TWN)	8426 pts	Philip Mulkey	7652 pts

=== Women ===
Event	Gold		Silver		Bronze	
100 m	Wilma Rudolph	11.5	Barbara Jones	11.7	Martha Hudson	11.7
200 m	Wilma Rudolph	22.9	Lucinda Williams	23.4	Lacey O'Neal	23.4
400 m	Irene Robertson	57.1	Rose Lovelace	57.6	Ruth Ann Brand	59.0
800 m	Billie Pat Daniels	2:17.5	Rose Lovelace	2:18.2	Ruth Ann Brand	2:20.2
80 m hurdles	JoAnn Terry	11.4	Irene Robertson	11.5	Shirley Crowder	11.6
High jump	Liz Josefsen (DEN)	1.66 m	Neomia Rogers	1.62 m	Jean Gaertner	1.58 m
Long jump	Willye White	5.83 m	Sandra Smith	5.81 m	JoAnn Terry	5.71 m
Shot put	Earlene Brown	15.15 m	Sharon Shepherd	14.19 m	Cynthia Wyatt	12.38 m
Discus throw	Olga Connolly	48.63 m	Earlene Brown	46.42 m	Pamela Kurrell	44.60 m
Javelin throw	Marjorie Larney	46.29 m	Karen Mendyka	45.86 m	Peggy Scholler	45.07 m
Women's pentathlon	JoAnn Terry	4249 pts	Billie Pat Daniels	4172 pts	Shirley Crowder	4027 pts

== See also ==
- List of USA Outdoor Track and Field Championships winners (men)
- List of USA Outdoor Track and Field Championships winners (women)
