= 1984 USA Outdoor Track and Field Championships =

- Dates: June 8–9
- Host city: San Jose, California, United States
- Venue: Jaguar Stadium San Jose City College

The 1984 USA Outdoor Track and Field Championships took place between June 8–9 at Jaguar Stadium on the campus of San Jose City College in San Jose, California. The meet was organized by The Athletics Congress.

This meet was separate from the 1984 Olympic Trials, held in the Los Angeles Memorial Coliseum a week later. Among the notable events at this meet were Leslie Maxie's youth world best in the 400 metres hurdles that lasted more than 30 years. Also, then 47 year old Al Oerter was at this meet making one last attempt to get to the Olympics, 16 years after the end of his 4 successive gold medal streak in the discus. His hopes ended here when he was injured stepping into a crater left by a hammer during the preliminary round. Local rivals John Powell and Mac Wilkins instead threw their season bests at this meet before going on to the silver (Wilkins) and bronze (Powell) medals at the Olympics in Los Angeles.

== Results ==
=== Men track events ===
Event	Gold		Silver		Bronze	
100 meters (-0.4 m/s)	Sam Graddy	10.28	Emmit King	10.34	Mel Lattany	10.35
200 meters (+3.7 m/s)	Brady Crain	20.09w	Thomas Jefferson	20.26w	Larry Myricks	20.34w
400 meters	Mark Rowe	45.34	Walter McCoy	45.37	Bill Green	45.72
800 meters	James Robinson	1:47.46	Don Paige	1:48.09	Brian Theriot	1:48.38
1500 meters	Jim Spivey	3:40.54	Tim Hacker	3:41.77	Ross Donoghue	3:41.93
5000 meters	Sydney Maree	13:51.31	Steve Plasencia	13:51.44	Bill Krohn	13:51.44
10,000 meters	Jon Sinclair	28:42.54	Mark Stickley	28:45.97	Frank Shorter	29:03.40
110 meters hurdles	Tonie Campbell	13.37	Roger Kingdom	13.49	Henry Andrade	13.59
400 meters hurdles	David Patrick	49.08	Ray Smith	49.76	Lee McKenzie	49.85
3000 meters steeplechase	Henry Marsh	8:26.7	Bret Hyde	8:30.0	Tom Stevens	8:30.5
20 kilometres race walk	Ray Funkhouser	31:47.1	Gary Morgan	33:39.8	Ed Bouldin	38:03.1

=== Men field events ===
Event	Gold		Silver		Bronze	
High jump	Jimmy Howard	7 ft 7 1/4 in (2.31 m) CR	Jerome Carter	7 ft 5 1/4 in (2.26 m)	John Morris	7 ft 5 1/4 in (2.26 m)
Pole vault	Earl Bell	19 ft 0 1/4 in (5.79 m) AR, CR	Doug Lytle	18 ft 6 1/2 in (5.65 m)	Billy Olson	18 ft 0 1/2 in (5.49 m)
Long jump	Mike McRae	27 ft 1 3/4 in (8.27 m)	Mike Powell	26 ft 8 1/4 in (8.13 m)w	Ed Tave	26 ft 5 in (8.05 m)w
Triple jump	Al Joyner	55 ft 6 1/4 in (16.92 m)	Ray Kimble	55 ft 6 1/4 in (16.92 m)w	Mike Marlow	54 ft 5 1/2 in (16.59 m)w
Shot put	August Wolf	70 ft 5 3/4 in (21.48 m)	Brian Oldfield	69 ft 5 1/4 in (21.16 m)	Mike Lehmann	68 ft 2 1/4 in (20.78 m)
Discus throw	John Powell	233 ft 9 in (71.24 m) CR	Mac Wilkins	231 ft 1 in (70.43 m)	Art Burns	224 ft 6 in (68.42 m)
Hammer throw	Jud Logan	240 ft 6 in (73.3 m)	Bill Green	235 ft 11 in (71.9 m)	John McArdle	231 ft 5 in (70.53 m)
Javelin throw	Curt Ransford	276 ft 11 in (84.4 m)	Rod Ewaliko	276 ft 0 in (84.12 m)	Tom Jadwin	270 ft 9 in (82.52 m)
Decathlon	John Crist	8102	Tim Bright	8098	Jim Wooding	8072

=== Women track events ===
Event	Gold		Silver		Bronze	
100 meters	Merlene Ottey Jamaica; Alice Brown	11.12; 11.14	Diane Williams	11.42	Wendy Vereen	11.54
200 meters	Merlene Ottey Jamaica; Grace Jackson Jamaica; Pam Marshall	22.20; 22.33; 22.67	Diane Williams	23.08	Lori Smith	23.14
400 meters	Valerie Brisco-Hooks	49.83	Lillie Leatherwood	51.45	Florence Griffith	51.56
800 meters	Kim Gallagher	1.59.87	Ruth Wysocki	2.01.54	Doriane Lambelet	2.05.68
1500 meters	Kim Gallagher	4.08.08	Francie Larrieu	4.09.74	Cindy Bremser	4.09.94
3000 meters	Janice Merrill	9.01.31	Shelly Steely	9.07.56	Suzanne Girard	9.17.22
5000 meters	Katie Ishmael	16:07.5	Nan Davis	16:08.4	Glenys QuickNew Zealand; Martha Cooksey	16:11.5; 16:14.8
10,000 meters	Bonnie Sons	35.03.36				
10,000 m walk	Debbi Lawrence	51:00.3				
Marathon	Katy Schilly-Laetsch	2.32.40	Gail Kingma	2.34.09	Monica Joyce Ireland; Janis Klecker	2.34.49; 2.37.18
100 meters hurdles	Stephanie Hightower	12.99	Benita Fitzgerald	13.12	Candy Young	13.14
400 meters hurdles	Judi Brown	54.99	Leslie Maxie	55.2	Angela Wright	56.24

=== Women field events ===
Event	Gold		Silver		Bronze	
High Jump	Pam Spencer	1.93 m (6 ft 3 3/4 in)	Louise Ritter	1.90 m (6 ft 2 3/4 in)	Katrena Johnson	1.87 m (6 ft 1 1/2 in)
Long Jump	Shonel Ferguson Bahamas; Jodi Anderson	6.71 m (22 ft 0 in); 6.56 m (21 ft 6 1/4 in)	Jackie Joyner	6.52 m (21 ft 4 1/2 in)	Sabrina Douglas	6.43 m (21 ft 1 in)
Shot Put	Ria Stalman Netherlands; Lorna Griffin	18.02 m (59 ft 1 1/4 in); 17.76 m (58 ft 3 in)	Regina Cavanaugh	16.79 m (55 ft 1 in)	Elaine Sobansky	16.20 m (53 ft 1 3/4 in)
Discus Throw	Ria Stalman Netherlands; Carol Cady	67.59 m (221 ft 9 in); 62.86 m (206 ft 2 3/4 in)	Kathy Picknell	59.21 m (194 ft 3 in)	Julie Hansen	55.62 m (182 ft 5 3/4 in)
Javelin throw	Karin Smith	60.63 m (198 ft 11 in)	Lynda Sutfin	58.49 m (191 ft 10 3/4 in)	Kathy Schmidt	56.84 m (186 ft 5 3/4 in)
Heptathlon	Cindy Greiner	6154	Jodi Anderson	5992	Debra Larsen	5856

== See also ==
- United States Olympic Trials (track and field)
