= 1958 USA Outdoor Track and Field Championships =

National athletics championship event

- Dates: 20–21 June (men); 4-5 July (women)
- Host city: Bakersfield, California (men); Morristown, New Jersey (women)
- Venue: Memorial Stadium (men); Memorial Field (women)
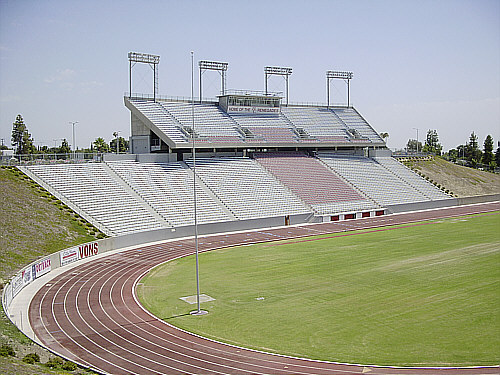

The 1958 USA Outdoor Track and Field Championships were organized by the Amateur Athletic Union (AAU) and served as the national championships in outdoor track and field for the United States.

The men's edition was held at Memorial Stadium in Bakersfield, California, and it took place 20–21 June. The women's meet was held separately at Memorial Field in Morristown, New Jersey, on 4–5 July.

The 1958 men's championships were considered one of the most successful in meet history, with 10,000 spectators on the final day. World records were set by Glenn Davis in the 440 yards hurdles and Hal Connolly in the hammer throw. The women's competition served as a qualifier for the 1958 USA–USSR Track and Field Dual Meet. The baseball throw event was eliminated and the 440 yards was added for the first time. Lillian Greene initially won the 880 yards in 2:26.4, but she was later disqualified for having a teammate pace her on the infield for the final 220 yards. Greene was nevertheless selected to represent the U.S. at the USSR dual meet.

== Results ==
=== Men ===
Event	Gold		Silver		Bronze	
100 yards	Bobby Morrow	9.4	Ira Murchison	9.4	Willie White	9.6
220 yards	Bobby Morrow	20.9	Glenn Davis	21.1	James Paul Segrest	21.1
440 yards	Edward Southern	45.8	Charles Jenkins Sr.	46.1	Jack Yerman	46.6
880 yards	Thomas Courtney	1:49.2	Mike Peake	1:50.4	Tom Murphy	1:50.5
1 mile	Herbert Elliott (AUS)	3:57.9	Mervyn Lincoln (AUS)	3:58.5	Ed Moran	4:01.7
3 miles	Alex Henderson (AUS)	13:37.1	Laszlo Tabori (HUN)	13:38.9	William Dellinger	13:40.9
6 miles	John Macy	29:25.6	Gordon McKenzie	29:31.7	Jerry Smart	29:45.2
Marathon	John J. Kelley	2:21:00.4	Alfred Confalone	2:32:06.0	Theodore Corbitt	2:35:44.0
120 yards hurdles	Hayes Jones	13.8	Ancel Robinson	14.1	Elias Gilbert	14.3
220 yards hurdles	Francis Washington	23.1				
440 yards hurdles	Glenn Davis	49.9	Joshua Culbreath	50.6	Willie Atterberry	51.0
3000 m steeplechase	Charles Jones	8:57.2	Philip Coleman	9:09.3	Tod White	9:20.4
2 miles walk	Henry Laskau	15:07.5				
High jump	Charles Dumas	2.07 m	Paul Stuber	2.06 m	George Dennis	2.03 m
High jump	Charles Dumas	2.07 m	Paul Stuber	2.06 m	John Thomas	2.03 m
High jump	Charles Dumas	2.07 m	Paul Stuber	2.06 m	Thomas Whetstine	2.03 m
Pole vault	Ron Morris	4.49 m	Jim Brewer	4.42 m	none awarded	
Pole vault	Ron Morris	4.49 m	Earl Poucher	4.42 m	none awarded	
Pole vault	Ron Morris	4.49 m	Donald Bragg	4.42 m	none awarded	
Long jump	Ernest Shelby	7.88 m	Bill Jackson	7.62 m	Joel Wiley	7.55 m
Triple jump	Ira Davis	15.45 m	Kent Floerke	15.37 m	Herman Stokes	14.88 m
Shot put	Parry O'Brien	18.88 m	Dallas Long	18.41 m	Dave Davis	18.21 m
Discus throw	Rink Babka	57.25 m	Alfred Oerter	55.32 m	Jerome Jennings	54.56 m
Hammer throw	Hal Connolly	68.68 m	Albert Hall	66.27 m	John Lawlor (IRL)	61.57 m
Javelin throw	Bud Held	76.82 m (Note: Mark made in qualifying rounds)	Albert Cantello	74.37 m	Philip Conley	74.19 m
Weight throw for distance	Bob Backus	43 ft 2 in (13.15 m)				
Pentathlon	Howard Smith	3200 pts				
All-around decathlon	Tom Pagani	8114.5 pts				
Decathlon	Rafer Johnson	7754 pts	Chuan-Kwang Yang (TWN)	7625 pts	David Edstrom	7154 pts

=== Women ===
Event	Gold		Silver		Bronze	
50 yards	Barbara Jones	6.0	Martha Hudson		Fronnie Tucker	
100 yards	Margaret Matthews	11.1	Barbara Jones		Martha Hudson	
220 yards	Lucinda Williams	24.3	Isabell Daniels		Bertha Diaz (CUB)	
880 yards	Florence McArdle	2:26.7	Grace Butcher		Christine McKenzie	
80 m hurdles	Bertha Diaz (CUB)	11.4	Lauretta Foley		Doris McCaffey	
High jump	Rose Robinson	1.59 m	none awarded		Verneda Thomas	1.50 m
High jump	Barbara Browne	1.59 m	none awarded		Marva Mangrum	1.50 m
High jump	Barbara Browne	1.59 m	none awarded		Ann Flynn	1.50 m
High jump	Barbara Browne	1.59 m	none awarded		Neomia Rogers	1.50 m
High jump	Barbara Browne	1.59 m	none awarded		Ann Roniger	1.50 m
High jump	Barbara Browne	1.59 m	none awarded		Darlene Everhart	1.50 m
Long jump	Margaret Matthews	6.12 m	Anna Lois Smith	5.85 m	Willye White	5.76 m
Shot put	Earlene Brown	14.46 m	Sharon Shepherd	12.88 m	Wanda Wejzgrowicz	12.03 m
Discus throw	Earlene Brown	46.47 m	Marjorie Larney	41.97 m	Alejandra Herrera (CUB)	40.36 m
Javelin throw	Marjorie Larney	46.82 m	Amelia Wershoven	45.45 m	Mary Jane Snyder	39.10 m
Women's pentathlon	Ann Roniger	3762 pts	Barbara Mueller	3728 pts	Betty Scott	3398 pts

== See also ==
- List of USA Outdoor Track and Field Championships winners (men)
- List of USA Outdoor Track and Field Championships winners (women)
