= 1956 USA Outdoor Track and Field Championships =

American athletics championship event

- Dates: 22–23 June (men); 17-18 August (women); 27 October (pentathlon)
- Host city: Bakersfield, California (men); Philadelphia, Pennsylvania (women); Pasadena, California (pentathlon)
- Venue: Memorial Stadium (men); Franklin Field (women)
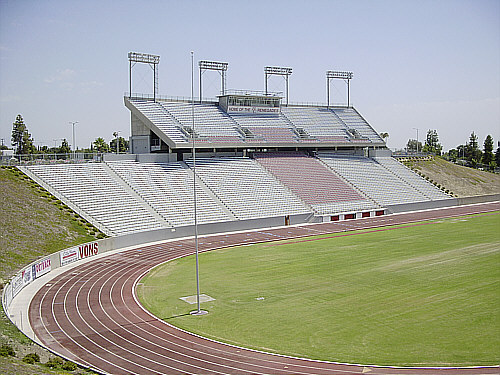

The 1956 USA Outdoor Track and Field Championships were organized by the Amateur Athletic Union (AAU) and served as the national championships in outdoor track and field for the United States.

The men's edition was held at Memorial Stadium in Bakersfield, California, and it took place 22–23 June. The women's meet was held separately at Franklin Field in Philadelphia, Pennsylvania, on 17-18 August while the pentathlon was held on 27 October in Pasadena, California.

Both the men's and women's championships were held one week before their corresponding 1956 United States Olympic trials. At the men's meet, two world records were equaled (Bobby Morrow in the 100 m heats and Thane Baker in the 200 m on a curve) and one was set outright, by Jack Davis in the 110 m hurdles. In the women's competitions, four American records were broken despite the meets taking place so far before the 1956 Olympics.

== Results ==
=== Men ===
Event	Gold		Silver		Bronze	
100 m	Bobby Morrow	10.3	Leamon King	10.45	Thane Baker	10.52
200 m	Thane Baker	20.6	Andrew Stanfield	20.63	Theodius Bush	20.93
400 m	Thomas Courtney	45.8 m	Charles Jenkins Sr.	46.5	Reggie Pearman	46.7
800 m	Arnold Sowell	1:47.6	Eugene Maynard	1:48.14	Malvin Whitfield	1:48.18
1500 m	Jerome Walters	3:48.4	Fred Dwyer	3:48.8	Joe Villareal	3:49.2
5000 m	Richard Hart	14:47.4	Mal Robertson	14:53.4	Gordon McKenzie	14:58.4
10000 m	Max Truex	30:52.0	Richard Hart	31:06.3	Gordon McKenzie	31:06.8
Marathon	John J. Kelley	2:24:52.2	Dean Thackwray	2:31:14.0	Nick Costes	2:31:52.0
110 m hurdles	Lee Calhoun	13.6	Joel Shankle	13.80	Jack Davis	13.84
200 m hurdles	Charles Pratt	22.8				
400 m hurdles	Glenn Davis	50.9	Edward Southern	51.5	Willie Atterberry	51.6
3000 m steeplechase	Horace Ashenfelter	9:04.1	William Ashenfelter	9:11.7	Philip Coleman	9:12.7
3000 m walk	Henry Laskau	13:39.0				
High jump	Charles Dumas	2.08 m	Bernard Allard	2.04 m	none awarded	
High jump	Charles Dumas	2.08 m	Donald Stewart	2.04 m	none awarded	
High jump	Charles Dumas	2.08 m	Ernest Shelton	2.04 m	none awarded	
High jump	Charles Dumas	2.08 m	Vernon Wilson	2.04 m	none awarded	
Pole vault	Bob Richards	4.57 m	Donald Bragg	4.43 m	none awarded	
Pole vault	Bob Richards	4.57 m	Fred Barnes	4.43 m	none awarded	
Long jump	Ernest Shelby	7.95 m	George Brown	7.75 m	Gregory Bell	7.71 m
Long jump	Ernest Shelby	7.95 m	George Brown	7.75 m	Malachi Andrews	7.71 m
Triple jump	Willie Hollie	15.09 m	Elles West (RSA)	15.02 m	none awarded	
Triple jump	Willie Hollie	15.09 m	Jack Smyth (CAN)	15.02 m	none awarded	
Shot put	Kenneth Bantum	18.02 m	Parry O'Brien	17.97 m	Stan Lampert	17.41 m
Discus throw	Ron Drummond	54.94 m	Fortune Gordien	54.40 m	Desmond Koch	53.06 m
Hammer throw	Hal Connolly	62.75 m	Albert Hall	62.32 m	John Morefield	59.84 m
Javelin throw	Cyrus Young	75.58 m	Leo Long	72.02 m	Benny Garcia	70.80 m
Weight throw for distance	Bob Backus	43 ft 0 in (13.1 m)				
Pentathlon	Howard Smith	3034 pts				
All-around decathlon	Charles Stevenson	7612 pts				
Decathlon	Rafer Johnson	7755 pts	Milt Campbell	7559 pts	Bob Richards	7054 pts

=== Women ===
Event	Gold		Silver		Bronze	
50 m	Isabell Daniels	6.4	Barbara Jones		Lucinda Williams	
100 m	Mae Faggs	11.7	Isabell Daniels		Charlotte Gooden (PAN)	
200 m	Mae Faggs	24.6	Wilma Rudolph		Elaine Ellis	
80 m hurdles	Bertha Diaz (CUB)	11.2	Shirley Eckel		Constance Darnowski	
High jump	Mildred McDaniel	1.62 m	Ann Flynn		none awarded	
High jump	Mildred McDaniel	1.62 m	Verneda Thomas		none awarded	
Long jump	Margaret Matthews	5.89 m	Willye White		Phyllis Logan	
Shot put	Earlene Brown	13.71 m	Jackie MacDonald (CAN)		Lois Ann Testa	
Discus throw	Pamela Kurrell	42.95 m	Jackie MacDonald (CAN)		Earlene Brown	
Javelin throw	Karen Anderson	48.49 m	Amelia Wershoven		Marjorie Larney	
Baseball throw	Pamela Kurrell	269 ft 5 1/2 in (82.13 m)				
Women's pentathlon	Barbara Mueller	4154 pts	Stanislawa Walasiewicz (POL)	3565 pts	Irene Robertson	3507 pts

== See also ==
- List of USA Outdoor Track and Field Championships winners (men)
- List of USA Outdoor Track and Field Championships winners (women)
