= 1987 USA Outdoor Track and Field Championships =

- Dates: June 26–27
- Host city: San Jose, California, United States
- Venue: Jaguar Stadium San Jose City College

The 1987 USA Outdoor Track and Field Championships took place between June 26–27 at Jaguar Stadium on the campus of San Jose City College in San Jose, California. The meet was organized by The Athletics Congress.

As recently as six years before this meet, only two individuals had ever long jumped 28 ft 0 in (8.53 m). Here, three different individuals jumped further.

== Results ==
=== Men track events ===
Event	Gold		Silver		Bronze	
100 meters (+1.8 m/s)	Mark Witherspoon	10.04	Carl Lewis	10.05	Lee McRae	10.08
200 meters (+0.4 m/s)	Carl Lewis	20.12	Wallace Spearmon	20.33	Calvin Smith	20.34
400 meters	Butch Reynolds	44.46	Roddie Haley	44.83	Antonio McKay	45.24
800 meters	Johnny Gray	1:45.15	Stanley Redwine	1:45.47	David Mack	1:46.49
1500 meters	Jim Spivey	3:43.66	Steve Scott	3:44.10	Charles Marsala	3:44.73
5000 meters	Sydney Maree	13:51.45	Doug Padilla	13:52.61	Terry Brahm	13:56.80
10,000 meters	Gerard Donakowski	28:25.10	Steve Plasencia	28:27.57	Ed Eyestone	28:28.85
110 meters hurdles (+2.8 m/s)	Greg Foster	13.15	Cletus Clark	13.28	Jack Pierce	13.29
400 meters hurdles	Edwin Moses	47.99	Danny Harris	48.7	David Patrick	48.76
3000 meters steeplechase	Henry Marsh	8:20.26	Brian Abshire	8:20.83	Brian Diemer	8:20.95
20 kilometres race walk	Tim Lewis	1:24:12	Carl Schueler	1:26:10	Ray Sharp	1:27:00

=== Men field events ===
Event	Gold		Silver		Bronze	
High jump	Jerome Carter	2.31 m (7 ft 6 3/4 in)	Lee Balkin	2.31 m (7 ft 6 3/4 in)	Thomas McCants	2.28 m (7 ft 5 3/4 in)
Pole vault	Joe Dial	5.80 m (19 ft 1/4 in) =CR	Earl Bell	5.70 m (18 ft 8 1/4 in)	Billy Olson	5.70 m (18 ft 8 1/4 in)
Long jump	Carl Lewis	8.65 m (28 ft 4 1/2 in)	Larry Myricks	8.63 m (28 ft 3 3/4 in)	Mike Conley	8.55 m (28 ft 1/2 in)w
Triple jump	Mike Conley	17.87 m (58 ft 7 1/2 in)	Willie Banks	17.60 m (57 ft 8 3/4 in)w	Charlie Simpkins	17.59 m (57 ft 8 1/2 in)w
Shot put	John Brenner	21.26 m (69 ft 9 in)	Gregg Tafralis	20.81 m (68 ft 3 1/4 in)	Garry Frank	19.84 m (65 ft 1 in)
Discus throw	John Powell	66.22 m (217 ft 3 in)	Randy Heisler	64.38 m (211 ft 2 in)	John Brenner	62.84 m (206 ft 2 in)
Hammer throw	Jud Logan	79.04 m (259 ft 3 in),CR	Bill Green	77.12 m (253 ft 0 in)	Ken Flax	76.98 m (252 ft 6 in)
Javelin throw	Duncan Atwood	82.72 m (271 ft 4 in)	Tom Petranoff	79.80 m (261 ft 9 in)	Mark Babich	79.12 m (259 ft 6 in)
Decathlon	Tim Bright	8340	Rob Muzzio	8134	Gary Kinder	8053

=== Women track events ===
Event	Gold		Silver		Bronze	
100 meters (+2.8 m/s)	Diane Williams	10.93w	Alice Brown	10.95w	Pam Marshall	10.99w
200 meters (+1.3 m/s)	Pam Marshall	21.6hw	Florence Griffith	21.7hw	Grace Jackson Jamaica; Juliet Cuthbert Jamaica; Evelyn Ashford	21.8hw 21.8hw 21.9hw
400 meters	Lillie Leatherwood	50.62	Diane Dixon	51.02	Denean Hill	51.28
800 meters	Essie Washington	1:59.07	Delisa Floyd	1:59.20	Joetta Clark-Diggs	1:59.45
1500 meters	Regina Jacobs	4:03.70	Linda Sheskey	4:05.80	Angela Chalmers Canada; Chris Pfitzinger New Zealand; Diana Richburg	4:06.43; 4:06.47; 4:07.32
3000 meters	Mary Knisely	8:57.60	Cindy Bremser	8:58.80	Leslie Seymour	9:02.64
5000 meters	Nan Davis	15:57.46	Maureen Cogan	16:08.81	Sylvia Mosqueda	16:34.50
10,000 meters	Lynn Jennings	32:19.95	Francie Larrieu Smith	32:45.43	Lynn Nelson	32:52.55
100 meters hurdles (-1.2 m/s)	LaVonna Martin-Floreal	12.80 CR	Stephanie Hightower	12.99	Sophia Hunter	13.05
400 meters hurdles	Judi Brown-King	54.45 CR	Sandra Farmer-Patrick Jamaica; LaTanya Sheffield	54.69; 55.05	Schowonda Williams	55.3
10 kilometres race walk	Maryanne Torrellas	47:23.8 AR, CR	Lynn Weik	47:36.5	Debbi Lawrence	48:30.3

=== Women field events ===
Event	Gold		Silver		Bronze	
High jump	Coleen Sommer	1.96 m (6 ft 5 in)	Louise Ritter	1.93 m (6 ft 3 3/4 in)	Phyllis Bluntson	1.93 m (6 ft 3 3/4 in)
Long jump	Jackie Joyner-Kersee	7.12 m (23 ft 4 1/4 in)	Jennifer Inniss	6.75 m (22 ft 1 1/2 in)	Sheila Echols	6.55 m (21 ft 5 3/4 in)
Triple jump	Sheila Hudson	13.85 m (45 ft 5 1/4 in) WR, AR, CR	Wendy Brown	13.51 m (44 ft 3 3/4 in)	Terri Turner-Hairston	12.98 m (42 ft 7 in)
Shot put	Ramona Pagel	18.97 m (62 ft 2 3/4 in)	Pam Dukes	18.11 m (59 ft 4 3/4 in)	Bonnie Dasse	17.96 m (58 ft 11 in)
Discus throw	Connie Price-Smith	64.76 m (212 ft 5 in)	Carol Cady	63.06 m (206 ft 10 in)	Ramona Pagel	61.92 m (203 ft 1 in)
Javelin throw	Karin Smith	62.08 m (203 ft 8 in)	Lynda Sutfin	60.04 m (196 ft 11 in)	Cathie Wilson	59.20 m (194 ft 2 in)
Heptathlon	Jackie Joyner-Kersee	6979 CR	Jane Frederick	6389	Cindy Greiner	6275

== See also ==
- United States Olympic Trials (track and field)
