= 1964 USA Outdoor Track and Field Championships =

- Dates: June 26–28
- Host city: New Brunswick, New Jersey; Hanford, California; United States
- Venue: Rutgers Stadium; Hanford Bowl

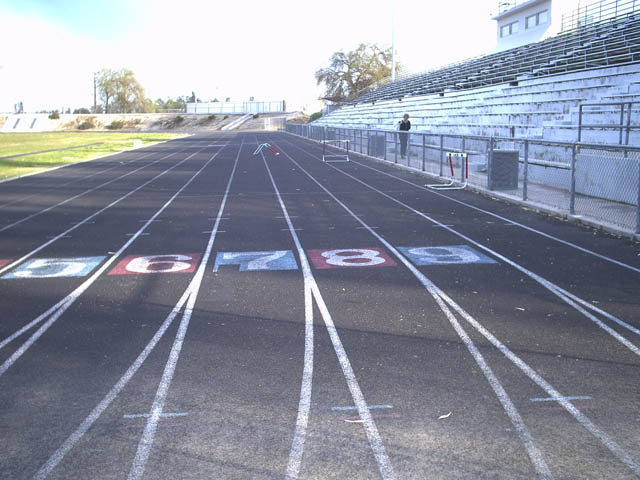
Hanford Bowl hosted the women's championships

The 1964 USA Outdoor Track and Field Championships men's competition took place between June 26–28 at Rutgers Stadium in New Brunswick, New Jersey. The women's division held their championships separately at the new Hanford Bowl in Hanford, California. The Hanford Bowl was one of the first stadiums to sport an all-weather track made of asphalt and rubber. While this meet was separate from the Olympic Trials, since 1964 was an Olympic year, events were held over metric distances.

The Marathon championships were run in October at the Yonkers Marathon.

== Results ==
=== Men track events ===
Event	Gold		Silver		Bronze	
100 meters	Robert Hayes	10.3	Charles Greene	10.4	Bernie Rivers	10.5
200 meters	Henry Carr	20.6* CRm	Paul Drayton	20.6	John Moon	20.8
400 meters	Mike Larrabee	46.0	Robert Brightwell United Kingdom; Ollan Cassell	46.0; 46.3	Adolph Plummer	46.3
800 meters	Jerry Siebert	1.47.5 CRm	Darnell Mitchell	1.47.6	Fran Smith	1.47.9
1500 meters	Tom O'Hara	3.38.1 =NR	Dyrol Burleson	3.38.8	Jim Grelle	3.38.9
5000 meters	Bob Schul	13.56.2 CRm	Gerry Lindgren	13.58.6	Jim Beatty	14.06.0
10,000 meters	Peter McArdle	30.11.0 CRm	John Gutknecht	30.44.6	Oscar Moore	30.47.4
Marathon	Leonard Edelen	2.24.25.6	Adolf Gruber Austria; John J. Kelley	2.44.11.4; 2.44.46.4	Harold Harris	2.58.28.0
110 meters hurdles	Hayes Jones	13.8	Blaine Lindgren	13.9	Russ Rogers	14.2
400 meters hurdles	Billy Hardin	50.1* CRm	Jay Luck	50.2	Willie Atterberry	50.3
3000 meters steeplechase	Jeffrey Fishback	8.43.6 CRm	George Young	8.49.4	Fred Best	8.56.8
2 miles walk	Ron Zinn	13:48.6				

=== Men field events ===
Event	Gold		Silver		Bronze	
High jump	Ed Caruthers	2.16 m (7 ft 1 in)	John Rambo	2.16 m (7 ft 1 in)	John Thomas	2.16 m (7 ft 1 in)
Pole vault	Fred Hansen	5.18 m (16 ft 11 3/4 in) CR	Dave Tork	5.08 m (16 ft 8 in)	Floyd Manning	4.99 m (16 ft 4 1/4 in)
Long jump	Ralph Boston	8.11 m (26 ft 7 1/4 in)	Charlie Mays	7.97 m (26 ft 1 3/4 in)	Darrell Horn	7.95 m (26 ft 3/4 in)
Triple jump	Chris Mousiadis Greece; Ira Davis	16.18 m (53 ft 1 in); 16.14 m (52 ft 11 1/4 in)	William Sharpe	15.82 m (51 ft 10 3/4 in)	Art Walker	15.75 m (51 ft 8 in)
Shot put	Randy Matson	19.78 m (64 ft 10 1/2 in) CR	Dallas Long	19.32 m (63 ft 4 1/2 in)	Parry O'Brien	18.88 m (61 ft 11 1/4 in)
Discus Throw	Alfred Oerter	61.30 m (201 ft 1 in)	Jay Silvester	59.07 m (193 ft 9 in)	Dave Weill	57.87 m (189 ft 10 in)
Hammer throw	Hal Connolly	69.02 m (226 ft 5 in) CR	Ed Burke	65.80 m (215 ft 10 in)	Albert Hall	63.52 m (208 ft 4 in)
Javelin throw	Frank Covelli	77.29 m (253 ft 6 in)	Jan Sikorsky	75.61 m (248 ft 0 in)	Glenn Winningham	75.07 m (246 ft 3 in)
Pentathlon	Bill Toomey	3686 pts				
All-around decathlon	Bill Urban	8177 pts				
Decathlon	Chuan-Kwang Yang Taiwan; Paul Herman	8641; 7794	Don Jeisy	7768	Russ Hodge	7729

=== Women track events ===
Event	Gold		Silver		Bronze	
100 meters	Wyomia Tyus	11.5	Edith McGuire	11.5	Rosie Bonds	11.5
200 meters	Edith McGuire	23.6	Vivian Brown	24.0	Shirley Wilson	24.0
400 meters	Janell Smith	54.7	Una Morris	54.7	Patricia Clark	56.5
800 meters	Sandra Knott	2:10.4	Leah Bennett-Ferris	2:12.7	Carol Mastronarde	2:12.9
80 meters hurdles	Rosie Bonds	10.8	Cherrie Sherrard	10.8	Tammy Davis	11.1

=== Women field events ===
Event	Gold		Silver		Bronze	
High jump	Eleanor Montgomery	1.73 m (5 ft 8 in)	Terrezene Brown	1.67 m (5 ft 5 1/2 in)	Billie Pat Daniels	1.67 m (5 ft 5 1/2 in)
Long jump	Willye White	6.58 m (21 ft 7 in)	Martha Watson	5.97 m (19 ft 7 in)	Billie Pat Daniels	5.92 m (19 ft 5 in)
Shot put	Earlene Brown	14.30 m (46 ft 10 3/4 in)	Cynthia Wyatt	13.60 m (44 ft 7 1/4 in)	Lynn Graham	13.22 m (43 ft 4 1/4 in)
Discus Throw	Olga Connolly	48.26 m (158 ft 4 in)	Earlene Brown	47.75 m (156 ft 7 in)	Sharon Shepherd	43.66 m (143 ft 2 in)
Javelin throw	RaNae Bair	52.84 m (173 ft 4 in)	Fran Davenport	47.65 m (156 ft 3 in)	Lurline Hamilton	47.20 m (154 ft 10 in)
Pentathlon	Billie Pat Daniels	4644	Sally Griffith	4254	Cherrie Sherrard	4243

== See also ==
- United States Olympic Trials (track and field)
