= 1985 USA Outdoor Track and Field Championships =

- Dates: June 15–17
- Host city: Indianapolis, Indiana, United States
- Venue: IUPUI Track and Soccer Stadium

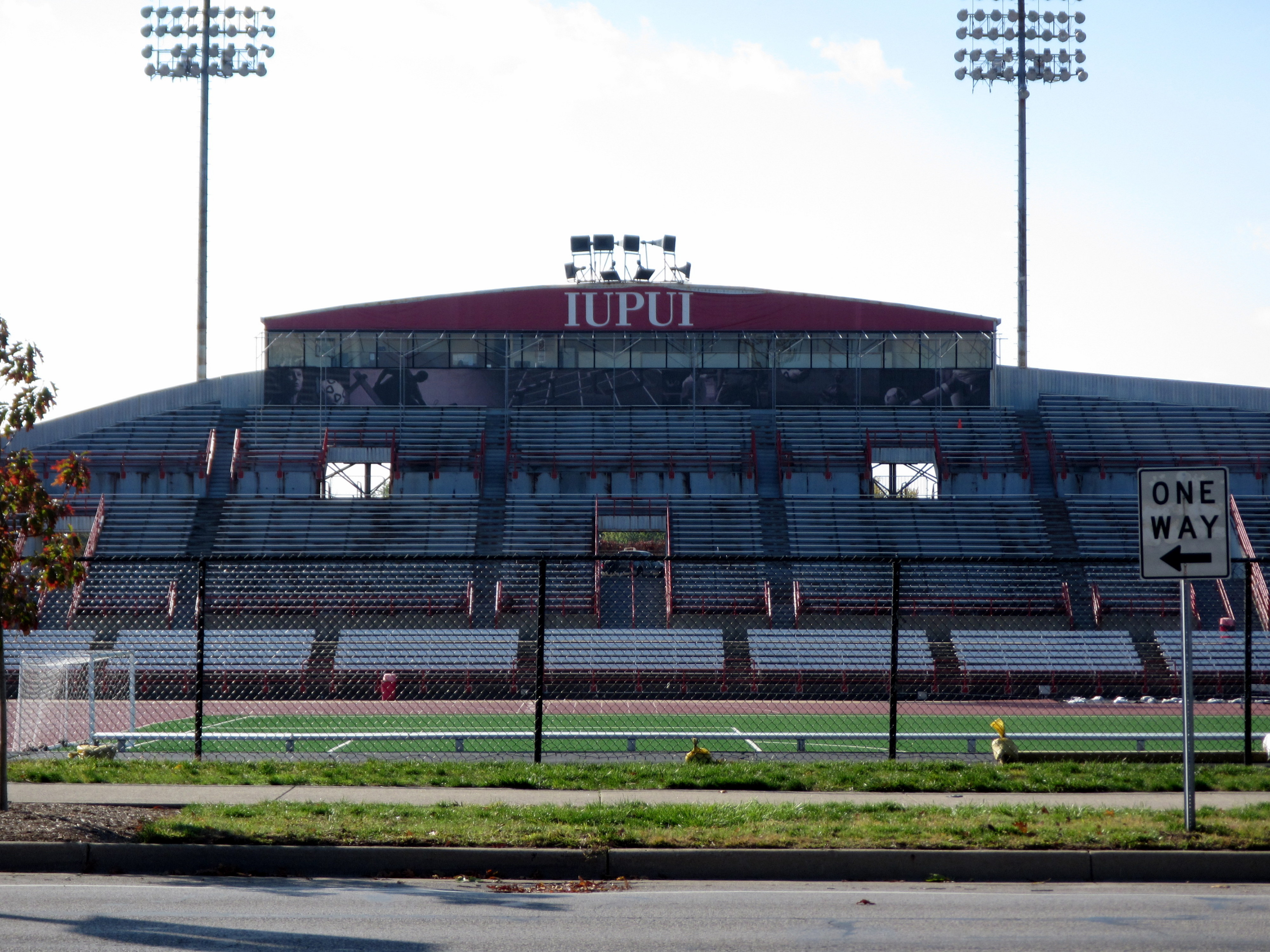

The 1985 USA Outdoor Track and Field Championships took place between June 15–17 at IUPUI Track and Soccer Stadium on the campus of Indiana University-Purdue University Indianapolis in Indianapolis, Indiana. The meet was organized by The Athletics Congress. The decathlon and heptathlon were held the two days after the main meet. Marathon National Championships were held at the California International Marathon in December.

The most notable event at this meet was Willie Banks' world record in the triple jump. The jump occurred almost by accident as the always exuberant Banks took his attempt and rushed out of the pit in order to cheer for his Athletics West teammate Louise Romo, who was finishing her 800 meters race.

== Results ==
=== Men track events ===
Event	Gold		Silver		Bronze	
100 meters (+0.0 m/s)	Kirk Baptiste	10.11	Lee McNeill	10.17	Calvin Smith	10.18
200 meters (+0.3 m/s)	Kirk Baptiste	20.11	Roy Martin	20.13	Calvin Smith	20.26
400 meters	Mark Rowe	44.87	Darrell Robinson	44.94	Roddie Haley	45.06
800 meters	Johnny Gray	1:44.01	John Marshall	1:44.53	Earl Jones	1:44.58
1500 meters	Jim Spivey	3:39.54	Steve Scott	3:39.61	Tim Hacker	3:39.63
5000 meters	Doug Padilla	13:16.42	Sydney Maree	13:17.13	Matt Centrowitz	13:33.92
10,000 meters	Bruce Bickford	28:00.10	Mark Nenow	28:12.60	Pat Porter	28:12.90
110 meters hurdles (+1.1 m/s)	Roger Kingdom	13.26	Cletus Clark	13.43	Keith Talley	13.59
400 meters hurdles	Andre Phillips	47.67	Danny Harris	48.65	Tony Rambo	49.29
3000 meters steeplechase	Henry Marsh	8:18.35	Brian Diemer	8:20.64	Farley Gerber	8:21.99
10 kilometres race walk	Tim Lewis	28:26.46	Marco Evoniuk	29:28.12	Todd Scully	30:12.16

=== Men field events ===
Event	Gold		Silver		Bronze	
High jump	Brian Stanton	7 ft 6 1/2 in (2.29 m)	Lee Balkin	7 ft 5 1/4 in (2.26 m)	Darren Burton	7 ft 5 1/4 in (2.26 m)
Pole vault	Joe Dial	18 ft 9 1/4 in (5.72 m)	Mike Tully	18 ft 5 1/4 in (5.61 m)	Billy Olson	18 ft 5 1/4 in (5.61 m)
Long jump	Mike Conley	28 ft 0 in (8.53 m)w	Jason Grimes	27 ft 10 3/4 in (8.5 m)w	Mike Powell	27 ft 2 in (8.28 m)w
Triple jump	Willie Banks	58 ft 11 1/2 in (17.97 m) WR, AR, CR	Mike Conley	58 ft 1 1/4 in (17.71 m)	Charlie Simpkins	57 ft 5 3/4 in (17.51 m)
Shot put	Dave Laut	68 ft 11 3/4 in (21.02 m)	John Brenner	68 ft 9 3/4 in (20.97 m)	Jesse Stuart	68 ft 1 in (20.75 m)
Discus throw	John Powell	214 ft 4 in (65.32 m)	Art Burns	211 ft 10 in (64.56 m)	Judd Binley	210 ft 3 in (64.08 m)
Hammer throw	Jud Logan	250 ft 2 in (76.25 m)	Dave McKenzie	232 ft 4 in (70.81 m)	Ken Flax	230 ft 3 in (70.18 m)
Javelin throw	Tom Petranoff	286 ft 1 in (87.19 m)	Tom Jadwin	284 ft 6 in (86.71 m)	Duncan Atwood	276 ft 10 in (84.37 m)
Decathlon	John Sayre	8381w	Mike Ramos	8156w	Tim Bright	8068

=== Women track events ===
Event	Gold		Silver		Bronze	
100 meters	Merlene Ottey-Page (Jamaica)	10.98	Pam Marshall	11.21	Diane Williams	11.23
200 meters	Merlene Ottey-Page (Jamaica)	21.93	Pam Marshall	22.39	Grace Jackson (Jamaica)	22.57
400 meters	Lillie Leatherwood	50.64	Diane Dixon	50.79	Ilrey Oliver (Jamaica)	51.96
800 meters	Claudette Groenendaal	1:59.48	Louise Romo	1:59.63	Delisa Walton	2:00.17
1500 meters	Diana Richburg	4:04.73	Darlene Beckford	4.06.46	Ruth Wysocki	4.07.42
3000 meters	Cathy Branta	8:49.64	Cindy Bremser	8.49.6	Mary Knisely	8.52.54
5000 meters	Suzanne Girard	15:57.50	Jan Merrill	15:57.83	Annie Schweitzer	15:58.39
10,000 meters	Francie Larrieu Smith	32:18.29	Kirsten O'Hara	32:40.76	Lynn Jennings	32:48.88
Marathon	Nancy Ditz	2:31:36	Janis Klecker	2:31:53	Maureen Roben	2:34:17
100 meters hurdles	Rhonda Blanford	12.85	Stephanie Hightower	12.92	Benita Fitzgerald-Brown	13.04
400 meters hurdles	Judi Brown-King	55.10	LaTanya Sheffield	55.53	Tonia Brown	56.34
10K racewalk	Maryanne Torrellas	48:38.16	Teresa Vaill	49:25.43	Debbi Lawrence	50:25.43

=== Women field events ===
Event	Gold		Silver		Bronze	
High jump	Louis Ritter	1.91 m (6 ft 3 in)	Coleen Sommer	1.91 m (6 ft 3 in)	Phyllis Blunston	1.88 m (6 ft 2 in)
Long jump	Carol Lewis	6.92 m (22 ft 8 1/4 in)w	Sabrina Williams	6.46 m (21 ft 2 1/4 in)w	Esmerelda Garcia (Brazil)	6.39 m (20 ft 11 1/2 in)
Triple jump	Wendy Brown	13.17 m (43 ft 2 1/2 in)	Donna Thomas	13.13 m (43 ft 3/4 in)	Terri Turner	13.11 m (43 ft 0 in)
Shot put	Ramona Pagel	18.40 m (60 ft 4 1/4 in)	Peggy Pollock	17.56 m (57 ft 7 1/4 in)	Regina Cavanaugh	16.94 m (55 ft 6 3/4 in)
Discus throw	Carol Cady	61.19 m (200 ft 9 in)	Penny Neer	56.44 m (185 ft 2 in)	Lorna Griffin	54.66 m (179 ft 3 in)
Javelin throw	Cathy Sulinski	60.25 m (197 ft 8 in)	Lori Mercer	57.50 m (188 ft 7 in)	Linda Sutfin	57.12 m (187 ft 4 in)
Heptathlon	Jane Frederick	6587	Jolanda Jones	5765	Lana Zimmerman	5606

== See also ==
- United States Olympic Trials (track and field)
