= 1983 USA Outdoor Track and Field Championships =

- Dates: June 18–20
- Host city: Indianapolis, Indiana, United States
- Venue: IUPUI Track and Soccer Stadium

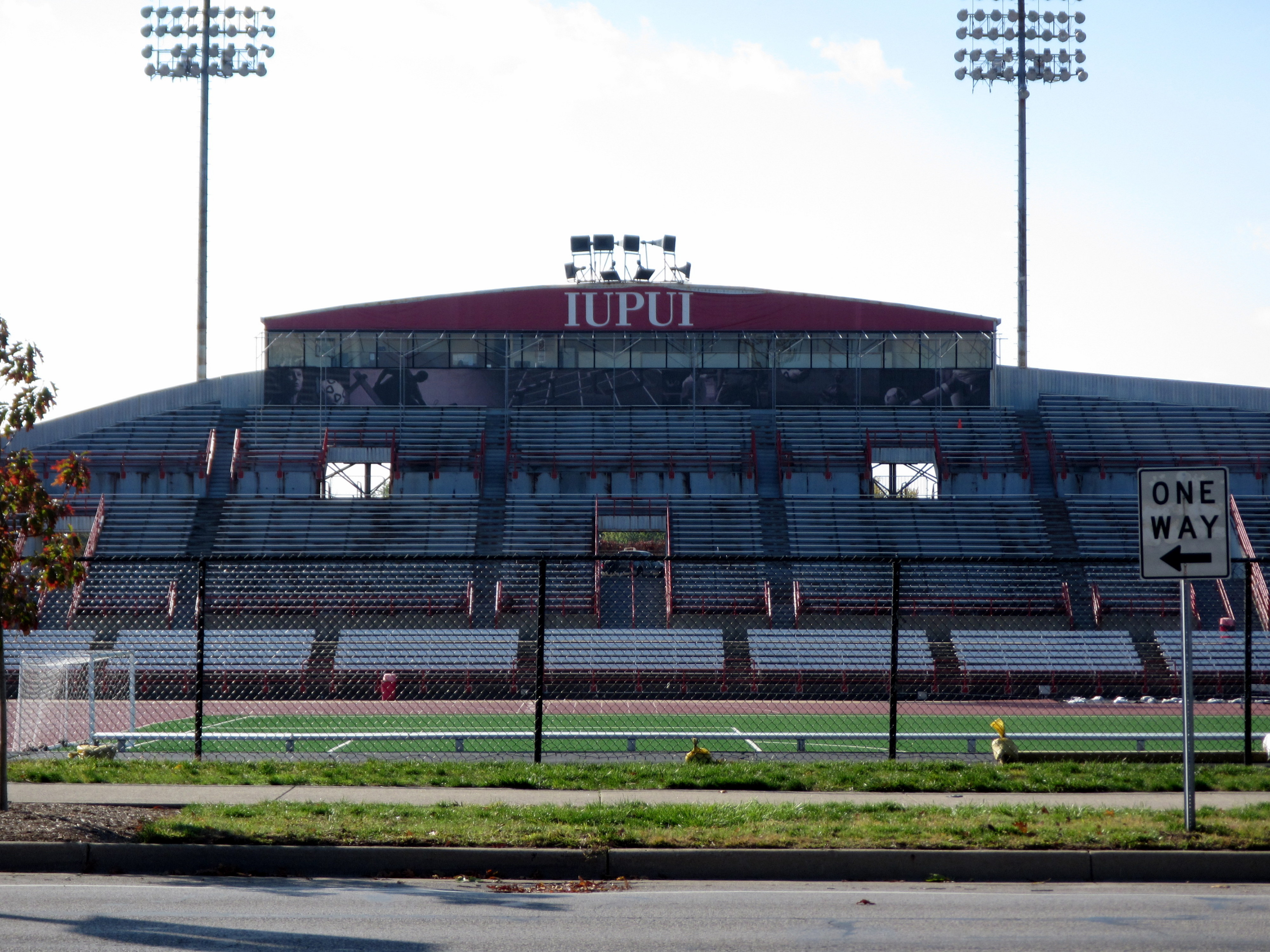

The 1983 USA Outdoor Track and Field Championships took place between June 18–20 at IUPUI Track and Soccer Stadium on the campus of Indiana University-Purdue University Indianapolis in Indianapolis, Indiana. The meet was organized by The Athletics Congress.

The Marathon championships were the San Francisco Marathon for men and the Avon International Marathon for women.

In addition to being the National Championship, it was the selection meet to international teams including for the 1983 World Championships in Athletics.

This meet is famous for Carl Lewis' 200 meters, where after clearly separating from his competitors. he began celebrating more than 10 meters from the finish. Presumed to have slowed because of the celebration, Lewis missed Pietro Mennea's altitude assisted world record by .03. While he won the Olympic gold medal the following year, Lewis would never run faster.

== Results ==
=== Men track events ===
Event	Gold		Silver		Bronze	
100 meters (-2.4 m/s)	Carl Lewis	10.27	Emmit King	10.33	Calvin Smith	10.42
200 meters (+1.5 m/s)	Carl Lewis	19.75 AR, CR	Larry Myricks	20.03	Calvin Smith	20.13
400 meters	Sunder Nix	45.15	Eliot Tabron	45.31	Michael Franks	45.49
800 meters	David Patrick	1:44.70	David Mack	1:44.78	James Robinson	1:44.78
1500 meters	Steve Scott	3:36.67	Tom Byers	3:36.77	Sydney Maree	3:36.78
5000 meters	Doug Padilla	13:25.14	Jim Spivey	13:26.09	Jim Hill	13:27.63
10,000 meters	Alberto Salazar	28:11.64	Craig Virgin	28:13.06	Mark Nenow	28:14.37
110 meters hurdles (-0.6 m/s)	Greg Foster	13.26	Sam Turner	13.62	Willie Gault	13.67 MRm
400 meters hurdles	Edwin Moses	47.84	David Lee	49.5	Andre Phillips	50.02
3000 meters steeplechase	Henry Marsh	8:21.05	Brian Diemer	8:22.13	Ricky Pittman	8:23.66
20,000 metres race walk (track)	Jim Heiring	1:26:54.2	Marco Evoniuk	1:27:44.8	Dan O'Connor	1:29:37.2

=== Men field events ===
Event	Gold		Silver		Bronze	
High jump	Dwight Stones	7 ft 6 in (2.28 m)	Leo Williams	7 ft 5 in (2.26 m)	Tyke Peacock	7 ft 5 in (2.26 m)
Pole vault	Jeff Buckingham	18 ft 0 1/2 in (5.49 m)	Billy Olson	18 ft 0 1/2 in (5.49 m)	Mike Tully	17 ft 8 1/2 in (5.39 m)
Long jump	Carl Lewis	28 ft 10 1/4 in (8.79 m) CR	Jason Grimes	27 ft 6 1/2 in (8.39 m)	Mike Conley	27 ft 6 in (8.38 m)w
Triple jump	Willie Banks	56 ft 7 1/2 in (17.25 m)	Mike Conley	56 ft 5 3/4 in (17.21 m)	Al Joyner	56 ft 2 in (17.11 m)
Shot put	Dave Laut	71 ft 2 3/4 in (21.71 m)	Kevin Akins	70 ft 7 1/4 in (21.52 m)	Mike Lehmann	69 ft 8 3/4 in (21.25 m)
Discus throw	John Powell	222 ft 0 in (67.66 m)	Ben Plucknett	220 ft 0 in (67.05 m)	Mac Wilkins	217 ft 6 in (66.29 m)
Hammer throw	Dave McKenzie	241 ft 2 in (73.5 m)	Ed Burke	236 ft 11 in (72.21 m)	John McArdle	234 ft 4 in (71.42 m)
Javelin throw	Rod Ewaliko	285 ft 3 in (86.94 m)	Tom Petranoff	280 ft 3 in (85.42 m)	Bob Roggy	271 ft 1 in (82.62 m)
Decathlon	Mark Anderson	8152	John Crist	7998	Gary Bastien	7877

=== Women track events ===
Event	Gold		Silver		Bronze	
100 meters	Evelyn Ashford	11.24	Diane Williams	11.29	Chandra Cheeseborough	11.31
200 meters	Evelyn Ashford	21.88	Chandra Cheeseborough	21.99	Florence Griffith	22.23
400 meters	Denean Howard	50.99	Rosalyn Bryant	51.58	Roberta Belle	51.72
800 meters	Robin Campbell	1.59.00	Diana Richburg	2.00.82	Lee Arbogast	2.01.07
1500 meters	Mary Decker	4.03.50	Cindy Bremser	4.09.62	Missy Kane	4.10.92
3000 meters	Mary Decker	8.38.36	Brenda Webb	8.48.09	Kate Keyes	8.49.96
5000 meters	Judi St Hilaire	16:02.16	Amy Harper	16:08.17	Tori Neubauer	16:08.73
10,000 meters	Katie Ishmael	33:24.71	Beth Farmer	33:30.44	Jill Molenkoven	33:35.19
Marathon	Julie Brown	2:26:26	Christa Vahlensieck Germany; Marianne Dickerson	2:33:22; 2:33:45	Laura Fogli Italy; Joyce Smith United Kingdom; Debbie Eide	2:34:19; 2:34:39; 2:35:15
100 meters hurdles	Benita Fitzgerald	12.97	Pam Page	13.14	Candy Young	13.16
400 meters hurdles	Sharieffa Barksdale	56.07	Judi Brown	56.51	Tonja Brown	56.64
5 km walk	Sue Liers-Westerfield	24:42				
10,000 m walk	Sue Liers-Westerfield	50:51.91				
20 km walk	Sue Liers-Westerfield	1:50:28				

=== Women field events ===
Event	Gold		Silver		Bronze	
High jump	Louise Ritter	1.93 m (6 ft 3 3/4 in)	Pam Spencer	1.93 m (6 ft 3 3/4 in)	Joni Huntley	1.90 m (6 ft 2 3/4 in)
Long jump	Carol Lewis	6.91 m (22 ft 8 in)	Jennifer Inniss Guyana; Gwen Loud	6.85 m (22 ft 5 1/2 in)w 6.65 m (21 ft 9 3/4 in)w	Jackie Joyner	6.63 m (21 ft 9 in)
Shot put	Denise Wood	17.28 m (56 ft 8 1/4 in)	Lorna Griffin	17.19 m (56 ft 4 3/4 in)	Regina Cavanaugh	16.90 m (55 ft 5 1/4 in)
Discus throw	Leslie Deniz	62.86 m (206 ft 2 in)	Meg Ritchie United Kingdom; Carol Cady	61.85 m (202 ft 11 in); 60.04 m (196 ft 11 in)	Lorna Griffin	59.56 m (195 ft 4 in)
Javelin throw	Karin Smith	57.20 m (187 ft 7 in)	Kathy Schmidt	57.15 m (187 ft 6 in)	Deanna Carr	56.36 m (184 ft 10 in)
Heptathlon	Jane Frederick	6457	Jackie Joyner	6372	Marlene Harmon	6152

== See also ==
- United States Olympic Trials (track and field)
