= USA Outdoor Track and Field Championships =

Annual track and field competition

- Current season, competition or edition: 2026 USA Outdoor Track and Field Championships
- Sport: Track and field
- Founded: 1980 (USATF); 1876 (NYAC)
- Country: United States
- Related competitions: U.S. Olympic Trials
- Website: USATF Official website

The USA Track & Field Outdoor Championships is an annual track and field competition organized by USA Track & Field, which serves as the American national championships for the sport. Since the year 1992, in the years which feature a Summer Olympics, World Athletics Championships, Pan American Games, NACAC Championships, or an IAAF Continental Cup, the championships serve as a way of selecting the best athletes for those competitions.

== History ==
The history of the competition starts in 1876, when the New York Athletic Club (NYAC) decided to organize a national championships. Having previously held the NYAC Spring and Fall Games. The seventh, eight, and ninth edition of the Fall Games became the country's first, second and third national track and field championships. The Amateur Championship of America (prior to N.A.A.A.) 1876 to 1878 were all held in Mott Haven, New York. April 22, 1879 N.A.A.A. was formed. The National Association of Amateur Athletes of America (N.A.A.A.), began sponsoring the meeting in 1879, and organized the championships up to 1887. Past N.A.A.A. presidents were 1879 George W Carr was elected president, 1880 & 1881 & 1882 A. H. Curtis was elected president, 1883 & 1884 & 1885 Gilbert H Badeu elected president, and 1887 Walter Storm was elected. At this point, the Amateur Athletic Union (AAU), a more powerful athletic organization, began to hold their own version of the national championships. Two national championships were held in 1888, but the NAAA disbanded after this. The NAAA Championships 1879 to 1888 were all held in New York. Sept 19, 1888 the First AAU Outdoor Championship was held in Detroit, MI. Sept 14, 1889 Second Annual AAU T&F Championship competition was held at Travers Island, NY. Oct 11, 1890 Third Annual AAU T&F National Championship competition was held at Washington, DC. The AAU was the sole organizer of the event for the next ninety years. In 1923, the AAU also sponsored the first American Track & Field championships for women.

As a result of the Sports Act of 1978, the AAU no longer had power over Olympic sports in the United States. A spin-off group, The Athletics Congress, held its first national track and field championships in 1980. The Athletics Congress was renamed USA Track & Field in 1993, and they have organized the annual championships ever since.

Beginning in 2025, the USATF Para National Championships have been combined with the USATF Outdoor Championships.

=== 2020 Olympic trials ===
The United States Olympic & Paralympic Committee (USOPC), and the TrackTown USA Local Organizing Committee announced the release of the updated competition schedule for the 2020 U.S. Olympic Team Trials – Track and Field, that will take place June 18-27, 2021, at Hayward Field in Eugene, Oregon.

== Events ==
The following athletics events are currently featured on the national championships' program:

- Sprint: 100 m, 200 m, 400 m
- Middle distance track events: 800 m, 1500 m
- Long distance track events: 5000 m, 10,000 m
- Hurdles: 100 m hurdles, 110 m hurdles, 400 m hurdles, 3000 m steeplechase
- Jumps: long jump, triple jump, high jump, pole vault
- Throws: shot put, discus, hammer, javelin
- Combined events: heptathlon, decathlon
- Walks: 20 km walk (road) / 20000 m walk (track)

In earlier editions before 1974, running distances were often measured in yards. All races were in yards until 1928. From then on, races were measured in meters for Olympic years and yards for other years, except 1933 to 1951 inclusive and 1959. In the early years, the 220 yard hurdles were included for many years in lieu of the 440 yard hurdles. The 220 yard hurdles were first included 1887 through 1962. USATF website lists Past Outdoor Champions (all events) on the statistic section of their website.

The cover page of the 1888 Program states "First Annual Championship Games Amateur Athletic Union of the United States".

== Editions ==
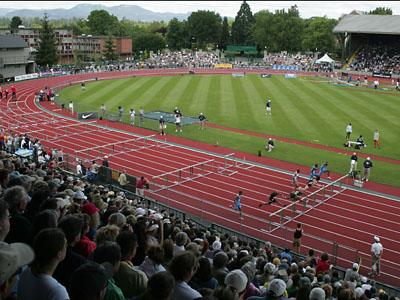
Hayward Field has hosted the championships over 10 times, the most of all venues.

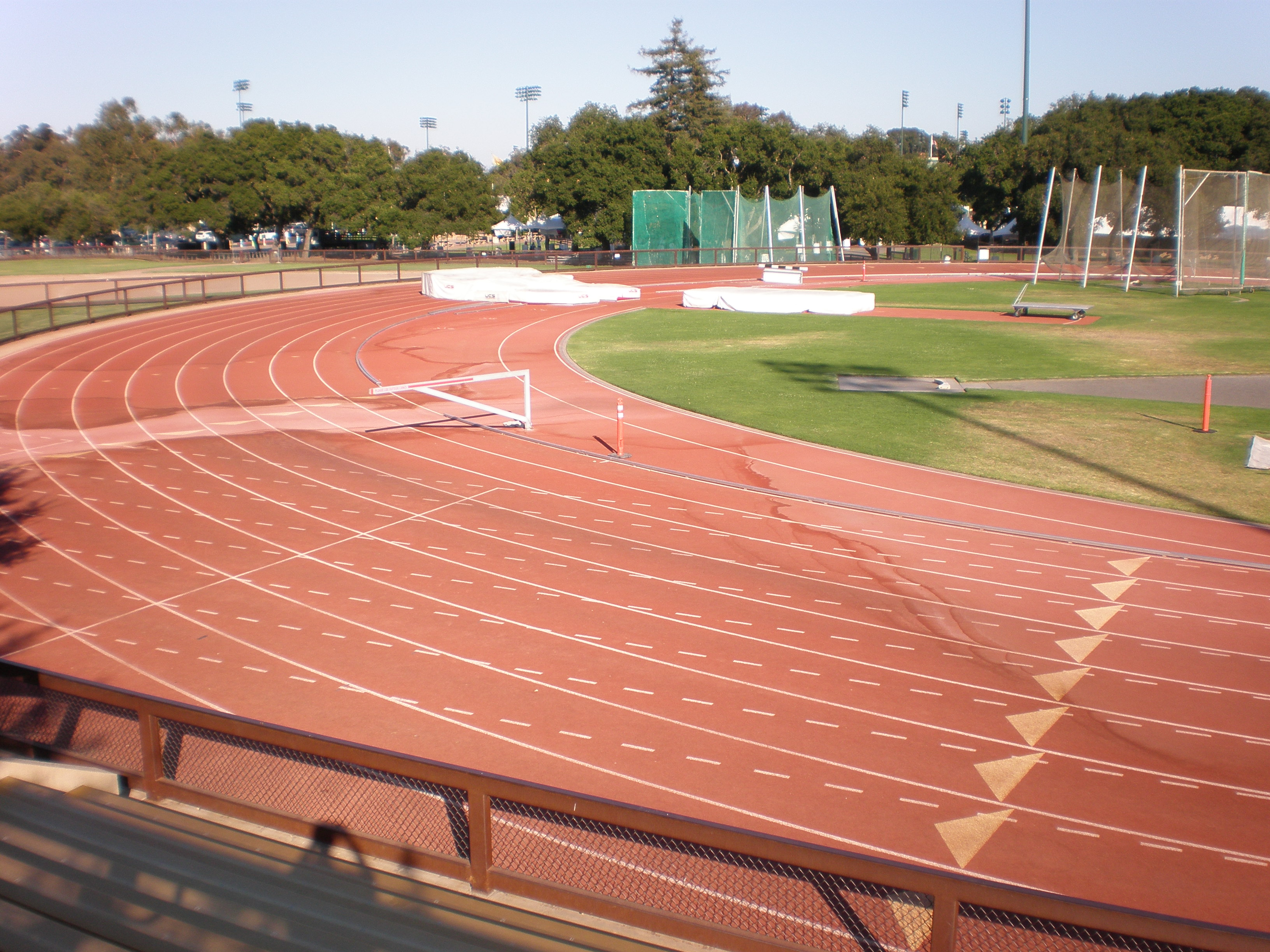
The Cobb Track and Angell Field stadium has played host to the championships on two occasions.

Edition	Venue	Stadium	Date
2027	Eugene, Oregon	Hayward Field, University of Oregon	
2026	New York, New York	Icahn Stadium	July 23–26, 2026
2025	Eugene, Oregon	Hayward Field, University of Oregon	July 31–August 3, 2025
2024	Eugene, Oregon	Hayward Field, University of Oregon	June 21–30, 2024
2023	Eugene, Oregon	Hayward Field, University of Oregon	July 6–9, 2023
2022	Eugene, Oregon	Hayward Field, University of Oregon	June 23–26, 2022
2021	Eugene, Oregon	Hayward Field, University of Oregon	June 18–27, 2021
2020	Not held (pandemic)		
2019	Des Moines, Iowa	Drake Stadium, Drake University	July 25–28, 2019
2018	Des Moines, Iowa	Drake Stadium, Drake University	June 21–24, 2018
2017	Sacramento, California	Hornet Stadium, California State University, Sacramento	June 22–25, 2017
2016	Eugene, Oregon	Hayward Field, University of Oregon	July 1–10, 2016
2015	Eugene, Oregon	Hayward Field, University of Oregon	June 25–28, 2015
2014	Sacramento, California	Hornet Stadium, California State University, Sacramento	June 25–29, 2014
2013	Des Moines, Iowa	Drake Stadium, Drake University	June 19–23, 2013
2012	Eugene, Oregon	Hayward Field, University of Oregon	June 21–July 1, 2012
2011	Eugene, Oregon	Hayward Field, University of Oregon	June 23–26, 2011
2010	Des Moines, Iowa	Drake Stadium, Drake University	June 23–27, 2010
2009	Eugene, Oregon	Hayward Field, University of Oregon	June 25–28, 2009
2008	Eugene, Oregon	Hayward Field, University of Oregon	June 27–July 6, 2008
2007	Indianapolis, Indiana	IU Michael A. Carroll Track & Soccer Stadium, IUPUI	June 20–24, 2007
2006	Indianapolis, Indiana	IU Michael A. Carroll Track & Soccer Stadium, IUPUI	June 21–25, 2006
2005	Carson, California	Home Depot Center	June 23–26, 2005
2004	Sacramento, California	Hornet Stadium, California State University, Sacramento	July 9–18, 2004
2003	Palo Alto, California	Cobb Track and Angell Field, Stanford University	June 19–22, 2003
2002	Palo Alto, California	Cobb Track and Angell Field, Stanford University	June 21–23, 2002
2001	Eugene, Oregon	Hayward Field, University of Oregon	June 21–24, 2001
2000	Sacramento, California	Hornet Stadium, California State University, Sacramento	July 14–23, 2000
1999	Eugene, Oregon	Hayward Field, University of Oregon	June 24–27, 1999
1998	New Orleans, Louisiana	Tad Gormley Stadium	June 17–21, 1998
1997	Indianapolis, Indiana	IU Michael A. Carroll Track & Soccer Stadium, IUPUI	June 12–15, 1997
1996	Atlanta, Georgia	Centennial Olympic Stadium	June 14–23, 1996
1995	Sacramento, California	Hughes Stadium, Sacramento City College	June 15–18, 1995
1994	Knoxville, Tennessee	Tom Black Track, University of Tennessee	June 15–18, 22, 1994
1993	Eugene, Oregon	Hayward Field, University of Oregon	June 16–19, 1993
The Athletics Congress of the USA
1992	New Orleans, Louisiana	Tad Gormley Stadium	June 19–28, 1992
1991	New York, New York	Downing Stadium	June 12–15, 1991
1990	Norwalk, California	Cerritos College	June 16–19, 1990
1989	Houston, Texas	University of Houston	June 14–16, 1989
1988	Tampa, Florida	Pepin-Rood Stadium, University of Tampa	June 16–19, 1988
1987	San Jose, California	San Jose City College	June 25–27, 1987
1986	Eugene, Oregon	Hayward Field, University of Oregon	June 19–21, 1986
1985	Indianapolis, Indiana	IUPUI Track and Soccer Stadium, IUPUI	June 14–16, 1985
1984	San Jose, California	San Jose City College	June 8–10, 1984
1983	Indianapolis, Indiana	IUPUI Track and Soccer Stadium, IUPUI	June 17–19, 1983
1982	Knoxville, Tennessee	Tom Black Track, University of Tennessee	June 18–20, 1982
1981	Sacramento, California	Charles C. Hughes Stadium Sacramento City College	June 19–21, 1981
1980	Walnut, California	Hilmer Lodge Stadium, Mt. San Antonio College	June 13–15, 1980
Amateur Athletic Union
1979	Walnut, California	Hilmer Lodge Stadium, Mt. San Antonio College	June 15–17, 1979
1978	Westwood, California	Drake Stadium, UCLA	June 8–10, 1978
1977	Westwood, California	Drake Stadium, UCLA	June 9–11, 1977
1976	Westwood, California	Drake Stadium, UCLA	June 10–12, 1976

== Split gender editions ==
Edition	Men's Venue	Stadium	Date	Women's Venue	Stadium	Date	Events
1975	Eugene, Oregon	Hayward Field, University of Oregon	June 25–27, 1975	White Plains, New York	Glen Loucks Memorial Stadium	June 27-28, 1975	14 + NY Mar.
1974	Westwood, Los Angeles, California	Drake Stadium UCLA	June 21–23, 1974	Bakersfield, California	Memorial Stadium	June 28-29, 1974	15
1973	Bakersfield, California	Memorial Stadium	June 15–17, 1973	Irvine, California	Anteater Stadium	June 22- 23, 1973	14
1972	Seattle, Washington	Husky Stadium	June 16–18, 1972	Canton, Ohio	Citizens Field	July 1-2, 1972	13
1971	Eugene, Oregon	Hayward Field, University of Oregon	June 25–27, 1971	Bakersfield, California	Memorial Stadium	July 9-10, 1971	13
1970	Bakersfield, California	Memorial Stadium	June 26–28, 1970	Westwood, Los Angeles, California	Drake Stadium UCLA	July 3-4, 1970	13
1969	Miami, Florida	Miami Dade College North Stadium	June 27–29, 1969	Dayton, Ohio	Welcome Stadium	July 5-6, 1969	12
1968	Sacramento, California	Charles C. Hughes Stadium, Sacramento City College	June 19–21, 1968	Aurora, Colorado	Aurora Public School Stadium	August 14–18, 1968	12
1967	Bakersfield, California	Memorial Stadium	June 22–23, 1967	Santa Barbara, California	La Playa Stadium	July 1–2, 1967	12
1966	New York City, New York	Downing Stadium	June 25–26, 1966	Frederick, Maryland	Thomas Johnson High School	July 1-2, 1966	12
1965	San Diego, California	Balboa Stadium	June 26–27, 1965	Columbus, Ohio	Whetstone High School	July 1-3, 1965	12
1964	New Brunswick, New Jersey	Rutgers Stadium	June 26–28, 1964	Hanford, California	Neighbor Field	July 9-11, 1964	11
1963	St. Louis, Missouri	Public School Stadium	June 21–22, 1963	Dayton, Ohio	Welcome Stadium	July 4-6, 1963	11
1962	Walnut, California	Mt. San Antonio College, Hilmer Lodge Stadium	June 22–23, 1962	Los Angeles, California	Memorial Coliseum	July 7-8, 1962	11
1961	New York City, New York	Downing Stadium	June 23–24, 1961	Gary, Indiana	Gilroy Field	July 1-2, 1961	11
1960	Bakersfield, California	Memorial Stadium	June 24–25, 1960	Corpus Christi, Texas	Buccaneer Stadium	July 8-9, 1960	11
1959	Boulder, Colorado	Folsom Field	June 19–20, 1959	Cleveland, Ohio	John Adams Field	June 27- 28, 1959	12
1958	Bakersfield, California	Memorial Stadium	June 20–21, 1958	Morristown, New Jersey	Memorial Field	July 4-5, 1958	11
1957	Dayton, Ohio	Welcome Stadium	June 21–22, 1957	Shaker Heights, Ohio	Shaker Heights High School Field	August 9- 10, 1957	10
1956	Bakersfield, California	Memorial Stadium	June 22–23, June	Philadelphia, Pennsylvania	Franklin Field	August 17-18, 1956	10
1955	Boulder, Colorado	Folsom Field	June 24–25, 1955	Ponca City, Oklahoma	Blaine Stadium	June 17-18, 1955	10
1954	St. Louis, Missouri	Public Schools Stadium	June 18–19, 1954	Harrisburg, Pennsylvania		July 30- 31, 1954	10
1953	Dayton, Ohio	Welcome Stadium	June 26–27, 1953	San Antonio, Texas	Alamo Heights Stadium	July 24-25, 1953	10
1952	Long Beach, California	Veterans Memorial Stadium	June 20–21, 1953	Waterbury, Connecticut	Municipal Stadium	June 29, 1952	10
1951	Berkeley, California	Edwards Stadium	June 22–23, 1951	Waterbury, Connecticut	Municipal Stadium	August 12, 1951	10
1950	College Park, Maryland	Byrd Stadium	June 23–24, 1950	Freeport, Texas	Hopper Field	August 25- 26, 1950	10
1949	Fresno, California	Ratcliffe Stadium	June 24–25, 1949	Odessa, Texas	Broncho Stadium	August 12-13, 1949	9
1948	Milwaukee, Wisconsin	Marquette Stadium	July 2–3, 1948	Grand Rapids, Michigan	Houseman Field	July 6, 1948	9
1947	Lincoln, Nebraska	Memorial Stadium (Lincoln)	July 3–4, 1947	San Antonio, Texas	Alamo Stadium	June 28-29,1947	9
1946	San Antonio, Texas	Alamo Stadium	June 28–29, 1946	Buffalo, New York	All- High Stadium	August 4, 1946	9
1945	New York City, New York	Downing Stadium	June 29–30, 1945	Harrisburg, Pennsylvania	Fager Field	June 30, 1945	
1944	New York City, New York	Downing Stadium	June 17–18, 1944	Harrisburg, Pennsylvania	Fager Field	July 8, 1944	
1943	New York City, New York	Downing Stadium	June 19–20, 1943	Lakewood, Ohio	Lakewood High School	August 15, 1943	
1942	New York City, New York	Downing Stadium	June 19–20, 1942	Ocean City, New Jersey	Carey Stadium	July 4, 1942	
1941	Philadelphia, Pennsylvania	Franklin Field	June 24–25, 1941	Ocean City, New Jersey	Carey Stadium	July 5, 1941	
1940	Fresno, California	Ratcliffe Stadium	June 28–29, 1940	Ocean City, New Jersey	Carey Stadium	July 7, 1940	
1939	Lincoln, Nebraska	Memorial Stadium (Lincoln)	July 3–4, 1939	Waterbury, Connecticut	Municipal Stadium	September 4, 1939	
1938	Buffalo, New York	Civic Stadium	July 2–3, 1938	Naugatuck, Connecticut	Recreation Field	August 4, 1938	
1937	Milwaukee, Wisconsin	Marquette Stadium	July 2–3, 1937	Trenton, New Jersey	Trenton High School	September 25, 1937	
1936	Princeton, New Jersey	Palmer Stadium	July 3–4, 1936	Providence, Rhode Island	Brown University Field	July 4, 1936	
1935	Lincoln, Nebraska	Memorial Stadium (Lincoln)	July 3–4, 1935	New York, New York	NYU Ohio Field	September 14, 1935	
1934	Milwaukee, Wisconsin	Marquette Stadium	June 29–30, 1934	not held			
1933	Chicago, Illinois	Soldier Field	June 30-July 1, 1933	Chicago, Illinois	Soldier Field	June 30, 1933	
1932	Palo Alto, California	Stanford Stadium	July 15–16, 1932	Evanston, Illinois	Dyche Stadium	July 16- 17, 1932	
1931	Lincoln, Nebraska	Memorial Stadium (Lincoln)	July 3–4, 1931	Jersey City, New Jersey	Pershing Field	July 25, 1931	
1930	Pittsburgh, Pennsylvania	Pitt Stadium	August 22–25, 1930	Dallas, Texas	Ownby Stadium	July 4, 1930	
1929	Denver, Colorado	DU Stadium	July 3–5, 1929	Chicago, Illinois	Soldier Field	July 27, 1929	
1928	Philadelphia, Pennsylvania; Cambridge, Massachusetts	Franklin Field; Harvard Stadium	July 3–5, 1928; July 6–7, 1928	Newark, New Jersey	City Field	July 4, 1928	
1927	Lincoln, Nebraska	Memorial Stadium (Lincoln)	July 2–4, 1927	Eureka, California	Allbee Stadium	September 3, 1927	
1926	Philadelphia, Pennsylvania	Municipal Stadium	July 2, 5-6, 1926	Philadelphia, Pennsylvania	Municipal Stadium	July 9–10, 1926	
1925	San Francisco, California	Kezar Stadium	July 2–4, 1925	Pasadena, California	Paddock Field	July 11, 1925	
1924	West Orange, New Jersey	Colgate Field, Newark Athletic Country Club	September 5–7, 1924	Pittsburgh, Pennsylvania	Forbes Field	September 20, 1924	
1923	Chicago, Illinois	Stagg Field	Sept 1, 1923	Newark, New Jersey	Weequahic Park	September 29, 1923	

The track surface changed over these years. Synthetic tracks were used in the men's editions in 1963 (rubber), 1965, 1969, 1971, 1972 and from 1974 on. The tracks in the other years were cinders, sometimes with a mix of brick (1967, 1970 and 1973). 1923 was the First AAU Women’s National Championship.

== Men only editions ==
Edition	Venue	Stadium	Date
1922	Newark, New Jersey	Weequahic Park	September 9–11, 1922
1921	Pasadena, California	Paddock Field	July 3–5, 1921
1920	Cambridge, Massachusetts	Harvard Stadium	July 17, 1920
1919	Philadelphia, Pennsylvania	Franklin Field	September 13, 1919
1918	Great Lakes, Illinois	Great Lakes Naval Station	September 21, 1918
1917	St Louis, Missouri	Washington University in St. Louis	August 31-September 1, 1917
1916	Newark, New Jersey	Weequahic Park	September 9, 1916
1915	San Francisco, California	Panama–Pacific International Exposition	August 7, 1915
1914	Baltimore, Maryland	Homewood Field	September 12, 1914
1913	Chicago, Illinois	Grant Park (Chicago)	July 5, 1913
1912	Pittsburgh, Pennsylvania	Forbes Field	September 21, 1912
1911	Pittsburgh, Pennsylvania	Forbes Field	July 1, 1911
1910	New Orleans, Louisiana	Tulane Park	October 14-15, 1910
1909	Seattle, Washington	Alaska-Yukon-Pacific Exposition Grounds; University of Washington	August 15, 1909
1908	New York, New York	New York AC Grounds, Travers Island	September 19, 1908
1907	Norfolk, Virginia	Jamestown Exposition, Sewell's Point	September 7, 1907
1906	New York, New York	New York AC Grounds, Travers Island	September 8, 1906
1905	Portland, Oregon	Lewis and Clark Centennial Exposition; Guild's Lake	August 5, 1905
1904	St. Louis, Missouri	Francis Field	June 4, 1904
1903	Milwaukee, Wisconsin	Wisconsin State Fair Park	September 11, 1903
1902	New York, New York	New York AC Grounds, Travers Island	September 12, 1902
1901	Buffalo, New York	Pan-American Exposition	June 15, 1901
1900	New York, New York	Columbia Field	September 15, 1900
1899	Newtown, Massachusetts	Riverside Recreation Club’s Field	August 26, 1899
1898	Chicago, Illinois	Marshall Field	June 23, 1898
1897	Manhattan, New York	Manhattan Field	August 28, 1897
1896	Manhattan, New York	Manhattan Field	September 12, 1896
1895	Manhattan, New York	Manhattan Field	September 14, 1895
1894	New York, New York	New York AC Grounds, Travers Island	September 15, 1894
1893	Chicago, Illinois	Marshall Field	September 16, 1893
1892	Manhattan, New York	Manhattan Field	October 1, 1892
1891	St Louis, Missouri	Fair Grounds	October 3, 1891
1890	Washington, D.C.	Analostan Island	October 11, 1890
1889	New York, New York	New York AC Grounds, Travers Island	September 14, 1889
1888	Detroit, Michigan	Detroit Athletic Club Grounds	September 19, 1888

== NAAA National Championships (prior to AAU) 1879 to 1888 ==
In 1888 there was both a NAAA and AAU Championships. Competitions were held at various athletic clubs grounds.

1888 Manhattan AC grounds, New York city Oct. 13, 1888

1887 Manhattan AC grounds, New York city Sept 17, 1887

1886-2 NYAC grounds, Mott Haven, NY Sept 18, 1886

1886-1 Staten Island AC grounds, West Brighton, Staten Island June 26, 1886

1885 Manhattan AC grounds, New York city June 13 or 18, 1885

1884 Williamsburg AC grounds, Brooklyn Sept 28, 1884

1883 NYAC grounds, Mott Haven, NY June 3, 1883

1882 Polo grounds, New York city June 10, 1882

1881 NYAC grounds, Mott Haven, NY Sept 24, 1881

1880 NYAC grounds, Mott Haven, NY Sept 25, 1880

1879 NYAC grounds, Mott Haven, NY Sept 27, 1879

== Amateur National Championships (prior to NAAA) 1876 to 1879 ==
In 1879 the meet doubled at the 1st AAU Championship.

1878 Mott Haven, NY Oct 12, 1878

1877 Mott Haven, NY Sept 8, 1877

1876 Mott Haven, NY Sept 30, 1876

The 1876 Amateur Championship included the following winners: Frederick C Saportas (100), Edward Merritt (440), Harold Lambe (Canadian) (880 and mile), George Hitchcock (120 hurdles), H Edwards Fickens (HJ), Isaiah Frazier (LJ), Harry Buermeyer (SP), William Buckingham Curtis(HT), and D M Stern & Charles Connor (Walks).

== Records ==
Championships records
Event	Men						Women				
Event	Athlete	Record	Date	Championship	Ref.	Video	Athlete	Record	Date	Championship	Ref.
100 m	Fred Kerley	9.76 (+1.4 m/s) (Note: Tyson Gay ran 9.75 at the 2013 Des Moines edition, but his performance was annulled after the race for doping.)	24 June 2022	2022 Eugene			Marion Jones	10.71	19 June 1998	1998 New Orleans	
100 m	Fred Kerley	9.76 (+1.4 m/s)	24 June 2022	2022 Eugene			Sha'Carri Richardson	10.71 (+0.1 m/s)	6 July 2023	2023 Eugene	
200 m	Noah Lyles	19.53 (+0.5 m/s)	29 June 2024	2024 Eugene			Gabrielle Thomas	21.60 (−0.4 m/s)	9 July 2023	2023 Eugene	
400 m	Michael Johnson	43.44	19 June 1996	1996 Atlanta			Sydney McLaughlin-Levrone	48.74	8 July 2023	2023 Eugene	
800 m	Donavan Brazier	1:42.16	3 August 2025	2025 Eugene			Athing Mu	1:56.07	27 June 2021	2021 Eugene	
1500 m	Cole Hocker	3:30.59	24 June 2024	2024 Eugene			Nikki Hiltz	3:55.33	30 June 2024	2024 Eugene	
3000 m	-	-					Mary Decker	8:38.36	19 June 1983	1983 Indianapolis	
5000 m	Grant Fisher	13:03.86	26 June 2022	2022 Eugene			Elle Purrier St. Pierre	14:40.34	24 June 2024	2024 Eugene	
10,000 m	Galen Rupp	27:25.33	22 June 2012	2012 Eugene			Karissa Schweizer	30:49.56	27 May 2022	2022 Eugene	
100 m hurdles	—	—					Masai Russell	12.25 (+0.7 m/s)	30 June 2024	2024 Eugene	
110 m hurdles	Allen Johnson	12.92	23 June 1996	1996 Atlanta							
110 m hurdles	Grant Holloway	12.92 (+0.8 m/s)	24 June 2024	2024 Eugene			—	—	—	—	
400 m hurdles	Rai Benjamin	46.62	9 July 2023	2023 Eugene			Sydney McLaughlin-Levrone	50.65	30 June 2024	2024 Eugene	
3000 m steeplechase	Evan Jager	8:12.29	28 June 2015	2015 Eugene			Valerie Constien	9:03.22	27 June 2024	2024 Eugene	
High jump	Jesse Williams	2.37 m	26 June 2011	2011 Eugene							
High jump	Erik Kynard	2.37 m	26 June 2015	2015 Eugene			Chaunte Howard	2.05 m	26 June 2010	2010 Des Moines	
Pole vault	Sam Kendricks	6.06 m	27 July 2019	2019 Des Moines			Katie Nageotte	4.95 m	26 June 2021	2021 Eugene	
Long jump	Carl Lewis	8.79 m	19 June 1983	1983 Indianapolis			Brittney Reese	7.31 m (+1.7 m/s)	1 July 2016	2016 Eugene	
Triple jump	Willie Banks	17.97 m	16 June 1985	1985 Indianapolis			Keturah Orji	14.79 m (+1.8 m/s)	25 June 2022	2022 Eugene	
Shot put	Ryan Crouser	23.37 m WR	18 June 2021	2021 Eugene			Chase Ealey	20.51 m	26 June 2022	2022 Eugene	
Discus throw	John Powell	71.26 m	9 June 1984	1984 San Jose			Valarie Allman	71.45 m	3 August 2025	2025 Eugene	
Hammer throw	Rudy Winkler	82.71 m	20 June 2021	2021 Eugene			DeAnna Price	80.31 m	26 June 2021	2021 Eugene	
Javelin throw	Breaux Greer	91.29 m	21 June 2007	2007 Indianapolis			Kara Patterson	66.67 m	25 June 2010	2010 Des Moines	
Decathlon; Heptathlon	Ashton Eaton	9039 pts	22–23 June 2012	2012 Eugene			Jackie Joyner-Kersee	6979 pts	23–24 June 1987	1987 San Jose	
10,000 m walk (track)	Nick Christie	41:56.61	28 July 2019	2019 Des Moines			Katie Burnett	46:12.45	28 July 2019	2019 Des Moines	
20,000 m walk (track)	Trevor Barron	1:23:00.10	22 June 2012	2012 Eugene			Teresa Vaill	1:33:28.15	2005	2005 Carson	
20 km walk (road)	Curt Clausen	1:23:34					Michelle Rohl	1:32:39	2000	2000 Sacramento	
10 km walk (road)	-	-					Teresa Vaill	45:01	1995	1995 Sacramento	

== Most successful athletes ==
=== By event ===
Event	Male athlete	Most wins	Female athlete	Most wins
50 metres	Not contested		Alice Coachman	5
100 metres	Carl Lewis; Justin Gatlin	5	Evelyn Ashford	5
200 metres	Ralph Metcalfe; Michael Johnson; Noah Lyles	5	Stella Walsh	11
400 metres	Lon Myers	6	Sanya Richards-Ross	6
800 metres	Mark Everett	8	Madeline Manning	6
1500 metres	Joie Ray	8	Regina Jacobs	11
3000 metres	Not contested		Jan Merrill	4
5000 metres	Bernard Lagat	8	Shelby Houlihan	4
10,000 metres	Galen Rupp	8	Lynn Jennings	7
110/100 m hurdles	Allen Johnson	7	Gail Devers	10
200 m hurdles	John Eller	5	Pat Hawkins	4
400 m hurdles	Oris Erwin; Edwin Moses; Bershawn Jackson	5	Kim Batten	6
3000 m steeplechase	Joe McCluskey; Henry Marsh	9	Emma Coburn	10
20,000 m walk (track)	Kevin Eastler; Tim Seaman	4	Maria Michta-Coffey	5
High jump	Dwight Stones; Charles Austin	6	Alice Coachman	10
Pole vault	Bob Richards	9	Jenn Suhr	10
Pole vault for distance	Platt Adams	4	Not contested	
Long jump	DeHart Hubbard; Ralph Boston; Arnie Robinson; Carl Lewis; Mike Powell	6	Willye White	12
Triple jump	Dan Ahearn	8	Sheila Hudson	7
Shot put	George Gray	10	Connie Price-Smith	11
Discus throw	Fortune Gordien; Al Oerter; Mac Wilkins	6	Frances Kaszubski Valarie Allman	7
Hammer throw	Hal Connolly; Lance Deal James Mitchel	9	Dawn Ellerbe	6
Javelin throw	Breaux Greer	8	Dorothy Dodson	11
Weight throw	James Mitchel	11	Not contested	
Baseball	Not contested		Babe Didrikson Zaharias; Marion Barone; Juanita Watson; Marion Brown	3
Pentathlon	Eulace Peacock	6	Not contested	
Heptathlon	Not contested		Jane Frederick	9
Decathlon	Dan O'Brien; Tom Pappas	5	Not contested	
All around	Bill Urban	5	Not contested	

Total

Athletes with ten or more outdoor titles in any track or field events include Marion Jones (10), Lynn Jennings (10), Emma Coburn (10), George Gray (10), Bernard Lagat (10), Allyson Felix (10), Jenn Suhr (10), Jane Frederick (11), Willye White (12), Gail Devers (12), Joe McCluskey (12), Carl Lewis (13), Joie Ray (13), Dorothy Dodson (15), Jackie Joyner-Kersee (15), Regina Jacobs (15), Connie Price-Smith (18), Alice Coachman (18), James Mitchel (20), and Stella Walsh (27). Galen Rupp has ten titles between track and the marathon. Willye White has the most titles in a single event (12, long jump).

== See also ==
- List of USA Outdoor Track and Field Championships winners (men)
- List of USA Outdoor Track and Field Championships winners (women)
- USA Track & Field Indoor Championships
- United States Olympic Trials (track and field)
- USA Marathon Championships
- USA Half Marathon Championships
- USA Cross Country Championships
