= Jim Wooding =

American decathlete

Jimmie Dale Wooding (born February 6, 1954, in St. Louis, Missouri) is a retired decathlete from the United States, who finished seventh in the World with 8091 points at the 1984 Summer Olympics in Los Angeles, California. He is a two-time national champion (1981 and 1984) in the men's decathlon. He is a member of the IUP Hall of Fame.
