= Rod Ewaliko =

American track and field athlete

Personal information
- Born: April 18, 1954 (age 72)

Sport
- Sport: Track and field

Rod Ewaliko (born April 18, 1954) is an American track and field athlete known for the Javelin throw. He was the 1983 National Champion and won the 1980 Olympic Trials to become a member of the team that did not participate in the Olympics due to the 1980 Summer Olympics boycott. He was one of 461 athletes to receive a Congressional Gold Medal instead. Ewaliko would finish in second place in the National Championships five times. He threw in two other Olympic Trials, finishing sixth in 1976 and was unable to land a legal throw in the finals of 1984.

Ewaliko represented the United States in several international competitions, finishing fourth in the 1977 and 1981 World Cup, sixth at the 1979 Pan American Games, and eleventh at the 1983 World Championships. He represented Athletics West. He threw collegially for the University of Washington where he was one of the four U of W athletes to sweep the throwing events at the 1976 Pac-10 Championships, a feat that has not been duplicated. His personal best of 90.66 m (297 ft 5 in), thrown at UCSB on February 25, 1984, ranks as the 41st best effort with the old style javelin.
