= Patricia Clark =

American poet and professor (born 1952)

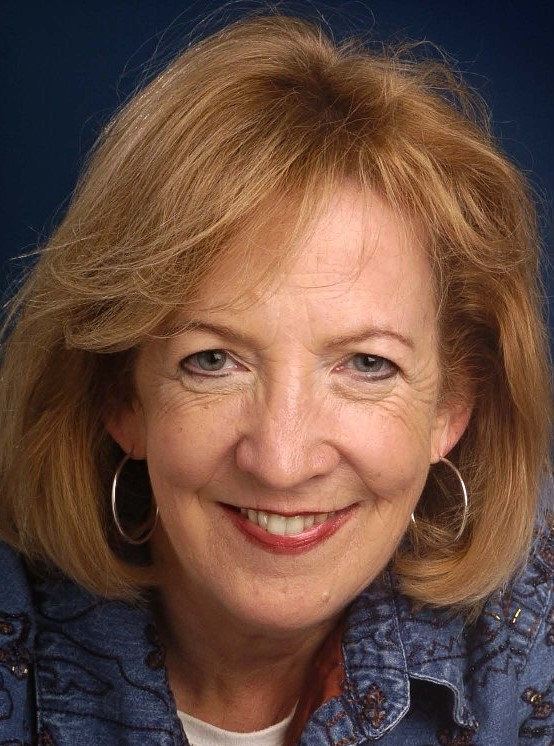
- Born: 1952 (age 73–74); Tacoma, Washington, U.S.
- Education: University of Washington (BA); University of Montana (MFA); University of Houston (PhD)
- Occupation: Poet
- Writing career
- Language: English
- Genre: Poetry
- Website: www.patriciafclark.com

Patricia Clark is an American poet and professor.

== Life ==
Patricia Clark was raised in Tacoma, Washington. She earned degrees in Creative Writing (M.F.A. Creative Writing, University of Montana) and English (PhD English, University of Houston). Her B.A. is economics (B.A. Economics, University of Washington).

Clark is poet-in-residence and professor in the Department of Writing at Grand Valley State University in Michigan. She is the author of six books of poetry.

The Poet Laureate of Grand Rapids, Michigan from 2005 to 2007, Clark was invited with two other poets to open the Library of Congress's noon reading series in Washington, D.C. in fall 2005.

Clark previously did residencies at the Virginia Center for the Creative Arts, the MacDowell Colony, and the Tyrone Guthrie Centre in Ireland.

Her work has appeared in The Atlantic, Slate, Poetry, North American Review, Barrow Street (magazine) and Lake Effect (journal).

Sunday Rising received a positive review in Colorado Review.

== Selected works ==
=== Books ===
- Self-Portrait with a Million Dollars, poetry (Terrapin Books, 2020)
- The Canopy, poetry (Terrapin Books, 2017)
- Sunday Rising, poetry (Michigan State University Press, 2013)
- She Walks into the Sea, poetry (Michigan State University Press, 2009)
- My Father on a Bicycle, poetry (Michigan State University Press, 2005)
- North of Wondering, poetry (Michigan State University Press, 2003)

=== Chapbooks ===
- Deadlifts (Michigan State Press, January 2018) ISBN 1934832634 and ISBN 978-1934832639
- Wreath for the Red Admiral(Lulu.com, June 2016) ISBN 1365120643 and ISBN 978-1365120640
