= Shirley Crowder =

American track and field athlete

Shirley Ann Crowder (born March 22, 1939, in Temple, Georgia) is a retired American track and field athlete, known for running hurdles, though she was credible long jumper. She represented the United States at the 1960 Olympics. She finished a non-qualifying fourth in her heat but in the process beat a 16 year old, future medalist and world record holder Chi Cheng.

While competing for Tennessee A&I State College, she was a three time National Champion in hurdles. She won the 80 meters hurdles at the 1957 and 1959 USA Outdoor Track and Field Championships. The race was not held at the 1958 championships, but she won the 50 yard hurdles Indoor that year.
