= Charles Tidwell =

- Born: February 3, 1921; Lizella, Georgia, U.S.
- Died: May 4, 1990 (Macon, Georgia)
- Cause of death: Complications from diabetes

Charles Tidwell (February 3, 1921 – May 4, 1990) was an American race car driver, best known for his career driving stock cars in the NASCAR, GASCAR (Georgia Association of Stock Car Automobile Racing), and MARC (now ARCA) circuits. His racing career lasted from 1948 to 1959. Tidwell set track records at Albany, Georgia and Macon, Georgia during his career.

Tidwell was likely the first NASCAR driver to have a personal human mascot; "Little Willie" Leonard, an African American small person whom he befriended in spite of the racial prejudices that existed during the time. Little Willie traveled the racing circuit with Tidwell and danced in front of the grandstands for the crowd.

"The Flying B", as he was called by his opponents, raced with such greats as Fonty Flock, Tim Flock, Bob Flock, and, Lee Petty, Buck Baker, Junior Johnson, Fireball Roberts, and Nero Steptoe (aka "The Wild Indian). He also raced against the first woman racecar driver to compete against men in the state of Georgia, Ethel Flock Mobley, who was the sister of the Flock brothers. Tidwell lost his hearing during his racing career and was very likely the first totally deaf racecar driver.

Tidwell first married Mildred Smith and together they had two daughters, Sandra Tidwell and Charlotte Mae Tidwell. They later divorced and in 1963 he married LaTrelle Russ and they had one daughter, Angela "Connie" Tidwell. Charles Tidwell died in 1990 from complications related to diabetes. His daughter, Angela "Connie" Tidwell Frady, is the owner of his legacy. Charles Tidwell is buried at Macon Memorial Park Cemetery in Macon, Georgia.

== Early life ==
Charles Tidwell was the son of Lillie Mae Clark Tidwell and Charlie Clifton Tidwell. He was born in Crawford County (Lizella), Georgia and raised in Macon, Georgia. He was the eldest of three sons. His siblings were, Billy L. Tidwell, who also raced cars, and Jesse B. "Pop" Tidwell.

Tidwell attended Virgil Powers Elementary School and Lanier High School in Macon, Georgia. He joined the Army just before WWII started. He was a sergeant and served on the front lines in France, Germany, and Austria. He was in the infantry and tank division. He was injured when he was struck with shrapnel. He eventually had to have his left pinky finger amputated due to the injury. Tidwell was awarded the Bronze Star Medal for his service.

At the end of World War II, Tidwell drove a tank in a parade at Columbus, Georgia, escorting General George S. Patton.

After the war, Tidwell owned Tidwell's Used Cars on Broadway in Macon, Georgia with his father, Charlie Tidwell. He also owned a service station at one time. He owned the T&T Garage at 4007 Broadway in Macon, Georgia until his retirement in 1977.

Tidwell also enjoyed riding motorcycles and was a licensed pilot.

== Racing career ==
Tidwell raced on dirt tracks all over the southeastern United States from 1948 to 1959, owning a small track at one time in Talladega, Alabama. He drove with a cigar clenched between his teeth, once swallowing a burning cigar when he was in an accident and was hanging out of the door of his car.

Tidwell's hometown was Macon, Georgia, where he entered many races at the Central City Park racetrack. He was also on the board of governors with GASCAR.

Tidwell's main car number was "6". He chose this number because his home was at 6 Dessau Place in Macon, Georgia. The names of some of his racecars were "The Flying B", "The Dutchess" (his nickname for his first wife, Mildred Smith Tidwell), "Flying Saucer, and "Ali Khan". He built many of his own cars and mixed his own fuel formulas.

According to the Macon newspaper, Tidwell was rated as the top driver on the Strictly Stock circuit in the southeast and in his home state, Georgia. During his third year of racing, he won 34 track victories in one year, which was a mark no other Georgia driver could equal. He also held the title of Southeastern Champion for eight years. The Macon Telegraph had this to say about Tidwell, "This young blond fellow is completely fearless and has the grit and determination that sets him apart everywhere he goes. He is both a demon on his motorcycle and in his racecar."

In June 1949, Tidwell set a track record at Central City Park Speedway at a speed of 32.2 seconds, and he also set a track record at the Albany, Georgia speedway for 31.2 seconds in 1952.

Tidwell raced at the first annual race held at the Darlington Raceway in Darlington, South Carolina. During that race, he drove an Oldsmobile 88, number 102, called the Heart of Georgia Special. He also raced at Daytona, Florida when the races were still being held right on the beach.

Due to popular demand, Tidwell and his rival, Barney Smith were matched to compete in a special 5-lap winner take all race, held September 11, 1949 at Central City Park Speedway in Macon, Georgia. The race was listed as a special feature event. Tidwell took the checkered flag for the victory in front of a crowd of 5,000.

Tidwell once participated in an added attraction at the Warner Robins, Georgia track, ran by the Warner Robins Civil Air Patrol, in which he raced six laps against a Cub airplane, flown by licensed pilot, Clive Hyatt of the Warner Robins Civil Air Patrol. Hyatt kept his wing tip almost right on top of Tidwell's car the whole race and would get ahead of Tidwell at the back leg of the track when the wind was at his back. Tidwell was the winner of the race.

A few years after he lost his hearing, Tidwell retired from racing in 1959.

Later in years, Tidwell said that the only place he ever wanted to race and never did was Indianapolis, Indiana.

Tidwell's racing memorabilia was on display at the International Motorsports Hall of Fame in Talladega, Alabama for ten years and now may be seen at the Georgia Sports Hall of Fame in Macon, Georgia.
