= Lillian Greene-Chamberlain =

American sprinter

Lillian Greene-Chamberlain (born 1941) is an American educator and former track and field athlete.

Since she began running at the age of 16 in 1957. She received the first women's athletic scholarship to the Colorado State Rams track and field team, establishing the women's track team and becoming the first African-American female athlete in school history. A scholarship fund was later founded under her name.

She was the first U.S. national champion in the 440-yard run indoors, the first African-American woman to represent the U.S. in the 400m and 800m in international competitions, a three-time U.S. national champion and American record holder, a Pan American Games champion, and a three-time U.S. All-American national team member.

In 2007, she was named one of the 100 Most Influential Sports Educators in America by Business Wire. She served on the President's Council on Physical Fitness and Sports from 2006 to 2008. She is also a former Women's Sports Foundation trustee.
