= Irene Robertson =

American hurdler (1931–1994)

Personal information
- Nationality: American
- Born: November 10, 1931
- Died: October 28, 1994 (aged 62)

Sport
- Sport: Track and field
- Event: 80 metres hurdles

Irene Robertson (November 10, 1931 – October 28, 1994) was an American hurdler. She competed in the 80 metres hurdles at the 1956 Summer Olympics and the 1960 Summer Olympics.
