= Jerome Carter (athlete) =

American high jumper

Medal record

Men's Athletics

Representing the United States

Pan American Games
Bronze medal – third place	1987 Indianapolis	High Jump

Jerome Carter (born March 25, 1963) is an American retired high jumper.

He won the bronze medal at the 1987 Pan American Games. He competed at the 1987 World Championships without reaching the final. He set the American Record in the high jump with a personal best of 2.37 meters (7' 9 1/2") in May 1988.

His personal best jump is 2.37 metres, achieved in May 1988 in Columbus, Ohio.
