= Lynda Sutfin =

American javelin thrower (born 1962)

Personal information
- Full name: Lynda Kay Hughes Sutfin
- Nationality: American
- Born: October 6, 1962 (age 64) Los Angeles, California, United States
- Height: 5 ft 7 in (1.71 m)

Sport
- Event: Javelin throw
Medal record
Women's athletics
Representing United States
Pan American Junior Championships
| Gold medal – first place | 1980 Sudbury | Javelin throw |

Lynda Kay Hughes Sutfin (born October 6, 1962) is an American athlete. She competed in the women's javelin throw at the 1984 Summer Olympics and the 1988 Summer Olympics.
