= John Lawlor (athlete) =

Irish athlete

Personal information
- Nationality: Irish
- Born: 14 March 1934 Dublin, Ireland
- Died: 20 May 2018 (aged 84) Milton, Massachusetts, United States
- Height: 188 cm (6 ft 2 in)
- Weight: 93 kg (205 lb)

Sport
- Sport: Athletics
- Event: Hammer throw
- Club: Civil Service AC; Boston University Terriers
Medal record
Representing Ireland
Summer Universiade
Bronze medal – third place	1961 Sofia	Hammer throw

John Francis Lawlor (14 March 1934 – 20 May 2018) was an Irish athlete in track and field who competed at the 1960 Summer Olympics.

== Biography ==
Lawlor attended St. Joseph's Secondary C.B.S. in Fairview, Dublin and played rugby and Gaelic football as a youth. he joined the Garda Síochána in 1953 and took up hammer throwing. As a member of the Civil Service AC he won the 1953 Irish title, while continuing to play rugby for the Irish Wolfhounds.

Lawlor accepted a track and field scholarship at Boston University where he would study geology. While a student at Boston University, he won the NCAA Championships in the hammer throw in 1959 and 1960, setting meet records both times (207-5/63.22 in 1959 and 209-2/63.76 in 1960).

Lawlor finished third behind Mike Ellis (athlete) in the hammer throw event at the 1958 AAA Championships and competed in the 1960 Olympics in Rome, finishing fourth in the men's hammer throw in 1960 with a throw of 64.95 metres (213.1 ft).

Lawlor won the British AAA Championships title at the 1961 AAA Championships.

Lawlor returned to Ireland in 1963 to work as a geologist at Silvermines and the following year in 1964 at his second Olympics in Tokyo, he finished 23rd in the qualifying round. In 1970, he returned to Boston to gain a Ph.D. in geology and would reside in Milton, Massachusetts thereafter.
