= Ira Davis (athlete) =

American triple jumper

Ira Sylvester Davis (born September 25, 1936, in Philadelphia, Pennsylvania) is a retired American triple jumper. He represented the United States at three Olympics; 1956, 1960 and 1964. He made the finals each time, his best showing was fourth place in 1960, missing a bronze medal by 2 cm. He was the winner of the Olympic Trials each time, setting the Trials record in 1956 and twice in 1960. 1956 was also the American record, set as a 19-year-old college freshman. He was a four time National Champion, winning in 1958-60 and again in 1964.

Davis competed for Overbrook High School where he was a teammate of Wilt Chamberlain on both the basketball and track teams; and La Salle University. Davis was also a credible sprinter, winning the 100-yard dash at the IC4A Championships and the Penn Relays in 1958.

Davis was a 1956 initiate of the Delta Eta chapter of Kappa Alpha Psi fraternity.

1983 Davis (age 46) jumped to a Masters M45 Triple Jump World Indoor Record and winning the Masters National Indoor Championship.
