= Pamela Kurrell =

American discus thrower (1939–2016)

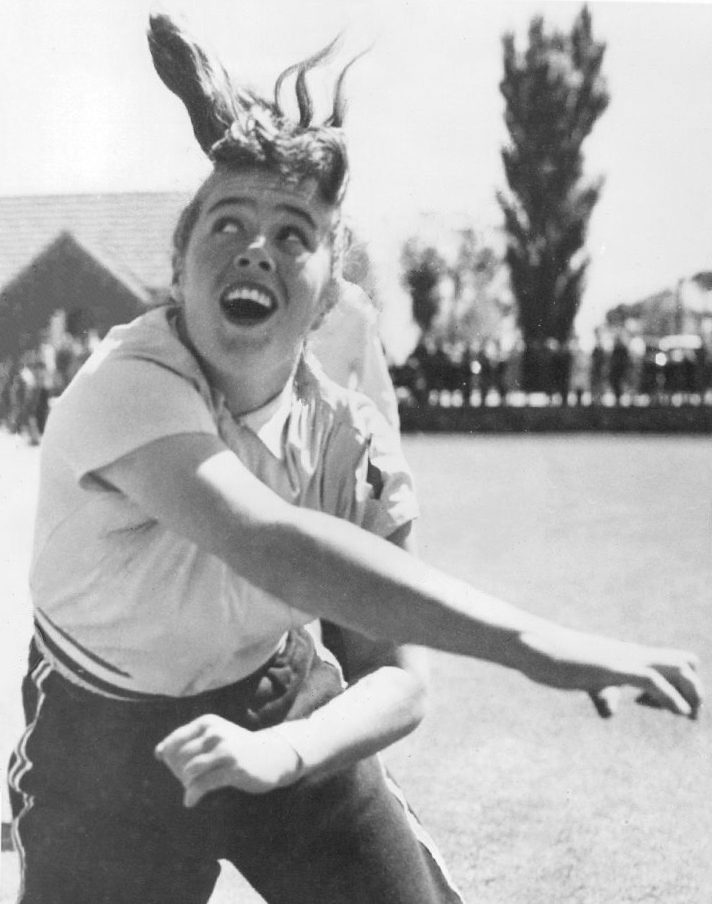
- Kurrell at the 1956 Olympics

Personal information
- Born: January 6, 1939 San Francisco, California, U.S.
- Died: June 14, 2016 (aged 77) Pacifica, California, U.S.
- Education: City College of San Francisco
- Height: 153 cm (5 ft 0 in)
- Weight: 63 kg (139 lb)

Sport
- Sport: Athletics
- Event: Discus throw
- Club: Laurel Track Club

Achievements and titles
- Personal best: 48.51 m (1960)
Medal record
Representing the United States
Pan American Games
Silver medal – second place	1959 Chicago	Discus throw

Pamela Joan "Pam" Kurrell-Ascariz (January 6, 1939 – June 14, 2016) was an American discus thrower. She competed at 1956 and 1960 Summer Olympics and finished 18–19th. At the Pan American Games she won a silver medal in 1959, placing eighth in 1955.
