= Phil Coleman (athlete) =

American steeplechase runner (1931–2021)

Personal information
- Full name: Philip Yates Coleman
- Born: July 10, 1931 Champaign, Illinois, U.S.
- Died: July 25, 2021 (aged 90)
Medal record
Men's athletics
Representing the United States
Pan American Games
Gold medal – first place	1959 Chicago	3000 m steeplechase

Philip Yates Coleman (July 10, 1931 – July 25, 2021) was an American middle- and long-distance runner from the United States. He was born in Champaign, Illinois. He won the gold medal in the men's 3000 metres steeplechase event at the 1959 Pan American Games. Coleman attended Southern Illinois University (1948 - 1952, spent two years in the Army (where he developed as a steeplechaser, teaching himself to hurdle) and becoming inter service steeplechase champion . He attended graduate school at the University of Illinois (1954 – 1964), meanwhile competing for The University of Chicago Track Club. He was a member of the 1956 and 1960 Olympic teams. He retired from running in 1960, wrote an article for Sports Illustrated "Idea of an Amateur", 1962, for which he was awarded the Mohammed Taher trophy by the International Olympic committee. With his thesis, "Mark Twain's Desperate Naturalism" completed, he received a PhD in Literature in 1964. He taught literature and served as dean at California University of Pennsylvania, retiring in 1998.

== Personal bests ==
- 1500 metres – 3:47.6 (1960)
- Mile – 4:03.8 (1960)
- 2 miles – 8:48.0 (1956)
- Steeplechase – 8:40.8 (1958)
- 5000 metres – 14:23.1 (1960)
