= Memorial Stadium (Bakersfield) =

Stadium in Bakersfield, California

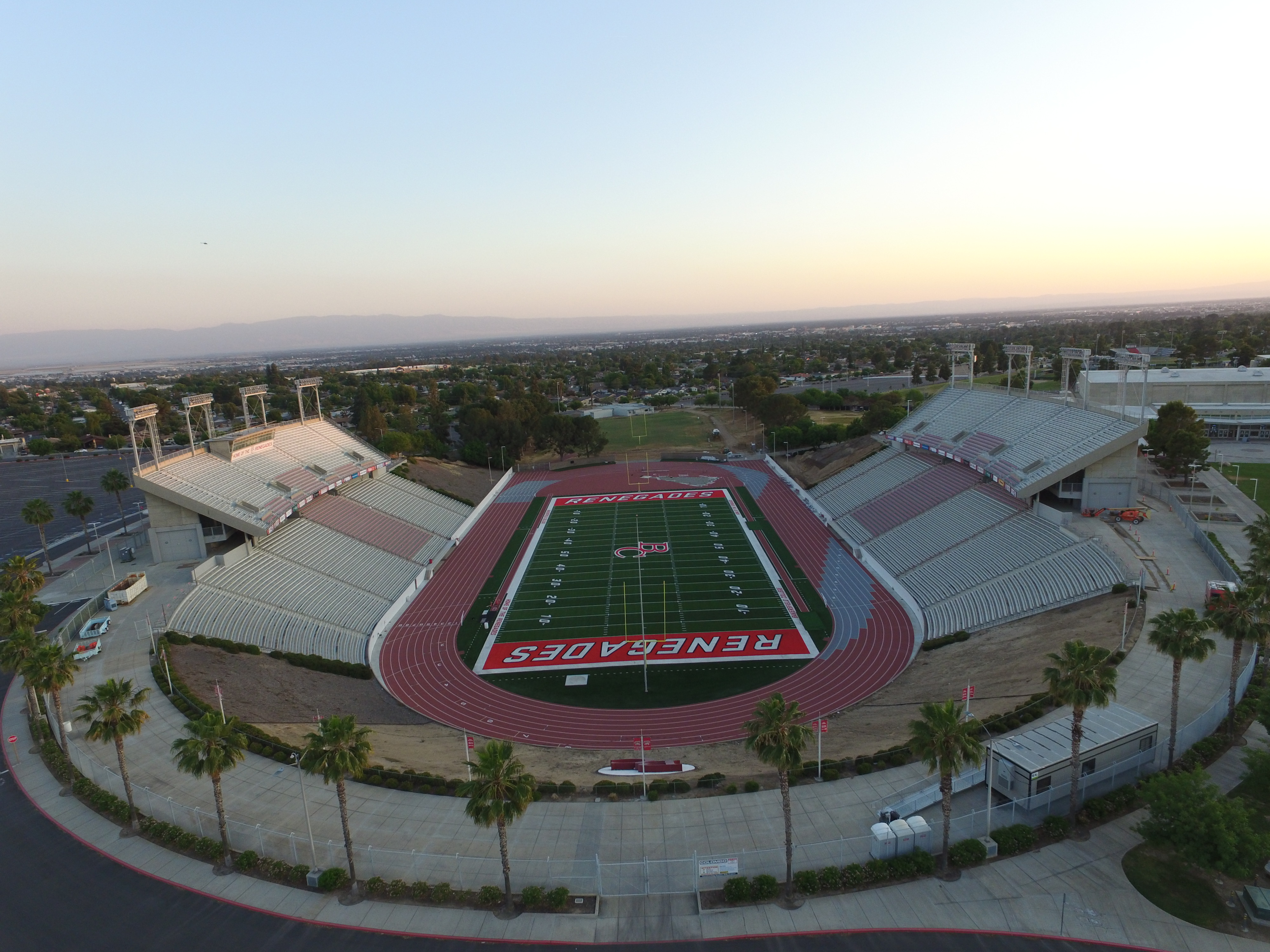
- Aerial view from northeast in 2020

- Location in the United States Location in California
- Interactive map of Memorial Stadium
- Address: 1801 Panorama Dr. -
- Location: Bakersfield College; Bakersfield, California
- Coordinates: 35°24′26″N 118°58′10″W
- Elevation: 680 feet (210 m)
- Owner: Bakersfield College
- Operator: Bakersfield College
- Capacity: 19,468 plus about 4,000 standing room only
- Surface: FieldTurf (Installed 2019)

Construction
- Opened: 1955; 71 years ago
- Renovated: 1999
- Cost: $1.161 million

Tenant
- Bakersfield College Renegades (1955-present)

Memorial Stadium is a double-decked concrete and steel stadium in the western United States, located in northeast Bakersfield, California, near the scenic Panorama Bluffs, which overlook the prolific Kern River Oil Field. In July 2019, an artificial playing surface was installed replacing the worn out and troublesome Bermuda grass field which was susceptible to fungus growth. An all-weather track was also installed In 2020 a new scoreboard and sound system were installed along with new L.E.D. lights placed upon the original light standards.

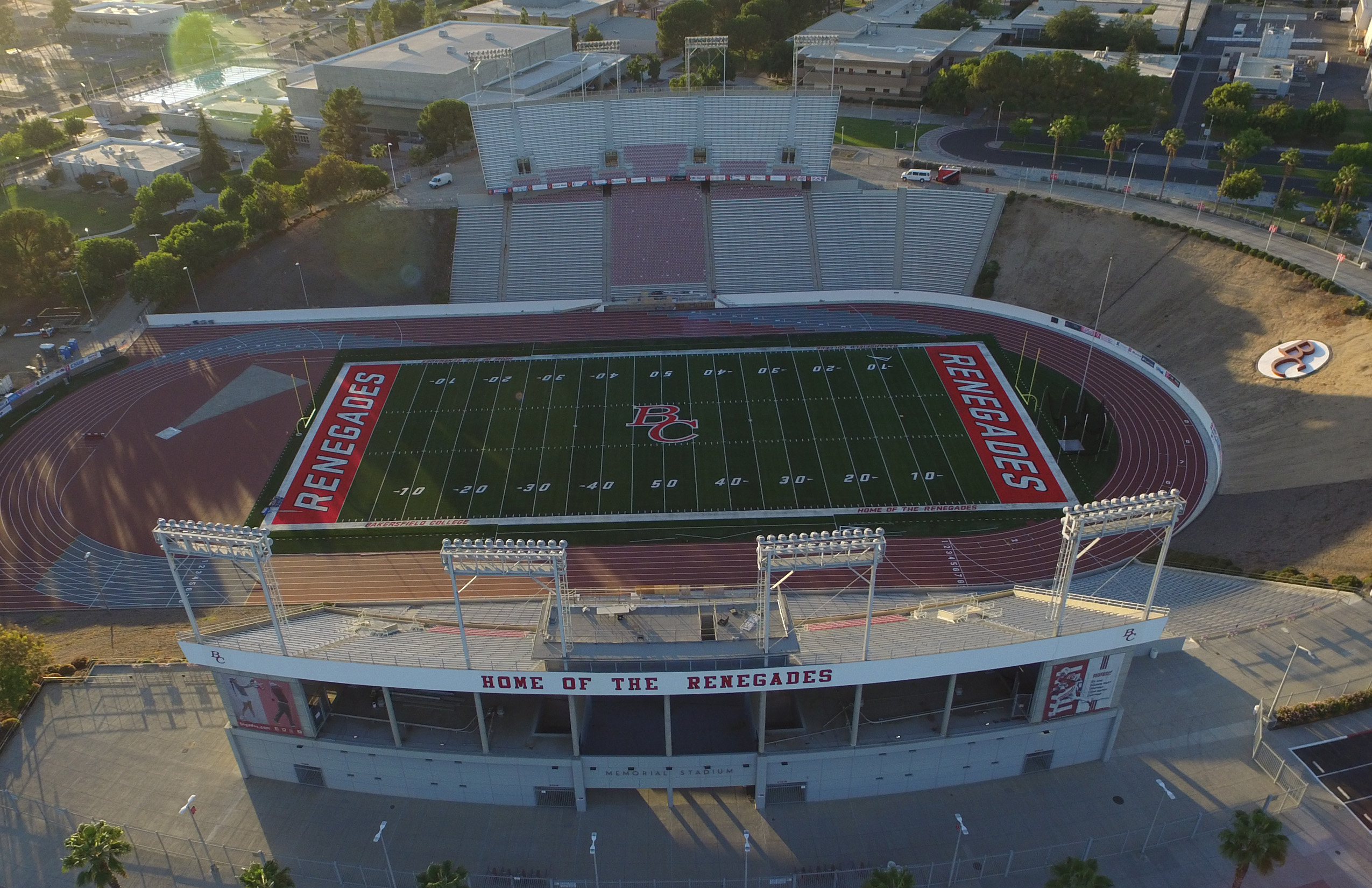
Bakersfield College - Memorial Stadium at dusk

Located at the corner of University Avenue and Mount Vernon Avenue on the campus of Bakersfield College (BC), it is primarily used for American football, and is the home field of the B.C. Renegades. The stadium currently seats 19,468 people but has plenty of standing room which can accommodate close to 24,000 people. When Memorial Stadium was opened in 1955 it originally seated 16,500. It is named to honor the war dead of World War I and World War II. On December 14, 2019, Memorial Stadium hosted the CCCAA California Junior College Football Title Game.

== History ==
Memorial Stadium was completed in 1955 before the remainder of the campus opened for students in 1956 when Bakersfield College moved from its original location on the downtown campus of Bakersfield High School, where it was founded in 1913, to the new campus in Northeast Bakersfield. Bakersfield College is the second-oldest junior college in California behind Santa Barbara City College. Ad hoc football squads were first created in the 1920s resulting in the moniker nickname "Renegades" before official interscholastic collegiate competition was started. Memorial Stadium was the first structure to be completed at the new campus site. Football games were being played on site before classes were ever held on the new campus. In fact, during the first semester of classes students were served lunches out of the concession stands because the cafeteria was still under construction.

For its first 40 years, Memorial Stadium enjoyed huge success based on its attendance of Bakersfield College football games by the local community. Lasting into the early 1990s, it was unusual for a B.C. football game not to have 12,000 fans or more in the stands. Games have been locally televised live and on tape-delay in the past. Attendance was so large that the college's academic extracurricular activities were all funded by football ticket sales until the 1990s.

The stadium was the home to the first ever junior college bowl game, and California's formerly most prestigious junior college bowl game, the Kern County Shrine Club Potato Bowl. The Potato Bowl, established in 1948, was a fund raiser for the Shriners Hospital for Burned and Crippled Children in Los Angeles.

The Potato Bowl no longer exists due to fees demanded by the State Junior College Commission on Athletics (COA) to be a part of the reformed state JC playoff system (The COA is now known as the California Community College Athletic Association or CCCAA). {Note: The Kern County Shrine Club now hosts a youth football version of the Potato Bowl with Golden Empire Youth Football to raise money for the Shriner's Hospital now located in Pasadena}. The J.C. Potato Bowl hence was replaced by the Golden Empire Bowl, which was part of the California J.C. Football State Playoffs, and was supported and sponsored by local businesses.

However, the Golden Empire Bowl folded in 2011. Sponsors cited a lack of ticket money for previous bowl games that left them losing money. These sponsors were hoping to break-even with their sponsorship every year as a way to serve their community.

The stadium would occasionally hosts B.C.'s soccer games on its pitch prior to the installation of the artificial surface. Professional and international teams have also played in exhibitions (friendly's). However, due to the layout of the field within the track the field's length and width were smaller than your typical soccer field. Soccer games are played on a large grass field on the western side of the campus with plans to build a soccer-specific venue in the coming years in what is now the southern parking lot.

Memorial Stadium hosted the 2012 CCCAA state football title game where Bakersfield College defeated City College of San Francisco in front of a crowd of over 16,000.

Memorial Stadium has had numerous Renegade football games exceed attendances of 20,000, particularly in post-season games with a national title or state title berth at stake. The largest ever crowd, however, was 23,701 for a high school football game between Bakersfield High School and Bishop Amat Memorial High School from La Puente on Saturday, October 1, 1994. Bishop Amat, with a #1 national ranking, won 34-3. Memorial Stadium features an all weather track that was completely replaced in July 2019. It hosts high school and junior college track events. The track was once the training track for the Soviet Union track teams when they visited the United States. It also was the track on which Jim Ryun established a world-record in the one-mile run in 1967 when the track surface was made of crushed brick. This world record run was featured on ABC's Wide World of Sports. The track has hosted A.A.U. events and state championship high school meets.

Memorial Stadium occasionally hosts high school football games. Until the early 1990s, it was the Friday night home field of both Highland High School and East Bakersfield High School on alternating weekends. Changes by B.C.'s college president increased the field usage fees in the mid-1990s which led both schools to finally install lights on their own fields after decades of renting Memorial Stadium. Presently, Memorial Stadium is used for high school football games only when it is deemed that an existing high school field is too small to handle the anticipated large crowds; this generally occurs only during playoffs.

On Friday, August 29, 2014, Memorial Stadium hosted two high school games billed as the Kick Off Classic. Local schools Ridgeview and Frontier played in the first game with Ridgeview winning 42-21. The featured second game pitted Southern California power Oaks Christian from Westlake Village (ranked #19 in California) against perennial Central Section power and defending State Division 1 champion Bakersfield High (ranked #11 in California) won by Bakersfield 34-21. Memorial Stadium has hosted a high school event like this before in the mid-1990s. A series was created featuring the top three high schools from Bakersfield and the Fresno area. An annual triple header was played twice at Memorial Stadium and once in Clovis at Lamonica Stadium before interest waned after three seasons. This series featured Bakersfield High, Foothill High, and West High from Bakersfield against the Fresno-area schools Clovis High, Clovis West High, and Buchanan High.

On January 7, 2017, Memorial Stadium hosted an outdoor professional hockey game. The Bakersfield Condors (American Hockey League affiliate of the National Hockey League's Edmonton Oilers) presented the Condorstown Outdoor Classic. The Bakersfield Condors hosted the Ontario Reign (American Hockey League affiliate of the Los Angeles Kings) in a game played in a pouring rain storm. The Condors won in Overtime. The game was preceded the previous day by an All-Star game featuring various celebrities and NHL hockey legends which had teams coached by Wayne Gretzky and Luc Robitaille. In the days leading up to the event the temporary rink hosted public skating sessions and stick-time hockey games for the public.

== Facilities ==
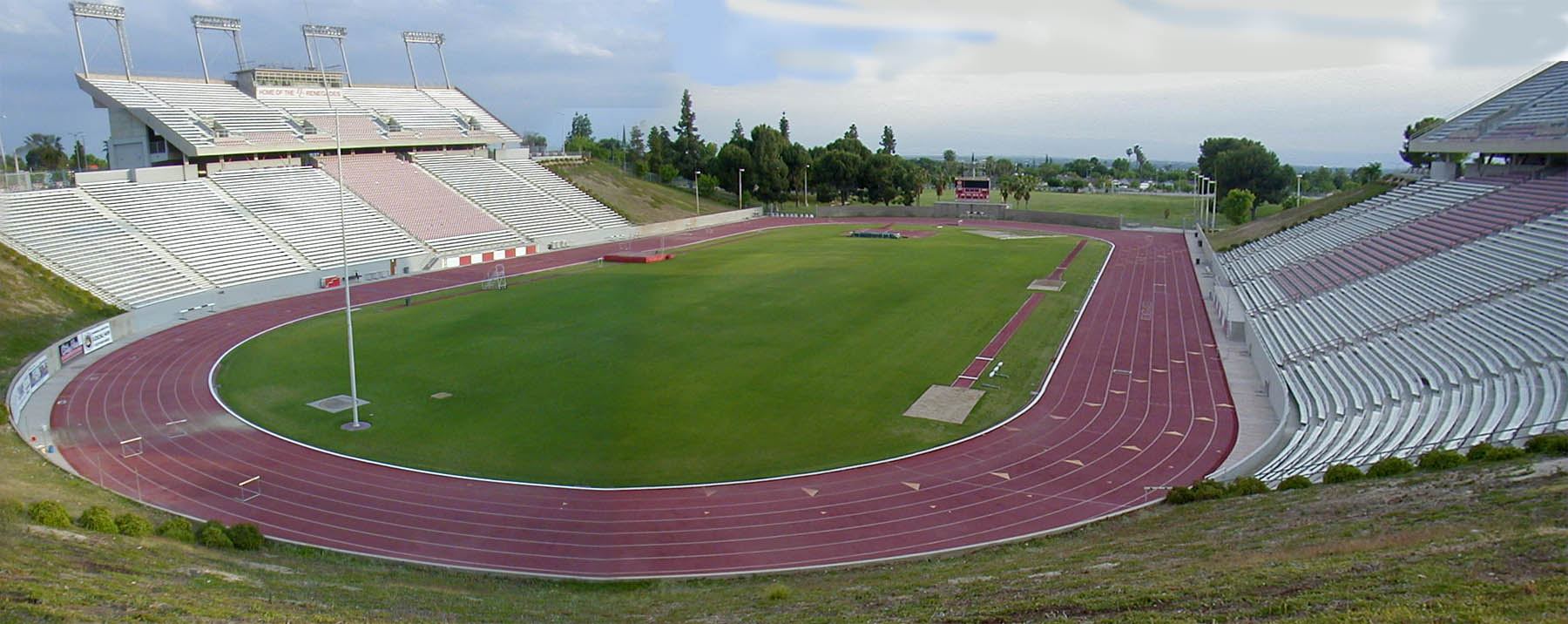
Bakersfield Memorial Stadium bowl

The stadium structure was retrofitted and overhauled in the late 1990s. All seats are reserved and are either aluminum benches with backs, or bucket style seats with arm rests. The lower half of the stadium, which was built into a pre-existing ravine, is enclosed with a horseshoe-shaped open end that faces to the southwest and offers views of downtown Bakersfield and the southern end of the San Joaquin Valley. Consequently there is a minimal amount of wind on the floor of the stadium that interferes with events and the acceptance of records as the prevailing northwesterly winds blow over the nearby bluffs and above the track and field surface.

Consequently, winds very seldom affect games or track events. The field is so shielded from the prevailing wind that people who are often very warm or hot on the field will get a noticeable chill when they move to the top of the upper deck or on the roof of the press box. The upper decks are built of steel-reinforced concrete and sit opposite each other overlooking their respective sidelines. On top of each upper deck are four light standards with new (2020) L.E.D. lighting systems. The visiting-side (eastern) upper deck features an enclosed, partitioned press box with rooms for each team's coaching staff, radio broadcasts, and media.

Teams dress in the nearby Dr. Romain Clerou Field House, located up the hill from the field next to the gym and swimming pool complex. The field house contains B.C.'s practice and game locker room and offers an adjacent locker room for a visiting team with showers. Visiting teams now use the women's locker room on the north side of the gymnasium to dress.

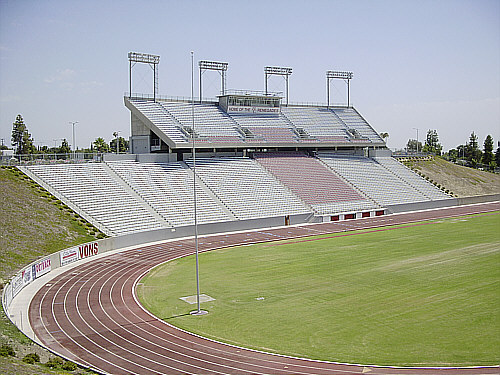
Bakersfield Memorial Stadium

The field and stadium are unusual in that it is not on a traditional north-south axis from goal post to goal post. Due to being built into a pre-existing ravine the axis of the field runs at an approximate northeast-southwest angle. The northeast end of the stadium is closed into the top of the ravine which was filled in to build a parking lot with a concourse connecting each side of the stadium. Most football fields are built on a north-south axis with the press box on the western sideline so that the press box is not looking into the setting sun.

The press box was built on this side so that it would overlook the track's finish line which could only be built on the eastern side of the stadium due to the closed end on the north end of the stadium. If the finish line was on the western side then it would be out of view of most of the spectators and the press box would have an indirect angle of observation. Because of this emphasis on track and field the scoreboard operator was positioned at the finish line on the field near the northern 30-yard line until 2020 when the scoreboard operation system was finally moved into the press box in 2020, the last remaining junior college site in California to do so. Another quirk due to the odd angle of the stadium is the naming of the two seating areas. The campus side of the stadium is officially called the northern side and the Mt. Vernon Avenue side is called the southern side.

Most people refer to the campus side as the western side and the Mt. Vernon Avenue side as the eastern side. Because the stadium was built prior to the Americans With Disabilities Act there are no elevators or escalators. It is 64 steps from the bottom row to the top row of the lower deck.

The press box is partitioned into two coaches booths, the George Pavletich Memorial Radio Booth named for longtime KERN-1410 AM radio play-by-play announcer George Pavletich, and the P.A. Announcer's booth. Carl Bryan has just completed his 34th year as P.A. Announcer for Renegade Football. His spotters, Chuck Cunningham and Norman Ranallo, have worked with Carl for 33 and 32 years, respectively. A total of 99 seasons between the three of them. The main room is sectioned into an upper and lower seating area for media. The roof of the press box is used to film games from, has been used to broadcast live local television coverage of B.C. football games from, and used to broadcast live internet webcasts by visiting teams.

Adjacent to Memorial Stadium's playing surface, just beyond the open end, is a 100-yard (91 m) long practice natural grass & lighted field where the football team holds its practices. The practice field has also hosted football clinics, Bakersfield Blitz football practices, Native American pow-wows, and carnivals.

A campus renovation is in progress as of 2019 that will see a gymnasium built adjacent to the campus-side seating of Memorial Stadium. This will allow teams to dress at field level without having to walk up-and-down a steep concrete ramp in their plastic cleats resulting in many players over the years slipping and falling. This new facility will be started in 2020 and is scheduled to be completed in 2022. The current gymnasium, the Gil Bishop Sports Center, will be demolished.
