= Diane Williams (sprinter) =

American sprinter (born 1960)

Medal record

Women's athletics

Representing United States

World Championships
Gold medal – first place	1987 Rome	4 × 100 m relay
Bronze medal – third place	1983 Helsinki	100 m

Pan American Games
Silver medal – second place	1987 Indianapolis	100 m

Diane Williams (born 14 December, 1960) is a retired World class sprinter who ran 100 m and 4 × 100 m relays. She was born 14 December 1960 in Chicago, Illinois.

In college, Williams competed for the Cal State Los Angeles Golden Eagles track and field team and the Michigan State Spartans.

== 1980 Olympics ==
Williams qualified for the 1980 U.S. Olympic team but was unable to compete due to the 1980 Summer Olympics boycott. In 2007 she did receive one of 461 Congressional Gold Medals created especially for the spurned athletes.

== World Athletics Championships ==
Her best performances came in the first two World Athletics Championships in 1983 and 1987. In Helsinki in 1983 she was a Bronze medallist over 100 m. In 1987, she was fourth over 100 m and won gold as part of the 4 × 100 relay team, their winning time of 41.58 CBP secs is still one of the fastest in history. In 1988, she was 2nd to Florence Griffith Joyner's world record time of 10.49 in the 100 m.

== Aftermath ==
Diane has admitted to using performance-enhancing drugs during her career in the era preceding random out-of-competition testing. However, she managed to compete without the use of drugs through the 1987 season and ran faster than ever. She now tours schools where she relates her abuse of steroids and the struggle to regain her health in the aftermath of her career. An autobiography, True to Me, was published a few years ago which chronicles the aforementioned battle to perform clean at the highest level.

Height 1.63 m Weight 54 kg.

== Personal bests ==
100 m	10.86 s
200 m	22.60 s
4 × 100 m	Relay 41.55 s U.S. Record

== Sources ==
The International Track and Field Annual 1988/89 ISBN 0-671-69917-2
