= Carol Cady =

American athlete (born 1962)

Personal information
- Full name: Carol Therese Cady
- Born: June 6, 1962 (age 64) Los Alamos, New Mexico, U.S.
- Years active: 1984–1990

Sport
- Country: United States
- Sport: Athletics
- Events: Shot put, Discus throw

Achievements and titles
- Personal bests: 1987 World Championships, Rome, Italy: 13th place, 58.50 m

Carol Therese Cady (born June 6, 1962, in Los Alamos, New Mexico) is an American retired female shot putter and discus thrower. She competed for her native country at two consecutive Summer Olympics, starting in 1984. During the 1980s Cady was one of the first women to compete in hammer throw. Cady was an All-American for the Stanford Cardinal track and field team while a student at Stanford University.

== International competitions ==
Year	Competition	Venue	Position	Notes
Representing the United States
1987	World Championships	Rome, Italy	13th	58.50 m (discus)
