= Earlene Brown =

American athlete (1935–1983)

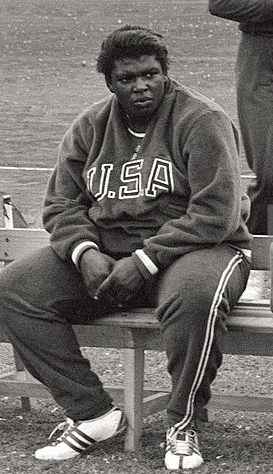
- Earlene Brown at the 1960 Olympics

Personal information
- Born: July 11, 1935 Latexo, Texas, U.S.
- Died: May 21, 1983 (aged 47) Compton, California, U.S.
- Height: 5 ft 9 in (1.75 m)
- Weight: 251 lb (114 kg)

Sport
- Sport: Athletics
- Event(s): Shot put, discus throw
- Club: Spartan Women's Athletic Club; Compton Track Club

Achievements and titles
- Personal best(s): SP – 16.69 m (1960); DT – 53.91 m (1960)
Medal record
Representing the United States
Olympic Games
Bronze medal – third place	1960 Rome	Shot put
Pan American Games
Gold medal – first place	1959 Chicago	Shot put
Gold medal – first place	1959 Chicago	Discus throw

Earlene Brown, née Earlene Dennis (June 11, 1935 – May 1, 1983) was an American athlete notable for her careers in track and field and roller games. She competed at the 1956, 1960 and 1964 Olympics in the shot put and discus throw and won a bronze medal in the shot put in 1960; she finished fourth in the discus in 1956.

== Life ==
Brown was born on July 11, 1935, in Latexo, in Houston County, Texas, a town that, according to Isobel Silden, Earlene could "no longer find on the map" by 1973. Earlene's father was "a 6-footer" and a semipro baseball player in the Negro leagues in Texas. She was an only child. Her parents separated in 1938 and she followed her mother who joined the second Great Migration of Southern African-Americans to California and moved to Los Angeles.

Brown began her participation in track and field activities as a member of LAPD Deputy Auxiliary Police after it was introduced on September 9, 1943, by Mayor Fletcher Bowron. She competed and excelled in the basketball throw, which led up to the shot put. While attending Jordan High School, she was discovered by Adeline Valdez, Josephine Spearman and Clarence Mackey, who tried to get her to turn out for the Helsinki Olympics, but she was then "too busy going to dances".

Brown joined the Amateur Athletic Union (AAU) at 21 in 1956, by which time she was already married to Henry Brown, a bricklayer, and had a baby boy, Reginald, born November 14, 1955. There, she started weight lifting under the tutelage of Des Koch, while America's original javelin technician Steve Seymour coached her in shot and discus. Seeing Brown throw, Seymour was convinced she had potential as a gold medalist and decided to send her to the 1956 Summer Olympics in Melbourne. Since the Browns could not afford to pay for Earlene's training and traveling expenses, Brad Pye Jr., am influential sports editor of the Los Angeles Sentinel and African-American community activist, led a campaign that raised funds to support her. Shortly thereafter, though, Brown and her husband separated and Reggie was left in the care of his grandmother. To support herself, Brown began attending Henrietta's Beauty College to become a hairdresser.

From 1959 on, Brown was associated with the Tennessee State University "Tigerbelles", whose coach Ed Temple was also the head coach of the U.S. Olympic Women's Track and Field Team. Temple spent time "getting Earlene in shape" for the 1960 Games and Earlene then became one of Wilma Rudolph's closest friends. At the 1960 Olympic Games in Rome, Brown won the bronze medal in the women's shot put. In the 1964 Olympic Games in Tokyo, Brown – who was short-sighted and wore heavy glasses as a consequence, except when throwing – was "beset by both wind and rain and lost her footing and a chance to get a toehold on the crown".

"Sports is the greatest thing for any individual to have. Without sports I would have been nothing. I don't see where live would have had any meaning. I must be on this earth for a reason because God has blessed me. He's given me the opportunity to see the world, something even most rich folks are not going to see."

— Earlene Brown

In July 1964, Brown hosted her Soviet shot-put counterparts, Galina Zybina, Tamara Press, and Yevgenia Kuznetsova, for an unsanctioned tour of Los Angeles, although she could not speak Russian. One stop they made was Sportsman's Bowlorama, a bowling alley where Brown was known to bet in winner-take-all bowling matches called "pot bowling", where she introduced the Soviet athletes to the American sport.

In 1965, she retired from shot put competition. The same year she became a skater. As a blocker for the New York Bombers roller derby team, she was dubbed the "Brown Bomber". In 1975, after retiring from all athletic endeavors, she returned to her practice as beautician. She died aged 47, on May 1, 1983, in Compton, California.

== Track and field career ==
Brown was the first American woman to medal in the shot put, one of the only two United States women to place at Rome and the only shot-putter to compete in three consecutive Olympics. She was the only American woman to win a medal in the shot put until Michelle Carter won gold at the 2016 Summer Olympics in Rio. She has been described by Nathan Aaseng as "the most unheralded U.S. athlete of all time". Her events of choice were the shot put and discus throwing. Brown finished in the top ten in the shot put and discus in the 1956 Summer Olympics in Melbourne, Australia, setting American records in both events.

Brown was an eight-time (1956–1962 and 1964) and three-time (1958, 1959 and 1961) national champion in the shot put and discus, respectively. In 1958 she received the #1 world ranking and became the first American to break the 50-foot barrier in the shot put. In 1959 she won gold medals in both the shot put and discus events at the Pan American Games. On December 1, 2005, Brown was posthumously inducted in the National Track and Field Hall of Fame by the USA Track and Field (USATF) during the Jesse Owens Awards and Hall of Fame Induction Ceremony held in Jacksonville, Florida.

== Roller games career ==
After her career in the international track and field community, Brown made her debut in the banked track sport of roller games in 1965. She began her skating career with Roller Games' Texas Outlaws and New York Bombers. At almost 6 feet tall (on skates) and over 250 pounds, Brown quickly became one of the sport's most feared defensive skaters – her signature move being "the bear hug." After a brief retirement, Brown returned to roller games, skating with the World Famous, World Champion Los Angeles Thunderbirds. It was at this juncture that she became known in the sport as "747" because of her size and weight. After the 1975 season, Brown permanently retired from roller games.
