= List of Pan American Games medalists in athletics (men) =

This is the complete list of Pan American Games medalists in men's athletics from 1951 to 2023.

== Events ==
=== 100 metres ===
Games	Gold		Silver		Bronze	
1951	Rafael Fortún; Cuba	10.6	Art Bragg; United States	10.6	Herb McKenley; Jamaica	11.0
1955	Rod Richard; United States	10.3A GR	Mike Agostini; Trinidad and Tobago	10.4A	Willie Williams; United States	10.4A
1959	Ray Norton; United States	10.3w	Mike Agostini; British West Indies	10.4w	Enrique Figuerola; United States	10.5w
1963	Enrique Figuerola; Cuba	10.46	Arquímedes Herrera; Venezuela	10.59	Ira Murchison; United States	10.62
1967	Harry Jerome; Canada	10.27w	Willie Turner; United States	10.27w	Hermes Ramírez; Cuba	10.36w
1971	Don Quarrie; Jamaica	10.29	Lennox Miller; Jamaica	10.32	Del Meriwether; United States	10.34
1975	Silvio Leonard; Cuba	10.15A =GR	Hasely Crawford; Trinidad and Tobago	10.21A	Hermes Ramírez; Cuba	10.34A
1979	Silvio Leonard; Cuba	10.13	Harvey Glance; United States	10.19	Emmit King; United States	10.30
1983	Leandro Peñalver; Cuba	10.06	Sam Graddy; United States	10.18	Osvaldo Lara; Cuba	10.21
1987	Lee McRae; United States	10.26	Ray Stewart; Jamaica	10.27	Juan Núñez; Dominican Republic	10.44
1991	Robson Caetano; Brazil	10.32	Andre Cason; United States	10.35	Jeff Williams; United States	10.48
1995	Glenroy Gilbert; Canada	10.21w	Joel Isasi; Cuba	10.23w	André Domingos; Brazil	10.23w
1999	Bernard Williams; United States	10.08	Freddy Mayola; Cuba	10.10	Claudinei Quirino; Brazil	10.13
2003	Michael Frater; Jamaica	10.21	Mardy Scales; United States	10.22	Anson Henry; Canada	10.30
2007	Churandy Martina; Netherlands Antilles	10.15	Darvis Patton; United States	10.17	Brendan Christian; Antigua and Barbuda	10.26
2011	Lerone Clarke; Jamaica	10.01 SB	Kim Collins; Saint Kitts and Nevis	10.04	Emmanuel Callender; Trinidad and Tobago	10.16
2015	Andre De Grasse; Canada	10.05	Ramon Gittens; Barbados	10.07	Antoine Adams; Saint Kitts and Nevis	10.09
2019	Mike Rodgers; United States	10.09	Paulo André de Oliveira; Brazil	10.16	Cejhae Greene; Antigua and Barbuda	10.23
2023	José González; Dominican Republic	10.30	Felipe Bardi; Brazil	10.31 (.302)	Emanuel Archibald; Guyana	10.31 (.310)

=== 200 metres ===
Games	Gold		Silver		Bronze	
1951	Rafael Fortún; Cuba	21.3	Art Bragg; United States	21.4	Herb McKenley; Jamaica	21.5
1955	Rod Richard; United States	20.94A	Charles Thomas; United States	21.42A	José da Conceição; Brazil; Mike Agostini; Trinidad and Tobago	21.66A; 21.67A
1959	Ray Norton; United States	20.6w	Les Carney; United States	21.1w	Mike Agostini; British West Indies	21.1w
1963	Rafael Romero; Venezuela	21.23	Ollan Cassell; United States	21.23	Arquímedes Herrera; Venezuela	21.23
1967	John Carlos; United States	20.5	Jerry Bright; United States	20.9	Pablo Montes; Cuba	21.0
1971	Don Quarrie; Jamaica	19.86	Marshall Dill; United States	20.39	Edwin Roberts; Trinidad and Tobago	20.39
1975	James Gilkes; Guyana	20.43A	Larry Brown; United States	20.69A	Mike Sands; Bahamas	20.98A
1979	Silvio Leonard; Cuba	20.37w	James Gilkes; Guyana	20.46w	Don Coleman; United States	20.56w
1983	Elliott Quow; United States	20.42	Leandro Peñalver; Cuba	20.53	Bernie Jackson; United States	20.81
1987	Floyd Heard; United States	20.25	Robson Caetano; Brazil	20.49	Wallace Spearmon; United States	20.53
1991	Robson Caetano; Brazil	20.15	Kevin Little; United States	20.63	Félix Stevens; Cuba	20.76
1995	Iván García; Cuba	20.29	Andrew Tynes; Bahamas	20.33	Sebastián Keitel; Chile	20.55
1999	Claudinei Quirino; Brazil	20.30	Curtis Perry; United States	20.58	Sebastián Keitel; Chile	20.82
2003	Kenny Brokenburr; United States	20.42	Christopher Williams; Jamaica	20.54	André Domingos; Brazil	20.68
2007	Brendan Christian; Antigua and Barbuda	20.37	Marvin Anderson; Jamaica	20.38	Rubin Williams; United States	20.57
2011	Roberto Skyers; Cuba	20.37	Lansford Spence; Jamaica	20.38	Bruno de Barros; Brazil	20.45
2015	Andre De Grasse; Canada	19.88 PB	Rasheed Dwyer; Jamaica	19.90	Alonso Edward; Panama	19.90 SB
2019	Álex Quiñónez; Ecuador	20.27	Jereem Richards; Trinidad and Tobago	20.38	Yancarlos Martínez; Dominican Republic	20.44
2023	Renan Gallina; Brazil	20.37	José González; Dominican Republic	20.56	Nadale Buntin; Saint Kitts and Nevis	20.79

=== 400 metres ===
Games	Gold		Silver		Bronze	
1951	Mal Whitfield; United States	47.8	Hugo Maiocco; United States	48	Herb McKenley; Jamaica	48.2
1955	Lou Jones; United States	45.68A	Jim Lea; United States	45.78A	Jesse Mashburn; United States	46.44A
1959	George Kerr; British West Indies	46.1	Basil Ince; British West Indies	46.4	Mal Spence; British West Indies	46.6
1963	James Johnson; United States	46.80	Mel Spence; Jamaica	46.94	Clifton Bertrand; Trinidad and Tobago	47.43
1967	Lee Evans; United States	44.95	Vince Matthews; United States	45.13	Don Domansky; Canada	45.80
1971	John Smith; United States	44.60	Fred Newhouse; United States	45.09	Fernando Acevedo; Peru	45.30 NR
1975	Ronnie Ray; United States	44.45A	Alberto Juantorena; Cuba	44.80A	Delmo da Silva; Brazil	45.53A
1979	Tony Darden; United States	45.11	Alberto Juantorena; Cuba	45.24	Willie Smith; United States	45.3
1983	Cliff Wiley; United States	45.02	Lázaro Martínez; Cuba	45.37	Gérson de Souza; Brazil	45.45
1987	Raymond Pierre; United States	44.60	Bert Cameron; Jamaica	44.72	Roberto Hernández; Cuba	45.13
1991	Roberto Hernández; Cuba	44.52	Ian Morris; Trinidad and Tobago	45.24	Jeff Reynolds; United States	45.81
1995	Norberto Téllez; Cuba	45.38	Omar Mena; Cuba	45.64	Eswort Coombs; Saint Vincent and the Grenadines	45.68
1999	Greg Haughton; Jamaica	44.59	Danny McCray; United States	44.83	Alejandro Cárdenas; Mexico	44.92
2003	Mitch Potter; United States	45.11	Yeimer López; Cuba	45.13	Alleyne Francique; Grenada	45.51
2007	Chris Brown; Bahamas	44.85	Tyler Christopher; Canada	45.05	Chris Lloyd; Dominica	45.40
2011	Nery Brenes; Costa Rica	44.65 NR	Luguelín Santos; Dominican Republic	44.71 NR	Ramon Miller; Bahamas	45.01 SB
2015	Luguelín Santos; Dominican Republic	44.56 SB	Machel Cedenio; Trinidad and Tobago	44.70	Kyle Clemons; United States	44.84 PB
2019	Anthony Zambrano; Colombia	44.83	Demish Gaye; Jamaica	44.94	Justin Robinson; United States	45.07
2023	Lucas Conceição; Brazil	45.77	Luis Avilés; Mexico	45.97	Martín Kouyoumdjian; Chile	46.58

=== 800 metres ===
Games	Gold		Silver		Bronze	
1951	Mal Whitfield; United States	1:53.2	Bill Brown; United States	1:53.3	Hugo Maiocco; United States	1:53.6
1955	Arnie Sowell; United States	1:49.86A	Lonnie Spurrier; United States	1:50.51A	Ramón Sandoval; Chile	1:52.52A
1959	Tom Murphy; United States	1:49.4	George Kerr; British West Indies	1:49.4	Tony Seth; Guyana	1:49.7
1963	Don Bertoia; Canada	1:48.46	Sig Ohlemann; Canada	1:48.63	Ernie Cunliffe; United States	1:48.92
1967	Wade Bell; United States	1:49.20	Bill Crothers; Canada	1:49.91	Brian MacLaren; Canada	1:50.31
1971	Ken Swenson; United States	1:48.08	Art Sandison; United States	1:48.42	Byron Dyce; Jamaica	1:48.42
1975	Luis Medina; Cuba	1:47.98A	Leandro Civil; Cuba	1:48.75A	Carlos Martínez; Mexico	1:48.78A
1979	James Robinson; United States	1:46.3a	Alberto Juantorena; Cuba	1:46.4a	Agberto Guimarães; Brazil	1:46.8a
1983	Agberto Guimarães; Brazil	1:46.31	José Luíz Barbosa; Brazil	1:46.65	Stanley Redwine; United States	1:47.26
1987	Johnny Gray; United States	1:46.79	José Luíz Barbosa; Brazil	1:47.37	Stanley Redwine; United States	1:47.73
1991	Ocky Clark; United States	1:46.91	Terril Davis; United States	1:46.99	Tommy Asinga; Suriname	1:47.24
1995	José Luíz Barbosa; Brazil	1:46.02	Alain Miranda; Cuba	1:46.88	Brad Sumner; United States	1:47.58
1999	Johnny Gray; United States	1:45.38	Norberto Téllez; Cuba	1:45.40	Zach Whitmarsh; Canada	1:45.94
2003	Achraf Tadili; Canada	1:45.05	Osmar dos Santos; Brazil	1:45.64	Fabiano Peçanha; Brazil	1:46.39
2007	Yeimer López; Cuba	1:44.58 GR PB	Kléberson Davide; Brazil	1:45.47	Fabiano Peçanha; Brazil	1:45.54
2011	Andy González; Cuba	1:45.58 SB	Kléberson Davide; Brazil	1:45.75	Raidel Acea; Cuba	1:46.23
2015	Clayton Murphy; United States	1:47.19	Rafith Rodríguez; Colombia	1:47.23	Ryan Martin; United States	1:47.73
2019	Marco Arop; Canada	1:44.25; GR, PB	Wesley Vázquez; Puerto Rico	1:44.48	Ryan Sánchez; Puerto Rico	1:45.19
2023	José Antonio Maita; Venezuela	1:45.69	Jesús Tonatiú López; Mexico	1:46.04	Navasky Anderson; Jamaica	1:46.40

=== 1,500 metres ===
Games	Gold		Silver		Bronze	
1951	Browning Ross; United States	4:00.4	Guillermo Solá; Chile	4:00.5	John Twomey; United States	4:02.0
1955	Juan Miranda; Argentina	3:53.30A	Wes Santee; United States	3:53.44A	Fred Dwyer; United States	3:56.04A
1959	Dyrol Burleson; United States	3:49.1	Jim Grelle; United States	3:49.9	Ed Moran; United States	3:50.1
1963	Jim Grelle; United States	3:43.62	Jim Beatty; United States	3:43.88	Don Bertoia; Canada	3:55.19
1967	Tom Von Ruden; United States	3:43.41	Sam Bair; United States	3:44.17	Dave Bailey; Canada	3:44.93
1971	Marty Liquori; United States	3:42.10	Bill Smart; Canada	3:43.39	Jim Crawford; United States	3:43.76
1975	Tony Waldrop; United States	3:45.09A	Carlos Martínez; Mexico	3:45.98A	Luis Medina; Cuba	3:49.84A
1979	Don Paige; United States	3:40.4a	Todd Harbour; United States	3:41.5a	Agberto Guimarães; Brazil	3:41.5a
1983	Agberto Guimarães; Brazil	3:42.91	Ross Donoghue; United States	3:43.09	Chuck Aragon; United States	3:44.57
1987	Joaquim Cruz; Brazil	3:47.34	Jim Spivey; United States	3:47.46	Steve Scott; United States	3:47.76
1991	José Valente; Brazil	3:42.90	Bill Burke; United States	3:43.04	Dan Bertoia; Canada	3:43.71
1995	Joaquim Cruz; Brazil	3:40.26	Terrance Herrington; United States	3:40.97	Jason Pyrah; United States	3:42.34
1999	Graham Hood; Canada	3:41.20	Michael Stember; United States	3:41.96	Hudson de Souza; Brazil	3:42.18
2003	Hudson de Souza; Brazil	3:45.72	Michael Stember; United States	3:46.31	Grant Robison; United States	3:46.68
2007	Hudson de Souza; Brazil	3:36.32 GR PB	Juan Barrios; Mexico	3:37.71	Bayron Piedra; Ecuador	3:37.88 NR
2011	Leandro Prates; Brazil	3:53.44	Bayron Piedra; Ecuador	3:53.45	Eduar Villanueva; Venezuela	3:54.06
2015	Andrew Wheating; United States	3:41.41	Nathan Brannen; Canada	3:41.66	Charles Philibert-Thiboutot; Canada	3:41.79
2019	José Carlos Villarreal; Mexico	3:39.93	John Gregorek Jr. United States	3:40.42	William Paulson; Canada	3:41.15
2023	Charles Philibert-Thiboutot; Canada	3:39.74	Robert Heppenstall; Canada	3:39.76	Casey Comber; United States	3:39.90

=== 5,000 metres ===
Games	Gold		Silver		Bronze	
1951	Ricardo Bralo; Argentina	14:57.2	John Twomey; United States	14:57.5	Gustavo Rojas; Chile	15:06.4
1955	Osvaldo Suárez; Argentina	15:30.6A	Horace Ashenfelter; United States	15:31.4A	Jaime Correa; Chile	15:39.2A
1959	Bill Dellinger; United States	14:28.4	Osvaldo Suárez; Argentina	14:28.6	Doug Kyle; Canada	14:33.0
1963	Osvaldo Suárez; Argentina	14:25.81	Charley Clark; United States	14:27.16	Bob Schul; United States	14:29.21
1967	Van Nelson; United States	13:47.4	Lou Scott; United States	13:54.0	Juan Máximo Martínez; Mexico	13:54.0
1971	Steve Prefontaine; United States	13:52.53	Steve Stageberg; United States	14:00.76	Mario Pérez; Mexico	14:03.98
1975	Domingo Tibaduiza; Colombia	14:02.00A	Theodore Castaneda; United States	14:03.20A	Rodolfo Gómez; Mexico	14:05.25A
1979	Matt Centrowitz; United States	14:01.0a	Herb Lindsay; United States	14:04.1a	Rodolfo Gómez; Mexico	14:05.0a
1983	Eduardo Castro; Mexico	13:54.11	Gerardo Alcalá; Mexico	13:54.37	Domingo Tibaduiza; Colombia	13:59.68
1987	Arturo Barrios; Mexico	13:31.40	Adauto Domingues; Brazil	13:46.41	Omar Aguilar; Chile	13:47.86
1991	Arturo Barrios; Mexico	13:34.67	Ignacio Fragoso; Mexico	13:35.83	Antonio Silio; Argentina	13:45.15
1995	Armando Quintanilla; Mexico	13:30.35	Wander Moura; Brazil	13:45.53	Silvio Guerra; Ecuador	13:52.29
1999	David Galván; Mexico	13:42.04	Elenilson da Silva; Brazil	13:43.13	Jeff Schiebler; Canada	13:43.66
2003	Hudson de Souza; Brazil	13:50.71	David Galván; Mexico	13:52.92	Marílson dos Santos; Brazil	13:56.90
2007	Ed Moran; United States	13:25.60 GR PB	Juan Barrios; Mexico	13:29.87	Marílson dos Santos; Brazil	13:30.87
2011	Juan Luis Barrios; Mexico	14:13.77	Bayron Piedra; Ecuador	14:15.74	Joílson da Silva; Brazil	14:16.11
2015	Juan Luis Barrios; Mexico	13:46.47	David Torrence; United States	13:46.60	Víctor Aravena; Chile	13:46.94 PB
2019	Fernando Martínez; Mexico	13:53.87	Altobeli da Silva; Brazil	13:54.42	Carlos Díaz; Chile	13:54.43
2023	Kasey Knevelbaard; United States	14:47.69	Charles Philibert-Thiboutot; Canada	14:48.02	Altobeli da Silva; Brazil	14:48.18

=== 10,000 metres ===
Games	Gold		Silver		Bronze	
1951	Curt Stone; United States	31:08.6	Ricardo Bralo; Argentina	31:09.4	Ezequiel Bustamente; Argentina	32:31.8
1955	Osvaldo Suárez; Argentina	32:42.6A	Vicente Sánchez; Mexico	33:00.4A	Jaime Correa; Chile	33:42.6A
1959	Osvaldo Suárez; Argentina	30:17.2	Doug Kyle; Canada	30:18.0	Bob Soth; United States	30:21.8
1963	Pete McArdle; United States	29:52.22	Osvaldo Suárez; Argentina	30:26.56	Eligio Galicia; Mexico	30:27.90
1967	Van Nelson; United States	29:17.40	Dave Ellis; Canada	29:18.40	Tom Laris; United States	29:21.60
1971	Frank Shorter; United States	28:50.83	Juan Máximo Martínez; Mexico	29:05.07	Álvaro Mejía; Colombia	29:06.97
1975	Luis Hernández; Mexico	29:19.28A	Rodolfo Gómez; Mexico	29:21.22A	Domingo Tibaduiza; Colombia	29:25.45A
1979	Rodolfo Gómez; Mexico	29:02.4a	Enrique Aquino; Mexico	29:03.9a	Frank Shorter; United States	29:06.4a
1983	José Gómez; Mexico	29:14.75	Domingo Tibaduiza; Colombia	29:17.12	Mark Nenow; United States	29:22.46
1987	Bruce Bickford; United States	28:20.37	Rolando Vera; Ecuador	28:22.56	Paul McCloy; Canada	28:38.07
1991	Martín Pitayo; Mexico	29:45.49	Ángel Rodríguez; Cuba	29:54.41	Juan Linares; Cuba	30:09.58
1995	Armando Quintanilla; Mexico	28:57.41	Valdenor dos Santos; Brazil	29:04.79	Ronaldo da Costa; Brazil	29:07.68
1999	Elenilson da Silva; Brazil	28:43.50	David Galván; Mexico	28:44.03	Pete Julian; United States	28:44.55
2003	Teodoro Vega; Mexico	28:49.38	Marílson dos Santos; Brazil	28:49.48	Dan Browne; United States	29:06.23
2007	David Galván; Mexico	28:08.74 GR PB	Marílson dos Santos; Brazil	28:09.30	Alejandro Suárez; Mexico	28:09.95
2011	Marílson dos Santos; Brazil	29:00.64	Juan Carlos Romero; Mexico	29:41.00	Giovani dos Santos; Brazil	29:51.71
2015	Mohammed Ahmed; Canada	28:49.96	Aron Rono; United States	28:50.83	Juan Luis Barrios; Mexico	28:51.57
2019	Ederson Pereira; Brazil	28:27.47; PB	Reid Buchanan; United States	28:28.41	Lawi Lalang; United States	28:31.75
2023	Isai Rodriguez; United States	28:17.84	Samuel Chelanga; United States	29:01.21	Alberto González; Independent Athletes Team	29:12.24

=== Marathon ===
Games	Gold		Silver		Bronze	
1951	Delfo Cabrera; Argentina	2:35:01	Reinaldo Gorno; Argentina	2:45:00	Luis Velásquez; Guatemala	2:46:03
1955	Mateo Flores; Guatemala	2:59:10A	Onésimo Rodríguez; Mexico	3:02:22A	Luis Velásquez; Guatemala	3:05:26A
1959	John J. Kelley; United States	2:27:55	Jim Green; United States	2:32:17	Gordon Dickson; Canada	2:36:19
1963	Fidel Negrete; Mexico	2:27:56	Gordon McKenzie; United States	2:31:18	Pete McArdle; United States	2:34:14
1967	Andy Boychuk; Canada	2:23:03	Agustín Calle; Colombia	2:25:51	Alfredo Peñaloza; Mexico	2:27:49
1971	Frank Shorter; United States	2:22:40	José García; Mexico	2:26:30	Hernán Barreneche; Colombia	2:27:19
1975	Rigoberto Mendoza; Cuba	2:25:03A	Charles "Chuck" Smead; United States	2:25:32A	Tom Howard; Canada	2:25:46A
1979	Radamés González; Cuba	2:24:09	Luis Barbosa; Colombia	2:24:44	Rich Hughson; Canada	2:25:34
1983	Jorge González; Puerto Rico	2:12:43 (NR)	César Mercado; Puerto Rico	2:20:30	Miguel Cruz; Mexico	2:21:12
1987	Ivo Rodrígues; Brazil	2:20:13	Ronald Lanzoni; Costa Rica	2:20:39	Jorge González; Puerto Rico	2:21:14
1991	Alberto Cuba; Cuba	2:19:27	José Santana; Brazil	2:19:29	Radamés González; Cuba	2:23:05
1995	Benjamín Paredes; Mexico	2:14:44	Mark Coogan; United States	2:15:21	Luiz Carlos da Silva; Brazil	2:15:46
1999	Vanderlei de Lima; Brazil	2:17:20	Rubén Maza; Venezuela	2:19:56	Éder Fialho; Brazil	2:20:09
2003	Vanderlei de Lima; Brazil	2:19:08	Bruce Deacon; Canada	2:20:35	Diego Colorado; Colombia	2:21:48
2007	Franck Caldeira; Brazil	2:14:03	José Amado García; Guatemala	2:14:27	Procopio Franco; Mexico	2:15:18
2011	Solonei da Silva; Brazil	2:16:37	Diego Colorado; Colombia	2:17:13 PB	Juan Carlos Cardona; Colombia	2:18:20
2015	Richer Pérez; Cuba	2:17:04 PB	Raúl Pacheco; Peru	2:17:13	Mariano Mastromarino; Argentina	2:17:45
2019	Cristhian Pacheco; Peru	2:09:31; GR	José Luis Santana; Mexico	2:10:54; PB	Juan Joel Pacheco; Mexico	2:12:10
2023	Cristhian Pacheco; Peru	2:11:14	Hugo Catrileo; Chile	2:12:07	Luis Ostos; Peru	2:12:34

=== 110 metres hurdles ===
Games	Gold		Silver		Bronze	
1951	Dick Attlesey; United States	14.0	Estanislao Kocourek; Argentina	14.2	Samuel Anderson; Cuba	14.2
1955	Jack Davis; United States	14.44A	Keith Gardner; Jamaica	14.74A	Evaristo Iglesias; Cuba	14.94A
1959	Hayes Jones; United States	13.6w	Lee Calhoun; United States	13.7w	Elias Gilbert; United States	14.0w
1963	Blaine Lindgren; United States	13.8w	Willie May; United States	14.0w	Lázaro Betancourt; Cuba	14.3w
1967	Earl McCullouch; United States	13.49	Willie Davenport; United States	13.55	Juan Morales; Cuba	14.30
1971	Rod Milburn; United States	13.46w	Arnaldo Bristol; Puerto Rico	13.81w	Juan Morales; Cuba	13.85w
1975	Alejandro Casañas; Cuba	13.44A	Danny Smith; Bahamas	13.72A	Arnaldo Bristol; Puerto Rico	13.74A
1979	Renaldo Nehemiah; United States	13.20	Alejandro Casañas; Cuba	13.46	Charles Foster; United States	13.56
1983	Roger Kingdom; United States	13.44	Alejandro Casañas; Cuba	13.51	Tonie Campbell; United States	13.54
1987	Andrew Parker; Jamaica	13.82w	Modesto Castillo; Dominican Republic	13.96w	Ernesto Torres; Puerto Rico	14.68w
1991	Cletus Clark; United States	13.71	Alexis Sánchez; Cuba	13.76	Elbert Ellis; United States	13.89
1995	Roger Kingdom; United States	13.39	Emilio Valle; Cuba	13.4	Courtney Hawkins; United States	13.54
1999	Anier García; Cuba	13.17 GR	Yoel Hernández; Cuba	13.24	Eugene Swift; United States	13.41
2003	Yuniel Hernández; Cuba	13.35	Larry Wade; United States	13.35	Márcio de Souza; Brazil	13.45
2007	Dayron Robles; Cuba	13.25	David Payne; United States	13.43	Yoel Hernández; Cuba	13.50
2011	Dayron Robles; Cuba	13.10 GR	Paulo Villar; Colombia	13.27 AR	Orlando Ortega; Cuba	13.30
2015	David Oliver; United States	13.07 GR	Mikel Thomas; Trinidad and Tobago	13.17 PB	Shane Brathwaite; Barbados	13.21 PB
2019	Shane Brathwaite; Barbados	13.31	Freddie Crittenden; United States	13.32	Eduardo de Deus; Brazil	13.48
2023	Eduardo de Deus; Brazil	13.67	De'Vion Wilson; United States	13.78	Rafael Pereira; Brazil	14.04

=== 400 metres hurdles ===
Games	Gold		Silver		Bronze	
1951	Jaime Aparicio; Colombia	53.4	Wilson Carneiro; Brazil	53.7	Don Halderman; United States	54.5
1955	Josh Culbreath; United States	51.5A	Jaime Aparicio; Colombia	51.8A	Wilson Carneiro; Brazil	53.0A
1959	Josh Culbreath; United States	51.2	Dick Howard; United States	51.3	Clifton Cushman; United States	53.0
1963	Juan Carlos Dyrzka; Argentina	50.32	Willie Atterberry; United States	50.49	Russ Rogers; United States	51.19
1967	Ron Whitney; United States	50.75	Russ Rogers; United States	51.31	Bob McLaren; Canada	51.44
1971	Ralph Mann; United States	49.11	Jim Seymour; United States	50.36	José Jacinto Hidalgo; Venezuela	51.68
1975	James King; United States	49.60A	Ralph Mann; United States	50.04A	Dámaso Alfonso; Cuba	50.19A
1979	James Walker; United States	49.66	Antônio Dias Ferreira; Brazil	50.85	Frank Montiéh; Cuba	51.30
1983	Frank Montiéh; Cuba	50.02	Antônio Dias Ferreira; Brazil	50.08	James King; United States	50.31
1987	Winthrop Graham; Jamaica	48.49	Kevin Young; United States	48.74	David Patrick; United States	49.47
1991	Eronilde de Araújo; Brazil	49.96	McClinton Neal; United States	50.05	Torrance Zellner; United States	50.21
1995	Eronilde de Araújo; Brazil	49.29	Éverson Teixeira; Brazil	50.24	Llimy Rivas; Colombia	50.37
1999	Eronilde de Araújo; Brazil	48.23 GR	Eric Thomas; United States	48.40	Torrance Zellner; United States	48.45
2003	Félix Sánchez; Dominican Republic	48.19	Eric Thomas; United States	48.74	Dean Griffiths; Jamaica	49.35
2007	Adam Kunkel; Canada	48.24	Bayano Kamani; Panama	48.70	LaRon Bennett; United States	49.07
2011	Omar Cisneros; Cuba	47.99 GR, NR	Isa Phillips; Jamaica	48.82	Félix Sánchez; Dominican Republic	48.85
2015	Jeffery Gibson; Bahamas	48.51 NR	Javier Culson; Puerto Rico	48.67	Roxroy Cato; Jamaica	48.72 SB
2019	Alison dos Santos; Brazil	48.45; PB	Amere Lattin; United States	48.98	Kemar Mowatt; Jamaica	49.09
2023	Jaheel Hyde; Jamaica	49.19	Matheus Lima; Brazil	49.69	Yoao Illas; Cuba	49.74

=== 3000 metre steeplechase ===
Games	Gold		Silver		Bronze	
1951	Curt Stone; United States	9:32.0	Browning Ross; United States	9:32.0	Pedro Caffa; Argentina	9:44.6
1955	Guillermo Solá; Chile	9:46.8A	Santiago Novas; Chile	9:50.4A	Eligio Galicia; Mexico	9:54.2A
1959	Phil Coleman; United States	8:56.4	Deacon Jones; United States	8:56.6	Alfredo Tinoco; Mexico	8:58.0
1963	Jeff Fishback; United States	9:07.9	Sebastião Mendes; Brazil	9:12.8	Albertino Etchechury; Uruguay	9:17.3
1967	Chris McCubbins; United States	8:38.2	Conrad Nightingale; United States	8:51.2	Domingo Amaizón; Argentina	8:55.0
1971	Mike Manley; United States	8:42.27	Sidney Sink; United States	8:42.90	Héctor Villanueva; Mexico	8:46.09
1975	Mike Manley; United States	9:04.29A	José Andrade Silva; Brazil	9:05.31A	Octavio Guadarrama; Mexico	9:15.00A
1979	Henry Marsh; United States	8:43.6a	William McCullough; United States	8:44.7a	Demetrio Cabanillos; Mexico	8:52.4a
1983	Emilio Ulloa; Chile	8:57.62	Carmelo Ríos; Puerto Rico	9:01.47	Greg Duhaime; Canada	9:06.03
1987	Adauto Domingues; Brazil	8:23.26	Henry Marsh; United States	8:23.77	Brian Abshire; United States	8:27.30
1991	Adauto Domingues; Brazil	8:36.01	Ricardo Vera; Uruguay	8:36.83	Juan Ramón Conde; Cuba	8:37.53
1995	Wander Moura; Brazil	8:14.41	Brian Diemer; United States	8:30.58	Dan Reese; United States	8:31.58
1999	Joël Bourgeois; Canada	8:35.03	Francis O'Neill; United States	8:35.73	Jean-Nicolas Duval; Canada	8:39.52
2003	Néstor Nieves; Venezuela	8:34.26	Joël Bourgeois; Canada	8:36.78	Anthony Famiglietti; United States	8:40.22
2007	Joshua McAdams; United States	8:30.49	Michael Spence; United States	8:32.11	José Alberto Sánchez; Cuba	8:36.07
2011	José Peña; Venezuela	8:48.19	Hudson de Souza; Brazil	8:48.75	José Alberto Sánchez; Cuba	8:49.75
2015	Matthew Hughes; Canada	8:32.18	Alex Genest; Canada	8:33.83	Cory Leslie; United States	8:36.83
2019	Altobeli da Silva; Brazil	8:30.73	Carlos San Martín; Colombia	8:32.24	Mario Bazán; Peru	8:32.34
2023	Jean-Simon Desgagnés; Canada	8:30.14	Daniel Michalski; United States	8:36.47	Carlos San Martín; Colombia	8:41.59

=== 10,000 metres track walk ===
Games	Gold		Silver		Bronze	
1951	Henry Laskau; United States	50:26.8	Luis Turza; Argentina	52:27.5	Martín Casas; Argentina	52:59.6

=== 20km road walk ===
Games	Gold		Silver		Bronze	
1963	Alex Oakley; Canada	1:42:44	Nicole Marrone; Canada	1:46:35	Ronald Zinn; United States	1:49:45
1967	Ron Laird; United States	1:33:06	José Pedraza; Mexico	1:34:51	Felix Cappella; Canada	1:35:45
1971	Goetz Klopfer; United States	1:37:30	Tom Dooley; United States	1:38:16	José Oliveros; Mexico	1:40:26
1975	Daniel Bautista; Mexico	1:33:06A	Domingo Colín; Mexico	1:33:59A	Larry Young; United States	1:37:54A
1979	Daniel Bautista; Mexico	1:28:15	Neal Pyke; United States	1:30:17	Todd Scully; United States	1:32:30
1983	Ernesto Canto; Mexico	1:28:12	Raúl González; Mexico	1:29:21	Héctor Moreno; Colombia	1:30:05
1987	Carlos Mercenario; Mexico	1:24:50	Tim Lewis; United States	1:25:50	Querubín Moreno; Colombia	1:27:08
1991	Héctor Moreno; Colombia	1:24:56	Joel Sánchez Guerrero; Mexico	1:25:45	Marcelo Palma; Brazil	1:26:42
1995	Jefferson Pérez; Ecuador	1:22:53	Daniel García; Mexico	1:22:57	Julio René Martínez; Guatemala	1:23:50
1999	Bernardo Segura; Mexico	1:20:17	Daniel García; Mexico	1:20:28	Jefferson Pérez; Ecuador	1:20:46
2003	Jefferson Pérez; Ecuador	1:23:06	Bernardo Segura; Mexico	1:23:31	Alejandro López; Mexico	1:24:33
2007	Jefferson Pérez; Ecuador	1:22:08	Rolando Saquipay; Ecuador	1:23:28	Gustavo Restrepo; Colombia	1:24:51
2011	Érick Barrondo; Guatemala	1:21:51	James Rendón; Colombia	1:22:46	Luis Fernando López; Colombia	1:22:51
2015	Evan Dunfee; Canada	1:23:06	Iñaki Gómez; Canada	1:24:25	Caio Bonfim; Brazil	1:24:43
2019	Brian Pintado; Ecuador	1:21:51	Caio Bonfim; Brazil	1:21:57	José Alejandro Barrondo; Guatemala	1:21:57
2023	David Hurtado; Ecuador	1:19.20	Caio Bonfim; Brazil	1:19.24	Andrés Olivas; Mexico	1:19.56

=== 50km road walk ===
Games	Gold		Silver		Bronze	
1951	Sixto Ibáñez; Argentina	5:06:07	James Jackson; United States	5:21:13	Amando González; Argentina	5:27:01
1967	Larry Young; United States	4:26:21	Felix Cappella; Canada	4:36:00	Goetz Klopfer; United States	4:38:00
1971	Larry Young; United States	4:38:31	Gabriel Hernández; Mexico	4:38:46	John Knifton; United States	4:42:15
1979	Raúl González; Mexico	4:05:17	Martín Bermúdez; Mexico	4:11:13	Marco Evoniuk; United States	4:24:20
1983	Raúl González; Mexico	4:00:45	Martín Bermúdez; Mexico	4:04:20	Querubín Moreno; Colombia	4:23:20
1987	Martín Bermúdez; Mexico	3:58:54	Raúl González; Mexico	4:07:27	Héctor Moreno; Colombia	4:18:48
1991	Carlos Mercenario; Mexico	4:03:09	Miguel Rodríguez; Mexico	4:04:06	Edel Oliva; Cuba	4:16:27
1995	Carlos Mercenario; Mexico	3:47:55	Miguel Rodríguez; Mexico	3:48:22	Julio César Urías; Guatemala	3:49:37 NR
1999	Joel Sánchez; Mexico	4:06:31	Carlos Mercenario; Mexico	4:09:48	Philip Dunn; United States	4:13:45
2003	Germán Sánchez; Mexico	4:05:01	Mário dos Santos; Brazil	4:07:36	Luis Fernando García; Guatemala	4:12:14
2007	Xavier Moreno; Ecuador	3:52:07	Horacio Nava; Mexico	3:52:35	Omar Zepeda; Mexico	3:56:04
2011	Horacio Nava; Mexico	3:48.58	José Leyver Ojeda; Mexico	3:49.16 PB	Jaime Quiyuch; Guatemala	3:50.33 PB
2015	Andrés Chocho; Ecuador	3:50:13 SB	Érick Barrondo; Guatemala	3:55:57	Horacio Nava; Mexico	3:57:28
2019	Claudio Villanueva; Ecuador	3:50:01 PB	Horacio Nava; Mexico	3:51:45 SB	Diego Pinzón; Colombia	3:53:49 PB

=== 4 × 100 metres relay ===
Games	Gold		Silver		Bronze	
1951	United States; Donald Campbell; Art Bragg; Dick Attlesey; John Voight	41.0	Cuba; Raúl Mazorra; Angel García; Jesús Farrés; Rafael Fortún	41.2	Argentina; Gerardo Bönnhoff; Adelio Márquez; Fernando Lapuente; Mariano Acosta	41.8
1955	United States; Rod Richard; Willie Williams; Charles Thomas; John Bennett	40.96A	Venezuela; Clive Bonas; Guillermo Gutiérrez; Apolinar Solórzano; Juan Leiva	41.36A	Mexico; Sergio Higuera; Javier Souza; René Ahumada; Alberto Goya	41.94A
1959	United States; Hayes Jones; Robert Poynter; William Woodhouse; Ray Norton	40.4	Venezuela; Emilio Romero; Lloyd Murad; Clive Bonas; Rafael Romero	41.1	British West Indies; Clifton Bertrand; Mike Agostini; Wilton Jackson; Dennis Johnson	41.6
1963	United States; Earl Young; Ollan Cassell; Brooks Johnson; Ira Murchison	40.40	Venezuela; José Thomas; Horacio Esteves; Arquímedes Herrera; Rafael Romero	40.71	Trinidad and Tobago; Clifton Bertrand; Anthony Jones; Irving Joseph; Cipriani Phillip	40.87
1967	United States; Jerry Bright; Ron Copeland; Willie Turner; Earl McCullouch	39.05	Cuba; Félix Eugellés; Hermes Ramírez; Pablo Montes; Juan Morales	39.26	Colombia; Carlos Álvarez; Pedro Grajales; Hernando Arrechea; Jaime Uribe	39.92
1971	Jamaica; Alfred Daley; Don Quarrie; Carl Lawson; Lennox Miller	39.28	Cuba; Pablo Montes; Hermes Ramírez; Juan Morales; Barbaro Bandomo	39.84	United States; Rod Milburn; Willie Deckard; Marshall Dill; Ron Draper	39.84
1975	United States; Bill Collins; Clancy Edwards; Larry Brown; Donald Merrick	38.31A	Cuba; Pablo Montes; José Triana; Alejandro Casañas; Hermes Ramírez	38.46A	Canada; Hugh Fraser; Marvin Nash; Robert Martin; Albin Dukowski	38.86A
1979	United States; Harvey Glance; Mike Roberson; Cliff Wiley; Steve Riddick	38.85	Cuba; Alejandro Casañas; Juan Saborit; Silvio Leonard; Osvaldo Lara	39.14	Brazil; Milton de Castro; Rui da Silva; Nelson dos Santos; Altevir de Araújo	39.44
1983	United States; Sam Graddy; Bernie Jackson; Ken Robinson; Elliott Quow	38.49	Cuba; Osvaldo Lara; Leandro Peñalver; Silvio Leonard; José Isalgue	38.55	Brazil; Gérson de Souza; João Batista da Silva; Nelson dos Santos; Robson Caetano	39.08
1987	United States; Carl Lewis; Lee Vernon McNeill; Lee McRae; Harvey Glance	38.41	Cuba; Andrés Simón; Leandro Peñalver; Sergio Querol; Ricardo Chacón	38.86	Jamaica; Ray Stewart; Andrew Smith; Clive Wright; John Mair	38.86
1991	Cuba; Leandro Peñalver; Félix Stevens; Jorge Aguilera; Joel Lamela	39.08	Canada; Donovan Bailey; Mike Dwyer; Peter Ogilvie; Everton Anderson	39.95	Virgin Islands; Keith Smith; Kevin Robinson; Neville Hodge; Derry Pemberton	41.02
1995	Cuba; Joel Isasi; Jorge Aguilera; Joel Lamela; Iván García	38.67	United States; Robert Reading; Wendell Gaskin; Ron Clark; Dino Napier	39.12	Mexico; Jaime Barragán; Carlos Villaseñor; Salvador Miranda; Alejandro Cárdenas	39.77
1999	Brazil; Raphael de Oliveira; Claudinei Quirino; Édson Luciano; André Domingos	38.18 GR	Canada; Donovan Bailey; Glenroy Gilbert; Bradley McCuaig; Trevino Betty	38.49	Jamaica; Garth Robinson; Patrick Jarrett; Christopher Williams; Dwight Thomas	38.82
2003	Brazil; Vicente Lenílson; Édson Luciano; André Domingos; Claudinei Quirino	38.44	Trinidad and Tobago; Niconnor Alexander; Marc Burns; Ato Boldon; Darrel Brown	38.53	Cuba; José Ángel César; José Carlos Peña; Luis Alexander Reyes; Juan Pita	39.09
2007	Brazil; Vicente Lenílson; Rafael Ribeiro; Basílio de Moraes; Sandro Viana	38.81	Canada; Richard Adu-Bobie; Anson Henry; Jared Connaughton; Bryan Barnett	38.87	United States; J-Mee Samuels; Monzavous Edwards; Rubin Williams; Darvis Patton	38.88
2011	Brazil; Ailson Feitosa; Sandro Viana; Nilson André; Bruno de Barros	38.18 GR	Saint Kitts and Nevis; Jason Rogers; Antoine Adams; Delwayne Delaney; Brijesh Lawrence	38.81	United States; Calesio Newman; Jeremy Dodson; Rubin Williams; Monzavous Edwards	39.17
2015	United States; BeeJay Lee; Wallace Spearmon; Kendal Williams; Remontay McClain; Sean McLean	38.27	Brazil; Gustavo dos Santos; Vitor Hugo dos Santos; Bruno de Barros; Aldemir da Silva Júnior	38.68	Trinidad and Tobago; Rondel Sorrillo; Keston Bledman; Emmanuel Callender; Dan-Neil Telesford; Mikel Thomas	38.69
2019	Brazil; Rodrigo do Nascimento; Jorge Vides; Derick Silva; Paulo André de Oliveira	38.27	Trinidad and Tobago; Jerod Elcock; Keston Bledman; Akanni Hislop; Kyle Greaux	38.46 SB	United States; Jarret Eaton; Cravon Gillespie; Bryce Robinson; Mike Rodgers	38.79
2023	Brazil; Rodrigo do Nascimento; Felipe Bardi; Erik Cardoso; Renan Gallina	38.68	Cuba; Reynaldo Espinosa; Edel Amores; Yaniel Carrero; Shainer Rengifo	39.26	Argentina; Tomás Mondino; Bautista Diamante; Juan Ignacio Ciampitti; Franco Florio	39.48; SB

=== 4 × 400 metres relay ===
Games	Gold		Silver		Bronze	
1951	United States; Bill Brown; Mal Whitfield; John Voight; Hugo Maiocco	3:09.9	Chile; Jaime Hitelman; Reinaldo Martín Muller; Gustavo Ehlers; Jörn Gevert	3:17.7	Argentina; Guido Veronese; Máximo Guerra; Julio Ferreyra; Eduardo Balducci	3:18.4
1955	United States; Jesse Mashburn; Lonnie Spurrier; Jim Lea; Lou Jones	3:07.43A	Jamaica; Allan Moore; Richard Estick; Keith Gardner; Mel Spence	3:12.63A	Venezuela; Juan Leiva; Guillermo Gutiérrez; Evaristo Edie; Apolinar Solórzano	3:15.93A
1959	British West Indies; Mal Spence; Mel Spence; Basil Ince; George Kerr	3:05.3	United States; Eddie Southern; Josh Culbreath; Jack Yerman; Dave Mills	3:05.8	Puerto Rico; Frank Rivera; Iván Rodríguez; Ramón Vega; Jossué Cains	3:12.4
1963	United States; Ollan Cassell; James Johnson; Richard Edmunds; Earl Young	3:09.62	Venezuela; Hortensio Fucil; Arístides Pineda; Víctor Maldonado; Leslie Mentor	3:12.20	Jamaica; Anthony Carr; Rupert Hoilette; Malcolm Spence; Mel Spence	3:12.61
1967	United States; Vince Matthews; Emmett Taylor; Elbert Stinson; Lee Evans	3:02.03	Canada; Bill Crothers; Brian MacLaren; Ross MacKenzie; Bob McLaren	3:04.83	Jamaica; Clifton Forbes; Michael Fray; Alex McDonald; Neville Myton	3:05.99
1971	United States; John Smith; Dale Alexander; Fred Newhouse; Tommy Turner	3:00.63	Jamaica; Leighton Priestley; Alfred Daley; Trevor Campbell; Garth Case	3:03.98	Trinidad and Tobago; Kent Bernard; Trevor James; Ben Cayenne; Edwin Roberts	3:04.58
1975	United States; Herman Frazier; Robert Taylor; Maurice Peoples; Ronnie Ray	3:00.76A	Cuba; Eddy Gutiérrez; Alberto Juantorena; Carlos Álvarez; Dámaso Alfonso	3:02.82A	Canada; Randy Jackson; Brian Saunders; Glenn Bogue; Don Domansky	3:03.92A
1979	United States; Tony Darden; Maurice Peoples; Herman Frazier; James Walker	3:03.8a	Jamaica; Colin Bradford; Floyd Brown; Ian Stapleton; Bert Cameron	3:04.7a	Cuba; Alberto Juantorena; Pedro Tanis; Carlos Álvarez; Frank Montiéh	3:06.3a
1983	United States; Alonzo Babers; Mike Bradley; James Rolle; Eddie Carey	3:00.47	Brazil; Evaldo da Silva; José Luíz Barbosa; Agberto Guimarães; Gérson de Souza	3:02.79	Cuba; Lázaro Martínez; Agustín Pavó; Carlos Reyté; Héctor Herrera	3:03.15
1987	United States; Raymond Pierre; Kevin Robinzine; Roddie Haley; Mark Rowe	2:59.54	Cuba; Agustín Pavó; Lazaro Martínez; Roberto Hernández; Leandro Peñalver	2:59.72	Jamaica; Winthrop Graham; Mark Senior; Berris Long; Devon Morris	3:03.57
1991	Cuba; Héctor Herrera; Agustín Pavó; Jorge Valentín; Lázaro Martínez	3:01.93	United States; Gabriel Luke; Jeff Reynolds; Quincy Watts; Clarence Daniel	3:02.02	Jamaica; Patrick O'Connor; Howard Burnett; Michael Anderson; Seymour Fagan	3:02.12
1995	Cuba; Jorge Crusellas; Norberto Téllez; Omar Mena; Iván García	3:01.53	Jamaica; Orville Taylor; Dennis Blake; Roxbert Martin; Michael McDonald	3:02.11	Trinidad and Tobago; Robert Guy; Neil de Silva; Hayden Stephen; Ian Morris	3:02.24
1999	Jamaica; Michael McDonald; Greg Haughton; Danny McFarlane; Davian Clarke; Paston Coke*	2:57.97 GR	Brazil; Eronilde de Araújo; Claudinei Quirino; Anderson Jorge dos Santos; Sanderlei Parrela; Cleverson da Silva*	2:58.56	United States; Danny McCray; Deon Minor; Torrance Zellner; Alvin Harrison	3:00.94
2003	Jamaica; Michael Campbell; Sanjay Ayre; Lansford Spence; Davian Clarke	3:01.81	United States; Mitchell Potter; Ja'Warren Hooker; Adam Steele; James Davis	3:01.87	Dominican Republic; Arismendy Peguero; Carlos Santa; Julio Vidal; Félix Sánchez	3:02.02 (NR)
2007	Bahamas; Andrae Williams; Avard Moncur; Michael Mathieu; Chris Brown	3:01.94	United States; Greg Nixon; Jamaal Torrance; LaRon Bennett; David Neville	3:02.44	Dominican Republic; Carlos Santa; Arismendy Peguero; Yoel Tapia; Félix Sánchez	3:02.48
2011	Cuba; Noel Ruíz; Raidel Acea; Omar Cisneros; William Collazo	2:59.43 SB	Dominican Republic; Arismendy Peguero; Luguelín Santos; Yoel Tapia; Gustavo Cuesta	3:00.44 NR	Venezuela; Arturo Ramírez; Alberto Aguilar; José Acevedo; Omar Longart	3:00.82 NR
2015	Trinidad and Tobago; Renny Quow; Jarrin Solomon; Emanuel Mayers; Machel Cedenio; Jehue Gordon	2:59.60 SB	Cuba; William Collazo; Adrián Chacón; Osmaidel Pellicier; Yoandys Lescay	2:59.84 SB	United States; Kyle Clemons; James Harris; Marcus Chambers; Kerron Clement; Jeshua Anderson	3:00.21
2019	Colombia; Jhon Perlaza; Diego Palomeque; Jhon Solís; Anthony Zambrano	3:01.41	United States; Mar'Yea Harris; Michael Cherry; Justin Robinson; Wilbert London	3:01.72	Trinidad and Tobago; Dwight St. Hillaire; Jereem Richards; Deon Lendore; Machel Cedenio	3:02.25
2023	Brazil; Lucas Carvalho; Matheus Lima; Douglas Hernandes; Lucas Conceição	3:03.92	Mexico; Guillermo Campos; Luis Avilés; Edgar Ramírez; Valente Mendoza	3:04.22	Dominican Republic; Ezequiel Suárez; Robert King; Ferdy Agramonte; Yeral Nuñez	3:05.98

=== High jump ===
Games	Gold		Silver		Bronze	
1951	Virgil Severns; United States	1.95	Cal Clark; United States	1.90	Adilton de Almeida; Brazil	1.90
1955	Ernie Shelton; United States	2.01A	Herman Wyatt; United States	2.01A	José da Conceição; Brazil	1.91A
1959	Charles Dumas; United States	2.10	Bob Gardner; United States	2.03	Ernle Haisley; British West Indies	2.00
1963	Gene Johnson; United States	2.11	Teodoro Palacios; Guatemala	2.04	Anton Norris; Barbados	2.04
1967	Ed Caruthers; United States	2.19	Otis Burrell; United States	2.16	Roberto Abugattás; Peru	2.05
1971	Pat Matzdorf; United States	2.10	Wilf Wedmann; Canada	2.10	Luis Arbulú; Peru	2.05
1975	Tom Woods; United States	2.25A	John Beers; Canada	2.17A	Rick Cuttell; Canada	2.17A
1979	Franklin Jacobs; United States	2.26	Benn Fields; United States	2.19	Milton Ottey; Canada	2.19
1983	Francisco Centelles; Cuba	2.29	Leo Williams; United States	2.27	Jorge Alfaro; Cuba	2.25
1987	Javier Sotomayor; Cuba	2.32	Troy Kemp; Bahamas	2.28	Jerome Carter; United States	2.28
1991	Javier Sotomayor; Cuba	2.35	Troy Kemp; Bahamas	2.32	Hollis Conway; United States	2.32
1995	Javier Sotomayor; Cuba	2.40	Steve Smith; United States	2.29	Gilmar Mayo; Colombia	2.26
1999	Kwaku Boateng; Canada; Mark Boswell; Canada	2.25	-	-	Charles Clinger; United States	2.25
2003	Germaine Mason; Jamaica	2.34	Jamie Nieto; United States	2.28	Terrance Woods; United States	2.22
2007	Víctor Moya; Cuba	2.32	Donald Thomas; Bahamas	2.30	James Grayman; Antigua and Barbuda	2.24
2011	Donald Thomas; Bahamas	2.32	Diego Ferrín; Ecuador	2.30 NR	Víctor Moya; Cuba	2.26
2015	Derek Drouin; Canada	2.37 SB	Michael Mason; Canada	2.31	Donald Thomas; Bahamas	2.28
2019	Luis Zayas; Cuba	2.30 PB	Michael Mason; Canada	2.28	Roberto Vílches; Mexico	2.26
2023	Luis Zayas; Cuba	2.27	Luis Joel Castro; Puerto Rico	2.24	Donald Thomas; Bahamas	2.24

=== Pole vault ===
Games	Gold		Silver		Bronze	
1951	Bob Richards; United States	4.50	Jaime Piqueras; Peru	3.90	Sinibaldo Gerbasi; Brazil	3.90
1955	Bob Richards; United States	4.50A	Bobby Smith; United States	4.30A	Don Laz; United States	4.30A
1959	Don Bragg; United States	4.62	Jim Graham; United States	4.32	Rolando Cruz; Puerto Rico	4.32
1963	Dave Tork; United States	4.90	Henry Wadsworth; United States	4.75	Rubén Cruz; Puerto Rico	4.30
1967	Bob Seagren; United States	4.90	Bob Raftis; Canada	4.75	Bob Yard; Canada	4.45
1971	Jan Johnson; United States	5.33	David Roberts; United States	5.20	Bruce Simpson; Canada	4.90
1975	Earl Bell; United States	5.40A	Bruce Simpson; Canada	5.20A	Roberto Moré; Cuba	5.20A
1979	Bruce Simpson; Canada	5.15	Greg Woepse; United States	5.05	Brian Morrissette; Virgin Islands	4.85
1983	Mike Tully; United States	5.45	Jeff Buckingham; United States	5.25	Tom Hintnaus; Brazil	5.20
1987	Mike Tully; United States	5.71	Rubén Camino; Cuba	5.50	Scott Davis; United States	5.30
1991	Pat Manson; United States	5.50	Doug Wood; Canada	5.35	Ángel Luis García; Cuba	5.20
1995	Pat Manson; United States	5.75	Bill Deering; United States	5.60	Alberto Manzano; Cuba	5.40
1999	Pat Manson; United States	5.60	Scott Hennig; United States	5.55	Jason Pearce; Canada	5.30
2003	Toby Stevenson; United States	5.45	Russ Buller; United States	5.40	Dominic Johnson; Saint Lucia	5.40
2007	Fábio Gomes; Brazil	5.40	Giovanni Lanaro; Mexico	5.30	Germán Chiaraviglio; Argentina	5.20
2011	Lázaro Borges; Cuba	5.80 GR	Jeremy Scott; United States	5.60	Giovanni Lanaro; Mexico	5.50
2015	Shawnacy Barber; Canada	5.80 GR=	Germán Chiaraviglio; Argentina	5.75 NR	Mark Hollis; United States; Jacob Blankenship; United States	5.40
2019	Chris Nilsen; United States	5.76	Augusto Dutra; Brazil	5.71	Clayton Fritsch; United States	5.61
2023	Matt Ludwig; United States	5.55	Germán Chiaraviglio; Argentina	5.50	Jorge Luna; Mexico	5.40

=== Long jump ===
Games	Gold		Silver		Bronze	
1951	Gay Bryan; United States	7.14	Albino Geist; Argentina	7.09	Jim Holland; United States	6.95
1955	Rosslyn Range; United States	8.03A	John Bennett; United States	8.01A	Ary de Sá; Brazil	7.84A
1959	Bo Roberson; United States	7.97	Greg Bell; United States	7.60	Lester Bird; British West Indies	7.46
1963	Ralph Boston; United States	8.11	Darrell Horn; United States	8.02	Juan Muñoz; Venezuela	7.46
1967	Ralph Boston; United States	8.29	Bob Beamon; United States	8.07	Wellesley Clayton; Jamaica	7.76
1971	Arnie Robinson; United States	8.02	Bouncy Moore; United States	7.98	Mike Mason; Canada	7.65
1975	João de Oliveira; Brazil	8.19A	Arnie Robinson; United States	7.94A	Al Lanier; United States	7.91A
1979	João de Oliveira; Brazil	8.18	David Giralt; Cuba	8.15	Carl Lewis; United States	8.13
1983	Jaime Jefferson; Cuba	8.03A	Vesco Bradley; United States	7.99	Juan Felipe Ortiz; Cuba	7.91
1987	Carl Lewis; United States	8.75	Larry Myricks; United States	8.58w	Jaime Jefferson; Cuba	8.51
1991	Jaime Jefferson; Cuba	8.26	Llewellyn Starks; United States	8.01	Iván Pedroso; Cuba	7.96
1995	Iván Pedroso; Cuba	8.50	Jaime Jefferson; Cuba	8.23	Elmer Williams; Puerto Rico	8.00w
1999	Iván Pedroso; Cuba	8.52	Kareem Streete-Thompson; Cayman Islands	8.12	Luis Felipe Méliz; Cuba	8.06
2003	Iván Pedroso; Cuba	8.23	Luis Felipe Méliz; Cuba	8.20	Víctor Castillo; Venezuela	7.98
2007	Irving Saladino; Panama	8.28	Wilfredo Martínez; Cuba	7.92	Bashir Ramzy; United States	7.90
2011	Daniel Pineda; Chile	7.97	David Registe; Dominica	7.89	Jeremy Hicks; United States	7.83
2015	Jeffery Henderson; United States	8.54	Marquise Goodwin; United States	8.27	Emiliano Lasa; Uruguay	8.17
2019	Juan Miguel Echevarría; Cuba	8.27	Tajay Gayle; Jamaica	8.17	Emiliano Lasa; Uruguay	7.87
2023	Arnovis Dalmero; Colombia	8.08	Alejandro Parada; Cuba	8.01	Maikel Vidal; Cuba	8.01

=== Triple jump ===
Games	Gold		Silver		Bronze	
1951	Adhemar da Silva; Brazil	15.19	Hélio Coutinho; Brazil	15.17	Bruno Witthaus; Argentina	14.34
1955	Adhemar da Silva; Brazil	16.56A	Asnoldo Devonish; Venezuela	16.13A	Víctor Hernández; Cuba	15.60A
1959	Adhemar da Silva; Brazil	15.90	Herman Stokes; United States	15.39	Bill Sharpe; United States	15.25
1963	Bill Sharpe; United States	15.15	Ramón López; Cuba	15.08	Mário Gomes; Brazil	14.97
1967	Charles Craig; United States	16.54	Nelson Prudêncio; Brazil	16.45	José Hernández; Cuba	15.95
1971	Pedro Pérez; Cuba	17.40 WR	Nelson Prudêncio; Brazil	16.82	John Craft; United States	16.32
1975	João de Oliveira; Brazil	17.89A	Tommy Haynes; United States	17.20A	Milan Tiff; United States	16.98A
1979	João de Oliveira; Brazil	17.27	Willie Banks; United States	16.88	James Butts; United States	16.69
1983	Jorge Reyna; Cuba	17.05	Lázaro Betancourt; Cuba	16.75	José Salazar; Venezuela	16.26
1987	Mike Conley; United States	17.31w	Willie Banks; United States	16.87w	Frank Rutherford; Bahamas	16.68w
1991	Yoelbi Quesada; Cuba	17.06	Anísio Silva; Brazil	16.72	Wendell Lawrence; Bahamas	16.69
1995	Yoelbi Quesada; Cuba	17.67	Jérôme Romain; Dominica	17.24	Yoel García; Cuba	17.21w
1999	Yoelbi Quesada; Cuba	17.19	LaMark Carter; United States	17.09	Michael Calvo; Cuba	17.03
2003	Yoandri Betanzos; Cuba	17.26	Jadel Gregório; Brazil	17.03	Yoelbi Quesada; Cuba	16.78
2007	Jadel Gregório; Brazil	17.27	Osniel Tosca; Cuba	16.92	Yoandri Betanzos; Cuba	16.90
2011	Alexis Copello; Cuba	17.21	Yoandri Betanzos; Cuba	16.54	Jefferson Sabino; Brazil	16.51
2015	Pedro Pichardo; Cuba	17.54	Leevan Sands; Bahamas	16.99 SB	Ernesto Revé; Cuba	16.94
2019	Omar Craddock; United States	17.42	Jordan Díaz; Cuba	17.38	Andy Díaz; Cuba	16.83
2023	Lázaro Martínez; Cuba	17.19	Almir dos Santos; Brazil	16.92	Cristian Nápoles; Cuba	16.66

=== Shot put ===
Games	Gold		Silver		Bronze	
1951	Jim Fuchs; United States	17.25	Juan Kahnert; Argentina	14.27	Nadim Marreis; Brazil	14.07
1955	Parry O'Brien; United States	17.59A	Fortune Gordien; United States	15.98A	Marty Engel; United States	14.62A
1959	Parry O'Brien; United States	19.04	Dallas Long; United States	18.51	Dave Davis; United States	17.01
1963	Dave Davis; United States	18.52	Billy Joe; United States	17.77	Cosme Di Cursi; Argentina	16.26
1967	Randy Matson; United States	19.83	Neal Steinhauer; United States	19.45	Dave Steen; Canada	18.51
1971	Al Feuerbach; United States	19.76	Karl Salb; United States	19.10	Mike Mercer; Canada	18.01
1975	Bruce Pirnie; Canada	19.28A	Bishop Dolegiewicz; Canada	19.18A	Terry Albritton; United States	19.18A
1979	Dave Laut; United States	20.22	Bishop Dolegiewicz; Canada	19.67	Bruno Pauletto; Canada	19.61
1983	Luis Delís; Cuba	18.24	Gert Weil; Chile	17.30	Hubert Maingot; Trinidad and Tobago	16.48
1987	Gert Weil; Chile	20.21	Gregg Tafralis; United States	20.17	Paul Ruiz; Cuba	18.86
1991	Gert Weil; Chile	19.47	Paul Ruiz; Cuba	19.30	C. J. Hunter; United States	19.08
1995	C. J. Hunter; United States	20.52	Jorge Montenegro; Cuba	18.94	Gert Weil; Chile	18.71
1999	Brad Mears; United States	19.93	Jamie Beyer; United States	18.95	Bradley Snyder; Canada	18.74
2003	Reese Hoffa; United States	20.95	Marco Antonio Verni; Chile	20.14	Bradley Snyder; Canada	20.10
2007	Dylan Armstrong; Canada	20.10	Dorian Scott; Jamaica	20.06	Carlos Véliz; Cuba	19.75
2011	Dylan Armstrong; Canada	21.30 GR	Carlos Véliz; Cuba	20.76	Germán Lauro; Argentina	20.41 SB
2015	O'Dayne Richards; Jamaica	21.69 GR, NR	Tim Nedow; Canada	20.53	Germán Lauro; Argentina	20.24
2019	Darlan Romani; Brazil	22.07 GR	Jordan Geist; United States	20.67	Uziel Muñoz; Mexico	20.56
2023	Darlan Romani; Brazil	21.36	Uziel Muñoz; Mexico	21.15	Jordan Geist; United States	20.53

=== Discus throw ===
Games	Gold		Silver		Bronze	
1951	Jim Fuchs; United States	48.91	Dick Doyle; United States	47.28	Elvio Porta; Argentina	44.93
1955	Fortune Gordien; United States	53.10A	Parry O'Brien; United States	51.07A	Hernán Haddad; Chile	47.14A
1959	Al Oerter; United States	58.12	Dick Cochran; United States	54.44	Parry O'Brien; United States	51.84
1963	Bob Humphreys; United States	57.82	Dave Davis; United States	51.05	Ben Rebel Bout; Netherlands Antilles	49.78
1967	Gary Carlsen; United States	57.50	Rink Babka; United States	56.88	George Puce; Canada	56.20
1971	Dick Drescher; United States	62.26	Tim Vollmer; United States	61.06	Ain Roost; Canada	58.06
1975	John Powell; United States	62.36A	Julián Morrinson; Cuba	59.88A	Jay Silvester; United States	59.82A
1979	Mac Wilkins; United States	63.30	Bradley Cooper; Bahamas	62.16	Luis Delís; Cuba	61.70
1983	Luis Delís; Cuba	67.32	Bradley Cooper; Bahamas	62.38	Juan Martínez Brito; Cuba	62.04
1987	Luis Delís; Cuba	67.14	Bradley Cooper; Bahamas	64.56	Randy Heisler; United States	62.76
1991	Anthony Washington; United States	65.04	Roberto Moya; Cuba	63.92	Juan Martínez Brito; Cuba	63.52
1995	Roberto Moya; Cuba	63.58	Alexis Elizalde; Cuba	62.00	Randy Heisler; United States	60.12
1999	Anthony Washington; United States	64.25	Alexis Elizalde; Cuba	61.99	Jason Tunks; Canada	61.75
2003	Jason Tunks; Canada	63.70	Frank Casañas; Cuba	62.61	Lois Maikel Martínez; Cuba	61.36
2007	Michael Robertson; United States	59.24	Adam Kuehl; United States	57.50	Dariusz Slowik; Canada	57.37
2011	Jorge Fernández; Cuba	65.58	Jarred Rome; United States	61.71	Ronald Julião; Brazil	61.70
2015	Fedrick Dacres; Jamaica	64.80	Ronald Julião; Brazil	64.65 SB	Russell Winger; United States	62.64
2019	Fedrick Dacres; Jamaica	67.68 GR	Traves Smikle; Jamaica	65.02	Reggie Jagers; United States	64.48
2023	Lucas Nervi; Chile	63.39; SB	Mauricio Ortega; Colombia	61.86	Fedrick Dacres; Jamaica	61.25

=== Hammer throw ===
Games	Gold		Silver		Bronze	
1951	Emilio Ortíz; Argentina	48.04	Manuel Etchepare; Argentina	46.12	Arturo Melcher; Chile	45.70
1955	Bob Backus; United States	54.91A	Marty Engel; United States	53.36A	Elvio Porta; Argentina	51.45A
1959	Al Hall; United States	59.71	Hal Connolly; United States	59.67	Bob Backus; United States	59.55
1963	Al Hall; United States	62.74	Jim Pryde; United States	58.56	Roberto Chapchap; Brazil	57.92
1967	Tom Gage; United States	65.32	Enrique Samuells; Cuba	64.66	George Frenn; United States	64.08
1971	Al Hall; United States	65.84	George Frenn; United States	65.68	Darwin Piñeyrúa; Uruguay	61.54
1975	Larry Hart; United States	66.56A	Ángel Cabrera; Cuba	65.24A	Scott Neilson; Canada	64.56A
1979	Scott Neilson; Canada	69.64	Armando Orozco; Cuba	68.48	Genovevo Morejón; Cuba	67.66
1983	Genovevo Morejón; Cuba	65.34	Harold Willers; Canada	64.22	Alfredo Luis; Cuba	63.16
1987	Jud Logan; United States	77.24	Andrés Charadía; Argentina	69.36	Vicente Sánchez; Cuba	66.02
1991	Jim Driscoll; United States	72.78	Jud Logan; United States	70.32	René Díaz; Cuba	68.36
1995	Lance Deal; United States	75.64	Alberto Sánchez; Cuba	73.94	Andrés Charadía; Argentina	71.78
1999	Lance Deal; United States	79.61 GR	Kevin McMahon; United States	73.41	Juan Ignacio Cerra; Argentina	70.68
2003	Juan Ignacio Cerra; Argentina	75.53	James Parker; United States	74.35	Yosvany Suárez; Cuba	70.24
2007	Jim Steacy; Canada	73.77	Kibwé Johnson; United States	73.23	Juan Ignacio Cerra; Argentina	72.12
2011	Kibwé Johnson; United States	79.63 GR	Michael Mai; United States	72.71	Noleysi Bicet; Cuba	72.57
2015	Kibwé Johnson; United States	75.46	Roberto Janet; Cuba	74.78	Conor McCullough; United States	73.74
2019	Gabriel Kehr; Chile	74.98	Humberto Mansilla; Chile	74.38	Sean Donnelly; United States	74.23
2023	Ethan Katzberg; Canada	80.96 GR	Daniel Haugh; United States	77.82	Rudy Winkler; United States	76.65

=== Javelin throw ===
Games	Gold		Silver		Bronze	
1951	Ricardo Héber; Argentina	68.08	Steve Seymour; United States	67.08	Horst Walter; Argentina	66.33
1955	Bud Held; United States	69.77A	Ricardo Héber; Argentina	66.15A	Reinaldo Oliver; Puerto Rico	65.56A
1959	Buster Quist; United States	70.50	Phil Conley; United States	69.94	Al Cantello; United States	69.82
1963	Dan Studney; United States	75.60	Nick Kovalakides; United States	73.71	Walter de Almeida; Brazil	64.61
1967	Frank Covelli; United States	74.28	Gary Stenlund; United States	74.28	Justo Perelló; Cuba	71.96
1971	Cary Feldmann; United States	81.52	Bill Skinner; United States	80.36	Amado Morales; Puerto Rico	76.14
1975	Sam Colson; United States	83.82A	Juan Jarvis; Cuba	82.30A	Raúl Fernández; Cuba	72.90A
1979	Duncan Atwood; United States	84.16	Antonio González; Cuba	84.12	Raúl Pupo; Cuba	81.96
1983	Laslo Babits; Canada	81.40	Ramón González; Cuba	78.34	Amado Morales; Puerto Rico	77.40
1987	Duncan Atwood; United States	78.68	Ramón González; Cuba	75.58	Juan de la Garza; Mexico	73.76
1991	Ramón González; Cuba	79.12	Mike Barnett; United States	77.40	Luis Lucumí; Colombia	77.38
1995	Emeterio González; Cuba	79.28	Edgar Baumann; Paraguay	78.70	Todd Riech; United States	77.82
1999	Emeterio González; Cuba	77.46	Máximo Rigondeaux; Cuba	76.24	Tom Petranoff; United States	75.95
2003	Emeterio González; Cuba	81.72	Isbel Luaces; Cuba	80.95	Breaux Greer; United States	79.21
2007	Guillermo Martínez; Cuba	77.66	Mike Hazle; United States	75.33	Alexon Maximiano; Brazil	75.04
2011	Guillermo Martínez; Cuba	87.20 GR, NR	Cyrus Hostetler; United States	82.24 SB	Braian Toledo; Argentina	79.53 PB
2015	Keshorn Walcott; Trinidad and Tobago	83.27	Riley Dolezal; United States	81.62 SB	Júlio César de Oliveira; Brazil	80.94
2019	Anderson Peters; Grenada	87.31 GR	Keshorn Walcott; Trinidad and Tobago	83.55	Albert Reynolds; Saint Lucia	82.19 PB
2023	Curtis Thompson; United States	79.65	Pedro Henrique Rodrigues; Brazil	78.45	Leslain Baird; Guyana	78.23

=== Decathlon ===
Games	Gold		Silver		Bronze	
1951	Hernán Figueroa; Chile	6610	Hernán Alzamora; Peru	6063	Enrique Salazar; Guatemala	4380
1955	Rafer Johnson; United States	6994A	Bob Richards; United States	6886A	Hernán Figueroa; Chile	5740A
1959	Dave Edstrom; United States	7254	Phil Mulkey; United States	6062	George Stulac; Canada	5989
1963	John David Martin; United States	7335	Bill Gairdner; Canada	6812	Héctor Thomas; Venezuela	6751
1967	Bill Toomey; United States	8044	Héctor Thomas; Venezuela	7312	Dave Thoreson; United States	7295
1971	Rick Wanamaker; United States	7648	Russ Hodge; United States	7314	Jesús Mirabal; Cuba	7295
1975	Bruce Jenner; United States	8045A	Fred Dixon; United States	8019A	Jesús Mirabal; Cuba	7582A
1979	Bobby Coffman; United States	8078	Tito Steiner; Argentina	7638	Zenon Smiechowski; Canada	7337
1983	Dave Steen; Canada	7958	Douglas Fernández; Venezuela	7726 (NR)	Freddy Aberdeen; Venezuela	7262
1987	Mike Gonzales; United States	7649	Keith Robinson; United States	7573	Gordon Orlikow; Canada	7441
1991	Pedro da Silva; Brazil	7762	Eugenio Balanqué; Cuba	7726	Sheldon Blockburger; United States	7363
1995	Kip Janvrin; United States	8049	Eugenio Balanqué; Cuba	7948	Alejandro Cárdenas; Mexico	7387
1999	Chris Huffins; United States	8170 GR	Dan Steele; United States	8070	Raúl Duany; Cuba	7730
2003	Stephen Moore; United States	7809	Luiggy Llanos; Puerto Rico	7704 (NR)	Yonelvis Águila; Cuba	7593
2007	Maurice Smith; Jamaica	8278 GR PB	Yordanis García; Cuba	8113	Carlos Chinin; Brazil	7977
2011	Leonel Suárez; Cuba	8373 GR	Maurice Smith; Jamaica	8214 SB	Yordanis García; Cuba	8074
2015	Damian Warner; Canada	8659 GR NR	Kurt Felix; Grenada	8269 PB	Luiz Alberto de Araújo; Brazil	8179 SB
2019	Damian Warner; Canada	8513	Lindon Victor; Grenada	8240	Pierce LePage; Canada	8161
2023	Santiago Ford; Chile	7834	José Ferreira; Brazil	7748	Ryan Talbot; United States	7742
