= 1960 United States Olympic trials (track and field) =

1960 United States Olympic track and field trials
- Dates: July 1-2
- Host city: Stanford, United States
- Venue: Stanford Stadium
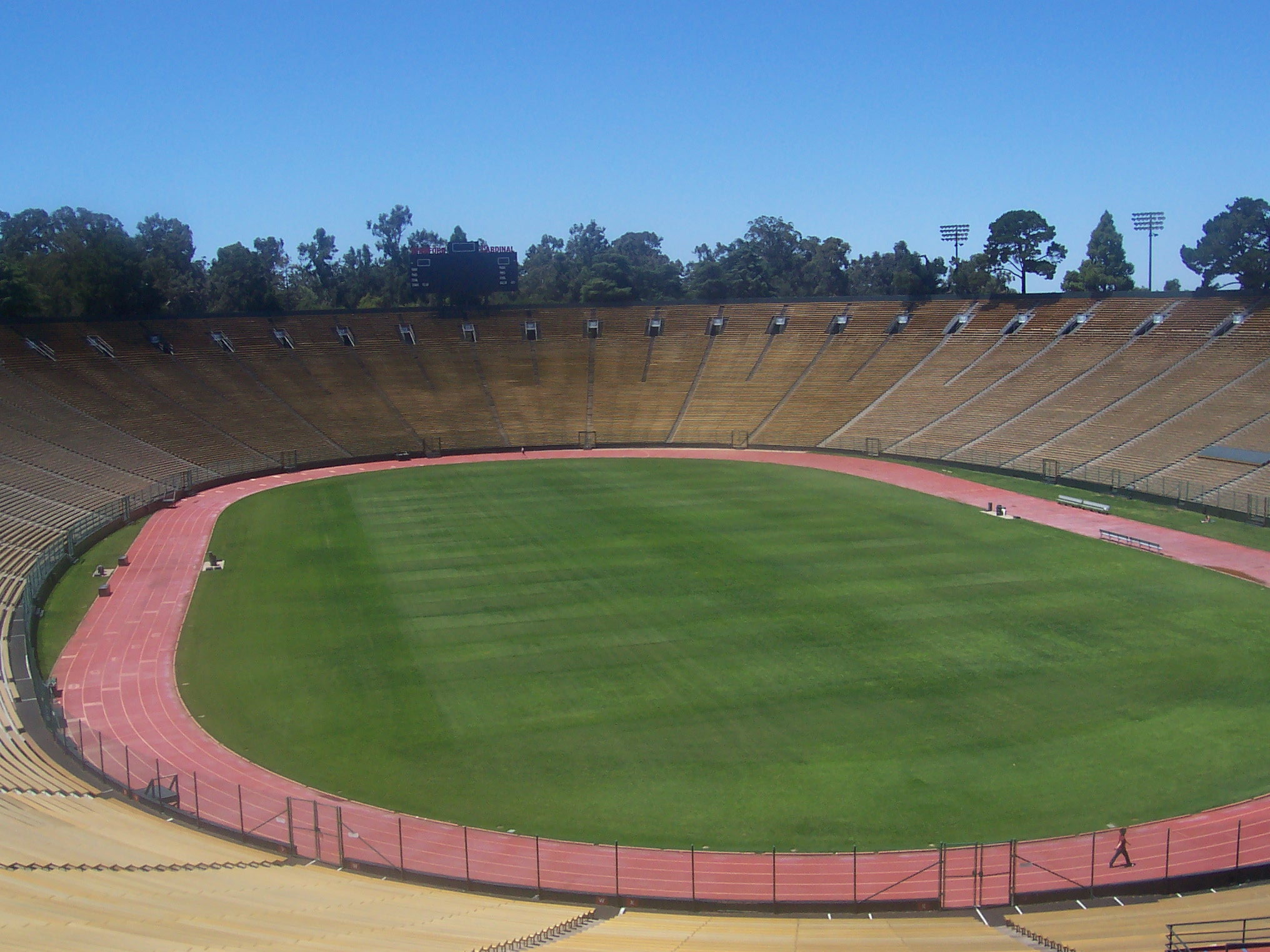
- Level: Senior
- Type: Outdoor

The men's 1960 United States Olympic trials for track and field for men were held at the Stanford Stadium at Stanford University in California, between July 1 and 2. The 20 kilometer walk trials were held in Baltimore, Maryland, on July 17, and the 50 kilometer walk trials were held on July 3 in Pittsburgh, Pennsylvania. Two marathon trials were held between two races, the AAU National Championships in Yonkers, New York, on May 22 and the Boston Marathon in Boston, Massachusetts, on April 19. As it turned out, the three selectees were the top 3 at Yonkers, but that is because Gordon McKenzie was also the first American finisher at Boston.

The 10,000 meters was held during a heat wave in Bakersfield, California on July 24-25. Because of the temperatures, still 80 °F (27 °C) at midnight, the race began at 11:58 p.m. on the 24th so the bulk of the race took place technically on the 25th. Several international athletes were allowed to participate in hopes of drawing the Americans to fast times, but the heat dashed those plans.

The decathlon was held a week after the trials, allowing athletes to make attempts at individual events. Rafer Johnson threw the javelin, Bob Gutowski tried to qualify in the pole vault, and Mike Herman attempted the long jump. While Herman failed to get a legal attempt in the long jump, a week later his World Decathlon Best 26'3" would have chased Ralph Boston and certainly would have been good enough to qualify. American resident, but Taiwanese citizen C. K. Yang was allowed to participate in the decathlon, where he pushed his college teammate Rafer Johnson to the world record, but his performance did not displace the American athletes in the trials. The process was organized by the AAU.

The women's Olympic trials were held separately in Abilene, Texas between July 15 and 16.

== Men's results ==
Key: ≠ Athlete without "A" standard, not selected.

=== Men track events ===
Event	Gold		Silver		Bronze	
100 meters	Ray Norton	10.4	Frank Budd	10.4	Dave Sime	10.4
200 meters	Ray Norton	20.5 =WR	Stone Johnson	20.8	Les Carney	20.9
400 meters	Jack Yerman	46.3	Earl Young	46.5	Otis Davis	46.7
800 meters	Tom Murphy	1:46.7	Jerry Siebert	1:46.8	Ernie Cunliffe	1:47.5
1500 meters	Dyrol Burleson	3:46.9	Jim Grelle	3:47.4	Pete Close	3:49.0
5000 meters	Jim Beatty	14:13.6	Bill Dellinger	14:13.8	Bob Soth	14:18.6
10,000 meters	Al Lawrence Australia; Max Truex	30:11.4; 30:16.3	Doug Kyle Canada; Pete McArdle	30:12.6; 30:22.0	Bob Soth	30:26.5
110 m hurdles	Lee Calhoun	13.4 =NR	Willie May	13.5	Hayes Jones	13.5
400 m hurdles	Glenn Davis	49.5	Dick Howard	49.8	Cliff Cushman	49.9
3000 m s'chase	George Young	8:50.6	Phil Coleman	8:51.0	Deacon Jones	8:52.5
20K racewalk	Rudy Haluza	1:34:12	Alex Oakley Canada; Ron Zinn	1:34:55; 1:35:58	Bob Mimm	1:36:07
50K racewalk	Ron Laird	4:40:09	John Allen	4:41:36	Bruce MacDonald	4:45:42
Boston Marathon	Paavo Kotila Finland; Gordon McKenzie	2:20:54; 2:22:18	Jim Green	2:23:37	Al Confalone	2:26:30
Yonkers Marathon	John J. Kelley	2:20:13.6	Gordon McKenzie	2:23:46	Alex Breckenridge	2:32:41

=== Men field events ===
Event	Gold		Silver		Bronze	
High jump	John Thomas	2.23 m (7 ft 3 3/4 in)WR	Joe Faust	7 ft 0 in (2.13 m)=WJR	Charles Dumas	6 ft 11 in (2.1 m)
Pole vault	Don Bragg	4.80 m (15 ft 8 3/4 in)WR	Ron Morris	4.70 m (15 ft 5 in)	Dave Clark	4.65 m (15 ft 3 in)
Long jump	Ralph Boston	8.09 m (26 ft 6 1/2 in)w	Anthony Watson	7.85 m (25 ft 9 in)	Irv Roberson	7.75 m (25 ft 5 in)
Triple jump	Ira Davis	16.18 m (53 ft 1 in)	Herm Stokes	15.82 m (51 ft 10 3/4 in)w	Bill Sharpe	15.79 m (51 ft 9 1/2 in)w
Shot put	Dallas Long	19.74 m (64 ft 9 in)	Parry O'Brien	19.25 m (63 ft 1 3/4 in)	Dave Davis	19.45 m (63 ft 9 1/2 in)
Discus throw	Rink Babka	58.61 m (192 ft 3 in)	Al Oerter	57.38 m (188 ft 3 in)	Dick Cochran	55.45 m (181 ft 11 in)
Hammer throw	Al Hall	65.41 m (214 ft 7 in)	Hal Connolly	64.71 m (212 ft 3 in)	Ed Bagdonas	62.76 m (205 ft 10 in)
Javelin throw	Al Cantello	84.61 m (277 ft 7 in)	Bill Alley	82.18 m (269 ft 7 in)	Terry Beucher	78.00 m (255 ft 10 in)
Decathlon	Rafer Johnson	8683 WR	C. K. Yang Taiwan; Phil Mulkey	8426 =AR; 7652	Dave Edstrom	7530

== Women's results ==
=== Women track events ===
Event	Gold		Silver		Bronze	
100 meters	Wilma Rudolph	11.5 =NR	Barbara Jones	11.6	Martha Hudson	11.7
200 meters	Wilma Rudolph	23.9	Lucinda Williams	24.3	Ernestine Pollards	24.5
800 meters	Pat Daniels	2:15.6 NR	Rosie Lovelace	2:15.7	Doris Severtsen	2:17.6
80 m hurdles Wind aided	Shirley Crowder	11.4w	Jo Ann Terry	11.4w	Irene Robertson	11.4w

=== Women field events ===
Event	Gold		Silver		Bronze	
High jump	Naomi Rogers	5 ft 4 in (1.62 m)	Barbara Brown	5 ft 2 3/4 in (1.59 m)	Jean Gaertner	5 ft 2 3/4 in (1.59 m)
Long jump	Willye White	6.21 m (20 ft 4 1/4 in) NR	Sandra Smith	5.69 m (18 ft 8 in)	Anna Smith	5.64 m (18 ft 6 in)
Shot put	Earlene Brown	15.49 m (50 ft 9 3/4 in)	Sharon Shepherd	13.97 m (45 ft 10 in)	Cecilia Rutledge	13.23 m (43 ft 4 3/4 in)
Discus throw	Earlene Brown	53.90 m (176 ft 10 in) NR	Olga Connolly	52.54 m (172 ft 4 in)	Pamela Kurrell	48.36 m (158 ft 7 in)
Javelin throw	Karen Anderson Oldham	49.82 m (163 ft 5 in)NR	Peggy Scholler	47.89 m (157 ft 1 in)	Karen Mendyka	43.79 m (143 ft 8 in)
