= 1962 USA Outdoor Track and Field Championships =

National athletics championship event

- Dates: 22–23 June (men); 7–8 July (women)
- Host city: Walnut, California (men); Los Angeles, California (women)
- Venue: Mt. San Antonio College, Hilmer Lodge Stadium (men); Memorial Coliseum (women)
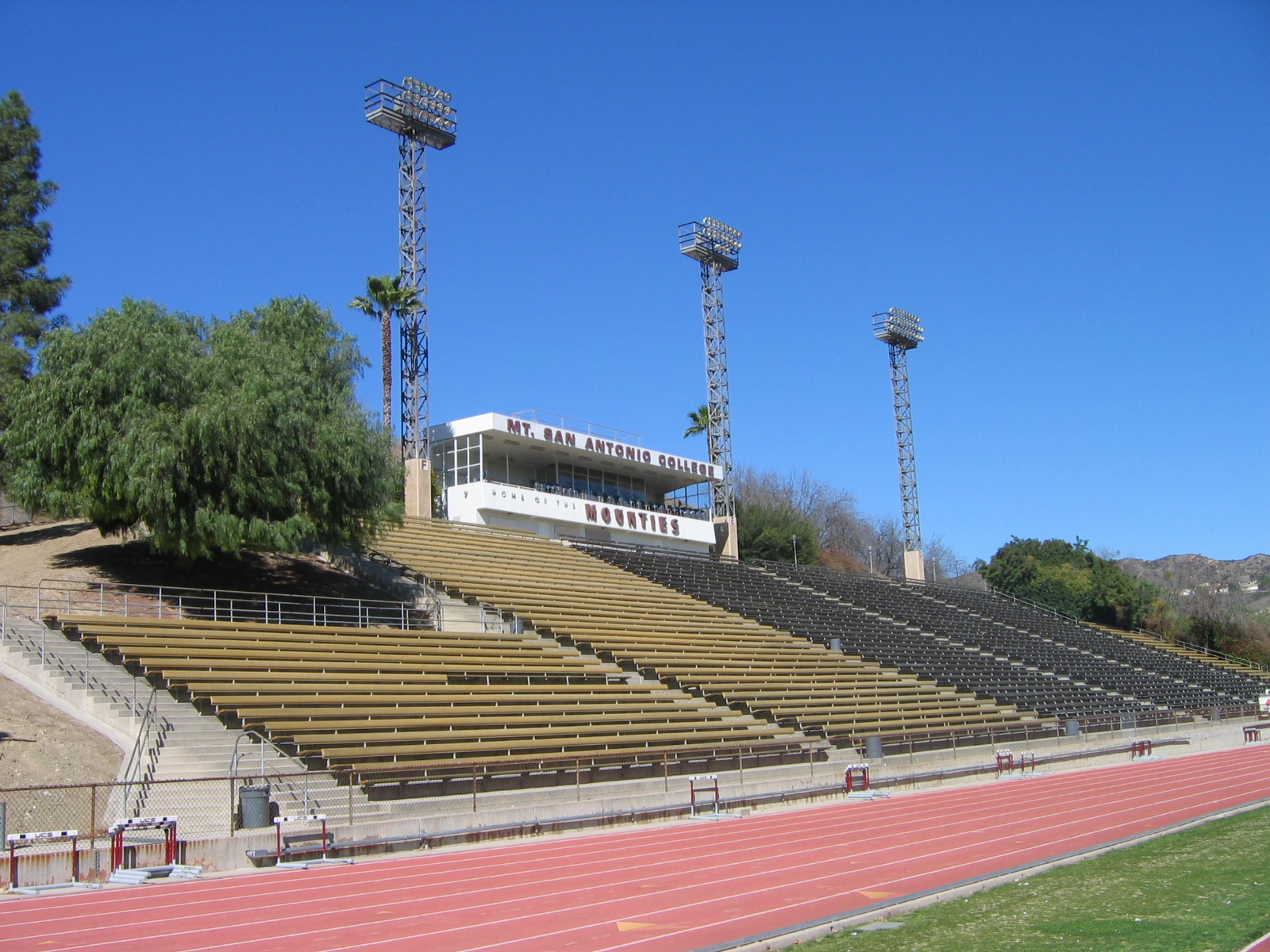
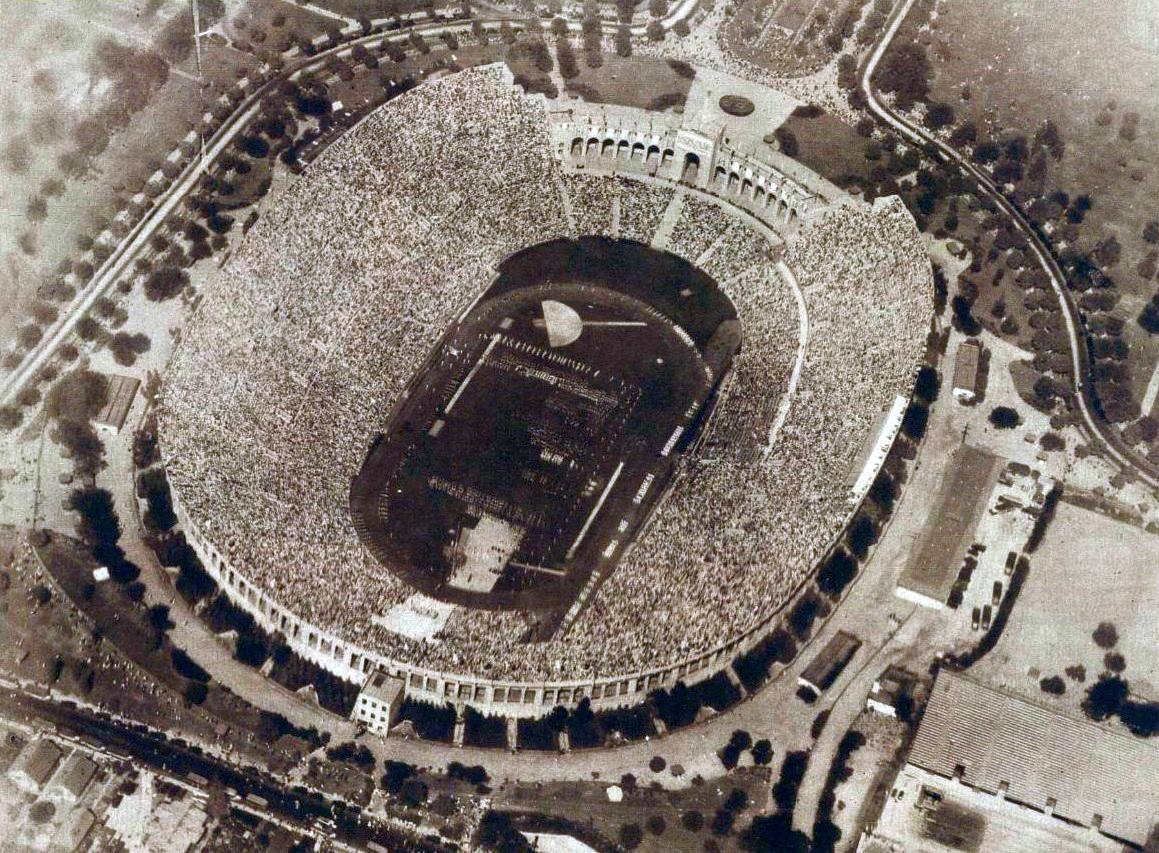

The 1962 USA Outdoor Track and Field Championships were organized by the Amateur Athletic Union (AAU) and served as the national championships in outdoor track and field for the United States.

The men's edition was held at Mt. San Antonio College, Hilmer Lodge Stadium in Walnut, California, and it took place 22–23 June. The women's meet was held separately at the Memorial Coliseum in Los Angeles, California on 7–8 July.

At the championships, Paul Drayton and Henry Carr equaled the 220 yards world record. The weather was described as fine. Between 8,000 and 10,000 spectators attended per day. The women's edition was significant as it marked the first championships that were held at a large-scale venue.

== Results ==
=== Men ===
Event	Gold		Silver		Bronze	
100 yards	Bob Hayes	9.3	Harry Jerome (CAN)	9.4	Roger Sayers	9.4
220 yards	Paul Drayton	20.5	Roger Sayers	20.8	Homer Jones	20.8
440 yards	Ulis Williams	45.8	Ray Saddler	46.2	George Kerr (JAM)	46.3
880 yards	Jerry Siebert	1:47.1	Jim Dupree	1:47.6	John Reilly	1:47.7
1 mile	Jim Beatty	3:57.9	Jim Grelle	3:58.1	Cary Weisiger	3:58.1
3 miles	Murray Halberg (NZL)	13:30.6	Max Truex	13:32.8	Bruce Kidd (CAN)	13:33.8
6 miles	Bruce Kidd (CAN)	28:23.2	Pete McArdle	28:34.8	John Gutknecht	28:39.8
Marathon	John J. Kelley	2:27:39.8	Alex Breckenridge	2:30:40.0	George Terry	2:32:21.0
120 yards hurdles	Jerry Tarr	13.4	Hayes Jones	13.4	Blaine Lindgren	13.7
220 yards hurdles	Jerry Tarr	22.6				
440 yards hurdles	Willie Atterberry	50.5	Warren Cawley	50.6	Russ Rogers	51.1
3000 m steeplechase	George Young	8:48.2	Keith Forman	8:52.2	Pat Traynor	8:56.6
2 miles walk	Ron Zinn	13:45.8				
High jump	John Thomas	2.08 m	Gene Johnson	2.08 m	Bob Avant	2.08 m
Pole vault	Ron Morris	4.88 m	John Cramer	4.78 m	Dave Tork	4.78 m
Long jump	Ralph Boston	8.08 m	Paul Warfield	7.78 m	Darrell Horn	7.70 m
Triple jump	Bill Sharpe	15.88 m	Herman Stokes	15.57 m	Kermit Alexander	15.49 m
Shot put	Gary Gubner	19.37 m	Dallas Long	19.23 m	Dave Davis	18.22 m
Discus throw	Alfred Oerter	61.62 m	Rink Babka	58.94 m	Dave Weill	57.97 m
Hammer throw	Albert Hall	66.83 m	Hal Connolly	65.62 m	Ted Bailey	59.51 m
Javelin throw	Dan Studney	75.13 m	Nick Kovalakides	74.93 m	Jerry Dyes	74.69 m
Pentathlon	Paul Herman	3389 pts				
All-around decathlon	Tom Pagani	8265 pts				
Decathlon	Chuan-Kwang Yang (TWN)	8249 pts	Paul Herman	7673 pts	Steve Pauly	7226 pts

=== Women ===
Event	Gold		Silver		Bronze	
100 yards	Wilma Rudolph	10.8	Edith McGuire	10.9	Vivian Brown	11.1
220 yards	Vivian Brown	24.1	Carol Smith	24.8	Janell Smith	25.0
440 yards	Suzanne Knott	58.1	Carol Bush	58.3	Ann Tegelius	58.7
880 yards	Leah Bennett	2:12.3	Sandra Knott	2:14.5	Suzanne Pfeiger	2:16.6
80 m hurdles	Cherrie Parrish	11.3	Ikuko Yoda (JPN)	11.3	JoAnn Terry	11.6
High jump	Kinuko Tsutsumi (JPN)	1.60 m	Barbara Browne	1.57 m	Rose Robinson	1.57 m
Long jump	Willye White	6.17 m	Fumiko Ito (JPN)	5.95 m	Sachiko Kishioto (JPN)	5.94 m
Shot put	Earlene Brown	14.90 m	Cynthia Wyatt	14.78 m	Sharon Shepherd	14.69 m
Discus throw	Olga Connolly	52.47 m	Earlene Brown	47.06 m	Seiko Obonai (JPN)	45.79 m
Javelin throw	Karen Mendyka	48.28 m	RaNae Bair	46.51 m	Fran Davenport	44.40 m
Women's pentathlon	Billie Pat Daniels	3941 pts	Kathy Facciollli	3877 pts	Linda DeLong	3775 pts

== See also ==
- List of USA Outdoor Track and Field Championships winners (men)
- List of USA Outdoor Track and Field Championships winners (women)
