= Athletics at the 1963 Pan American Games – Men's 400 metres =

Men's 400 metres at the Pan American Games

The men's 400 metres event at the 1963 Pan American Games was held at the Pacaembu Stadium in São Paulo on 27 and 28 April.

== Medalists ==
Gold	Silver	Bronze
James Johnson; United States	Mel Spence; Jamaica	Clifton Bertrand; Trinidad and Tobago

== Results ==
=== Heats ===
Rank	Heat	Name	Nationality	Time	Notes
1	1	Hortensio Fucil	Venezuela	47.41	Q
2	1	Earl Young	United States	47.85	Q
3	2	James Johnson	United States	48.85	Q
4	2	Clifton Bertrand	Trinidad and Tobago	49.06	Q
5	3	Mel Spence	Jamaica	49.54	Q
6	2	Peter Ostermeyer	Brazil	49.95	
7	1	Geraldo Costa	Brazil	50.12	
8	1	Victor Gadea	Uruguay	50.19	
9	3	Didier Mejía	Mexico	54.75	Q
	1	Alejandro Arroyo	Ecuador	DNS	
	1	German Guenard	Puerto Rico	DNS	
	2	Malcolm Spence	Jamaica	DNS	
	2	Victor Flores	Venezuela	DNS	
	3	Jaime Frasser	Ecuador	DNS	
	3	Juan Carlos Dyrzka	Argentina	DNS	
	3	Edwin Roberts	Trinidad and Tobago	DNS	

=== Final ===
Rank	Name	Nationality	Time	Notes
1st place, gold medalist(s)	James Johnson	United States	46.80	
2nd place, silver medalist(s)	Mel Spence	Jamaica	46.94	
3rd place, bronze medalist(s)	Clifton Bertrand	Trinidad and Tobago	47.43	
4	Didier Mejía	Mexico	48.28	
5	Hortensio Fucil	Venezuela	48.58	
	Earl Young	United States	DNS	
