= Athletics at the 1963 Pan American Games – Men's marathon =

Men's marathon at the Pan American Games

The men's marathon event at the 1963 Pan American Games was held at the Pacaembu Stadium in São Paulo on 4 May.

== Results ==
Rank	Name	Nationality	Time	Notes
1st place, gold medalist(s)	Fidel Negrete	Mexico	2:27:56	
2nd place, silver medalist(s)	Gordon McKenzie	United States	2:31:18	
3rd place, bronze medalist(s)	Pete McArdle	United States	2:34:14	
4	José Campos	Brazil	2:42:45	
5	Dorival da Silva	Brazil	2:45:06	
6	Pedro Alvarado	Mexico	2:49:06	
	Doug Kyle	Canada	DNF	
	Ramnarine	British Guiana	DNF	
	Ricardo Vidal	Chile	DNF	
