= Athletics at the 1963 Pan American Games – Men's 4 × 400 metres relay =

Men's 4 × 400 metres relay at the Pan American Games

The men's 4 × 400 metres relay event at the 1963 Pan American Games was held at the Pacaembu Stadium in São Paulo on 4 May.

== Results ==
Rank	Nation	Athletes	Time	Notes
1st place, gold medalist(s)	United States	Ollan Cassell, James Johnson, Richard Edmunds, Earl Young	3:09.62	
2nd place, silver medalist(s)	Venezuela	Aristedes Pineda, Leslie Mentor, Víctor Maldonado, Hortensio Fucil	3:12.20	
3rd place, bronze medalist(s)	Jamaica	Anthony Carr, Rupert Hoilette, Malcolm Spence, Mel Spence	3:12.61	
4	Brazil	Carlos Mossa, Anubes da Silva, Geraldo Costa, Paulo de Araújo	3:17.1	
