= Athletics at the 1963 Pan American Games =

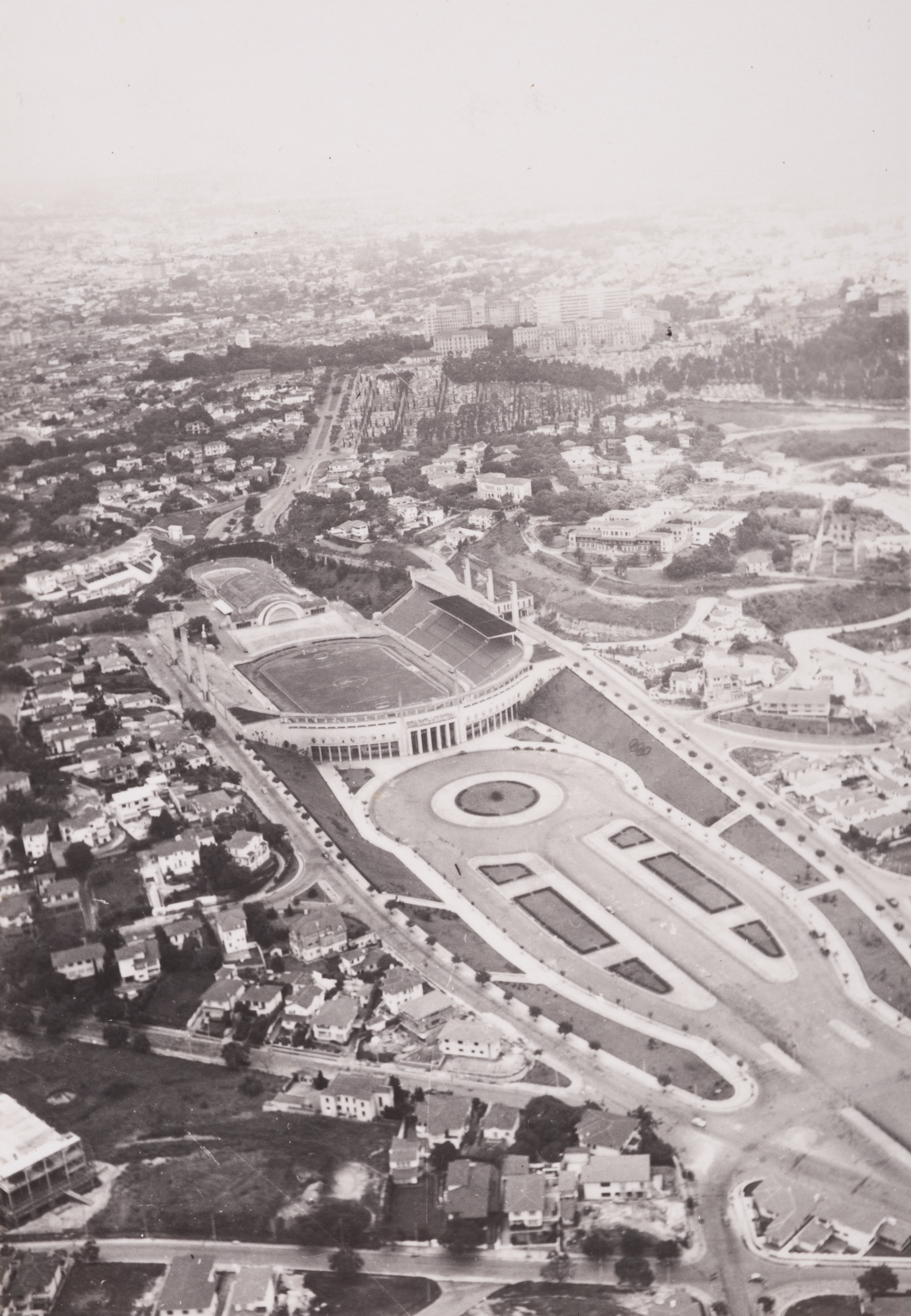
- Dates: 27 April – 4 May
- Host city: São Paulo, Brazil
- Venue: Pacaembu Stadium
- Level: Senior
- Events: 33
- Participation: 212 athletes from 20 nations

The athletics competition at the 1963 Pan American Games was held in São Paulo, Brazil.

== Medal summary ==
=== Men's events ===
Event	Gold		Silver		Bronze	
100 metres	Enrique Figuerola; Cuba	10.46	Arquímedes Herrera; Venezuela	10.59	Ira Murchison; United States	10.62
200 metres	Rafael Romero; Venezuela	21.23	Ollan Cassell; United States	21.23	Arquímedes Herrera; Venezuela	21.23
400 metres	James Johnson; United States	46.80	Mel Spence; Jamaica	46.94	Clifton Bertrand; Trinidad and Tobago	47.43
800 metres	Don Bertoia; Canada	1:48.46	Sig Ohlemann; Canada	1:48.63	Ernie Cunliffe; United States	1:48.92
1500 metres	Jim Grelle; United States	3:43.62	Jim Beatty; United States	3:43.88	Don Bertoia; Canada	3:55.19
5000 metres	Osvaldo Suárez; Argentina	14:25.81	Charley Clark; United States	14:27.16	Bob Schul; United States	14:29.21
10,000 metres	Pete McArdle; United States	29:52.22	Osvaldo Suárez; Argentina	30:26.56	Eligio Galicia; Mexico	30:27.90
Marathon	Fidel Negrete; Mexico	2:27:56	Gordon McKenzie; United States	2:31:18	Pete McArdle; United States	2:34:14
110 metres hurdles	Blaine Lindgren; United States	13.8w	Willie May; United States	14.0w	Lázaro Betancourt; Cuba	14.3w
400 metres hurdles	Juan Carlos Dyrzka; Argentina	50.32	Willie Atterberry; United States	50.49	Russ Rogers; United States	51.19
3000 metres steeplechase	Jeff Fishback; United States	9:07.9	Sebastião Mendes; Brazil	9:12.8	Albertino Etchechury; Uruguay	9:17.3
4 × 100 metres relay	United States; Earl Young; Ollan Cassell; Brooks Johnson; Ira Murchison	40.40	Venezuela; Héctor Thomas; Horacio Esteves; Arquímides Herrera; Rafael Romero	40.71	Trinidad and Tobago; Clifton Bertrand; Anthony Jones; Irving Joseph; Cipriani Phillip	40.87
4 × 400 metres relay	United States; Ollan Cassell; James Johnson; Richard Edmunds; Earl Young	3:09.62	Venezuela; Aristedes Pineda; Leslie Mentor; Víctor Maldonado; Hortensio Fucil	3:12.20	Jamaica; Anthony Carr; Rupert Hoilette; Malcolm Spence; Mel Spence	3:12.61
20 kilometres walk	Alex Oakley; Canada	1:42:44	Nicole Marrone; Canada	1:46:35	Ron Zinn; United States	1:49:45
High jump	Gene Johnson; United States	2.11	Teodoro Palacios; Guatemala	2.04	Anton Norris; Barbados	2.04
Pole vault	Dave Tork; United States	4.90	Henry Wadsworth; United States	4.75	Rubén Cruz; Puerto Rico	4.30
Long jump	Ralph Boston; United States	8.11	Darrell Horn; United States	8.02	Juan Muñoz; Venezuela	7.46
Triple jump	Bill Sharpe; United States	15.15	Ramón López; Cuba	15.08	Mário Gomes; Brazil	14.97
Shot put	Dave Davis; United States	18.52	Billy Joe; United States	17.77	Cosme Di Cursi; Argentina	16.26
Discus throw	Bob Humphreys; United States	57.82	Dave Davis; United States	51.05	Ben Rebel Bout; Netherlands Antilles	49.78
Hammer throw	Al Hall; United States	62.74	Jim Pryde; United States	58.56	Roberto Chapchap; Brazil	57.92
Javelin throw	Dan Studney; United States	75.60	Nick Kovalakides; United States	73.71	Walter de Almeida; Brazil	64.61
Decathlon	J. D. Martin; United States	7335	Bill Gairdner; Canada	6812	Héctor Thomas; Venezuela	6751

=== Women's events ===
Event	Gold		Silver		Bronze	
100 metres	Edith McGuire; United States	11.65	Miguelina Cobián; Cuba	11.69	Marilyn White; United States	11.85
200 metres	Vivian Brown; United States	23.9	Miguelina Cobián; Cuba	24.0	Lorraine Dunn; Panama	24.7
800 metres	Abby Hoffman; Canada	2:10.27	Leah Bennett Ferris; United States	2:13.79	Noreen Deuling; Canada	2:14.98
80 metres hurdles	Jo Ann Terry; United States	11.37	Jenny Wingerson; Canada	11.48	Wanda dos Santos; Brazil	11.50
4 × 100 metres relay	United States; Marilyn White; Vivian Brown; Willye White; Norma Harris	45.72	Cuba; Fulgencia Romay; Miguelina Cobián; Irene Martínez; Nereida Borges	46.44 NR	Brazil; Leontina Santos; Érica Lopes da Silva; Edir Braga Ribeiro; Inês Pimenta	48.18
High jump	Eleanor Montgomery; United States	1.68	Diane Gerace; Canada	1.65	Patsy Callender; Barbados	1.62
Long jump	Willye White; United States	6.15	Iris dos Santos; Brazil	5.65	Edith McGuire; United States	5.48
Shot put	Nancy McCredie; Canada	15.32	Cynthia Wyatt; United States	14.27	Sharon Shepherd; United States	14.10
Discus throw	Nancy McCredie; Canada	50.18	Ingeborg Pfüller; Argentina	47.83	Sharon Shepherd; United States	47.29
Javelin throw	Marlene Ahrens; Chile	49.93	Frances Davenport; United States	47.22	Íris dos Santos; Brazil	35.51

== Medal table ==
Rank	Nation	Gold	Silver	Bronze	Total
1	United States (USA)	22	15	10	47
2	Canada (CAN)	5	5	2	12
3	Argentina (ARG)	2	2	1	5
4	Cuba (CUB)	1	4	1	6
5	Venezuela (VEN)	1	3	3	7
6	Mexico (MEX)	1	0	1	2
7	Chile (CHI)	1	0	0	1
8	Brazil (BRA)	0	2	6	8
9	Jamaica (JAM)	0	1	1	2
10	Guatemala (GUA)	0	1	0	1
11	Barbados (BAR)	0	0	2	2
11	Trinidad and Tobago (TTO)	0	0	2	2
13	Netherlands Antilles (AHO)	0	0	1	1
13	Panama (PAN)	0	0	1	1
13	Puerto Rico (PUR)	0	0	1	1
13	Uruguay (URU)	0	0	1	1
Totals (16 entries)		33	33	33	99

== Participating nations ==
- Argentina (7)
- Barbados (3)
- Bermuda (1)
- Brazil (54)
- British Guiana (1)
- Canada (17)
- Chile (7)
- Cuba (15)
- Ecuador (2)
- Guatemala (1)
- Jamaica (4)
- Mexico (8)
- Netherlands Antilles (1)
- Panama (4)
- Peru (5)
- Puerto Rico (5)
- Trinidad and Tobago (9)
- United States (52)
- Uruguay (3)
- Venezuela (13)
