= Terry Beucher =

American javelin thrower

Personal information
- Nationality: American
- Born: February 19, 1937 (age 89) Farmersburg, Iowa, United States

Sport
- Sport: Athletics
- Event: Javelin throw

Terry Beucher (born February 19, 1937) is an American former athlete. He competed in the men's javelin throw at the 1960 Summer Olympics.

Beucher attended Shawnee Mission North High School in Overland Park, Kansas, where he played football, basketball, and threw the javelin and graduated in 1955. He received a scholarship to the Kansas Jayhawks track and field team, where he was overshadowed by teammate Bill Alley. He was nonetheless an All-American, finishing 3rd in the javelin at the 1960 NCAA track and field championships.

Beucher qualified for the 1960 Summer Olympics by finishing 3rd at the 1960 United States Olympic trials. He finished 13th in the first-round 'B' qualifying group.

Beucher majored in petroleum engineering. He and his father Charles Beucher were airline pilots. He became a lieutenant in the Air Force Reserve Officer Training Corps after college graduation.
