= James Johnson (sprinter) =

American sprinter

Medal record

Men's athletics

Representing the United States

Pan American Games
Gold medal – first place	1963 São Paulo	400 m
Gold medal – first place	1963 São Paulo	4×400 m

James Allen "Jim" Johnson (23 March 1943 - 2009 or earlier) was an American former track and field sprinter who specialized in the 400-meter dash. His greatest achievement came while representing his country at the 1963 Pan American Games, where he won gold medals in the individual 400 m and 4 × 400-meter relay, alongside Ollan Cassell, Richard Edmunds and Earl Young.

An African-American, he attended Norfolk State University and was part of the track team for the Norfolk State Spartans, helping them twice to the Central Intercollegiate Athletic Association title. He was posthumously inducted into the Norfolk State Sports Hall of Fame in 2009.

== See also ==
- List of Pan American Games medalists in athletics (men)
