= Brooks Johnson =

American track coach and sprinter (1934–2024)

Medal record

Men's athletics

Representing the United States

Pan American Games
| Gold medal – first place | 1963 São Paulo | 4×100 metres relay |

Brooks Johnson (February 28, 1934 – June 29, 2024) was an American sprinter and track coach.

== Early life ==
Johnson was a track star for his high school in Plymouth, Massachusetts. His father shined shoes in Miami, Florida, and his mother was a housemaid.

== Life as an athlete ==
After high school, Johnson attended Tufts University. There he was a football halfback and kick returner. He described his track career there as having more "lowlights than highlights." He did achieve some success as an athlete there, including notably a gold medal as a member of the 4 × 100 m relay at the 1963 Pan American Games (with Ira Murchison, Ollan Cassell and Earl Young), but injury curtailed his career. He was not a member of the USA track team for the 1964 Olympics; he was involved in an automobile accident on the way to the qualifying meet at Stanford University.

== Early coaching career ==
Johnson earned a J.D. degree from the University of Chicago Law School. He never practiced as a lawyer, instead working for the Governmental Affairs Institute in the United States Department of State in Washington D.C. Johnson thought of being a corporate lawyer but when told by the lawyer father of a school friend that "Regardless of what I think personally, my partners will say there is no room for blacks in corporate law", he realized that this color bar would mean that the law was not for him.

While in Washington, Johnson started coaching high school athletes at St. Albans School, where he started in 1965 as coach, athletic director, and teacher of cultural anthropology and history. Johnson got the job at St. Albans when, as a community organizer, he confronted the headmaster, the late Charles S. Martin, and objected that he was running “an all-white school in a black town.” To the retort "What was his solution?", Johnson replied, "I am the solution." One of his pupils there was the promising young discus thrower, and future vice-president, Al Gore. His school lessons were also famed for their quirkiness. At St. Albans in 1970 he founded the Skip Grant program for students from traditionally under-represented backgrounds.

== Later coaching career ==
Johnson spent 12 years at St. Albans before moving on to the University of Florida (1975–79) as assistant track coach and then head coach at Stanford University (1979–92), succeeding coach Payton Jordan, and California Polytechnic State University (1993–96). At St. Albans, Johnson helped steer some 200 inner city boys to the prep school, via an opportunity he created called The RISK Program.

Johnson coached Olympians since 1960, beginning with 110-meter hurdles silver medalist Willie May. Since then, notable Olympians coached by Johnson include Esther Stroy (a 15-year-old girl he trained through a neighborhood track club to get to the 1968 Olympics), PattiSue Plumer, Evelyn Ashford, and Chandra Cheesborough. He also trained Olympians and record holders such as Lacey O'Neal, Fred Sowerby, Martin McGrady, Sheila Ingram, Larry Shipp and Ray Brown. Future actor Bobby Wisdom ("Bunny Colvin" on "The Wire", as Robert Wisdom) was a quarter miler for Johnson at St. Alban's. Future actor Clancy Brown (who portrayed the prison guard captain in "The Shawshank Redemption") was a St. Alban's shot putter trained by Johnson. In 1984 he was women's team coach for track and field at the Summer Games in Los Angeles and relay coach in 2008. Johnson was part of the U.S. Track and Field Olympic coaching staff in 1976, 1984, 2004, and 2008. Johnson was elected to the USA Track Coaches Hall of Fame in 1997. Johnson also was a former director of the ARCO Olympic Training Center for the United States Olympic Team (there at its opening in 2003–04) and acted as High Performance Division Chair for USA Track & Field.

== Later life ==
Johnson was hired by the Disney Corporation in 1996 "to jump-start a fledging sports program". He was still an active coach with a small, select group of athletes that has included Justin Gatlin, Tiffany Williams, and David Oliver. "It is actually quite easy because a lot of the problems have already been resolved," Johnson said of his athletes, "these people were outstanding with Olympic credentials before they ever came here, so they know their way to the podium. Our job is to retrace the steps back to the podium." Johnson was more recently based at the ESPN Wide World of Sports Complex at Walt Disney World, usually to be found in his "signature beige straw hat".

On the future, Johnson did not plan to retire, as he said, "I like kicking (butt). I like to win, my whole life has been competitive," and he would continue "until they throw dirt in my face".

Johnson lived in Windermere, Florida, and died June 29, 2024, at the age of 90.

== Accolades and awards ==
In 2018, Johnson was given the USA Track and Field Legend Coach Award.

In 2010, Johnson was named Nike Coach of the Year by USA Track and Field.

The Brooks Johnson Development Chair of the Year Award, is awarded annually to the outstanding chair within the USATF National Team Development Committee whose work has promoted, assisted and developed the event group(s) he/she has led. It is presented at the USA Track & Field National Convention, by the USATF National Team Development Committee, in honor of Coach Johnson and his past work with the USATF Development Committee.

== Criticism ==
In 1992, one of Johnson's former athletes at Stanford University went public with her criticisms of Johnson's treatment of students.
