= John David Martin =

American former track and field athlete (born 1939)

Medal record

Men's athletics

Representing the United States

Pan American Games
Gold medal – first place	1963 São Paulo	Decathlon

John David "J.D." Martin (born March 19, 1939) is an American former track and field athlete who competed in the pole vault and decathlon. His greatest achievement was a decathlon gold medal for the United States at the 1963 Pan American Games. He set a games record of 7335 points in the process, also a personal record. His personal record for the pole vault was 4.75 m (15 ft 7 in). His best finish nationally was third in the decathlon at the 1961 USA Outdoor Track and Field Championships.

Raised in Erick, Oklahoma, at collegiate level he competed for the Oklahoma Sooners and won the NCAA Men's Division I Outdoor Track and Field Championships in 1960. He quickly moved into coaching and served as the track and cross country running coach at the University of Oklahoma from 1964 to 1997. Over this period, he was coach to two Olympic gold medallists, 22 individual national champions and 171 collegiate All-Americans. He was inducted into the Oklahoma Sports Hall of Fame in 2005.

His alma mater set up the J.D. Martin Invitational track meet in 2006 in his honour.

== See also ==
- List of Pan American Games medalists in athletics (men)
