= Jeff Fishback =

American runner

Personal information
- Born: November 20, 1941 (age 84)
Medal record
Men's Athletics
Representing the United States
Pan American Games
Gold medal – first place	1963 São Paulo	3000 m Steeplechase

Jeffrey Mason Fishback (born November 20, 1941, in San Mateo, California) is a retired middle- and long-distance runner from the United States. He won the gold medal in the men's 3000 metres steeplechase event at the 1963 Pan American Games in Brazil.

Fishback represented his native country at the 1964 Summer Olympics in Tokyo, Japan. He was runner-up in the steeplechase at the 1962 NCAAs for San Jose State College coached by Lloyd (Bud) Winter. He had run earlier for the College of San Mateo. Fishback was affiliated with the Santa Clara Valley Youth Village.

== Personal Bests ==
- 2 miles – 8:50 (1962)
- Steeplechase – 8:40.4 (1964)
- 5,000 metres – 14:32.8 (1962)
