= Didier Mejía =

Mexican sprinter (born 1941)

Personal information
- Nationality: Mexican
- Born: 20 July 1941 (age 84)

Sport
- Sport: Sprinting
- Event: 400 metres

Didier Mejía Esquivel (born 20 July 1941) is a Mexican sprinter. He competed in the men's 400 metres at the 1964 Summer Olympics.
