= Hortensio Fucil =

Personal information
- Full name: Hortensio Fucil Herrera
- Born: February 8, 1939
- Died: April 30, 2018 (aged 79)
- Height: 1.78 m (5 ft 10 in)
- Weight: 76 kg (168 lb)
Medal record
Men's Athletics
Representing Venezuela
Central American and Caribbean Games
Silver medal – second place	1962 Kingston	400 metres

Hortensio Fucil Herrera (February 8, 1939 – April 30, 2018) was a track and field athlete from Venezuela. He competed in the short- and in the middle-distances. Fucil represented his native country at the 1964 Summer Olympics in Tokyo, Japan. He was second in the 1963 Pan American Games 4 × 400 metres relay (with Víctor Maldonado, Aristides Pineda and Leslie Mentor). In the 1963 Pan American Games Fucil finished fifth in the 400 metres.

== International competitions ==
Year	Competition	Venue	Position	Event	Notes
Representing Venezuela
1959	Pan American Games	Chicago, United States	5th (h)	4 × 400 m relay	3:17.8
1960	Ibero-American Games	Santiago, Chile	4th	400 m	48.7
1960	Ibero-American Games	Santiago, Chile	8th (h)	4 × 400 m relay	3:20.9
1961	South American Championships	Lima, Peru	– (h)	400 m	DQ
1961	South American Championships	Lima, Peru	1st	4 × 400 m relay	3:16.0
1961	Bolivarian Games	Barranquilla, Colombia	6th	400 m	53.3
1961	Bolivarian Games	Barranquilla, Colombia	1st	4 × 100 m relay	42.0
1962	Central American and Caribbean Games	Kingston, Jamaica	2nd	400 m	47.3
1962	Central American and Caribbean Games	Kingston, Jamaica	5th	4 × 400 m relay	3:19.1
1962	Ibero-American Games	Madrid, Spain	10th (sf)	400 m	50.4
1962	Ibero-American Games	Madrid, Spain	1st	4 × 400 m relay	3:15.4
1963	Pan American Games	São Paulo, Brazil	5th	400 m	48.58
1963	Pan American Games	São Paulo, Brazil	2nd	4 × 400 m relay	3:12.20
1963	South American Championships	Cali, Colombia	2nd	200 m	21.0
1963	South American Championships	Cali, Colombia	1st	400 m	46.7
1963	South American Championships	Cali, Colombia	1st	4 × 400 m relay	3:13.0
1964	Olympic Games	Tokyo, Japan	37th (h)	400 m	47.9
1964	Olympic Games	Tokyo, Japan	6th	4 × 100 m relay	39.5
1965	South American Championships	Rio de Janeiro, Brazil	2nd	200 m	21.6
1965	South American Championships	Rio de Janeiro, Brazil	4th	400 m	48.5
1965	South American Championships	Rio de Janeiro, Brazil	2nd	4 × 100 m relay	41.3
1965	South American Championships	Rio de Janeiro, Brazil	1st	4 × 400 m relay	3:14.5
1965	Bolivarian Games	Quito, Ecuador	2nd	4 × 400 m relay	3:12.3
1966	Central American and Caribbean Games	San Juan, Puerto Rico	19th (h)	100 m	11.0
1966	Central American and Caribbean Games	San Juan, Puerto Rico	24th (h)	200 m	23.2
1966	Central American and Caribbean Games	San Juan, Puerto Rico	4th	4 × 400 m relay	3:12.3

== Personal bests ==
- 100 metres – 10.4h (1964)
- 200 metres – 20.8h (Caracas 1964)
- 400 metres – 46.7h (Cali 1963)
