= Dan Studney =

American former track and field athlete (born 1941)

Medal record

Men's athletics

Representing the United States

Pan American Games
Gold medal – first place	1963 São Paulo	Javelin throw

Dan Studney (born January 30, 1941) is an American former track and field athlete who competed in the javelin throw. His greatest achievement was a gold medal for the United States at the 1963 Pan American Games. His personal best of 76.30 m (250 ft 3 3/4 in) (old javelin model) was achieved in Santa Barbara, California on March 30, 1963 .

While competing, he was part of the Santa Clara Valley Youth Village club. He won the 1962 javelin title at the USA Outdoor Track and Field Championships with a mark of 75.13 m (246 ft 5 3/4 in). He attended San Jose State University and under the tutelage of coach Bert Bonanno he was part of the San Jose State Spartans collegiate team.

Studney originally hailed from Hillside, New Jersey and graduated from Hillside High School in 1959, where he competed in football and wrestling, in addition to track and field.

== See also ==
- List of Pan American Games medalists in athletics (men)
