= Fidel Negrete =

Mexican long-distance runner

Personal information
- Born: March 23, 1932
- Died: November 17, 2016 (aged 84) Toluca, Mexico
- Height: 1.67 m (5 ft 6 in)
- Weight: 58 kg (128 lb)
Medal record
Men's Athletics
Representing Mexico
Pan American Games
Gold medal – first place	1963 Sao Paulo	Marathon
Central American and Caribbean Games
Silver medal – second place	1962 Kingston	Half Marathon

Fidel Negrete Gamboa (March 23, 1932 – November 17, 2016) was a long-distance runner from Mexico, whose biggest achievement during his career was winning the gold medal in the men's marathon at the 1963 Pan American Games. He represented his nation in the same event at the 1964 Summer Olympics in Tokyo, Japan, where he finished 21st in 2:26:07.

Negrete died on November 17, 2016, following a heart attack. He was 84.

== International competitions ==
Year	Competition	Venue	Position	Event	Notes
Representing Mexico
1962	Central American and Caribbean Games	Kingston, Jamaica	2nd	Half marathon	1:12:27
1963	Pan American Games	São Paulo, Brazil	1st	Marathon	2:27:56
1964	Olympic Games	Tokyo, Japan	21st	Marathon	2:26:07

== Personal bests ==
- Marathon – 2:26:07 (1964)
