= Mel Spence =

Jamaican sprinter and middle-distance runner

Personal information
- Born: Melville Spence; 2 January 1936 Kingston, Jamaica
- Died: 28 October 2012 (aged 76) Florida
Medal record
Men's athletics
Representing British West Indies
Pan American Games
| Gold medal – first place | 1959 Chicago | 4×400 m |
Representing Jamaica
Pan American Games
| Silver medal – second place | 1963 São Paulo | 400 m |
| Bronze medal – third place | 1963 São Paulo | 4×400 m |
Commonwealth Games
| Gold medal – first place | 1962 Perth | 4×440 yards |
Central American and Caribbean Games
| Gold medal – first place | 1962 Kingston | 4×400 m |
| Silver medal – second place | 1962 Kingston | 800 metres |

Melville Spence (2 January 1936 – 28 October 2012) was a Jamaican sprinter who competed in the 1956 Summer Olympics and in the 1964 Summer Olympics. He is the twin brother of Mal Spence, an Olympic sprint medalist.

He was a relay silver medalist at the 1955 Pan American Games and was runner-up in the individual 400 m event at the 1963 Pan American Games. He was part of the winning Jamaican 4×400 metres relay team at the 1962 Central American and Caribbean Games.

Both Mel and his twin brother were recruited to run for Arizona State University during the civil rights movement of the late 1950s, among the first international athletes to come to the US for athletics.

== International competitions ==
| Year | Competition | Venue | Position | Event | Notes |
Representing Jamaica
| 1955 | Pan American Games | Mexico City, Mexico | 6th (h) | 200 m | 22.19 |
| 1955 | Pan American Games | Mexico City, Mexico | 5th | 400 m | 48.84 |
| 1955 | Pan American Games | Mexico City, Mexico | 2nd | 4 × 400 m relay | 3:12.63 |
| 1956 | Olympic Games | Melbourne, Australia | 31st (h) | 200 m | 22.13 |
| 1956 | Olympic Games | Melbourne, Australia | 10th (sf) | 400 m | 47.58 |
| 1956 | Olympic Games | Melbourne, Australia | 8th (h) | 4 × 400 m relay | 3:11.0^{1} |
| 1957 | British West Indies Championships | Kingston, Jamaica | 2nd | 400 m | 47.6 |
| 1957 | British West Indies Championships | Kingston, Jamaica | 2nd | 800 m | 1:51.1 |
| 1957 | British West Indies Championships | Kingston, Jamaica | 1st | 4 × 100 m relay | 41.9 |
| 1957 | British West Indies Championships | Kingston, Jamaica | 1st | 4 × 400 m relay | 3:14.0 |
| 1958 | British Empire and Commonwealth Games | Cardiff, United Kingdom | 30th (h) | 440 y | 50.2 |
| 1959 | British West Indies Championships | Georgetown, British Guiana | 3rd | 400 m | |
| 1959 | British West Indies Championships | Georgetown, British Guiana | 3rd | 800 m | |
| 1959 | British West Indies Championships | Georgetown, British Guiana | 1st | 4 × 400 m relay | 3:09.5 |
| 1959 | Pan American Games^{1} | Chicago, United States | 4th | 800 m | 1:50.0 |
| 1959 | Pan American Games^{1} | Chicago, United States | 1st | 4 × 400 m relay | 3:05.3 |
| 1960 | British West Indies Championships | Kingston, Jamaica | 3rd | 400 m | 47.1 |
| 1962 | Central American and Caribbean Games | Kingston, Jamaica | 4th | 400 m | 47.7 |
| 1962 | Central American and Caribbean Games | Kingston, Jamaica | 2nd | 800 m | 1:53.0 |
| 1962 | Central American and Caribbean Games | Kingston, Jamaica | 1st | 4 × 400 m relay | 3:11.6 |
| 1962 | British Empire and Commonwealth Games | Perth, Australia | 6th | 440 y | 47.8 |
| 1962 | British Empire and Commonwealth Games | Perth, Australia | 13th (h) | 880 y | 1:52.3 |
| 1962 | British Empire and Commonwealth Games | Perth, Australia | 1st | 4 × 440 y relay | 3:10.2 |
| 1963 | Pan American Games | São Paulo, Brazil | 2nd | 400 m | 46.94 |
| 1963 | Pan American Games | São Paulo, Brazil | 3rd | 4 × 400 m relay | 3:12.61 |
| 1964 | Olympic Games | Tokyo, Japan | 4th | 4 × 400 m relay | 3:02.3 |
| 1966 | Central American and Caribbean Games | San Juan, Puerto Rico | 1st | 4 × 400 m relay | 3:08.8 |
| 1966 | British Empire and Commonwealth Games | Kingston, Jamaica | 17th (h) | 440 y | 48.3 |

^{1}Representing British West Indies
