= Richard Edmunds (athlete) =

American sprinter

Medal record

Men's athletics

Representing the United States

Pan American Games
| Gold medal – first place | 1963 São Paulo | 4x400 metres relay |

Richard Edmunds (born December 5, 1937) is an American former sprinter. He won the gold medal in the 4 × 400 metres relay at the 1963 Pan American Games.
