= Bob Soth =

American long-distance runner

Personal information
- Full name: Robert Charles Soth
- Born: April 6, 1933 (age 93) Tama, Iowa, United States

Sport
- Sport: Long-distance running
- Event: 5000 metres

Robert Charles Soth (born April 6, 1933) is an American long-distance runner. He competed in the men's 5000 metres at the 1960 Summer Olympics.
