= William Alley (javelin thrower) =

American javelin thrower

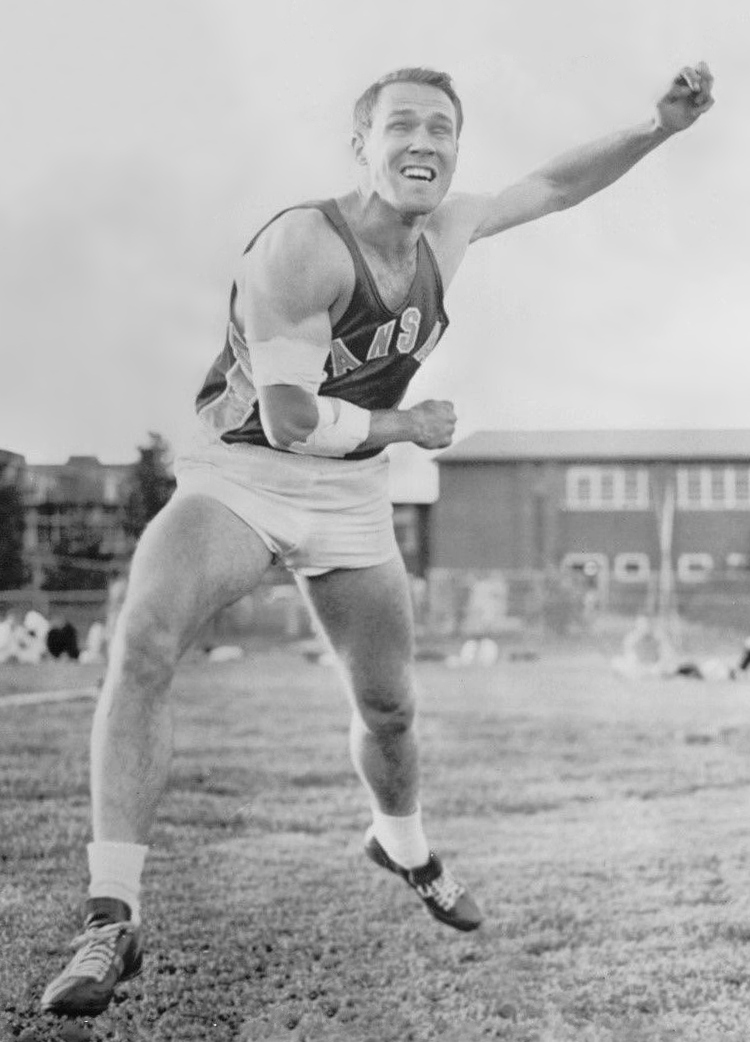
- Alley in 1959

Personal information
- Born: April 20, 1936 (age 90) Newark, New Jersey, U.S.
- Height: 190 cm (6 ft 3 in)
- Weight: 101 kg (223 lb)

Sport
- Sport: Athletics
- Event: Javelin throw
- Club: Kansas Jayhawks, Lawrence

Achievements and titles
- Personal best: 83.48 m (1962)

Francis William "Bill" Alley (born April 20, 1936) is a retired American javelin thrower. Competing for the Millburn High School, University of Kansas, and Syracuse University he won the NCAA title in 1959–60 and placed second at the AAU Championships in 1961–62. At the 1960 Olympics he finished 23rd.

In 1960, Alley broke the javelin world record with a throw of 283 ft 8 in (86.46 m).
