= Dave Tork =

American pole vaulter (born 1934)

Personal information
- Born: August 25, 1934 (age 91)
Medal record
Men's athletics
Representing the United States
Pan American Games
Gold medal – first place	1963 São Paulo	Pole vault

David Tork (born August 25, 1934) is retired male pole vaulter from the United States. He set his personal best (5.08 metres) in the event on June 27, 1964, at a meet in New Brunswick, New Jersey.

Tork finished second behind Pentti Nikula in the pole vault event at the British 1962 AAA Championships.

Records
Preceded by (United States) John Uelses	Men's Pole Vault World Record Holder; April 28, 1962 – June 22, 1962	Succeeded by (Finland) Pentti Nikula
