= Alex Breckenridge =

American long-distance runner

Alex Breckenridge (born 17 April 1932 in Buffalo) is a former American marathon runner.

Breckenridge competed for the Villanova Wildcats track and field team in the NCAA.

At the 1960 Summer Olympics in Rome, Italy, he finished 30th, and at the 1962 Boston Marathon he finished third.

He was a member of the Victoria Park Amateur Athletic Club in Glasgow.
