= Alex Oakley =

Canadian racewalker (1926–2010)

Personal information
- Born: April 28, 1926
- Died: October 24, 2010 (aged 84)
Medal record
Men's athletics
Representing Canada
Pan American Games
Gold medal – first place	1963 São Paulo	20km Walk

Alexander Harold Oakley (April 28, 1926 – October 24, 2010) was a race walker from Canada, who represented his native country at five Summer Olympics, starting in 1956. His best finish was the sixth place in the men's 50 km walk at the 1960 Summer Olympics in Rome, Italy. He won the 20 km event at the 1963 Pan American Games. He was born in St. John's, Newfoundland and Labrador. Aged 50 when he made his final Olympic appearance in 1976, he is the oldest person ever to compete in a track and field event at the Olympics.
