= Herman Stokes =

American triple jumper

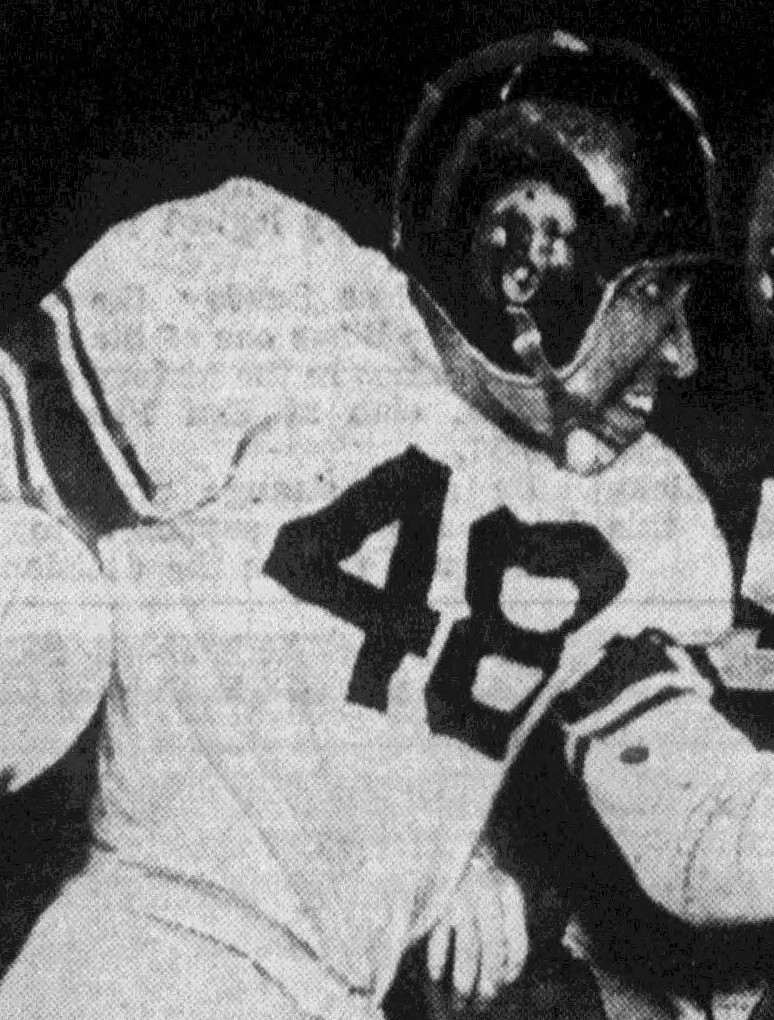
- Stokes, circa 1951

Personal information
- Born: October 16, 1932 Houston, Texas, U.S.
- Died: January 25, 1998 (aged 65) Los Angeles, California, U.S.

Sport
- Sport: Athletics
- Event: Triple jump

Herman Stokes (October 16, 1932 – January 25, 1998) was an American athlete. He competed in the men's triple jump at the 1960 Summer Olympics.
