= Ernie Cunliffe =

American middle-distance runner (1937–2026)

Personal information
- Born: William Ernest Cunliffe; September 2, 1937 Long Beach, California, U.S.
- Died: June 6, 2026 (aged 88)

Sport
- Sport: Middle-distance running
- Event: 800 metres

William Ernest Cunliffe (September 2, 1937 – June 6, 2026) was an American middle-distance runner. He competed in the men's 800 metres at the 1960 Summer Olympics.

Competing for the Stanford Cardinal track and field team, Cunliffe finished third in the 800 m at the 1959 NCAA Track and Field Championships and the 1960 NCAA Track and Field Championships.

Cunliffe died on June 6, 2026, at the age of 88.
