= Jim Grelle =

American middle-distance runner (1936–2020)

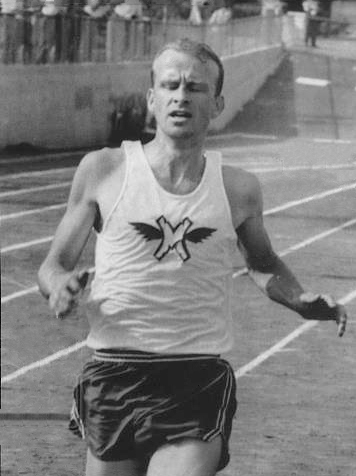
- Grelle in 1966

Personal information
- Born: September 30, 1936 Portland, Oregon, U.S.
- Died: June 13, 2020 (aged 83)
- Height: 183 cm (6 ft 0 in)
- Weight: 68 kg (150 lb)

Sport
- Sport: Athletics
- Event: 800–5000 m
- Club: Multnomah Athletic Club

Achievements and titles
- Personal best(s): 800 m – 1:48.4 (1958); 1500 m – 3:38.9 (1964); Mile – 3:55.4 (1965); 5000 m – 14:10.8 (1966)
Medal record
Representing United States
Pan American Games
Gold medal – first place	1963 Sao Paulo	1500 m
Silver medal – second place	1959 Chicago	1500 m

James Edward Grelle (September 30, 1936 – June 13, 2020) was an American middle-distance runner. He had his best achievements in the 1500 m event, finishing eighth at the 1960 Olympics, winning a gold and a silver medal at the Pan American Games in 1963 and 1959, respectively.

Grelle's first success was winning back to back Oregon state titles in the 880 yard run in 1954 and 1955 for Lincoln High School in Portland.

While running for the University of Oregon he won the NCAA Men's Outdoor Track and Field Championship in 1959 after being a runner up the previous two years. Leading up to the 1960 Olympics, he won the USA Outdoor Track and Field Championships. He also added two Indoor Championships in 1965 and 1966.

In 1962, at the Mt. SAC Relays Grelle became the 4th American sub-4 minute miler. He won the Mile there three years in a row. In 1965, he briefly held the American record in the mile at 3:55.4. Nine days later, Jim Ryun improved upon the record. Ryun also relegated Grelle to a non-qualifying fourth place in the 1964 Olympic Trials. Previously in 1963, he held the American record in the 2 mile run at 8:25.2.

Grelle was inducted into the Oregon Sports Hall of Fame in 1981, to the Mt. SAC Relays Hall of Fame in 1991, and to the Oregon Ducks Hall of Fame in 1994.

Grelle died on June 13, 2020, at the age of 83.
