= Bill Sharpe (athlete) =

American triple jumper

Personal information
- Born: William John Sharpe; January 23, 1932 Philadelphia, Pennsylvania, U.S.
- Died: December 28, 1995 (aged 63)
Medal record
Men's Athletics
Representing the United States
Pan American Games
Gold medal – first place	1963 São Paulo	Triple jump
Bronze medal – third place	1959 Chicago	Triple jump

William John Sharpe (January 23, 1932 – December 28, 1995) was an athlete from the United States, competing in the triple jump. A three-time Olympian he won the gold medal in the men's triple jump event at the 1963 Pan American Games in Brazil.

Representing the West Chester Golden Rams track and field team, Sharpe won the 1956 NCAA Track and Field Championships in the triple jump.
