= Ronald Zinn =

American racewalker (1939–1965)

- Ronald Zinn

Personal information
- Full name: Ronald Lloyd Zinn
- Nickname: Ron
- Nationality: American
- Born: May 10, 1939 Peoria, Illinois, U.S.
- Died: July 7, 1965 (aged 26) War Zone D, South Vietnam
- Education: United States Military Academy
- Occupation: United States Army Captain
- Height: 5 ft 11 in (1.80 m)
- Weight: 150 lb (68 kg)
Medal record
Men's Athletics
Representing the United States
Pan American Games
Bronze medal – third place	1963 Sao Paulo	20km Walk

Ronald Lloyd Zinn (May 10, 1939 – July 7, 1965) was a race walker from the United States, who represented his native country at two Summer Olympics, starting in 1960. His best finish was sixth place in the men's 20 km walk at the 1964 Summer Olympics in Tokyo, Japan. He came in third in the 20 km event at the 1963 Pan American Games.

Ron Zinn was born in Peoria, Illinois. He graduated from the United States Military Academy at West Point in 1962 and served in the United States Army during the Vietnam War. Zinn was killed in a firefight in War Zone D while serving as platoon leader B Company, 2nd Battalion, 503rd Infantry Regiment, 173rd Airborne Brigade. He held the rank of Lieutenant at the time of his death.

Camp Zinn, an Army base east of Bien Hoa Air Base, was named in his honor. Additionally, USA Track and Field annually recognizes the top male and female race walker in the country with an award bearing his name.

== Sources ==
- Ronald Zinn, CPT, Army, Orland Park IL, 07Jul65 02E030 - The Virtual Wall
- Ron Zinn at Olympics at Sports-Reference.com (archived)
- Wallechinsky, David; Loucky, Jaime (2012). The Complete Book of the Olympics 2012 Edition. London: Aurum Press. p. 198. ISBN 978-1-84513-695-6.
