= Russ Rogers =

American hurdler

Personal information
- Nationality: American
- Born: Russell Rogers; January 9, 1939 (age 87)

Sport
- Sport: Athletics
- Event: Hurdling
Medal record
Representing United States
Pan American Games
Silver medal – second place	1967 Winnipeg	400 m hurdles
Bronze medal – third place	1963 São Paulo	400 m hurdles

Russell Rogers (born January 9, 1939) is an American former athletics competitor and coach.

== Biography ==
Rogers competed in football, basketball, and track for Malcolm X Shabazz High School. He competed collegiately for the Maryland Eastern Shore Hawks track and field team in the NCAA. He was inducted into the school's hall of fame in 1982.

Rogers, a specialist hurdler, won a bronze medal in the 400 meters hurdles at the 1963 Pan American Games in São Paulo, which he bettered with a silver in the same event at the 1967 Pan American Games in Winnipeg.

Rogers won the British AAA Championships title in the 440 yards hurdles event at the 1962 AAA Championships.

Beginning in 1969, Rogers coached the Essex Wolverines track and field team in New Jersey. From 1978 to 1986, Rogers was the track and field coach of Fairleigh Dickinson University.

In 1988 he was sprint coach for the US Olympic track and field team in Seoul, which famously included Carl Lewis.

Between 1989 and 2006, Rogers coached athletics at Ohio State University. He earned Big Ten Conference Coach of the Year honors in 1992 and 1993 when he led Ohio State to consecutive Big Ten outdoor titles.
