= Gordon McKenzie (athlete) =

American long-distance runner

Gordon Edmund McKenzie (June 26, 1927 – July 19, 2013) was an American athlete who competed in the 10,000 meters at the 1956 Summer Olympics in Melbourne, Australia and the marathon at the 1960 Summer Olympics in Rome, Italy. McKenzie, running 2:28:18, finished second to Paavo Kotila in the 1960 Boston Marathon, an Olympic trials race. He finished fourth in the 1961 Boston Marathon, at 2:28:40.

McKenzie was also an AAU cross country champion (1954) who finished fourth in the 5000 meters at the 1955 Pan American Games and was a silver medalist in the marathon at the 1963 Pan American Games, where he ran 2:31:18. He finished 2nd and won U.S. track championship medals at 5000 meters in 1953, '54 and '55, and 3rd in 1956. At 10,000 meters, he finished 2nd in 1955 and 1958, 3rd in 1956. He ran for New York University (NYU) and the New York Pioneer Club.

Besides his 1960 Boston time (on an uncertified course), he had personal track bests of 4:12.9 in the indoor mile, set in 1954, 8:58.8 at 2 miles indoors and 14:02.9 at 3 miles in 1955, and 30:34.4 at 10,000 meters, set in 1956.

McKenzie was married to the former Christina Slemon, a British middle-distance runner who in 1958 became the first US AAU Champion in the 440 yards, and who, in 1953, had been part of a British world-record setting team in the 3×880 yard relay. Gordon McKenzie's career was as a civil engineer with the city of New York, after studying engineering at NYU.

== Personal ==
McKenzie was from Great Neck, New York. His wife was Christina Slemon McKenzie, known as Chris, a member of the former British World Record-holding team in the three-times-880 yard relay, and a pioneer who was instrumental in helping women to officially compete at races longer than 220 yards in the U.S. They had three children: Tina, Adam, and Stuart.
