= Albert Hall (athlete) =

American hammer thrower (1934–2008)

Personal information
- Nickname: Al
- Nationality: American
- Citizenship: American
- Born: Albert William Hall; August 2, 1934
- Died: October 9, 2008 (aged 74) Tonopah, Nevada, U.S.
- Education: Cornell University

Sport
- Country: America
- Sport: hammer throwing

Achievements and titles
- Olympic finals: Summer Olympics 1956, 1960, 1964 and 1968

Albert William Hall (August 2, 1934 – October 9, 2008) was an American hammer throw champion, who competed in the Olympics on four occasions.

== Early life ==
Hall grew up on the family's farm in Hanson, Massachusetts, where he built up his physique using a set of weights he had constructed from concrete cylinders.

Hall attended Whitman High School (now part of Whitman-Hanson Regional High School), where he was a running back on the school's football team and became an active participant on the track team during his senior year. Hall graduated from the school in 1952.

He appeared on the August 14, 1960 broadcast of What's My Line where the guests were associated with the Olympics, including Jesse Owens as the "mystery guest".

== Track and field competition ==
He attended Cornell University, where he was the intercollegiate heptagonal track and field champion on three occasions. He set multiple meet records at major events and was captain of the 1955–56 Cornell team, winning recognition as Athlete of the Year that season by The Cornell Daily Sun. He was also a member of the Quill and Dagger society.

Hall finished in first place at the US Olympic Trials in 1956, and came in fourth place, just short of a medal, at the 1956 Summer Olympics in Melbourne. He finished first again at the 1960 US Olympic Trials and competed at the 1960 games in Rome, finishing in 14th place. He was the Amateur Athletic Union's national hammer champion in 1962 and 1963, and was part of the first American track and field teams to compete in the Soviet Union in the late 1950s and China in 1974. He was part of the United States team at the 1964 Olympics in Tokyo, finishing in 12th place. He made the U.S. team for the fourth time in 1968 and finished 14th at the 1968 Summer Olympics in Mexico City. Hall fell inches short of making the U.S. team for the 1972 Olympics, despite a personal best throw of 222 feet, 8 inches at the Olympic trials and tried out as well for the 1976 U.S. Olympic team. He competed in the indoor weight throw in both the 35-pound and 56-pound events and was national champion four times.

At the Pan American Games, Hall won three gold medals, winning one in each of three consecutive decades. He won his first gold at the 1959 Pan American Games in Chicago, and repeated as champion at the 1963 Pan American Games in São Paulo, Brazil. He did not participate in 1967, but came back to win his third gold at the 1971 Pan American Games in Cali, Colombia, with a throw of 216 feet that set a Pan American Games record.

He appeared on "What's My Line" just before going to the Rome Olympics, 14 August 1960.

== Personal life ==
In 2004, the Whitman VFW Post 697 established the Albert W. Hall Award, a cherry wood trophy with an Olympian on top, which is presented each year to a male and female student-athlete at Whitman-Hanson Regional High School who exemplifies the qualities of teamwork, dedication, and perseverance. His great nephew, Jacob Ellis Hart, was awarded this honor in 2006.

He met his wife, the former Lorraine Lorey, in Fort Lee, Virginia, when Hall was a lieutenant in the United States Army and she was a sergeant in the Women's Army Corps. The couple spent many years living in Charlton, Massachusetts, and moved to Tonopah, Nevada, in 2002. Their son, Shawn, was born in 1960 and currently resides in Tonopah.

Hall died at age 74 on October 9, 2008, in Tonopah of complications from Alzheimer's disease.
