= Dave Davis (shot putter) =

American shot putter (born 1937)

Dave Davis (August 20, 1937 – April 5, 2022) is an American Shot Putter. He was on the 1960 United States Olympic Team. The circumstances of his failure to throw in those games are one of the quirky stories of the Olympics. Davis almost did not get to the Olympic Trials. As Cordner Nelson wrote at the time, he found himself 45 miles north of the Stanford University stadium at the time his event was about to begin. This was not the first time he had gotten lost on the way to a big meet. Davis spent $18 to rent a seaplane to fly him to the Palo Alto harbor, where he convinced a city employee to drive him to the stadium while he changed his clothes. Arriving after the first two rounds had been completed, he took his qualifying throw with no warm up and made it to the final. In the final, he surpassed Bill Nieder's earlier throw to move into third place. Injured with his leg heavily taped, Nieder was unable to improve and was pushed to the "alternate" position, while the team was made up of three University of Southern California alumni (though Davis and Parry O'Brien were officially competing for the Southern California Striders).

At the Olympics, it was Davis who was injured. Olympic Team coach Payton Jordan replaced Davis with the alternate Nieder. The Associated Press sent out a picture of Davis congratulating Nieder on his advancement to the Olympics when it was clear his injury would prevent his participation. Nieder went on to win the gold medal and set the world record, leading an American sweep of the medals.

Davis was a big, strong man, known for warming up by "calmly" lifting 350 pound weights, techniques he later taught to Brian Oldfield.

While competing for Canoga Park High School in 1956, Davis set the National High School Record for the shot put at 62' 7½" which lasted just 5 days. Two weeks later at the CIF California State Meet he easily won the 16 Lb. Shot Put event, at the time a separate event from the standard high school 12 Lb., but lost to high school version to a new national record by Homer Robertson. He also finished third in the discus throw.

At USC, he won the 1958 NCAA Championship. In 1963 he won the United States championship. Davis' rivalry with Polish shot-putter Alfred Sosgórnik, during the final of the competition in Warsaw in 1964, is depicted in a short documentary by Janusz Majewski titled Pojedynek (pl. the duel). He continued throwing until 1972 setting his personal best of 19.72 in 1967. Davis died April 4, 2022 in Idaho.
