= Pete McArdle =

Irish born athlete and greyhound racing trainer

Personal information
- Born: 22 March 1929
- Died: 24 June 1985 (aged 56)
Medal record
Men's athletics
Representing the United States
Pan American Games
Gold medal – first place	1963 São Paulo	10,000 metres
Bronze medal – third place	1963 São Paulo	Marathon

Peter Joseph McArdle (22 March 1929 – 24 June 1985) was an Irish born long-distance runner who became a U.S. citizen, taking a gold medal for the United States at the 1963 Pan American Games in São Paulo, Brazil.

== Ireland ==
As a resident of Blackrock, County Louth he trained at the greyhound track on Sandy Lane and in athletics he won twelve National titles between 1951 and 1956 before emigrating to the United States in 1956.

== United States ==
McArdle was selected for the United States team for the 1964 Summer Olympics in Tokyo. He completed in the Athletics at the 1964 Summer Olympics – Men's marathon in a time of 2:25, finishing in 23rd place.

A resident of Teaneck, New Jersey, since 1969, McArdle died during a training run at Van Cortlandt Park in New York City.
