= Earl Young (athlete) =

American sprinter (born 1941)

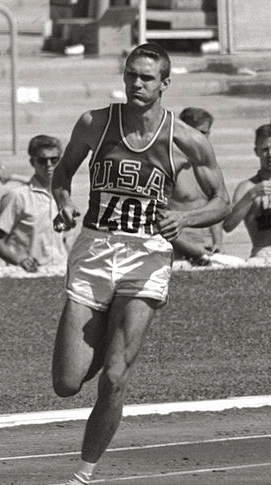
- Young at the 1960 Olympics

Personal information
- Full name: Earl Verdelle Young
- Born: February 14, 1941 (age 85) San Fernando, California, U.S.
- Height: 6 ft 3 in (1.90 m)
- Weight: 174 lb (79 kg)

Sport
- Sport: Athletics
- Events: 100 m, 400 m
- Club: ACU Wildcats, Abilene

Achievements and titles
- Personal bests: 100 m – 10.5 (1960); 220 yd – 20.9 (1960); 400 m – 45.7 (1960)
Medal record
Representing the United States
Olympic Games
Gold medal – first place	1960 Rome	4 × 400 m relay
Pan American Games
Gold medal – first place	1963 São Paulo	4 × 100 m relay
Gold medal – first place	1963 São Paulo	4 × 400 m relay

Earl Verdelle Young (born February 14, 1941) is a retired American sprinter. He competed at the 1960 Olympics and won a gold medal in the 4 × 400 m relay setting a new world record at 3.02.2. He finished sixth in 400 m, in a time of 45.9 s that matched the former Olympic Record. At the 1963 Pan American Games, Young won gold medals in both 4 × 100 m and 4 × 400 m relays.

He was Inducted into the Texas Track and Field Coaches Hall of Fame, Class of 2015.
