= Fulgencia Romay =

Cuban sprinter

Personal information
- Born: January 16, 1944 (age 82) Diez de Octubre, Havana, Cuba

Sport
- Sport: Track and field
Medal record
Representing Cuba
Olympic Games
Silver medal – second place	1968 Mexico City	4x100 metre relay
Bronze medal – third place	1972 Munich	4x100 metre relay
Pan American Games
Silver medal – second place	1963 São Paulo	4x100 m relay
Silver medal – second place	1971 Cali	200 metres
Silver medal – second place	1971 Cali	4x100 m relay
Silver medal – second place	1975 Mexico City	4x100 m relay
Central American and Caribbean Games
Gold medal – first place	1970 Panama City	4x100 m relay
Silver medal – second place	1962 Kingston	4x100 m relay
Silver medal – second place	1966 San Juan	4x100 m relay
Silver medal – second place	1970 Panama City	100 metres
Bronze medal – third place	1970 Panama City	200 metres
Summer Universiade
Bronze medal – third place	1963 Porto Alegre	4x100m relay

Fulgencia Romay Martínez (born January 16, 1944) is a Cuban former sprinter who was made history at the 1968 Summer Olympics in Mexico City by winning a silver medal in the 4 × 100-meter relay alongside Marlene Elejarde, Violeta Quesada, and Miguelina Cobián. Romay established herself as a elite regional competitor, securing consecutive 4 × 100-meter relay silver medals at the 1962 and 1966 Central American and Caribbean Games, as well as a silver medal at the 1963 Pan American Games and a bronze medal at the 1963 Summer Universiade.

== Early life ==
She was born on 16 January 1944 in Luyanó, Ciudad de La Habana.

In 1962, she won the silver medal in the 4 × 100 meters relay at the 1962 Central American and Caribbean Games with her teammates, Berta Díaz, Nereida Borges and Miguelina Cobián 47.3 seconds, losing to Jamaica and Panama in the third place.

On 1963 Pan American Games, she won a silver medal in 4 × 100 meters relay at 46.4 seconds with Irene Martínez replacing Diaz and losing to the team from the United States of America in 45.56 seconds, consisting of Willye White, Marilyn White, Norma Harris, and Vivian Brown , followed by Brasil in 48.1 seconds, consisting of Leontina Santos, Erica Lopes da Silva, Edir Braga Ribeiro, and Inês Pimenta.In the same year, he won a bronze medal in the 1963 Summer Universiade for the same sport.

On her second participation in 1966 Central American and Caribbean Games, she won the silver medal again at 46.5 in the same sport with Martinez, Cobian and Isabel Echevarría replacing Borges losing to the team from the Jamaica in 46.2 seconds, consisting of Adlin Mair, Una Morris, Vilma Charlton and Carmen Smith , followed by Barbados in 48.1 seconds, consisting of Aledene Holder, Freida Nicholls, Arlene Babb and Patsy Callender.

Her first Olympics were in the 1968 Summer Olympics, where she won the silver medal at 43.3 seconds in the 4 × 100 meters relay with Marlene Elejarde, Violeta Quesada, and Miguelina Cobián, losing to the team from the United States of America in 42.8 seconds, consisting of Barbara Ferrell, Margaret Bailes, Mildred Netter, and Wyomia Tyus. In the third place, followed by the Soviet Union in 43.3 seconds, consisting of Lyudmila Zharkova • Galina Bukharina, Vera Popkova, and Lyudmila Samotesova.

== International competitions ==
Year	Competition	Venue	Position	Event	Notes
Representing Cuba
1962	Central American and Caribbean Games	Kingston, Jamaica	11th (sf)	100 m	12.7
1962	Central American and Caribbean Games	Kingston, Jamaica	2nd	4 × 100 m relay	47.3
1963	Pan American Games	São Paulo, Brazil	5th	100 m	12.01
1963	Pan American Games	São Paulo, Brazil	5th	200 m	25.4
1963	Pan American Games	São Paulo, Brazil	2nd	4 × 100 m relay	46.44
1963	Universiade	Porto Alegre, Brazil	6th	100 m	12.6
1963	Universiade	Porto Alegre, Brazil	3rd	4 × 100 m relay	47.5
1966	Central American and Caribbean Games	San Juan, Puerto Rico	4th	100 m	12.0
1966	Central American and Caribbean Games	San Juan, Puerto Rico	4th	200 m	25.2
1966	Central American and Caribbean Games	San Juan, Puerto Rico	2nd	4 × 100 m relay	46.5
1968	Olympic Games	Mexico City, Mexico	7th (h)	100 m	11.5
1968	Olympic Games	Mexico City, Mexico	17th (h)	200 m	23.7^{1}
1968	Olympic Games	Mexico City, Mexico	2nd	4 × 100 m relay	43.36
1969	Central American and Caribbean Championships	Havana, Cuba	2nd	100 m	11.8
1969	Central American and Caribbean Championships	Havana, Cuba	1st	4 × 100 m relay	45.9
1970	Central American and Caribbean Games	Panama City, Panama	2nd	100 m	11.6 (w)
1970	Central American and Caribbean Games	Panama City, Panama	3rd	200 m	24.3
1970	Central American and Caribbean Games	Panama City, Panama	1st	4 × 100 m relay	44.7
1971	Central American and Caribbean Championships	Kingston, Jamaica	1st	100 m	11.6
1971	Central American and Caribbean Championships	Kingston, Jamaica	2nd	200 m	23.70
1971	Central American and Caribbean Championships	Kingston, Jamaica	2nd	4 × 100 m relay	45.01
1971	Pan American Games	Cali, Colombia	4th (h)	100 m	11.52^{1}
1971	Pan American Games	Cali, Colombia	3rd	200 m	23.89
1971	Pan American Games	Cali, Colombia	1st	4 × 100 m relay	44.63
1972	Olympic Games	Munich, West Germany	3rd	4 × 100 m relay	43.36
1973	Central American and Caribbean Championships	Maracaibo, Venezuela	1st	4 × 100 m relay	45.9
1975	Pan American Games	Mexico City, Mexico	2nd	4 × 100 m relay	43.65
1976	Olympic Games	Montreal, Canada	10th (h)	4 × 100 m relay	44.29

^{1}Did not start in the semifinals

== Personal bests ==
- 100 metres (hand timing) – 11.2h (1976)
- 100 metres (electronic timing) – 11.47 A (+1.8 m/s Mexico City 1968)
- 200 metres (hand timing) – 23.4h (1972)
- 200 metres (electronic timing) – 23.71 A (0.0 m/s, Mexico City 1968)
