= Athletics at the 1968 Summer Olympics – Women's 200 metres =

Women's 200 metres at the Games of the XIX Olympiad
- Venue: Estadio Olímpico Universitario
- Date: October 17–18, 1968
- Competitors: 36 from 21 nations
- Winning time: 22.5 WR

Medalists
1st place, gold medalist(s)		Irena Szewińska	Poland
2nd place, silver medalist(s)		Raelene Boyle	Australia
3rd place, bronze medalist(s)		Jenny Lamy	Australia

The Women's 200 metres competition at the 1968 Summer Olympics in Mexico City, Mexico was held at the University Olympic Stadium on October 17–18. The winning margin was 0.2 seconds.

== Competition format ==
The Women's 200m competition consisted of heats (Round 1), semifinals and a Final. The three fastest competitors from each race in the heats qualified for the semifinals along with the fastest overall competitor not already qualified. The four fastest competitors from each of the semifinal races qualified for the final.

== Records ==
Prior to the competition, the existing World and Olympic records were as follows.

World record	Irena Szewińska (POL)	22.7	Warsaw, Poland	August 8, 1965
Olympic record	Edith McGuire (USA)	23.0	Tokyo, Japan	October 19, 1964

== Results ==
=== Round 1 ===
Qual. rule: first 3 of each heat (Q) plus the fastest Time (hand) !! Time (automatic) (q) qualified.

==== Heat 1 ====
Wind: 0.0 m/s

Rank	Athlete	Nation	Time (hand)	Time (automatic)	Notes
1	Lyudmila Samotyosova	Soviet Union	23.1	23.16	Q
2	Margaret Bailes	United States	23.1	23.17	Q
3	Nicole Montandon	France	23.3	23.34	Q
4	Marijana Lubej	Yugoslavia	23.9	23.96	
5	Eva Glesková	Czechoslovakia	24.0	24.08	
6	Györgyi Balogh	Hungary	24.1	24.15	
7	Tien Ah-mei	Taiwan	25.5	25.53	
	Jean Robotham	Costa Rica	DNS	–	

==== Heat 2 ====
Wind: 0.0 m/s

Rank	Athlete	Nation	Time (hand)	Time (automatic)	Notes
1	Raelene Boyle	Australia	23.0	23.09	Q
2	Vera Popkova	Soviet Union	23.3	23.40	Q
3	Truus Hennipman	Netherlands	23.4	23.43	Q
4	Lillian Board	Great Britain	23.4	23.49	q
5	Irene Piotrowski	Canada	23.7	23.74	
6	Vilma Charlton	Jamaica	24.3	24.39	
7	Josefa Vicent	Uruguay	24.8	24.89	
8	Yeh Chu-Mei	Taiwan	25.5	25.55	

==== Heat 3 ====
Wind: 0.0 m/s

Rank	Athlete	Nation	Time (hand)	Time (automatic)	Notes
1	Barbara Ferrell	United States	22.9	22.94	Q
2	Jenny Lamy	Australia	23.1	23.19	Q
3	Jutta Stöck	West Germany	23.3	23.37	Q
4	Wilma van Gool-van den Berg	Netherlands	23.5	23.54	
5	Maureen Tranter	Great Britain	23.5	23.58	
6	Lyudmila Golomazova	Soviet Union	23.7	23.73	
7	Alice Anum	Ghana	23.9	23.95	
8	Karin Wallgren	Sweden	24.2	24.23	

==== Heat 4 ====
Wind: 0.0 m/s

Rank	Athlete	Nation	Time (hand)	Time (automatic)	Notes
1	Wyomia Tyus	United States	23.4	23.46	Q
2	Dianne Bowering-Burge	Australia	23.6	23.69	Q
3	Fulgencia Romay	Cuba	23.7	23.71	Q
4	Oyeronke Akindele	Nigeria	23.9	23.91	
5	Alicia Kaufmanas	Argentina	24.4	24.57	
6	Halina Górecka	West Germany	24.7	24.62	
	Lydia Stephens	Kenya	DNS	–	

==== Heat 5 ====
Wind: 0.0 m/s

Rank	Athlete	Nation	Time (hand)	Time (automatic)	Notes
1	Irena Szewinska	Poland	23.2	23.21	Q
2	Miguelina Cobián	Cuba	23.4	23.50	Q
3	Una Morris	Jamaica	23.7	23.80	Q
4	Sylviane Telliez	France	23.8	23.84	
5	Mieke Sterk	Netherlands	24.0	24.01	
6	Rita Wilden	West Germany	24.0	24.02	
7	Esperanza Girón	Mexico	25.3	25.32	
	Berit Berthelsen	Norway	DNS	–	

=== Semi-final ===
==== Heat 1 ====
Wind: 0.0 m/s

Rank	Athlete	Nation	Time (hand)	Time (automatic)	Notes
1	Raelene Boyle	Australia	22.9		Q
2	Wyomia Tyus	United States	23.1		Q
3	Irena Szewinska	Poland	23.2		Q
4	Jutta Stöck	West Germany	23.4		Q
5	Lyudmila Samotyosova	Soviet Union	23.4		
6	Lillian Board	Great Britain	23.4		
7	Dianne Bowering-Burge	Australia	23.6		
	Fulgencia Romay	Cuba	DNS		

==== Heat 2 ====
Wind: +1.7 m/s

Rank	Athlete	Nation	Time (hand)	Time (automatic)	Notes
1	Barbara Ferrell	United States	22.8	22.87	Q OR
2	Jenny Lamy	Australia	22.8	22.89	Q
3	Margaret Bailes	United States	22.9	22.95	Q
4	Nicole Montandon	France	23.0	23.02	Q
5	Vera Popkova	Soviet Union	23.2	23.28	
6	Miguelina Cobián	Cuba	23.3	23.39	
7	Una Morris	Jamaica	23.5	23.59	
8	Truus Hennipman	Netherlands	23.5	23.60	

=== Final ===
Wind: +2.0 m/s

Rank	Athlete	Nation	Time (hand)	Time (automatic)	Notes
1st place, gold medalist(s)	Irena Szewinska	Poland	22.5	22.58	WR
2nd place, silver medalist(s)	Raelene Boyle	Australia	22.7	22.74	WJR
3rd place, bronze medalist(s)	Jenny Lamy	Australia	22.8	22.88	
4	Barbara Ferrell	United States	22.9	22.93	
5	Nicole Montandon	France	23.0	23.08	
6	Wyomia Tyus	United States	23.0	23.08	
7	Margaret Bailes	United States	23.1	23.18	
8	Jutta Stöck	West Germany	23.2	23.25	
