= Athletics at the 1967 Pan American Games – Women's 200 metres =

Women's 200 metres at the Pan American Games

The women's 200 metres event at the 1967 Pan American Games was held in Winnipeg on 1 and 2 August.

== Medalists ==
| Gold | Silver | Bronze |
|---|---|---|
| Wyomia Tyus; United States | Barbara Ferrell; United States | Miguelina Cobián; Cuba |

== Results ==
=== Heats ===
Wind:
Heat 1: +3.3 m/s, Heat 2: +1.0 m/s

| Rank | Heat | Name | Nationality | Time | Notes |
|---|---|---|---|---|---|
| 1 | 1 | Wyomia Tyus | United States | 23.60 | Q |
| 2 | 1 | Miguelina Cobián | Cuba | 23.66 | Q |
| 3 | 1 | Vilma Charlton | Jamaica | 23.82 | Q |
| 3 | 2 | Barbara Ferrell | United States | 23.82 | Q |
| 5 | 2 | Una Morris | Jamaica | 23.85 | Q |
| 6 | 2 | Irene Piotrowski | Canada | 23.90 | Q |
| 7 | 2 | Violeta Quesada | Cuba | 24.14 | Q |
| 8 | 1 | Janet Maddin | Canada | 24.36 | Q |
| 9 | 2 | Esperanza Girón | Mexico | 25.18 | |
| 10 | 2 | Irenice Rodrigues | Brazil | 25.19 | |
| 11 | 1 | Gladys Azcuaga | Mexico | 26.09 | |
| 12 | 2 | María Azurduy | Bolivia | 26.8 | |
| 13 | 1 | Rosa Catalina Armas | Guatemala | 27.25 | |

=== Final ===
Wind: +4.1 m/s

| Rank | Name | Nationality | Time | Notes |
|---|---|---|---|---|
| 1st place, gold medalist(s) | Wyomia Tyus | United States | 23.78 | |
| 2nd place, silver medalist(s) | Barbara Ferrell | United States | 23.83 | |
| 3rd place, bronze medalist(s) | Miguelina Cobián | Cuba | 23.89 | |
| 4 | Irene Piotrowski | Canada | 23.91 | |
| 5 | Vilma Charlton | Jamaica | 24.03 | |
| 6 | Una Morris | Jamaica | 24.07 | |
| 7 | Violeta Quesada | Cuba | 24.42 | |
| 8 | Janet Maddin | Canada | 24.87 | |
