= Athletics at the 1963 Summer Universiade – Women's 200 metres =

The women's 200 metres event at the 1963 Summer Universiade was held at the Estádio Olímpico Monumental in Porto Alegre in September 1963.

== Medalists ==
Gold	Silver	Bronze
Jutta Heine; West Germany	Renāte Lāce; Soviet Union	Miguelina Cobián; Cuba

== Results ==
=== Heats ===
Rank	Heat	Name	Nationality	Time	Notes
1	1	Jutta Heine	West Germany	24.5	Q
2	1	Vlasta Přikrylová	Czechoslovakia	24.6	Q
3	1	Joan Atkinson	Great Britain	25.0	
4	1	Maria Regina Fabre	Brazil	28.3	
1	2	Renāte Lāce	Soviet Union	24.73	Q
2	2	Claudette Actis	France	24.87	Q
3	2	Antje Gleichfeld	West Germany	25.08	
4	2	Terezinha Matos Monte	Brazil	28.3	
1	3	Vera Popkova	Soviet Union	24.5	Q
2	3	Miguelina Cobián	Cuba	24.7	Q
3	3	Avril Usher-Bowring	Great Britain	25.0	
4	3	Miryam Sidranski	Israel	25.2	

=== Final ===
Rank	Athlete	Nationality	Time	Notes
1st place, gold medalist(s)	Jutta Heine	West Germany	24.60	
2nd place, silver medalist(s)	Renāte Lāce	Soviet Union	24.64	
3rd place, bronze medalist(s)	Miguelina Cobián	Cuba	24.74	
4	Vera Popkova	Soviet Union	24.74	
5	Vlasta Přikrylová	Czechoslovakia	25.0	
6	Claudette Actis	France	25.2	
