= Athletics at the 1963 Summer Universiade – Women's 100 metres =

The women's 100 metres event at the 1963 Summer Universiade was held at the Estádio Olímpico Monumental in Porto Alegre in September 1963.

== Medalists ==
Gold	Silver	Bronze
Renāte Lāce; Soviet Union	Vera Popkova; Soviet Union	Miguelina Cobián; Cuba

== Results ==
=== Heats ===
Rank	Heat	Name	Nationality	Time	Notes
1	1	Renāte Lāce	Soviet Union	11.91	Q
2	1	Miguelina Cobián	Cuba	12.02	Q
3	1	Joan Atkinson	Great Britain	12.11	Q
4	1	Miryam Sidranski	Israel	12.40	
5	1	Elke Mansfeld	West Germany	12.4	
6	1	Maria Regina Fabre	Brazil	13.4	
1	2	Vera Popkova	Soviet Union	12.1	Q
2	2	Fulgencia Romay	Cuba	12.6 (?)	Q
3	2	Claudette Actis	France	12.2	Q
4	2	Avril Usher-Bowring	Great Britain	12.3	
5	2	Terezinha Matos Monte	Brazil	13.4	

=== Final ===
Rank	Athlete	Nationality	Time	Notes
1st place, gold medalist(s)	Renāte Lāce	Soviet Union	12.0	
2nd place, silver medalist(s)	Vera Popkova	Soviet Union	12.3	
3rd place, bronze medalist(s)	Miguelina Cobián	Cuba	12.4	
4	Joan Atkinson	Great Britain	12.4	
5	Claudette Actis	France	12.5	
6	Fulgencia Romay	Cuba	12.6	
