= Athletics at the 1963 Pan American Games – Women's 200 metres =

Women's 200 metres at the Pan American Games

The women's 200 metres event at the 1963 Pan American Games was held at the Pacaembu Stadium in São Paulo on 30 April and 1 May.

== Medalists ==
| Gold | Silver | Bronze |
|---|---|---|
| Vivian Brown; United States | Miguelina Cobián; Cuba | Lorraine Dunn; Panama |

== Results ==
=== Heats ===
| Rank | Heat | Name | Nationality | Time | Notes |
|---|---|---|---|---|---|
| 1 | 1 | Norma Harris | United States | 24.4 | Q |
| 2 | 1 | Josefina Sobers | Panama | 25.2 | Q |
| 3 | 1 | Heather Campbell | Canada | 25.4 | |
| | 1 | Sybil Donmartin | Trinidad and Tobago | DNS | |
| 1 | 2 | Vivian Brown | United States | 23.84 | Q |
| 2 | 2 | Fulgencia Romay | Cuba | 25.01 | Q |
| 3 | 2 | Erica da Silva | Brazil | 25.27 | |
| 4 | 2 | Thora Best | Trinidad and Tobago | 25.88 | |
| 5 | 2 | Gisela Vidal | Venezuela | 25.97 | |
| 1 | 3 | Miguelina Cobián | Cuba | 24.39 | Q |
| 2 | 3 | Lorraine Dunn | Panama | 25.04 | Q |
| 3 | 3 | Yvonne Breeden | Canada | 25.29 | |
| 4 | 3 | Leontina dos Santos | Brazil | 26.30 | |
| | 3 | Marcela Daniel | Panama | DNS | |

=== Final ===
| Rank | Name | Nationality | Time | Notes |
|---|---|---|---|---|
| 1st place, gold medalist(s) | Vivian Brown | United States | 23.9 | |
| 2nd place, silver medalist(s) | Miguelina Cobián | Cuba | 24.0 | |
| 3rd place, bronze medalist(s) | Lorraine Dunn | Panama | 24.7 | |
| 4 | Norma Harris | United States | 25.3 | |
| 5 | Fulgencia Romay | Cuba | 25.4 | |
| 6 | Josefina Sobers | Panama | 26.0 | |
