= Athletics at the 1963 Pan American Games – Women's 4 × 100 metres relay =

Women's 4 × 100 metres relay at the Pan American Games

The women's 4 × 100 metres relay event at the 1963 Pan American Games was held at the Pacaembu Stadium in São Paulo on 4 May.

== Results ==
Rank	Nation	Athletes	Time	Notes
1st place, gold medalist(s)	United States	Marilyn White, Vivian Brown, Willye White, Norma Harris	45.72	
2nd place, silver medalist(s)	Cuba	Fulgencia Romay, Miguelina Cobián, Irene Martínez, Nereida Borges	46.44	NR
3rd place, bronze medalist(s)	Brazil	Leontina Santos, Érica da Silva, Edir Ribeiro, Inês Pimenta	48.18	
4	Panama	Josefina Sobers, Lorraine Dunn, Marcela Daniel, Jean Holmes	48.31	
	Canada	Joanne Rootsaert, Heather Campbell, Yvonne Breeden, Maureen Bardoe	DQ	
	Trinidad and Tobago	Thora Best, Patricia Watts, Sigrid Sandiford, Sybil Donmartin	DQ	
