= 1967 Central American and Caribbean Championships in Athletics =

- Dates: 17–19 August
- Host city: Xalapa, Mexico
- Venue: Estadio Heriberto Jara Corona

The inaugural 1967 Central American and Caribbean Championships in Athletics were held at the Estadio Heriberto Jara Corona in Xalapa, Veracruz, Mexico between 5–7 May.

== Medal summary ==
=== Men's events ===
Event	Gold		Silver		Bronze	
100 metres	Hermes Ramírez; Cuba	10.5A	Juan Franceschi; Puerto Rico	10.6A	Félix Eugellés; Cuba	10.8A
200 metres	Hermes Ramírez; Cuba	21.6A	Juan Franceschi; Puerto Rico	21.6A	Miguel González; Mexico	21.7A
400 metres	Juan Franceschi; Puerto Rico	47.1A	Rodobaldo Díaz; Cuba	47.6A	Manuel Montalvo; Cuba	48.1A
800 metres	Frederico Vera; Mexico	1:51.3A	Julio Morales; Puerto Rico	1:51.8A	Roberto Silva; Mexico	1:52.0A
1500 metres	Ricardo Palomares; Mexico	3:59.2A	José Neri; Mexico	3:59.3A	José Antonetti; Puerto Rico	4:04.7A
5000 metres	Concepción Salinas; Mexico	15:02.6A	Flavio Buendía; Mexico	15:27.2A	Julio Quevedo; Guatemala	16:02.0A
10,000 metres	Juan Martínez; Mexico	30:33.6A	Efraín Carmona; Mexico	31:11.0A	José Gonzales; Cuba	34:17.4A
Half marathon	Juan Martínez; Mexico	1:11:02A	Félix Carmona; Mexico	1:12:08A	José Gonzales; Cuba	1:16:25A
110 metres hurdles	Juan Morales; Cuba	14.6A	Lázaro Betancourt; Cuba	14.7A	David Cruz; Puerto Rico	16.4A
400 metres hurdles	Salvador Medina; Mexico	52.3A	Miguel Olivera; Cuba	52.4A	Césare Sánchez; Mexico	52.6A
3000 metres steeplechase	Carlos Vargas; Mexico	9:19.2A	Flavio Buendía; Mexico	9:19.4A	Manuel Pérez; Puerto Rico	10:33.6A
4 × 100 metres relay	Cuba; Lázaro Betancourt; Juan Morales; Hermes Ramírez; Félix Eugellés	40.3A				
4 × 400 metres relay	Mexico; Cesare Alejandro Sánchez; Frederico Vera; Roberto Silva; Salvador Medina	3:16.0A	Puerto Rico	3:18.3A	Cuba	3:21.2A
20 km road walk	José Pedraza; Mexico	1:46:31A	Pablo Colín; Mexico	1:50:41A	Euclides Calzado; Cuba	1:50:55A
High jump	Teodoro Palacios; Guatemala	2.05A	David Cruz; Puerto Rico	1.80A		
Pole vault	Rolando Cruz; Puerto Rico	4.50A	Roberto Fernández; Cuba	4.40A	José Seth; Guatemala	3.80A
Long jump	Abelardo Pacheco; Cuba	7.49A	David Cruz; Puerto Rico	7.46A	José Hernández; Cuba	7.44A
Triple jump	José Hernández; Cuba	15.54A	Guillermo Hoffner; Mexico	15.12A	David Douglas; Guatemala	13.47A
Shot put	Fidel Estrada; Cuba	16.42A	Benigno Hodelín; Cuba	15.75A	Carlos Yapur; Mexico	15.14A
Discus throw	Bárbaro Cañizares; Cuba	52.96A	Javier Moreno; Cuba	49.95A	Ignacio Reinosa; Puerto Rico	49.91A
Hammer throw	Enrique Samuells; Cuba	66.06A	Julián Núñez Arana; Mexico	49.67A	Pedro Granell; Puerto Rico	48.39A
Javelin throw	Francisco Mena; Cuba	69.60A	Edmundo Medina; Mexico	68.11A	Jorge García; Puerto Rico	68.10A
Pentathlon	Francisco Mena; Cuba	3440A	Donald Vélez; Nicaragua	2847A	Sergio Hernández; Mexico	2779A

=== Women's events ===
Event	Gold		Silver		Bronze	
100 metres	Cristina Hechavarria; Cuba	11.5A	Miguelina Cobián; Cuba	11.6A	Mercedes Román; Mexico	12.4A
200 metres	Miguelina Cobián; Cuba	23.9A	Violeta Quesada; Cuba	24.4A	Gladys Azcuaga; Mexico	26.0A
400 metres	Aurelia Pentón; Cuba	57.4A	Gladys Azcuaga; Mexico	59.5A	Lourdes García; Mexico	61.4A
800 metres	Aurelia Pentón; Cuba	2:24.1A	María Díaz; Mexico	2:24.3A	Ines Mondragón; Mexico	2:26.8A
80 metres hurdles	Marlene Elejalde; Cuba	11.6A	Daisy Hechevarría; Cuba	11.7A	Enriqueta Basilio; Mexico	12.1A
4 × 100 metres relay	Cuba; Marcia Garbey; Daisy Hechevarría; Violetta Quesada; Miguelina Cobián	45.1A	Mexico; Enriqueta Basilio; Mercedes Román; Gladys Azcuaga; María Haquet	49.6A	Guatemala; Rosa Armas; Luz Arellano; Ana María Piedrasanta; Regina Alquijay	52.5A
High jump	Marcia Garbey; Cuba	1.53A	Silvia Tapia; Mexico	1.45A		
Long jump	Irene Martínez; Cuba	5.65A	Marcia Garbey; Cuba	5.62A	Mercedes Román; Mexico	5.39A
Shot put	Hilda Ramírez; Cuba	13.59A	Grecia Hamilton; Cuba	13.02A	Guadalupe Lartigue; Mexico	12.28A
Discus throw	Caridad Agüero; Cuba	45.86A	Hilda Ramírez; Cuba	42.65A	Lili Schluter; Mexico	38.25A
Javelin throw	María Moreno; Cuba	49.94A	Hilda Ramírez; Cuba	41.66A	Martha Bravo; Mexico	38.26A
Pentathlon	Marlene Elejalde; Cuba	4186A	Mercedes Román; Mexico	4031A	Daisy Hechevarría; Cuba	4009A

A = affected by altitude

== Medal table ==
Rank	Nation	Gold	Silver	Bronze	Total
1	Cuba (CUB)	23	13	8	44
2	Mexico (MEX)	9	14	14	37
3	Puerto Rico (PUR)	2	6	6	14
4	Guatemala (GUA)	1	0	4	5
5	Nicaragua (NIC)	0	1	0	1
Totals (5 entries)		35	34	32	101
