= Athletics at the 1967 Pan American Games – Women's 4 × 100 metres relay =

Women's 4 × 100 metres relay at the Pan American Games

The women's 4 × 100 metres relay event at the 1967 Pan American Games was held in Winnipeg on 5 August.

== Results ==
Rank	Nation	Athletes	Time	Notes
1st place, gold medalist(s)	Cuba	Marcia Garbey, Cristina Echeverría, Violetta Quesada, Miguelina Cobián	44.63	
2nd place, silver medalist(s)	Canada	Judy Dallimore, Arleen McLaughlin, Jenny Meldrum, Irene Piotrowski	45.56	
3rd place, bronze medalist(s)	Jamaica	Carol Cummings, Una Morris, Audrey Reid, Vilma Charlton	47.17	
	United States	Janet MacFarlane, Jane Burnett, Dee Debusk, Barbara Ferrell	DQ	
	Mexico	Enriqueta Basilio, Gladys Azcuaga, Mercedes Román, Esperanza Girón	DQ	
