= Athletics at the 1963 Summer Universiade – Women's 4 × 100 metres relay =

The women's 4 × 100 metres relay event at the 1963 Summer Universiade was held at the Estádio Olímpico Monumental in Porto Alegre in September 1963.

== Results ==
Rank	Nation	Athletes	Time	Notes
1st place, gold medalist(s)	Soviet Union	Alla Chernyshova, Renāte Lāce, Vera Popkova, Tatyana Shchelkanova	46.5	
2nd place, silver medalist(s)	West Germany	Bärbel Palmi, Antje Gleichfeld, Elke Masnfeld, Jutta Heine	47.5	
3rd place, bronze medalist(s)	Cuba	Irene Martínez, Fulgencia Romay, Norma Pérez, Miguelina Cobián	47.5	
4	Great Britain	Joan Atkinson, Avril Usher-Bowring, Joy Catling, Susan Dennler	49.7	
5	Brazil	Astrid Hohne, Terezinha Matos Monte, Maria Regina Fabre, Margarida Bitencourt	52.8	
