= Athletics at the 1967 Pan American Games – Women's 100 metres =

Women's 100 metres at the Pan American Games

The women's 100 metres event at the 1967 Pan American Games was held in Winnipeg on 29 and 30 July.

== Medalists ==
| Gold | Silver | Bronze |
|---|---|---|
| Barbara Ferrell; United States | Miguelina Cobián; Cuba | Irene Piotrowski; Canada |

== Results ==
=== Heats ===
Wind:
Heat 1: +0.6 m/s, Heat 2: +0.7 m/s

| Rank | Heat | Name | Nationality | Time | Notes |
|---|---|---|---|---|---|
| 1 | 2 | Barbara Ferrell | United States | 11.38 | Q |
| 2 | 1 | Irene Piotrowski | Canada | 11.45 | Q |
| 3 | 2 | Miguelina Cobián | Cuba | 11.55 | Q |
| 4 | 1 | Cristina Echevarria | Cuba | 11.58 | Q |
| 5 | 1 | Janet MacFarlane | United States | 11.62 | Q |
| 6 | 2 | Vilma Charlton | Jamaica | 11.66 | Q |
| 7 | 1 | Esperanza Girón | Mexico | 11.94 | Q |
| 7 | 2 | Thora Best | Trinidad and Tobago | 11.94 | Q |
| 9 | 2 | Judith Dallimore | Canada | 12.04 | |
| 10 | 1 | Carol Cummings | Jamaica | 12.41 | |
| 11 | 1 | Cristina Irurzun | Argentina | 12.50 | |
| 12 | 2 | Alicia Barrera | Peru | 12.97 | |
| 13 | 2 | Rosa Catalina Armas | Guatemala | 13.03 | |
| 14 | 1 | María Azurduy | Bolivia | 13.71 | |
| | 2 | Alicia Kaufmanas | Argentina | DNS | |

=== Final ===
Wind: +0.1 m/s

| Rank | Lane | Name | Nationality | Time | Notes |
|---|---|---|---|---|---|
| 1st place, gold medalist(s) | 4 | Barbara Ferrell | United States | 11.59 | |
| 2nd place, silver medalist(s) | 3 | Miguelina Cobián | Cuba | 11.69 | |
| 3rd place, bronze medalist(s) | 2 | Irene Piotrowski | Canada | 11.78 | |
| 4 | 1 | Cristina Echevarria | Cuba | 11.93 | |
| 5 | 5 | Vilma Charlton | Jamaica | 11.94 | |
| 6 | 6 | Janet MacFarlane | United States | 12.00 | |
| 7 | 7 | Thora Best | Trinidad and Tobago | 12.16 | |
| 8 | 8 | Esperanza Girón | Mexico | 12.35 | |
