= Lorraine Dunn =

Panamanian sprinter

Lorraine Dunn Davis
Personal information
- Born: Lorraine Fay Dunn; 12 September 1942 Panama City, Panama
- Died: 16 October 2003 (aged 61) Glen Burnie, Maryland, United States
- Height: 1.64 m (5 ft 5 in)
- Weight: 58 kg (128 lb)

Sport
- Sport: Athletics
- Events: Sprinting, hurdling
- Club: TSU Tigerbelles, Nashville
Medal record
Women's Athletics
Representing Panama
Pan American Games
Bronze medal – third place	1963 São Paulo	200 metres
Central American and Caribbean Games
Gold medal – first place	1959 Caracas	4 x 100 metres relay
Silver medal – second place	1962 Kingston	80 metres hurdles
Bronze medal – third place	1962 Kingston	4 x 100 metres relay
Ibero-American Games
Gold medal – first place	1960 Santiago	4 x 100 metres relay
Silver medal – second place	1960 Santiago	200 metres

Lorraine Dunn (later Davis, 12 September 1942 – 16 October 2003) was a Panamanian sprinter and hurdler. She competed in the 4 × 100 metres relay at the 1960 and the 1964 Summer Olympics as well as the 80 metres hurdles in 1964. Dunn finished third in the 200 metres with a time of 24.7 seconds and finished fourth in the 80 metres hurdles at the 1963 Pan American Games. Dunn's international breakthrough came when she won a gold medal in the 4 x 100 metres relay at the 1959 Central American and Caribbean Games as a 16-year old. She also won a silver medal in the 80 metres hurdles and a bronze in the 4 x 100 metres relay at the 1962 Central American and Caribbean Games.

== Early life ==
Dunn was born in Panama City into a family of accomplished athletes. Her father was a competitive weightlifter before becoming an accountant for the Panama Canal, and her aunt Josephine Lewis Sampson held many of the country's records in hurdles (these records were in turn later broken by Dunn).

In 1960, Dunn, along with her relay teammates Silvia Hunte, Carlota Gooden and Jean Holmes-Mitchell, were the first female athletes to represent Panama at the Olympics. They set a Panamanian 4 x 100 metres women's relay record of 46.66 seconds that was not equalled until 2013.

After she graduated from high school in 1961, Wilma Rudolph's coach, the legendary Ed Temple, offered her a track scholarship to train under him at Tennessee State University. She competed for the powerhouse TSU Tigerbelles and graduated from Tennessee State with honours in 1965. The Tigerbelles dominated US women's track and field during this era. In fact, from 1960 to 1968 they did not lose an AAU National Championship and won nearly every single competitive team meet they participated in during those years.

In February 1964, Dunn, along with Wyomia Tyus, Vivian Brown and Edith McGuire, was on the Tigerbelles relay team that set an indoor world record of 47.5 seconds in the 440 yard relay at the Mason-Dixon Games at Freedom Hall, Louisville. Previously, TSU held the old world mark of 48.3 seconds.

== Olympics and beyond ==
At the opening ceremony of the 1964 Summer Olympics, Dunn served as the Panamanian flag bearer.

In her final year at TSU, Dunn was a member of the women's track and field team that won the AAU National Indoor Championships at Madison Square Garden, New York City. Dunn, Tyus, McGuire and Essie Crews made up the 640 yard relay team which won the event in a time of 1:11.7 after running a heat in a record-breaking 1:11.5.

After retiring from competitive athletics, Dunn settled in Peoria, Illinois and worked as an accountant for Caterpillar and Pabst Brewing Company.

In 1974, she briefly coached the University of Kansas women's cross-country and track teams.

Soon after, she moved to Fairfax County, Virginia and worked as an accountant for the National Bar Association. She was a member of the Northern Virginia chapter of the Delta Sigma Theta service sorority and past president of its educational and community service foundation. Dunn was past treasurer of both the Fairfax County Committee of 100 and the Fairfax County-wide PTA; a member of the Williamsburg Manor Civic Association; the Urban League; the NAACP; the Northern Virginia League of Women Voters; and St. Joseph's Catholic Church in Alexandria.

On 13 January 2000, in a statement which appeared in the newspaper El Siglo, the then-President of Panama, Mireya Moscoso, expressed her sincere appreciation to all Panamanian athletes who throughout the 20th century gave all of their effort to honour the country, nationally and internationally. Lorraine Dunn was among those athletes mentioned by name, along with the likes of Roberto Durán, Rod Carew and Lloyd LaBeach.

Dunn died of a heart attack in 2003. Survivors include her husband, John Davis of Alexandria; a daughter, Aisha Davis of Washington; a son, Kiilu Davis of Scottsdale; a sister, Lydia Harris; and two grandsons and a granddaughter. She was preceded in death by her youngest sister, Raquel Octavia Dunn.

== International competitions ==
Year	Competition	Venue	Position	Event	Notes
Representing Panama
1959	Central American and Caribbean Games	Caracas, Venezuela	4th	80 m hurdles	13.5
1959	Central American and Caribbean Games	Caracas, Venezuela	1st	4 × 100 m relay	50.51
1959	Central American and Caribbean Games	Caracas, Venezuela	7th	High jump	1.32 m
1959	Pan American Games	Chicago, United States	12th (h)	80 m hurdles	12.5
1960	Olympic Games	Rome, Italy	6th (h)	4 × 100 m relay	46.66
1960	Ibero-American Games	Santiago, Chile	2nd	200 m	25.7
1960	Ibero-American Games	Santiago, Chile	1st	4 × 100 m relay	47.2
1962	Central American and Caribbean Games	Kingston, Jamaica	2nd	80 m hurdles	11.7
1962	Central American and Caribbean Games	Kingston, Jamaica	3rd	4 × 100 m relay	47.7
1963	Pan American Games	São Paulo, Brazil	3rd	200 m	24.7
1963	Pan American Games	São Paulo, Brazil	4th	80 m hurdles	11.65
1963	Pan American Games	São Paulo, Brazil	4th	4 × 100 m relay	48.31
1964	Olympic Games	Tokyo, Japan	23rd (h)	80 m hurdles	11.5
1964	Olympic Games	Tokyo, Japan	12th (h)	4 × 100 m relay	47.6

== Personal bests ==
- 80 metres hurdles – 11.65 (1963)
