= Esperanza Girón =

Mexican sprinter (born 1947)

Personal information
- Full name: Esperanza Emma Girón Olivares
- Nationality: Mexican
- Born: 28 December 1947 (age 78) Guadalajara, Mexico
- Height: 1.61 m (5 ft 3 in)
- Weight: 50 kg (110 lb)

Sport
- Sport: Sprinting
- Event: 100 metres

Esperanza Emma Girón Olivares (born 28 December 1947) is a Mexican sprinter. She competed in the 100 metres at the 1964 Summer Olympics and the 1968 Summer Olympics.

== International competitions ==
Year	Competition	Venue	Position	Event	Notes
Representing Mexico
1962	Central American and Caribbean Games	Kingston, Jamaica	15th (h)	100 m	12.6
1962	Central American and Caribbean Games	Kingston, Jamaica	6th	4 × 100 m relay	50.2
1964	Olympic Games	Tokyo, Japan	35th (h)	100 m	12.2
1964	Olympic Games	Tokyo, Japan	27th (h)	200 m	25.3
1966	Central American and Caribbean Games	San Juan, Puerto Rico	9th (sf)	100 m	12.5
1966	Central American and Caribbean Games	San Juan, Puerto Rico	5th	200 m	26.0
1967	Pan American Games	Winnipeg, Canada	8th	100 m	12.35
1967	Pan American Games	Winnipeg, Canada	9th (h)	200 m	25.18
1967	Pan American Games	Winnipeg, Canada	10th (h)	80 m hurdles	12.28
1967	Pan American Games	Winnipeg, Canada	–	4 × 100 m relay	DQ
1968	Olympic Games	Mexico City, Mexico	39th (h)	100 m	12.2
1968	Olympic Games	Mexico City, Mexico	34th (h)	200 m	25.3
1968	Olympic Games	Mexico City, Mexico	12th (h)	4 × 100 m relay	47.0

== Personal bests ==
- 100 metres – 11.7h (1967)
- 200 metres – 24.2h (1968)
