= Roberto Silva =

Roberto Silva may refer to:

- Roberto Silva Renard (1855-1920), Chilean military figure
- Roberto Silva (athlete) (born 1947), Mexican runner
- Roberto Silva (Peruvian footballer) (born 1976), Peruvian footballer
- Roberto Silva (Portuguese footballer) (born 1982), Portuguese footballer
- Roberto Andrade Silva (born 1988), Brazilian footballer
- Roberto Mendes Silva (born 1979), Brazilian footballer
