= Athletics at the 1967 Pan American Games – Men's 1500 metres =

Men's 1500 metres at the Pan American Games

The men's 1500 metres event at the 1967 Pan American Games was held in Winnipeg on 4 and 5 August.

== Medalists ==
Gold	Silver	Bronze
Tom Von Ruden; United States	Sam Bair; United States	Dave Bailey; Canada

== Results ==
=== Heats ===
Rank	Heat	Name	Nationality	Time	Notes
1	1	Ray Haswell	Canada	3:47.64	Q
2	1	Byron Dyce	Jamaica	3:47.65	Q
3	1	Tom Von Ruden	United States	3:47.98	Q
4	1	José Neri	Mexico	3:48.97	Q
5	2	Dave Bailey	Canada	3:50.26	Q
6	2	Sam Bair	United States	3:50.92	Q
7	2	Ricardo Palomares	Mexico	3:51.39	Q
8	2	Jorge Grosser	Chile	3:52.30	Q
9	2	Orlando Gutiérrez	Colombia	3:54.06	
10	1	Hernando Castro	Colombia	3:55.98	
11	1	Ricardo Leguiza	Argentina	4:03.43	
12	2	José Esteban Valle	Nicaragua	4:05.20	
	1	Lennox Yearwood	Trinidad and Tobago	DNS	
	2	Domingo Amaisón	Argentina	DNS	
	2	Carver King	Trinidad and Tobago	DNS	

=== Final ===
Rank	Name	Nationality	Time	Notes
1st place, gold medalist(s)	Tom Von Ruden	United States	3:43.41	
2nd place, silver medalist(s)	Sam Bair	United States	3:44.17	
3rd place, bronze medalist(s)	Dave Bailey	Canada	3:44.93	
4	José Neri	Mexico	3:45.72	
5	Byron Dyce	Jamaica	3:46.61	
6	Ray Haswell	Canada	3:46.79	
7	Jorge Grosser	Chile	3:48.01	
8	Ricardo Palomares	Mexico	3:48.41	
