= Cristina Hechavarria =

Cuban sprinter

Personal information
- Born: 24 July 1948

Sport
- Sport: Athletics
- Event: 100 metres

Achievements and titles
- Personal best: 11.9 seconds (1966)
Medal record
Representing Cuba
Central American and Caribbean Games
Gold medal – first place	1970 Panama City	4x100 m relay
Silver medal – second place	1966 San Juan	100 m
Silver medal – second place	1966 San Juan	4x100m relay
Bronze medal – third place	1970 Panama City	100 m
Pan American Games
Gold medal – first place	1967 Winnipeg	4 × 100 m relay

Cristina Hechavarria (also known as Cristina Echevarria, born 24 July 1948) was a Cuban sprinter. She won the gold medal in the 4 × 100 metres relay at the 1967 Pan American Games, and the silver medal in the 100 metres at the 1966 Central American and Caribbean Games. She was the grandmother and first coach of 2016 Olympic silver-medalist Orlando Ortega. She died when Ortega was young, and in her remembrance Ortega kept all his medals at her house.

Her husband Orlando Ortega Sr. was a member of the Cuba national football team in the 1960s.

== International competitions ==
Year	Competition	Venue	Position	Event	Notes
Representing Cuba
1966	Central American and Caribbean Games	San Juan, Puerto Rico	2nd	100 m	11.79
1966	Central American and Caribbean Games	San Juan, Puerto Rico	2nd	4 × 100 m relay	46.5
1967	Pan American Games	Winnipeg, Canada	4th	100 m	11.93
1967	Pan American Games	Winnipeg, Canada	1st	4 × 100 m relay	44.63
1967	Central American and Caribbean Championships	Xalapa, Mexico	1st	100 m	11.5
1969	Central American and Caribbean Championships	Havana, Cuba	1st	4 × 100 m relay	45.9
1970	Central American and Caribbean Games	Panama City, Panama	3rd	100 m	11.6 (w)
1970	Central American and Caribbean Games	Panama City, Panama	1st	4 × 100 m relay	44.7
1970	Universiade	Turin, Italy	12th (sf)	100 m	12.3
