= Athletics at the 1970 Summer Universiade – Women's 100 metres =

The women's 100 metres event at the 1970 Summer Universiade was held at the Stadio Comunale in Turin on 2 and 3 September 1970.

== Medalists ==
Gold	Silver	Bronze
Renate Meißner; East Germany	Wilma van den Berg; Netherlands	Györgyi Balogh; Hungary

== Results ==
=== Heats ===
Held on 2 September

Wind:
Heat 1: +2.3 m/s

Rank	Heat	Athlete	Nationality	Time	Notes
1	1	Renate Meißner	East Germany	11.4	Q
2	1	Pat Hawkins	United States	11.8	Q
3	1	Cecilia Molinari	Italy	11.9	Q
4	1	Mariana Goth	Romania	12.0	
5	1	Kirsten Roggenkamp	West Germany	12.0	
6	1	Claudine Meire	France	12.2	
	1	Lilia Ben Attia	Tunisia	DNF	
1	2	Györgyi Balogh	Hungary	11.7	Q
2	2	Cristina Hechavarria	Cuba	11.9	Q
3	2	Barbara Ferrell	United States	11.9	Q
4	2	Marina Nikiforova	Soviet Union	12.0	q
5	2	Eva Glesková	Czechoslovakia	12.0	q
6	2	Carolina Rieuwpassa	Indonesia	12.2	
7	2	Dominique Descatoire	France	12.4	
1	3	Wilma van den Berg	Netherlands	11.5	Q
2	3	Heide Rosendahl	West Germany	11.6	Q
3	3	Della James	Great Britain	11.7	Q
4	2	Helga Kapfer	Austria	11.8	q
5	2	Bärbel Podeswa	East Germany	12.0	
6	2	Barbara Walisiak	Poland	12.2	
7	2	Bosede Osiname	Nigeria	12.8	
8	2	Janet Kohansedgh	Iran	13.2	
1	4	Judit Szabóné Havas	Hungary	11.7	Q
2	4	Miguelina Cobián	Cuba	11.8	Q
3	4	Lyudmila Zharkova	Soviet Union	11.9	Q
4	4	Jean O'Neill	Great Britain	12.2	
5	4	Henriette Vooys	Netherlands	12.2	
6	4	Erika Kren	Austria	12.3	
7	4	Irena Szewińska	Poland	12.3	
8	4	Elizabeth Sama	Nigeria	12.6	

=== Semifinals ===
Held on 3 September

Rank	Heat	Athlete	Nationality	Time	Notes
1	1	Renate Meißner	East Germany	11.8	Q
2	1	Györgyi Balogh	Hungary	12.0	Q
3	1	Della James	Great Britain	12.1	Q
4	1	Marina Nikiforova	Soviet Union	12.1	Q
5	1	Cecilia Molinari	Italy	12.2	
6	1	Pat Hawkins	United States	12.3	
7	1	Cristina Hechavarria	Cuba	12.3	
1	2	Wilma van den Berg	Netherlands	11.7	Q
2	2	Judit Szabóné Havas	Hungary	11.9	Q
3	2	Miguelina Cobián	Cuba	11.9	Q
4	2	Helga Kapfer	Austria	12.1	Q
5	2	Lyudmila Zharkova	Soviet Union	12.1	
6	2	Eva Glesková	Czechoslovakia	12.2	
7	2	Barbara Ferrell	United States	12.4	
	?	Heide Rosendahl	West Germany	?	

=== Final ===
Held on 3 September

Rank	Name	Nationality	Time	Notes
1st place, gold medalist(s)	Renate Meißner	East Germany	11.5	
2nd place, silver medalist(s)	Wilma van den Berg	Netherlands	11.6	
3rd place, bronze medalist(s)	Györgyi Balogh	Hungary	11.7	
4	Miguelina Cobián	Cuba	11.7	
5	Judit Szabóné Havas	Hungary	11.8	
6	Della James	Great Britain	11.9	
7	Helga Kapfer	Austria	11.9	
8	Marina Nikiforova	Soviet Union	12.0	
