= Ignacio Reinosa =

Puerto Rican discus thrower

Personal information
- Nationality: Puerto Rican
- Born: 9 May 1944 (age 81) Santurce, Puerto Rico
- Height: 1.83 m (6 ft 0 in)
- Weight: 86 kg (190 lb)

Sport
- Sport: Athletics
- Event: Discus throw

Ignacio Reinosa (born 9 May 1944) is a Puerto Rican athlete. He competed in the men's discus throw at the 1964 Summer Olympics, and the 1974 Central American and Caribbean Games.

His personal best in the discus throw is 53.06 metres set in 1968.

== International competitions ==
Year	Competition	Venue	Position	Event	Notes
Representing Puerto Rico
1962	Central American and Caribbean Games	Kingston, Jamaica	4th	Discus throw	45.77 m
1962	Ibero-American Games	Madrid, Spain	3rd	Discus throw	47.00 m
1964	Olympic Games	Tokyo, Japan	25th (q)	Discus throw	46.36 m
1966	Central American and Caribbean Games	San Juan, Puerto Rico	5th	Discus throw	46.48 m
1967	Central American and Caribbean Championships	Xalapa, Mexico	3rd	Discus throw	49.91 m
1969	Central American and Caribbean Championships	Havana, Cuba	3rd	Discus throw	48.92 m
1973	Central American and Caribbean Championships	Maracaibo, Venezuela	3rd	Discus throw	49.12 m
1974	Central American and Caribbean Games	Santo Domingo, Dominican Republic	3rd	Discus throw	49.30 m
