= 1969 Central American and Caribbean Championships in Athletics =

- Dates: 17–19 August
- Host city: Havana, Cuba
- Venue: Estadio Juan Abrantes

The 1969 Central American and Caribbean Championships in Athletics were held at the Estadio Juan Abrantes in Havana, Cuba between 17–19 August.

== Medal summary ==
=== Men's events ===
Event	Gold		Silver		Bronze	
100 metres	Hermes Ramírez; Cuba	10.4 CR	José Triana; Cuba	10.7	Carl Edmund; Panama	10.8
200 metres	Hermes Ramírez; Cuba	21.0 CR	Pedro Fernández; Cuba	21.5	Carl Edmund; Panama	21.8
400 metres	Juan Franceschi; Puerto Rico	47.0 CR	Garth Case; Jamaica	47.4	Antonio Álvarez; Cuba	47.9
800 metres	Luis Dubouchet; Cuba	1:50.1 CR	Herminio Isaac; Puerto Rico	1:51.5	Carlos Martínez; Mexico	1:53.2
1500 metres	Sergio González; Mexico	3:52.2 CR	Carlos Martínez; Mexico	3:53.2	Lázaro Valdivieso; Cuba	3:54.8
5000 metres	Sergio González; Mexico	14:59.4 CR	Andrés Romero; Mexico	15:00.8	Carlos Báez; Puerto Rico	15:37.0
10,000 metres	Sergio González; Mexico	31:13.3	Andrés Romero; Mexico	31:21.5	Felipe Chaviano; Cuba	32:46.4
Half marathon	Pablo Garrido; Mexico	1:08:53 CR	Jacinto Sabinal; Mexico	1:11:35	Patricio Larriñaga; Cuba	1:12:10
110 metres hurdles	Juan Morales; Cuba	14.4 CR	Pedro Fernández; Cuba	14.4	Richard Davis; Panama	17.0
400 metres hurdles	Miguel Olivera; Cuba	53.9	Juan García; Cuba	53.9	Richard Davis; Panama	67.0
3000 metres steeplechase	Antonio Villanueva; Mexico	9:04.0 CR	Rigoberto Mendoza; Cuba	9:06.6	Bulmaro Olguín; Mexico	9:08.5
4 × 100 metres relay	Jamaica; Leighton Priestley; Garth Case; Ashton Waite; Victor Lyle	42.2	Panama; Gilberto Ansell; Alberto Bloomfield; Jacinto Tejeda; Baptiste	43.4	Only 2 finishing teams	
4 × 400 metres relay	Cuba; Antonio Álvarez; Carlos Felipe Martínez; Manuel Montalvo; Rodobaldo Díaz	3:13.1 CR	Jamaica; Alfred Daley; Delroy Morgan; Leighton Priestley; Garth Case	3:15.8	Panama; Alberto Bloomfield; Lara; Jacinto Tejeda; Gilberto Ansell	3:20.5
20 km road walk	Pascual Ramírez; Mexico	1:39:57 CR	José Oliveros; Mexico	1:40:06	Euclides Calzado; Cuba	1:41:05
High jump	Miguel Durañona; Cuba	1.95	Bernabé Luaces; Cuba	1.95	Trevor Tennant; Jamaica	1.90
Pole vault	Roberto Moré; Cuba	4.52 CR	Jorge Miranda; Puerto Rico	4.10	Guillermo González; Puerto Rico	4.10
Long jump	Ernesto Boy; Cuba	7.46	David Cruz; Puerto Rico	7.33	Victor Brooks; Jamaica	7.31
Triple jump	José Hernández; Cuba	15.60 CR	Ricardo Carnejo; Cuba	15.56	Iván Baldayo; Venezuela	15.44
Shot put	Benigno Hodelín; Cuba	15.78	Modesto Mederos; Cuba	15.68	Jorge Marrero; Puerto Rico	14.78
Discus throw	Bárbaro Cañizares; Cuba	54.70 CR	Javier Moreno; Cuba	50.84	Ignacio Reinosa; Puerto Rico	48.92
Hammer throw	Víctor Suárez; Cuba	56.10	Jesús Fuentes; Cuba	53.60	Pedro Granell; Puerto Rico	53.56
Javelin throw	Salomón Robbins; Mexico	69.98 CR	Francisco Mena; Cuba	69.70	Julio Loredo; Cuba	69.50
Decathlon	Jesús Mirabal; Cuba	6492 CR	José Díaz; Cuba	6040		

=== Women's events ===
Event	Gold		Silver		Bronze	
100 metres	Miguelina Cobián; Cuba	11.6	Fulgencia Romay; Cuba	11.8	Margarita Martínez; Panama	12.8
200 metres	Miguelina Cobián; Cuba	23.8 CR	Violeta Quesada; Cuba	23.8	Margarita Martínez; Panama	25.8
400 metres	Carmen Trustée; Cuba	55.2 CR	Aurelia Pentón; Cuba	55.3	Lucía Quiroz; Mexico	58.5
800 metres	Carmen Trustée; Cuba	2:12.2 CR	Lucía Quiroz; Mexico	2:14.1	Aurelia Pentón; Cuba	2:14.9
100 metres hurdles	Lourdes Jones; Cuba	14.7 CR	Raquel Martínez; Cuba	14.7	Beatriz Aparicio; Panama	16.5
4 × 100 metres relay	Cuba; Miguelina Cobián; Fulgencia Romay; Cristina Hechavarria; Marcia Garbey	45.9	Panama; Rosalia Abadia; Nivia Trejos; Yolanda Knight; Margarita Martínez	50.3	Jamaica; Debbie Byfield-White; Carol Cummings; Colleen Livingstone; Janet Stanford	50.8
High jump	Hilda Fabré; Cuba	1.55 CR	Silvia Tapia; Mexico	1.55	Lucía Duquet; Cuba	1.55
Long jump	Marina Samuells; Cuba	6.08 CR	Marcia Garbey; Cuba	6.07	Carol Cummings; Jamaica	5.52
Shot put	Hilda Ramírez; Cuba	14.02 CR	Grecia Hamilton; Cuba	13.95	Guadalupe Lartigue; Mexico	13.00
Discus throw	Carmen Romero; Cuba	51.41 CR	María Cristina Betancourt; Cuba	47.78	Eileen Hibbert; Jamaica	38.52
Javelin throw	Milagros Bayard; Cuba	45.28	Tomasa Núñez; Cuba	42.72	Ana López; Panama	35.84
Pentathlon	Daisy Hechevarría; Cuba	3974	Josefa Reyes; Cuba	3640		

== Medal table ==
Rank	Nation	Gold	Silver	Bronze	Total
1	Cuba (CUB)	26	21	8	55
2	Mexico (MEX)	7	7	4	18
3	Puerto Rico (PUR)	1	3	5	9
4	Jamaica (JAM)	1	2	5	8
5	Panama (PAN)	0	2	9	11
6	Venezuela (VEN)	0	0	1	1
Totals (6 entries)		35	35	32	102
