= Marilyn White =

American sprinter

Personal information
- Full name: Marilyn Elaine White
- Born: October 17, 1944 (age 81) Los Angeles, California, U.S.
- Height: 5 ft 3 in (160 cm)
- Weight: 115 lb (52 kg)
Medal record
Women's Athletics
Representing the United States
Olympic Games
Silver medal – second place	1964 Tokyo	4x100 metre relay
Pan American Games
Bronze medal – third place	1963 São Paulo	100 metres
Gold medal – first place	1963 São Paulo	4x100 metre relay

Marilyn Elaine White (born October 17, 1944) is an American sprinter who specialized in the 100 metres.

She won a silver medal in the 4 x 100 metres relay at the 1964 Summer Olympics in Tokyo, with teammates Willye White, Wyomia Tyus and Edith McGuire. She also competed in the 100 meter dash, where she finished in fourth place with the same time as the silver and bronze medalists. She earlier won the bronze medal at the 1963 Pan Am Games.

== Early life ==
Marilyn White was raised in Los Angeles, CA and is the oldest of four children. She attended a diverse elementary school, Holy Cross, where she mixed with students from various backgrounds and she was exposed to a variety of languages spoken, including Spanish, Hungarian and Mandarin. She went to high school at Bishop Conaty-Our Lady of Loretto High School graduating in 1962. She competed for the L.A. Mercurettes track club. She was recruited to the team out of a dance class while in high school. Prior to Title IX, high schools did not offer sports for girls. At the 1963 Los Angeles Invitational she beat Olympic champion Wilma Rudolph and set the meet record.

She attended UCLA (University of California, Los Angeles) and was elected freshman class vice president in 1963. She was then offered an athletic scholarship to Pepperdine College, even though Pepperdine did not have a fully developed track program. Individually she wore her Pepperdine jersey at many high level meets.
