= Athletics at the 1967 Pan American Games – Men's discus throw =

Men's discus throw at the Pan American Games

The men's discus throw event at the 1967 Pan American Games was held in Winnipeg on 1 August.

== Results ==
Rank	Name	Nationality	Result	Notes
1st place, gold medalist(s)	Gary Carlsen	United States	57.50	
2nd place, silver medalist(s)	Rink Babka	United States	56.88	
3rd place, bronze medalist(s)	George Puce	Canada	56.20	
4	Bárbaro Cañizares	Cuba	51.80	
5	Javier Moreno	Cuba	51.14	
6	José Carlos Jacques	Brazil	49.15	
7	Dagoberto González	Colombia	48.34	
8	Ain Roost	Canada	46.08	
9	Gustavo Gutiérrez	Colombia	43.94	
10	Cecil Hylton	Jamaica	43.56	
