= Grecia Hamilton =

Cuban athlete

Personal information
- Full name: Grecia Hamilton Smith
- Born: 20 December 1942 (age 83)

Sport
- Sport: Athletics
- Event: Shot put

Grecia Hamilton Smith (born 20 December 1942) is a retired Cuban athlete who specialised in the shot put. She won several international medals at regional level including the silver at the 1971 Pan American Games.

== International competitions ==
Year	Competition	Venue	Position	Event	Notes
Representing Cuba
1966	Central American and Caribbean Games	San Juan, Puerto Rico	5th	Shot put	11.59 m
1967	Central American and Caribbean Championships	Xalapa, Mexico	2nd	Shot put	13.02 m
1969	Central American and Caribbean Championships	Havana, Cuba	2nd	Shot put	13.95 m
1970	Central American and Caribbean Games	Panama City, Panama	1st	Shot put	14.56 m
1971	Central American and Caribbean Championships	Kingston, Jamaica	2nd	Shot put	14.04 m
1971	Pan American Games	Cali, Colombia	2nd	Shot put	14.63 m
