= Javier Moreno (discus thrower) =

Cuban athlete

Personal information
- Full name: Francisco Javier Moreno Escalona
- Nationality: Cuban
- Born: 3 December 1942 (age 83)

Sport
- Sport: Athletics
- Event: Discus throw

Francisco Javier Moreno Escalona (born 3 December 1942) is a Cuban retired athlete who specialised in the discus throw. He won multiple medals at regional level.

== International competitions ==
Year	Competition	Venue	Position	Event	Notes
Representing Cuba
1966	Central American and Caribbean Games	San Juan, Puerto Rico	2nd	Discus throw	48.71 m
1967	Pan American Games	Winnipeg, Canada	5th	Discus throw	51.14 m
1967	Central American and Caribbean Championships	Xalapa, Mexico	2nd	Discus throw	49.95 m
1969	Central American and Caribbean Championships	Havana, Cuba	2nd	Discus throw	50.84 m
1970	Central American and Caribbean Games	Panama City, Panama	3rd	Discus throw	53.64 m
1971	Central American and Caribbean Championships	Kingston, Jamaica	2nd	Discus throw	54.44 m
1971	Pan American Games	Cali, Colombia	4th	Discus throw	57.90 m
1973	Central American and Caribbean Championships	Maracaibo, Venezuela	2nd	Discus throw	53.86 m
1974	Central American and Caribbean Games	Santo Domingo, Dominican Republic	2nd	Discus throw	51.04 m
1975	Central American and Caribbean Championships	Ponce, Puerto Rico	1st	Discus throw	53.24 m
1975	Pan American Games	Mexico City, Mexico	6th	Discus throw	56.52 m
