= Athletics at the 1964 Summer Olympics – Women's 200 metres =

Women's 200 metres at the Games of the XVIII Olympiad
- Venue: Olympic Stadium
- Dates: 18–19 October 1964
- Competitors: 42 from 27 nations
- Winning time: 23.0 OR

Medalists
1st place, gold medalist(s)		Edith McGuire; United States
2nd place, silver medalist(s)		Irena Kirszenstein; Poland
3rd place, bronze medalist(s)		Marilyn Black; Australia

The women's 200 metres was the second-shortest of the four women's track races in the Athletics at the 1964 Summer Olympics program in Tokyo. It was held on 18 October and 19 October 1964. 42 athletes from 27 nations entered, with 6 not starting in the first round. The first round and the semifinal were held on 18 October, with the final on 19 October. The winning margin was 0.1 seconds.

== Results ==
=== First round ===
The top two runners in each of the 6 heats advanced, as well as the next four fastest runners from across the heats.

==== First round, heat 1 ====
Wind: +5.0 m/s

Place	Athlete	Nation	Time (hand)	Time (automatic)
1	Janet Simpson	Great Britain	24.0	24.06
2	Eva Lehocká	Czechoslovakia	24.2	24.30
3	Joyce Bennett	Australia	24.3	24.34
4	Michele Lurot	France	24.7	24.75
5	Erzsébet Bartos	Hungary	24.9	24.90
6	E. E. Giron Olivares	Mexico	25.3	–
—	Halina Gorecka	Poland	Did not start	–

==== First round, heat 2 ====
Wind: +3.5 m/s

Place	Athlete	Nation	Time (hand)	Time (automatic)
1	Miguelina Cobián	Cuba	23.8	23.89
2	Barbara Sobotta	Poland	24.1	24.19
3	Irene Piotrowski	Canada	24.4	24.47
4	Inge Aigner	Austria	24.7	24.77
5	Susana Ritchie	Argentina	24.7	24.79
—	Margit Nemesházi	Hungary	Did not start	–
—	Ulla-Britt Wieslander	Sweden	Did not start	–

==== First round, heat 3 ====
Wind: +3.1 m/s

Place	Athlete	Nation	Time (hand)	Time (automatic)
1	Margaret Burvill	Australia	24.2	24.22
2	Heilwig Jacob	United Team of Germany	24.2	24.23
3	Galina Gaida	Soviet Union	24.4	24.45
4	Deborah Thompson	United States	24.6	24.62
5	Irene Muyanca	Uganda	27.6	–
—	Clarice Ahanotu	Nigeria	Did not start	–
—	Jean Mitchell	Panama	Did not start	–

==== First round, heat 4 ====
Wind: +1.0 m/s

Place	Athlete	Nation	Time (hand)	Time (automatic)
1	Lyudmila Samotyosova	Soviet Union	23.8	23.86
2	Dorothy Hyman	Great Britain	24.0	24.02
3	Vivian Brown	United States	24.1	24.17
4	Louise Sydranski	Israel	24.6	24.68
5	Adlin Mair	Jamaica	25.0	–
6	Kusolwan Soraja	Thailand	26.1	–
7	Marcela Daniel	Panama	26.6	–

==== First round, heat 5 ====
Wind: +2.9 m/s

Place	Athlete	Nation	Time (hand)	Time (automatic)
1	Edith McGuire	United States	23.4	23.47
2	Marilyn Black	Australia	23.7	23.78
3	Una Morris	Jamaica	24.2	24.24
4	Mona Sulaiman	Philippines	25.4	–
5	Song Yang Ja	South Korea	26.5	–
—	Jutta Heine	United Team of Germany	Disqualified	–
—	Maria Itkina	Soviet Union	Did not start	–

==== First round, heat 6 ====
Wind: +4.1 m/s

Place	Athlete	Nation	Time (hand)	Time (automatic)
1	Irena Kirszenstein	Poland	23.8	23.82
2	Daphne Arden	Great Britain	24.2	24.21
3	Doreen Porter	New Zealand	24.2	24.24
4	Erika Pollmann	United Team of Germany	24.4	24.44
5	Makiko Izawa	Japan	25.4	–
6	Delceita Oakley	Panama	26.2	–
7	Yeh Chu-mei	Taiwan	27.1	–

=== Semifinals ===
The top four runners in each of the two semifinals advanced to the final.

==== Semifinal 1 ====
Wind: +1.0 m/s

Place	Athlete	Nation	Time (hand)	Time (automatic)
1	Edith McGuire	United States	23.3	23.37
2	Irena Kirszenstein	Poland	23.6	23.62
3	Janet Simpson	Great Britain	23.7	23.75
4	Daphne Arden	Great Britain	24.0	24.01
5	Margaret Burvill	Australia	24.3	–
6	Eva Lehocká	Czechoslovakia	24.5	–
7	Joyce Bennett	Australia	24.7	–
—	Miguelina Cobián	Cuba	Disqualified	–

==== Semifinal 2 ====
Wind: +3.3 m/s

Place	Athlete	Nation	Time (hand)	Time (automatic)
1	Marilyn Black	Australia	23.4	23.42
2	Lyudmila Samotyosova	Soviet Union	23.7	23.74
3	Una Morris	Jamaica	23.7	23.77
4	Barbara Sobotta	Poland	23.7	23.78
5	Dorothy Hyman	Great Britain	23.9	23.93
6	Doreen Porter	New Zealand	24.0	24.03
7	Heilwig Jacob	United Team of Germany	24.1	24.10
8	Vivian Brown	United States	24.3	24.39

=== Final ===
Wind: +0.8 m/s

Place	Athlete	Nation	Time (hand)	Time (automatic)
1	Edith McGuire	United States	23.0 OR	23.05
2	Irena Kirszenstein	Poland	23.1	23.13
3	Marilyn Black	Australia	23.1	23.18
4	Una Morris	Jamaica	23.5	23.58
5	Lyudmila Samotyosova	Soviet Union	23.5	23.59
6	Barbara Sobotta	Poland	23.9	23.97
7	Janet Simpson	Great Britain	23.9	23.98
8	Daphne Arden	Great Britain	24.0	24.01
