= José Neri =

Mexican middle-distance runner

Personal information
- Born: 27 June 1946 (age 80) Mexico City, Mexico
- Height: 1.73 m (5 ft 8 in)
- Weight: 62 kg (137 lb)

Sport
- Sport: Middle-distance running
- Event: 1500 metres

José Socorro Neri Valenzuela (born 27 June 1946) is a Mexican middle-distance runner. He competed in the men's 1500 metres at the 1968 Summer Olympics.

== International competitions ==
Year	Competition	Venue	Position	Event	Notes
Representing Mexico
1966	Central American and Caribbean Games	San Juan, Puerto Rico	10th (h)	800 m	1:56.9
1966	Central American and Caribbean Games	San Juan, Puerto Rico	3rd	1500 m	3:52.4
1966	Central American and Caribbean Games	San Juan, Puerto Rico	2nd	5000 m	14:56.4
1967	Pan American Games	Winnipeg, Canada	4th	1500 m	3:45.72
1967	Central American and Caribbean Championships	Xalapa, Mexico	2nd	1500 m	3:59.3
1968	Olympic Games	Mexico City, Mexico	12th (h)	1500 m	3:47.88
1970	Central American and Caribbean Games	Panama City, Panama	5th (h)	800 m	1:55.1
1970	Central American and Caribbean Games	Panama City, Panama	6th (h)	1500 m	3:55.3
1974	Central American and Caribbean Games	Santo Domingo, Dominican Republic	6th (h)	1500 m	3:49.49
1974	Central American and Caribbean Games	Santo Domingo, Dominican Republic	3rd	5000 m	14:04.0

== Personal bests ==
- 1500 metres – 3:41.6 (1968)
