= Athletics at the 1963 Pan American Games – Women's 100 metres =

Women's 100 metres at the Pan American Games

The women's 100 metres event at the 1963 Pan American Games was held at the Pacaembu Stadium in São Paulo on 27 and 28 April.

== Medalists ==
Gold	Silver	Bronze
Edith McGuire; United States	Miguelina Cobián; Cuba	Marilyn White; United States

== Results ==
=== Heats ===
Rank	Heat	Name	Nationality	Time	Notes
1	2	Edith McGuire	United States	11.67	Q
2	1	Miguelina Cobián	Cuba	11.80	Q
3	3	Marilyn White	United States	11.94	Q
4	1	Maureen Bardoe	Canada	11.97	Q
5	2	Fulgencia Romay	Cuba	12.02	Q
6	3	Jean Holmes	Panama	12.04	Q
7	2	Sybil Donmartin	Trinidad and Tobago	12.06	
8	1	Sigrid Sandiford	Trinidad and Tobago	12.23	
9	3	Erica da Silva	Brazil	12.33	
10	2	Joanne Rootsaert	Canada	12.67	
11	2	Marcela Daniel	Panama	12.75	
12	1	Wanda dos Santos	Brazil	16.1	
	1	Marisol Masot	Chile	DNS	
	3	Carlota Ulloa	Chile	DNS	
	3	Gisela Vidal	Venezuela	DNS	

=== Final ===
Rank	Name	Nationality	Time	Notes
1st place, gold medalist(s)	Edith McGuire	United States	11.65	
2nd place, silver medalist(s)	Miguelina Cobián	Cuba	11.69	
3rd place, bronze medalist(s)	Marilyn White	United States	11.85	
4	Jean Holmes	Panama	12.00	
5	Fulgencia Romay	Cuba	12.01	
6	Maureen Bardoe	Canada	12.09	
