= Érica da Silva =

Brazilian sprinter

Personal information
- Nickname: Gazela Negra
- Born: Érica Lopes da Silva; 24 July 1936 Porto Alegre, Brazil

Sport
- Sport: Sprinting
- Events: 100 metres, 200 metres
- Club: Renner<be>Grêmio; Flamengo

Érica Lopes da Silva (born 24 July 1936) is a retired Brazilian sprinter. She won multiple medals at regional level including a relay medal at the 1963 Pan American Games.

In 1966, she married a fellow athlete Antônio Fernando and retired from the track. She was a cousin of footballer Ortunho.

== International competitions ==
Year	Competition	Venue	Position	Event	Notes
Representing Brazil
1958	South American Championships	Montevideo, Uruguay	5th	100 m	12.8
1958	South American Championships	Montevideo, Uruguay	2nd	200 m	25.6
1958	South American Championships	Montevideo, Uruguay	1st	4 × 100 m relay	48.7
1960	Ibero-American Games	Santiago, Chile	9th (h)	100 m	12.9
1960	Ibero-American Games	Santiago, Chile	5th	200 m	26.3
1960	Ibero-American Games	Santiago, Chile	4th	4 × 100 m relay	49.6
1961	South American Championships	Lima, Peru	4th	100 m	12.7
1961	South American Championships	Lima, Peru	4th	200 m	26.1
1961	South American Championships	Lima, Peru	1st	4 × 100 m relay	48.9
1962	Ibero-American Games	Madrid, Spain	2nd	100 m	12.3
1962	Ibero-American Games	Madrid, Spain	2nd	200 m	25.5
1962	Ibero-American Games	Madrid, Spain	3rd	4 × 100 m relay	49.4
1963	Pan American Games	São Paulo, Brazil	9th (h)	100 m	12.33
1963	Pan American Games	São Paulo, Brazil	8th (h)	200 m	25.27
1963	Pan American Games	São Paulo, Brazil	3rd	4 × 100 m relay	48.18
1963	South American Championships	Cali, Colombia	1st	100 m	12.0
1963	South American Championships	Cali, Colombia	1st	200 m	24.3
1963	South American Championships	Cali, Colombia	1st	4 × 100 m relay	47.6
1965	South American Championships	Rio de Janeiro, Brazil	2nd	100 m	12.4
1965	South American Championships	Rio de Janeiro, Brazil	2nd	200 m	25.6
1965	South American Championships	Rio de Janeiro, Brazil	1st	4 × 100 m relay	47.7
