= Makiko Izawa =

Japanese sprinter

Personal information
- Nationality: Japanese
- Born: 15 August 1946 (age 79)

Sport
- Sport: Sprinting
- Event: 200 metres

Makiko Izawa (伊沢 まき子, Izawa Makiko; born 15 August 1946) is a Japanese sprinter. She competed in the women's 200 metres at the 1964 Summer Olympics.
