= Una Morris =

Jamaican sprinter (born 1947)

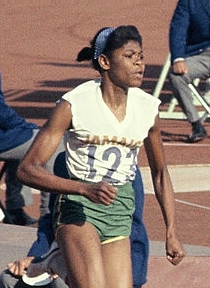
- Una Morris at the 1964 Olympics

Personal information
- Born: Una Lorraine Morris; 17 January 1947 (age 79) Kingston, Jamaica
- Height: 1.80 m (5 ft 11 in)
- Weight: 58 kg (128 lb)

Sport
- Sport: Athletics
- Event: Sprint
- Club: Kingston Technical High School; Cal Poly Pomona Broncos

Achievements and titles
- Personal best(s): 100 m – 11.4 (1968); 200 m – 23.58 (1964); 400 m – 53.9 (1966)
Medal record
Representing Jamaica
Pan American Games
Bronze medal – third place	1967 Winnipeg	4×100 m relay
British Empire and Commonwealth Games
Bronze medal – third place	1966 Kingston	440 yd
Bronze medal – third place	1966 Kingston	4×110 yd relay
Central American and Caribbean Games
Gold medal – first place	1966 San Juan	200 m
Gold medal – first place	1966 San Juan	4x100 m relay

Una Lorraine Morris (born 17 January 1947) is a retired Jamaican sprinter, physician, restaurateur, and food caterer. She represented Jamaica at the 1964, 1968 and 1972 Summer Olympics in eight sprint events in total, with the best achievement of fourth place in the 200 metres in 1964. She won a bronze medal in the 4×100 metres relay at the 1967 Pan American Games. in 1963 and 1964 she was chosen as Jamaican Sportswoman of the Year.

Currently, she is a radiologist, and was the owner of the Kingston Cafe restaurant in Pasadena, California, which was featured on an episode of the American television reality show Kitchen Nightmares with Gordon Ramsay in 2011. At that time her son, Keone was also involved in the restaurant. In August 2018, the restaurant closed and was converted into a catering business.

== International competitions ==
Year	Competition	Venue	Position	Event	Notes
Representing Jamaica
1964	British West Indies Championships	Kingston, Jamaica	1st	200 m	24.1
1964	British West Indies Championships	Kingston, Jamaica	1st	400 m	58.0
1964	Olympic Games	Tokyo, Japan	4th	200 m	23.5
1964	Olympic Games	Tokyo, Japan	12th (sf)	400 m	54.9
1964	Olympic Games	Tokyo, Japan	8th (h)	4 × 100 m relay	46.0
1965	British West Indies Championships	Bridgetown, Barbados	1st	400 m	57.3
1966	Central American and Caribbean Games	San Juan, Puerto Rico	1st	200 m	24.2
1966	Central American and Caribbean Games	San Juan, Puerto Rico	1st	4 × 100 m relay	46.2
1966	British Empire and Commonwealth Games	Kingston, Jamaica	6th	220 y	24.3
1966	British Empire and Commonwealth Games	Kingston, Jamaica	3rd	440 y	54.2
1966	British Empire and Commonwealth Games	Kingston, Jamaica	3rd	4 × 110 y relay	45.6
1967	Pan American Games	Winnipeg, Canada	6th	200 m	24.07
1967	Pan American Games	Winnipeg, Canada	3rd	4 × 100 m relay	47.17
1968	Olympic Games	Mexico City, Mexico	13th (sf)	200 m	23.5
1968	Olympic Games	Mexico City, Mexico	13th (sf)	400 m	54.6
1968	Olympic Games	Mexico City, Mexico	–	4 × 100 m relay	DQ
1970	British Commonwealth Games	Edinburgh, United Kingdom	28th (h)	200 m	26.0
1972	Olympic Games	Munich, West Germany	15th (qf)	200 m	23.62
1972	Olympic Games	Munich, West Germany	9th (h)	4 × 400 m relay	3:31.98
