= Miguelina Cobián =

Cuban sprinter (1941–2019)

Personal information
- Full name: Miguelina Cobián Hechevarria
- Born: 19 December 1941 Santiago de Cuba, Cuba
- Died: 1 December 2019 (aged 77) Havana, Cuba
- Height: 170 cm (5 ft 7 in)
- Weight: 63 kg (139 lb)
Medal record
Women's Athletics
Representing Cuba
Olympic Games
Silver medal – second place	1968 Mexico City	4x100 m relay
Pan American Games
Gold medal – first place	1967 Winnipeg	4x100 m relay
Silver medal – second place	1963 São Paulo	100 metres
Silver medal – second place	1963 São Paulo	200 metres
Silver medal – second place	1963 São Paulo	4x100 m relay
Silver medal – second place	1967 Winnipeg	100 metres
Bronze medal – third place	1967 Winnipeg	200 metres
Central American and Caribbean Games
Gold medal – first place	1962 Kingston	100 metres
Gold medal – first place	1966 San Juan	100 metres
Gold medal – first place	1970 Panama City	100 metres
Gold medal – first place	1970 Panama City	200 metres
Gold medal – first place	1970 Panama City	4x100 m relay
Silver medal – second place	1962 Kingston	4x100 m relay
Silver medal – second place	1966 San Juan	200 metres
Silver medal – second place	1966 San Juan	4x100 m relay
Central American and Caribbean Championships
Gold medal – first place	1967 Xalapa	200 metres
Gold medal – first place	1969 Havana	100 metres
Gold medal – first place	1969 Havana	200 metres
Silver medal – second place	1967 Xalapa	100 metres
Universiade
Silver medal – second place	1965 Sofia	100 m
Silver medal – second place	1965 Sofia	200 m
Bronze medal – third place	1963 Porto Alegre	100 m
Bronze medal – third place	1963 Porto Alegre	200 m

Miguelina Cobián Hechevarria (Note: In this Spanish name, the first or paternal surname is Cobián and the second or maternal family name is Hechevarria.) (19 December 1941 – 1 December 2019) was a Cuban sprinter. She was a member of the 4 x 100 metres relay team that won a silver at the 1968 Summer Olympics, the first Olympic medal ever achieved by Cuban women.

After retiring from competition, she coached youth athletes in the Sports Initiation Schools and the Superior School of Athletic Improvement. In November 2005, she was inducted into the Central American and Caribbean Confederation Hall of Fame.

Cobián died on 1 December 2019 at the age of 77.

== International competitions ==
Year	Competition	Venue	Position	Event	Notes
Representing Cuba
1962	Central American and Caribbean Games	Kingston, Jamaica	1st	100 m	12.08
1962	Central American and Caribbean Games	Kingston, Jamaica	2nd	4 × 100 m relay	47.3
1962	Ibero-American Games	Madrid, Spain	1st	100 m	12.3
1962	Ibero-American Games	Madrid, Spain	1st	200 m	25.3
1963	Pan American Games	São Paulo, Brazil	2nd	100 m	11.69
1963	Pan American Games	São Paulo, Brazil	2nd	200 m	24.0
1963	Pan American Games	São Paulo, Brazil	2nd	4 × 100 m relay	46.44
1963	Universiade	Porto Alegre, Brazil	3rd	100 m	12.4
1963	Universiade	Porto Alegre, Brazil	3rd	200 m	24.74
1963	Universiade	Porto Alegre, Brazil	3rd	4 × 100 m relay	47.5
1964	Olympic Games	Tokyo, Japan	5th	100 m	11.7
1964	Olympic Games	Tokyo, Japan	3rd (h)	200 m	23.8^{1}
1965	Universiade	Budapest, Hungary	2nd	100 m	11.5
1965	Universiade	Budapest, Hungary	2nd	200 m	23.9
1966	Central American and Caribbean Games	San Juan, Puerto Rico	1st	100 m	11.69
1966	Central American and Caribbean Games	San Juan, Puerto Rico	2nd	200 m	24.8
1966	Central American and Caribbean Games	San Juan, Puerto Rico	2nd	4 × 100 m relay	46.5
1967	Pan American Games	Winnipeg, Canada	2nd	100 m	11.69
1967	Pan American Games	Winnipeg, Canada	3rd	200 m	23.89
1967	Pan American Games	Winnipeg, Canada	1st	4 × 100 m relay	44.63
1967	Central American and Caribbean Championships	Xalapa, Mexico	2nd	100 m	11.6
1967	Central American and Caribbean Championships	Xalapa, Mexico	1st	200 m	23.9
1967	Central American and Caribbean Championships	Xalapa, Mexico	1st	4 × 100 m relay	45.1
1968	Olympic Games	Mexico City, Mexico	9th (h)	100 m	11.6
1968	Olympic Games	Mexico City, Mexico	9th (sf)	200 m	23.3
1968	Olympic Games	Mexico City, Mexico	2nd	4 × 100 m relay	43.36
1969	Central American and Caribbean Championships	Havana, Cuba	1st	100 m	11.6
1969	Central American and Caribbean Championships	Havana, Cuba	1st	200 m	23.8
1969	Central American and Caribbean Championships	Havana, Cuba	1st	4 × 100 m relay	45.9
1970	Central American and Caribbean Games	Panama City, Panama	1st	100 m	11.4 (w)
1970	Central American and Caribbean Games	Panama City, Panama	1st	200 m	23.5
1970	Central American and Caribbean Games	Panama City, Panama	1st	4 × 100 m relay	44.7
1970	Universiade	Turin, Italy	4th	100 m	11.7
1970	Universiade	Turin, Italy	4th	200 m	23.7

^{1}Disqualified in the final

== Personal bests ==
- 100 metres (hand timing) – 11.3h (Havana 1965)
- 100 metres (electronic timing) – 11.41 A (Mexico City 1968)
- 200 metres (hand timing) – 23.2h (Zurich 1969)
- 200 metres (electronic timing) – 23.39 A (Mexico City 1968)
