= Benigno Hodelín =

Cuban athlete

Personal information
- Full name: Benigno Otto Hodelín Rivera
- Nationality: Cuban

Sport
- Sport: Athletics
- Event: Shot put

Benigno Otto Hodelín Rivera is a retired Cuban athlete who specialised in the shot put. He won multiple medals at regional level.

== International competitions ==
Year	Competition	Venue	Position	Event	Notes
Representing Cuba
1966	Central American and Caribbean Games	San Juan, Puerto Rico	3rd	Shot put	15.34 m
1967	Central American and Caribbean Championships	Xalapa, Mexico	2nd	Shot put	15.75 m
1969	Central American and Caribbean Championships	Havana, Cuba	1st	Shot put	15.78 m
1970	Central American and Caribbean Games	Panama City, Panama	1st	Shot put	16.46 m
1971	Central American and Caribbean Championships	Kingston, Jamaica	1st	Shot put	15.76 m
1971	Pan American Games	Cali, Colombia	6th	Shot put	16.21 m
1973	Central American and Caribbean Championships	Maracaibo, Venezuela	2nd	Shot put	15.78 m
1974	Central American and Caribbean Games	Santo Domingo, Dominican Republic	4th	Shot put	15.69 m
1974	Central American and Caribbean Games	Santo Domingo, Dominican Republic	5th	Discus throw	46.80 m
