= Willye White =

American athlete (1939–2007)

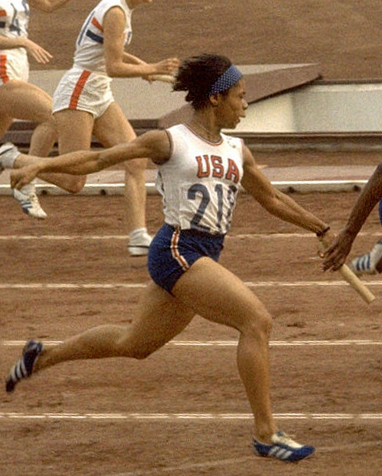
- White running at the 1964 Summer Olympics

Personal information
- Born: December 31, 1939 Money, Mississippi, U.S.
- Died: February 6, 2007 (aged 67) Chicago, Illinois, U.S.
- Height: 1.63 m (5 ft 4 in)
- Weight: 56 kg (123 lb)

Sport
- Sport: Athletics
- Event(s): Sprint, long jump
- Club: Mayor Daley Youth Foundation, Chicago
- Coached by: Ed Temple

Achievements and titles
- Personal best(s): 100 m – 11.5 (1964); LJ – 6.55 m (1964)
Medal record
Representing the United States
Olympic Games
Silver medal – second place	1956 Melbourne	Long jump
Silver medal – second place	1964 Tokyo	4×100 m
Pan American Games
Gold medal – first place	1963 São Paulo	Long Jump
Bronze medal – third place	1967 Winnipeg	Long jump

Willye Brown White (December 31, 1939 – February 6, 2007) was an American track and field athlete who took part in five Olympics from 1956 to 1972. She was America's best female long jumper of the time and also competed in the 100 meters sprint. White was a Tennessee State University Tigerbelle under Coach Ed Temple. An African-American, White was the first U.S. athlete to compete in track in five Olympics.

White is an inductee in the United States Olympic and Paralympic Hall of Fame. A public park in Chicago is named in her honor.

== Athletic career ==
White was a 16-year-old sophomore in high school when she won a silver medal in the long jump in the 1956 games in Melbourne, Australia. It marked the first time an American woman ever won a medal in that event. She won her second silver medal in 1964 as a member of the 400-meter relay team, along with Wyomia Tyus, Marilyn White and Edith McGuire.

During her career White won 13 national indoor and outdoor titles and set seven U.S. records in the long jump. Her last record of 6.55 m stood from 1964 until 1972. She was a member of more than 30 international track and field teams and won a dozen Amateur Athletic Union long jump titles in her career, according to USA Track & Field, which inducted her into its hall of fame in 1981 — one of her 11 sports hall of fame inductions. In 1999, Sports Illustrated for Women named her one of the 100 greatest women athletes in the 20th century.

== Biography ==
Born in Money, Mississippi, and raised by her grandparents, she picked cotton to help her family earn money, while at the same time competing in sports. A longtime Chicago-area resident, she credited her experience as an athlete with allowing her to see beyond the racism and hatred that surrounded her as a child.

White moved to Chicago in 1960 and became a nurse, first at Cook County Hospital, then at the Greenwood Medical Center. In 1965 she got a job of a public health administrator at the Chicago Health Department, and in 1976 earned a bachelor's degree from Chicago State University. In those years White was active as an athletics coach, preparing the national team to the 1981 World Cup and 1994 U.S. Olympic Festival. In 1990, she founded WBW Hang on Productions, a sports and fitness consultancy, and in 1991 the Willye White Foundation. The Foundation aimed to help children and included an after-school program, a summer day-camp and healthcare. She also served as director of the Chicago Park District.

White died of pancreatic cancer at Northwestern Memorial Hospital, according to Sarah Armantrout, a longtime friend who was with White when she died.
