= Debbie Thompson =

American sprinter (1942–2019)

Personal information
- Born: July 5, 1942 Frederick, Maryland, United States
- Died: November 17, 2019 (aged 77)

Sport
- Sport: Sprinting
- Event: 200 metres
- Club: Frederick Track Club

Debbie Thompson (July 5, 1942 – November 17, 2019) was an American sprinter. She competed in the women's 200 metres at the 1964 Summer Olympics.
