= Marilyn Black =

Australian sprinter

Olympic medal record

Women's Athletics
Bronze medal – third place	1964 Tokyo	200 metres

Marilyn Mary Black (born 20 May 1944 in New South Wales, Australia) is a former Olympic Australian sprinter, who after her marriage to fellow Australian sprinter Peter Vassella became known as Marilyn Vassella. Black was educated at Fort Street High School in Sydney. She was a primary school teacher at Dulwich Hill primary school for two years in 1963/64.

Black first received attention at the age of seventeen, when she won the 100 yards race in the New South Wales championships. In 1963 she won the 4 x 100 yards event with the NSW relay team. At the 1964 Summer Olympics in Tokyo she won the bronze medal in the 200 metres event.

Her pbs were 11.4 in the 100m, And 23.18 for the 200m which she ran in the Tokyo Olympics.
