= Vilma Charlton =

Jamaican sprinter (born 1946)

Personal information
- Nationality: Jamaican
- Born: 7 December 1946 (age 79) Keith, Saint Ann Parish, Jjamaica
- Height: 1.65 m (5 ft 5 in)
- Weight: 56 kg (123 lb)

Sport
- Sport: Sprinting
- Event: 100 metres
- College team: Pepperdine Waves
Medal record
Representing Jamaica
Central American and Caribbean Games
Gold medal – first place	1966 San Juan	4x100 m relay
Bronze medal – third place	1966 San Juan	200 m

Vilma Charlton (born 7 December 1946) is a Jamaican sprinter. She competed in the women's 100 metres at the 1968 Summer Olympics.

== International competitions ==
Year	Competition	Venue	Position	Event	Notes
Representing Jamaica
1964	Olympic Games	Tokyo, Japan	8th (h)	4 × 100 m relay	46.0
1965	British West Indies Championships	Bridgetown, Barbados	1st	200 m	24.2
1966	Central American and Caribbean Games	San Juan, Puerto Rico	5th	100 m	12.2
1966	Central American and Caribbean Games	San Juan, Puerto Rico	3rd	200 m	24.9
1966	Central American and Caribbean Games	San Juan, Puerto Rico	1st	4 × 100 m relay	46.2
1966	British Empire and Commonwealth Games	Kingston, Jamaica	6th	100 y	10.9
1966	British Empire and Commonwealth Games	Kingston, Jamaica	7th	220 y	24.4
1966	British Empire and Commonwealth Games	Kingston, Jamaica	3rd	4 × 110 y relay	45.6
1967	Pan American Games	Winnipeg, Canada	5th	100 m	11.94
1967	Pan American Games	Winnipeg, Canada	5th	200 m	24.03
1967	Pan American Games	Winnipeg, Canada	3rd	4 × 100 m relay	47.17
1968	Olympic Games	Mexico City, Mexico	23rd (h)	100 m	11.7
1968	Olympic Games	Mexico City, Mexico	30th (h)	200 m	24.3
1968	Olympic Games	Mexico City, Mexico	–	4 × 100 m relay	DQ
1972	Olympic Games	Munich, West Germany	–	4 × 100 m relay	DQ

== Personal bests ==
- 100 metres – 11.66 (1967)
- 200 metres – 23.6h (1967)
