= Athletics at the 1966 Central American and Caribbean Games =

Athletics at the X CAC Games
- Dates: 16–22 June 1966
- Host city: San Juan, Puerto Rico
- Venue: Estadio Municipal Hiram Bithorn
- Events: 32
- Participation: 338 athletes from 17 nations

The athletics competition in the 1966 Central American and Caribbean Games were held at the Estadio Municipal Hiram Bithorn in San Juan, Puerto Rico between 16 and 22 June.

It was the first edition to hold women's 200 metres and shot put as well as men's 10,000 metres walk. It was also the last to hold men's pentathlon, which was to be replaced with the decathlon from the next edition on.

== Medal summary ==
=== Men's events ===
Event	Gold		Silver		Bronze	
100 metres	Enrique Figuerola; Cuba	10.2 =GR	Edwin Roberts; Trinidad and Tobago	10.3	Carl Plaskett; U.S. Virgin Islands	10.5
200 metres	Edwin Roberts; Trinidad and Tobago	20.8 /20.70? GR	Carl Plaskett; U.S. Virgin Islands	21.4 /21.21?	Enrique Figuerola; Cuba	21.5 /21.24?
400 metres	Juan "Papo" Franceschi; Puerto Rico	46.7 /46.77? GR	Rupert Hoilette; Jamaica	46.9 /47.03?	Rodobaldo Díaz; Cuba	47.0 /47.10?
800 metres	Neville Myton; Jamaica	1:50.2 GR	Lennox Yearwood; Trinidad and Tobago	1:51.7	Benedict Cayenne; Trinidad and Tobago	1:54.3
1500 metres	Álvaro Mejía; Colombia	3:50.3 GR	Orlando Martínez; Puerto Rico	3:52.4	José Neri; Mexico	3:52.4
5000 metres	Álvaro Mejía; Colombia	14:42.6	José Neri; Mexico	14:56.4	Valentín Robles; Mexico	15:33.2
10,000 metres	Álvaro Mejía; Colombia	31:34.0	Valentín Robles; Mexico	32:11.0	Juan Martínez; Mexico	32:13.0
Half marathon	Valentín Robles; Mexico	1:13:47	Pedro Cárdenas; Colombia	1:14:24	Antonio Ibarra; Mexico	1:17:01
110 metres hurdles	Hernando Arrechea; Colombia	14.2w	Ray Harvey; Jamaica	14.4w	Juan Morales; Cuba	14.5w
400 metres hurdles	Heriberto Cruz; Puerto Rico	52.4	Víctor Maldonado; Venezuela	52.5	Arístides Pineda; Venezuela	53.5
3000 metre steeplechase	Flavio Buendía; Mexico	9:32.6	Rolf Duwe; Venezuela	9:37.8	Rigoberto Mendoza; Cuba	9:38.4
4 × 100 metres relay	Jamaica; Wellesley Clayton; Pablo McNeil; Ernest Headley; Michael Fray	40.5	Trinidad and Tobago; Cipriani Phillips; Winston Short; Henry Noel; Edwin Roberts	40.6	Cuba; Félix Eugellés; Juan Morales; Manuel Montalvo; Enrique Figuerola	40.6
4 × 400 metres relay	Jamaica; Clifton Forbes; Melville Spence; Neville Myton; Rupert Hoilette	3:08.8 GR	Trinidad and Tobago; Ben Cayenne; Lennox Yearwood; Edwin Skinner; Edwin Roberts	3:09.4	Puerto Rico; Juan Franceschi; Rafael Vega; José Andino; Germán Guenard	3:10.3
10,000 metre track walk	José Pedraza; Mexico	51:32.4 GR	Euclides Calzado; Cuba	51:43.4	David Jiménez; Cuba	52:17.8
High jump	Teodoro Palacios; Guatemala	2.03 GR	Anton Norris; Barbados	1.98	Luis Planchart; Venezuela	1.93
Pole vault	Rolando Cruz; Puerto Rico	4.54	Rubén Cruz; Puerto Rico	4.30	Luis Quintero; Colombia	4.15
Long jump	Wellesley Clayton; Jamaica	7.64	Abelardo Pacheco; Cuba	7.55	Byron Lewis; Jamaica	7.51
Triple jump	Tim Barrett; Bahamas	15.76 GR	José Hernández; Cuba	15.72	Trevor Thomas; Jamaica	15.42
Shot put	Fidel Estrada; Cuba	15.36 GR	Roy Hollingsworth; Trinidad and Tobago	15.36 GR	Benigno Hodelín; Cuba	15.34
Discus throw	Roy Hollingsworth; Trinidad and Tobago	52.10 GR	Javier Moreno; Cuba	48.71	Dagoberto González; Colombia	48.16
Hammer throw	Enrique Samuells; Cuba	68.11 GR	Adolfo Martín; Cuba	56.59	Marcelino Borrero; Colombia	52.38
Javelin throw	Justo Perelló; Cuba	74.74 GR	Francisco Mena; Cuba	69.57	Jesús Rodríguez; Venezuela	68.59
Pentathlon	Jorge García; Puerto Rico	3513 GR	Francisco Mena; Cuba	3467	Ramón Iriarte; Venezuela	3389

=== Women's events ===
Event	Gold		Silver		Bronze	
100 metres	Miguelina Cobián; Cuba	11.7 /11.69?	Cristina Hechevarría; Cuba	11.9 /11.79?	Carmen Smith; Jamaica	11.9 /11.86?
200 metres	Una Morris; Jamaica	24.2 GR	Miguelina Cobián; Cuba	24.8	Vilma Charlton; Jamaica	24.9
80 metres hurdles	Carmen Smith; Jamaica	11.1	Doreldeen Pagan; Jamaica	11.6	Daisy Hechevarría; Cuba	11.6
4 × 100 metres relay	Jamaica; Adlin Mair; Una Morris; Vilma Charlton; Carmen Smith	46.2 GR	Cuba; Irene Martínez; Cristina Hechevarría; Fulgencia Romay; Miguelina Cobián	46.5	Barbados; Aledene Holder; Freida Nicholls; Arlene Babb; Patsy Callender	49.5
High jump	Patsy Callender; Barbados	1.65 GR	Hilda Fabré; Cuba	1.60	Julia Pérez; Cuba	1.55
Long jump	Irene Martínez; Cuba	5.87 GR	Beverley Welsh; Jamaica	5.72	Marcia Garbey; Cuba	5.47
Shot put	Hilda Ramírez; Cuba	12.72 GR	Guadalupe Lartigue; Mexico	12.23	Francisca Roberts; Venezuela	12.02
Discus throw	Caridad Agüero; Cuba	43.37	Joan Gordon; Jamaica	39.84	Carmen Romero; Cuba	39.07
Javelin throw	Hilda Ramírez; Cuba	39.34	Blanca Umaña; Colombia	37.39	María Moreno; Cuba	36.47

== Medal table ==
Rank	Nation	Gold	Silver	Bronze	Total
1	Cuba (CUB)	9	11	12	32
2	Jamaica (JAM)	7	5	4	16
3	Colombia (COL)	4	2	3	9
4	Puerto Rico (PUR)	4	2	1	7
5	Mexico (MEX)	3	3	4	10
6	Trinidad and Tobago (TTO)	2	5	1	8
7	Barbados (BAR)	1	1	1	3
8	Bahamas (BAH)	1	0	0	1
8	Guatemala (GUA)	1	0	0	1
10	Venezuela (VEN)	0	2	5	7
11	U.S. Virgin Islands (VIR)	0	1	1	2
Totals (11 entries)		32	32	32	96

== Participation ==
- Bahamas (4)
- Barbados (16)
- Colombia (19)
- Cuba (70)
- Dominican Republic (19)
- Guatemala (6)
- Guyana (1)
- Jamaica (30)
- Mexico (23)
- Netherlands Antilles (4)
- Nicaragua (2)
- Panama (5)
- Puerto Rico (76)
- El Salvador (8)
- Trinidad and Tobago (13)
- United States Virgin Islands (18)
- Venezuela (24)
