= Violetta Quesada =

Cuban sprinter (1947–2024)

Olympic medal record

Women's athletics
Silver medal – second place	1968 Mexico City	4 x 100 m relay

Violetta Quesada Díaz (11 July 1947 – 24 March 2024) was a Cuban sprinter who helped win a silver medal in 4 x 100 metres relay at the 1968 Summer Olympics, the first Olympic medal, ever achieved by Cuban women.

Quesada died in Tampa, Florida on 24 March 2024, at the age of 76.

== International competitions ==
Year	Competition	Venue	Position	Event	Notes
Representing Cuba
1967	Pan American Games	Winnipeg, Canada	7th	200 m	24.42
1967	Pan American Games	Winnipeg, Canada	1st	4 × 100 m relay	44.63
1967	Central American and Caribbean Championships	Xalapa, Mexico	2nd	200 m	24.4
1967	Central American and Caribbean Championships	Xalapa, Mexico	1st	4 × 100 m relay	45.1
1968	Olympic Games	Mexico City, Mexico	20th (qf)	100 m	11.6
1968	Olympic Games	Mexico City, Mexico	2nd	4 × 100 m relay	43.36
1969	Central American and Caribbean Championships	Havana, Cuba	2nd	200 m	23.8
1970	Central American and Caribbean Games	Panama City, Panama	2nd	200 m	23.9

== Personal bests ==
- 100 metres – 11.5h (1968)
- 200 metres – 23.6h (1968)

== Sources ==
Sports Reference
