= Tom Von Ruden =

American middle-distance runner

Tom von Ruden
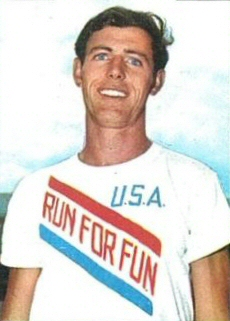
- Tom Von Ruden in 1969

Personal information
- Born: August 22, 1944 Coeur d'Alene, Idaho, U.S.
- Died: May 17, 2018 (aged 73)
Medal record
Men's Athletics
Representing the United States
Pan American Games
Gold medal – first place	1967 Winnipeg	1500 metres

Thomas Frederick Von Ruden (August 22, 1944 – May 17, 2018) was a middle distance runner from the United States. He is best known for winning the gold medal in the men's 1500 metres at the 1967 Pan American Games in Winnipeg, Manitoba, Canada. Von Ruden set his personal best (3:38.5) in the same event on 26 July 1971 at a meet in Århus. He also competed in the men's 1500 metres at the 1968 Summer Olympics.

Representing the Oklahoma State Cowboys track and field team, Von Ruden won the 1965 inaugural 880 yards at the NCAA Division I Indoor Track and Field Championships in a time of 1:51.8.

In, 1985 Von Ruden won the 1500 m at the United States Masters West Region Championship.
