= Roberto Silva (Portuguese footballer) =

Portuguese footballer

Personal information
- Full name: José Roberto Faria da Silva
- Date of birth: 22 September 1982 (age 44)
- Place of birth: Funchal, Portugal
- Height: 1.88 m (6 ft 2 in)
- Position: Centre-back

Senior career*
Years	Team	Apps	(Gls)
2001–2004	União da Madeira		
2004–2005	Câmara Lobos		
2005–2009	Santana		
2009–2015	União da Madeira	73	(1)
2015–2016	Santa Clara	20	(1)
2016–2018	Camacha	58	(4)
2018–2020	Pontassolense	35	(0)
- * Club domestic league appearances and goals

José Roberto Faria da Silva, known as Roberto Silva (born 22 September 1982) is a Portuguese former footballer who played as a centre-back.

== Career ==
Roberto Silva made his professional debut in the Segunda Liga for União da Madeira on 28 December 2011 in a game against Leixões.
