= Marcela Daniel =

Panamanian sprinter

Personal information
- Full name: Marcela Theresa Daniel
- Nationality: Panamanian
- Born: 10 August 1943 (age 82)
- Height: 1.57 m (5 ft 2 in)
- Weight: 52 kg (115 lb)

Sport
- Sport: Sprinting
- Event: 100 metres

Marcela Theresa Daniel (later Kitt; born 10 August 1943) is a Panamanian sprinter. She competed in the women's 100 metres at the 1964 Summer Olympics. She finished second in the 1959 Pan American Games 4 × 100 metres relay (with Carlota Gooden, Jean Holmes-Mitchell, and Silvia Hunte).

== International competitions ==
Year	Competition	Venue	Position	Event	Notes
Representing Panama
1959	Central American and Caribbean Games	Caracas, Venezuela	8th (h)	100 m	13.8
1959	Central American and Caribbean Games	Caracas, Venezuela	1st	4 × 100 m relay	50.51
1959	Pan American Games	Chicago, United States	10th (h)	60 m	8.0
1959	Pan American Games	Chicago, United States	10th (h)	100 m	12.8
1959	Pan American Games	Chicago, United States	2nd	4 × 100 m relay	48.2
1962	Central American and Caribbean Games	Kingston, Jamaica	2nd	100 m	12.12
1962	Central American and Caribbean Games	Kingston, Jamaica	3rd	4 × 100 m relay	47.7
1963	Pan American Games	São Paulo, Brazil	11th (h)	100 m	12.75
1963	Pan American Games	São Paulo, Brazil	4th	4 × 100 m relay	48.31
1964	Olympic Games	Tokyo, Japan	39th (h)	100 m	12.6
1964	Olympic Games	Tokyo, Japan	33rd (h)	200 m	26.6
1964	Olympic Games	Tokyo, Japan	12th (h)	4 × 100 m relay	47.6

== Personal bests ==
- 100 metres – 12.12 (1962)
