= Roberto Silva (athlete) =

Mexican middle-distance runner

Personal information
- Nationality: Mexican
- Born: 16 March 1947 (age 79)

Sport
- Sport: Middle-distance running
- Event: 800 metres

Roberto Silva Martínez (born 16 March 1947) is a Mexican middle-distance runner. He competed in the men's 800 metres at the 1968 Summer Olympics.
