= Miriam Siderenski =

Congolese-born Israeli Olympic runner

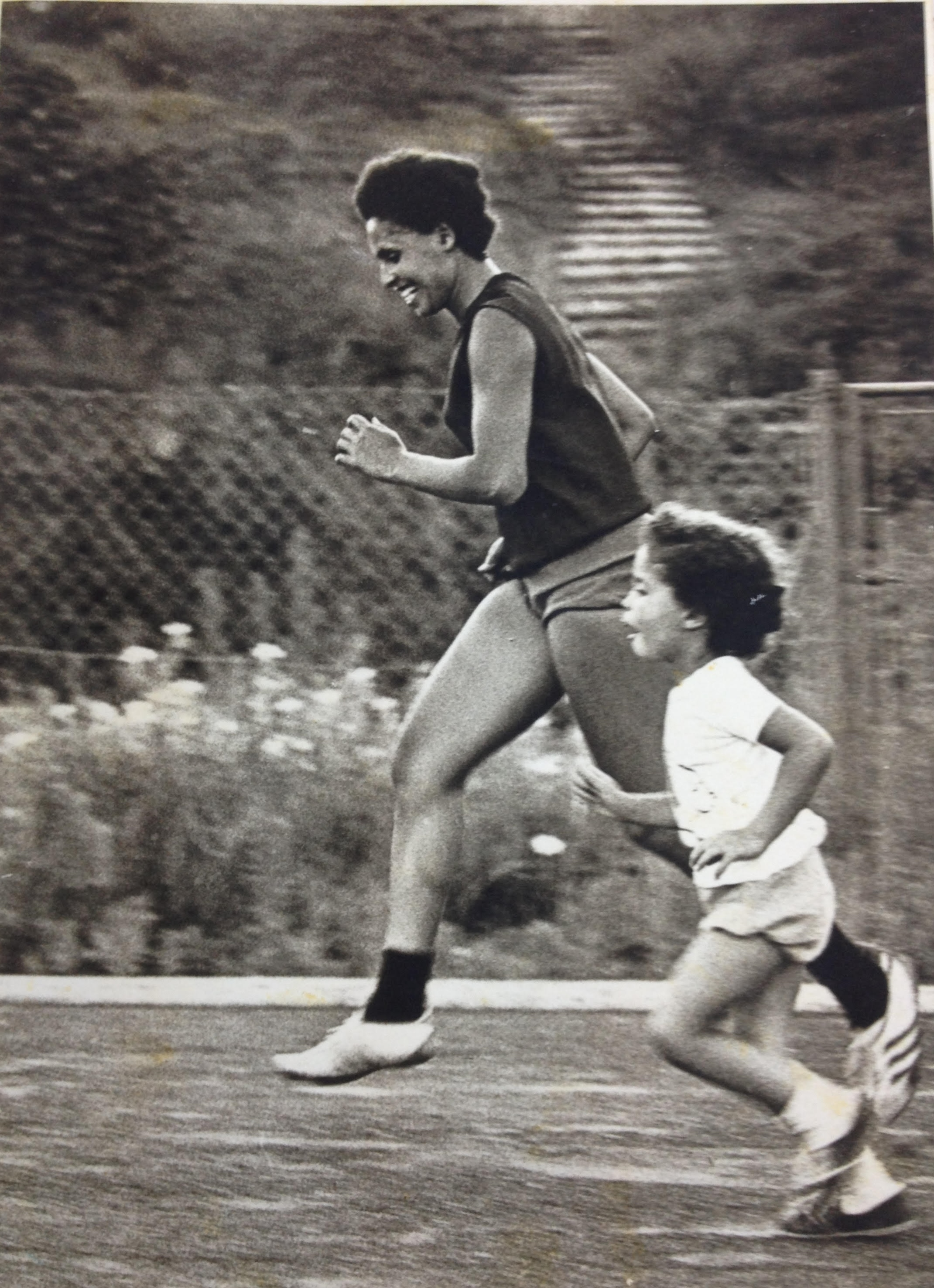
- Sidrenski running with her daughter

Personal information
- Native name: מרים סידרנסקי
- Nationality: Israel
- Born: 11 November 1941 (age 84) Belgian Congo
- Height: 5 ft 4.5 in (164 cm)
- Weight: 126 lb (57 kg)

Sport
- Country: Israel
- Sport: Athletics
- Events: 60 metres, 100 metres, 200 metres, 400 metres
- Coached by: Amitzur Shapira

Achievements and titles
- National finals: Israeli Champion in 60 metres (1962), 100 metres (1961-62, 1964–65), and 200 metres (1962, 1964–65).
- Personal bests: 100 m: 11.6 (1964); 200 m: 24.68 (1964)

Miriam Louise Marie Siderenski (also Miryam and Sidranski (-Catzenstein); Hebrew: מרים סידרנסקי; born 11 November 1941) is a Congolese-born Israeli former Olympic runner. She was the Israeli Champion in the 60 metres, 100 metres, and 200 metres.

She was born in Belgian Congo, and is of Jewish descent. Her father was born in Poland, and studied medicine in Belgium. She studied physical education at the Wingate Institute in Netanya, Israel. She married Yitzhak Katzenstein, has three children, and lives in Kfar Shmaryahu.

== Running career ==
Siderenski's personal bests were 11.6 in the 100 metres (1964) and 24.68 in the 200 metres (1964). She was the Israeli Champion in the 60 metres (1962), 100 metres (1961–62, 1964–65), and 200 metres (1962, 1964–65).

In July 1964 Siderenski ran the 100 metre dash in 12.0, and lowered her 400-metre record from 59.2 to 47.6. In October 1964 in a meet in France with some of Europe's best runners she won the women's 100-metre dash in 12.1.

Siderenski competed for Israel at the 1964 Summer Olympics in Tokyo, Japan, at the age of 22 in Athletics. In the Women's 100 metres she came in 6th in Heat 3, with a time of 12.1 (missing advancing by 0.1 seconds), and in the Women's 200 metres she came in 4th in Heat 4, with a time of 24.6 (setting a new Israeli record), finishing in 21st place. When she competed in the Olympics she was 5 ft 4.5 in (164 cm) tall and weighed 126 lb (57 kg).

Her coach was Amitzur Shapira, an Israeli sprinter and long jumper in the 1950s and a coach for the Israeli track and field team at the 1972 Summer Olympics in Munich, Germany, who was murdered by Palestinian terrorists in the Munich massacre.
