= José Pedraza (race walker) =

Mexican athlete

José Pedraza Zúñiga, nicknamed "El Sargento Pedraza" (September 19, 1937 – June 1, 1998) was a Mexican race walker and an army sergeant. He was the first Mexican athlete to win an Olympic medal in track and field. Since Pedraza, Mexico has won 9 additional Olympic medals in race walking alone. He was born in La Mojonera, Michoacán de Ocampo and died in Mexico City, Distrito Federal.

== Achievements ==
Year	Competition	Venue	Position	Event	Notes
Representing Mexico
1966	Central American and Caribbean Games	San Juan, Puerto Rico	1st	10,000 m	
1967	Pan American Games	Winnipeg, Canada	2nd	20 km	
1967	Central American and Caribbean Championships	Xalapa, Mexico	1st	20 km	
1968	Olympic Games	Mexico City, Mexico	2nd	20 km	
