= Joan Atkinson =

Northern Irish athlete

Personal information
- Nationality: British (Northern Irish)
- Born: Joan Helena Atkinson c.1943
- Education: Queen's University Belfast; Methodist College Belfast
- Children: Andrew J. Stewart

Sport
- Sport: Athletics
- Event: Sprints
- Club: Queen's University Belfast AC; Short and Harland AC
Medal record
Representing Great Britain
Summer Universiade
Silver medal – second place	1961 Sofia	200m
Bronze medal – third place	1961 Sofia	100m

Joan Helena Atkinson (born c.1943) is a former athlete from Northern Ireland, who represented Northern Ireland at the British Empire and Commonwealth Games.

== Education and early life ==
Atkinson attended Methodist College Belfast and was the 1959 Northern Ireland champion over both 110 yards and 220 yards.

Atkinson then studied at Queen's University Belfast.

== Career ==
Atkinson was a member of the Short and Harland Athletics Club in Belfast and held Irish records over both 100 and 220 yards in 1961. She was also the British Universities champion.

Initially listed as a reserve for the British Empire and Commonwealth Games, she was one of three athletes to be added to the Northern Irish team in September 1962. She subsequently competed at the 1962 British Empire and Commonwealth Games in Perth, Australia, participating in the 100 and 220 yards events.
