= Athletics at the 1963 Summer Universiade =

Athletics at the III Summer Universiade
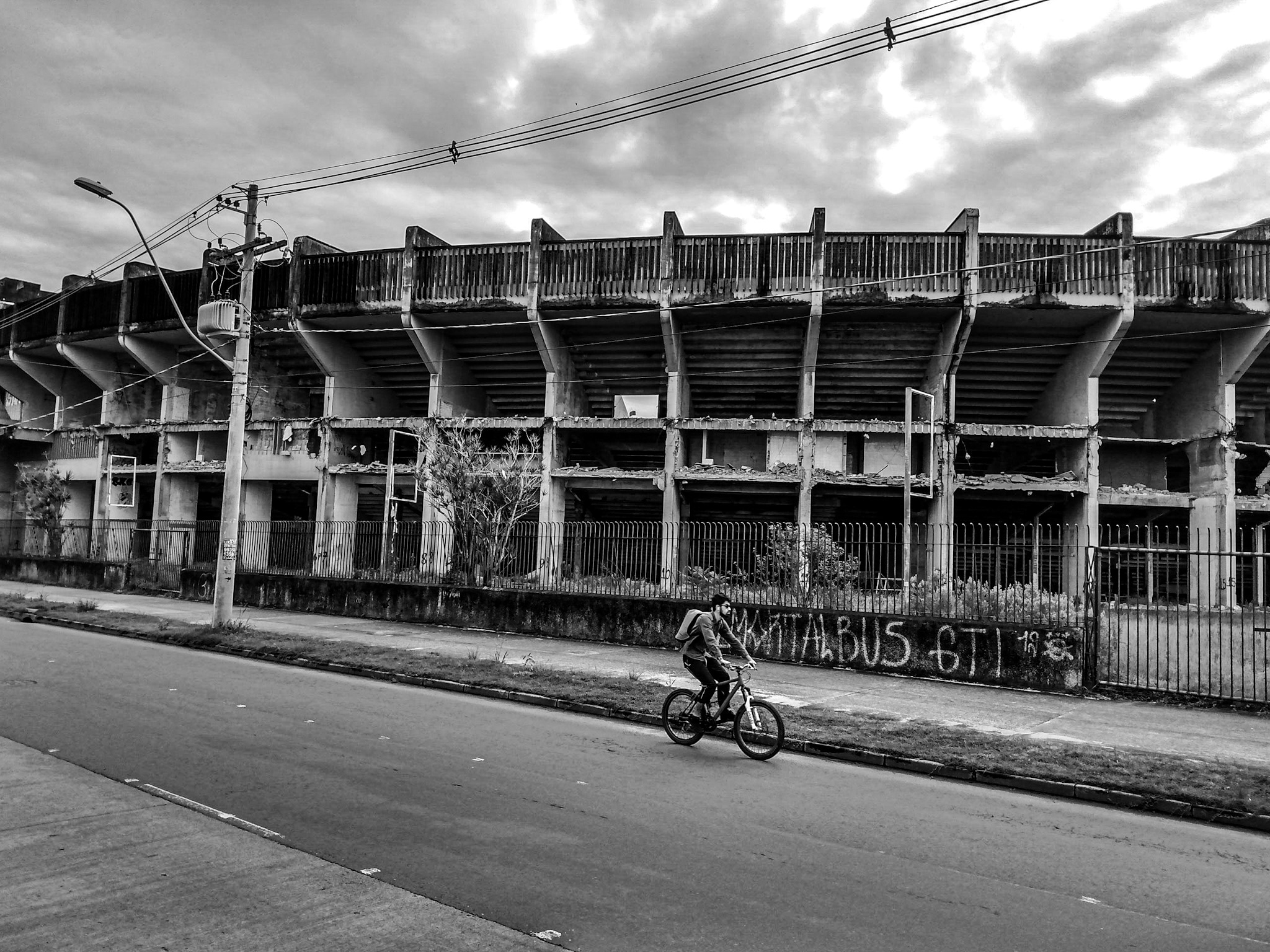
- The host stadium
- Dates: 5 – 8 September
- Host city: Porto Alegre, Brazil
- Venue: Estádio Olímpico Monumental
- Events: 29
- Participation: 21 nations

Athletics events were contested at the 1963 Summer Universiade in Porto Alegre, Brazil.

== Medal summary ==
=== Men ===
Event	Gold		Silver		Bronze	
100 metres	Enrique Figuerola (CUB)	10.34	Edvin Ozolin (URS)	10.52	Livio Berruti (ITA)	10.56
200 metres	Edvin Ozolin (URS)	21.44	Dick Steane (GBR)	21.55	Livio Berruti (ITA)	21.60
400 metres	Adrian Metcalfe (GBR)	46.75	Joachim Reske (FRG)	46.92	Jacques Pennewaert (BEL)	47.02
800 metres	Mamoru Morimoto (JPN)	1:48.1	John Boulter (GBR)	1:48.6	Norbert Haupert (LUX)	1:49.5
1500 metres	John Whetton (GBR)	3:49.5	Mamoru Morimoto (JPN)	3:49.6	Karl Eyerkaufer (FRG)	3:49.7
5000 metres	Leonid Ivanov (URS)	14:21.4	Béla Szekeres (HUN)	14:32.0	Ron Hill (GBR)	14:43.2
110 metres hurdles	Anatoly Mikhailov (URS)	14.17	Giorgio Mazza (ITA)	14.25	Mike Hogan (GBR)	14.40
400 metres hurdles	Roberto Frinolli (ITA)	50.48	Mike Hogan (GBR)	51.52	Salvatore Morale (ITA)	51.95
4 × 100 metres relay	Hungary (HUN); Csaba Csutorás; László Mihályfi; István Gyulai; Gyula Rábai	40.98	Cuba (CUB); Alejandro Pasqual; Manuel Montalvo; Lázaro Betancourt; Enrique Figuerola	41.37	France (FRA); Gérard Zingg; Jean-Pierre Fabre; Alain Roy; Alain Moreaux	41.82
4 × 400 metres relay	Great Britain (GRB); Adrian Metcalfe; John Boulter; Menzies Campbell; Dick Steane	3:12.02	West Germany (FRG); Peter Hoppe; Wolfgang Scholl; Johannes Schmitt; Hans-Joachim Reske	3:13.02	Italy (ITA); Sergio Bello; Marco Busatto; Mario Fraschini; Roberto Frinolli	3:13.65
High jump	Valeriy Brumel (URS)	2.15	Mauro Bogliatto (ITA)	2.09	Roberto Abugattás (PER)	1.99
Pole vault	Hennadiy Bleznitsov (URS)	4.60	Alain Moreaux (FRA)	4.30	Bernard Balastre (FRA)	4.20
Long jump	Igor Ter-Ovanesyan (URS)	7.95	Wolfgang Klein (FRG)	7.70	Carlos Díaz Martínez (CUB)	7.45
Triple jump	Satoshi Shimo (JPN)	15.99	Aleksandr Zolotarev (URS)	15.94	Luis Areta (ESP)	15.80
Shot put	Zsigmond Nagy (HUN)	18.44	Mike Lindsay (GBR)	17.76	Dietrich Urbach (FRG)	17.72
Discus throw	Gaetano Dalla Pria (ITA)	51.63	Mike Lindsay (GBR)	51.23	Dietrich Urbach (FRG)	51.03
Hammer throw	Gennadiy Kondrashov (URS)	65.76	Gyula Zsivótzky (HUN)	65.72	Masatoshi Wakabayashi (JPN)	60.90
Javelin throw	Jānis Lūsis (URS)	79.77	Hermann Salomon (FRG)	77.78	Gergely Kulcsár (HUN)	77.62
Decathlon	Manfred Pflugbeil (FRG)	6487	Gerd Lossdörfer (FRG)	6102	Marseno Martins (BRA)	

=== Women ===
Event	Gold		Silver		Bronze	
100 metres	Renāte Lāce (URS)	11.91	Vera Popkova (URS)	12.02	Miguelina Cobián (CUB)	12.11
200 metres	Jutta Heine (FRG)	24.60	Renāte Lāce (URS)	24.64	Miguelina Cobián (CUB)	24.74
800 metres	Olga Kazi (HUN)	2:05.9	Antje Gleichfeldt (FRG)	2:08.2	Joy Catling (GBR)	2:10.3
80 metres hurdles	Jutta Heine (FRG)	10.95	Tatyana Shchelkanova (URS)	11.01	Alla Chernisheva (URS)	11.10
4 × 100 metres relay	Soviet Union (URS); Alla Chernyshova; Renāte Lāce; Vera Popkova; Tatyana Shchelkanova	46.5	West Germany (FRG); Bärbel Palmi; Antje Gleichfeld; Elke Masnfeld; Jutta Heine	47.5	Cuba (CUB); Irene Martínez; Fulgencia Romay; Norma Pérez; Miguelina Cobián	47.5
High jump	Taisiya Chenchik (URS)	1.72	Susan Dennler (GBR)	1.67	Heidemarie Hummel (FRG)	1.65
Long jump	Tatyana Shchelkanova (URS)	6.48	Vlasta Přikrylová (TCH)	5.71	Bärbel Palmié (FRG)	5.63
Shot put	Tamara Press (URS)	17.29	Judit Bognár (HUN)	15.47	Jolán Kleiber-Kontsek (HUN)	14.75
Discus throw	Tamara Press (URS)	55.90	Jolán Kleiber-Kontsek (HUN)	50.92	Judit Bognár (HUN)	49.73
Javelin throw	Almut Brömmel (FRG)	49.61	Elvīra Ozoliņa (URS)	47.00	Barbara Decker (FRG)	43.91

== Medal table ==
Rank	Nation	Gold	Silver	Bronze	Total
1	Soviet Union (URS)	14	6	1	21
2	West Germany (FRG)	4	7	6	17
3	Great Britain (GBR)	3	6	3	12
4	Hungary (HUN)	3	4	3	10
5	Italy (ITA)	2	2	4	8
6	Japan (JPN)	2	1	1	4
7	Cuba (CUB)	1	2	4	7
8	France (FRA)	0	1	2	3
9	Belgium (BEL)	0	0	1	1
9	Brazil (BRA)	0	0	1	1
9	Luxembourg (LUX)	0	0	1	1
9	Peru (PER)	0	0	1	1
9	Spain (ESP)	0	0	1	1
Totals (13 entries)		29	29	29	87

== See also ==
- FISU World University Games
- University and college sport
