= Euclides Calzado =

Cuban racewalker

Personal information
- Nationality: Cuban
- Born: 5 April 1944 (age 82)

Sport
- Sport: Athletics
- Event: Racewalking

Euclides Calzado Carbonell (born 5 April 1944) is a Cuban racewalker. He competed in the men's 20 kilometres walk at the 1968 Summer Olympics.
