= Renāte Lāce =

Latvian sprinter and long jumper

Personal information
- Nationality: Latvian
- Born: 18 February 1943 Rīga, Reichskommissariat Ostland
- Died: 3 March 1967 (aged 24) Rīga, Latvian SSR, Soviet Union
- Height: 1.74 m (5 ft 9 in)
- Weight: 65 kg (143 lb)

Sport
- Country: Soviet Union
- Sport: Track and field
- Coached by: Ira Ozola
Medal record
Women's athletics
Representing Soviet Union
European Championships
Bronze medal – third place	1966 Budapest	4×100 m
Summer Universiade
Gold medal – first place	1963 Porto Alegre	100 m
Gold medal – first place	1965 Budapest	4×100 m
Gold medal – first place	1963 Porto Alegre	4×100 m
Silver medal – second place	1963 Porto Alegre	200 m

Renāte Lāce (18 February 1943 – 3 March 1967) was a Latvian track and field athlete. At the 1963 Summer Universiade, she won the gold medal in the 100 metres event and the silver medal in the 200 metres. She won a bronze medal with the Soviet 4 x 100 metres team at the 1966 European Championships. Lāce competed at the 1964 Summer Olympics and finished in fourth place in the 4 x 100 metres relay.
