= Norma Harris =

American sprinter

Personal information
- Nationality: American
- Born: 22 April 1947 (age 79)

Sport
- Country: United States
- Sport: Athletics
Medal record
Athletics
Representing United States
Pan American Games
Gold medal – first place	1963 São Paulo	4 × 100 m relay

Norma Harris (born 22 April 1947) is a former American female sprinter.

Norma Harris claimed a gold medal in the women's 4 × 100 m relay event during the 1963 Pan American Games.
