= Vivian Brown (sprinter) =

American sprinter (1941–1998)

Personal information
- Born: December 17, 1941 Detroit, Michigan, United States
- Died: August 20, 1998 (aged 56) Cleveland, Ohio, United States

Sport
- Sport: Sprinting
- Event: 200 metres

Vivian Brown (December 17, 1941 – August 20, 1998) was an American sprinter. She competed in the women's 200 metres at the 1964 Summer Olympics and secured first place in the women's 200 meters at the 1963 Pan American Games.
