= Edith McGuire =

American sprinter

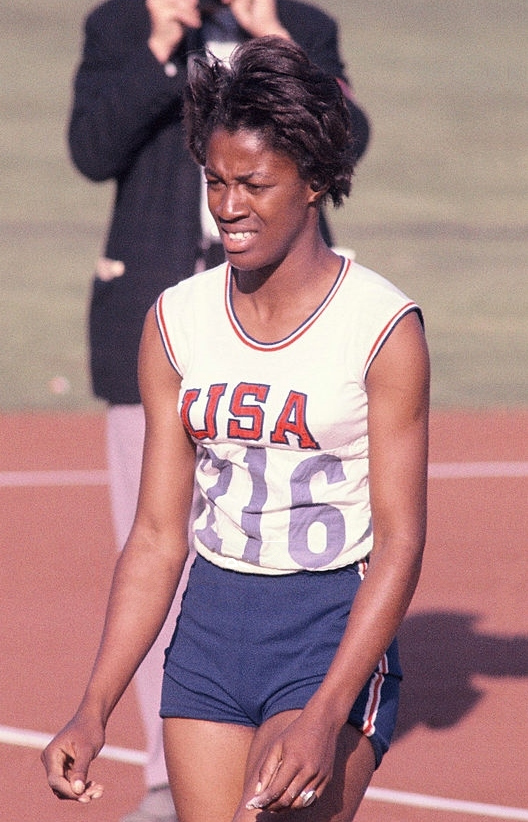
- McGuire at the 1964 Olympics

Personal information
- Full name: Edith Marie McGuire
- Born: June 3, 1944 (age 82) Atlanta, Georgia, U.S.
- Height: 5 ft 8 in (1.73 m)
- Weight: 130 lb (59 kg)

Sport
- Sport: Athletics
- Event(s): Sprint, long jump
- Club: TSU Tigers, Nashville

Achievements and titles
- Personal best(s): 100 m – 11.47 (1964); 200 m – 23.05 (1964); LJ – 5.91 m (1961)
Medal record
Women's athletics
Representing the United States
Olympic Games
Gold medal – first place	1964 Tokyo	200 m
Silver medal – second place	1964 Tokyo	100 m
Silver medal – second place	1964 Tokyo	4 × 100 m relay
Pan American Games
Gold medal – first place	1963 São Paulo	100 m
Bronze medal – third place	1963 São Paulo	Long jump

Edith Marie McGuire (born June 3, 1944), later known as Edith McGuire Duvall, is an American former sprinter.

Born in Atlanta, Georgia, McGuire ran for Tennessee State University. TSU had a very successful women's sprinting team, The Tigerbelles, in the 1960s, including triple Olympic champions Wilma Rudolph, Wyomia Tyus, and McGuire.

Although McGuire's running career was short, she won six AAU titles, in three different events. Her specialty, however, was the 200 m/220 y, in which she won four of her six national titles. In 1964, she was undefeated in her favorite event, and went to Tokyo as the main contender for the 200 m gold medal at the 1964 Summer Olympics.

McGuire first competed in the 100 m in Japan, and lost out in the final to teammate Tyus. But in the 200 m final, she held off Poland's Irena Kirszenstein to take the gold medal. She added a third medal to her tally as a member of the American 4 × 100 m relay team, which placed second to Poland.

Edith McGuire ended her athletics career in 1965, and became a teacher. In 1980 she was inducted into the Georgia Sports Hall of Fame. At present, she owns a number of fast food restaurants in Oakland, California together with her husband Charles Duvall.
