= Irene Piotrowski =

Canadian sprinter (1941–2020)

Medal record

Women's sthletics

Representing Canada

British Empire and Commonwealth Games
Silver medal – second place	1966 Kingston	110 yards
Bronze medal – third place	1966 Kingston	220 yards

Pan American Games
Silver medal – second place	1967 Winnipeg	4 x 100 m relay
Bronze medal – third place	1967 Winnipeg	100 metres

Irene Piotrowski, (née Macijauskaitė; July 9, 1941 – August 13, 2020) was a Canadian female track and field athlete, born in Skaudvilė, Lithuania. In 1964, Piotrowski broke the World and Canadian 100 metre record at 11.4 seconds. She competed in the 1964 Olympic Games in the 100 metre and 200 metre. She won a silver medal in the 100 yards and a bronze in the 220 yard sprints at the 1966 British Empire and Commonwealth Games in Kingston, Jamaica. She competed in the 1968 Summer Olympics in Mexico City, in the 200 metres, 4x100 metre relay and the 100 metre where she set the Canadian records. She claimed the bronze medal in the women's 100 metres at the 1967 Pan American Games in Winnipeg, Manitoba, Canada, and ran the anchor leg on the 4 x 100 metre relay squad that took the silver medal. She won the Yukon Flour Packing title in 1974, backpacking 500 pounds in 100 feet, and 600 pounds in 50 ft. She died in 2020 in Los Angeles, California at the age of 79.
