= Athletics at the 1967 Pan American Games =

- Dates: 29 July – 5 August
- Host city: Winnipeg, Manitoba, Canada
- Venue: Pan American Stadium
- Level: Senior
- Events: 35
- Participation: 293 athletes from 33 nations

The athletics competition at the 1967 Pan American Games was held at Pan American Stadium in Winnipeg, Manitoba, Canada.

== Medal summary ==
=== Men's events ===
Event	Gold		Silver		Bronze	
100 metres (wind: +3.1 m/s)	Harry Jerome; Canada	10.27w	Willie Turner; United States	10.27w	Hermes Ramírez; Cuba	10.36w
200 metres	John Carlos; United States	20.5	Jerry Bright; United States	20.9	Pablo Montes; Cuba	21.0
400 metres	Lee Evans; United States	44.95	Vince Matthews; United States	45.13	Don Domansky; Canada	45.80
800 metres	Wade Bell; United States	1:49.20	Bill Crothers; Canada	1:49.91	Brian MacLaren; Canada	1:50.31
1500 metres	Tom Von Ruden; United States	3:43.41	Sam Bair; United States	3:44.17	Dave Bailey; Canada	3:44.93
5000 metres	Van Nelson; United States	13:47.4	Lou Scott; United States	13:54.0	Juan Martínez; Mexico	13:54.0
10,000 metres	Van Nelson; United States	29:17.40	Dave Ellis; Canada	29:18.40	Tom Laris; United States	29:21.60
Marathon	Andy Boychuk; Canada	2:23:03	Agustín Calle; Colombia	2:25:51	Alfredo Peñaloza; Mexico	2:27:49
110 metres hurdles (wind: +1.3 m/s m/s)	Earl McCullouch; United States	13.49	Willie Davenport; United States	13.55	Juan Morales; Cuba	14.30
400 metres hurdles	Ron Whitney; United States	50.75	Russ Rogers; United States	51.31	Bob McLaren; Canada	51.44
3000 metres steeplechase	Chris McCubbins; United States	8:38.2	Conrad Nightingale; United States	8:51.2	Domingo Amaizón; Argentina	8:55.0
4 × 100 metres relay	United States; Earl McCullouch; Jerry Bright; Ron Copeland; Willie Turner	39.05	Cuba; Félix Eugellés; Juan Morales; Hermes Ramírez; Pablo Montes	39.26	Colombia; Jaime Uribe; Hernando Arrechea; Carlos Álvarez; Pedro Grajales	39.92
4 × 400 metres relay	United States; Elbert Stinson; Emmett Taylor; Vince Matthews; Lee Evans	3:02.03	Canada; Brian MacLaren; Ross MacKenzie; Bob McLaren; Bill Crothers	3:04.83	Jamaica; Neville Myton; Michael Fray; Alex McDonald; Clifton Forbes	3:05.99
20 kilometres walk	Ron Laird; United States	1:33:06	José Pedraza; Mexico	1:34:51	Felix Cappella; Canada	1:35:45
50 kilometres walk	Larry Young; United States	4:26:21	Felix Cappella; Canada	4:36:00	Goetz Klopfer; United States	4:38:00
High jump	Ed Caruthers; United States	2.19	Otis Burrell; United States	2.16	Roberto Abugattás; Peru	2.05
Pole vault	Bob Seagren; United States	4.90	Bob Raftis; Canada	4.75	Bob Yard; Canada	4.45
Long jump	Ralph Boston; United States	8.29	Bob Beamon; United States	8.07	Wellesley Clayton; Jamaica	7.76
Triple jump	Charles Craig; United States	16.54	Nelson Prudêncio; Brazil	16.45	José Hernández; Cuba	15.95
Shot put	Randy Matson; United States	19.83	Neal Steinhauer; United States	19.45	Dave Steen; Canada	18.51
Discus throw	Gary Carlsen; United States	57.50	Rink Babka; United States	56.88	George Puce; Canada	56.20
Hammer throw	Tom Gage; United States	65.32	Enrique Samuells; Cuba	64.66	George Frenn; United States	64.08
Javelin throw	Frank Covelli; United States	74.28	Gary Stenlund; United States	74.28	Justo Perelló; Cuba	71.96
Decathlon	Bill Toomey; United States	8044	Héctor Thomas; Venezuela	7312	Dave Thoreson; United States	7295

=== Women's events ===
Event	Gold		Silver		Bronze	
100 metres (wind: +0.1 m/s)	Barbara Ferrell; United States	11.59	Miguelina Cobián; Cuba	11.69	Irene Piotrowski; Canada	11.78
200 metres (wind: +4.1 m/s)	Wyomia Tyus; United States	23.78w	Barbara Ferrell; United States	23.83w	Miguelina Cobián; Cuba	23.89w
800 metres	Madeline Manning; United States	2:02.35	Doris Brown; United States	2:02.95	Abby Hoffman; Canada	2:04.82
80 metres hurdles (wind: +1.8 m/s)	Cherrie Sherrard; United States	10.83	Mamie Rallins; United States	10.85	Thora Best; Trinidad and Tobago	10.98
4 × 100 metres relay	Cuba; Marcia Garbey; Cristina Echeverría; Violetta Quesada; Miguelina Cobián	44.63	Canada; Judy Dallimore; Arleen McLaughlin; Jenny Meldrum; Irene Piotrowski	45.56	Jamaica; Carol Cummings; Una Morris; Audrey Reid; Vilma Charlton	47.17
High jump	Eleanor Montgomery; United States	1.78	Susan Nigh; Canada	1.72	Franzetta Parham; United States	1.69
Long jump	Irene Martínez; Cuba	6.33	Gisela Vidal; Venezuela	6.20	Willye White; United States	6.17
Shot put	Nancy McCredie; Canada	15.18	Lynn Graham; United States	14.88	Maureen Dowds; Canada	14.35
Discus throw	Carol Moseke; United States	49.24	Carol Martin; Canada	47.94	Caridad Agüero; Cuba	46.68
Javelin throw	Barbara Friedrich; United States	53.26	RaNae Bair; United States	51.64	Jay Dahlgren; Canada	45.46
Pentathlon	Pat Winslow; United States	4860	Jenny Meldrum; Canada	4724	Aída dos Santos; Brazil	4531

== Medal table ==
Rank	Nation	Gold	Silver	Bronze	Total
1	United States (USA)	30	18	6	54
2	Canada (CAN)	3	9	12	24
3	Cuba (CUB)	2	3	7	12
4	Venezuela (VEN)	0	2	0	2
5	Mexico (MEX)	0	1	2	3
6	Brazil (BRA)	0	1	1	2
6	Colombia (COL)	0	1	1	2
8	Jamaica (JAM)	0	0	3	3
9	Argentina (ARG)	0	0	1	1
9	Peru (PER)	0	0	1	1
9	Trinidad and Tobago (TTO)	0	0	1	1
Totals (11 entries)		35	35	35	105

== Participating nations ==
- Argentina (18)
- Bahamas (7)
- Barbados (1)
- Bolivia (2)
- Brazil (6)
- Canada (58)
- Chile (8)
- Colombia (14)
- Costa Rica (1)
- Cuba (26)
- Ecuador (5)
- Guatemala (3)
- Guyana (1)
- Jamaica (16)
- Mexico (26)
- Nicaragua (1)
- Peru (11)
- Puerto Rico (8)
- Trinidad and Tobago (9)
- United States (66)
- Uruguay (1)
- Venezuela (3)
- Virgin Islands (2)
