= 1966 Central American and Caribbean Games =

Sports events held in San Juan, Puerto Rico

Central American and Caribbean Games
- Host city: San Juan
- Country: Puerto Rico
- Edition: 10th
- Nations: 18
- Athletes: 1,689
- Opening: 11 June 1966
- Closing: 25 June 1966
- Opened by: Roberto Sánchez Vilella
- Athlete's Oath: Fernando Báez
- Torch lighter: Teófilo Colón
- Main venue: Hiram Bithorn Stadium

The tenth Central American and Caribbean Games were held in San Juan, Puerto Rico, from June 11 to June 25, 1966. These games were one of the largest ever with a total number of 1,689 athletes from eighteen participating nations.

== Organizing Committee ==
Among those that composed the organizing committee were; Emilio Huyke, President, Joaquín Martinez Rousset, General Secretary, Felicio Torregrosa, Technical Director, German Rieckhoff Sampayo, Legal Council, Jose Luis Purcell, Emilio Vergne, Rafael Aparicio, Luis Crespo, Juan Maldonado, Rafael Pont Flores, Norman H. Davila and others.

== Sports ==
- Athletics ()
- Baseball ()
- Boxing ()
- Cycling ()
- Diving ()
- Fencing ()
- Football ()
- Judo ()
- Sailing ()
- Shooting ()
- Swimming ()
- Tennis ()
- Volleyball ()
- Water polo ()
- Weightlifting ()
- Wrestling ()

== Medal table ==
* Host nation (Puerto Rico)

1966 Central American and Caribbean Games medal table
Rank	Nation	Gold	Silver	Bronze	Total
1	Mexico	38	23	22	83
2	Cuba	35	19	24	78
3	Puerto Rico*	27	27	29	83
4	Venezuela	10	23	21	54
5	Colombia	10	12	12	34
6	Jamaica	7	7	8	22
7	Trinidad and Tobago	7	7	4	18
8	Panama	1	4	4	9
9	Guatemala	1	2	3	6
10	Barbados	1	1	2	4
11	Bahamas	1	0	0	1
12	Netherlands Antilles	0	5	1	6
13	Virgin Islands	0	4	1	5
14	Dominican Republic	0	1	2	3
15	Guyana	0	1	1	2
16	Nicaragua	0	1	0	1
17	El Salvador	0	0	2	2
Totals (17 entries)		138	137	136	411
