= Wyomia Tyus =

American sprinter

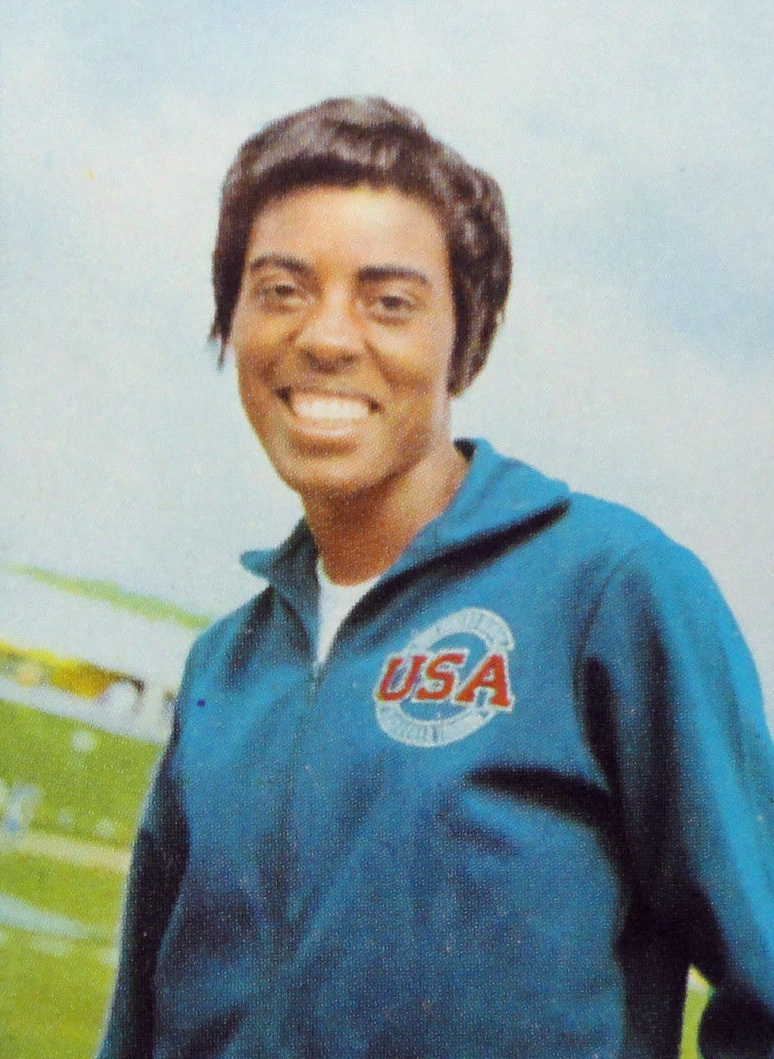
- Tyus in 1968

Personal information
- Born: August 29, 1945 (age 80) Griffin, Georgia, United States
- Height: 1.72 m (5 ft 8 in)
- Weight: 61 kg (134 lb)

Sport
- Sport: Athletics
- Event(s): 100 m, 200 m
- Club: TSU Tigers, Nashville

Achievements and titles
- Personal best(s): 100 yd – 10.3 (1965); 100 m – 11.08 (1968); 200 m – 23.08 (1968)
Medal record
Representing the United States
Olympic Games
| Gold medal – first place | 1964 Tokyo | 100 m |
| Gold medal – first place | 1968 Mexico City | 100 m |
| Gold medal – first place | 1968 Mexico City | 4 × 100 m relay |
| Silver medal – second place | 1964 Tokyo | 4 × 100 m relay |
Pan American Games
| Gold medal – first place | 1967 Winnipeg | 200 m |

Official Olympic Video on YouTube

Wyomia Tyus (pronunciation: why-o-mi; born August 29, 1945) is a retired American track and field sprinter, and the first person to retain the Olympic title in the 100 m (a feat since duplicated by Carl Lewis, Gail Devers, Shelly-Ann Fraser-Pryce, Usain Bolt, and Elaine Thompson-Herah).

== Early life ==
Raised on a dairy farm, as the youngest of four children, and the only girl in the family Tyus was encouraged by her father to participate in sports. While a high school athlete Tyus participated in basketball and began her track endeavors as a high jumper before transitioning to the sprints after being invited to a summer track clinic at Tennessee State University in 1960. It was in this same year that Tyus's father died leaving the job of male role model in Tyus's life to her soon to be track coach at Tennessee State Ed Temple.

== College and professional career ==
Tyus, from Tennessee State University, participated in the 1964 Summer Olympics at age 19. In the heats of the event, she equaled Wilma Rudolph's world record, propelling her to a favored position for the final, where her main rival was fellow American Edith McGuire. Tyus won the final, beating McGuire by 0.2 seconds. At the same Olympics, she also won a silver medal with the 4 × 100 m relay team.

The following years, Tyus won numerous national championships in the sprint events, and a gold medal in the 200 m at the Pan-American Games. In 1968, she returned to the Olympics to defend her title in the 100 m. In the final, she set a new world record of 11.08 s to become the first person, male or female, to retain the Olympic 100 metres title. Tyus also qualified for the 200 m final, in which she finished sixth. Running the final leg for the relay team, Tyus helped setting a new world record, winning her third gold medal.

Director Bud Greenspan filmed Tyus casually dancing behind her starting blocks before the Olympic final. When interviewed later she said she was doing the "Tighten Up" to stay loose.

Tyus retired from international sports after the 1968 Olympics. In 1973, she was invited to compete in the 60-yard dash in the new International Track Association competitions. In her first-year return, she won eight of eighteen events. The following year, she won every event she entered, a total of twenty-two races. Tyus continued to compete in the 60 yard dash up until 1982.

== Post athletics ==
Tyus went on to coach at Beverly Hills High School, and was a founding member of the Women's Sports Foundation.

In August 1980, Tyus appeared with four of her cousins on Family Feud, and in two days (August 1–4) they won $5,367. In 1976, Tyus was inducted into the Georgia Sports Hall of Fame. In 1980, Tyus was inducted into the National Track and Field Hall of Fame. At the 1984 Summer Olympics, she was one of eleven athletes who carried in the Olympic Flag during the Opening Ceremony. In 1985, she was inducted into the U.S. Olympic Hall of Fame.

In 1999, her hometown of Griffin, Georgia honored her with the unveiling of the Wyomia Tyus Olympic Park. The 2010 Breeder's World Cup featured a two-year-old filly racing horse bearing her namesake. In 2018, she published the memoir Tigerbelle : the Wyomia Tyus story, with co-author Elizabeth Terzakis; it is part of Dave Zirin's Edge of Sports series.

== Personal life ==
Tyus grew up in a primarily white neighborhood and became aware of her race and of racial segregation at an early age. She was forced to take an hour bus ride to school each day, in spite of the fact that there was a white school within walking distance. Racial divide in her neighborhood also prevented Tyus from playing with the white girls that lived nearby and as the nearest black family lived almost a mile away, Tyus spent most of her time playing sports with her brothers and the white boys in the neighborhood. As she grew older her father helped to solidify the idea that she could accomplish anything in her life, but not without hard work to overcome racial stigma.

After finishing high school Tyus attended Tennessee State University (TSU), making her the first of her family to go to college. While at TSU Tyus participated in the Tigerbelles collegiate team. Tyus began training with TSU coach Ed Temple, but poor grades, study habits, and a general lack of interest in classes nearly derailed Tyus's chances to continue her training and attend the 1964 Olympics. She has credited her training with Coach Temple as helping with her development and success in sporting, academic, and professional life, especially as he highlighted the struggle that comes with being a black athlete and having to work harder to receive positive recognition.

In December 1968, Tyus moved with her then boyfriend from Georgia to California, where she worked as a substitute teacher. She married her boyfriend Art Simburg in 1969 and held multiple jobs until becoming a teacher in 1971. Tyus left this job within a year in order to stay at home with her first child. Tyus's first marriage ended in 1974 and in 1978 she married Duane Tillman, with whom she had her second child, a son.
