= 1966 USA Outdoor Track and Field Championships =

- Dates: June 25–26
- Host city: New York City, New York; Frederick, Maryland; United States
- Venue: Downing Stadium, Randalls Island

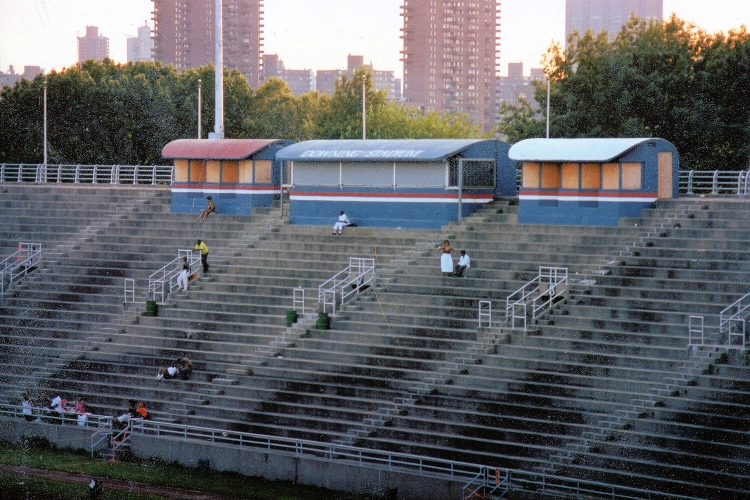
Downing Stadium

The 1966 USA Outdoor Track and Field Championships men's competition took place between June 25–26 at Downing Stadium on Randalls Island in New York City. The women's division held their championships separately in Frederick, Maryland. Both venues were dirt tracks.

The Marathon championships were run in October at the Yonkers Marathon for the final time after being designated the National Championships 18 times in succession.

Jim Ryun was the star of the show, running the first four minute mile in the northeastern United States.

== Results ==
=== Men track events ===
Event	Gold		Silver		Bronze	
100 yards	Charles Greene	9.4	Jim Hines	9.4	Harold Busby	9.5
220 yards	Jim Hines	20.5w	Adolph Plummer	20.5w	Tom Jones	20.6w
440 yards	Lee Evans	45.9	Theron Lewis	46.2	Robert Frey	46.3
880 yards	Thomas Farrell	1.47.6	Ted Nelson	1.48.0	David Patrick	1.48.8
1 Mile	Jim Ryun	3.58.6	Dyrol Burleson	4.00.0	Jim Grelle	4.00.6
3 miles	George Young	13.27.4	Tracy Smith	13.27.4	Tom Laris	13.28.4
6 miles	Tracy Smith	28.02.0	Billy Mills	28.34.2	Dave Ellis Canada; John Lawson	28.52.6; 29.06.4
Marathon	Norman Higgins	2.22.50.8	Robert Scharff	2.26.14.0	Louis Castagnola	2.28.47.0
120 yard hurdles	Willie Davenport	13.44	Don Shy	13.61	Earl McCullouch	13.88
440 y hurdles	Jim Miller	50.26	Geoff Vanderstock	50.30	Bob Steele	50.44
3000 meters steeplechase	Pat Traynor	8.40.6 CRm	Ray Barrus	8.43.4	Michael Manley	8.47.6
2 miles walk	Ron Laird	13:52.7	Don DeNoon	14:07.7	Ron Daniel	14:29.8

=== Men field events ===
Event	Gold		Silver		Bronze	
High jump	Otis Burrell	2.18 m (7 ft 1 3/4 in) =CR	John Hartfield	2.18 m (7 ft 1 3/4 in) =CR	Stan Albright	2.16 m (7 ft 1 in)
Pole vault	Bob Seagren	5.18 m (16 ft 11 3/4 in) =CR	Paul Wilson	5.08 m (16 ft 8 in)	John Pennel	5.08 m (16 ft 8 in)
Long jump	Ralph Boston	8.01 m (26 ft 3 1/4 in)	Charlie Mays	8.01 m (26 ft 3 1/4 in)	Darrell Horn	7.86 m (25 ft 9 1/4 in)
Triple jump	Art Walker	16.36 m (53 ft 8 in) CR	Darrell Horn	15.54 m (50 ft 11 3/4 in)	Charlie Craig	15.35 m (50 ft 4 1/4 in)
Shot put	Randy Matson	19.56 m (64 ft 2 in)	Neal Steinhauer	19.52 m (64 ft 1/2 in)	Parry O'Brien	18.93 m (62 ft 1 1/4 in)
Discus Throw	Alfred Oerter	59.05 m (193 ft 8 in)	Rink Babka	58.27 m (191 ft 2 in)	Randy Matson	58.14 m (190 ft 8 in)
Hammer throw	Ed Burke	67.05 m (219 ft 11 in)	Hal Connolly	66.67 m (218 ft 8 in)	Tom Gage	65.58 m (215 ft 1 in)
Javelin throw	John Tushaus	79.45 m (260 ft 7 in)	Ed Red	78.31 m (256 ft 11 in)	Jim Stevenson	75.89 m (248 ft 11 in)
Pentathlon	Jeff Bannister	3512 pts				
All-around decathlon	Brian Murphy	7541 pts				
Decathlon	Bill Toomey	8234 WR*	Russ Hodge	8130	Dave Thoreson	7520

- Toomey's world record, a 4 point improvement over Hodge's existing record, was never ratified

=== Women track events ===
Event	Gold		Silver		Bronze	
100 yards	Wyomia Tyus	10.5	Edith McGuire	10.8	Barbara Ferrell	10.9
220 yards	Wyomia Tyus	23.8	Barbara Ferrell	23.9	Edith McGuire	24.0
400 meters	Charlette Cooke	53.4	Dolores Stoneback	55.7	Chris Iverson	55.7
800 meters	Charlette Cooke	2.05.0	Madeline Manning	2.06.2	Frances Kraker	2.10.9
1500 meters	Doris Brown Heritage	4.20.2	Marie Mudler	4.36.6	Frances Kraker	4.37.3
80 meters hurdles	Cherrie Sherrard	10.7	Mamie Rallins	11.0	Tammy Davis	11.1

=== Women field events ===
Event	Gold		Silver		Bronze	
High jump	Eleanor Montgomery	1.70 m (5 ft 6 3/4 in)	Estelle Baskerville	1.65 m (5 ft 4 3/4 in)	Patricia Clark	1.62 m (5 ft 3 3/4 in)
Long jump	Willye White	6.28 m (20 ft 7 in)	Martha Watson	6.02 m (19 ft 9 in)	Beth McBride	5.83 m (19 ft 1 1/2 in)
Shot put	Lynn Graham	14.62 m (47 ft 11 1/2 in)	Carol Moseke	13.54 m (44 ft 5 in)	Maren Seidler	13.26 m (43 ft 6 in)
Discus Throw	Carol Moseke	48.66 m (159 ft 7 in)	Cynthia Wyatt	44.35 m (145 ft 6 in)	Nancy Norberg	43.81 m (143 ft 8 in)
Javelin throw	RaNae Bair	53.29 m (174 ft 10 in)	Barbara Friedrich	53.11 m (174 ft 2 in)	Louise Gerrish	48.59 m (159 ft 4 in)
Pentathlon	Pat Daniels	4496	Denise Paschal	4384	Cherrie Sherrard	4366

== See also ==
- United States Olympic Trials (track and field)
