= 1965 USA Outdoor Track and Field Championships =

- Dates: June 25–26
- Host city: San Diego, California; Columbus, Ohio; United States
- Venue: Balboa Stadium

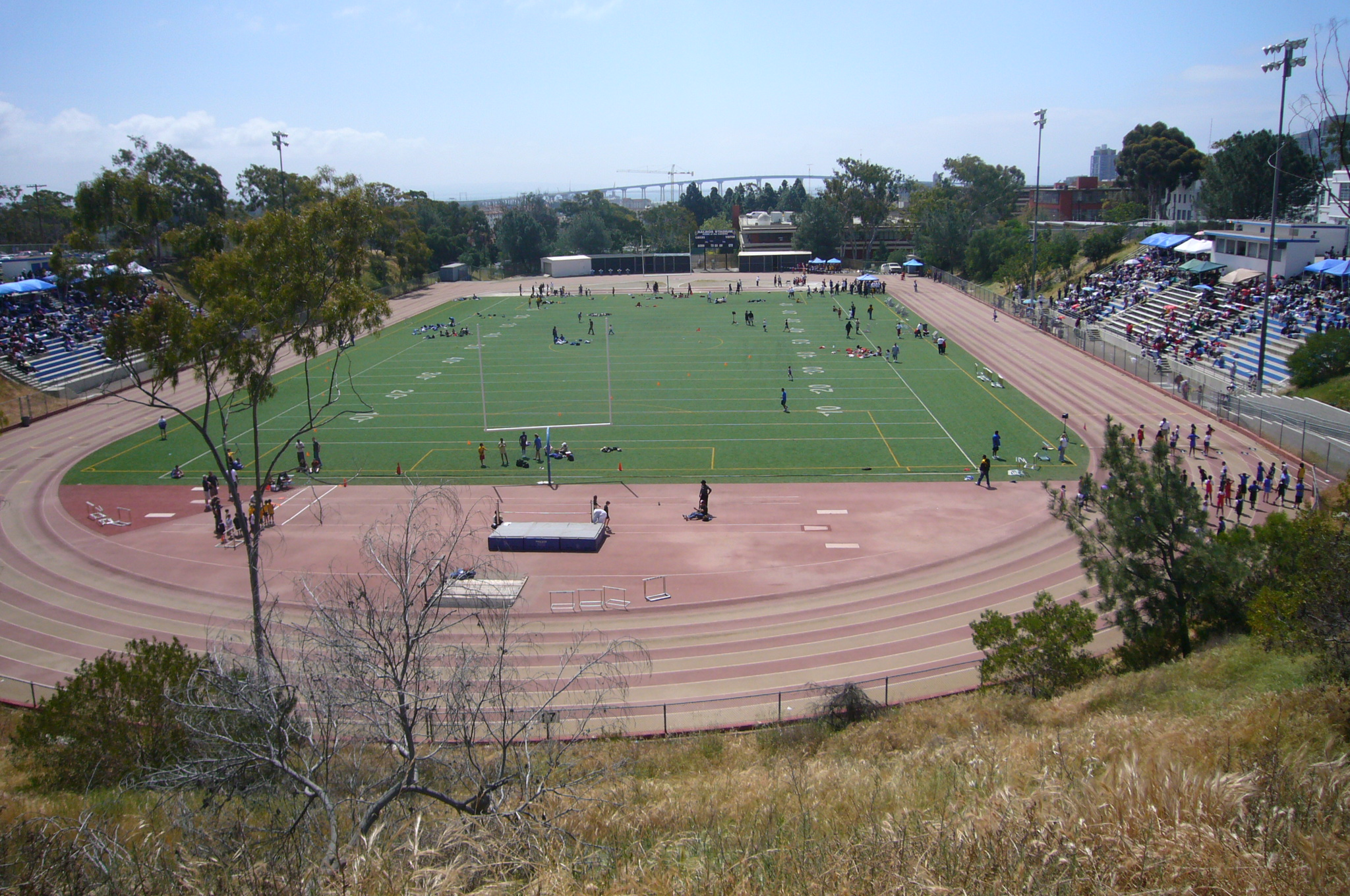
Balboa Stadium

The 1965 USA Outdoor Track and Field Championships men's competition took place between June 25–26 at Balboa Stadium in San Diego, California. The women's division held their championships separately in Columbus, Ohio.

The Marathon championships were run in October at the Yonkers Marathon.

One of the highlights of this meet was the 6 mile run, where Olympic Champion Billy Mills, known for his stunning sprint in the Olympics ("Look at Mills, Look at Mills!") was run down by Gerry Lindgren. Mills surged to take a narrow victory, both men being given the same time, which was the world record.

Also running was Olympic double champion Peter Snell and 1500 silver medalist Josef Odložil as visiting international athletes. Snell had just lost his world record in the mile to Michel Jazy two weeks earlier. While Jim Ryun was a high school star who had run in that same race in the Olympics, his win here was his first American record, narrowly pushed by competition from Snell and Jim Grelle. Olympic Champions Bob Schul and Warren "Rex" Cawley also won.

== Results ==
=== Men track events ===
Event	Gold		Silver		Bronze	
100 yards	George Anderson	9.3	Darel Newman	9.4	Fred Kuller	9.5
220 yards	Adolph Plummer	20.6	Jim Hines	20.7	Thomas Randolph	20.7
440 yards	Ollan Cassell	46.1	Don Owens	46.2	Lynn Saunders	46.4
880 yards	Morgan Groth	1.47.7	George Germann	1.48.0	Thomas Farrell	1.48.0
1 Mile	Jim Ryun	3.55.3 AR	Peter Snell New Zealand; Jim Grelle	3.55.4; 3.55.5	Josef Odložil Czechoslovakia; Cary Weisiger	3.57.7; 4.04.9
3 miles	Bob Schul	13.10.4 AR	Neville Scott	13.10.8	Ron Larrieu	13.11.4
6 miles Video on YouTube	Billy Mills	27.11.6 WR	Gerry Lindgren	27.11.6 WR	Bill Morgan	28.33.8
Marathon	Garnett Williams	2.33.50.6	Ralph Buschmann	2.38.07	John J. Kelley	2.38.56
120 yard hurdles	Willie Davenport	13.6	Blaine Lindgren	13.7	Roger Morgan	13.7
440 y hurdles	Warren Cawley	50.3	Ron Whitney	50.7	Jay Luck	50.8
3000 meters steeplechase	George Young	8.50.6	Jeffrey Fishback	8.51.8	Fred Best	8.52.4
2 miles walk	Ron Laird	14:04.2				

=== Men field events ===
Event	Gold		Silver		Bronze	
High jump	Otis Burrell	2.13 m (6 ft 11 3/4 in)	Ed Caruthers	2.13 m (6 ft 11 3/4 in)	William McClellon	2.13 m (6 ft 11 3/4 in)
Pole vault	John Pennel	5.18 m (16 ft 11 3/4 in) CR	Jeff Chase	4.98 m (16 ft 4 in)	Bob Seagren	4.98 m (16 ft 4 in)
Long jump	Ralph Boston	8.01 m (26 ft 3 1/4 in)	Darrell Horn	7.76 m (25 ft 5 1/2 in)	Gayle Hopkins	7.73 m (25 ft 4 1/4 in)
Triple jump	Art Walker	16.18 m (53 ft 1 in)	Darrell Horn	15.59 m (51 ft 1 3/4 in)	Charlie Craig	15.46 m (50 ft 8 1/2 in)
Shot put	John McGrath	19.20 m (62 ft 11 3/4 in)	Dave Maggard	18.98 m (62 ft 3 in)	Jay Silvester	18.86 m (61 ft 10 1/2 in)
Discus Throw	Ludvik Danek Czechoslovakia; Jay Silvester	62.66 m (205 ft 6 in) CR; 61.75 m (202 ft 7 in)	Dave Weill	58.21 m (190 ft 11 in)	John McGrath	57.00 m (187 ft 0 in)
Hammer throw	Hal Connolly	70.74 m (232 ft 1 in) CR	Ed Burke	68.40 m (224 ft 4 in)	George Frenn	64.06 m (210 ft 2 in)
Javelin throw	Bill Floerke	78.81 m (258 ft 6 in)	Larry Stuart	78.74 m (258 ft 4 in)	Frank Covelli	77.37 m (253 ft 10 in)
Weight throw for distance	Bob Backus	189 ft 3 in (57.68 m)				
Pentathlon	Jim Miller	3095 pts				
All-around decathlon	Bill Urban	7481 pts				
Decathlon	Bill Toomey	7764	Russ Hodge	7682	Don Shy	7289

=== Women track events ===
Event	Gold		Silver		Bronze	
100 yards	Wyomia Tyus	10.5	Diana Wilson	10.8	Marilyn White	11.0
220 yards	Edith McGuire	23.6	Diana Wilson	24.1	Barbara Ferrell	24.5
400 meters	Janell Smith	55.1	Norma Harris	55.9	Jarvis Scott	57.0
800 meters	Marie Mulder	2.11.1	Sandra Knott	2.12.1	Leah Ferris	2.14.0
1500 meters	Marie Mulder	4.36.5	Sandra Knott	4.36.7	Susie Byersdorfer	4.41.0
100 meters hurdles	Cherrie Sherrard	13.7	Rosie Bonds	13.9	Tammy Davis	14.0

=== Women field events ===
Event	Gold		Silver		Bronze	
High jump	Eleanor Montgomery	1.70 m (5 ft 6 3/4 in)	Estelle Baskerville	1.67 m (5 ft 5 1/2 in)	Sarah Cantrell	1.60 m (5 ft 2 3/4 in)
Long jump	Willye White	6.23 m (20 ft 5 1/4 in)	Sonia Guss	5.88 m (19 ft 3 1/4 in)	Beth McBride	5.88 m (19 ft 3 1/4 in)
Shot put	Lynn Graham	14.50 m (47 ft 6 3/4 in)	Cynthia Wyatt	13.38 m (43 ft 10 3/4 in)	Carol Moseke	13.09 m (42 ft 11 1/4 in)
Discus Throw	Lynn Graham	48.07 m (157 ft 8 in)	Cynthia Wyatt	46.40 m (152 ft 2 in)	Carol Moseke	45.78 m (150 ft 2 in)
Javelin throw	RaNae Bair	53.35 m (175 ft 0 in)	Lurline Hamilton	48.92 m (160 ft 5 in)	Virginia Husted	48.77 m (160 ft 0 in)
Pentathlon	Pat Daniels	4399	Denise Paschal	4220	Cherrie Sherrard	4147

== See also ==
- United States Olympic Trials (track and field)
