= 1961 USA Outdoor Track and Field Championships =

National athletics championship event

- Dates: 23–24 June (men); 1–2 July (women)
- Host city: New York City, New York (men); Gary, Indiana (women)
- Venue: Downing Stadium (men); Gilroy Field (women)
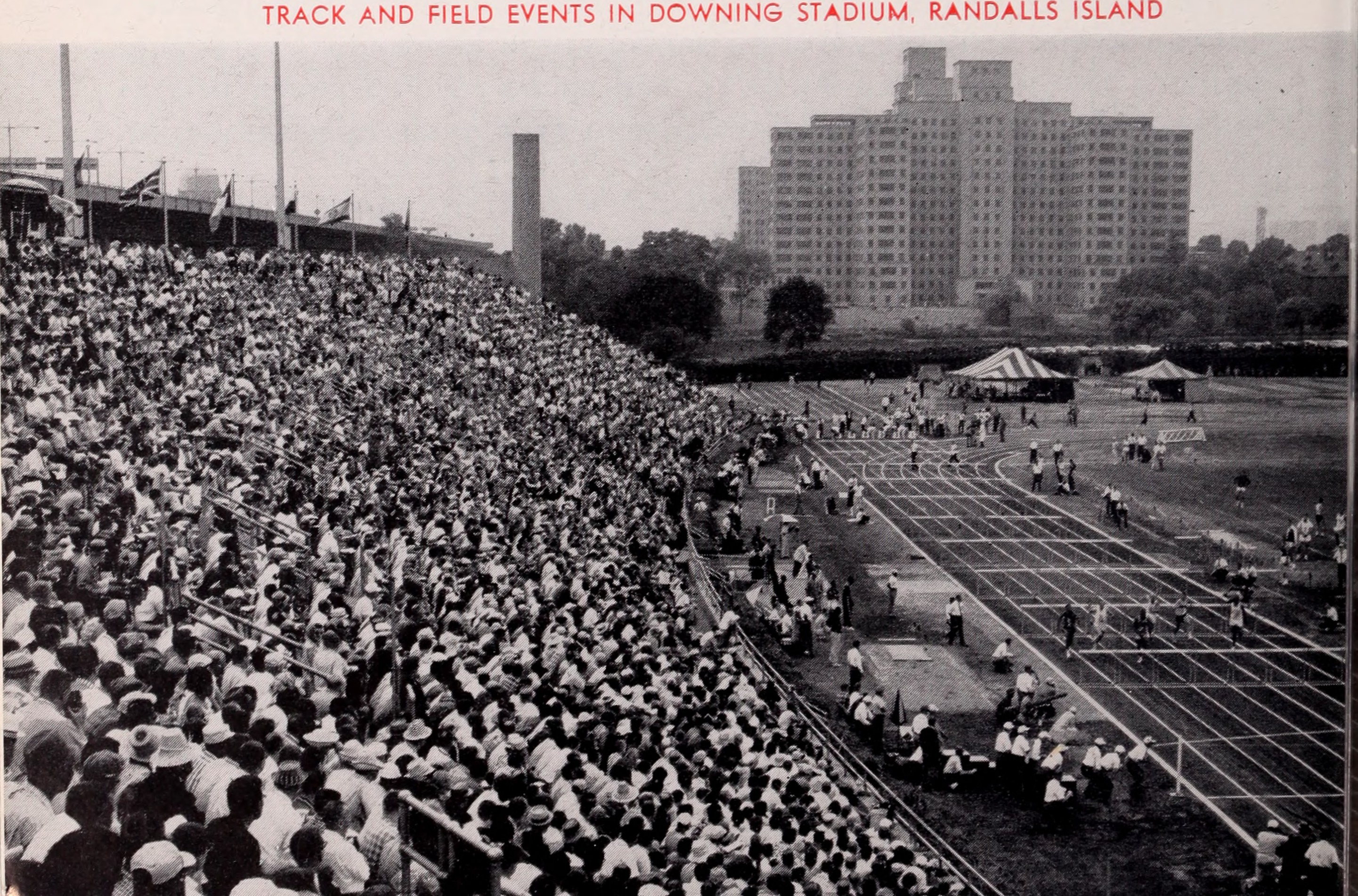

The 1961 USA Outdoor Track and Field Championships were organized by the Amateur Athletic Union (AAU) and served as the national championships in outdoor track and field for the United States.

The men's edition was held at Downing Stadium in New York City, New York, and it took place 23–24 June. The women's meet was held separately at the Gilroy Field in Gary, Indiana, on 1–2 July.

At the men's championships, the weather was clear despite threats of rain, and Frank Budd set a world record of 9.2 seconds in the 100 yards. 20,000 people attended on the final day of the race. In the women's competition, a record 51 clubs competed and the Mayor Daley Youth Foundation won the meet overall.

== Results ==
=== Men ===
Event	Gold		Silver		Bronze	
100 yards	Frank Budd	9.2	Paul Drayton	9.3	David James	9.4
220 yards	Paul Drayton	21.0 w	Charley Frazier	21.0 w	Frank Budd	21.1 w
440 yards	Otis Davis	46.1	Ulis Williams	46.3	Adolph Plummer	46.8
880 yards	Jim Dupree	1:48.5	Jerry Siebert	1:48.5	John Bork	1:48.8
1 mile	Dyrol Burleson	4:04.9	Jim Beatty	4:06.5	Jim Grelle	4:08.0
3 miles	Laszlo Tabori (HUN)	13:50.0	Max Truex	13:52.4	Pat Clohessy (AUS)	13:53.4
6 miles	John Gutknecht	28:52.6	Pete McArdle (IRL)	29:16.8	Nicholas Kitt	29:49.7
Marathon	John J. Kelley	2:26:53.4	Garnett Williams	2:32:10.0	Bob Carman	2:36:06.0
120 yards hurdles	Hayes Jones	13.6	Francis Washington	13.6	Jerry Tarr	13.8
220 yards hurdles	Don Styron	23.2				
440 yards hurdles	Clifton Cushman	50.9	Dixon Farmer	51.2	Lawson Smart	51.2
3000 m steeplechase	Charles(Deacon) Jones	8:48.0	George Young	8:50.8	Bob Schul	8:53.6
2 miles walk	Ron Zinn	14:46.8				
High jump	Bob Avant	2.13 m	John Thomas	2.13 m	Robert Gardner	2.08 m
Pole vault	Ron Morris	4.77 m	John Uelses	4.67 m	Henry Wadsworth	4.67 m
Long jump	Ralph Boston	8.22 m	Anthony Watson	7.95 m	Irvin Roberson	7.90 m
Triple jump	Bill Sharpe	15.97 m	Kent Floerke	15.91 m	Luther Hayes	15.70 m
Shot put	Dallas Long	18.95 m	Parry O'Brien	18.67 m	Gary Gubner	18.36 m
Discus throw	Jay Silvester	59.64 m	Alfred Oerter	58.05 m	Rink Babka	56.84 m
Hammer throw	Hal Connolly	65.09 m	Albert Hall	60.20 m	Tom Pagani	59.33 m
Javelin throw	John Fromm	76.19 m	William Alley	73.09 m	Chuck Wilkinson	72.92 m
Pentathlon	Bill Toomey	3484 pts				
All-around decathlon	Bill Urban	7483 pts				
Decathlon	Paul Herman	7142 pts	David Edstrom	7048 pts	John David Martin	7005 pts

=== Women ===
Event	Gold		Silver		Bronze	
100 yards	Wilma Rudolph	10.8	Lacey O'Neal		Willye White	
220 yards	Lacey O'Neal	25.0	Ernestine Pollards		Vivian Brown	
440 yards	Jackie Peterson	59.5	Mary Rose		Pat Douthitt	
880 yards	Billie Pat Daniels	2:19.2	Leah Bennett		Grace Butcher	
80 m hurdles	Cherrie Parrish	11.5	JoAnn Terry		Leontyne Reif	
High jump	Liz Josefsen (DEN)	1.55 m	Rose Robinson		Barbara Browne	
Long jump	Willye White	6.08 m	Edith McGuire		Flossie Wilcher	
Shot put	Earlene Brown	14.54 m	Cynthia Wyatt		Sharon Shepherd	
Discus throw	Earlene Brown	45.53 m	Sharon Shepherd		Melody McCarthy	
Javelin throw	Fran Davenport	41.96 m	Karen Mendyka		Marjorie Larney	
Women's pentathlon	Billie Pat Daniels	4232 pts	JoAnn Terry	4179 pts	Darlene Everhart	3930 pts

== See also ==
- List of USA Outdoor Track and Field Championships winners (men)
- List of USA Outdoor Track and Field Championships winners (women)
