= 1967 USA Outdoor Track and Field Championships =

- Dates: June 26–28
- Host city: Bakersfield, California; Santa Barbara, California; United States
- Venue: Memorial Stadium, Bakersfield College; La Playa Stadium Santa Barbara City College

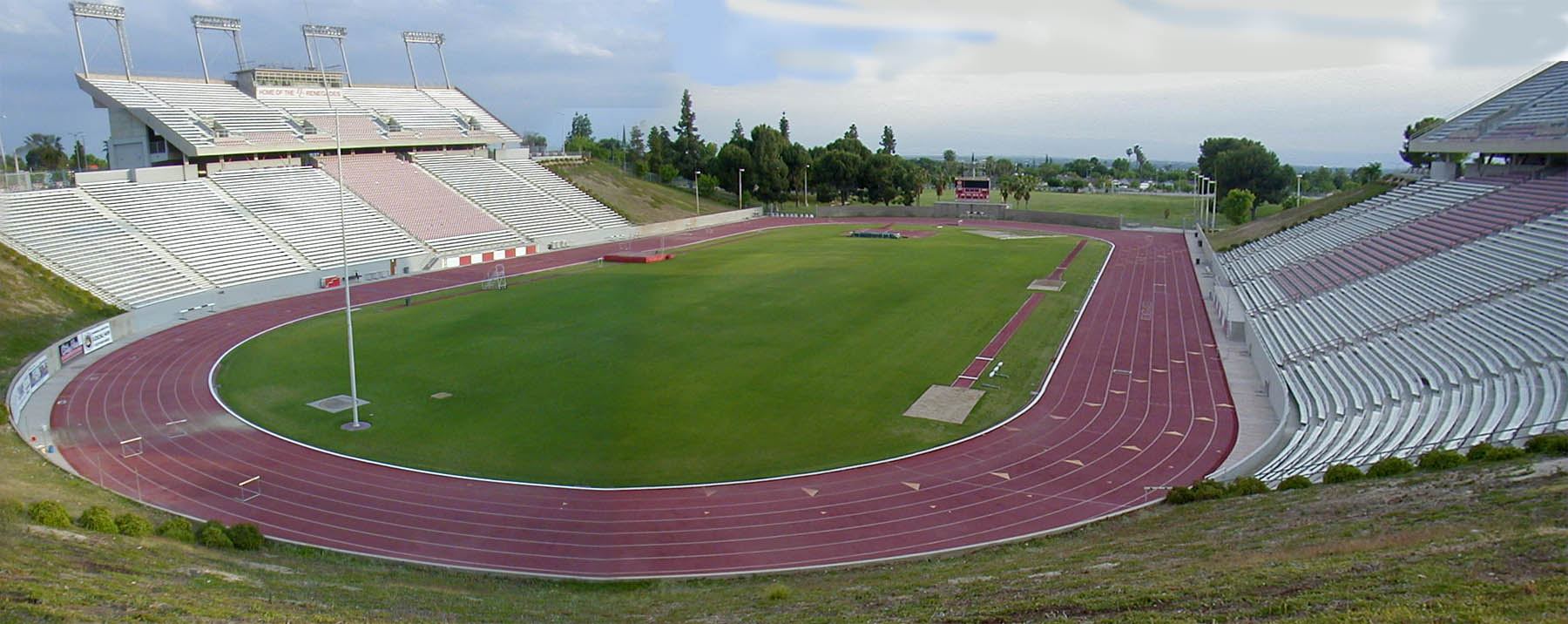
Bakersfield Memorial Stadium

The 1967 USA Outdoor Track and Field Championships men's competition took place between June 26–28 at Memorial Stadium on the campus of Bakersfield College in Bakersfield, California. The women's division held their championships a little over a week later, separately, eighty miles southwest at La Playa Stadium on the campus of Santa Barbara City College, California. Both tracks were dirt tracks, technically a finely crushed brick surface.

This is the meet where Jim Ryun set the world record in the mile, uncharacteristically leading from the gun in 3:51.1, which lasted for almost eight years. Paul Wilson also set the world record in the pole vault at 17 ft 7 3/4 in (5.37 m); which lasted over a year, until runner-up Bob Seagren surpassed it (at altitude) at the 1968 Olympic Trials.

In Santa Barbara, Barbara Ferrell also equalled the world record in the 100 meters at 11.1 (+0.3). Her record would last until Wyomia Tyus broke it in the Olympic final (at altitude) in Mexico City.

== Results ==
=== Men track events ===
Event	Gold		Silver		Bronze	
100 yards	James Hines	9.3	Charles Greene	9.3	Paul Nash; South Africa; Willie Turner	9.4
220 yards	Tommie Smith	20.4 CRy	Jim Hines	20.6	John Carlos	20.8
440 yards	Lee Evans	45.3 CRy	Vince Matthews	45.5	Jim Kemp	45.7
880 yards	Wade Bell	1.46.1 CRy	Dennis Carr	1.47.1	Larry Kelly	1.47.1
1 Mile	Jim Ryun	3.51.1 WR	Jim Grelle	3.56.1	Dave Wilbourn	3.56.2
3 miles	Gerry Lindgren	13.10.6	Lou Scott	13.12.4	Van Nelson	13.16.8
6 miles	Van Nelson	28.18.8	Tom Laris	28.19.2	Ron Larrieu	28.31.2
Marathon	Ronald Daws	2.40.07.4	James McDonagh	2.43.42.0	Ed Winrow	2.47.38.0
120 yard hurdles	Willie Davenport	13.3 = CRy	Earl McCullouch	13.5	Richmond Flowers	13.6
440 y hurdles	Ron Whitney	50.3	Russ Rogers	50.4	Andy Bell	50.6
3000 meters steeplechase	Pat Traynor	8.42.0	Conrad Nightingale	8.43.8	Robert Price	8.44.8
2 miles walk	Ron Laird	13:41.4	Larry Young	14:07.0	Don DeNoon	14:09.6

=== Men field events ===
Event	Gold		Silver		Bronze	
High jump	Otis Burrell	7 ft 0 1/4 in (2.13 m)	Ed Caruthers	7 ft 0 1/4 in (2.13 m)	Clarence Johnson	7 ft 0 1/4 in (2.13 m)
Pole vault	Paul Wilson	17 ft 7 3/4 in (5.37 m) WR	Bob Seagren	17 ft 4 in (5.28 m)	Dick Railsback	17 ft 0 in (5.18 m)
Long jump	Jerry Proctor	26 ft 0 3/4 in (7.94 m)	Ralph Boston	26 ft 0 1/4 in (7.93 m)	Bob Beamon	25 ft 8 3/4 in (7.84 m)
Triple jump	Charlie Craig	53 ft 1 1/2 in (16.19 m)	Art Walker	53 ft 0 1/4 in (16.16 m)	Darrell Horn	51 ft 4 1/4 in (15.65 m)
Shot put	Randy Matson	66 ft 11 in (20.39 m) CR	Neal Steinhauer	65 ft 5 3/4 in (19.95 m)	Dave Maggard	63 ft 6 1/2 in (19.36 m)
Discus Throw	Gary Carlsen	205 ft 10 in (62.73 m) CR	Jay Silvester	195 ft 9 in (59.66 m)	Rink Babka	195 ft 2 in (59.48 m)
Hammer throw	Ed Burke	235 ft 11 in (71.9 m) NR	George Frenn	213 ft 7 in (65.1 m)	Jim Pryde	203 ft 11 in (62.15 m)
Javelin throw	Delmon McNabb	268 ft 3 in (81.76 m)	Gary Stenlund	261 ft 11 in (79.83 m)	Frank Covelli	260 ft 9 in (79.47 m)
Pentathlon	Lynn Baker	3448 pts				
All-around decathlon	Bill Urban	8035 pts				
Decathlon	Bill Toomey	7880	Dave Thoreson	7524	Bill Smith	7341

=== Women track events ===
Event	Gold		Silver		Bronze	
100 meters Wind +0.3	Barbara Ferrell	11.1 WR	Diana Wilson	11.2	Wyomia Tyus	11.3
200 meters	Diana Wilson	23.6	Barbara Ferrell	23.7	Wyomia Tyus	24.0
400 meters	Charlette Cooke	52.5 NR	Kathy Hammond	52.6	Louise Drinkwater	53.5
800 meters	Madeline Manning	2.03.6	Doris Brown	2.03.6	Charlette Cooke	2.08.3
1500 meters	Natalie Rocha	4.29.0	Vicki Foltz	4.29.5	Lori Schutt	4.33.7
80 meters hurdles	Mamie Rallins	10.8	Cherrie Sherrard	11.0	Chi Cheng Taiwan; Patty Van Wolvelaere	11.0 11.2

=== Women field events ===
Event	Gold		Silver		Bronze	
High jump	Eleanor Montgomery	1.68 m (5 ft 6 in)	Franzetta Parham	1.66 m (5 ft 5 1/4 in)	Estelle Baskerville	1.66 m (5 ft 5 1/4 in)
Long jump	Patricia Winslow	6.30 m (20 ft 8 in)w	Willye White	6.12 m (20 ft 3/4 in)w	Martha Watson	5.97 m (19 ft 7 in)w
Shot put	Maren Seidler	14.27 m (46 ft 9 3/4 in)	Lynn Graham	14.15 m (46 ft 5 in)	Carol Moseke	13.36 m (43 ft 9 3/4 in)
Discus Throw	Carol Moseke	46.45 m (152 ft 4 in)	Ranee Kletchka	46.20 m (151 ft 6 in)	Helen Thayer	43.99 m (144 ft 3 in)
Javelin throw	RaNae Bair	59.82 m (196 ft 3 in)	Barbara Friedrich	58.27 m (191 ft 2 in)	Jean Sweeney	50.93 m (167 ft 1 in)
Pentathlon	Patricia Winslow	4824	Cherrie Sherrard	4378	Janet Johnson	4281

== See also ==
- United States Olympic Trials (track and field)
