= 1962 USA Indoor Track and Field Championships =

National athletics championship event

- Dates: February 24 (men); February 17 (women)
- Host city: New York City, New York, United States (men); Louisville, Kentucky, United States (women)
- Venue: Madison Square Garden (men); Freedom Hall (women)
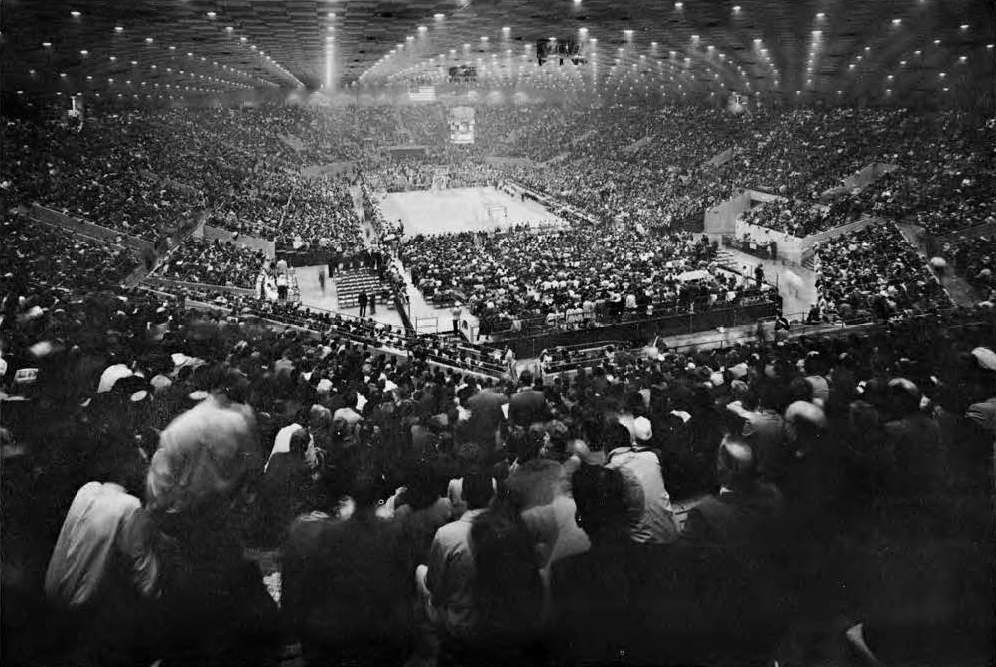
- Level: Senior
- Type: Indoor
- Events: 22 (12 men's + 10 women's)

The 1962 USA Indoor Track and Field Championships were organized by the Amateur Athletic Union (AAU) and served as the national championships in indoor track and field for the United States.

The men's edition was held at Madison Square Garden in New York City, New York, and it took place February 24. The women's meet was held separately at the Freedom Hall in Louisville, Kentucky, taking place February 17.

At the championships, Jim Beatty of the Los Angeles Track Club ran the second-fastest indoor mile of all time in 4:00.2. The time was run despite the race being delayed by 45 minutes, causing the runners to get cold while waiting. 16,384 spectators attended the men's edition.

Other than a special event at the 1948 USA Indoor Track and Field Championships, 1962 was the first time that the running long jump was contested at the women's championships, replacing the standing long jump event.

== Medal summary ==
=== Men ===
Event	Gold		Silver		Bronze	
60 yards	Frank Budd	6.2				
600 yards	Bill Crothers (CAN)	1:10.8	Jack Yerman	1:11.6		
1000 yards	John Reilly	2:11.0				
Mile run	Jim Beatty	4:00.2				
3 miles (Note: The top American and U.S. champion was Jared Nourse of Duke, who ran 14:04.2 for 4th place.)	Bruce Kidd (CAN)	13:48.8	Pat Clohessy (AUS)	13:51.6	Sandor Ilharos (HUN)	13:54.8
60 yards hurdles	Hayes Jones	7.2				
High jump	John Thomas	2.13 m				
Pole vault	Henry Wadsworth	4.67 m				
Long jump	Charles Mays	7.58 m				
Shot put	Gary Gubner	19.15 m				
Weight throw	Al Hall	19.69 m				
1 mile walk	Ron Zinn	6:36.0				

=== Women ===
Event	Gold		Silver	Bronze
50 yards	Willye White	5.9		
100 yards	Willye White	11.2		
220 yards	Vivian Brown	25.5		
440 yards	Sue Knott	58.2		
880 yards	Leah Bennett	2:17.5		
70 yards hurdles	Jo Ann Terry	9.2		
High jump	Estelle Baskerville	1.57 m		
Long jump	Willye White	5.95 m		
Shot put	Sharon Sheppard	13.33 m		
Basketball throw	Cynthia Wyatt	105 ft 7 1/2 in (32.19 m)		
