= 1963 USA Outdoor Track and Field Championships =

- Dates: June 21–23
- Host city: St. Louis, Missouri; Dayton, Ohio; United States
- Venue: Public School Stadium; Welcome Stadium

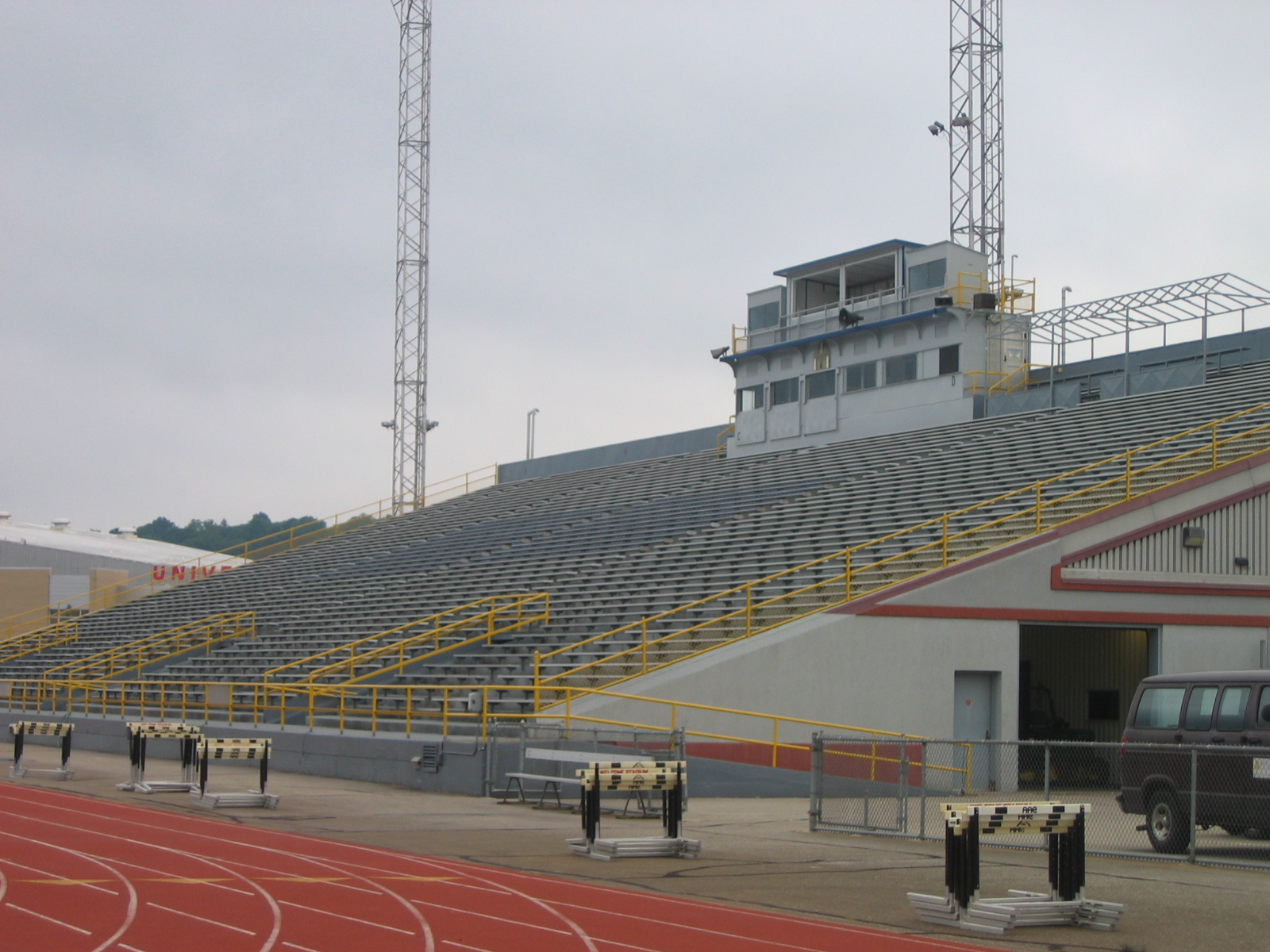
Welcome Stadium hosted the women's championships

The 1963 USA Outdoor Track and Field Championships men's competition took place between June 21–23 at Public School Stadium in St. Louis, Missouri. The women's division held their championships separately at the Welcome Stadium in Dayton, Ohio. The Public School Stadium was one of the first stadiums to sport an all-weather track made of asphalt and rubber.

The Marathon championships were run in October at the Yonkers Marathon.

== Results ==
=== Men track events ===
Event	Gold		Silver		Bronze	
100 yards	Robert Hayes	9.1w	John Gilbert	9.2w	Paul Drayton	9.3w
220 yards	Henry Carr	20.4w	Paul Drayton	20.4w	John Moon	20.6w
440 yards	Ulis Williams	45.8 = MRy	Adolph Plummer	45.9	Lester Milburn	46.4
880 yards	Bill Crothers Canada; Jim Dupree	1.46.8 MRy; 1.47.3	Morgan Groth	1.47.5	Steve Haas	1.47.6
1 Mile	Dyrol Burleson	3.56.7 MRy	Tom O'Hara	3.56.9	Cary Weisiger	3.58.5
3 miles	Patrick Clohessy Australia; Jim Keefe	13.40.4; 13.45.4	Julio Marin Colombia; Charles Clark	13.51.4; 13.54.2	Oscar Moore	14.08.6
6 miles	Peter McArdle Ireland; Ned Sargent	28.29.2; 28.51.0	John Macy	28.51.4	Leslie Hegedus	29.38.0
Marathon	John J. Kelley	2.25.17.6	Jim O'Connell	2.33.14.0	Adolf Gruber Austria; Robert Scharff	2.36.25.0; 2.36.58.0
120 yard hurdles	Hayes Jones	13.60	Blaine Lindgren	13.66	Roy Hicks	13.70
440 y hurdles	Warren Cawley	50.4	Jim Allen	50.5	Willie Atterberry	50.6
3000 meters steeplechase	Pat Traynor	8.51.2	Vic Zwolak	8.53.4	Jeffrey Fishback	8.59.7
2 miles walk	Ron Zinn	14:03.6				

=== Men field events ===
Event	Gold		Silver		Bronze	
High jump	Gene Johnson	2.13 m (6 ft 11 3/4 in)	Paul Stuber	2.13 m (6 ft 11 3/4 in)	Joseph Faust	2.11 m (6 ft 11 in)
Pole vault	Brian Sternberg	4.98 m (16 ft 4 in) CR	John Uelses	4.89 m (16 ft 1/2 in)	Ron Morris	4.89 m (16 ft 1/2 in)
Long jump	Ralph Boston	8.18 m (26 ft 10 in)	Darrell Horn	8.02 m (26 ft 3 1/2 in)	Charlie Mays	7.87 m (25 ft 9 3/4 in)
Triple jump	Kent Floerke	15.74	William Sharpe	15.52	Mahoney Samuels Jamaica; Chris Mousiadis Greece; Herman Stokes	15.46; 15.44; 15.40
Shot put	David Davis	19.04 m (62 ft 5 1/2 in)	Parry O'Brien	18.93 m (62 ft 1 1/4 in)	Gary Gubner	18.43 m (60 ft 5 1/2 in)
Discus Throw	Jay Silvester	60.64 m (198 ft 11 in)	Rink Babka	57.44 m (188 ft 5 in)	Bob Humphreys	56.49 m (185 ft 4 in)
Hammer throw	Albert Hall	65.50 m (214 ft 10 in)	George Frenn	60.60 m (198 ft 9 in)	Ed Burke	59.18 m (194 ft 1 in)
Javelin throw	Larry Stuart	77.80 m (255 ft 2 in)	Frank Covelli	75.11 m (246 ft 5 in)	Ed Red	73.92 m (242 ft 6 in)
Pentathlon	Bill Toomey	3365 pts				
All-around decathlon	Bill Urban	8492 pts				
Decathlon	Steve Pauly	7852	Dick Emberger	7331	Dave Edstrom	7328

=== Women track events ===
Event	Gold		Silver		Bronze	
100 yards	Edith McGuire	11.0	Wyomia Tyus	11.0	Marilyn White	11.0
220 yards	Vivian Brown	24.4	Marilyn White	24.6	Diana Wilson	24.6
440 yards	Suzanne Knott	57.0 =AR	Myrle Lowe	57.2	Carol Bush	57.6
880 yards	Sandra Knott	2:12.5	Carol Mastronarde	2:12.9	Leah Bennett-Ferris	2:16.1
80 meters hurdles	Rosie Bonds	11.3	JoAnn Terry	11.5	Chi Cheng Taiwan; Gertie Derrington	11.8; 11.9

=== Women field events ===
Event	Gold		Silver		Bronze	
High jump	Eleanor Montgomery	1.73 m (5 ft 8 in) MR	Billie Pat Daniels	1.67 m (5 ft 5 1/2 in)	Estelle Baskerville	1.65 m (5 ft 4 3/4 in)
Long jump	Edith McGuire	5.91 m (19 ft 4 1/2 in)	Willye White	5.80 m (19 ft 1/4 in)	Chi Cheng Taiwan; Billie Pat Daniels	5.71 m (18 ft 8 3/4 in); 5.70 m (18 ft 8 1/4 in)
Shot put	Sharon Shepherd	14.72 m (48 ft 3 1/2 in)	Cynthia Wyatt	14.16 m (46 ft 5 1/4 in)	Earlene Brown	13.84 m (45 ft 4 3/4 in)
Discus Throw	Sharon Shepherd	45.87 m (150 ft 5 in)	Cynthia Wyatt	44.73 m (146 ft 9 in)	Melody McCarthy	44.42 m (145 ft 8 in)
Javelin throw	Fran Davenport	46.90 m (153 ft 10 in) MR	RaNae Bair	46.90 m (153 ft 10 in)	Gloria Wilcox	46.30 m (151 ft 10 in)
Pentathlon	Billie Pat Daniels	4261	Barbara Browne	4192	Joyce Lawson	3901

== See also ==
- United States Olympic Trials (track and field)
