= Gerrish =

Gerrish may refer to:

== People ==
- Benjamin Gerrish (1717–1772), merchant and political figure in Nova Scotia
- Billy Gerrish (1884–1916), English professional footballer
- Howard Gerrish (1910–1988), author and teacher
- Jeffrey Gerrish, American lawyer
- John Gerrish (1910–2010), American composer
- Joseph Gerrish (1709–1774), soldier, merchant, judge and political figure in Nova Scotia
- Louise Gerrish (born 1948), track and field athlete
- Moses Gerrish (1744–1830), United Empire Loyalist
- Samuel Gerrish 1680s-1741), bookseller and publisher in Boston, Massachusetts
- Sylvia Gerrish (1860–1906), American musical theatre performer
- William Gerrish (1898–1978), British philatelist
- Winfield Scott Gerrish (1849-1882), figure in the lumber industry

== Geography ==
- Gerrish Township, Michigan, a civil township
- Gerrish, New Hampshire, an unincorporated place
- Gerrish Warehouse, an historic warehouse in Maine

== Other ==
- E.H. Gerrish Canoe Company
- Gerrish's Regiment, an infantry regiment of the Massachusetts line
- Gerrish-Higgins School District, Michigan
