= Masters M70 hammer throw world record progression =

Masters M70 hammer throw world record progression is the progression of world record improvements of the hammer throw M70 division of Masters athletics. Records must be set in properly conducted, official competitions under the standing IAAF rules unless modified by World Masters Athletics. The M70 division consists of male athletes who have reached the age of 70 but have not yet reached the age of 75, so exactly from their 70th birthday to the day before their 75th birthday. The M70 division throws a 4 kg implement.

Key

Incomplete information Pending

Distance	Athlete	Nationality	Birthdate	Location	Date
59.04A	Ed Burke	United States	04.03.1940	Lake Tahoe	30.05.2010
57.59	Ed Burke	United States	04.03.1940	Walnut	17.04.2010
56.45	Ed Burke	United States	04.03.1940	Walnut	17.04.2010
54.48	Ed Burke	United States	04.03.1940	Walnut	17.04.2010
53.12	Bob Ward	United States	04.07.1933	Coppell	24.07.2004
52.95	Takahashi Minoru	Japan	1933	Akita	2003
52.02	Richard Rzehak	Germany	13.10.1929	Crailsheim	14.10.2001
50.78	Carlos Blumenfeldt	Chile	10.01.1931	Santiago de Chile	13.05.2001
50.72	Pentti Saarikoski	Finland	13.01.1926	Turku	01.09.1996
48.76	Bo Berglund	Sweden	26.06.1926	Karlstad	10.08.1996
48.56	Olav Reppen	Norway	09.07.1911	Bronnoysund	16.09.1982
