= Judge Bush =

Judge Burke may refer to:

- Carol Bush (born 1962), county judge of Ellis County, Texas
- John K. Bush (born 1964), judge of the United States Court of Appeals for the Sixth Circuit
- Leland Bush (born c. 1951), judge of the District Court of Minnesota
- Lynn J. Bush (born 1948), judge of the United States Court of Federal Claims
- Zoe Bush (born 1954), senior judge of the Superior Court of the District of Columbia
