= Jim Allen (hurdler) =

American track and field athlete

Jim Allen (born August 3, 1941) is an American track and field athlete, primarily known as a hurdler. 1963 was his one year of success, rising to be ranked #4 in the world in the 400 meters hurdles. Running as a walk on for Washington State University, he finished second to Rex Cawley of USC, first at the NCAA Championships and then again at the 1963 USA Outdoor Track and Field Championships, qualifying him to represent the USA in international competition. The team was managed by Payton Jordan. He ran his personal best of 50.1 against West Germany in a meet in Hannover.

His career ended the following year as he tore his hamstring going over the first hurdle of the first of the NCAA Championships.
