= Mihály Iglói =

Hungarian running coach (1908–1998)

Mihály Iglói (September 5, 1908 – January 4, 1998) was a Hungarian distance running coach. Iglói coached runners such as Sándor Iharos, István Rózsavölgyi, László Tábori, Bob Schul and Jim Beatty. Counting both outdoors and indoors, and distances no longer officially recognized, Iglói's students achieved 49 world records.

== Iglói's athletic career and rise to fame as a coach ==
Iglói was a notable runner in the 1930s. A multiple-time Hungarian champion, Iglói participated in the 1500 metres at the 1936 Summer Olympics in Berlin, but was eliminated in the heats. Iglói became the coach of Honvéd Budapest, then the Hungarian army club, in 1950, and the results of his pupils steadily improved.

The first world records for the Honvéd Budapest runners came as team efforts in the uncommon 4 × 1500 m relay in 1953 and 1954. Wholesale individual record breaking began on May 14, 1955, with Sándor Iharos beating Gaston Reiff's old 3000 metres record in Budapest with a time of 7:55.6. By the end of that year, Iharos held the world records over 1500 metres, 3000 metres, two miles and 5000 metres. István Rózsavölgyi had smashed the previous record over 2000 metres by almost five seconds with a time of 5:02.2; this was arguably the most impressive single mark by any of Iglói's Hungarian pupils, and lasted longer than any of Iharos' records. (It was eventually broken by Michel Jazy on June 14, 1962 with a time of 5:01.6.) László Tábori had tied Iharos' 1500m mark, and had become the third man in the world to run a four-minute mile.

== 1956 Melbourne Olympics ==
As the form of Iglói's students continued in the Olympic year 1956, with both Rózsavölgyi and Iharos running further world records, team Hungary seemed poised to take the lion's share of medals in the long track events. However, that was not to be. The team's mentality and spirit was badly shaken as the Hungarian Revolution of 1956 was bloodily crushed by the Soviet military just weeks before the Melbourne Olympics. Iharos missed Melbourne entirely due to an ankle injury. Tábori and Rózsavölgyi underperformed and finished out of medals.

== Career in the United States ==
Iglói (and Tábori) did not return to the communist Hungary after the Olympics. They moved to the United States and eventually migrated to the west coast, with Iglói becoming the coach of the Los Angeles Track Club and later the Santa Monica Track Club. Though Tábori stayed in good shape and continued to compete, his international career was effectively over, as he could no longer run for Hungary and was not yet a US citizen.

Iglói, however, now had access to a talented generation of American runners, several of whom would eventually make an international impact. On February 10, 1962, Jim Beatty became the first man to run a four-minute mile indoors. Beatty also set world records over two miles both outdoors and indoors and American records over many other distances. Bob Schul became a world-beater in 1964, running a new two mile world record (8:26.4) and winning the Olympic 5000 metres in Tokyo that year with an impressive last lap sprint. However, injuries forced both Schul and Beatty to retire prematurely.

Still continuing his coaching career, Iglói moved to Greece in 1970, but did not meet with similar success there. After the fall of communism in Hungary he moved back to his native country, and died in Budapest in 1998.

== Training methods ==
The key to Iglói's methods was interval training. Arduous training sessions twice a day sought to develop both speed and stamina. A typical Iglói session involved tens of repetitions of short intervals up to 400 metres with only short jog recoveries, distance run in the longest and hardest sessions totaling up to as much as 35 kilometers. Compared to other similar interval training systems, Iglói's had an emphasis on repetitions of such short sprints as 100 or 200 metres. His method was also inspired by the 'style' running of the 1930s in that he never used a stop watch but regarded his runners intensely and broke up the set of intervals when the described speed (e.g. 'good swing tempo') could no longer be run as relaxed as demanded
