= Darrell Horn =

American track and field athlete (born 1939)

Medal record

Men's athletics

Representing the United States

Pan American Games
Silver medal – second place	1963 São Paulo	Long jump

Darrell Horn (born August 5, 1939) is an American track and field athlete known for jumping events. He was the silver medalist in the long jump at the 1963 Pan American Games. As a long jumper Horn also finished second in the American championships twice, 1963 and 1965, each time beaten by world record holder Ralph Boston. He also competed in the Olympic Trials twice in the long jump 1960 and 1964, finishing in fifth place both times. He ranked in the worldwide top 10 six times between 1960 and 1966, peaking at #4 in 1963.

As a triple jumper, he also finished second in the American championships twice, 1965 and 1966, both times defeated by Art Walker. He did three Olympic Trials, missing out on a trip to Mexico City by one place in 1968. In both events, he was in second place after the Semi-Olympic Trials, which were held during the 1960s, but was unable to duplicate those performances in the final.

Collegiately he jumped for Oregon State University. High school was Pilot Rock, Oregon High School, where he excelled in the long jump and running events.

Towards the end of his career he was nominally involved in an attempted professional track league intended for 1970. The league never got off the ground but Horn was among 11 athletes who were listed as potential participants at a time when professionalism of any kind was harshly disciplined. Horn appealed. While other athletes were able to retain their eligibility, Horn didn't make it to the 1972 Trials.

Horn later competed in Masters Track and Field.
