= Charley Frazier =

American football player (1939–2022)

No. 28, 81
- Position: Wide receiver

Personal information
- Born: August 12, 1939; Houston, Texas, U.S.
- Died: August 16, 2022 (aged 83)

Career information
- High school: Marshall (TX)
- College: Texas Southern
- NFL draft: 1960: undrafted

Career history
- Houston Oilers (1962–1968); Boston Patriots (1969–1970)

Awards and highlights
- AFL All-Star (1966)

Career NFL statistics
- Receptions: 207
- Receiving yards: 3,452
- Touchdowns: 29
- Stats at Pro Football Reference

Charles Douglas Frazier (August 12, 1939 – August 16, 2022) was an American professional football player who was a wide receiver for nine seasons in the American Football League (AFL) and the National Football League (NFL). He played for the Houston Oilers and Boston Patriots from 1962 to 1970. Frazier was an AFL All-Star in 1966.

== Early life ==
Frazier was born in Houston on August 12, 1939. He attended Marshall High School in nearby Angleton, Texas. He then studied at Texas Southern University, where he starred for the Texas Southern Tigers on its track and field team. He was teammates with future New York Giants receiver Homer Jones. Frazier ran the 100-yard dash in 9.4 seconds and 220 yards in 20.8 seconds. He did not play college football, and was undrafted after graduating in 1962.

Frazier was a nationally accomplished sprinter at the senior level, finishing runner-up in the 220 yards at the 1961 USA Outdoor Track and Field Championships.

== Professional career ==
Despite a lack of college football experience, Frazier signed with the Houston Oilers of the American Football League (AFL) prior to the 1962 AFL season. With George Blanda and Don Trull at quarterback, Frazier totaled 1,129 receiving yards and 12 touchdown receptions in the 1966 season. His 12 touchdown receptions were the second-most in the AFL that year, trailing only Lance Alworth's 13. Frazier was named to the East's 1966 AFL All-Star team for his accomplishments. In the All-Star game, Frazier scored the game-winning touchdown on a 17-yard pass from Vito Parilli.

In March 1969, the Oilers traded Frazier, Sid Blanks, Ronnie Caveness, and Larry Carwell to the Boston Patriots for Leroy Mitchell. The Patriots placed Frazier on the move list in December 1970, rendering him ineligible to play for the remainder of that season. He retired with 207 receptions, 3,452 receiving yards, and 29 touchdowns.

== Later life ==
After retiring from professional football, Frazier spent several seasons coaching in the high school and college ranks. He coached at Rice University, the University of Tulsa and Texas Christian University (TCU). After spending six seasons at TCU, he returned to Houston and became a teacher and coach at Reagan High School. When he retired from teaching in 2006, he became a team ambassador for the Houston Texans of the National Football League.

Frazier died on the evening of August 16, 2022, four days after his 83rd birthday.

== See also ==
- List of American Football League players
