= Bob Schul =

American long-distance runner (1937–2024)

Robert K. Schul
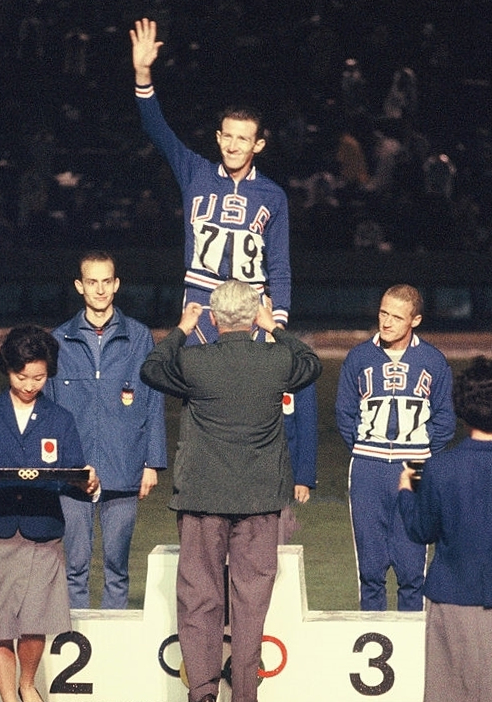
- Bob Schul (center) at the 1964 Olympics

Personal information
- Nationality: United States
- Born: September 28, 1937 West Milton, Ohio, U.S.
- Died: June 16, 2024 (aged 86) Middletown, Ohio, U.S.
- Height: 6 ft 0 in (183 cm)
- Weight: 146 lb (66 kg)

Sport
- Sport: Long-distance running
- Event: 5000 metres
- College team: Miami University
- Coached by: Mihály Iglói

Achievements and titles
- Personal bests: 5000 meters: 13:38.0; 3 miles: 13:10.4; 2 miles: 8:26.4; Steeplechase: 8:47.6; 3000 meters: 7:59.9; 2000 meters: 5:10.2; Mile: 3:58.9; 1500 meters: 3:40.7
Medal record
Representing the United States
Olympic Games
Gold medal – first place	1964 Tokyo	5,000 meters
Pan American Games
Bronze medal – third place	1963 Sao Paulo	5000 meters

Robert Keyser Schul (September 28, 1937 – June 16, 2024) was an American long-distance runner. As of 2024, he is the only American to have won an Olympic gold medal in the 5000 m, at the 1964 Summer Olympics in Tokyo.

== Early career ==
Schul, born and raised on a farm in West Milton, Ohio, was born with asthma, which bothered him throughout his career. As told by his brother Larry he started running as a child against his brothers in Indian relays where one would start at the back of the pack and work to get to the front. This would come to be one of the tactics he would later use in his running. He started running for his school in seventh grade and continued through high school (4:34.4 mile). He graduated from Milton-Union High School in 1955. He continued his collegiate career in 1956, at Miami University in Ohio, where he broke the school record in the mile as a sophomore running 4:12.1. He graduated in 1966.

He joined the Air Force as an enlisted airman and for a year had limited training because of Air Force schooling. In May 1960, he was assigned to Oxnard Air Force Base in California and Max Truex (himself a world class distance runner, who placed sixth in the Olympic 10,000 meters that year) became his commanding officer. In June, after one month of good training, Schul ran the USA championships; he placed fifth in his trial race, running 3:55 for 1500 meters. In 1961, Truex introduced Schul to Hungarian coach Mihály Iglói. Under Iglói's training, Schul finished third at the national championships in the 3000 m steeplechase. In 1962, he ran well indoors at two miles, with only one American, Jim Beatty, running faster. However, after several poor races that spring, Schul was diagnosed with mononucleosis and spent three months in an Air Force hospital. The next winter, Schul became the US Indoor Champion, running 13:39.3 for three miles. A few weeks later, he ran the third fastest indoor two miles ever (8:37.5), though losing to Beatty's world record time of 8:30.7. With a partially torn soleus muscle, Schul placed third in the Pan American Games at 5K, but the injury kept him from competing in the U.S. Championships.

== 1964 success ==
Returning to Miami University in the fall of 1963, Schul continued using Iglói's training methods, with some innovations. The highlights of his 1964 indoor season were a new American record time for three miles, 13:31.4 (then the second fastest indoor time in the world), and two wins over 10,000 meters world record holder Ron Clarke of Australia.

Schul posted an extremely impressive outdoor season in 1964, not losing a single race and beating among others Bruce Kidd, Gerry Lindgren, Billy Mills, Bill Baillie, and Bill Dellinger. Schul first broke the American record in the 5000m at Compton, running 13:38.0. Schul did not run in the NCAA Championships that year, as he thought it unfair for a twenty-six-year-old to be running against younger opponents. He won both the US Championship and the separately held Olympic Trials that year. On August 29, 1964, Schul set a new world record for two miles of 8:26.4, eclipsing the previous mark of 8:29.6 by Michel Jazy of France.

For the first time Track and Field News and Sports Illustrated picked an American to win a distance race, as Schul went to the Games having both the best time in the world in the 5000m and the new two-mile world record. The Olympic final was held in heavy rain. In the last lap, Jazy appeared poised to take the gold, as he had opened up a ten-meter lead on the back stretch; however, Schul ran an impressive 37.8 for the last 300 meters on a muddy track. He caught Jazy 50 meters before the finish line, and pulled away for a clear victory to take the gold medal.

== Injuries and retirement ==
After returning home, Schul's knee was hurting and he could not run for four months. Using a YMCA pool and stationary bicycle throughout the winter, he resumed running in March 1965.

With only three months of training, Schul won the US Championship again in 1965, this time over three miles again, setting a new American record of 13:10.4. He stated afterward, "it was the toughest race I ran and won." Schul never managed to regain his 1964 level again, though he did run personal bests over the metric distances of 1500 meters (3:40.7) and 3000 meters (7:59.9) in Europe.

In August 1965, Schul's knee began hurting again and he decided to retire. He resumed training in 1967 for fitness purposes and this led him to the 1968 Olympic trials at South Lake Tahoe. With numerous injuries and limited training, he still managed to place fifth in the final. In that final, he had an asthma attack after a few laps and struggled throughout, fainting as he crossed the finish line.

In 1971, for one year, Schul served as the national coach for Malaysia and then moved back to the U.S., re-settling in Ohio. In his spare time he continued to train club athletes. In 1978, the Air Force sent all their top distance runners to Wright Patterson Air Force Base in Ohio to train under Schul. After a year of training, many of the athletes reduced their times enough to compete in National events. Schul himself participated in road races along with his club athletes until the age of sixty, when his right leg and back problems prevented further racing. Along the way, Schul became a top masters runner (33.55 for 10,000 m and 76:00 for half marathon at age fifty; 17:56 for 5,000 m at age 60). In October 2007, Schul had his right hip replaced.

Schul was employed at Wright State University in Dayton, Ohio, as its men's and women's cross country and track coaches from 1996 to 2007.

== Death ==
Schul died in Middletown, Ohio on June 16, 2024, at the age of 86.

== Bibliography ==
- Schul, Bob; Laura Rentz Krause (2000). In the Long Run. Landfall Press. ISBN 0-913428-82-5.
- Schul, Bob; Wang, Shuai (2016). After the Olympic: From Injuries to World Record. Self Publish. ASIN B01FSZHT5U.
- Schul, Bob; Wang, Shuai (2016). Speed Work for Distance Training: From the Mile to the Marathon. Self Publish. ASIN B01DIG0MMI.
