= László Tábori =

American middle and long-distance runner

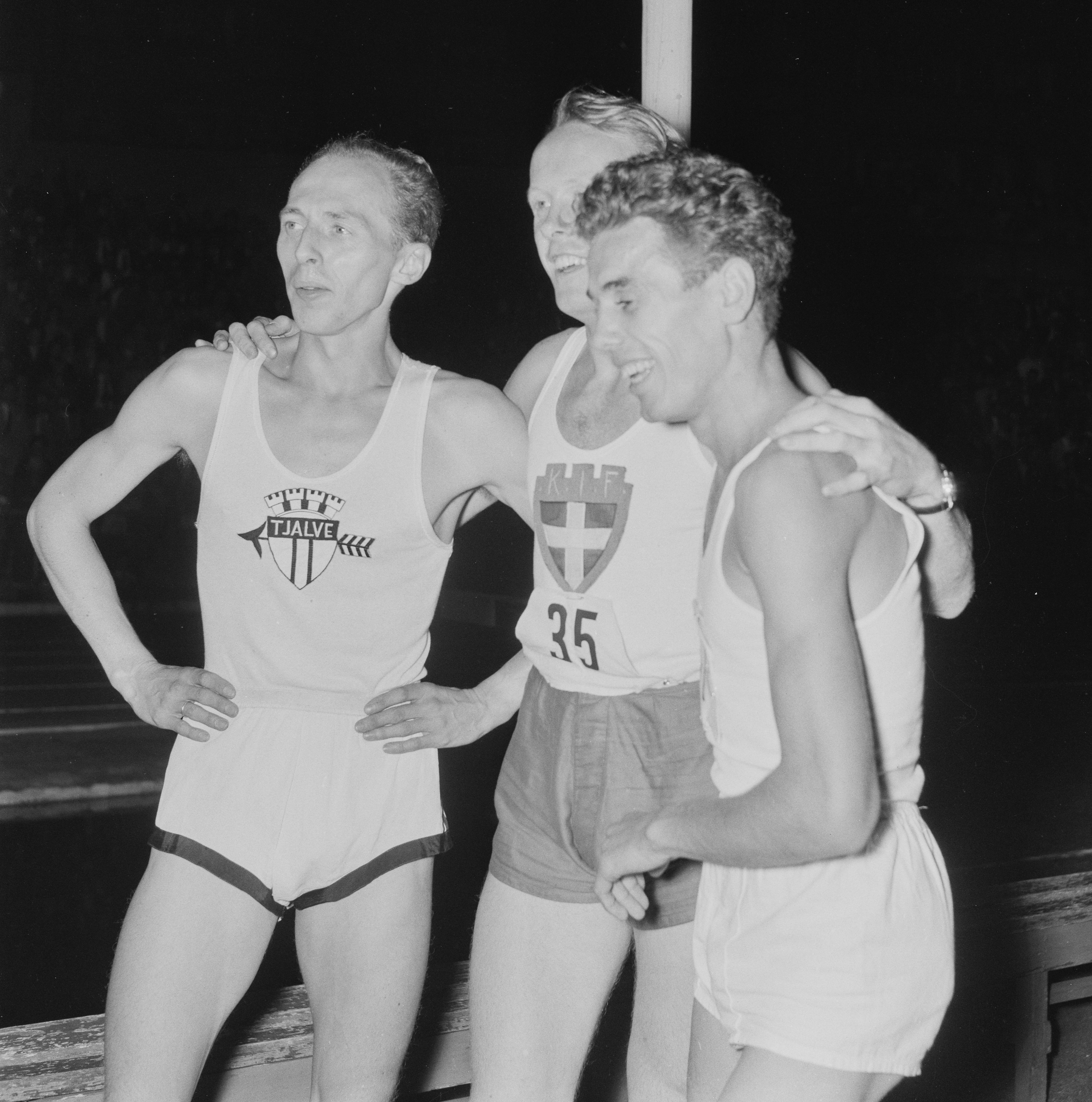
- Audun Boysen, Gunnar Nielsen and László Tábori in Oslo, 1953

Personal information
- Nationality: Hungarian
- Born: 6 July 1931 Košice, Czechoslovakia
- Died: 23 May 2018 in (aged 86) Los Angeles, California, USA
- Height: 175 cm (5 ft 9 in)
- Weight: 61 kg (134 lb)

Sport
- Sport: Athletics
- Event: middle distance
- Club: BHSE, Budapest

László Tábori (July 6, 1931 – May 23, 2018) was a Hungarian middle- and long-distance runner, best known for equalling the 1500 metres world record and placing 4th in that event at the 1956 Summer Olympics.

== Biography ==
=== Early career and rise to fame ===
Tábori was born in Košice. Although he had already taken up running in his youth, his serious career only started in the early 1950s under Mihály Iglói, the legendary coach of Tábori's club, Honvéd Budapest. Already part of the world-record-breaking 1953 and 1954 4 x 1500 metres relay teams of Hungary and the Honvéd Budapest club respectively, he exploded to international fame in 1955, together with Iglói's other star pupils, Sándor Iharos and István Rózsavölgyi. On May 28, 1955, he became only the third man in the world to run a four-minute mile, running 3:59.0 and soundly beating both Chris Chataway and Brian Hewson. (For more than twenty years, he and Rózsavölgyi would remain the only Hungarians to run a four-minute mile.) On September 6, he equalled the 1500 metres world record (set just a month earlier by Iharos) with a time of 3:40.8.

=== 1956 Melbourne Olympics ===
The 1956 Melbourne Olympics occurred at a psychologically unfortunate time for team Hungary, as the Hungarian Revolution of 1956 had just been bloodily crushed by the Soviet military. (This was all the worse as Honvéd Budapest was at that time the sports club of the Hungarian army.) The effects of this were obvious. Iharos missed out on the Olympics entirely, ostensibly due to a minor ankle injury but quite probably because of the revolution, and Rózsavölgyi shockingly went out in the 1500 m heats. Tábori did much better by comparison; expected to medal, he still finished a very respectable 4th in the 1500 metres and 6th in the 5000 metres. At the close of the Melbourne Games, Tábori decided to defect to the West with his coach, Mihály Iglói. He soon left for the United States and settled in California, where he remained for the rest of his life.

=== Post Olympics ===
Tabori won the British AAA Championships title in the 1 mile event at the 1960 AAA Championships.

=== Coaching career ===
Tábori returned to distance running as a coach in 1967, his training methods based directly on Iglói's. He coached the now defunct program at Los Angeles Valley College to three state championships and coached the San Fernando Valley Track Club since 1973. He was a vocal advocate of interval training. His most notable pupil was Jacqueline Hansen, who ran two world records in the marathon. Miki Gorman also ran a world record in the marathon. He continued coaching at the University of Southern California, coaching among others, Duane Solomon.

=== Death ===
Tábori died on May 23, 2018, at Cedars-Sinai Medical Center in Los Angeles. He was 86 years old.

Records
Preceded by (Hungary) Sándor Iharos (tied)	Men's 1500 m World Record Holder; September 6, 1955 – August 3, 1956	Succeeded by (Hungary) István Rózsavölgyi
