= Gerrish Warehouse =

- Formerly listed on the U.S. National Register of Historic Places
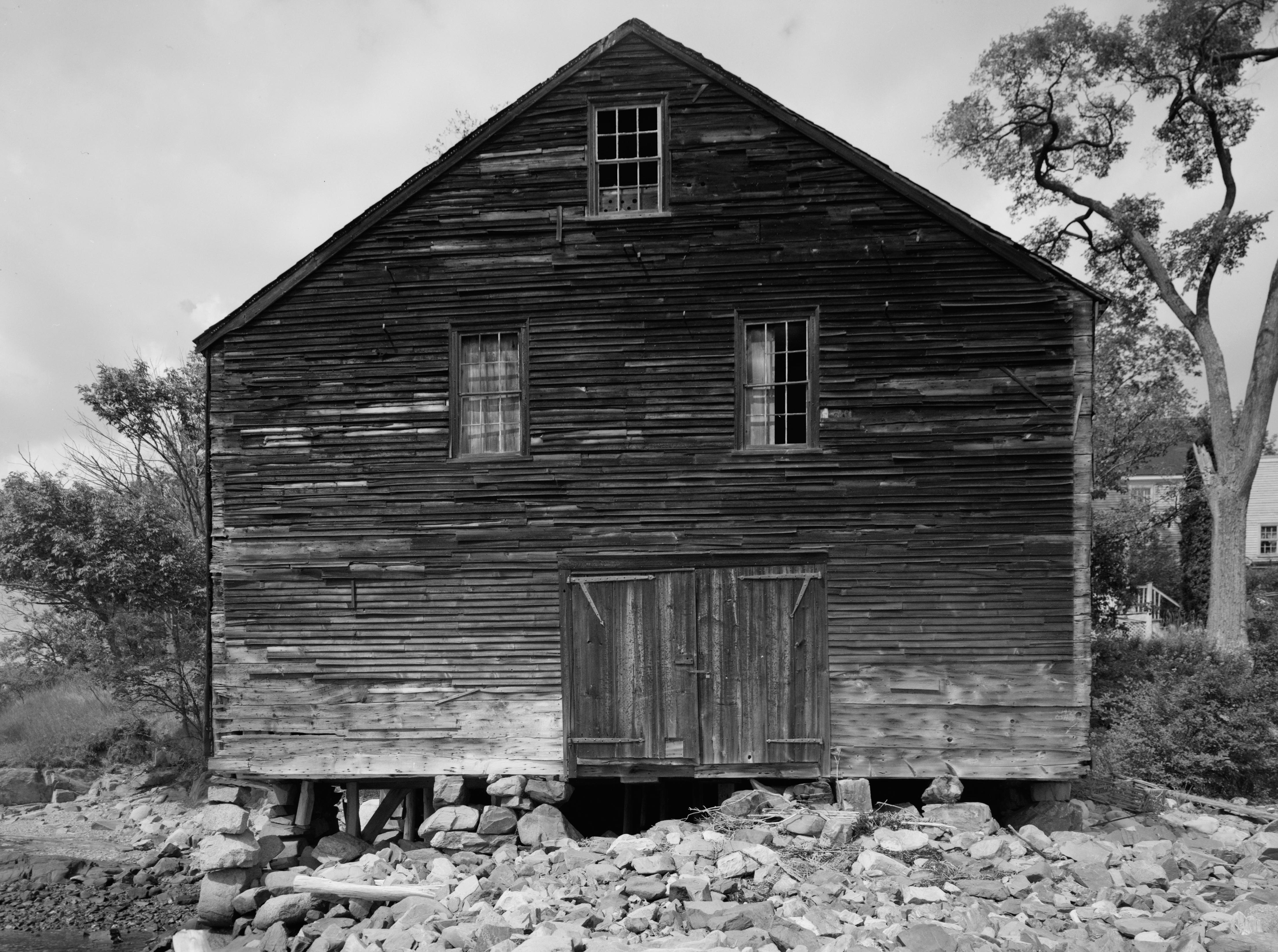
- Front of the warehouse, 1965 HABS photo

- Location within Maine Location within the United States
- Location: Pepperrell Cove off ME 103, Kittery, Maine
- Coordinates: 43°4′52″N 70°43′6″W
- Area: 1 acre (0.40 ha)
- Built: 1710
- NRHP reference No.: 77000140

Significant dates
- Added to NRHP: May 26, 1977
- Removed from NRHP: September 29, 2015

The Gerrish Warehouse was a historic 18th-century warehouse, located on Pepperrell Cove in Kittery Point, Maine. Built c. 1710, it was one element of the Pepperrell family's shipping empire, notably run in the mid-18th century by Sir William Pepperrell. Converted into a ship chandlery in the 19th century, it was sold to the Maine Maritime Museum in 1976, and was added to the National Register of Historic Places in 1977. The museum's plan to move the building by barge to a new location was judged infeasible, and it was subsequently demolished after the museum had recovered its contents. It was removed from the National Register in 2015.

== Description and history ==
The Gerrish Warehouse was located on the southern shore of Kittery Point, off Pepperrell Road (Maine State Route 103) just beyond the cemetery of the First Congregational Church. The building was a 2-1/2 story wood frame structure, with a gable roof, clapboard siding, and a stone foundation, and measured about 35 by 45 feet (11 m × 14 m). It had large doors at its northern and southern facades, the south (water-facing) ones of simple boards, those facing north paneled. It had sash windows, with interior shutters that slid into place. Its floors consisted of plain floorboards, with access to the upper level gained by ladder stairs.

The warehouse was built c. 1710, and was one part of the large shipping empire of the Pepperrell family, whose most famous member was Sir William Pepperrell, who led colonial military forces in the successful 1745 Siege of Louisbourg and was knighted for this success. Pepperrell's descendants, Loyalists during the American Revolutionary War, had their properties seized by the state and sold off. In 1797 the warehouse came into the hands of Robert Follett, whose daughter married William Thompson Gerrish. The Gerrishes converted the building into a ship chandlery, finally selling it to the Maine Maritime Museum in 1976. Although the museum developed plans to move the building to a more secure location (its foundation was being undermined by tidal erosion), these plans were not realized, and the building was subsequently demolished; its contents remain at the museum's location in Bath.

== See also ==
- National Register of Historic Places listings in York County, Maine
