= Lacey O'Neal =

American hurdler (born 1944)

Personal information
- Born: March 30, 1944 (age 82) Chicago, Illinois, United States

Sport
- Sport: Track and field
- Event: 80 metres hurdles

Lacey O'Neal (born March 30, 1944) is an African American hurdler. She competed in the women's 80 metres hurdles at the 1964 Summer Olympics.
