= William Gerrish =

British philatelist

William Ewart Ebenezer Gerrish (18 June 1898 – 7 June 1978) was a British philatelist who was added to the Roll of Distinguished Philatelists in 1958.
