= Sharon Shepherd =

American athlete (born 1938)

Medal record

Women's athletics

Representing the United States

Pan American Games
| Silver medal – second place | 1959 Chicago | Shot put |
| Bronze medal – third place | 1963 São Paulo | Shot put |
| Bronze medal – third place | 1963 São Paulo | Discus |

Sharon Shepherd (born June 1, 1938) is an American track and field athlete, primarily known for throwing events. She is a multiple time American champion, winning both the shot put and discus at the 1963 USA Outdoor Track and Field Championships. Prior to winning, she had finished in second place three times and third twice in the shot put.

== Career ==
Shepherd competed in the Olympic Trials four times dating back to 1956 as an 18-year-old, finishing in second place in the shot put in 1960, and third in both shot and discus in 1968, however she never appeared in the Olympics. She also competed in the javelin throw and pentathlon in the national championships. She did represent the United States in international dual meets. She was the silver medalist in the shot put at the 1959 Pan American Games, and bronze medalist in both shot and discus in 1963.

In 2001, Sharon Shepherd was enshrined in the athletics hall of fame of her alma mater, Linfield College in McMinnville, Oregon. Source: https://golinfieldwildcats.com/honors/linfield-athletics-hall-of-fame/sharon-shepherd/29

1960 graduate of Linfield College, McMinnville, Oregon. Attended Linfield, 1956–1960

Sports: Women's Basketball, Field Hockey, Volleyball, Track & Field, although not a Linfield women's sport at the time, 1956–1960, when she was a student-athlete.

1960 Linfield College graduate Sharon Shepherd was an athlete of exceptional ability, from her youth in Oregon's Lane County, until she competed for the final time six years ago, at age 57.

In 2001, she will be the first woman athlete and the third woman to be enshrined in the Linfield Athletics Hall of Fame since was founded in 1998.

She was a member of Wildcat intercollegiate teams in basketball, field hockey, and volleyball, her favorite sport. Sharon also excelled in track and field and softball, although at the time, Linfield had no women's teams in these sports.

Among her many athletic successes were traveling around the world, competing on U.S. national track and field teams; and playing and coaching field hockey and volleyball teams in state, regional and national championships.

Now semi-retired, living in Durham, North Carolina, she was born in Portland, Oregon, and educated on the Oregon coast in Florence (grades 1–6) and Mapleton (7–12) public schools.

She was a sports standout for the Sailors of Mapleton High School, from which she graduated in 1956. Sky Pennel and Liz McCain were her high school coaches.

"She was a superb athlete, the most outstanding that I can remember. Sharon competed during a time there was very little recognition for girls. She was such a competitor, she made any coach look good," said Pennel.

McCain said Sharon "excelled in all sports. It was a thrill for me to have a student with her athletic ability."

After high school, Sharon was a shot and discus record-setter. She set the U.S. outdoor shot record during a meet in Portland. She held the National AAU indoor and outdoor shot titles three times. For 10 years (six of them as an All-American) she was among the top three Americans in both events.

Traveling to track meets took her around the U.S. and to other countries. This included the U.S. Olympic track and field trials: 1956, Washington, D.C.; 1960, Abilene, Texas; 1964, New York, and 1968, New York and Los Angeles. She was a U.S. track team alternate for the 1960 Rome and 1964 Tokyo Olympic Games.

She represented the U.S. in the Pan American Games in Chicago, 1959, and São Paulo, Brazil, 1963.

She was a member of the exceptional 1961 U.S. team which made a three-week, four-meet European tour with dual meets against the Soviet Union, Poland, Great Britain and West Germany. In 1957, she was on the first U.S. sports team to compete in the Soviet Union.

In addition to being a volleyball athlete and coach, she was a collegiate volleyball official at state, regional and national championships. For two years, she was voted one of the top 10 U.S. volleyball officials.

Mariann Johnson Culley (Linfield 1960), now of Pendleton, Oregon, was Sharon's roommate. Both good athletes, they ran many of the practice drills for their Linfield teams. They both were employed in the Pioneer Hall cafeteria, working all three meals and at all college banquets.

Sharon started as a freshman at the University of Oregon, Mariann said, "But it was too big, she felt no one cared. So, she left the UO after three days and came to Linfield," which offered her about $125 a semester in non-scholarship help. However, Sharon retained a UO connection. She traveled to Eugene for coaching by Bill Bowerman, that university's legendary track coach.

After graduating from Linfield, she taught in North Bend, Ore., then earned a master's degree from Ohio University. She has done post graduate work at the Indiana University, Ohio State University and the University of North Carolina. She has been a faculty member and women's and men's volleyball coach at Georgia Southwestern State University, Denison University in Ohio, and Stetson University in Florida. In addition, she was the county physical education and special education coordinator for Grayson County Schools in Virginia. And she spent 18 years as a semi-truck driver. Tributes for Sharon Shepherd come from both Mariann Culley and Gene Carlson.

An indication of her dedication to athletic excellence, "Sharon worked out on the Linfield track seven days a week, from 2-5 p.m. She also had a key to the Riley Gym weight room and weight trained. This was a time when women did not work out, much less use weights," said Mariann.

Gene (Linfield 1961) adds, "I remember Sharon's openness and pure athletic doggedness. While my teammates and I would be playing baseball at Linfield, Sharon was working out on the track, mostly on her own, because she was way too far ahead of her time. While we players lollygagged around, Sharon would get her discus and shot and practiced. Then she would take an Army duffel bag full of wet towels, heave it up to her shoulders and jog around the track. At that time, I wasn't ready to think of women as great athletes. But now I believe Sharon is one of the best ever to graduate from Linfield College."
