= Charles Craig (triple jumper) =

American track and field coach and triple jumper

Personal information
- Born: October 17, 1942 (age 83) Fresno, California, United States

Sport
- Sport: Track and field
Medal record
Representing United States
Pan American Games
Gold medal – first place	1967 Winnipeg	Triple jump

Charles "Charlie" Craig (born October 17, 1942) is an American track and field coach and former triple jumper. He was the gold medalist at the 1967 Pan American Games and was an American champion both indoors and outdoors.

Craig attended California State University, Fresno, eventually gaining a master's degree there. As a student-athlete, he competed for the Fresno State Bulldogs track team and was among their leading men in jumps and sprints. He was a key part of the Bulldog's 1964 team that won the NCAA Division I Outdoor Track and Field Championships (Fresno's first). He broke the American collegiate record for the triple jump and won that title at the NCAA Championships. His jump of 15.77 m (51 ft 8 3/4 in) defeated all comers, although due to wind-assistance it was not ratified as a collegiate record (being an improvement of more than 15 inches on any previous mark).

He competed at the United States Olympic Trials in the year of his NCAA victory and placed fifth overall. Moving on from the college circuit, he placed third nationally at the USA Outdoor Track and Field Championships in 1965 and 1966 before finally taking his first American title at the 1967 USA Outdoor Track and Field Championships. This brought him selection for that season's Pan American Games held in Winnipeg and his best jump of 16.54 m (54 ft 3 in) (wind assisted, but only two centimetres short of Adhemar da Silva's games record) was enough hold off Brazil's Nelson Prudencio and win the gold medal. This made him the second American to win that title, following in the footsteps of the previous champion, Bill Sharpe. In his last year of competition, he won at the USA Indoor Track and Field Championships with a meet record of 16.50 m (54 ft 1 1/2 in) (a personal record) and then placed third at the USA Outdoors.

He began his coaching career as an assistant to Sam Bell for the California Golden Bears at the University of California, Berkeley. He was recruited by California State University, Bakersfield in 1971 and a year later became head coach for an entirely new track and field program. He led the program to success in NCAA Division II competition, coaching 18 national champions and winning the honour of 2002 NCAA Division II Track and Field Coach of the Year. He also took on roles in the national professional team, being assistant coach for both the 1991 World Championships in Athletics and the 1996 Atlanta Olympics. He was inducted into the USTFCCCA Hall of Fame in 2008 for his achievements in building the Cal State Bakersfield Roadrunners track team. He was head coach for the Roadrunners for over thirty years. In 1991, Craig was inducted into the Fresno County Athletic Hall of Fame.

== National titles ==
- USA Outdoor Track and Field Championships
  - Triple jump: 1967
- USA Indoor Track and Field Championships
  - Triple jump: 1968
- NCAA Division I Outdoor Track and Field Championships
  - Triple jump: 1964
