= Pat Clohessy =

Australian long-distance runner and coach (1933–2026)

Patrick Andrew Clohessy AM (16 May 1933 – 28 September 2026) was an Australian runner and distance running coach.

== Middle distance career ==
Clohessy grew up in Muswellbrook, New South Wales, and Tamworth, New South Wales, due to his father Patrick being the postmaster with the Postmaster-General's Department in these rural towns. He took up running when he joined the Muswellbrook Athletics Club in 1953. He had early success in winning the 1954 New South Wales Country Championships 880 yards and one mile events in record time. He then moved to Sydney to run for Randwick Botany Athletics Club. Clohessy then moved to the United States to study and lecture at the University of Houston. He encouraged Australian middle-distance runner Allan Lawrence to study there. Lawrence went on to win the 5000m at 1960 NCAA Championship.

Notable performances by Clohessy as an athlete included:

- Won the 3 Miles NCAA Championship while at the University of Houston in 1961 (Philadelphia in 13:47.7) and 1962 (Eugene in 13:51.6)
- Won the Amateur Athletic Union 3 miles in 1963.
- 7th in the 3 Miles at the 1962 British Empire and Commonwealth Games
- 3rd in the World Games in Helsinki in 1963.

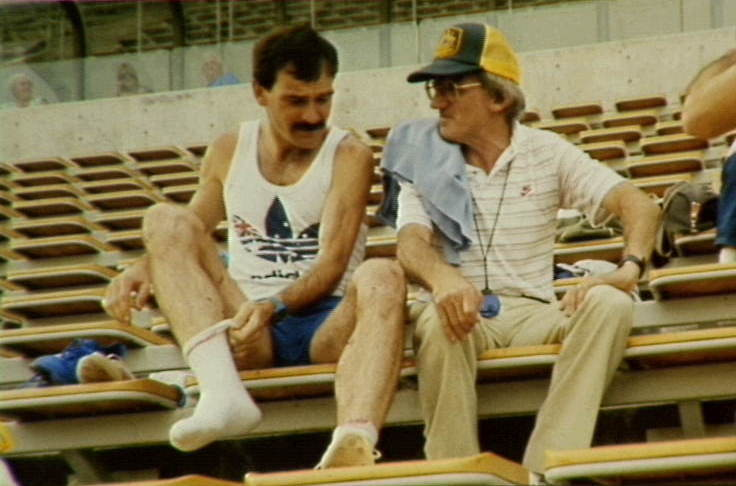
AIS Distance Running Coach Pat Clohessy (right) with World Champion marathoner Robert de Castella in 1984

== Coaching career ==
After returning to Australia from the United States, Clohessy became a teacher and athletics coach at Xavier College in Melbourne. It was at Xavier College that Clohessy started to coach Robert de Castella, who would go on to win the marathon at the 1982 Commonwealth Games, 1986 Commonwealth Games and the 1983 World Championships in Athletics. In 1983, after 16 years at Xavier College, he was appointed distance running coach at the Australian Institute of Sport (AIS). It was a position he held until 1994 when he took up an Athletics Australia coaching position in Brisbane, Queensland.

In 1998, he took up a position as athletics coach at the University of Queensland.

Clohessy was an athletics coach on the 1980 and 1984 Australian Olympic teams and 1983 and 1987 World Championships teams.

Notable Australian and AIS athletes coached by Clohessy include: Robert de Castella, Krishna Stanton, Simon Doyle, Shaun Creighton, Susan Hobson, Pat Scammell, Matt Favier, Pat Carroll, Andrew Lloyd and Brittany McGowan.

In 1994, Susan Hobson edited the book - Pat Clohessy : athlete, coach, mentor published by the Australian Sports Commission.

== Death ==
Clohessy died in Brisbane, Queensland on 28 September 2026, at the age of 93.

== Recognition ==
- 1984 – Member of the inaugural Australian Sports Commission Board
- 1988 – Appointed Member of the Order of Australia (AM) in the 1988 Queen's Birthday Honours for his service to sport as a track and field coach.
- 1997 – Life Membership of Athletics Australia
- 1997 – Sport Australia Hall of Fame General Member
- 2000 – Australian Sports Medal
- 2014 – Life Governor of Athletics Australia
