= Carol Bush =

American politician

Ellis County Judge
- In office April 8, 2009 – December 31, 2018
- Preceded by: Chad Adams
- Succeeded by: Todd Little

Personal details
- Born: September 1, 1962 (age 64)
- Party: Republican

Carol Lynn Bush (born September 1, 1962) is a Republican Party politician originally from San Antonio, Texas, who formerly served as the county judge of Ellis County, south of Dallas. She resides in the county seat of Waxahachie.

== Path to county judge ==
In March 2009, she was appointed county judge by the Ellis County Commissioners' Court to fill the unexpired term of Chad Adams, who resigned to take a position in the private sector.

She defeated fellow Republican Kelly Kovar in the Republican primary election for county judge held on March 2, 2010, and then won the position in the general election.

== Previous public service ==
Prior to assuming her current office, Bush maintained a law and mediation practice and previously served Ellis County as County Court at Law Judge in 1996 and 1997. She also served as an assistant District and County Attorney.

== Education and law license ==
Carol Bush is a member of the State Bar of Texas and the Ellis County Bar Association. She holds a Juris Doctor (1987) from St. Mary's University School of Law and a Bachelor of Arts from Trinity University, both institutions in San Antonio. She obtained her license to practice law in May 1988.

== Tenure in the bench ==
Judge Bush and two Ellis County commissioners were censured by the Ellis County Republican Party for raising property taxes by 5.12 percent during one of the worst recessions in Texas history.

At the time of Bush's confirmation as county judge by the Ellis County Commissioners' Court on April 8, 2009, she stated, "If my interests are for the people, then that is going to be reflected in my actions for this court."

Judge Bush won her second elected term in the Republican primary held in March 2014. She garnered 52.3 percent of the ballots cast.

In 2016, Judge Bush used a salary grievance committee—of which she is by law the non-voting chair—and argued on her own behalf that her salary should be raised. The committee was composed of nine members of the public randomly selected from the county jury pool. The committee granted her a pay raise from $95,000 to $165,000 a year, an increase of 74 percent.

In 2018, Bush ran for reelection, but was defeated in the Republican primary by Todd Little, who went on to win the general election.
