= Louise Gerrish =

American javelin thrower

Louise Gerrish (born 1948 in Melrose, MA) is a former nationally renowned track and field athlete.

During the mid-1960s, Gerrish lived in Livonia, Michigan and was a high school All-American and one of the best javelin throwers in the United States; even though the javelin throw is not an official Michigan High School Athletic Association event.

As a Livonia-Franklin High School sophomore, Gerrish finished first at the 1964 USA (AAU) national 17 and under championships. The same week she finished third at the 1964 USA Amateur Athletic Union adult national championships; she reprised her bronze medal performance at the 1966 AAU finals. The following year, Gerrish placed third at the Pan-American Games Trials; she also recorded a lifetime-best throw of 54.50 meters, to rank 11th worldwide in 1967. Her personal bests still stand as records in Michigan, Ohio and New York, partly due to a later design change in the javelin. Her competitive track career ended in 1972 when she tore a knee meniscus and ACL trying to make the US Olympic team. She later took up tennis and played number one doubles on the winning women's open 5.0 team at the USTA national league championships in 1986. She has since played on USTA league teams at nationals in 2012, 2014, 2015, 2016, and 2018. In 2023 she played on the third place team at the 65 and over national USTA 9.0 women's doubles league championships.

Joined by Olympians Francie Kraker and Micki King, Gerrish was one of several sportswomen who represented the Michigammes Athletic Club of Ann Arbor, Michigan.
