= Otis Burrell =

American track and field athlete

Medal record

Men's athletics

Representing the United States

Pan American Games
| Silver medal – second place | 1967 Winnipeg | High jump |

Otis Burrell (born May 9, 1944) is an American track and field athlete, primarily known for the high jump where he is a four time American champion outdoors, including three straight victories and a one time indoor champion. Burrell won the silver medal at the 1967 Pan American Games, and was the No.1 ranked American high jumper in 1965, 1966 and 1969. Burrell's personal best is 2.19 m (7 ft 2 in).

Burrell attended Jefferson High School in Los Angeles, where he competed in the high jump, and was in a three-way tie for first place at the 1962 CIF California State Meet. Jefferson is the same high school as Olympic champion Charles Dumas, the first man to jump 7 feet. Burrell was the ninth. Burrell then went to Los Angeles Valley College and University of Nevada, Reno. While at Reno, he was the 1966 NCAA Champion, as well as finishing fourth in the 120 yard hurdles. Both colleges elected Burrell to their athletic Halls of Fame. Burrell now coaches for Palos Verdes Peninsula High School.

Burrell remains active in masters athletics, competing in the high jump and hurdles.
