= Carol Moseke =

American discus thrower (born 1945)

Personal information
- Full name: Carol Jean L. Moseke
- Born: March 8, 1945 (age 81) Cedar Rapids, Nebraska, U.S.
Medal record
Women's athletics
Representing the United States
Pan American Games
Gold medal – first place	1967 Winnipeg	Discus throw

Carol Jean L. Moseke Frost (born March 8, 1945, in Cedar Rapids, Nebraska) is a female track and field athlete from the United States, competing in the discus throw. She represented her native country at the 1968 Summer Olympics, and won the gold medal in the women's discus throw event at the 1967 Pan American Games in Winnipeg, Manitoba, Canada.

She was a four-time champion in the women's discus at the USA Outdoor Track and Field Championships.

Following the Olympics, Moseke returned to Nebraska and married Larry Frost, a former Nebraska football player, and from 1977 to 1980, Carol Frost coached the Huskers' women's track and field team. Among her first athletes was Merlene Ottey, who won the first AIAW Championship for the Nebraska program. Ottey went on to win the most women's Olympic track and field medals ever.

Later, she got out of coaching track to coach football alongside her husband and eventually coached her sons Steve Frost and Scott Frost during their days as high school stars at Wood River High School. Steve, a former college lineman and long snapper at Colorado State and Stanford, is the public address announcer for Stanford Football home games, a job he's done for over 20 years. Scott quarterbacked the 1997 Nebraska Cornhuskers football team to a national championship, before becoming offensive coordinator at the University of Oregon, and later becoming the head coach at the University of Central Florida and the University of Nebraska.

As Carol Frost, she has continued to compete into the Masters age groups. She holds the current American record in the W65, W70, and W75 Shot Put; the W60, W65, W70, and W75 records in the Discus; and the W65, W70, and W75 World record in the Javelin.
