= Jim Beatty =

American distance runner

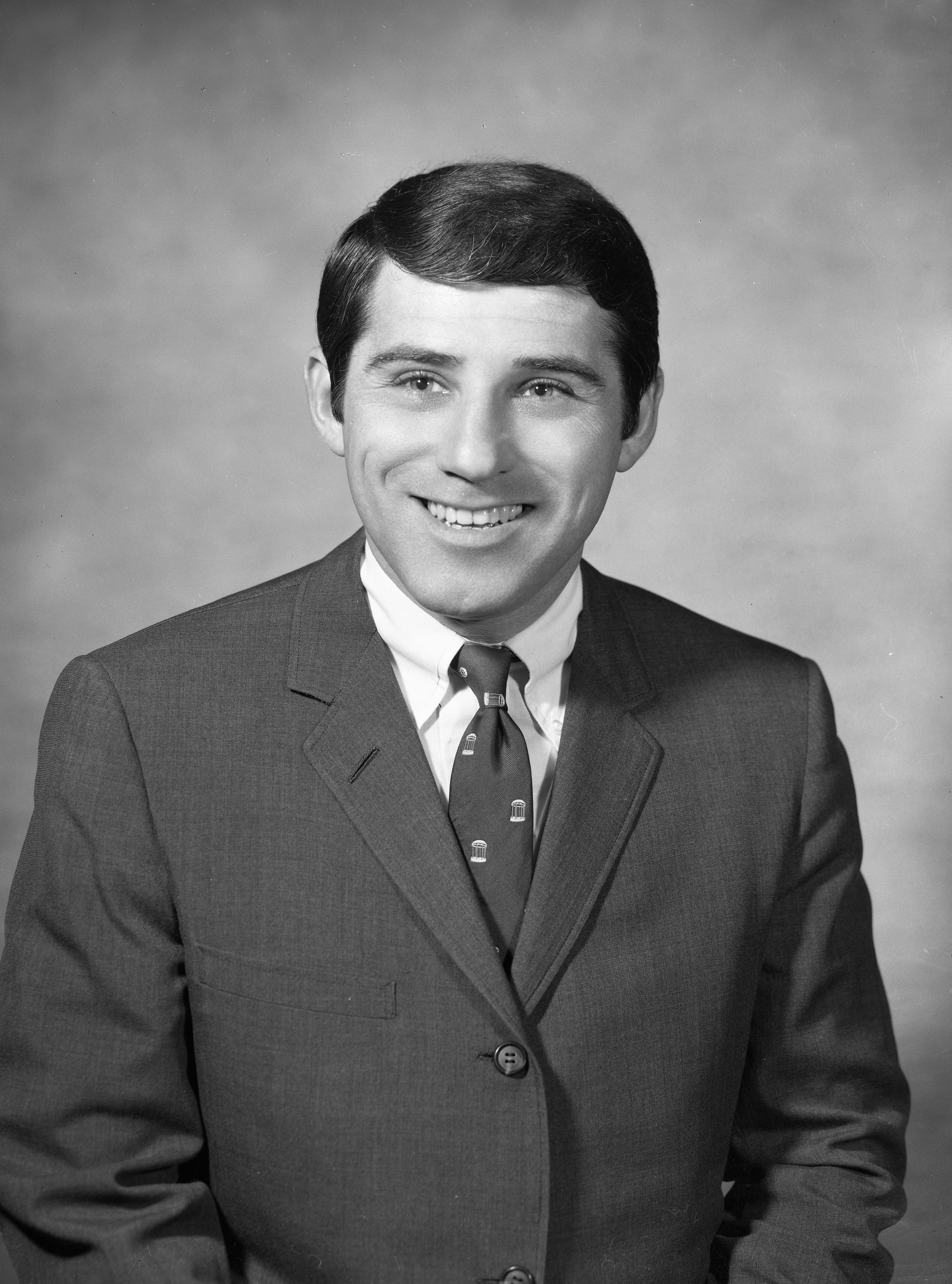
- Beatty c. 1971

Personal information
- Full name: James Tully Beatty
- Born: October 28, 1934 (age 91) New York City, New York, U.S.
- Home town: Charlotte, North Carolina, U.S.
- Spouse: Paulette Beatty (m. 1976)
Medal record
Men's athletics
Representing the United States
Pan American Games
Silver medal – second place	1963 São Paulo	1500 metres

James Tully Beatty (born October 28, 1934, in New York, New York) is an American former track and field athlete and North Carolina politician. He is best remembered as the first person to break the four-minute mile barrier on an indoor track, when he ran 3:58.9 on February 10, 1962, at the Los Angeles Invitational in the Los Angeles Sports Arena in Los Angeles, California. He competed in the men's 5000 metres at the 1960 Summer Olympics.

== Early life ==
Beatty moved to Charlotte, North Carolina, with his family when he was four years old. He grew up in the Dilworth neighborhood, delivering for the Charlotte Observer with his trusted dog "Trigger" for five years. Then focused on boxing, young Beatty would run his paper route to help him train. While at Central High School, the last meet of his junior year Beatty convinced his coach to let him run the mile event. His speed was discovered in that race, as he went on to win. In the course of a month, Beatty went from never running in a race before, to winning a state championship in the mile. He finished high school as a two-time NCHSAA state champion in the mile, winning in 1952 and 1953.

== College career ==
Beatty went on to run track at University of North Carolina at Chapel Hill where he majored in English and had a minor in History. Graduating from UNC-Chapel Hill in 1957, Beatty's best time in the mile was 4:06. He was an All-American for the two miles in 1955 and 1957, and for the 5,000 meters in 1956. Beatty was also the Atlantic Coast Conference champion in the mile in 1955 and 1956.

== International career ==
In 1960, Beatty moved to California to train under Mihály Iglói and in July 1960, he won the U.S. Olympic Trials in the 5,000 meters event. Standing at just five foot-five, Beatty's Olympic teammates, who elected him team captain in 1962, called him "Little Jimmy Beatty." After running at the 1960 Rome Olympic Games he joined the Los Angeles Track Club in 1961. Beatty broke eleven American and three world records in 1962, and became the first American to simultaneously hold records in the 1,500 meter, 3,000 meter, 5,000 meter, one and three mile events. He became the first person to break the four-minute mile barrier on an indoor track, when he ran 3:58.9 on February 10, 1962, at the Los Angeles Invitational. Because of his outstanding performance he was named the 1962 James E. Sullivan Award as the nation's top young athlete. He was also the first recipient of the ABC's Wide World of Sports Athlete of the Year that year.

== Personal life ==
Beatty married his wife, Paulette in 1976. He has two biological children and two step-children. Beatty served in the North Carolina General Assembly as a State Representative as a member of the Democratic Party, representing North Carolina's 36th district, in Mecklenburg County. He worked on voting rights legislation and expanding Medicare, being a close friend and ally of both Governor Jim Hunt, and Terry Sanford, before running for the United States Congress in 1972, eventually losing in the general election to future Republican Governor of N.C. James G. Martin. In his later years, Beatty flirted with a run for lieutenant-governor and a return to the general assembly, before dropping out, citing personal reasons.

Beatty and his wife, Paulette reside in their Charlotte, North Carolina home, where Beatty remains an active member of the community, endorsing politicians like U.S. Senate Candidate Jeff Jackson and North Carolina Governor Roy Cooper for statewide offices.

Beatty was inducted into the USA National Track and Field Hall of Fame in 1990, the North Carolina Sports Hall of Fame in 1963, and the Greater Charlotte Sports Hall of Fame in 2004.
