= Adolph Plummer =

American track and field athlete

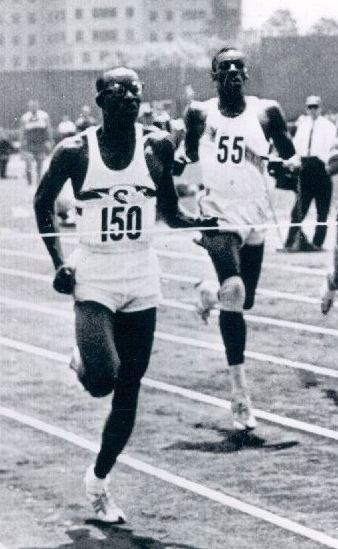
- Plummer (right) in 1961

Personal information
- Born: January 3, 1938 Brooklyn, U.S.
- Died: November 30, 2015 (aged 77) Denver, U.S.

Sport
- Sport: Athletics
- Events: 200 m, 400 m

Achievements and titles
- Personal bests: 200 m – 20.5 (1963); 400 m – 44.6 (1963)

Adolph Plummer (January 3, 1938 – November 30, 2015) was an American track and field athlete. He is best known for breaking the world record in the 440 yard dash in 1963, the last runner to hold the 400 m record with a time recorded for the longer 440 yards.

== Track career ==
During his time running at the University of New Mexico (UNM, 1959–1963), Plummer was a member of an outstanding Lobos track team. In 1961, Plummer became the NCAA champion in the 440 yards event. He was a three-time All-American and won four titles in the 440 yards event and three at 220 yards in the Skyline Conference and Western Athletic Conference (WAC).

On May 25, 1963, running in his last race for UNM at the WAC Championships in Tempe, Arizona, Plummer shocked future Olympic champion Ulis Williams on his home track with a 44.9 second world record in the 440 yards (Williams also broke the old world record by 0.1 second). Plummer shattered the old mark set by Glenn Davis five years previously by the huge margin of 8 tenths of a second. Plummer's only memory of the race was hearing the starter say "set" before the race began. Plummer's time also tied the existing world record in the shorter 400 meters (440 yards is 402.34 meters). This was the first ever 440 run under 45 seconds.

In 1964, Plummer attempted to qualify for the Olympic Games but trailed in his heat due to the flare-up of an arthritic knee, a condition that was to eventually end his athletics career.

In 1965, Plummer returned to the track specializing in the 220 yard/200 meter event. That year he became USA national champion at 220 yards and was ranked number one in the world at that distance.(See below).

== Accolades and awards ==
In 1976, Plummer was inducted into the New Mexico Sports Hall of Fame.

In 2012, Plummer was presented with a Living Legend Awards by the UNM Black Alumni Chapter.

Plummer has also been inducted into the UNM Alumni Lettermen's Association Hall of Honor.

== Personal life ==
Plummer was a native of Brooklyn, New York City and served in the United States Air Force before attending UNM.

After attending UNM, Plummer moved to Colorado and worked as an educator in the Denver public schools system.

In the mid-1970s (1974–76 in particular), Plummer's tenure as an educator at Cole Junior H.S., in Denver, coincided with the earliest days of Court-Ordered Busing for Integration. His involvement was instrumental in fostering tolerance – resulting in a successful, peaceful learning environment for Denver's suburban and urban students suddenly exposed to new cohorts and lifestyles and attitudes.

He also served for a time as an associate dean in the Athletic Department at UNM in charge of education.

Plummer died on November 30, 2015, in Denver at the age of 77.

== Track and field rankings ==
Plummer was ranked among the best in the US and the world in the 440 yard/400 meter sprint event in the period 1961–64 and the 220 yard/200 meter sprint event in the period 1963–1966, according to the votes of the experts of Track and Field News.

200 meters
Year	World rank	US rank
1963	6th	4th
1964	–	–
1965	1st	1st
1966	–	5th

400 meters
Year	World rank	US rank
1961	5th	3rd
1962	8th	4th
1963	2nd	2nd
1964	–	8th

== USA Championships ==
Plummer competed in the 220 yard/220 meter and 440 yard/400 meter events in the USA National Track and Field Championships between 1961 and 1966.

USA Championships
Year	220y	440y
1961	–	3rd
1962	–	5th
1963	–	2nd
1964	–	4th
1965	1st	–
1966	2nd	–
