= Ed Burke (hammer thrower) =

American hammer thrower

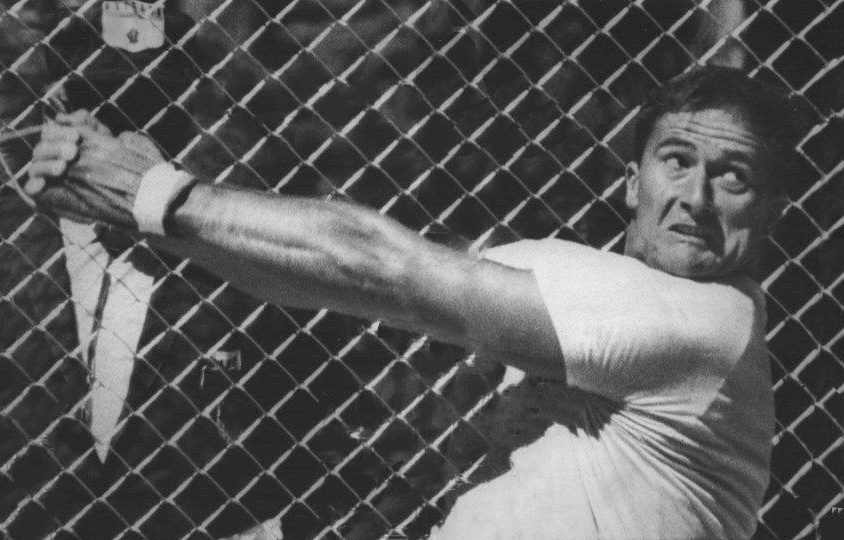
- Burke in 1968

Personal information
- Born: March 4, 1940 (age 86) Ukiah, California, U.S.
- Height: 185 cm (6 ft 1 in)
- Weight: 112 kg (247 lb)

Sport
- Sport: Athletics
- Event: Hammer throw
- Club: Accusplit Track Club

Achievements and titles
- Personal best: 74.34 m (1984)

Edward Andrew Burke (born March 4, 1940) is an American hammer thrower best known for carrying the flag of the United States at the Olympics in Los Angeles 1984. He competed at the 1964, 1968 and 1984 Olympics and placed 7th, 12th and 18th, respectively. He set his personal best in 1984, aged 44.

Burke won the British AAA Championships title at the 1967 AAA Championships.

Burke came to the 1968 Summer Olympics as a favorite, after setting the U.S. record of 235' 11" at the 1967 AAU Championships in Bakersfield, California (the same meet Jim Ryun ran his long standing 3:51.1 mile record), then the number two performance in history. After being (unjustly) called for a foul on his first two throws, he was so disappointed in his results that he retired from the sport following the Olympics. In 1979, he watched the World Cup on television with his daughters who had never seen their father throw. He marveled at the relatively small size of champion Sergei Litvinov (URS). Just shy of his 40th birthday, he decided to give the hammer one more whirl. After training, he made the United States team at the first IAAF World Championships, and achieved his lifetime best of 243' 11" in the process of qualifying for his third Olympics at age 44 (a feat his contemporary Al Oerter also attempted and failed that year). He was the first American to achieve qualifying for Olympic teams 20 years apart (since equaled by Francie Larrieu-Smith, also from the San Jose area, in 1992). Being the oldest member of the team and a remarkable story, he was selected to carry the flag, which he did with one hand, in the hometown Olympic Opening Ceremonies by the team captains.

That’s what I’m known for. It’s one of those quirks of fate. People can’t remember who won the gold medal, but they remember the guy who carried the flag into the stadium.”

Ed Burke attended college at San Jose State University.

One of his daughters appeared on Jeopardy! in December 2025.

== Promoting throwing ==
Following the Olympics, he again retired to tend the Los Gatos Athletic Club. He joined fellow Olympian, Discus Thrower Mac Wilkins in forming Explorer Post 813 in San Jose, California, dedicated to introducing boys and girls to the art of throwing. They constructed throwing cages next to Highway 85, enlisting the help of other world-class athletes training in the San Jose area. 30 graduates of their program have gone on to throw for NCAA Division I schools, two of them Dave Popejoy and Kevin McMahon made U.S. Olympic teams.

== Masters ==
21 years after his second retirement, Burke returned to competition in the 65-year-old division. and promptly set the world record for his age division. After turning 70 in 2010, he did it again in his new age division.

I like training, but I like training for a purpose. I don't really care how far I throw, I like the movement. It's a puzzle. It's been a puzzle my whole life.

== Achievements ==
Year	Competition	Venue	Position	Notes
Representing the United States
1983	World Championships	Helsinki, Finland	20th	69.12 m

Olympic Games
Preceded by Frank Masley	Flagbearer for United States; Los Angeles 1984	Succeeded by Lyle Nelson
