= Art Walker (triple jumper) =

American triple jumper

Arthur "Art" Walker
Personal information
- Nickname: Art
- Born: 9 September 1941 (age 84) Columbus, Georgia, United States
- Height: 1.88 m (6 ft 2 in)
- Weight: 69 kg (152 lb)

Sport
- Country: United States
- Sport: Athletics
- Event: Triple jump
- Club: Southern California Striders, Anaheim

Achievements and titles
- Personal bests: Triple jump: 17.12 m (56 ft 2 in) (1968); Long jump: 7.52 m (24 ft 8 in) (1964)

Arthur Franklin Walker (born 9 September 1941) is a retired American triple jumper, who participated at the Olympic Games in Mexico 1968 and Munich 1972.

Walker competed for the Morehouse Maroon Tigers track and field team in the NCAA.

He was the best American triple jumper in the end of the 1960s, won four consecutive Mt. San Antonio College titles (from 1965 to 1968), three national titles (1965, 1966, and 1968), and one indoor national title in 1967.

He took part at the 1965 Summer Universiade in Budapest, ending at 5th place.

Art Walker improved for three times the US record of triple jump, increasing it by more than one foot compared to the previous record. After winning three national championships, he lost by a whisker the bronze medal in the exciting triple jump event at 1968 Olympics in Mexico City, where despite a jump of 17.12 m (56 ft 2 in) - up to two days before the world record stood to 17.03 m (55 ft 10 1/4 in) - he ended only at the fourth place, behind the Italian jumper Giuseppe Gentile.

He took part also at the 1972 Summer Olympics in Munich, ending at 29th place.
