= Estelle Baskerville =

American high jumper

Personal information
- Born: November 15, 1946 (age 78) Columbus, Ohio, United States

Sport
- Sport: Athletics
- Event: High jump

Estelle Baskerville (born November 15, 1946) is an American athlete. She competed in the women's high jump at the 1964 Summer Olympics and the 1968 Summer Olympics.
