= Abebe Bikila Award =

Annual prize given by the New York Road Runners

- Presented by: New York Road Runners
- First award: 1978
- Website: www.nyrr.org

The Abebe Bikila Award is an annual prize given by the New York Road Runners club (NYRR) to honour individuals who have made a significant contribution to the sport of long-distance running. The first recipient of the award was Ted Corbitt, a founder of both NYRR and the Road Runners Club of America, who received the honour on October 27, 1978. The award is named in honour of the two-time Olympic marathon winner Abebe Bikila of Ethiopia.

Past winners of the award include: Olympic gold medallists Frank Shorter, Rosa Mota and Lasse Virén; world record breakers Paula Radcliffe, Khalid Khannouchi and Paul Tergat; and multiple major marathon winners Grete Waitz, Alberto Salazar and Joan Samuelson.

While the award has typically been associated with elite level runners, particularly marathon runners, it has also been given to non-athletes. Fred Lebow – creator of the New York Marathon – became the first person to win the award who was not a professional athlete in 1995. The 2001 award was given to Mayor of New York Rudy Giuliani on the basis of his dedication to the city in the aftermath of the September 11 attacks. The 2009 winner, long-time road running organiser and event director Allan Steinfeld, was the third non-professional athlete to receive the award. The Rudin family, long-time sponsors of the New York Marathon, were the first non-individual recipients of the award in 2012.

The award is closely linked with NYRR's annual International Friendship Run, a four-mile fun run from United Nations Plaza to Central Park, which is held immediately following the official award presentation event.

== Recipients ==
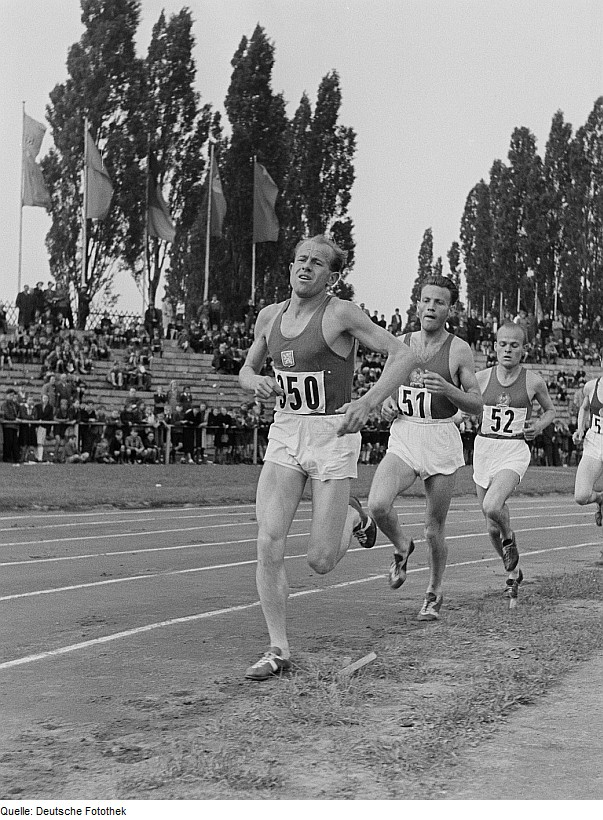
Czech runner Emil Zátopek was the first foreign winner.

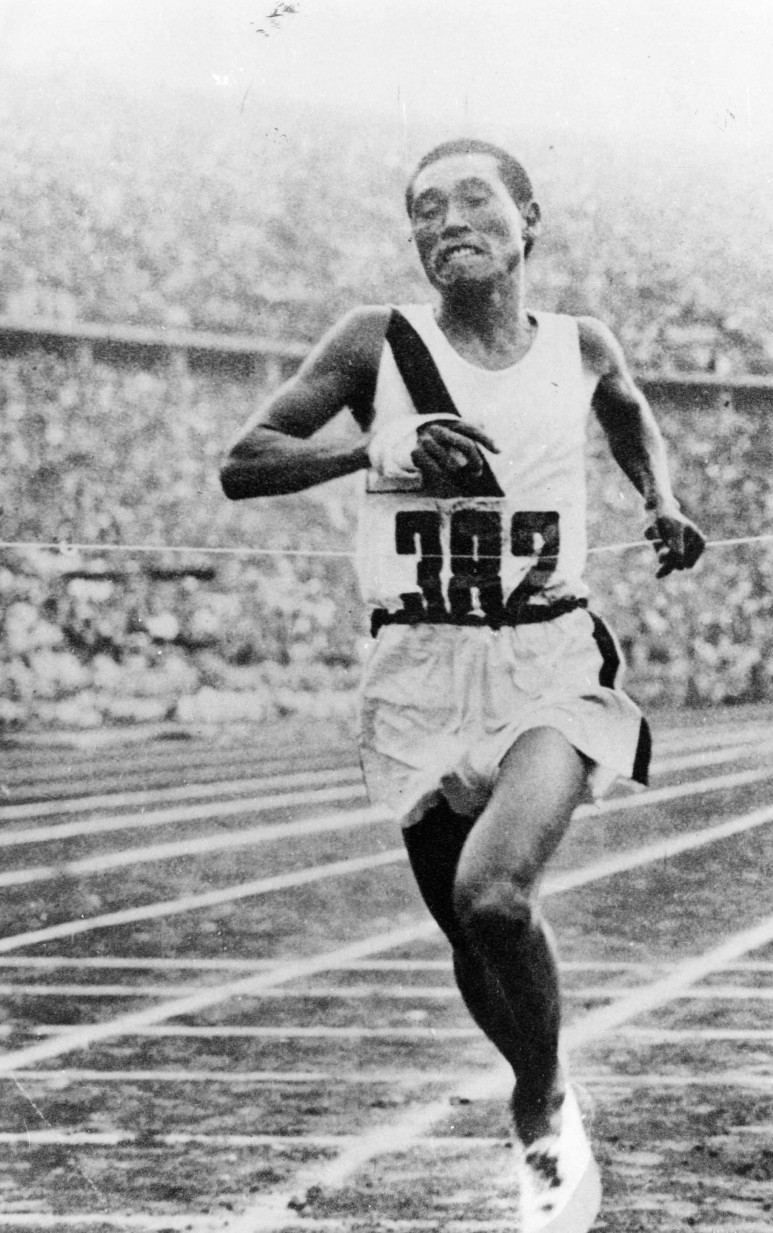
Olympic marathon winner Sohn Kee-chung of Korea was the first Asian to receive the prize.

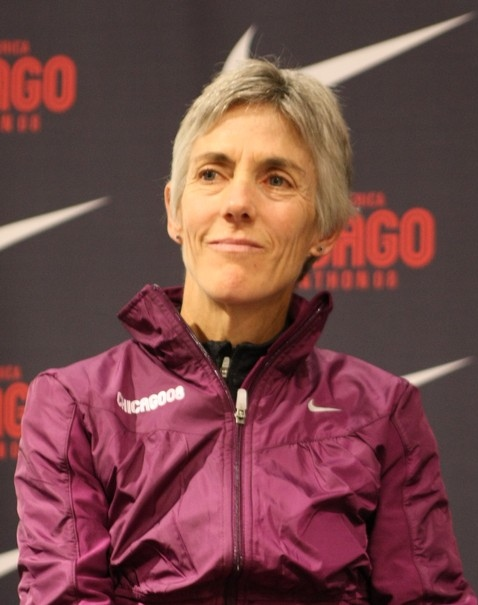
Joan Samuelson was the second female athlete to take the award.

Year	Recipient	Country
1978	Ted Corbitt	United States
1979	Emil Zátopek	Czechoslovakia
1980	Lasse Virén	Finland
1981	Frank Shorter	United States
1982	Mamo Wolde	Ethiopia
1983	Grete Waitz	Norway
1984	Derek Clayton	Australia
1985	John Adelbert Kelley	United States
1986	Joan Samuelson	United States
1987	Sohn Kee-chung	South Korea
1988	Alberto Salazar	United States
1989	Bill Rodgers	United States
1990	Waldemar Cierpinski	Germany
1991	Alain Mimoun	France
1992	Ingrid Kristiansen	Norway
1993	Rod Dixon	New Zealand
1994	Juma Ikangaa	Tanzania
1995	Fred Lebow	United States
1996	Orlando Pizzolato	Italy
1997	Lisa Ondieki	Australia
1998	Rosa Mota	Portugal
1999	Tegla Loroupe	Kenya
2000	Khalid Khannouchi	United States
2001	Rudolph Giuliani	United States
2002	Allison Roe	New Zealand
2003	Kathrine Switzer	United States
2004	Stefano Baldini	Italy
2005	Mizuki Noguchi	Japan
2006	Paula Radcliffe	United Kingdom
2007	Not awarded	
2008	Lornah Kiplagat	Netherlands
2009	Allan Steinfeld	United States
2010	Paul Tergat	Kenya
2011	Germán Silva	Mexico
2012	Not awarded	
2013	Rudin family	United States
2014	Norbert Sander	United States
2015	Haile Gebrselassie	Ethiopia
2016	Mary Wittenberg	United States
2017	Meb Keflezighi	United States
2018	Deena Kastor	United States
2019	Jenny Simpson	United States
2020	Not awarded	
2021	Eliud Kipchoge	Kenya
2022	Nina Kuscsik	United States
2023	Patti Catalano	United States
