= Allan Steinfeld =

Sports administrator

Allan Steinfeld (June 7, 1946 — January 24, 2017) was the president of the New York Road Runners and race director of the New York City Marathon from 1994 to 2005. During his executive career, Steinfeld was also the technical director of the New York City Marathon and the NYRR's chief executive officer during the 1980s. In 2009, Steinfeld received the Abebe Bikila Award from the NYRR. Outside of the NYRR, Steinfeld was a co-establisher of the Association of International Marathons and Distance Races in 1982.

In individual events, Steinfeld directed races held as part of the IAAF Grand Prix between 1989 and 1995. Outside of New York, Steinfeld led the 1984 IAAF World Cross Country Championships, 1998 Goodwill Games and the 2002 USA Track & Field Indoor Championships. Apart from his directorship career, Steinfeld did not complete the 1966 Boston Marathon and was a referee for the marathons at the 1984 Summer Olympics. He was inducted into the RRCA Distance Running Hall of Fame in 2013 and the New York Road Runners Hall of Fame in 2014.

== Early life and education ==
On June 7, 1946, Steinfeld was born in Manhattan, New York City. His mother was a dressmaker while his father was a trader. During his childhood, Steinfeld lived in the Bronx and completed his education in Brooklyn. For his post-secondary education, Steinfeld began running at Hunter College before he moved to The City College of New York.

At City College, Steinfeld competed in running categories ranging from the 220 yards to 1 mile and graduated in 1969 with an electrical engineering bachelor's degree. In 1971, Steinfeld received a master's degree at Cornell University with a dual major of radio astronomy and electrical engineering. Upon completing his degree at Cornell, Steinfeld started a doctor's degree at the University of Alaska Fairbanks. While in Alaska for a year, Steinfeld conducted research on the Northern Lights for his dissertation and took up cross country running. After he withdrew from his studies in Alaska, Steinfeld went to Richmond College in 1972 to become a certified teacher.

== Career ==
As an athlete, Steinfeld did not finish the 1966 Boston Marathon and was in the top 900 at the 1979 Honolulu Marathon. Apart from running, Steinfeld held multiple volunteer positions for the New York Road Runners from 1963 to 1978. During this time period, Steinfeld became an assistant athletic coach and academic teacher in 1973 for a Rye Neck, New York high school. Steinfeld continued to teach in Rye Neck until he became Fred Lebow's assistant at the NYRR in 1978.

During the 1980s, Steinfeld was the chief executive officer of the NYRR while also becoming the technical director of the New York City Marathon in 1983. After Lebow died in 1994, Steinfeld became the NYRR's president and the New York City Marathon race director that year. In 2005, Steinfeld stepped down from his executive roles to become the New York City Marathon's executive director and the NYRR's vice-chairperson. Outside of the NYRR, Steinfeld co-established the Association of International Marathons and Distance Races in 1982 and was the organization's inaugural technical chairperson.

In individual events, Steinfeld was the director of events held in New York City as part of the IAAF Grand Prix between 1989 and 1995. During this time period, Steindfeld was in charge of races held during the New York Games from 1989 to 1994. Outside of New York, Steinfeld was a referee at the marathons held during the 1984 Summer Olympics and was in charge of the 1984 IAAF World Cross Country Championships. Other racing events Steinfeld directed were the 1998 Goodwill Games and the 2002 USA Track & Field Indoor Championships.

== Awards and honors ==
In 2009, Steinfeld received the Abebe Bikila Award from the NYRR. For hall of fames, Steinfeld was inducted into the RRCA Distance Running Hall of Fame in 2013 and the New York Road Runners Hall of Fame in 2014.

== Personal life and death ==
After experiencing an injury to his retina while in Alaska during the early 1970s, Steinfeld later became blind in his left eye. On January 24, 2017, Steinfeld died in Allentown, Pennsylvania from multiple system atrophy.
