= New York Mini 10K =

Road running competition

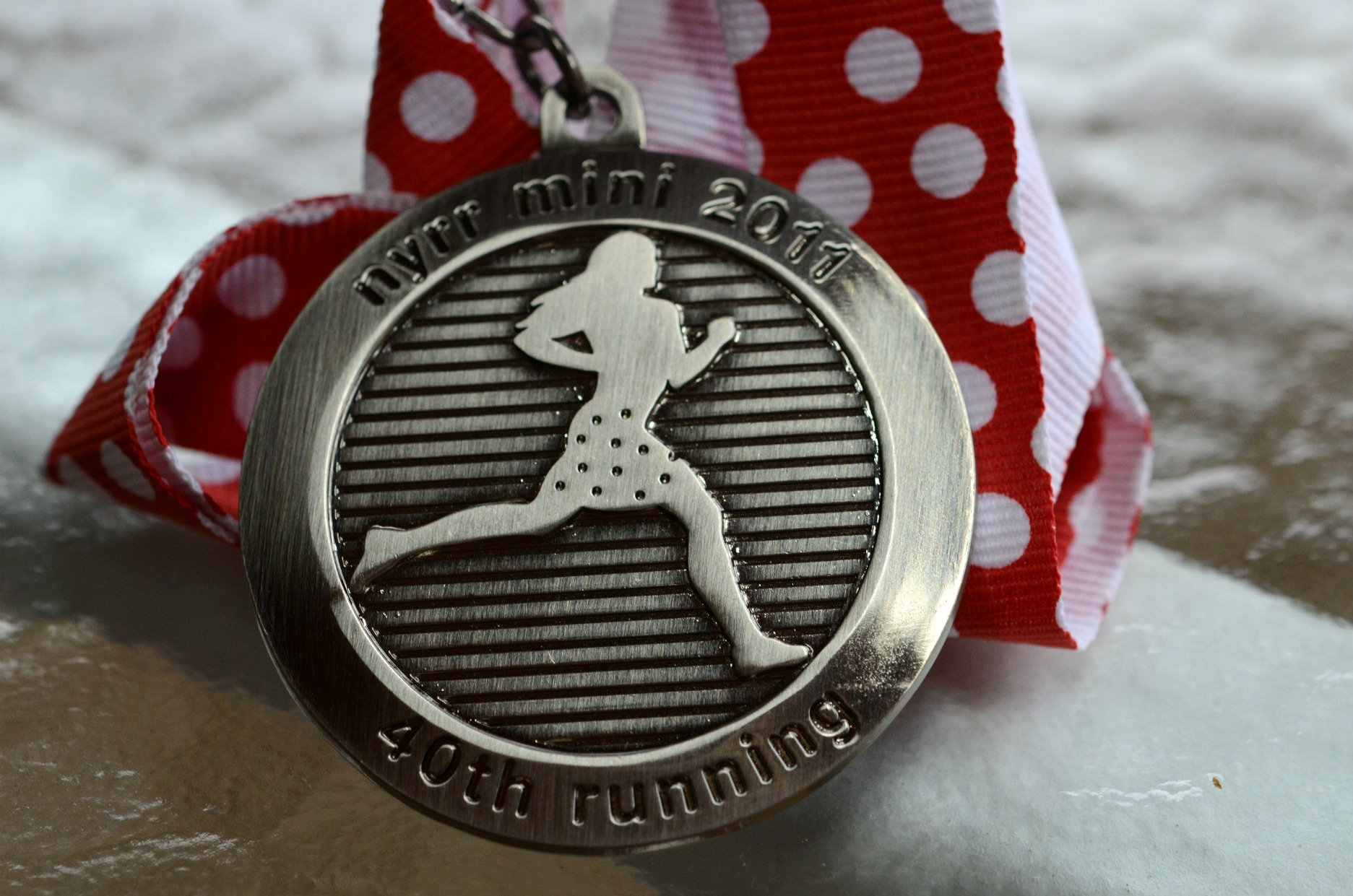
- New York Mini Finisher's Medal from 2011 emphasizing race namesake
- Date: Early June
- Location: New York City, New York, United States
- Event type: Road
- Distance: 10 kilometres
- Primary sponsor: Mastercard
- Established: 1972
- Course records: 30:07 (2026) (Kenya) Agnes Ngetich
- Website: Official website

The Mastercard New York Mini 10K is an annual 10-kilometer road running competition for women that takes place in Central Park, New York City, in the United States. The race has been organised by New York Road Runners since 1972. The competition has both an elite-level race and a fun run, both of which accounted for a total of 9,977 finishers in 2025.

The idea of a 10K women's race was the joint vision of elite runners Nina Kuscsik and Kathrine Switzer, and New York City Marathon co-director Fred Lebow – in the early 1970s, there was a dearth of women's road racing competitions. The race's inaugural sponsor Johnson Wax (who were promoting a women's shaving gel called Crazylegs) suggested a full marathon event (26 miles and 385 yards), but it was decided that a more manageable "mini marathon" race over 6 miles would be held. A total of 78 runners took part in the race, which was the world's first women-only road racing competition.

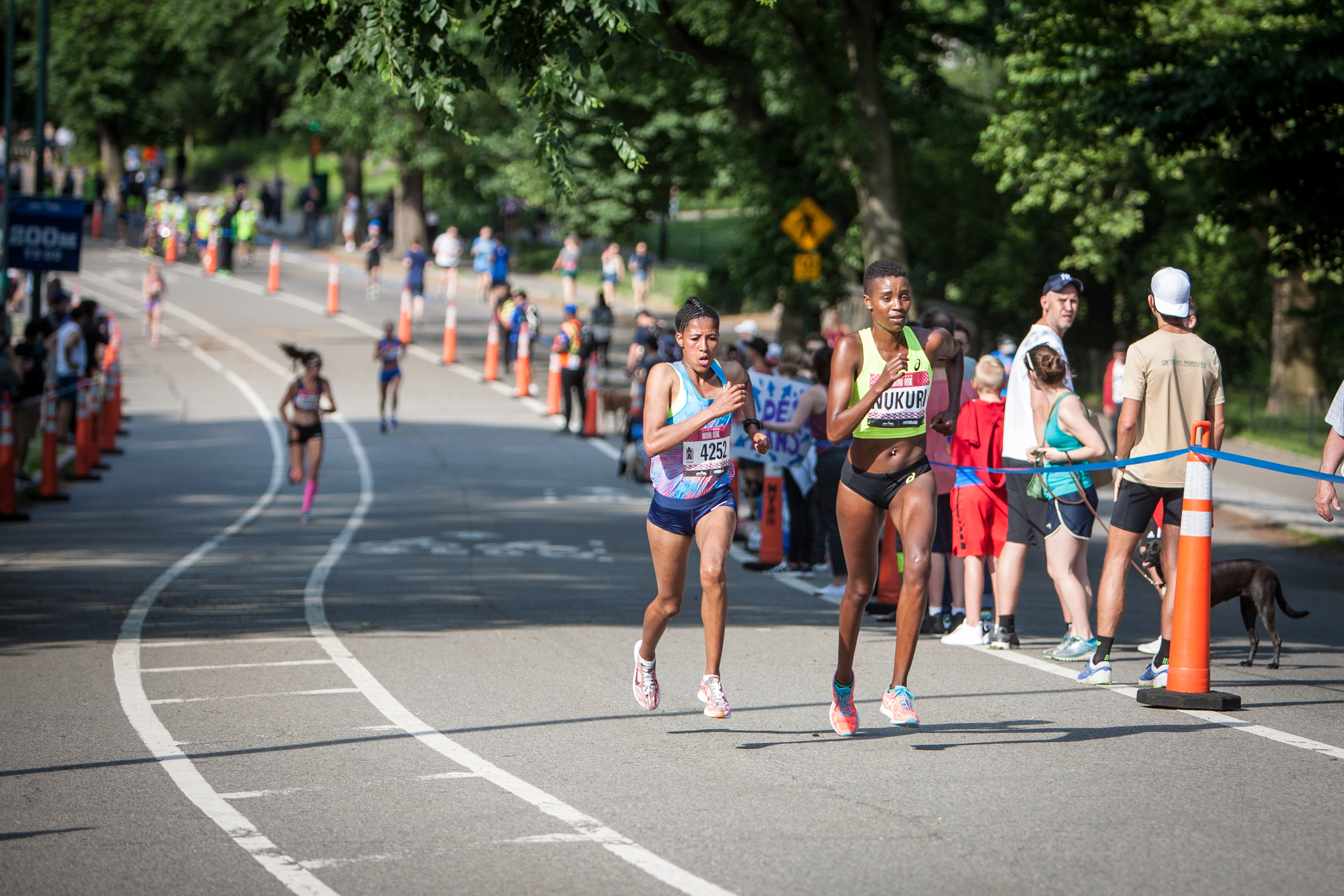
Elite women racing through Central Park in the 2018 edition

The course of the road race begins near 61st Street on Central Park West and heads north, entering Central Park at West 90th Street. The route loops in a clockwise direction, turning southwards at Harlem Meer around the 3-mile (5-kilometre) mark. It continues south past the Central Park Reservoir and the Guggenheim Museum. Runners continue southwards until they come towards the park's limits near Wollman Rink at which point it heads to the west and turns north to the finishing point near the Tavern on the Green and Sheep Meadow.

The course record is held by Agnes Ngetich of Kenya, who finished in 30:07 to win the 2026 edition and beat the previous course record of 30:12 set by Senbere Teferi of Ethiopia in 2023. Grete Waitz and Tegla Loroupe are the race's most successful athletes, with both of them having each won the race on five occasions. Following her death in 2011, the 40th edition of the race was dedicated to Waitz.

== Past winners ==
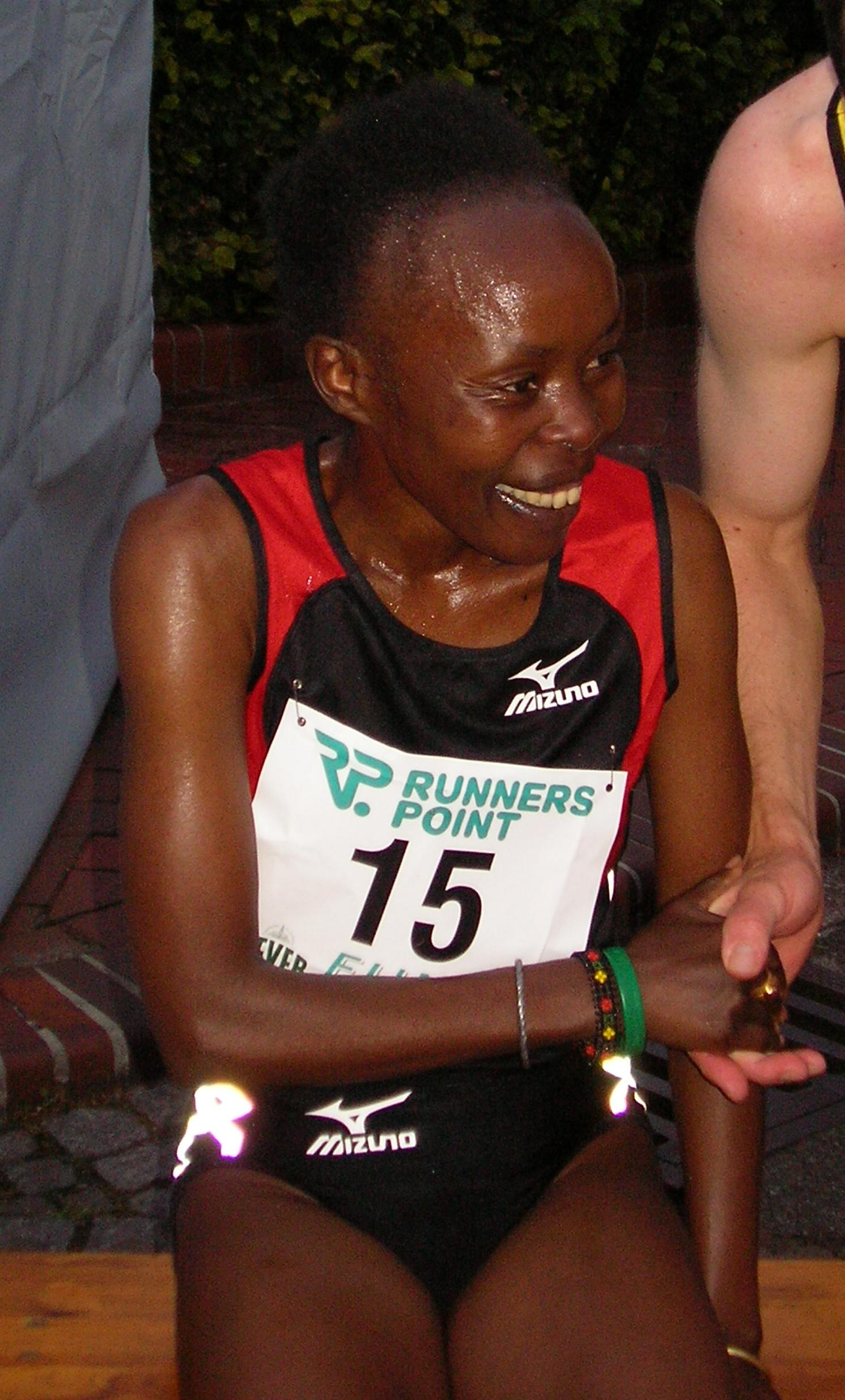
Kenyan runner Tegla Loroupe is a five-time winner of the race.

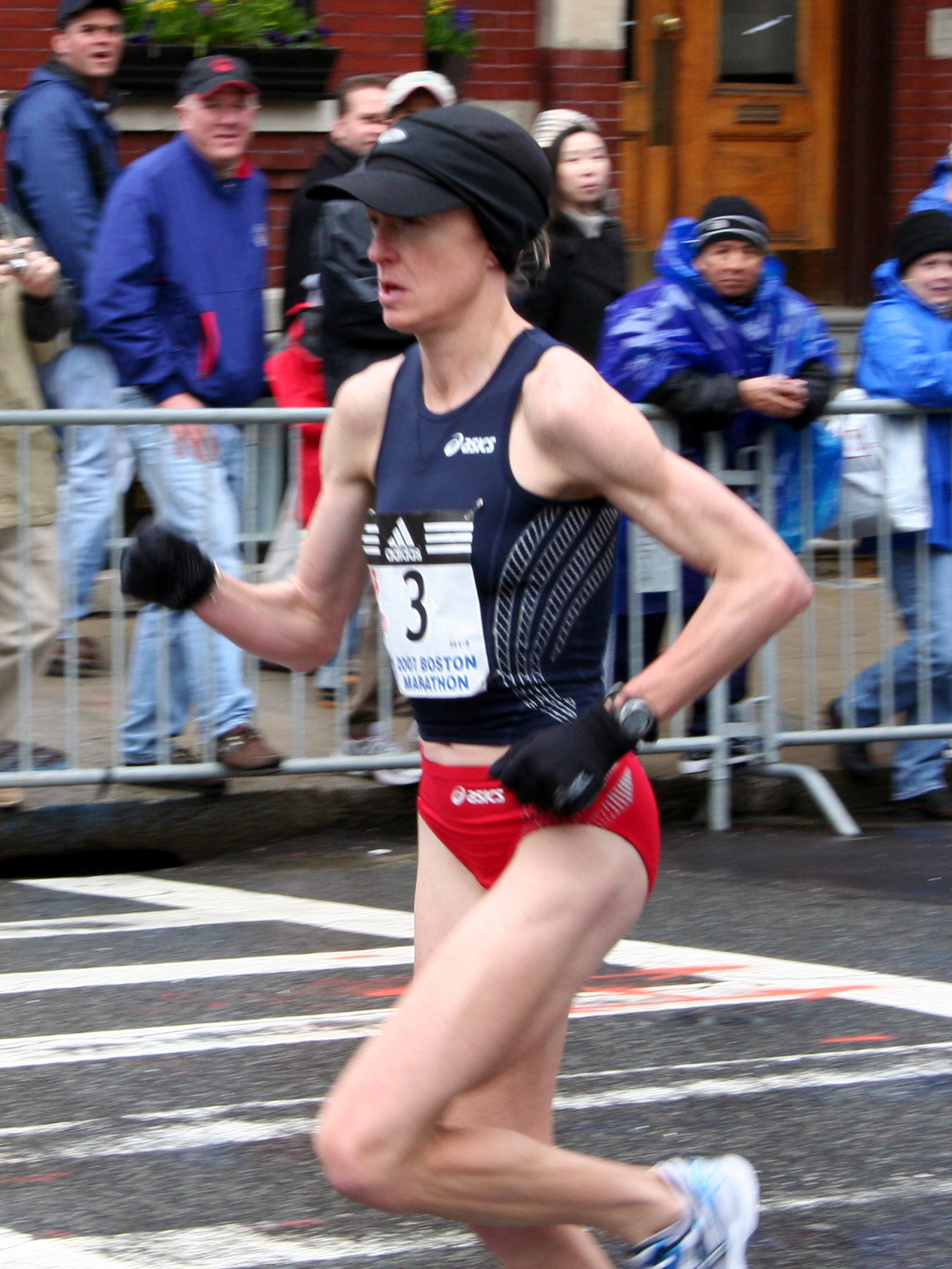
Deena Kastor was the last American to win the competition in 2004 when the event was limited to American entries only, until Molly Huddle won in 2014.

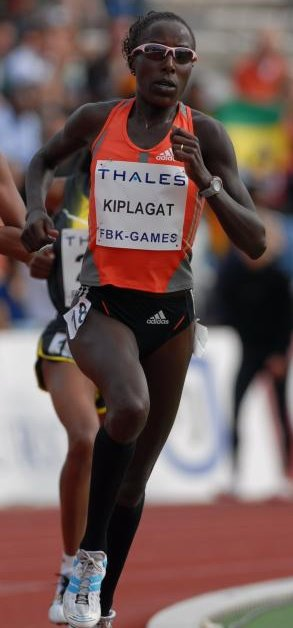
Kenyan-Dutch runner Lornah Kiplagat won three times consecutively between 2005 and 2007.

Key: Course record Six-mile course Short course

Edition	Year	Winner	Time (m:s)
1st	1972	Jacqueline Dixon (USA)	37:01.7
2nd	1973	Katherine Schrader (USA)	36:48.7
3rd	1974	Doreen Ennis (USA)	36:46
4th	1975	Charlotte Lettis (USA)	35:57
5th	1976	Julie Shea (USA)	35:05
6th	1977	Peg Neppel (USA)	34:15
7th	1978	Martha White (USA)	33:29
8th	1979	Grete Waitz (NOR)	31:15.4
9th	1980	Grete Waitz (NOR)	30:59.8
10th	1981	Grete Waitz (NOR)	32:43.1
11th	1982	Grete Waitz (NOR)	31:59.2
12th	1983	Anne Audain (NZL)	32:23
13th	1984	Grete Waitz (NOR)	31:53
14th	1985	Francie Larrieu Smith (USA)	32:23
15th	1986	Ingrid Kristiansen (NOR)	31:45
16th	1987	Lisa Ondieki (AUS)	32:49
17th	1988	Ingrid Kristiansen (NOR)	31:31
18th	1989	Lynn Williams (CAN)	32:09
19th	1990	Judi St. Hilaire (USA)	32:36
20th	1991	Delilah Asiago (KEN)	32:24
21st	1992	Liz McColgan (GBR)	31:41
22nd	1993	Tegla Loroupe (KEN)	32:31
23rd	1994	Anne Marie Lauck (USA)	31:52
24th	1995	Delilah Asiago (KEN)	31:22
25th	1996	Tegla Loroupe (KEN)	32:13
26th	1997	Tegla Loroupe (KEN)	31:45
27th	1998	Kimberly Griffin (USA)	35:26
28th	1999	Tegla Loroupe (KEN)	31:48
29th	2000	Tegla Loroupe (KEN)	31:37
30th	2001	Paula Radcliffe (GBR)	30:47
31st	2002	Asmae Leghzaoui (MAR)	30:28.6
32nd	2003	Lornah Kiplagat (KEN)	31:13
33rd	2004	Deena Kastor (USA)	31:44
34th	2005	Lornah Kiplagat (NED)	31:43.7
35th	2006	Lornah Kiplagat (NED)	31:26.7
36th	2007	Lornah Kiplagat (NED)	32:10
37th	2008	Hilda Kibet (NED)	32:42.6
38th	2009	Rose Kosgei (KEN)	32:43
39th	2010	Linet Masai (KEN)	30:48
40th	2011	Linet Masai (KEN)	31:40
41st	2012	Edna Kiplagat (KEN)	32:08
42nd	2013	Mamitu Daska (ETH)	31:47
43rd	2014	Molly Huddle (USA)	31:37
44th	2015	Mary Keitany (KEN)	31:15
45th	2016	Jemima Sumgong (KEN)	31:26
46th	2017	Mary Keitany (KEN)	31:20
47th	2018	Mary Keitany (KEN)	30:59
48th	2019	Sara Hall (USA)	32:27
N/A	2020	Cancelled (COVID-19 pandemic)	
49th	2021	Sara Hall (USA)	31:33
50th	2022	Senbere Teferi (ETH)	30:43
51st	2023	Senbere Teferi (ETH)	30:12
52nd	2024	Senbere Teferi (ETH)	30:47
53rd	2025	Hellen Obiri (KEN)	30:44
54th	2026	Agnes Ngetich (KEN)	30:07

== Statistics ==
=== Winners by country ===
Country	Total
Kenya	18
United States	15
Norway	7
Netherlands	4
Ethiopia	3
United Kingdom	2
Australia	1
Canada	1
Morocco	1
New Zealand	1

=== Multiple winners ===
Athlete	Country	Wins	Years
Grete Waitz	Norway	5	1979–82, 1984
Tegla Loroupe	Kenya	5	1993, 1996, 1997, 1999, 2000
Lornah Kiplagat	Kenya & Netherlands	4	2003, 2005–07
Mary Keitany	Kenya	3	2015, 2017–18
Ingrid Kristiansen	Norway	2	1986, 1988
Delilah Asiago	Kenya	2	1991, 1995
Sara Hall	United States	2	2019, 2021
Senbere Teferi	Ethiopia	2	2022, 2023
