= National Distance Running Hall of Fame =

Closed hall of fame in Utica, NY, USA

The National Distance Running Hall of Fame was a hall of fame in Utica, New York dedicated to the sport of distance running. It was established on July 11, 1998.

In 1999, the Hall of Fame moved into a building in downtown Utica, with mayor Ed Hanna providing financial assistance. It moved to a building near the finish line of the Boilermaker Road Race in 2013. In the 2020s, the Hall of Fame closed permanently. Its building is now offices for the Boilermaker Road Race.

== Members ==
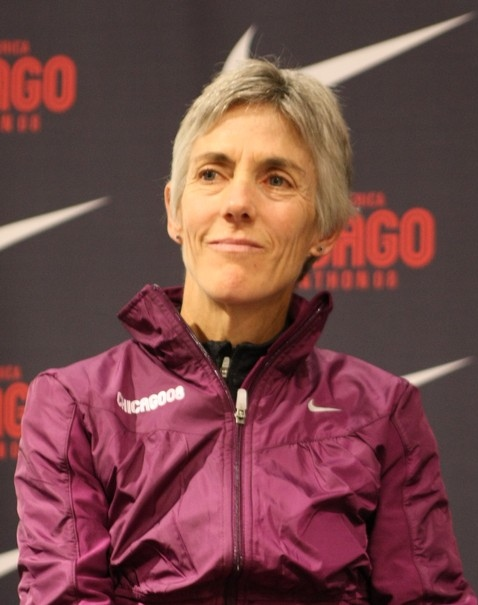
Joan Benoit prior to the 2008 Chicago Marathon.

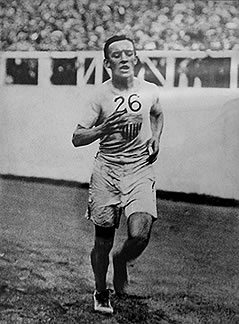
Johnny Hayes running at the 1908 Summer Olympics.

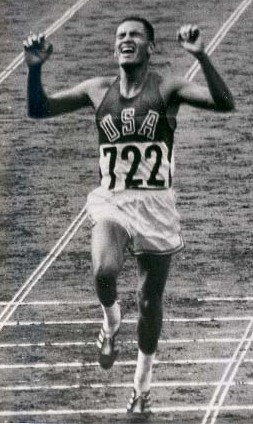
Olympian Billy Mills

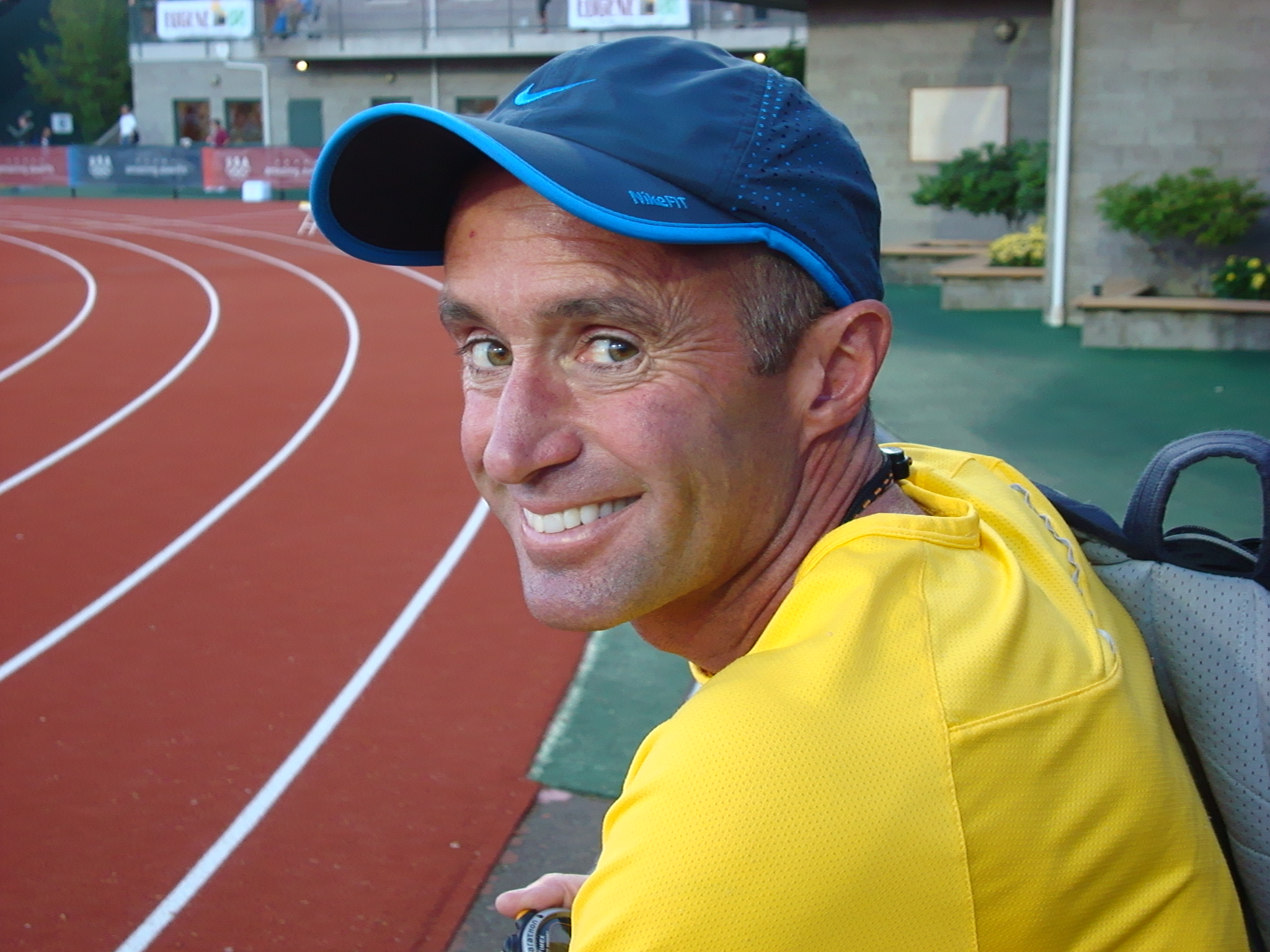
Alberto Salazar

	Key
†	Denotes a posthumous induction

Inductee	Year inducted
Horace Ashenfelter	2012
Dick Beardsley	2010
Joan Benoit	1998
Bill Bowerman^{†}	2002
Doris Brown Heritage	2002
Amby Burfoot	2008
Patti Catalano Dillon	2006
Ted Corbitt	1998
Glenn Cunningham^{†}	2012
Mary Decker	2003
Bill Dellinger	2001
Clarence DeMar^{†}	2000
Tom Fleming	2014
Miki Gorman	2010
Jacqueline Hansen	2012
Johnny Hayes^{†}	2008
Lynn Jennings	2001
Don Kardong	2005
Johnny Kelley	1999
John J. Kelley	2002
Nina Kuscsik	1999
Francie Larrieu-Smith	1999
Fred Lebow^{†}	2001
Gerry Lindgren	2006
Marty Liquori	2006
Kim Merritt	2014
Greg Meyer	2005
Billy Mills	1999
Steve Prefontaine^{†}	2000
Bill Rodgers	1998
H. Browning Ross^{†}	2002
Jim Ryun	2003
Alberto Salazar	2000
Bob Schul	2005
Frank Shorter	1998
Kathrine Switzer	1998
Craig Virgin	2001
Grete Waitz	2000
Fred Wilt^{†}	2010
Priscilla Welch	2008
George Young	2003

== See also ==
- RRCA Distance Running Hall of Fame
- USATF Masters Hall of Fame
