= New York Pioneer Club =

Running club in New York, United States

The New York Pioneer Club was a running club founded in 1936 in Harlem by businessmen Robert Douglas, William Culbreath, and Joseph J. Yancey. It was founded as a track club for runners in Harlem who did not have the funds or expertise to join other running clubs in the city. In 1942 the club began to admit white athletes; its revised constitution then said, “The objects of this organization are to support, encourage, and advance athletics among the youth of the Metropolitan District, regardless of Race, Color, or Creed.” Among its members were the Olympic marathoner and founding New York Road Runners president Ted Corbitt, who joined in 1947.

The inclusivity of the New York Pioneer Club, which accepted both ordinary and elite athletes, is credited as contributing to the inclusive ethos of road running today. Club membership dwindled after the death of co-founder Joe Yancey, and the club ceased to exist in the early 2000s.
