= Rob Simmelkjaer =

American journalist

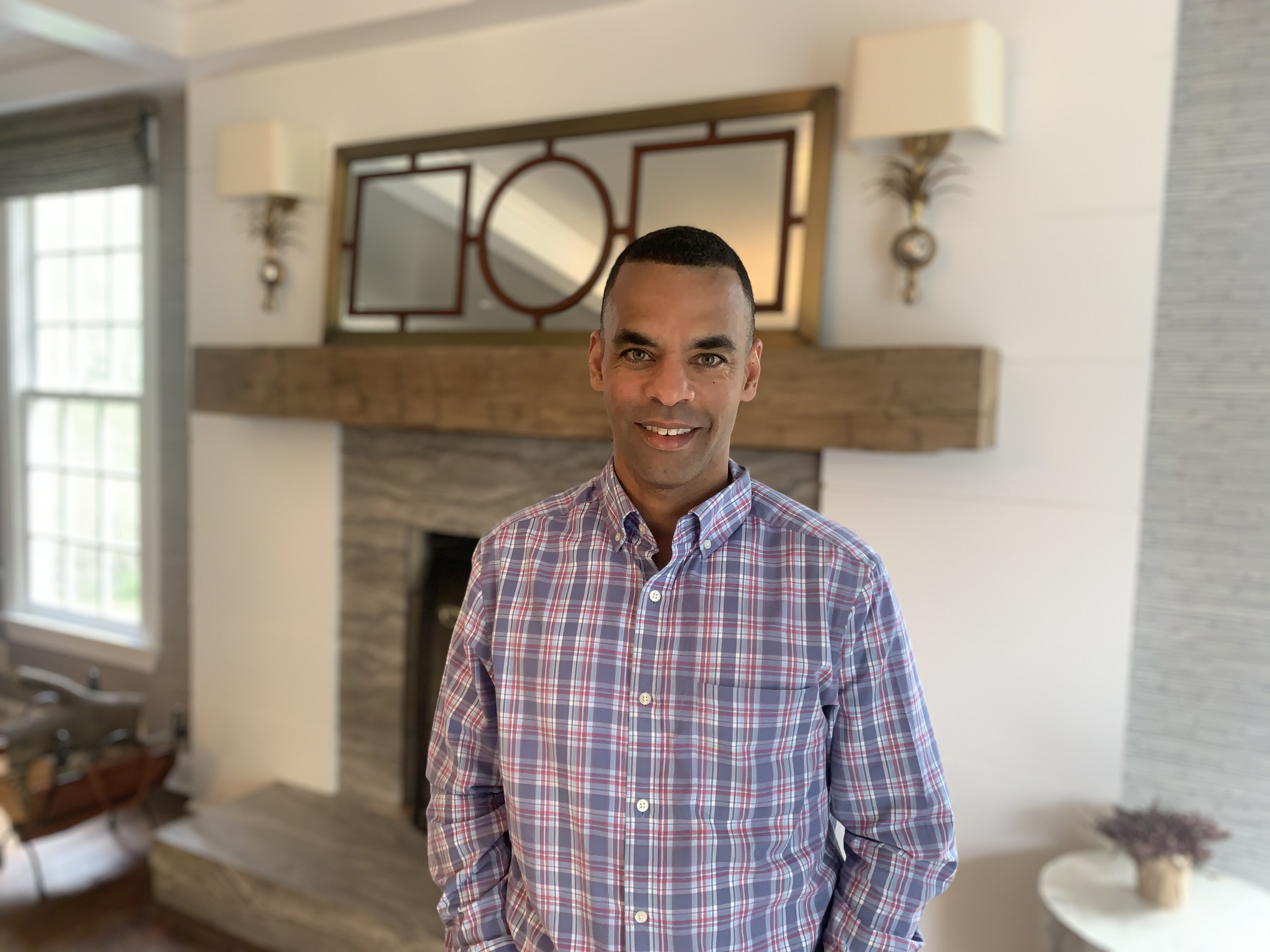
Rob Simmelkjaer

Rob Simmelkjaer is an American television executive, journalist, entrepreneur, and is the CEO of New York Road Runners. He served as a senior executive and on-air journalist at ESPN, ABC News and NBC Sports. In 2020 he founded a digital video interview platform called Persona. He also has served as Chairman of the Board of the Connecticut Lottery corporation since 2020 (nominated by Gov. Ned Lamont).

== Executive roles ==
=== New York Road Runners ===
In December 2022, Simmelkjaer became the CEO of New York Road Runners.

=== NBC Sports ===
On September 12, 2011, Simmelkjaer was named Senior Vice President, NBC Sports Ventures, where he was charged with leading international business development for the NBC Sports Group, including Golf Channel, NBC Sports, NBC Sports Radio and other businesses, and oversees the Group's stake in Universal Sports. He is also responsible for managing the NBC Sports Ventures unit, a collection of NBC owned businesses.

=== ESPN/ABC ===
Prior to joining NBC, Simmelkjaer served as ESPN's Vice President of International Development and Corporate Projects. In that role Simmelkjaer managed all international development and corporate projects for the network, including ESPN's family of international television channels, radio outlets and publishing interests. Simmelkjaer also managed the networks relationship with the International Olympic Committee.

From 2003 to 2006, Simmelkjaer worked at ESPN as Assistant to the President. In that position he assisted George Bodenheimer in matters of strategic direction and management. Simmelkjaer joined ESPN in 2002, as the director of programming and acquisitions. In that role he was the primary figure responsible for the launch of a six-year programming agreement between ESPN/ABC and the NBA.

== On-air roles ==
=== ABC News ===
Simmelkjaer served as an anchor and correspondent for ABC News Now from December 2005 to July 2007, and was the host of such original programs as, Inside the Newsroom, In the Mix and Guilt or Innocence.

=== ESPN ===
Simmelkjaer returned to ESPN in 2007, and served as a sideline reporter for ESPN College Football during the 2007 college football season.

=== NBC Sports ===
Simmelkjaer anchored MSNBC's coverage of the 2012 and 2016 Summer Olympics

=== Tennis Channel ===
Simmelkjaer began as part-time studio host of TC Live on Tennis Channel in July 2021.

== Education and early career ==
Prior to his tenure at ESPN, Simmelkjaer practiced law at two New York firms, Weil, Gotshal and Manges from 2000 to 2001, and Cravath, Swaine & Moore from 1997 to 2000.

Simmelkjaer is a graduate of Dartmouth College and Harvard Law School. At Dartmouth, Simmelkjaer anchored the Dartmouth sports radio for four years as well as Dartmouth radio's award-winning coverage of the 1992 presidential election. Upon graduation, he was awarded the Alexander Nagle award for excellence in broadcast journalism.
