= Browning Ross =

American middle and long-distance runner, steeplechaser

Medal record

Men's athletics

Representing the United States

Pan American Games
Gold medal – first place	1951 Buenos Aires	1500 metres
Silver medal – second place	1951 Buenos Aires	3000 m steeplechase

Harris Browning 'Brownie' Ross (April 26, 1924 – April 27, 1998) is often referred to as the father of long-distance running in the United States.

== Early years ==
Nicknamed "Brownie" by his friends, he was a lifelong resident of Woodbury, New Jersey from his birth until his death. He devoted his life to spreading his love and enthusiasm for long-distance running and is often credited as a cornerstone to the development of long-distance runners in the U.S.

=== High school ===
Ross did not grow up possessing a love for running. It was not until he was cut from Woodbury High School's baseball team that he took up running. In the spring of 1943, his senior year, he was crowned the New Jersey State Mile Champion and National Interscholastic Indoor Mile Champion.

=== World War II ===
Ross joined the Navy and fought in World War II. Upon discharge several years later, he was discovered by Villanova University track coach Jim "Jumbo" Elliott and awarded a scholarship after a victory in a two-mile race at Madison Square Garden.

== Villanova University ==
Ross was one of Elliott's first magnificent runners at Villanova University during the late 1940s. In 1948, he won the NCAA steeplechase championship, which paved the way for his position on the USA team in the 1948 Summer Olympics.

== International competition ==
=== 1948 and 1952 Olympics ===
Ross competed in the 1948 London Olympics where he became the only American to compete in the steeplechase final, placing 7th overall with a 9:23.2 time. After the Olympics were over Ross decided to stay in Europe and postpone his return trip to the United States because he wanted to compete in road races held in Ireland. It was there that he discovered a vast resource of running talent, and when Ross returned home he promptly alerted "Jumbo" of his findings. Elliott heeded his advice, and thus began Villanova's tradition with its long line of Irish runners.

Ross, however, did not match the same success in the 1952 Olympics held in Helsinki, Finland. He qualified to compete but never reached the finals in any competition.

=== 1951 Pan American Games ===
At the 1951 Pan American Games, Ross placed 1st in the 1500 meter run, shared 1st in the 3000 meter steeplechase, and finished 4th in the 5000 meter run. A controversy occurred in the 3000m steeplechase, where two Americans, Curt Stone and Ross, had pulled away from the field. Stone slowed down on the last straightaway and held Ross's hand as they crossed the line together. Argentine officials debated for two hours whether their actions violated rules requiring athletes to make an effort to win before finally allowing the results to stand, ranking Stone as first after a close examination of the finish photo.

== Long Distance Log ==
With such passion for the sport he loved it was inevitable that Ross would continue to stay involved even after his heyday of running. In 1955 he recognized the need for distance running results to be published and widely distributed in order to increase the public's awareness of the sport. In 1956 he created the Long Distance Log (after its inspiration, Distance Running Journal, created by Austin Scott in 1953) at the time the only publication devoted exclusively to long-distance running in the USA. The first issues were mimeographed on the backs of recycled high school history tests. The Log would become the major instrument to unite runners and address their concerns over the next 20 years. He was the first editor-in-chief of the magazine, which mailed monthly to about 1,000 subscribers throughout the country until 1975.

In 1958 Ross founded the Middle Atlantic Road Runners Club, centered in Philadelphia, which a year later became the national Road Runners Club of America. The club today boasts of more than 180,000 members nationwide. On Jan 27, 1968 Browning Ross (43) ran a 4:45.0 Masters American indoor mile record at the Cornell Invitational.

== Accomplishments, awards, and recognition ==
Sources

- Won 8 National AAU Cross Country Championships.
- Won the prestigious Berwick (PA) Marathon 10 times.
- Two-time Olympic runner, even reaching the finals in his first Olympic appearance and finishing seventh overall.
- Gold medal winner at the Pan-Am Games.
- Was first U.S. Cross Country team manager.
- Received the first Annual Long Distance AAU Award in 1969.
- Chairman of the National AAU long-distance and road-running committee from 1968 to 1971
- Elected to the National Distance Running, Villanova University, Gloucester County and Woodbury High School Halls of Fame.
- Former coach (Woodrow Wilson High School, Gloucester Catholic High School and Rutgers University), meet and race organizer, publisher, track official and sporting goods entrepreneur in the world of long-distance running.
- Two races are held in his name. The Benjamin/Ross 5k is held in June in his hometown of Woodbury, New Jersey and the Ross Kupcha 5k and kids run held in National Park, New Jersey on Easter Saturday.
- An H. Browning Ross Memorial was dedicated on July 4, 2001 at the bottom of Wood Street overlooking the Woodbury High School stadium and track.
- The H. Browning Ross Award was established in his memory by the Road Runners Club of America to acknowledge one individual each year who reflects the spirit of that organization.

== See also ==
- Runner's World, magazine started in 1966 by Bob Anderson, originally named Distance Running News, which was similar to Ross's Long Distance Log at the time
