= Ted Corbitt =

American long-distance runner and running organization official

- Corbitt, bib number 999, running in the marathon at the 1952 Summer Olympics in Helsinki, Finland

Personal information
- Born: January 31, 1919 Dunbarton, South Carolina
- Died: December 12, 2007 (aged 88) Houston, Texas
- Education: New York University
- Occupation: Physical Therapist

Sport
- Sport: Long distance running
- Club: New York Road Runners

Achievements and titles
- Olympic finals: Marathon, 44th place

Ted Corbitt (January 31, 1919 – December 12, 2007) was an American long-distance runner. The first African-American to run the marathon at the Summer Olympics (the 1952 Olympics in Helsinki, Finland) and the founding president of New York Road Runners, Corbitt is often called "the father of American long distance running." He was also an ultramarathon pioneer, helping to revive interest in the sport in the United States in the 1960s and 1970s. New York Times columnist Robert Lipsyte called Corbitt a "spiritual elder of the modern running clan". In a Runner's World feature honoring lifetime achievement, writer Gail Kislevitz called Corbitt a "symbol of durability and longevity". Corbitt was among the first five runners to be inducted into the National Distance Running Hall of Fame, and the first to be inducted into the American Ultrarunning Hall of Fame.

== Personal and professional life ==
The grandson of slaves, Corbitt was born on a cotton farm near Dunbarton, South Carolina. He graduated from Woodward High School in 1938 and attended the University of Cincinnati, where he received a bachelor's degree in education in 1942. He ran shorter track events in high school and college. Due to the racial discrimination common at the time, he was sometimes banned from track meets when white athletes refused to compete against him, nor was he sometimes able to stay in the same lodgings while traveling to competitions, even in the South during the 1950s. After army service in World War II, Corbitt earned a graduate degree in physical therapy on the G.I. Bill from New York University, where he later lectured. He also taught at Columbia University for several years. He was a physiotherapist for more than 40 years, and served as the chief physical therapist at the International Center for the Disabled.

== Racing and training ==
Corbitt joined the nation's first integrated running organization, the New York Pioneer Club, in 1947. In 1951, he completed his first of 22 Boston Marathons, in 2:48.42. He competed in the Marathon at the 1952 Summer Olympics in Helsinki. In January 1954, he won the Philadelphia Marathon, the first of his four wins in that city's event. In May 1954, he won the Yonkers Marathon, becoming the U.S. National Marathon Champion. At various times, Corbitt held the U.S. distance running records for 25 miles, the marathon, 40 miles, 50 miles and 100 miles. He remained a nationally competitive runner well into his fifties, until bronchial asthma limited his ability to compete at the elite level. On April 15, 1974, Corbitt finished his last Boston Marathon at age 55. His time of 2:49:16 was only 34 seconds slower than his 1951 time. In the 1974 race, he wore patches and wires on his chest for a medical experiment done by San Francisco physician-researcher and pioneer female marathoner, Joan Ullyot. He competed in 223 marathons in his extended career.

For many years, Corbitt ran more than 20 miles a day from his home near Broadway and the Harlem River, in The Bronx, New York City, to his office in downtown Manhattan. On some days, he also ran back home. At his peak, Corbitt ran up to 200 miles a week, far more than almost any other distance runner, though workouts by his English contemporary, Arthur Keily, mirrored his exhausting regimen. Corbitt ran most of his training miles at a fast pace. One of his standard workouts involved running 17 miles on a track, followed by 13 miles on roads. During one week in 1962, Corbitt ran 300 miles. He then traveled to England and competed in the 54 mile London to Brighton road race, finishing fourth. In his final ultra-distance race, held in 2003, he completed 68 miles in a 24-hour race at Queens' Flushing Meadow Park.

== Other contributions to running ==
Corbitt served as an unpaid official of many running organizations, including the Amateur Athletic Union. He was the co-founder and first president of the New York Road Runners and third President of Road Runners Club of America. He helped plan the New York City Marathon course. He conceived of moving the marathon course from running several loops around Central Park to running through the city's five boroughs. Corbitt served on various boards and committees for over 50 years. He helped create the masters division for runners over 40.

In the early 1960s, Corbitt's influence was second to none in the adoption of precision measurement and certification of road race courses in the United States. Until that time, the practice had regularly been haphazard, with officials often simply driving a vehicle on a course and watching its speedometer. Corbitt's measurement method involved carefully calibrating a bicycle wheel, then riding the courses with it, mechanically counting the number of revolutions. This technique was based on the work of John Jewell of Great Britain. This Jones Counter method is still in use today.

In 2003, at 84, Corbitt completed a 24-hour race by walking 68 miles, finishing 17th in a field of 35. Some runners were awed by his presence; others had no idea who he was. At 87, he was still volunteering at ultramarathon races in New York and sometimes even competing. He continued to treat physiotherapy patients. At the time of his death, Corbitt had embarked on a project to walk all the streets of Manhattan.

== Personal life and death ==
Corbitt never smoked and his only drink was a single can of beer while in the army. He practiced self-massage, carefully chewed every mouthful of food, and drank much water. He was a soft-spoken and gentle man who rarely spoke. He was an avid photographer and would attend many athletic events sporting a 35-mm camera until he died.

In 1946, he married Ruth Butler, whom he would remain married to until her death in 1989. They had one son, Gary.

== Recognition ==
In 1998, Corbitt was among the first five runners to be inducted into the National Distance Running Hall of Fame. Corbitt was also inducted into the American Ultrarunning Hall of Fame, on its inauguration in April 2006. USATF has named their annual "Men's Road Ultra Runner of the Year" award in his honor. In 2021, NYC Parks named a six-mile stretch of Central Park the "Ted Corbitt Loop".

== Biographies ==
- Corbitt: The Story of Ted Corbitt, Long Distance Runner by John Chodes, Ishi Press 2010 ISBN 4-87187-315-3
