= NBC Sports Radio =

American sports radio network

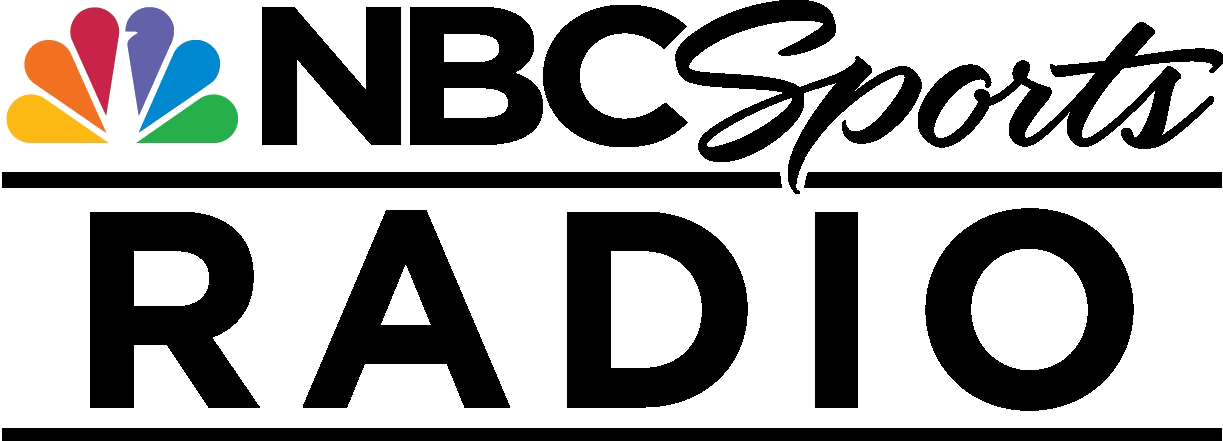
- Type: Sports radio network
- Country: United States

Ownership
- Owner: NBCUniversal
- Parent: NBC Sports Group; (producer); Westwood One; (distributor)
- Key people: Jack Silver; (program director); Rob Simmelkjaer; (SVP, NBC Sports Ventures; and International); Chris Corcoran; (EVP/GM, Dial Global)

History
- Launch date: September 4, 2012; 12 years ago
- Closed: March 31, 2020; 5 years ago

Links
- Website: www.nbcsportsradio.com

NBC Sports Radio was a sports radio network that debuted on September 4, 2012. The network content was produced by the NBC Sports Group division of NBCUniversal and distributed by Westwood One, which is the corporate successor to the remains of the original NBC Radio Network that was dissolved in the 1980s. NBC Sports Radio was available through over 300 affiliates throughout the United States as of September 2013, as well as through live streaming on NBCSportsRadio.com, NBCSports.com, WestwoodOneSports.com, and the affiliates' websites. Its launch made NBC the last major broadcast network with a sports radio network to complement its sports division.

On January 1, 2019, NBC Sports Radio switched from a 24/7 full-time network feed to a service featuring sports newsfeeds and syndicated offerings; the network's remaining operations were shut down 15 months later. It was relaunched in December 2020 as a Sirius XM-exclusive broadcast.

== Programming ==
NBC Sports Radio programming began airing 7:00pm–5:00am ET weekdays, but sports updates aired on the hour, every hour week-round. In January 2013, NBC Sports Radio launched weekend programming beginning Saturday at 7:00am and ending Monday at 1:00am. NBC Sports Radio had a full weekly schedule of programming beginning on Monday, April 8, 2013.

=== Live sports ===
Beginning with the 2016 Stanley Cup Finals, NBC Sports Radio relaunched the NHL Radio national broadcasts, which had not been heard nationwide since 2008. The 2016-17 season brought regular season games, the All-Star Game, a playoff game of the week, both conference finals, and the Stanley Cup Finals to the network.

NBC Sports Radio also had the rights to the Triple Crown of Thoroughbred Racing.

== Discontinuation ==
On November 29, 2018, Westwood One announced that NBC Sports Radio would no longer operate as a full-time network and would switch to a stripped-down syndicated service providing 24/7 sportscast newsfeeds at the top and bottom of the hour. Following the change, on January 1, 2019, the network carried two daily programs, PFT Live with Mike Florio in mornings and a revival of the fan-based The Daily Line in the afternoons. While not mentioned in the announcement, the live sports programming NBC Sports Radio carried would also continue, and the 2019 NHL Winter Classic aired on NBC Sports Radio unaffected. Hosts Newy Scruggs, Keith Irizarry, Mark Malone, and Dan Schwartzman were no longer part of the lineup, although their shows continue to be available online.

Westwood One cited the increasing competition among sports radio networks—it was effectively competing with itself since it also distributed CBS Sports Radio—as a factor, as well as the network's inability to draw prominent affiliates. Unlike CBS Sports Radio, which has a core affiliation with Entercom and Cumulus Media outlets, NBC had no major station group affiliations and largely relied on lower-end independent affiliates. In March 2020, Westwood One informed affiliates that it would no longer distribute or represent NBC Sports Radio's remaining programming after March 31, 2020; the discontinuation did not affect Westwood One's distribution of NHL playoff broadcasts. In 2021, ahead of the expiration of its television contracts, NBC spun its NHL radio rights off to Sports USA Radio Network.

== Revival as SiriusXM channel ==
Less than a year after the shutdown, NBC Sports Radio announced it would relaunch as a Sirius XM Radio exclusive service, with 12 hours a day of talk programming supplemented by simulcasts of NBC Sports events.

NBC Sports Audio is channel 85 on SiriusXM. Most original programming is simulcast with Peacock: Pro Football Talk with Mike Florio continues on the channel on weekday mornings, followed by The Dan Patrick Show (whose radio presentation is syndicated by Premiere Radio Networks) The Dan Le Batard Show and Fantasy Football Happy Hour with Matthew Berry. The other weekday programs also appear on NBC Sports' YouTube channel including Chris Simms Unbuttoned. Weekends feature Down the Stretch, a Saturday horse racing program, a rotating selection of NBC Sports-produced podcasts as well Peacock/YouTube simulcasts Chris Simms Unbuttoned and Off Track with Hinch & Rossi.
