= Mary Wittenberg =

American sports executive (born 1962)

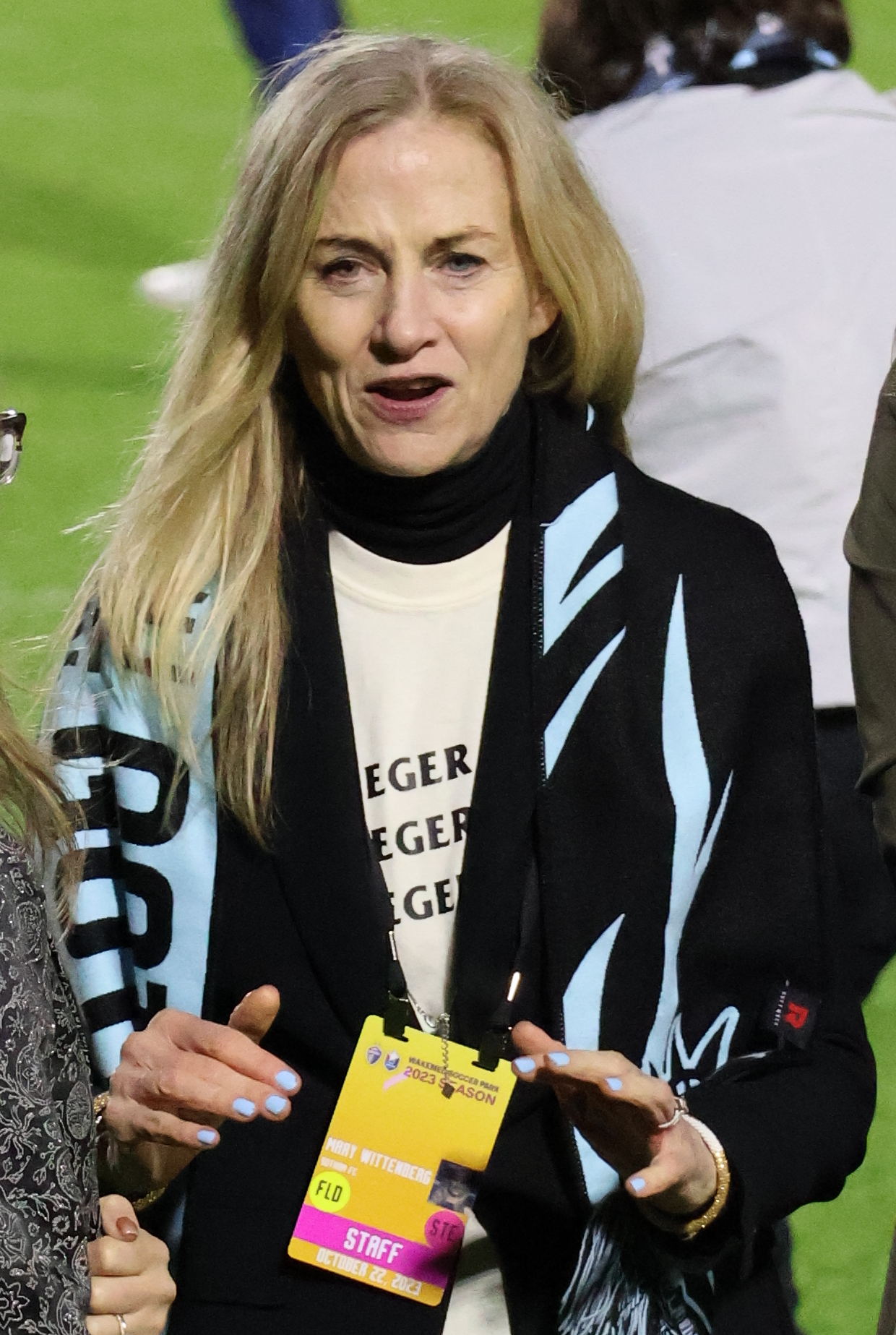
- Wittenberg at a Gotham playoff match in 2023
- Born: Mary Robertson; July 17, 1962 (age 64); Buffalo, NY, US
- Occupations: President of NJ/NY Gotham FC; Formerly President of EF Education–EasyPost

Mary Wittenberg (née Robertson; born July 17, 1962) is an American sports executive who formerly served as president of professional women's soccer club NJ/NY Gotham FC. She was previously the president of the EF Education–EasyPost cycling team, and president and chief executive officer of New York Road Runners (NYRR) through May 18, 2015. Wittenberg oversaw the TCS New York City Marathon and several other races, events, and programs that draw over 300,000 yearly participants.

Under Wittenberg's leadership, NYRR helped develop new initiatives such as the World Marathon Majors Series and several community programs that have introduced running to underprivileged children. For her efforts related to the TCS New York City Marathon, an article in the New York Times stated that Wittenberg "has transformed the New York City Marathon from traditional to competitive to innovative."

A former competitive runner, Wittenberg won the 1987 Marine Corps Marathon. She participates in many NYRR races.

== Early life ==
Wittenberg was born in Buffalo, New York, and raised in a large and athletic Irish Catholic family. She was the oldest of seven children, and played softball, baseball and basketball—sports that her father coached. In high school, she focused on cheerleading, and also starred on a champion West Side Rowing Club team. Wittenberg went on to attend Canisius College, and was a coxswain for the men's crew team that won a championship for small colleges.

During her senior year in College, Wittenberg took up running. She won a few local races and trained with Canisius' men's cross country team. Wittenberg also trained with the men's cross country team while attending law school at University of Notre Dame. While training with this group, she finished 16th at the Chicago Marathon with a time of 2:46.

After law school, Wittenberg moved to Richmond, Virginia to work for the Hunton & Williams law firm. She would spend busy days working in the office, marathon training with the University of Richmond cross country team, and studying to pass the bar. In 1987, she won the Marine Corps Marathon in a time of 2:44:34. Wittenberg used a late surge to overtake the leaders in the second half of the race.

Wittenberg's strong performance at the Marine Corps Marathon qualified her for the 1988 Olympic marathon trials. However, she soon required surgery for a knee injury, and a back ailment forced her to drop out of the qualifying race. Wittenberg ran in only two more marathons due to injuries and a focus on her law career.

== New York Road Runners ==
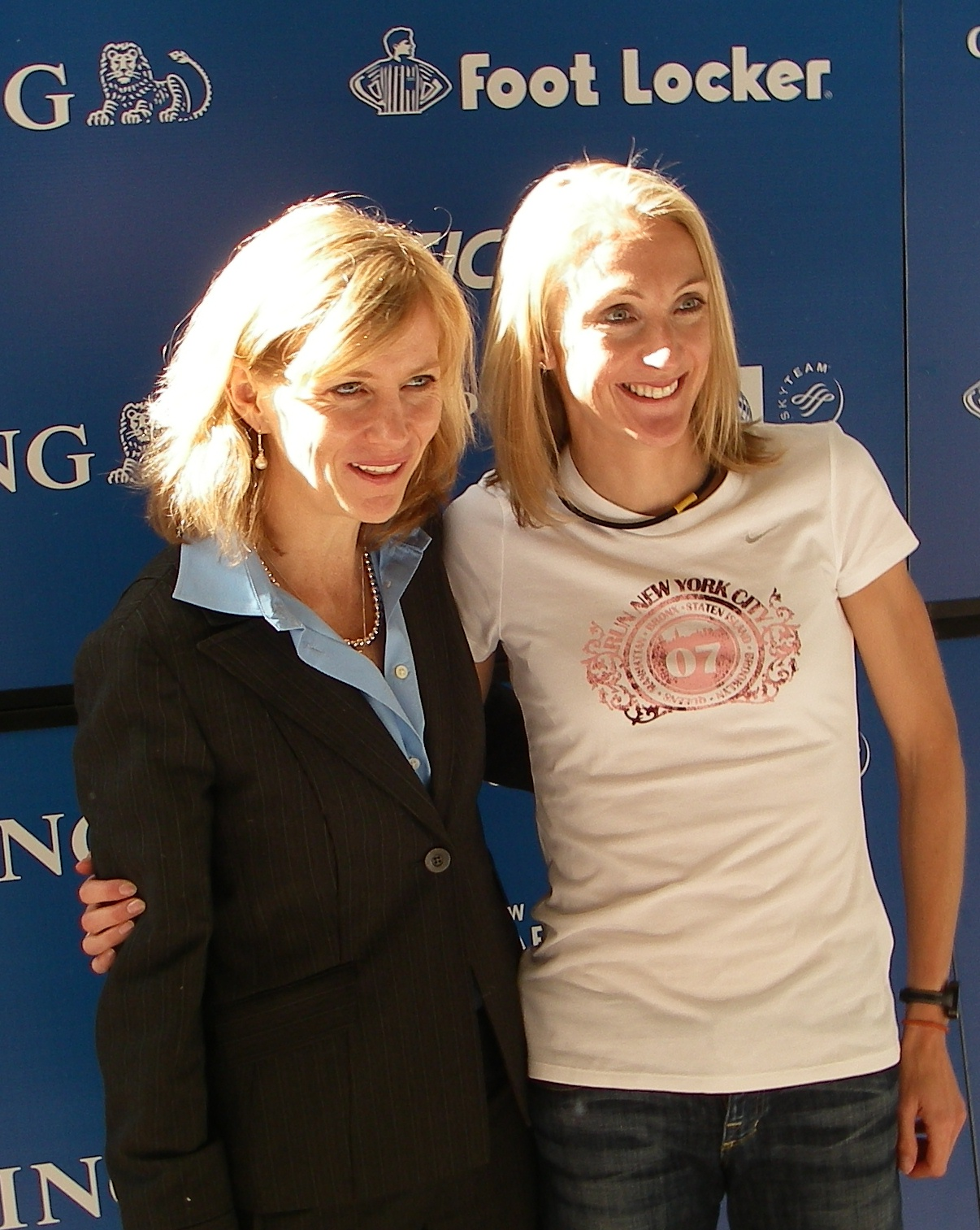
Wittenberg (left) and marathon record holder Paula Radcliffe at a press conference for the 2007 New York City Marathon

=== CEO ===
In the early 1990s, Wittenberg worked as an attorney who specialized in international trade deals for U.S. banks. In 1994, her firm transferred her to New York City. It was there that she was made a partner for her law firm. However, in 1998 Wittenberg opted for a career change, as she wanted to devote time to start a family.

Despite taking a significant pay cut, Wittenberg began work for New York Road Runners as Vice President and Chief Operating Officer. Her initial responsibilities ranged from overseeing NYRR publications to administering membership and race scoring. She helped secure the deal that made ING a title sponsor for the race. In 2005, Wittenberg was named President and Chief Executive of NYRR, and became the first female director of a major international marathon. NYRR administers the TCS New York City Marathon.

Under Wittenberg's leadership, a significant change was made for women marathoners to receive more prize money than their male counterparts. NYRR's budget has increased significantly, as has the viewership for the TCS New York City Marathon. NYRR and Wittenberg also administered the 2008 U.S. Men's Marathon Olympic Trials. During this event, former collegiate star Ryan Shay suffered a heart attack and died while competing in the race. Wittenberg's sensitive handling of the tragic news at the post-race press conference was cited as an example of her "class and compassion".

=== Running ===
While CEO of NYRR, Wittenberg spearheaded programs to increase running's popularity as a spectator sport. The NYRR has partnered with five other major marathons (London, Boston, Berlin, Chicago and Tokyo) to create the World Marathon Majors Series. Runners compete in these races to earn a cumulative standing, similar to NASCAR's Sprint Cup.

NYRR also provides financial support for the USA Distance Project, which is composed of training groups throughout the country for post-collegiate distance runners. As of November 2009, the NYRR have donated $750,000 to the Distance Project in a three-year span. After Meb Keflezighi's victory and five other American men finishing in the top ten of the 2009 New York Marathon, Wittenberg was very optimistic about the future of U.S. men's distance running. She said "I think this is just the start of delivering on the day" and "this has been a long time coming." Wittenberg and NYRR's financial support efforts for U.S. distance running was also noted after Keflezighi's victory. NYRR is also a prominent supporter of National Running Day, which is dedicated to celebrate and promote the sport.

=== Community ===
Wittenberg expanded NYRR's presence in the community by providing running classes for various levels of runners, establishing running programs for children through the NYRR Foundation, and setting up an online coaching network. Wittenberg is also involved with programs to prevent childhood obesity, and was a guest of Michelle Obama's at the White House for the President's Task Force on Childhood Obesity. The New York Daily News wrote in an article, "Wittenberg is emphatic in her conviction that her job isn't just to put on top pro races, but to cultivate healthy living and be a force for good in the community." NYRR events draw more than 300,000 yearly participants.

=== In the media ===
NYRR has received some attention for the high entry and application fees for the New York City Marathon. In 2009, the entry fee was raised, for both NYRR members and non-members, making it most expensive premium marathon in the United States. Also, there have been complaints about a non-refundable fee for those who merely apply to gain entry to the race. Wittenberg said that the application fee is necessary due to the weak economy and to ensure commitment from those applying.

After both the Men's and Women's 2012 Olympic Trials were awarded to Houston, Wittenberg expressed surprise and frustration with the USATF's process of picking a host city.

=== Reception ===
Wittenberg has received notable praise for her work at NYRR. Deena Kastor, an American record holder and Olympic Bronze medalist in the Marathon, said of Wittenberg: "In a very short amount of time, she has made so many positive changes in this sport". Shalane Flanagan, also an American record holder and an Olympic Bronze Medalist in the 10,000 m, commented "What Phil Knight is to Nike, Mary is to distance running." Olympic Sportswriter Philip Hersh was so impressed with Wittenberg's work with NYRR, he suggested that she be named CEO of USA Track and Field.

== Post-NYRR career ==
In May 2015, Wittenberg was named as CEO of the newly-founded Virgin Group subsidiary Virgin Sport, which was established to provide support to community leaders in the US, the UK and South Africa to organise mass participation running, cycling and triathlon events. However in January 2018 she and the rest of her New York-based team left the company after it decided to focus its efforts exclusively on the UK in 2018, after the planned inaugural American Virgin Sport event due to be held in San Francisco in October 2017 was cancelled due to the proximity of the Northern California wildfires which had started early that month.

In December 2018, the EF Education First–Drapac p/b Cannondale cycling team announced that Wittenberg had been appointed as their President, focusing on business and marketing and acting as a liaison between the team and its title sponsor.

In August 2023, National Women's Soccer League club NJ/NY Gotham FC announced that it had hired Wittenberg as the club's president, serving to lead the club's business operations.

== Personal life ==
NYRR holds over fifty races yearly, and though no longer a marathoner, Wittenberg participates in several of these races. In 2006, she competed in 18 races, and in 2007, she ran 20. She often runs and cross-trains in Central Park, and starts the day of the New York Marathon with a pre-dawn run.

Wittenberg lives on the Upper East Side of New York City, and is married with two sons. Her family attends St. Ignatius Loyola.
