= New York Road Runners =

American non-profit organization

- NYRR Logo
- Formation: 1958
- Founder: Ted Corbitt
- Legal status: Non-profit (501c3)
- Location: New York City
- Website: www.nyrr.org

New York Road Runners (NYRR) is a non-profit running organization based in New York City whose mission is to help and inspire people through running. It was founded in 1958 by Ted Corbitt with 47 members and has since grown to a membership of more than 60,000. As of 2012, it was considered to be the premier running organization in the United States.

== History ==
Following the establishment of the Road Runners Club of America in February 1958, Ted Corbitt became the founding president of the affiliated New York Road Runners in June of that year. At its founding, the organization was called Road Runners Club–New York Association, or RRC–NYA. The club organized seven events in its first year, all in the Bronx; these included its inaugural event, a six-mile cross-country race on September 28, 1958 in Van Cortlandt Park, and its inaugural marathon, called the Cherry Tree Marathon, on February 22, 1959.

In 1970, Fred Lebow and club president Vince Chiappetta organized the first New York City Marathon. Under Lebow, club president from 1972 to 1993, other signature races, including the Mini 10K, 5th Avenue Mile, and Midnight Run, were established. Allan Steinfeld succeeded Lebow and was named technical director of the New York City Marathon, which he was credited with modernizing, in 1981.

In 2005, Mary Wittenberg succeeded Steinfeld as president and CEO of NYRR. She also became the first female director of the New York City Marathon.

Michael Capiraso succeeded Wittenberg in 2015. In 2020 Kerin Hempel succeeded Capiraso, and in 2022 Rob Simmelkjaer succeeded Hempel and is the current CEO of the organization. George Hirsch served as chair of the NYRR Board of Directors from 2004 to 2023 and is now the Board Chair Emeritus. In July 2023, Nnenna Lynch succeeded Hirsch and is the current Chair of the Board of Directors.

Logo used from 2012 to 2026.

From 1981 through 2015, NYRR was headquartered on the Upper East Side on East 89th Street (also known as Fred Lebow Place), not far from Central Park. Upon the sale of that building, the organization announced a move to and creation of a Run Center near Columbus Circle the following year. Prior to 1981, it was based at the West Side YMCA.

== Community ==
NYRR serves runners of all ages and abilities through over sixty annual events, including races, community open runs, walks, training, virtual products, and other running-related programming. The organization's free youth programs and events serve kids in New York City's five boroughs and across the country.

=== Abebe Bikila Award ===
The club gives out the annual Abebe Bikila Award in recognition of individuals who have contributed to the sport of running. First awarded in 1978 and named in honor of Olympic marathon winner Abebe Bikila, the award is presented in November.

== Races ==
Races are held nearly every weekend and include destination races such as the:

- New York City Marathon
- NYC Half Marathon
- New York Mini 10K
- Fifth Avenue Mile
