= Nina Kuscsik =

American long-distance runner (1939–2025)

Nina Louise Kuscsik (née Marmorino; January 2, 1939 – June 8, 2025) was an American long-distance runner, who participated in over 80 marathons. In 1972, she became the first woman to officially win the Boston Marathon. After Beth Bonner, Kuscsik became the second American woman to complete a marathon in under three hours, running a time of 2:56:04 at the 1971 New York City Marathon (Bonner did so in the same race with 2:55:22).

== Background ==
Nina Louise Marmorino was born in Brooklyn, New York City, on January 2, 1939. In 1961, she married Richard Kuscsik, with whom she had three children before their marriage ended in divorce the following decade. She raised her two sons and one daughter in South Huntington, New York.

Before she took up running, she was New York women's speed skating champion, New York State women's roller-skating champion, and New York State women's bicycling champion, all in the same year. She started running because her bicycle broke and she needed another way of being active. Kuscsik believed that running creates a sense of calmness that is applicable to other parts of life.

Kuscsik died from respiratory failure at a hospital in Brookhaven, New York, on June 8, 2025, after a long struggle with Alzheimer's disease. She was 86.

== Running ==
Kuscsik was a onetime American women's record-holder for a 50-mile (80 km) run, through her run of 6:35:53 in 1977 in Central Park, New York. She continued running into her later years and was the first woman to finish the Empire State Building Run-Up in 1979, 1980 and 1981.

She was instrumental in influencing the U.S. Amateur Athletic Union, in late 1971, to increase its maximum distance for sanctioned women's races, leading to official participation by women in marathons, beginning at Boston in 1972.

Kuscsik was the only woman to participate in the first New York City Marathon in 1970. She did not feel well and had to drop out without finishing. In the following year she was one of four female finishers. She won the event in 1972. That year Kuscsik, Pat Barrett, Lynn Blackstone, Liz Franceschini, Cathy Miller, and Jane Muhrke protested the rule of the Amateur Athletic Union, which as implemented by the New York City Marathon that year meant that women had to start running ten minutes before the men. The women protested by sitting down and waiting ten minutes while holding signs protesting the rule, before starting to run when the men started; they became known as the NYC Six due to their protest. Ten minutes were added to their times. The ten minute difference requirement was dropped later in 1972.

In 2022, Kuscsik received the Abebe Bikila Award from the New York Road Runners, which is awarded for outstanding contributions to the sport of distance running.

== Marathons ==
- All results regarding marathon, unless stated otherwise

Year	Competition	Venue	Position	Notes
1972	Boston Marathon	Boston, United States	1st (woman)	3:10:26
1972	New York City Marathon	New York, United States	1st (woman)	3:08:41
1973	Yonkers Marathon	Yonkers, United States	1st (woman)	2:58.50
1973	New York City Marathon	New York, United States	1st (woman)	2:57:07

Sporting positions
Preceded by (Kenya) Eliud Kipchoge	Abebe Bikila Award; 2022	Succeeded by (United States) Patti Catalano
