= New York City Marathon =

American race

- The TCS New York City Marathon logo
- Date: First Sunday in November
- Location: New York City, United States
- Event type: Road
- Distance: Marathon; 26.219 miles (42.195 km)
- Primary sponsor: TCS (since 2013)
- Established: 1970 (56 years ago)
- Course records: 2:04:58 Tamirat Tola (2023); 2:19:51 Hellen Obiri (2025)
- Website: www.tcsnycmarathon.org
- 2026 New York City Marathon

The New York City Marathon, currently branded as the TCS New York City Marathon for sponsorship reasons, is an annual marathon (42.195 km or 26.219 mi) that courses through the five boroughs of New York City, United States. It is among the largest marathons in the world, with 59,135 finishers in 2025 and over 200,000 applicants for the 2025 race. Along with the Boston Marathon and Chicago Marathon, it is among the pre-eminent long-distance annual running events in the United States, and one of the Abbott World Marathon Majors.

The race is organized by New York Road Runners and has been run every year since 1970, with the exception of 2012, when it was cancelled due to the landfall of Hurricane Sandy, and 2020, when it was cancelled due to the COVID-19 pandemic. The race is held on the first Sunday of November and attracts professional competitors and amateurs from all over the world. Because of the popularity of the race, participation is chosen largely by a lottery system.

The lottery is conducted through drawing from three pools, "NYC Metro Area" applicants, "National" applicants, and "International" applicants. In 2025, there were more than 200,000 applications, and only 2-3% will be accepted. Guaranteed entry to the marathon can be gained by satisfying the requirements of the 9+1 program (where NYRR members run in nine sponsored races and volunteer at another event), becoming a NYRR Philanthropic Member at the 5K and 10K level, having completed 15 or more previous NYC Marathons, or meeting time qualification standards. In addition, runners can gain an entry by joining a team to raise funds for one of a number of charities.

== History ==
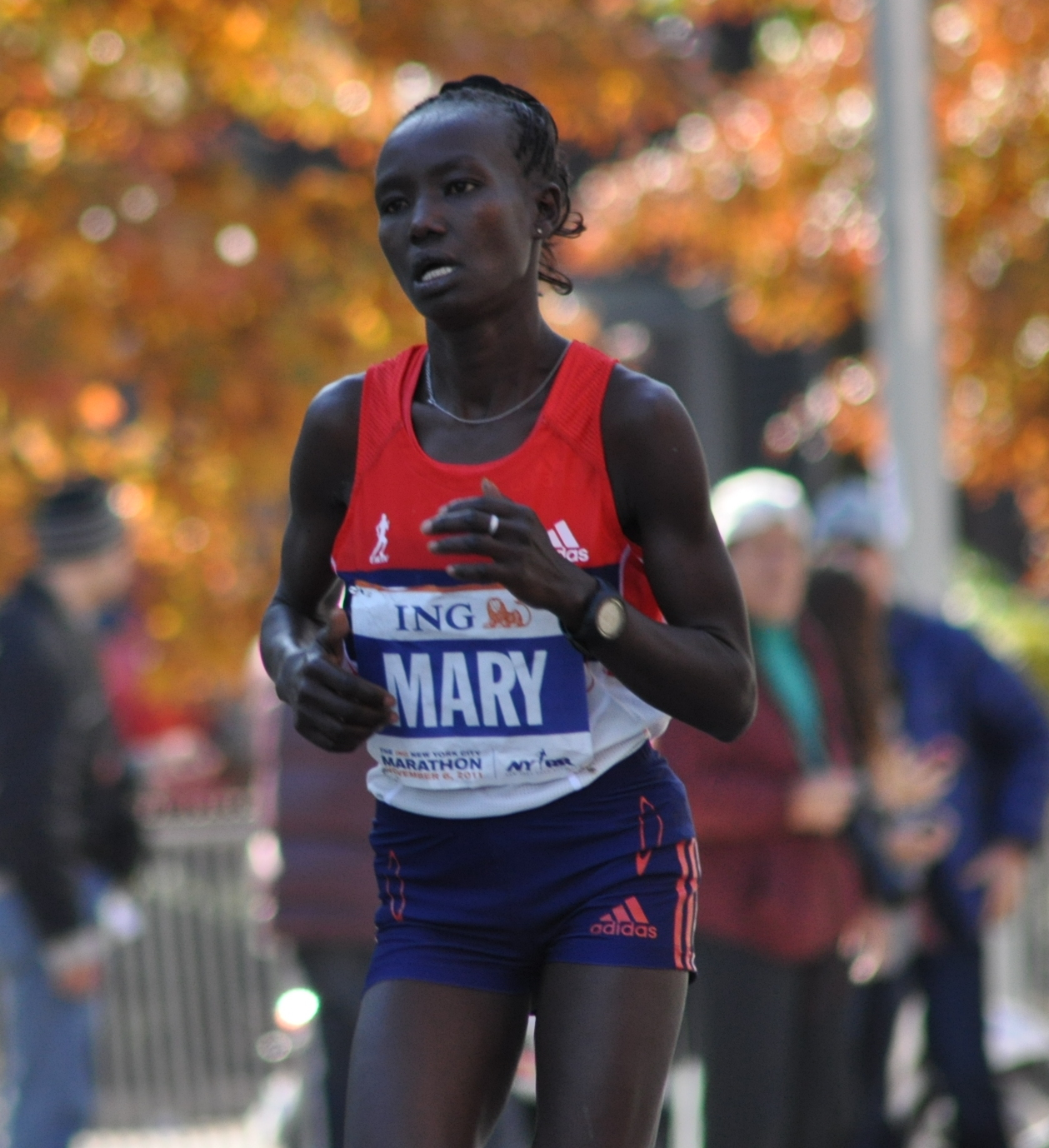
Mary Jepkosgei Keitany, the victor of the women's division in the 2018 NYC Marathon.

Brainchild of George Spitz, the first New York City Marathon was held 56 years ago on September 13, 1970, organized by Fred Lebow and the then president of New York Road Runners, Vincent Chiappetta, with 127 competitors running several loops around the Park Drive of Central Park. Only about 100 spectators watched Gary Muhrcke win the race in 2:31:38. Only 55 runners crossed the finish line.

That first marathon ignored the Amateur Athletic Union rules and allowed women in the event even if it meant that their scores would not be official. (Nina Kuscsik was the only woman to participate in that first marathon in 1970. She did not feel well and had to drop out without finishing.) For the second marathon in 1971 the AAU allowed women to participate if they started the race 10 minutes before, or 10 minutes after the men, or if they ran a separate but equal course. In 1972 Nina Kuscsik, Pat Barrett, Lynn Blackstone, Liz Franceschini, Cathy Miller, and Jane Muhrke protested the rule of the AAU, which as implemented by the marathon that year meant that women had to start running ten minutes before the men. The women protested by sitting down and waiting ten minutes while holding signs protesting the rule, before starting to run when the men started; they became known as the NYC Six due to their protest. Ten minutes were added to their times. The ten minute difference requirement was dropped later in 1972.

Over the years, the marathon grew larger and larger. To celebrate the U.S. bicentennial in 1976, Ted Corbitt proposed that the race traverse all five boroughs. With the support of Manhattan Borough President Percy Sutton, the men convinced Mayor Abraham Beame and, eventually, race director Fred Lebow. The race was a huge success, and what was intended as a one-time celebration became the annual course.

Dick Traum became the first person to complete a marathon with a prosthetic leg when he finished the 1976 New York City Marathon. The marathon grew in popularity two years later when Norwegian Grete Waitz broke the women's world record, finishing in 2:32:30. She went on to win the race an unprecedented nine times. An official wheelchair and handcycle division was introduced in 2000 and starting in 2002, the elite women are given a 35-minute head start before the elite men and rest of the field.

Beginning in 1976, the race was run in late October and continued to be held in late October until 1986, when the race day was moved to November. The earliest race day was the marathon's first; the latest date in the marathon season was November 14, 1993. The hottest year for the race was 1979 when the race day of October 21 reached 80 °F (27 °C). The coldest race was in 1995 when the race day of November 12 only reached 43 °F (6 °C), with an intense wind chill.

The New York City Marathon has now become the largest marathon anywhere in the world. Each year nearly two-million spectators line the course. Before 2013, the marathon was broadcast live in the New York area on WNBC and on Universal Sports for the entire country; however, in 2013, WABC-TV and ESPN announced they would begin broadcasting the New York City Marathon. Since 2022, the marathon has also been aired in Spanish via ESPN Deportes. The Marathon can also be watched online and is broadcast to many global TV networks.

== Course ==
=== Initial course ===
The race was founded by Fred Lebow. Ted Corbitt helped plan the course of the New York City Marathon. The initial course of 1970 consisted of repeated racing around Central Park. As per Ted Corbitt, who measured the original course:

The final measurements of the original New York City Marathon course, Manhattan's Central Park, were done the evening of September 8, 1970, after work and training day, using the Calibrated Bicycle Method of Measuring. The course consisted of a start-up, out and back loop of 0.79 mile, from W. 67th St. and Central Park West, near the Tavern-on-the-Green Restaurant, up to the 72nd St. and the West Drive intersection and return to the Tavern-on-the Green followed by a loop of 1.695 miles; then four 5.935 mile loops, totaling 26.225 miles (11 yards over distance), ending at the Tavern-on-the Green Restaurant.

=== Five borough course ===
Course of the New York City Marathon 2013; this is similar to the courses used in previous years.

Since 1976, the course has included all five boroughs of New York City. It begins on Staten Island, in Fort Wadsworth, near the approach to the Verrazzano–Narrows Bridge. The bridge typically carries only vehicular traffic and is closed for the event. Runners use both sides of the bridge's upper level and the westbound side of the lower level. In the opening minutes of the race, the bridge is filled with runners, creating a dramatic spectacle that is closely associated with the event.

After descending the bridge, the course winds through Brooklyn, mostly along Fourth Avenue and Bedford Avenue, for approximately the next 11 miles (18 km). Runners pass through a variety of neighborhoods, including: Bay Ridge, Sunset Park, Park Slope, Bedford–Stuyvesant, Williamsburg, and Greenpoint.

At 13.109 miles (21.097 km), runners cross the Pulaski Bridge, marking the halfway point of the race and the entrance into Long Island City in Queens. After about 15.534 miles (25.000 km), runners exit Queens and cross the East River via the lower level of the Queensboro (59th Street) Bridge into Manhattan. At this point in the race, many runners begin to tire, as climbing the bridge is considered one of the most challenging points in the marathon.

Reaching Manhattan after about 16 miles (26 km), the race proceeds north on First Avenue, then crosses into The Bronx via the Willis Avenue Bridge. The race is only in The Bronx for one mile before returning to Manhattan as the course follows East 138th St. before crossing the Madison Avenue Bridge. It then proceeds south through Harlem down Fifth Avenue and into Central Park at East 90th St. At the southern end of the park, the race proceeds west along 59th St./Central Park South, where thousands of spectators cheer runners on during the last mile. At Columbus Circle, the race reenters the park and finishes beside Tavern on the Green. The time limit for the course has varied; in 2025, the official finish time was 10:00 p.m. ET.

=== Corrals and timing ===
A wave start at the 2026 New York City Marathon.

In 2008, the race initiated a wave start. Professional women runners were given a separate, earlier start and the balance of the runners began in three staggered starts. The official times are those recorded by a computer chip attached to the back of the runner's bib number, which calculates when a runner crosses the start and when she crosses the finish, known as "net time" (as opposed to "gun time").

Runners also pass timing mats at 5 km intervals along the course, and e-mail notifications can be received by people following runners during the race to track their progress. Although the marathon publicity material uses miles, the timing mats are at 5 km intervals to accommodate the publishing of splits and also enabling potential world records for 20 km, 30 km and other sub-marathon distances to be recorded.

=== Different initial routes ===
Although there are three different routes taken through Bay Ridge and up Fourth Avenue in Brooklyn, all of the routes eventually merge at Lafayette Avenue in Brooklyn at Mile 8, and the distance covered by the runners is the same. A runner's bib will have a color (pink, orange, or blue) showing the initial route to which they are assigned, with each color having its own start village and corrals in the staging area.

== Past marathons ==
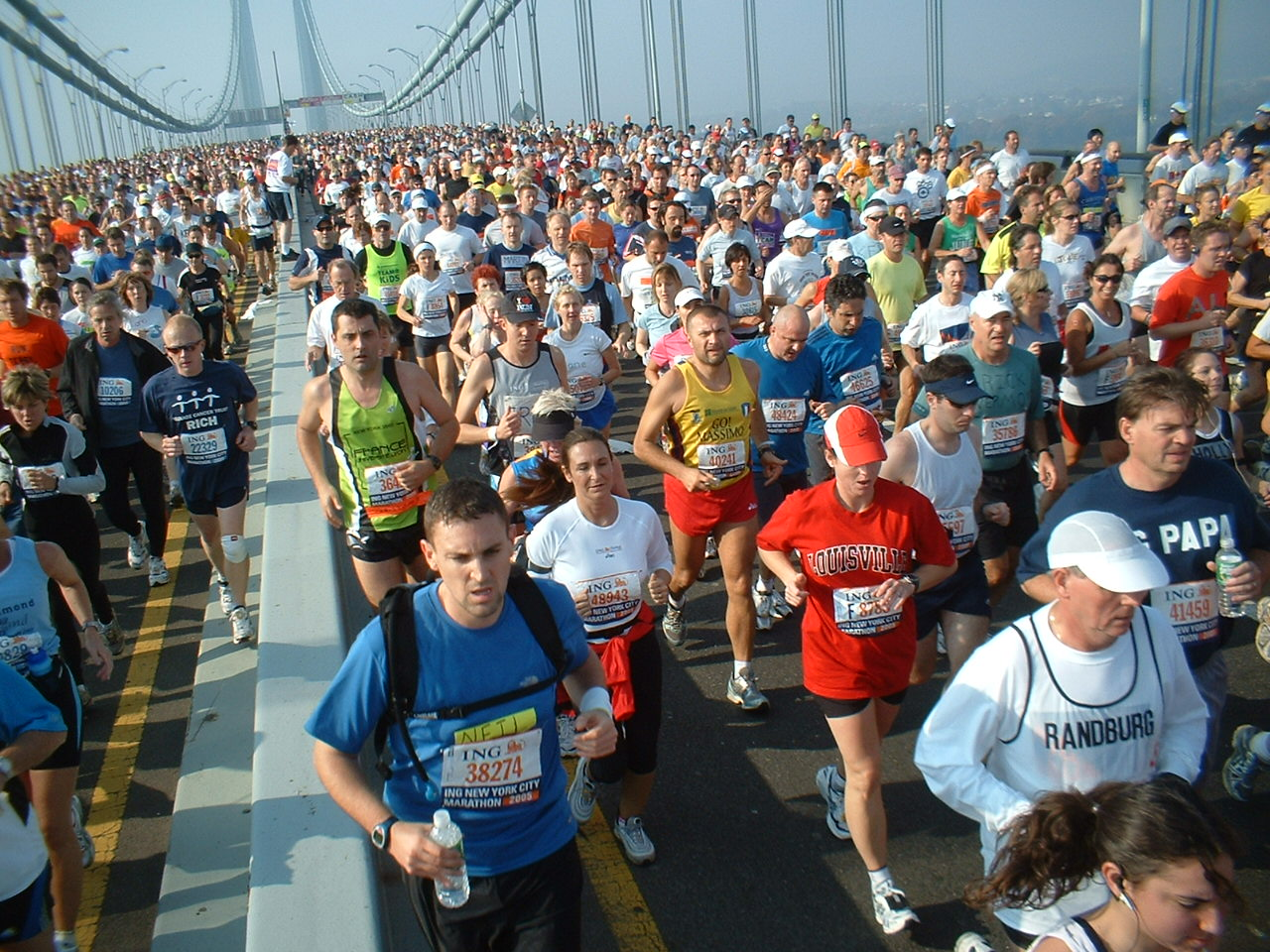
Thousands of runners on Verrazzano–Narrows Bridge.

=== 1970s ===
==== 1970 ====
On September 13, 1970, Gary Muhrcke won the first New York City Marathon held in Central Park in 2:31:38. 127 runners started the race and 55 finished. Nina Kuscsik, the sole woman entrant in the race, dropped out at 15 miles due to illness.

==== 1972 ====
Nina Kuscsik, Pat Barrett, Lynn Blackstone, Liz Franceschini, Cathy Miller, and Jane Muhrke protested the rule of the Amateur Athletic Union that women marathoners had to start their race ten minutes before or after the men, which as implemented by the New York City Marathon in 1972 meant that women had to start running ten minutes before the men. The women protested by sitting down and waiting ten minutes while holding signs protesting the rule, before starting to run when the men started; they became known as the NYC Six due to their protest. Ten minutes were added to their times. Kuscsik won the marathon. The ten minutes' difference requirement was dropped later in 1972.

==== 1974 ====
On September 29, 1974, Norbert Sander and Kathrine Switzer became the only New York City residents to win the New York City Marathon, Sander winning in 2:26:30 and Switzer the women's division in 3:07:29. Future four-time NYC Marathon champion Bill Rodgers placed fifth in 2:36:00 out of 259 finishers (250 men, 9 women).

==== 1976 ====
After being run in Central Park from 1970 to 1975, this edition of the marathon traversed all five boroughs for the first time. There were 2,090 entrants and 1,549 finishers. Bill Rodgers, who finished 40th in the 1976 Olympic Games marathon in 2:25:14, came back to win the NYC Marathon in a course record 2:10:10. He beat 1976 Olympic marathon silver medalist Frank Shorter who finished second by more than three minutes, Shorter clocking 2:13:12. 41-year-old Miki Gorman was the first woman in 2:39:11, also a course record.

==== 1977 ====
Bill Rodgers and Miki Gorman were the top male and female finishers, as they had been the previous year, Rodgers winning in 2:11:28 and Gorman in 2:43:10.

==== 1978 ====
Bill Rodgers won his third consecutive New York City Marathon in 2:12:12 on a warm day. Grete Waitz, the Norwegian long-distance runner, set a new course record for women at 2:32:30 to win the first of a record nine New York Marathons. The New York Road Runners club annually sponsors "Grete's Great Gallop," a 10 kilometer race around the Central Park loop, in her honor.

==== 1979 ====
For the first time in NYC Marathon history, over 10,000 runners (10,477) completed the race. Bill Rodgers won his fourth and last New York City Marathon on another warm day in 2:11:42, overtaking Kirk Pfeffer who led for the first 23 1/2 miles of the race. Grete Waitz again won the women's race with a finish time of 2:27:33, becoming the first woman ever to break 2:30. In a normally trivial mistake, Rosie Ruiz was accidentally given a finish time of 2:56:29. This qualified her for the 1980 Boston Marathon, where she crossed the finish line with a record time of 2:31:56. It was quickly determined that she had not run the entire course in either race, igniting a major scandal. New York Marathon chief Fred Lebow rescinded Ruiz's time after determining she had not finished the 1979 race, and officials in Boston quickly followed suit.

=== 1980s ===
==== 1980 ====
Alberto Salazar, an NCAA cross-country champion, won the 1980 New York City Marathon in 2:09:41. At the time this was the fastest marathon debut by an American. His performance was also a course record. He defended his title in 1981 and 1982. Grete Waitz won her third straight NYC Marathon in 2:25:42, also setting the course record in the women's division.

==== 1981 ====
Alberto Salazar's 2:08:13 was initially considered to be a world's best in the marathon, but the mark was later rescinded by The Athletics Congress (now known as USA Track & Field) when the course was measured to be short by approximately 150 metres (160 yd). Salazar remarked in 1985 that he would continue to believe that he ran a full marathon, since the lack of crowd control forced him to run wide during his turns. He has also suggested that a change in how courses were measured after the 1981 race contributed to the discrepancy in the course length.

==== 1983 ====
England's Geoff Smith held a lead through the last half of the race, but was caught at the 26 mile mark in Central Park by 1972 Olympic 1500 metres bronze medalist Rod Dixon from New Zealand, who won by 9 seconds. Dixon had been two and a half minutes behind with 10 km to go. Dixon stood at the finish line celebrating with a collapsed and defeated Smith on the ground behind him.

==== 1984 ====
Orlando Pizzolato won on a hot day, stopping six times due to heat cramps, but still winning by over a minute in 2:14:53. This was the slowest winning time since 1976 when the New York City Marathon became a world class event. Grete Waitz won her sixth marathon in 2:29:30.

==== 1985 ====
Orlando Pizzolato and Grete Waitz both repeated their previous year's victories. Pizzolato won in easier fashion than in 1984, in 2:11:34. Waitz took her seventh win in 2:28:06.

==== 1986 ====
This year's marathon was held in November (November 2) for the first time and has been ever since. Gianni Poli of Italy won in 2:11:06, the third year in a row that the men's winner was from Italy. Grete Waitz won for the eighth time in 2:28:06.

==== 1987 ====
Ibrahim Hussein of Kenya won the NYC Marathon in 2:11:01, the first man from Africa to do so. Priscilla Welch of Great Britain won in 2:30:17, while eight-time champion Grete Waitz did not compete.

==== 1988 ====
Steve Jones of the United Kingdom won, the first British man to do so, in 2:08:20. Grete Waitz won her ninth and last NYC Marathon in 2:28:07.

=== 1990s ===
==== 1990 ====
Douglas Wakiihuri of Kenya won this year's event in 2:12:39, the second-slowest time since 1976 when the marathon became a world class event. Wanda Panfil of Poland was the top woman in 2:30:45. She is the only woman to date from Poland to win this event. Grete Waitz, attempting to win her 10th NYC Marathon, finished fourth in 2:34:34 and then retired from competitive distance running.

==== 1992 ====
Grete Waitz completed her last New York Marathon with her friend and race co-founder, Fred Lebow, in celebration of Lebow's 60th birthday. Lebow had been diagnosed with brain cancer and died two years later in 1994. They both completed the race with a time of 5:32:35. Waitz also died of cancer in 2011.

The men's winner of this year's marathon was Willie Mtolo of South Africa in 2:09:29. Lisa Ondieki of Australia was the women's winner in 2:24:40, a course record that would last for nine years.

King Willem-Alexander of the Netherlands, then the Prince of Orange, ran the Marathon under the pseudonym "W. A. van Buren."

==== 1994 ====
During the 1994 event, Germán Silva recovered from a wrong turn seven-tenths of a mile before the finish that put him temporarily in second place 40 yards behind Benjamín Paredes. He ran a 5:15 final mile, including the detour, to beat Paredes and win the event by two seconds with a time of 2:11:21. The incident earned him the nickname "Wrong Way Silva"

==== 1995 ====
To date, this event was the coldest NYC Marathon ever (1979 was the warmest, topping out at 80 degrees). The temperature at race time was 40 degrees and only went up a few degrees as the race progressed. Wind gusts between 30 and 45 mph produced a wind chill factor in the upper 20s. Both male and female winners repeated their 1994 victories. Germán Silva of Mexico was victorious in 2:11:00. Tegla Loroupe of Kenya won the women's race in 2:28:06. Loroupe had become the first woman from Africa to win the NYC Marathon the previous year.

==== 1997 ====
The total number of finishers exceeded 30,000 (30,427) for the first time. John Kagwe of Kenya won the men's race in 2:08:12, while Franziska Rochat-Moser from Switzerland was the first woman in 2:28:43.

=== 2000s ===
==== 2000 ====
The 2000 NYC Marathon included the wheelchair division for men and women for the first time. Prize money was added in 2001. Abdelkader El Mouaziz of Morocco won the men's race in 2:10:09, becoming the first Moroccan man to take the title. Lyudmila Petrova of Russia was the first place woman in 2:25:45, the first woman from Russia to win the event.

==== 2001 ====
The 2001 NYC Marathon took place on November 4, less than two months after the September 11 attacks. Tesfaye Jifar of Ethiopia set a new course record of 2:07:43, a mark that stood until Geoffrey Mutai broke it in 2011. On the women's side, Margaret Okayo of Kenya won, setting a new course record of 2:24:21. She would set another new record two years later that still stands.

==== 2002 ====
The nation of Kenya swept the top three spots in the men's elite race in this year's marathon, the first time in Marathon history that this has occurred. Rodgers Rop won in 2:08:07, while fellow Kenyan Christopher Cheboiboch finished 10 seconds behind in 2:08:17. Laban Kipkemboi of Kenya took third place in 2:08:39. On the women's side, Joyce Chepchumba, also of Kenya, won the women's elite race in 2:25:56. Lyubov Denisova of Russia placed second in 2:26:17 and Esther Kiplagat of Kenya was third in 2:27:00. This was also the first time that Kenyans won both the men's and women's race in marathon history.

==== 2003 ====
A record 34,729 people participated in the race. The top male finisher was Martin Lel of Kenya in a time of 2:10:30. The top female finisher was Margaret Okayo of Kenya in time of 2:22:31, breaking her previous course record of 2:24:21 set in 2001. In recent years, runners from Kenya have dominated the event. The top Americans were Matt Downin (2:18:48) and Sylvia Mosqueda (2:33:10), both from California. Rapper P.Diddy also ran for charity and raised $2,000,000 for the New York City Education system.

==== 2004 ====
The top female finisher was Britain's Paula Radcliffe in a time of 2:23:10, beating Kenya's Susan Chepkemei by 4 seconds, the closest finish up to that time. The men's winner was Hendrik Ramaala of South Africa with a time of 2:09:28. The top Americans were Meb Keflezighi (2nd, 2:09:53) from California and Jenny Crain (15th, 2:41:06), from Wisconsin.

==== 2005 ====
In the closest finish in New York City Marathon history, Paul Tergat of Kenya barely outsprinted Hendrick Ramaala of South Africa in the final meters of the race for a time of 2:09:30, beating Ramaala by one second. In the women's race, Jeļena Prokopčuka of Latvia won in a time of 2:24:41. Top amongst the Americans were Meb Keflezighi of California (2:09:56) and Jen Rhines of California (2:37:07). South African Ernst van Dyk took the wheelchair race in 1:31:11.

The 2005 event was administered by new NYRR CEO Mary Wittenberg, the first woman director of an international Major marathon.

==== 2006 ====
The top male finisher was Marílson Gomes dos Santos of Brazil in a time of 2:09:58, while Jeļena Prokopčuka of Latvia won the female marathon for the second consecutive time in 2:25:05. Gomes dos Santos became the first South American ever to win the race. Stephen Kiogora of Kenya placed second, and Paul Tergat, the 2005 defending champion and former marathon world record holder, placed third.

Former American professional road racing cyclist and triathlete Lance Armstrong ran in the 2006 race, finishing 868th with a time of 2:59:36. He also ran the same year in the British 10K. Arkansas Governor Mike Huckabee also completed the race in 2006, finishing in 5:33:43, and wearing bib #110, signifying the 110 pounds lost during his weight loss campaign.

Amanda McGrory won the female wheelchair race in a time of 1:54:17, while the male wheelchair division was won by Kurt Fearnley in a time of 1:29:22.

==== 2007 ====
Runners before the race at Verrazzano–Narrows Bridge in the 2007 marathon.

Professional wheelers heading for the starting line in 2007.

The 2007 race was held on Sunday, November 4. It was the final race of the 2006–2007 World Marathon Majors, a two-year series of elite marathon racing that also included the Boston, Chicago, London and Berlin marathons. However, there were very few elite American marathoners participating in 2007 because many had competed the day before at the 2008 USA Men's Olympic Marathon Trials, which was held in conjunction with the New York City Marathon on some of the same course.

Martin Lel from Kenya won the men's race in a time of 2:09:04, completing a double of the 2007 London and New York Marathons. The women's winner was the world marathon record holder Paula Radcliffe from Great Britain in a time of 2:23:09, one second faster than her 2004 win.

==== 2008 ====
The 2008 New York City Marathon was held on Sunday, November 2. A field of 37,899 runners participated. The men's winner was Marílson Gomes dos Santos in 2:08:43. Paula Radcliffe won her third NYC marathon in 2:23:56.

The 2008 marathon events saw the deaths of three marathon participants. Carlos Jose Gomes, 58, of Brazil fell unconscious shortly after completing the race in 4:12:15. An autopsy revealed that he had a preexisting heart condition and died of a heart attack. Joseph Marotta, 66, of Staten Island, N.Y. succumbed to a heart attack hours after he completed his fourth New York City Marathon. He walked the course in 9:16:46. Fred Costa, 41, from Cincinnati, OH collapsed at the marathon and died on November 15 of a heart attack.

==== 2009 ====
The 2009 New York City Marathon was held Sunday November 1, 2009. Meb Keflezighi of the United States won the men's race (the first American winner since Alberto Salazar in 1982) with a time of 2:09:15 while Ethiopian Derartu Tulu took the women's crown in 2:28:52, the first Ethiopian woman to do so. This was the first marathon in history with more than 40,000 official finishers, as 43,660 crossed the finish, 5,053 more than the previous best at the 2008 edition of this race.

=== 2010s ===
==== 2010 ====
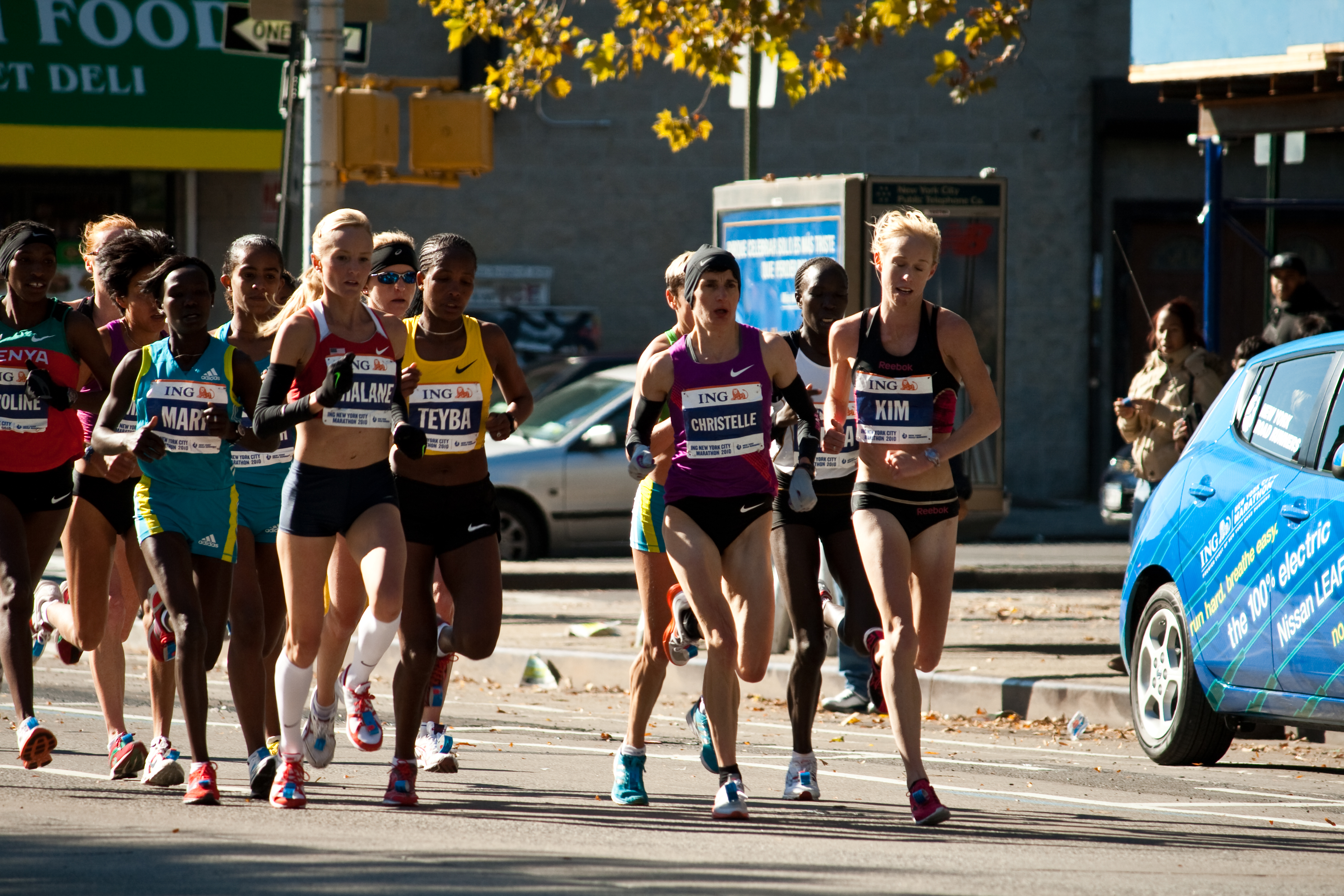
Women lead pack at mile 17 in Manhattan

The 2010 New York City Marathon was held on November 7. Gebregziabher Gebremariam of Ethiopia, in his first ever marathon, won the race after breaking away from his last rival, Emmanuel Mutai of Kenya, in the 25th mile to finish in a time of 2:08:14. The race featured 37-year-old world record holder Haile Gebrselassie, who ran with a bad knee and dropped out of the race at the 16th mile. Afterwards, he announced his retirement, but later reversed this decision. Edna Kiplagat won the women's title with a time of 2 hours, 28 minutes, 20 seconds, ahead of American Shalane Flanagan.

The total number of official finishers, 44,829 (28,757 men and 16,072 women) was a new world record for a marathon race.

==== 2011 ====
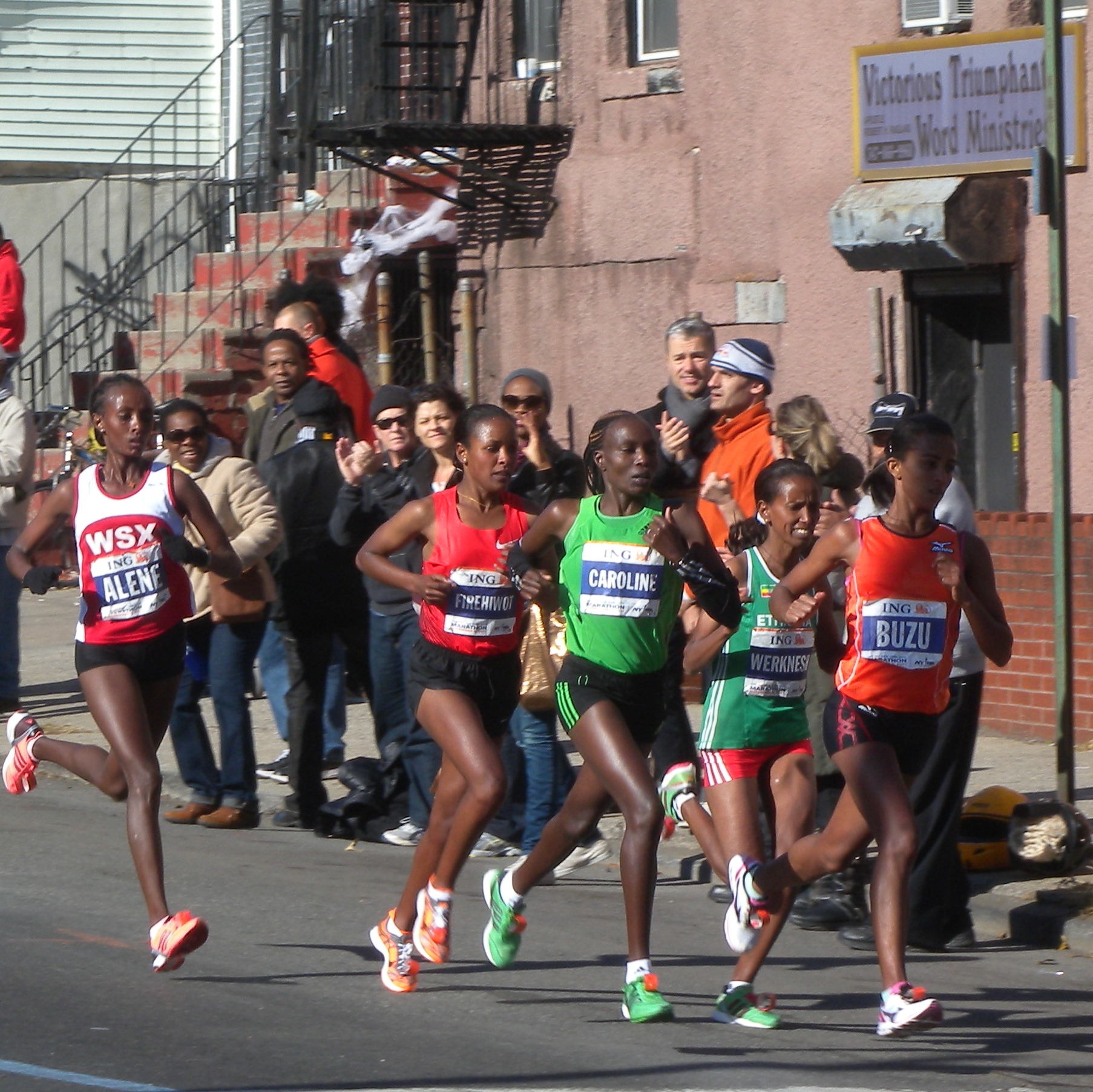
Lead women in Brooklyn

The 2011 Marathon was held on November 6. The men's event was won by Geoffrey Mutai of Kenya in a time of 2:05:06, breaking the 10-year-old course record. Second-place runner Emmanuel Mutai, also of Kenya, and third-place runner Tsegaye Kebede of Ethiopia also beat the previous record for the event, with times of 2:06:28 and 2:07:14, respectively. Geoffrey Mutai, who won the Boston Marathon earlier in the year, became the first man to win both races in course-record time in the same year. Firehiwot Dado of Ethiopia won the women's race in a time of 2:23:15, her first major marathon victory. Coming second, 4 seconds behind the leader originally from Ethiopia, but now living in the Bronx, was Bizunesh Deba with a time of 2:23:19. There were a world record 46,795 official finishers: 29,867 men and 16,928 women.

Edison Peña, one of the miners who had been trapped in the 2010 Copiapó mining accident, ran the race. Retired Dutch soccer player Edwin van der Sar ran in 4:19 and said it was the toughest thing he had ever done. Former CART champion Alex Zanardi won the handcycle class.

==== 2012 ====
The 2012 marathon was scheduled for November 4, 2012. Organizers planned to hold the event despite the passage of Hurricane Sandy the week before. However, on November 2, 2012, the marathon was cancelled; Mayor Michael Bloomberg said that: "While holding the race would not require diverting resources from the recovery effort, it is clear that it has become the source of controversy and division... We would not want a cloud to hang over the race or its participants, and so we have decided to cancel it." Three days earlier, Bloomberg had said that the marathon would take place. That declaration started a debate on whether to hold the race with thousands of residents still without electricity, public transportation, and other basic needs. Proponents for going ahead said that the event would give an economic and morale boost to the city, while opponents said the resources (such as food, water, and police) were better used elsewhere.

Some of the entrants ended up helping with cleanup efforts. Others chose to congregate and run an informal "Shadow Marathon" in Central Park. Controversy over the cancellation of the Marathon, the timing of the announcement and the repercussions of the decision, including criticism of New York Road Runners CEO Mary Wittenberg, continued well after the 2012 race was meant to have taken place. As a resolution, all who were registered to run the 2012 race were offered three options: a refund; guaranteed, non-complimentary entry to the New York City Marathon in 2013, 2014, or 2015; or guaranteed, non-complimentary entry to the NYC Half 2013.

==== 2013 ====
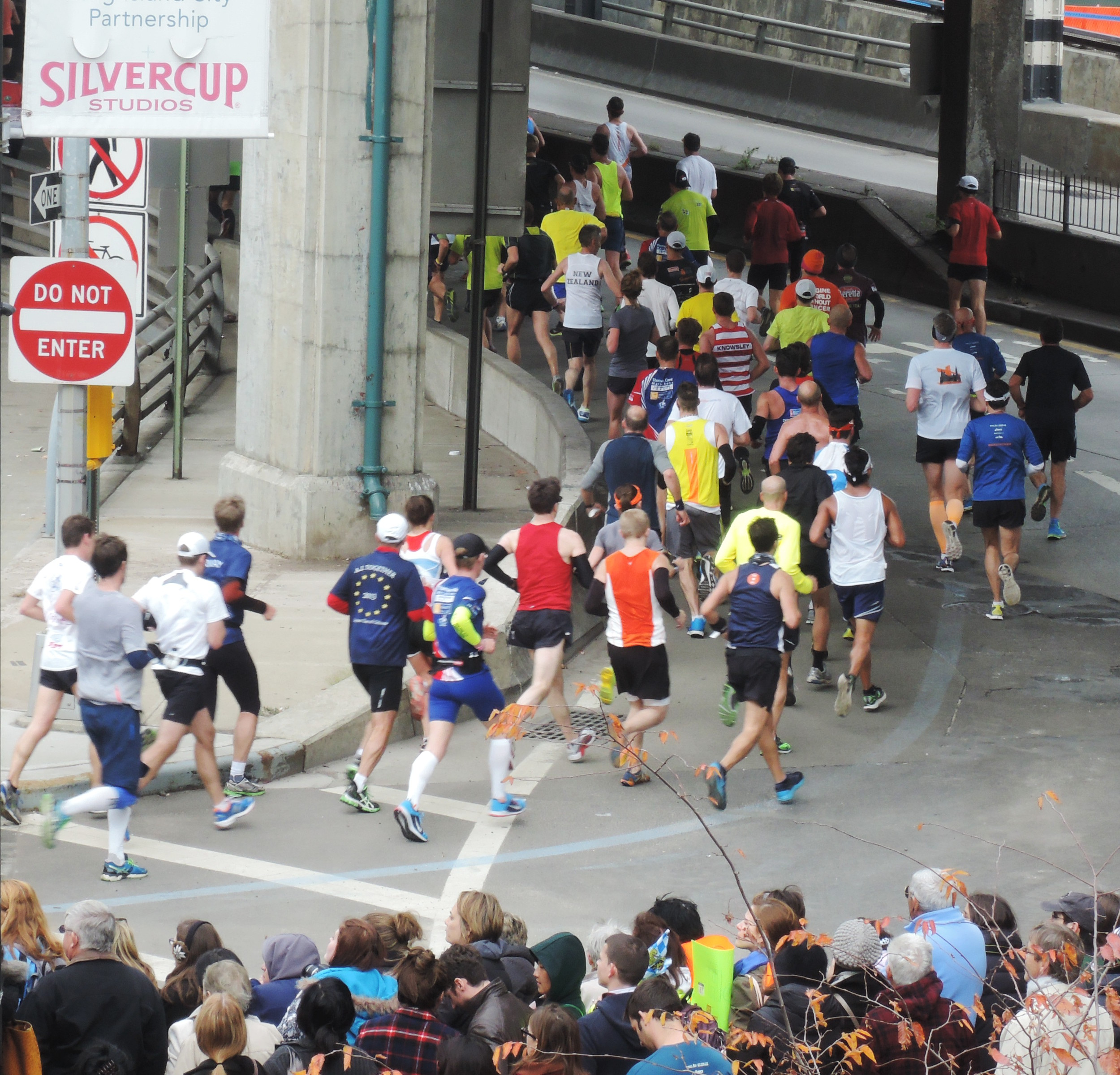
Entering the Queensboro Bridge

The 2013 New York City Marathon was run November 3, 2013. The race proved to be the clincher for the 2013 World Marathon Majors titles for both men and women. Duplicating their London Marathon wins from April 2013, Tsegaye Kebede and Priscah Jeptoo each won $500,000 for their season-wide efforts. After the 2012 cancellation, Geoffrey Mutai returned to become the first repeat winner in 15 years (after John Kagwe in 1997–1998). Under windy conditions, his 2:08:24 was more than 3 minutes slower than in 2011. Mutai broke away around mile 22 to win by almost a minute over Ethiopian Tsegaye Kebede, who had finished third two years earlier. Jeptoo spotted Buzunesh Deba, an Ethiopian runner who has lived in the Bronx since 2009, three and a half minutes at the half-marathon mark, but came back to pass her in the 24th mile.

==== 2014 ====
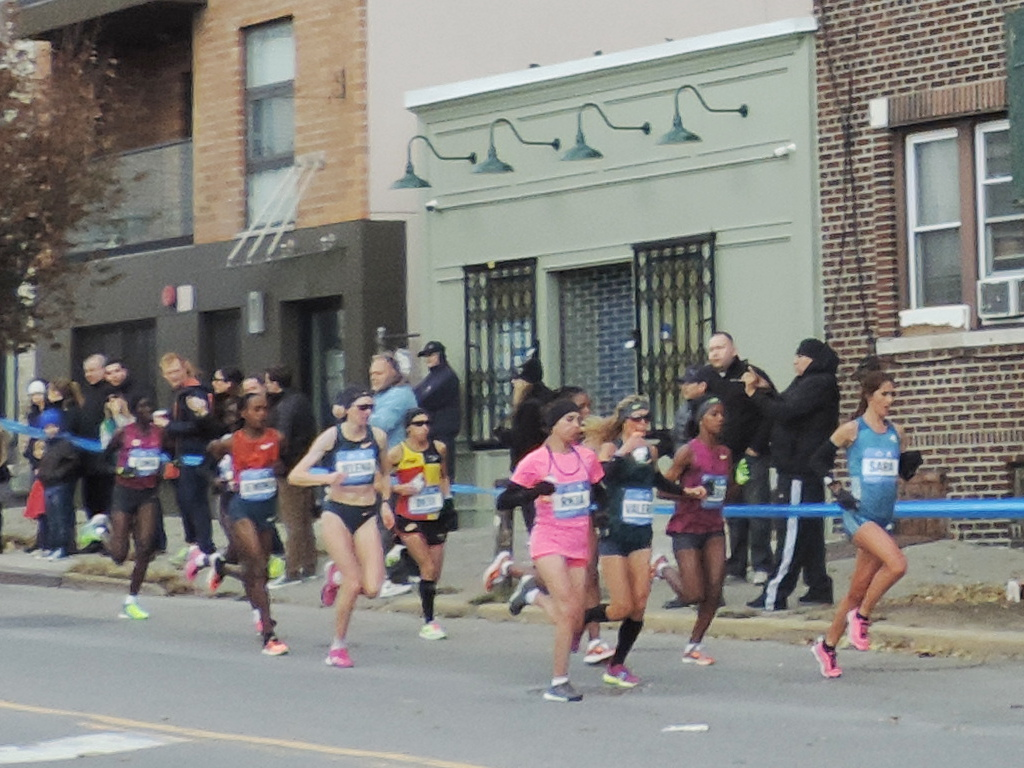
Lead women in Greenpoint, Brooklyn

The 2014 New York City Marathon was run on Sunday, November 2, 2014. It was announced on October 2, 2013, that the marathon's main sponsor would be Tata Consultancy Services starting in 2014. It is an eight-year deal, and the race was renamed the TCS New York City Marathon. Wind was unusually high, blowing from the north on a mostly northbound course. Winners were Wilson Kipsang in 2:10:59 and Mary Keitany in 2:25:07.

==== 2015 ====
The 2015 New York City Marathon was run on Sunday, November 1, 2015. Winners were Stanley Biwott in 2:10:34 and Mary Keitany in 2:24:25.

==== 2016 ====
The 2016 New York City Marathon was run on Sunday, November 6. Ghirmay Ghebreslassie won the men's competition with a time of 2:07:51. The female race winner was Mary Keitany from Kenya in 2:24:26. The men's wheelchair race winner was Marcel Hug with a time of 1:35:49, and the women's wheelchair race winner was Tatyana McFadden with a time of 1:47:43. Lauren Lubin ran as the first openly non-binary athlete in the New York City Marathon.

==== 2017 ====
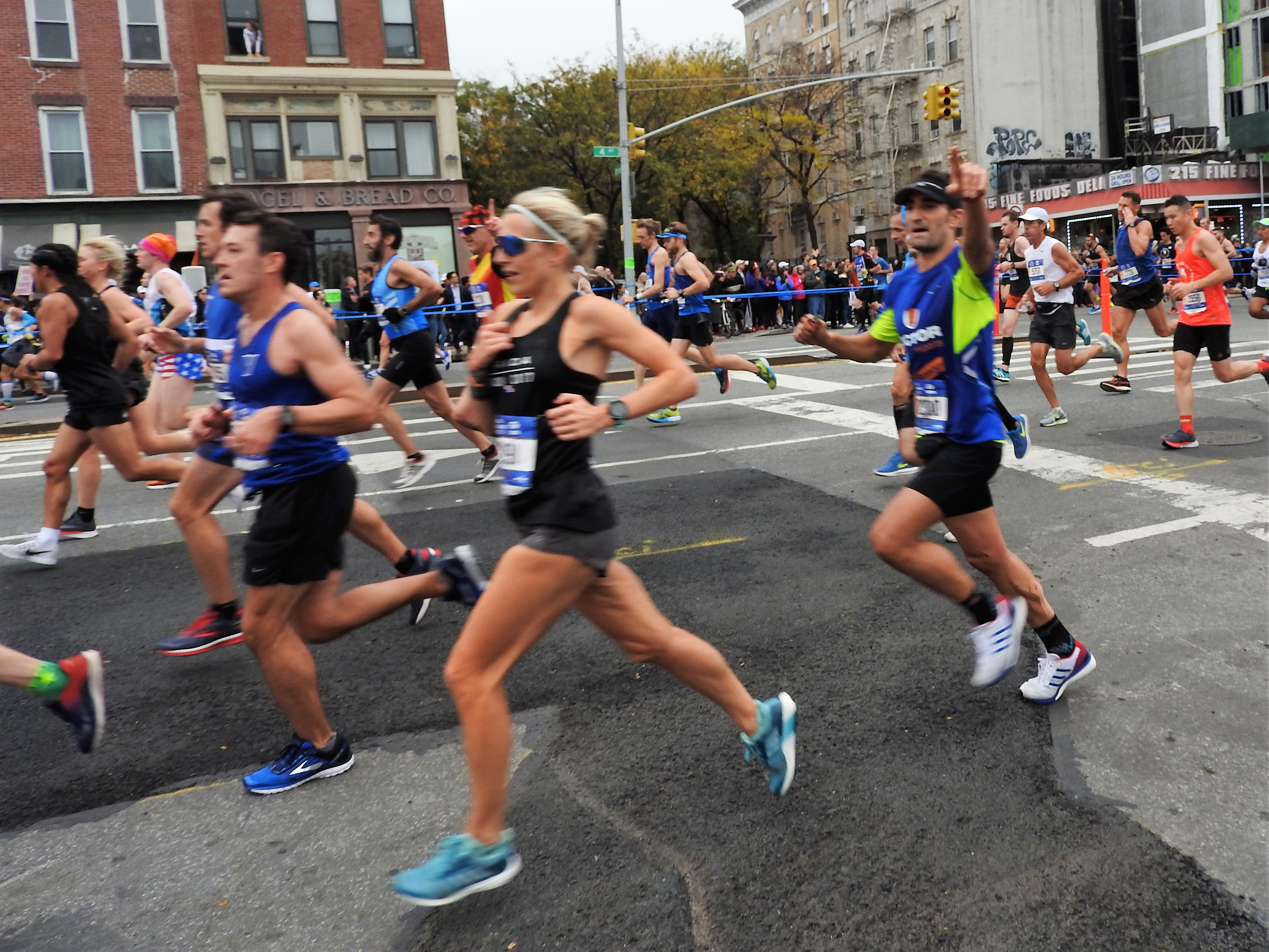
Union Street, Brooklyn

The 2017 New York City Marathon was run on Sunday, November 5. Geoffrey Kamworor of Kenya won the men's competition with a time of 2:10:53, 3 seconds ahead of 2nd-place finisher Wilson Kipsang. In 3rd place was Lelisa Desisa with a time of 2:11:32.

On the women's side, the winner was Shalane Flanagan, a native of Marblehead, Massachusetts. She was the first American to win since 1977. Her time was 2:26:53. Mary Keitany placed 2nd with 2:27:54, and Mamitu Daska finished 3rd with a time of 2:28:08.

==== 2018 ====
The 2018 New York City Marathon was run on Sunday, November 4. Lelisa Desisa of Ethiopia won his first New York City Marathon after finishing third in 2017, third in 2015 and second in 2014, followed by Shura Kitata and defending champion Geoffrey Kamworor. Their times of 2:05:59, 2:06:01 and 2:06:26 were the second, third and fourth fastest times in race history.

Mary Keitany was in a pack of women that passed halfway in 1:15:50 but then she ran the second 13.1 miles in 1:06:58, the fastest time ever for any second half of a marathon, to capture her fourth NYC crown in 2:22:48, the second fastest time ever there. London winner, Vivian Cheruiyot was second in 2:26:02 and American Shalane Flanagan placed third in 2:26:22, 31 seconds faster than her winning time the previous year.

Once again there were a world record number of finishers, with 52,812 (30,669 men/22,143 women) runners completing the race.

==== 2019 ====
The 49th New York City Marathon took place November 3. Joyciline Jepkosgei, of Kenya, won the women's marathon and Geoffrey Kamworor, also of Kenya, won the men's marathon. Jepkosgei was a first-time winner while Kamworor had won in 2017. Manuela Schär, of Switzerland, won the women's wheelchair competition and Daniel Romanchuk, of the United States, won the men's. The 2019 NYC Marathon set another world record for the number of finishers ever for a marathon with 53,627 runners crossing the finish line.

=== 2020s ===
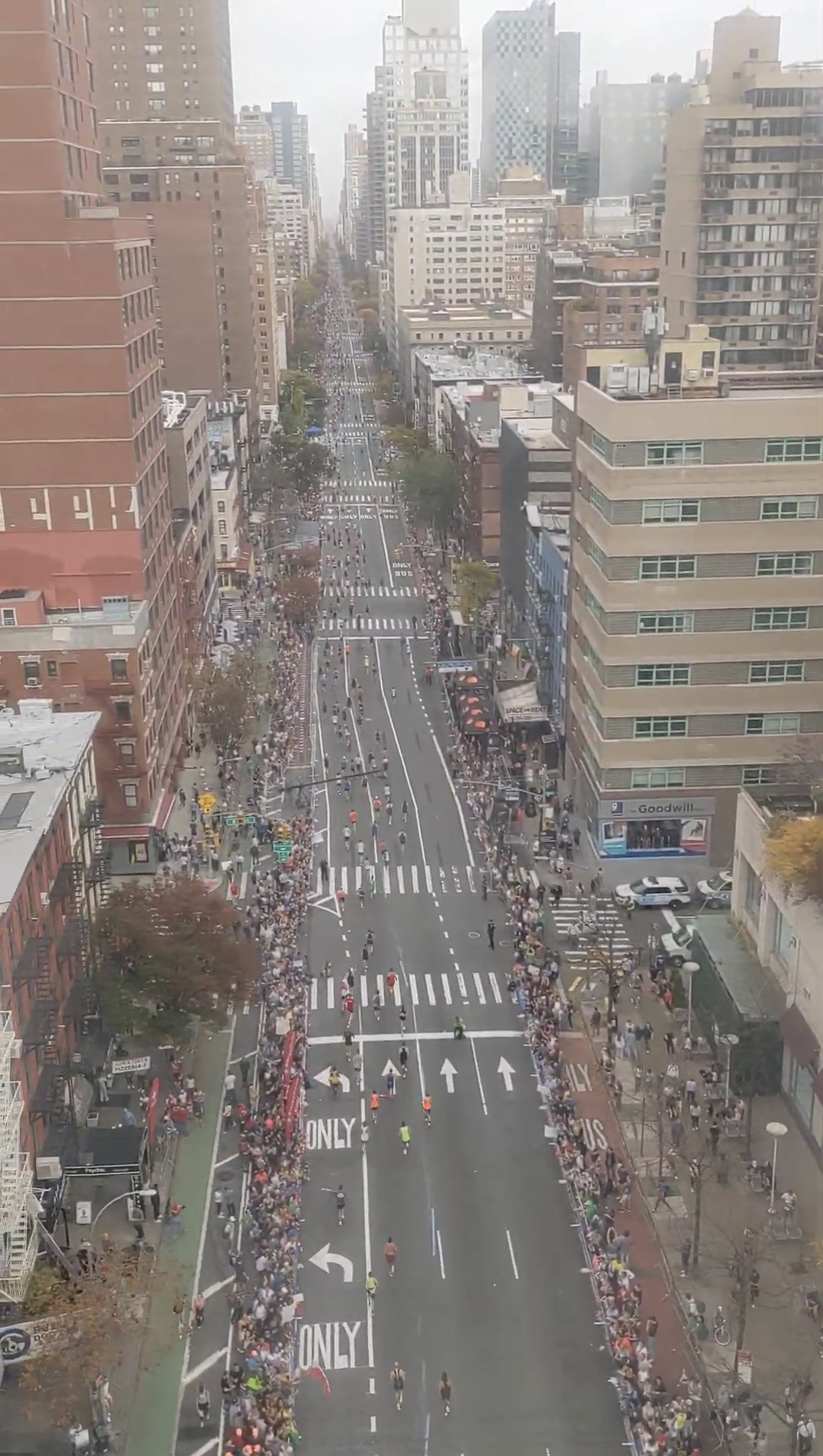
The 2022 marathon as viewed from above 60th Street and 1st Avenue in Manhattan, the first full-capacity race since the COVID-19 pandemic began.

==== 2020 ====
The 2020 New York City Marathon was cancelled due to the COVID-19 pandemic, and the following year's race would instead be the 50th running. It was the first cancellation in eight years. Entrants were offered a refund or guaranteed complimentary entry to future New York City marathons.

As the original event was cancelled, runners were able to compete in the virtual race between 17 October 2020 and 1 November 2020. Over 15,000 athletes took part. The male race was won by British athlete and Team Real Runners coach Kevin Quinn in a time of 2:23:48. The women's race was won by American professional athlete Stephanie Bruce in a time of 2:35:28.

==== 2021 ====
The 50th running of the New York City Marathon was held on November 7, 2021. The number of competitors was limited to 33,000 due to coronavirus pandemic precautions. The male winner of this year was Albert Korir with a time of 2:08:22, and the female winner was Peres Jepchirchir with a time of 2:22:39.

==== 2022 ====
The 2022 New York City Marathon was run on November 6, 2022. Total finishers numbered 47,838.

The male winner of this year was Evans Chebet with a time of 2:08:41, and the female winner was Sharon Lokedi with a time of 2:23:23.

The New York City Marathon, while it did not invite runners from Russia and Belarus, allowed runners from those countries to participate as individuals.

==== 2023 ====
The 2023 New York City Marathon took place on Sunday, November 5, 2023, with 51,402 total finishers.

The male winner of this year was Tamirat Tola with a time of 2:04:58, which is the current course record, and the female winner was Helen Obiri with a time of 2:27:23.

==== 2024 ====
The 2024 New York City Marathon took place on Sunday, November 3, 2024 with more than 55,000 runners.

The male winner of this year was Abdi Nageeye with a time of 2:07:39, and the female winner was Sheila Chepkirui with a time of 2:24:35.

==== 2025 ====
The 2025 New York City Marathon took place on Sunday, November 2, 2025 with more than 55,000 runners.

The male winner of this year was Benson Kipruto with a time of 2:08:09, and the female winner was Helen Obiri with a time of 2:19:51, which is the new course record.

==== 2026 ====
The race was held on November 1, 2026. Andreas Almgren of Sweden won the men's race in 2:06:01, competing in his first marathon. Sheila Chepkirui of Kenya won the women's race in 2:24:36, her second victory in New York.

Awards
Preceded by José María Olazábal	Prince of Asturias Award for Sports; 2014	Succeeded by Marc and Pau Gasol
