= Fred Lebow =

Holocaust survivor and founder of New York City Marathon (1932–1994)

Fred Lebow

Fred Lebow (June 3, 1932 – October 9, 1994), born Fischel Lebowitz, was a Holocaust survivor, runner, race director, and founder of the New York City Marathon. Born in Arad, Romania, he presided over the transformation of the race from one with 55 finishers in 1970 to one of the largest marathons in the world with more than 52,000 finishers in 2018. He was posthumously inducted into the National Distance Running Hall of Fame in 2001.

Lebow ran in the inaugural marathon in 1970, finishing 45th out of 55 runners with a time of 4:12:09. He ran his last NYC Marathon on November 1, 1992, in celebration of his 60th birthday, after being diagnosed with brain cancer in early 1990, with his friend, nine-time NYC Marathon women's winner Grete Waitz of Norway, with a time of 5:32:35.

During his career he completed 69 marathons in 30 countries. Along with the NYC Marathon he also organized the Empire State Building Run-Up, the Fifth Avenue Mile, and the CrazyLegs Mini Marathon (a 10K road race), which was the first strictly women-only road race. Lebow was also president of New York Road Runners for twenty years.

== Death ==
He died in 1994, and was buried at Mount Hebron Cemetery in Flushing, Queens.

His memorial service at the finish line of the New York City Marathon attracted a crowd of more than 3,000 mourners, which at that time was the largest memorial gathering in Central Park since the death of John Lennon.

== Legacy ==
In 1991, Lebow established Fred's Friends as the first official charity of the New York Marathon. The program uses marathon runners to raise funds for cancer research.

In 1995, Fred's Team was established in honor of Lebow. Every year, athletes of all abilities join Fred's Team to compete in marathons, half-marathons, triathlons, bike races, and other endurance events around the world to raise funds for pioneering research at Memorial Sloan-Kettering Cancer Center. As of 2018, Fred's Team had raised more than $87 million.

In 1990 a runner from San Diego California Daniel S. Mitrovich ran in his first New York City Marathon and was so impressed by what he experienced that he decided to have Fred Lebow honored by then President George H.W. Bush. On January 31, 1991, at 3:35 pm just three months later Daniel S. Mitrovich took Fred Lebow into the Oval office to be honored by President Bush. It was US Senator Alan K. Simpson, Wyoming, who arranged the meeting. Also in the meeting was brother of Daniel S. Mitrovich George S. Mitrovich, Alan K. Simpson and Fred Lebow. All four joined President Bush in the Oval office that day.

On October 31, 1991, eleven months later at a Luncheon arranged by Daniel S. Mitrovich and the Dale Carnegie organization, President J. Oliver Crom and his son Michale Crom agreed to underwrite the event in the Starlight Room of the Waldorf Astoria in New York City emceed by Famous Participatory author George Plimpton, US Senator Alan K. Simpson along with some of the greatest marathoner runners in history which included nine time gold medal Olympian winner Carl Lewis and 4 time New York City Marathon and 4 time Boston Marathon Winner Bill Rodgers, Joan Benoit Samuelson First woman to win a gold medal in the 1984 Los Angeles Summer Olympics and three-time winner of the New York City marathon Alberto Salazar, Dr. William A Burke, founder of the Los Angeles Marathon, world record holder in the mile for over 27 years Steve Scott and NYCM race director Allan Steinfeld. It was there that day a maquette was unveiled by nine-time winner of the New York City Marathon Grete Waitz and announced by Daniel S. Mitrovich that there would be someday a life size statue of Fred Lebow placed in New York's Central Park. It was Daniel S. Mitrovich whose idea it was, and his design of the statue, who hired sculpture artist Jesus Ygnacio Dominguez. The Maquette was Unveiled.

It depicts Lebow timing runners with his watch. In 2001, the statue was moved to its permanent location on the East Side Central Park Drive at 90th St. Every year the statue is moved to a spot in view of the finish line of the marathon.

New York Road Runners hosts an annual race called the Fred Lebow Half-Marathon in January, consisting of 13.1 miles in 2 loops of Central Park.

== In popular culture ==
The documentary Run for Your Life tells the story of Lebow and the New York City Marathon.
