= Road Runners Club of America =

Running club in the United States

- Formation: February 22, 1958
- Founder: H. Browning Ross
- Type: 501(c)(3) non-profit educational
- Headquarters: Arlington (Rosslyn), Virginia
- Members: 180,000
- president: Brent Ayer
- Key people: Jean Knaack, Lisa Paige
- Website: http://www.rrca.org

Founded by H. Browning Ross in 1958, the Road Runners Club of America (RRCA) is the oldest and largest distance running organization in the United States with over 1,500 running club and event members representing 200,000 individual runners active in their running communities.

Road Runners Clubs may also include members who may have diverse abilities, from using asthma inhalers to brain tumors, heart disease, and even Paralympian wheelchair racers. Roman Runners, a local club in upstate New York, is described in the 25th anniversary report of the Boilermaker Road and Wheelchair Race in the adjoining city of Utica, New York (Racino, 2002).

== Programs ==
- Liability insurance covering running clubs and events.
- Runner's safety, education, and advocacy
- Coaching certification - to accredit coaches who specialize in training long distance runners.
- National, regional and state championship event series.
- Road Scholars Program - provides grants for promising post-collegiate athletes.
- National RUN@WORK Day
- Kids Run the Nation Program - 10-week youth running program curriculum and small grant fund for starting and/or maintaining youth running programs
- Club Running Magazine
- Runner Friendly Community Program
- National Running Awards Program
- Volunteer Recognition Program

== Structure ==
For a list of national officers (1958–present), see footnote: The ultimate policy making power is vested in the member clubs who vote at the annual meeting or special meetings. The voting power of each club is proportional to its size. The membership elects a 9-member Board of Directors. Four Directors are responsible for four Regions of the nation. The four Regional Directors in turn select State Representatives to coordinate RRCA efforts in each state. (Some large states such as California and Texas have more than one state representative.) Although individuals can join the RRCA, the RRCA encourages individuals to join a local member running club where one is available. All members of each member running club receive the full benefits of RRCA membership.

== Accomplishments ==
The RRCA has promoted women's running, including lobbying for a Women Olympic marathon and hosting women-only races. The RRCA has advocated equal prize structures for men and women runners. The RRCA member clubs conduct thousands of races each year and provide training programs for runners in every state. Many RRCA clubs award college scholarships to local runners. The RRCA has awarded 58 $5,000 annual Road Scholar stipends to promising post-collegiate athletes.

== Awards ==
As a service to its members, the RRCA developed the RRCA National Running Awards to acknowledge the service and commitment of outstanding volunteers to the running community. These awards are selected by an independent committees of evaluators based upon a nationwide solicitation of nominations. Outstanding contributors are recognized at the Annual Awards Banquet in a variety of categories. The National Running Awards include the Male and Female Runners of the Year; the RRCA Hall of Fame Inductee(s); the Outstanding Club President of the Year; the Outstanding Club Volunteer of the Year; the Jerry Little Memorial Journalism awards for the Outstanding Club Newsletter, Club Writer, and Journalist; the Outstanding Youth Program Director Award; the Browning Ross Spirit of the RRCA award, the Outstanding Road Race of the Year, and the Outstanding Beginning Running Program award.

=== Hall of fame ===
For a list of inductees, see footnote

For biographical sketches of each decade's inductees, see footnote

The RRCA American Long Distance Running Hall of Fame was established in 1971. Its members "have made significant contributions to the sport of long distance running either through excellence in the sport or significant contributions to the sport." The first set of inductees was elected in April 1971 at RRCA's 14th annual meeting in Boston, Massachusetts.

=== Other awards ===
For a list of the winners of each award, see footnote

- Outstanding State Representative of the Year Award
- Outstanding Club President of the Year Award
- Outstanding Volunteer of the Year Award
- Browning Ross Spirit of the RRCA Award
- Outstanding Youth Program Director Award
- Outstanding Beginning Running Program Award
- Outstanding Web Site Awards:
  - Best Site
  - Large Club Top Site
  - Small Club Top Site
- Jerry Little Journalism Awards:
  - Journalistic Excellence Award
  - Jerry Little Memorial Club Writer Award
  - Jerry Little Journalism Award for Outstanding Club Newsletters
- Outstanding Electronic Newsletter Awards:
  - Large Club
  - Small Club
- Road Runner of the Year Awards:
  - Male Open
  - Female Open
  - Male Masters
  - Female Masters
- Road Race of the Year
- President's Special Award for Achievement
