= List of USA Outdoor Track and Field Championships winners (men) =

The USA Outdoor Track and Field Championships is an annual outdoor competition in the sport of athletics organised by USA Track & Field, which serves as the national championship for the sport in the United States. The venue of the championships is decided on an annual basis and several events are hosted separately.

The earliest national champions were declared by the New York Athletic Club at their annual men's championships, starting in 1876. The National Association of Amateur Athletes of America was formed and organised the men's national championships from 1879 to 1888, followed by the Amateur Athletic Union (AAU) from 1888 to 1979. The men's and women's championships have been held jointly since 1976. Following professionalisation of the sport, the running of the national championships was taken over by The Athletics Congress of the USA (TAC) from 1980. TAC rebranded as USA Track & Field (USATF) in 1993. The national championships served as the United States Olympic Trials (track and field) in 1920, 1928, 1932, and from 1992 onwards. Olympic Trials were held separately in other years, and winners at the trial event were not declared national champions.

The national championships for cross country and road running are held separately from the main track and field competition.

== Men ==
=== 100 metres ===
US National Championship winners in men's 100-meter dash and 100-yard dash
| 1876–1878 New York Athletic Club | 1876: Charles McIvor; 10.5; 1877: William Wilmer; 10.5; 1878: Fred Saportas; 10.0w |
| 1879–1888 NAAAA | 1879: Beverly Value; 10 3/8; 1880-81: Lon Myers; 10.4; 10 1/4; 1882-83: Arthur Waldron; NT; 10 1/4; 1884-86^{ro}: Malcolm Ford; 10.8*; 10.6; 10.4; 1887: Charles Sherrill; 10.4; 1888^{Note 1}: Fred Westing; 10.4 |
| 1888–1979 Amateur Athletic Union | 1888^{Note 1}: Fred Westing; 10.0; 1889-90: John Owen; 10.4; 9.8; 1891: Luther Cary; 10.2; 1892: Harry Jewett; 10.0; 1893: Charles Stage; 10.2; 1894: Tom Lee; 10.2; 1895-97: Bernie Wefers; 10.0w; 10.2; 9.8; 1898: Frank Jarvis; 10.0; 1899: Arthur Duffey; 10.0; 1900: Maxie Long; 10.0; 1901: Frank Sears; 9.8; 1902: Pat Walsh; 10.0; 1903: Archie Hahn; 10.2; 1904: Lawson Robertson; 10.5; 1905: Charles Parsons; 9.8; 1906: Charles Seitz; 10.2; 1907: Harold Huff; 10.2; 1908: William Hamilton; 10.2; 1909: William Martin; 10.2; 1910: James Rosenberger; 10.2; 1911: Gwin Henry; 10.0; 1912-13: Howard Drew; 10.0; 10.4; 1914-15: Jo Loomis; 10.2; 9.8w; 1916-17: Andy Ward; 10.0; 10.2; 1918: Arthur Henke; 10.0; 1919: William Hayes; 10.2; 1920^{OT}: Loren Murchison; 10.0; 1921: Charley Paddock; 9.6; 1922: Robert McAllister; 10.0; 1923: Loren Murchison; 10.1; 1924: Charley Paddock; 9.6; 1925: Frank Hussey; 9.8; 1926: Charley Borah; 9.8; 1927: Chester Bowman; 9.6; 1928^{OT}: Frank Wykoff; 10.6; 1929-30: Eddie Tolan; 10.0; 9.7; 1931: Frank Wykoff; 9.5; 1932^{OT}: Ralph Metcalfe; 9.5; 1933-34: Ralph Metcalfe; 10.5; 10.4; 1935: Eulace Peacock; 10.2w; 1936: Jesse Owens; 10.4; 1937: Perrin Walker; 10.7; 1938: Ben Johnson; 10.7; 1939: Clyde Jeffrey; 10.2w; 1940: Harold Davis; 10.3; 1941: Barney Ewell; 10.3; 1942-43: Harold Davis; 10.5; 10.3; 1944: Buddy Young; 10.5; 1945: Barney Ewell; 10.3; 1946-47: William Mathis; 10.7; 10.5; 1948: Barney Ewell; 10.6; 1949: Andy Stanfield; 10.3; 1950: Art Bragg; 10.4; 1951: Jim Golliday; 10.3; 1952: Dean Smith; 10.5; 1953-54: Art Bragg; 9.5; 9.5; 1955-56: Bobby Morrow; 9.5; 10.3; 1957: Leamon King; 9.7; 1958: Bobby Morrow; 9.4; 1959-60: Ray Norton; 10.5; 10.5; 1961: Frank Budd; 9.2; 1962-64: Bob Hayes; 9.3; 9.1w; 10.3; 1965: George Anderson; 9.3; 1966: Charles Greene; 9.4; 1967: Jim Hines; 9.3; 1968: Charles Greene; 10.0w; 1969-70: Ivory Crockett; 9.3; 9.3; 1971: Del Meriwether; 9.0w; 1972: Robert Taylor; 10.2; 1973-74: Steve Williams; 9.4; 9.9; 1975^{G1}: Steve Williams; 10.21; 1976^{G2}: Robert Woods; 10.44; 1977^{G1}: Steve Williams; 10.24; 1978: Clancy Edwards; 10.14w; 1979: James Sanford; 10.07 |
| 1980–1992 The Athletics Congress | 1980: Stanley Floyd; 10.19; 1981-83: Carl Lewis; 10.13; 10.11; 10.27; 1984: Sam Graddy; 10.28; 1985: Kirk Baptiste; 10.11; 1986: Carl Lewis; 9.91w; 1987: Mark Witherspoon; 10.04; 1988: Emmit King; 10.04; 1989: Leroy Burrell; 9.94; 1990: Carl Lewis; 10.05; 1991: Leroy Burrell; 9.90; 1992^{OT}: Dennis Mitchell; 10.09 |
| 1993–present USA Track & Field | 1993: Andre Cason; 9.85w; 1994: Dennis Mitchell; 10.13; 1995: Michael Marsh; 10.23; 1996^{OT}: Dennis Mitchell; 9.92; 1997: Maurice Greene; 9.90; 1998: Tim Harden; 9.88w; 1999: Dennis Mitchell; 9.97w; 2000^{OT}: Maurice Greene; 10.01; 2001: Bernard Williams; 9.95w; 2002: Maurice Greene; 9.88w; 2003: Bernard Williams; 10.11; 2004^{OT}: Maurice Greene; 9.91; 2005: Justin Gatlin; 10.08; 2006-08^{OT}: Tyson Gay; 9.93; 9.84; 9.68w; 2009: Mike Rodgers; 9.91w; 2010-11: Walter Dix; 10.04; 9.94; 2012^{OT}-13: Justin Gatlin; 9.80; 9.75; 2014: Mike Rodgers; 10.09; 2015: Tyson Gay; 9.87; 2016^{OT}: Justin Gatlin; 9.80; 2017: Justin Gatlin; 9.95; 2018: Noah Lyles; 9.88; 2019: Christian Coleman; 9.99; 2021^{2020 OT}: Trayvon Bromell; 9.80; 2022: Fred Kerley; 9.77; 2023: Cravont Charleston; 9.95; 2024^{OT}: Noah Lyles; 9.83; 2025: Kenny Bednarek; 9.79 |
| Notes | Note 1: In 1888 both the NAAAA and the AAU held championships; OT: The 1920, 1928, 1932, and since 1992, championships incorporated the Olympic Trials, otherwise held as a discrete event.; 2020 OT: The 2020 Olympic Trials were delayed and held in 2021 due to the COVID-19 pandemic.; Distance: Until 1927 the event was over 100 yards, and again from 1929-31; ro: In 1886 the event was won after a run-off; *: Penalized one yard for false start; G1: Race was won by Don Quarrie (Jamaica) competing as a guest; G2: Race was won by Chris Garpenborg (Sweden) competing as a guest |

=== 200 metres ===
US National Championship winners in men's 200-meter dash
| 1876–1878 New York Athletic Club | 1876: Not held; 1877: Edward Merritt; 1878: Wm. Willmer |
| 1879–1888 NAAAA | 1879–81: Lon Myers; 1882–83: Henry Brooks; 1884: Lon Myers; 1885–86: Malcolm Ford; 1887–88^{Note 1}: Fred Westing |
| 1888–1979 Amateur Athletic Union | 1888^{Note 1}: Fred Westing; 1889: John Owen; 1890: Fred Westing; 1891: Luther Cary; 1892: Harry Jewett; 1893: Charles Stage; 1894: Tommy Lee; 1895–97: Bernie Wefers; 1898: James Maybury; 1899: Maxie Long; 1900: William Edwards; 1901: Frank Sears; 1902: Pat Walsh; 1903: Archie Hahn; 1904: William Hogenson; 1905: Archie Hahn; 1906: Ralph Young; 1907: Harold Huff; 1908: W.F. Keating; 1909: Waring Dawbarn; 1910: Gwin Henry; 1911: John Nelson; 1912: Alvah Meyer; 1913: Howard Drew; 1914: Irving Howe; 1915: Robert Morse; 1916–17: Andy Ward; 1918: Loren Murchison; 1919: Henry Williams; 1920^{OT}-21: Charley Paddock; 1922: Al LeConey; 1923: Loren Murchison; 1924: Charley Paddock; 1925: Jackson Scholz; 1926: Tom Sharkey; 1927–28^{OT}: Charley Borah; 1929: Eddie Tolan; 1930: George Simpson; 1931: Eddie Tolan; 1932^{OT}-36: Ralph Metcalfe; 1937: Jack Weiershauser; 1938: Mack Robinson; 1939: Barney Ewell; 1940–43: Harold Davis; 1944: Charles Parker; 1945: Elmore Harris; 1946–47: Barney Ewell; 1948: Lloyd La Beach (PAN) * Cliff Bourland; 1949: Andy Stanfield; 1950: Robert Tyler; 1951: James Ford; 1952–53: Andy Stanfield; 1954: Art Bragg; 1955: Rod Richard; 1956: Thane Baker; 1957: Ollan Cassell; 1958: Bobby Morrow; 1959–60: Ray Norton; 1961–63: Paul Drayton; 1964: Henry Carr; 1965: Adolph Plummer; 1966: Jim Hines; 1967–68: Tommie Smith; 1969: John Carlos; 1970: Ben Vaughn; 1971: Don Quarrie (JAM) (*^{USA} Larry Black); 1972: Chuck Smith; 1973: Steve Williams; 1974–75: Don Quarrie (JAM) (*^{USA} Reggie Jones – both years); 1976: Millard Hampton; 1977: Derald Harris; 1978: Clancy Edwards; 1979: Dwayne Evans |
| 1980–1992 The Athletics Congress | 1980: LaMonte King; 1981: Jeff Phillips; 1982: Calvin Smith; 1983: Carl Lewis; 1984: Brady Crain; 1985: Kirk Baptiste; 1986: Floyd Heard; 1987: Carl Lewis; 1988: Larry Myricks; 1989: Floyd Heard; 1990–92^{OT}: Michael Johnson |
| 1993–onwards USA Track & Field | 1993: Michael Marsh; 1994: Ron Clark; 1995–96^{OT}: Michael Johnson; 1997: Jon Drummond; 1998: Gentry Bradley; 1999: Maurice Greene; 2000^{OT}: John Capel Jr.; 2001: Shawn Crawford; 2002–03: Darvis Patton; 2004^{OT}: Shawn Crawford; 2005: Justin Gatlin; 2006: Wallace Spearmon; 2007: Tyson Gay; 2008^{OT}: Walter Dix; 2009: Shawn Crawford; 2010: Wallace Spearmon; 2011: Walter Dix; 2012^{OT}: Wallace Spearmon; 2013: Isiah Young; 2014: Curtis Mitchell; 2015–16^{OT}: Justin Gatlin; 2017–18: Ameer Webb; 2019: Noah Lyles; 2021^{2020 OT}-22: Noah Lyles; 2023: Erriyon Knighton; 2024^{OT}: Noah Lyles; 2025: Noah Lyles |
| Notes | Note 1: In 1888 both the NAAAA and the AAU held championships; OT: The 1920, 1928, 1932, and since 1992, championships incorporated the Olympic Trials, otherwise held as a discrete event.; 2020 OT: The 2020 Olympic Trials were delayed and held in 2021 due to the COVID-19 pandemic.; *USA: Leading American athlete |

=== 400 metres ===
US National Championship winners in men's 400-meter dash
| 1876-1979 Amateur Athletic Union | 1876-77: Edward Merritt; 1878: Frank Brown; 1879-84: Lon Myers; 1885: H. Mason Raborg; 1886: John Robertson; 1887: Harvey Banks; 1888: Walter Dohm; 1888: T.J. Mahoney; 1889: Walter Dohm; 1890-92: William Downs; 1893: Edward Allen; 1894: Tom Keane; 1895-97: Thomas Burke; 1898-1900: Maxie Long; 1901: Howard Hayes; 1902: Fay Moulton; 1903: Harry Hillman; 1904: D.H. Meyer; 1905-06: Frank Waller; 1907: John Taylor; 1908: Harry Hillman; 1909: Edward Lindberg; 1910: William Hayes; 1911: Edward Lindberg; 1912: Thomas Halpin; 1913: Carroll Haff; 1914-15: Ted Meredith; 1916: Thomas Halpin; 1917: Frank Shea; 1918: Cornelius Shaughnessy; 1919-20: Frank Shea; 1921: William Stevenson; 1922: James Driscoll; 1923: Horatio Fitch; 1924: James Burgess; 1925: Cecil Cooke; 1926: Ken Kennedy; 1927: Hermon Phillips; 1928: Ray Barbuti; 1929: Reggie Bowen; 1930-31: Vic Williams; 1932: Bill Carr; 1933-34: Ivan Fuqua; 1935: Eddie O'Brien; 1936: Harold Smallwood; 1937-38: Ray Malott; 1939: Erwin Miller; 1940-41: Grover Klemmer; 1942-43: Cliff Bourland; 1944: Elmore Harris; 1945: Herb McKenley (JAM) * James Herbert; 1946: Elmore Harris; 1947: Herb McKenley (JAM) * Dave Bolen; 1948: Herb McKenley (JAM) * Mal Whitfield; 1949: George Rhoden (JAM) * Hugh Maiocco (3); 1950: George Rhoden (JAM) * Tom Cox (3); 1951: George Rhoden (JAM) * Dick Maiocco (3); 1952: Mal Whitfield; 1953: Jesse Mashburn; 1954: Jim Lea; 1955: Charles Jenkins; 1956: Tom Courtney; 1957: Reggie Pearman; 1958-59: Eddie Southern; 1960-61: Otis Davis; 1962-63: Ulis Williams; 1964: Mike Larrabee; 1965: Ollan Cassell; 1966-69: Lee Evans; 1970-71: John Smith; 1972: Lee Evans; 1973-74: Maurice Peoples; 1975: Dave Jenkins (GBR) * Fred Newhouse; 1976: Maxie Parks; 1977: Robert Taylor; 1978: Maxie Parks; 1979: Willie Smith |
| 1980-1992 The Athletics Congress | 1980: Willie Smith; 1981-82: Cliff Wiley; 1983: Sunder Nix; 1984-85: Mark Rowe; 1986: Darrell Robinson; 1987: Butch Reynolds; 1988: Tim Simon; 1989: Antonio Pettigrew; 1990: Steve Lewis; 1991: Antonio Pettigrew; 1992^{OT}: Danny Everett |
| 1992 onwards USA Track & Field | 1993: Michael Johnson; 1994: Antonio Pettigrew; 1995-96^{OT}: Michael Johnson; 1997: Antonio Pettigrew; 1998-99: Jerome Young; 2000^{OT}: Michael Johnson; 2001: Derrick Brew; 2002: Angelo Taylor; 2003: Tyree Washington; 2004^{OT}-05: Jeremy Wariner; 2006: Andrew Rock; 2007: Angelo Taylor; 2008^{OT}-09: LaShawn Merritt; 2010: Greg Nixon; 2011: Tony McQuay; 2012^{OT}-13: LaShawn Merritt; 2014: Gil Roberts; 2015: David Verburg; 2016^{OT}: LaShawn Merritt; 2017: Fred Kerley; 2018: Kahmari Montgomery; 2019: Fred Kerley; 2021^{2020 OT}-22: Michael Norman; 2023: Bryce Deadmon; 2024^{OT}: Quincy Hall; 2025: Jacory Patterson |
| Notes | Note 1: In 1888 both the NAAAA and the AAU held championships; OT: The 1920, 1928, 1932, and since 1992, championships incorporated the Olympic Trials, otherwise held as a discrete event.; 2020 OT: The 2020 Olympic Trials were delayed and held in 2021 due to the COVID-19 pandemic. |

=== 800 metres ===
US National Championship winners in the men's 800-meter run
| 1876–2016 | 1876: Harold Lambe; 1877: Romulus Colgate; 1878: Edward Merritt; 1879–80: Lon Myers; 1881: Walter Smith; 1882: William Goodwin; 1883: Tom Murphy; 1884: Lon Myers; 1885: Herbert Mitchell; 1886: Charles Smith; 1887–88: George Tracey; 1888: Wm. Moffatt; 1889: R.A. Ward; 1890: Harry Dadmun; 1891: Walter Dohm; 1892–93: Theodore Turner; 1894–96: Charles Kilpatrick; 1897: John Cregan; 1898: Thomas Burke; 1899: Herbert Manvel; 1900: Alex Grant; 1901: Howard Hayes; 1902: John Wright; 1903–04: Howard Valentine; 1905: Jim Lightbody; 1906–08: Mel Sheppard; 1909: Clar. Edmundsen; 1910: Harry Gissing; 1911–12: Mel Sheppard; 1913–14: Homer Baker; 1915: Leroy Campbell; 1916: Donald Scott; 1917: Michael Devaney; 1918: Tom Campbell; 1919: Joie Ray; 1920: Earl Eby; 1921–22: Alan Helffrich; 1923: Ray Watson; 1924: Edward Kirby; 1925: Alan Helffrich; 1926: Alva Martin; 1927: Ray Watson; 1928: Lloyd Hahn; 1929: Phil Edwards; 1930–32: Edwin Genung; 1933: Glenn Cunningham; 1934: Ben Eastman; 1935: Elroy Robinson; 1936: Charles Beetham; 1937: John Woodruff; 1938: Howard Borck; 1939–41: Charles Beetham; 1942: John Borican; 1943: William Hulse; 1944–45: Robert Kelley; 1946: John Fulton; 1947: Reggie Pearman; 1948: Herb Barten; 1949–51: Mal Whitfield; 1952: Reggie Pearman; 1953–54: Mal Whitfield; 1955–56: Arnie Sowell; 1957–58: Tom Courtney; 1959: Tom Murphy; 1960: Jim Cerveny; 1961: Jim Dupree; 1962: Jerry Siebert; 1963: Bill Crothers (CAN) * Jim Dupree; 1964: Jerry Siebert; 1965: Morgan Groth; 1966: Tom Farrell; 1967–68: Wade Bell; 1969: Byron Dyce (JAM) * Juris Luzins; 1970: Ken Swenson; 1971: Juris Luzins; 1972: Dave Wottle; 1973–74: Rick Wohlhuter; 1975: Mark Enyeart; 1976: James Robinson; 1977: Mark Belger; 1978–82: James Robinson; 1983: David Patrick; 1984: James Robinson; 1985–87: Johnny Gray; 1988: Mark Everett; 1989: Johnny Gray; 1990–91: Mark Everett; 1992: Johnny Gray; 1993–94: Mark Everett; 1995: Brandon Rock; 1996: Johnny Gray; 1997–98: Mark Everett; 1999: Khadevis Robinson; 2000: Mark Everett; 2001–03: David Krummenacker; 2004: Jonathan Johnson; 2005–07: Khadevis Robinson; 2008–12: Nick Symmonds; 2013–14: Duane Solomon; 2015: Nick Symmonds; 2016: Clayton Murphy; 2017: Donavan Brazier; 2018: Clayton Murphy; 2019: Donavan Brazier; 2021^{2020 OT}: Clayton Murphy; 2022-24: Bryce Hoppel; 2025: Donavan Brazier |
| Notes | Note 1: In 1888 both the NAAAA and the AAU held championships; OT: The 1920, 1928, 1932, and since 1992, championships incorporated the Olympic Trials, otherwise held as a discrete event.; 2020 OT: The 2020 Olympic Trials were delayed and held in 2021 due to the COVID-19 pandemic. |

=== 1500 metres ===
US National Championship winners in men's 1500-meter run or mile
| 1876–78 New York Athletic Club | 1876^{M}: Harold Lambe (CAN) * Cornelius Vought; 1877^{M}: Richard Morgan; 1878^{M}: Thomas Smith |
| 1879–88 NAAAA | 1879^{M}: Henry Pellatt (CAN) * William Duffy; 1880–83^{M}: Harry Fredericks; 1884^{M}: Percy Madeira; 1885^{M}: George Gilbert; 1886–87^{M}: Edward Carter; 1888^{M}^{Note 1}: Thomas Conneff |
| 1888–1979 Amateur Athletic Union | 1888^{M}^{Note 1}: G.M. Gibbs (CAN) * Thomas Conneff; 1889–90^{M}: Albert George; 1891^{M}: Thomas Conneff; 1892^{M}: George Orton (CAN) * Ernest Hjertberg; 1893-5^{M}: George Orton (CAN) * A.J. Walsh; 1896^{M}: George Orton (CAN) * Mortimer Remington; 1897–98^{M}: John Cregan; 1899^{M}: Alex Grant; 1900^{M}: George Orton (CAN) *Alex Grant; 1901–03^{M}: Alex Grant; 1904^{M}: David Munson; 1905^{M}: Jim Lightbody; 1906^{M}: Albert Rodgers; 1907^{M}: James Sullivan; 1908^{M}: Herbert Trube; 1909^{M}: Joe Ballard; 1910^{M}: Joe Monument; 1911–12^{M}: Abel Kiviat; 1913^{M}: Norman Taber; 1914^{M}: Abel Kiviat; 1915^{M}: Joie Ray; 1916^{M}: Ivan Meyers; 1917–23^{M} ^{OT}: Joie Ray; 1924–25^{M}: Ray Buker; 1926^{M}: Lloyd Hahn; 1927M-28^{OT}: Ray Conger; 1929^{M}: Leo Lermond; 1930^{M}: Ray Conger; 1931^{M}: Leo Lermond; 1932^{OT}: Norwood Hallowell; 1933: Glenn Cunningham; 1934: Bill Bonthron; 1935–38: Glenn Cunningham; 1939: Blaine Rideout; 1940: Walter Mehl; 1941: Leslie MacMitchell; 1942–43: Gil Dodds; 1944: William Hulse; 1945: Roland Sink; 1946: Lennart Strand (SWE) * Leslie MacMitchell; 1947: Gerry Karver; 1948: Gil Dodds; 1949–50: John Twomey; 1951: Len Truex; 1952–53^{M}: Wes Santee; 1954^{M}: Fred Dwyer; 1955^{M}: Wes Santee; 1956: Jerome Walters; 1957^{M}: Merv Lincoln (AUS) * Bob Seaman; 1958^{M}: Herb Elliott (AUS) * Ed Moran; 1959: Dyrol Burleson; 1960: Jim Grelle; 1961^{M}: Dyrol Burleson; 1962^{M}: Jim Beatty; 1963^{M}: Dyrol Burleson; 1964: Tom O'Hara; 1965–67^{M}: Jim Ryun; 1968: John Mason; 1969^{M}: Marty Liquori; 1970^{M}: Howell Michael; 1971^{M}: Marty Liquori; 1972: Jerome Howe; 1973^{M}: Leonard Hilton; 1974: Rod Dixon (NZL) * Tom Byers; 1975: Leonard Hilton; 1976: Eamonn Coghlan (IRL) *Michael Manke; 1977–79: Steve Scott |
| 1980–92 The Athletics Congress | 1980: Steve Lacy; 1981: Sydney Maree (SAF) * Steve Scott; 1982–83: Steve Scott; 1984–85: Jim Spivey; 1986: Steve Scott; 1987: Jim Spivey; 1988: Mark Deady; 1989: Terrance Herrington; 1990: Joe Falcon; 1991: Terrance Herrington; 1992^{OT}: Jim Spivey |
| 1993-onwards USA Track & Field | 1993: Bill Burke; 1994: Terrance Herrington; 1995–96^{OT}: Paul McMullen; 1997: Seneca Lassiter; 1998: Jamey Harris; 1999: Steve Holman; 2000^{OT}: Gabe Jennings; 2001: Andy Downin; 2002: Seneca Lassiter; 2003: Jason Lunn; 2004–05: Alan Webb; 2006: Bernard Lagat; 2007: Alan Webb; 2008: Bernard Lagat; 2009–10: Lopez Lomong; 2011: Matthew Centrowitz; 2012: Leonel Manzano; 2013: Matthew Centrowitz; 2014: Leonel Manzano; 2015–16: Matthew Centrowitz; 2017: Robby Andrews; 2018: Matthew Centrowitz; 2019: Craig Engels; 2021^{2020 OT}: Cole Hocker; 2022: Cooper Teare; 2023: Yared Nuguse; 2024: Cole Hocker; 2025: Jonah Koech |
| Notes | Note 1: In 1888 both the NAAAA and the AAU held championships; M: Denotes that the race was run over a mile rather than 1500 m; OT: The 1920, 1928, 1932, 1992, 1996 & 2000 championships incorporated the Olympic Trials, otherwise held as a discrete event.; 2020 OT: The 2020 Olympic Trials were delayed and held in 2021 due to the COVID-19 pandemic. |

=== 5000 metres ===
US National Championship winners in Men's 5000 m, 2 miles or 3 miles
| 1878–2016 | 1878: William Duffey; 1879: P.J. McDonald; 1880–94: Not held; 1895: Charles Bean; 1896: Ernest Hjertberg; 1897–1902: Not held; 1903–04: Alex Grant; 1905: Sanford Lyon; 1906–32: Not held; 1933: John Follows; 1934: Frank Crowley; 1935: Joe McCluskey; 1936: Don Lash; 1937: Joe McCluskey; 1938–42: Greg Rice; 1943: Gunder Hägg (SWE) * Greg Rice; 1944: Jim Rafferty; 1945: John Kandl; 1946: Francis Martin; 1947–48: Curt Stone; 1949–51: Fred Wilt; 1952: Curt Stone; 1953: Charles Capozzoli; 1954–55: Horace Ashenfelter; 1956: Dick Hart; 1957: John Macy; 1958: Alex Henderson; 1959–60: Bill Dellinger; 1961: László Tábori (HUN) * Max Truex; 1962: Murray Halberg (NZL) * Max Truex; 1963: Pat Clohessy (AUS) * Jim Keefe; 1964–65: Bob Schul; 1966: George Young; 1967: Gerry Lindgren; 1968: Bob Day; 1969: Tracy Smith; 1970: Frank Shorter; 1971: Steve Prefontaine; 1972: Mike Keough (IRL) * Dick Buerkle; 1973: Steve Prefontaine; 1974: Dick Buerkle; 1975: Marty Liquori; 1976: Dick Buerkle; 1977: Marty Liquori; 1978: Marty Liquori; 1979–82: Matt Centrowitz; 1983: Doug Padilla; 1984: Sydney Maree; 1985–86: Doug Padilla; 1987: Sydney Maree; 1988: Doug Padilla; 1989: Tim Hacker; 1990: Doug Padilla; 1991–92: John Trautmann; 1993–94: Matt Giusto; 1995–97: Bob Kennedy; 1998: Marc Davis; 1999–2000: Adam Goucher; 2001: Bob Kennedy; 2002: Alan Culpepper; 2003–05: Tim Broe; 2006–08: Bernard Lagat; 2009: Matt Tegenkamp; 2010–11: Bernard Lagat; 2012: Galen Rupp; 2013–14: Bernard Lagat; 2015: Ryan Hill; 2016: Bernard Lagat; 2017-8: Paul Chelimo; 2019: Lopez Lomong; 2021^{2020 OT}: Paul Chelimo; 2022: Grant Fisher; 2023 Abdihamid Nur; 2024: Grant Fisher; 2025: Cole Hocker |
| Notes | 2020 OT: The 2020 Olympic Trials were delayed and held in 2021 due to the COVID-19 pandemic. |

=== 10,000 metres ===
US National Championship winners in men's 10,000-meter run
| 1876–1878 New York Athletic Club | 1876–79: Not held |
| 1879–1888 NAAAA | 1880: James Gifford; 1881: W. C. Davies; 1882–83: Tom Delaney; 1884: Geo. Stonebridge; 1885: Peter Skillman; 1886–87: Edward Carter; 1888^{Note 1}: Thomas Conneff |
| 1888–1979 Amateur Athletic Union | 1888–91^{Note 1}: Thomas Conneff; 1892–93: William Day; 1894: Charles Bean; 1899: Alex Grant; 1900: Arthur Newton; 1901: Frank Kanahy; 1902: Alex Grant; 1903: Not held; 1904: John Joyce; 1905: Frank Verner; 1906: Wm. Nelson; 1907: John Daly; 1908: Fred Bellars; 1909: Harry McLean; 1910: William Kramer; 1911: George Bonhag; 1912: Hannes Kolehmainen (FIN) * Harry Smith; 1913: Hannes Kolehmainen (FIN) * Joie Ray; 1914: Ville Kyrönen (FIN) * H. E. Weeks; 1915: Hannes Kolehmainen (FIN) * Oliver Millard; 1916: Joie Ray; 1917–19: Charles Pores; 1920^{OT}: Not held; 1921–23: Earle Johnson; 1924: Ilmar Prim; 1925: George Lermond; 1926: Phillip Osif; 1927: Willie Ritola (FIN) * Russell Payne; 1928^{OT}: Joie Ray; 1929-31: Lou Gregory; 1932^{OT}: Tom Ottey; 1933: Lou Gregory; 1934: Eino Pentti; 1935: Tom Ottey; 1936: Don Lash; 1937–38: Eino Pentti; 1939: Lou Gregory; 1940: Don Lash; 1941: Lou Gregory; 1942: Joe McCluskey; 1943: Lou Gregory; 1944: Norm Bright; 1945: Ted Vogel; 1946–48: Edward O'Toole; 1949: Fred Wilt; 1950: Horace Ashenfelter; 1951–54: Curt Stone; 1955: Dick Hart; 1956: Max Truex; 1957: Doug Kyle; 1958: John Macy; 1959: 1960: Al Lawrence (AUS) * Max Truex; 1961: John Gutknecht; 1962: Bruce Kidd (CAN) * Peter McArdle; 1963–64: Peter McArdle; 1965: Billy Mills; 1966: Tracy Smith; 1967: Van Nelson; 1968: Tracy Smith; 1969–70: Jack Bacheler; 1971: Frank Shorter; 1972: Greg Fredericks; 1973: Gordon Minty (GBR) * Ted Castaneda; 1974–75: Frank Shorter; 1976: Ed Leddy; 1977: Frank Shorter; 1978–79: Craig Virgin; 1980: Rodolfo Gómez; Garry Bjorklund |
| 1980–1992 The Athletics Congress | 1981: Alberto Salazar; 1982: Craig Virgin; 1983: Alberto Salazar; 1984: Jon Sinclair; 1985: Bruce Bickford; 1986–87: Gerard Donakowski; 1988: Steve Taylor; 1989: Pat Porter; 1990: Steve Plasencia; 1991: Shannon Butler; 1992^{OT}: Todd Williams |
| 1993–onwards USA Track & Field | 1993: Todd Williams; 1994: Tom Ansberry; 1995–96: Todd Williams; 1997: Michael Mykytok; 1998: Dan Browne; 1999: Alan Culpepper; 2000^{OT}: Meb Keflezighi; 2001: Abdi Abdirahman; 2002: Meb Keflezighi; 2003: Alan Culpepper; 2004: Meb Keflezighi; 2005: Abdi Abdirahman; 2006: Jorge Torres; 2007–08: Abdi Abdirahman; 2009–16: Galen Rupp; 2017: Hassan Mead; 2018–19: Lopez Lomong; 2021^{2020 OT}: Woody Kincaid; 2022: Joe Klecker; 2023: Woody Kincaid; 2024: Grant Fisher; 2025: Nico Young |
| Notes | Note 1: In 1888 both the NAAAA and the AAU held championships; OT: The 1920, 1928, 1932, 1992, 1996, 2000, 2004, 2008, 2012 and 2016 championships incorporated the Olympic Trials, otherwise held as a discrete event.; 2020 OT: The 2020 Olympic Trials were delayed and held in 2021 due to the COVID-19 pandemic.; Distance: Until 1924 the event was 5 miles; from 1925–27 and from 1929–31 it was over 6 miles. |

=== 5K run ===
USA Championship winners in the men's 5K run
- 1979–81: Odis Sanders
- 1982–89: Not held
- 1990: Terry Brahm
- 1991–93: Not held
- 1994: Matt Giusto
- 1995: Tim Hacker
- 1996: Mark Coogan
- 1997: Marc Davis
- 1998: Dan Browne
- 1999–2001: Not held
- 2002: Meb Keflezighi
- 2003: Henry Dennis
- 2004: Tim Broe
- 2005: Adam Goucher
- 2006: Anthony Famiglietti
- 2007: Dan Browne
- 2008: Anthony Famiglietti
- 2009: Matt Tegenkamp
- 2010: Robert Cheseret
- 2011–12: Ben True
- 2013: Andrew Bumbalough
- 2014: Diego Estrada
- 2015: David Torrence
- 2016: Ryan Hill
- 2017: Shadrack Kipchirchir
- 2018: Paul Chelimo
- 2019: Anthony Rotich
- 2020: Cancelled
- 2021: Drew Hunter
- 2022: Abdihamid Nur

=== 8K run ===
USA Championship winners in the men's 8K run
- 1986–87: Jon Sinclair
- 1988: Chris Fox
- 1989: John Gregorek
- 1990: Max Harn
- 1991: Aaron Ramirez
- 1992: Jeff Jacobs
- 1993: Ed Eyestone
- 1994–2001: Not held
- 2002: Tim Broe
- 2003–04: Meb Keflezighi
- 2005: Jorge Torres
- 2006: Not held
- 2007: Anthony Famiglietti
- 2008: Jorge Torres
- 2009–10: Not held
- 2011: Bobby Mack

=== 10K run ===
USA Championship winners in the men's 10K run
- 1978: Bill Rodgers
- 1979: Herb Lindsay
- 1980: Not held
- 1981: Not held
- 1982: Bob Hodge
- 1983: Steve McCormack
- 1984: Mark Finucane
- 1985: Keith Brantly
- 1986: Dirk Lakeman
- 1987: Keith Brantly
- 1988: Ed Eyestone
- 1989: Keith Brantly
- 1990: Harry Scott Green
- 1991: Gordon Sanders
- 1992: John Trautmann
- 1993: Ed Eyestone
- 1994: Arturo Barrios (MEX)
- 1995: Keith Brantly
- 1996: Matt Giusto
- 1997: Todd Williams
- 1998: Dan Browne
- 1999: Philemon Hanneck
- 2000: Scott Strand
- 2001: Nick Rogers
- 2002: Ryan Kirkpatrick
- 2003: Bob Kennedy
- 2004: Chad Pearson
- 2005: Dathan Ritzenhein
- 2006: Not held
- 2007–09: Abdihakem Abdirahman
- 2010: Ed Moran
- 2011: Ben True
- 2012: Not held
- 2013: Matt Tegenkamp
- 2014: Christo Landry
- 2015–16: Not held
- 2017: Leonard Korir
- 2018: Bernard Lagat
- 2019–20: Not held

=== 7 miles ===
- 2002: Meb Keflezighi

=== 12K run ===
- 1987: Dirk Lakeman
- 1988–92: Not held
- 1993: Mark Coogan
- 1994–95: Chris Fox
- 1996: Mark Coogan

=== 15K run ===
USA Championship winners in the men's 15K run
- 1889: S. Thomas
- 1890: Thomas Conneff
- 1891: Edward Carter
- 1892: William O'Keefe
- 1893–94: Edward Carter
- 1895: Not held
- 1896: H. Gray
- 1897: Not held
- 1898: Thomas McGirr
- 1899: George Orton (CAN)
- 1900–02: Not held
- 1903–05: Johnny Joyce
- 1906: Not held
- 1907: John Daly (IRL)
- 1908: John Eisele
- 1909: George Bonhag
- 1910: W.C. Bailey
- 1911: Louis Scott
- 1912: Harry Smith
- 1913–16: Hannes Kolehmainen (FIN)
- 1917: Ville Kyrönen (FIN)
- 1918: Charles Pores
- 1919–20: Fred Faller
- 1921: Earl Johnson
- 1922–23: Ville Ritola (FIN)
- 1924: Earl Johnson
- 1925–27: Ville Ritola (FIN)
- 1928: Frank Titterton
- 1929: James McDade
- 1930: Gus Moore
- 1931: William Zepp
- 1932–34: Paul Mundy
- 1935–36: Robert Rankin
- 1937: Johnny A. Kelley
- 1938: Victor Dyrgall
- 1939: Ellison Brown
- 1940: Eino Pentti
- 1941–42: Joe McCluskey
- 1943: Lou Gregory
- 1944: Clayton Farrar
- 1945: Johnny A. Kelley
- 1946: Victor Dyrgall
- 1947: Fred Kline
- 1948–49: Victor Dyrgall
- 1950–51: Louis White
- 1952: John DiComandrea
- 1953: Walt Deike
- 1954–55: Browning Ross
- 1956: Rudy Mendez
- 1957: Johnny J. Kelley
- 1958: Pete McArdle
- 1959: Alex Breckenridge
- 1960: Al Confalone
- 1961: George Foulds
- 1962: Pete McArdle
- 1963: Larry Furnell
- 1964: Karl Weiser
- 1965: Merle McGee
- 1966: Doug Brown
- 1967: James Freeman
- 1968: Steve Matthews
- 1969: Garry Bjorklund
- 1970: Phil Camp
- 1971: Tom Hoffman
- 1972–73: Chuck Smead
- 1974: Frank Shorter
- 1975: Hamilton Amer
- 1976: Gary Tuttle
- 1977: Randy Thomas
- 1978: Alex Kasich
- 1979: Benton Hart
- 1980: Pete Pfitzinger
- 1981: Terry Baker
- 1982: Jeff Adkins
- 1983: Bill Rodgers
- 1984: Paul Cummings
- 1985–93: Not held
- 1994–96: Todd Williams
- 1997: Joe LeMay
- 1998–99: Todd Williams
- 2000: Dan Browne
- 2001–04: Meb Keflezighi
- 2005: Ryan Shay
- 2006: Meb Keflezighi
- 2007: Not held
- 2008: Andrew Carlson
- 2009: Anthony Famiglietti
- 2010–11: Mo Trafeh
- 2012: Christo Landry
- 2013–15: Ben True
- 2016: Stanley Kebenei
- 2017–18: Leonard Korir
- 2019: Shadrack Kipchirchir
- 2020: Frank Lara
- 2021: Clayton Young
Distance was 10 miles from 1899 to 1932

=== 10 miles ===
USA Championship winners in the men's 10-mile run
- 1997: Todd Williams
- 1998: Jimmy Hearld
- 1999: Mike Mykytok
- 2000]–02: Not held
- 2003: Chris Graff
- 2004: Dan Browne
- 2005–07: Abdihakem Abdirahman
- 2008: Not held
- 2009: Abdihakem Abdirahman
- 2010: Fasil Bizuneh
- 2011: Mo Trafeh
- 2012: Ben True
- 2013: Not held
- 2014: Christo Landry
- 2015–16: Sam Chelanga
- 2017–18: Shadrack Kipchirchir
- 2019: Futsum Zienasellassie
- 2020: Not held
- 2021: Abbabiya Simbassa
- 2022:

=== 20K run ===
USA Championship winners in the men's 20K run
- 1933: Lou Gregory
- 1934: Paul Mundy
- 1935: Ellison Brown
- 1936: Jean Berthelot
- 1937: Robert Rankin
- 1938: Lou Gregory
- 1939–40: Ellison Brown
- 1941–42: Lou Gregory
- 1943: Johnny A. Kelley
- 1944–46: Charles Robbins
- 1947: Mikko Hietanen (FIN)
- 1948–49: Victor Dyrgall
- 1950: Jesse Van Zant
- 1951: Thomas Crane
- 1952: Robert Black
- 1953: Charles Robbins
- 1954: Johnny A. Kelley
- 1955: Charles Robbins
- 1956–60: Johnny J. Kelley
- 1961: Pete McArdle
- 1962: Frederick Norris (GBR)
- 1963: Johnny J. Kelley
- 1964: Jim Keefe
- 1965: Larry Furnell
- 1966: Ralph Buschmann
- 1967: Andy Boychuk (CAN)
- 1968––69: ?
- 1970: Arthur Dulong
- 1971: Robert Fitts
- 1972: John Vitale
- 1973: Bill Rodgers
- 1974: Gary Tuttle
- 1975: Dave Babiracki
- 1976–77: ?
- 1978–79: Randy Thomas
- 1980–81: Bob Hodge
- 1982: Mike Hairston
- 1983: ?
- 1984: Ivan Huff
- 1985: Jon Sinclair
- 1986–88: Mark Curp
- 1989: Paul Gompers
- 1990: Ed Eyestone
- 1991: Mark Curp
- 1992: Paul Pilkington
- 1993: Keith Brantly
- 1994: Ed Eyestone
- 1995–96: Joe LeMay
- 1997: Brian Clas
- 1998: Terence Mahon
- 1999: Philemon Hanneck
- 2000: Todd Reeser
- 2001–02: Dan Browne
- 2003: Meb Keflezighi
- 2004: Ryan Shay
- 2005: Abdihakem Abdirahman
- 2006: Ryan Hall
- 2007: Dan Browne
- 2008: James Carney
- 2009: Brett Gotcher
- 2010: Sean Quigley
- 2011: Abdihakem Abdirahman
- 2012–13: Matt Tegenkamp
- 2014: Girma Mecheso
- 2015: Jared Ward
- 2016: Leonard Korir
- 2017: Galen Rupp
- 2018–19: Leonard Korir
- 2020: Not held

=== Half marathon ===
USA Championship winners in the men's half marathon
- 1987: Paul Cummings
- 1988: Mark Stickley
- 1989: Not held
- 1990: Mark Curp
- 1991: Jon Sinclair
- 1992: Don Janicki
- 1993: Ed Eyestone
- 1994: Rod DeHaven
- 1995: Steve Spence
- 1996: Alfredo Vigueras
- 1997: David Morris
- 1998: Rod DeHaven
- 1999: Todd Williams
- 2000: Rod DeHaven
- 2001: Dan Browne
- 2002: Peter de la Cerda
- 2003–04: Ryan Shay
- 2005: Dan Browne
- 2006: Brian Sell
- 2007: Ryan Hall
- 2008: James Carney
- 2009: Meb Keflezighi
- 2010: Antonio Vega
- 2011: Mo Trafeh
- 2012: Abdihakem Abdirahman
- 2013–14: Meb Keflezighi
- 2015: Diego Estrada
- 2016: Christo Landry
- 2017: Leonard Korir
- 2018: Chris Derrick
- 2019: Leonard Korir
- 2020: Not held

=== 25K run ===
USA Championship winners in the men's 25K run
- 1925: Albert Michelsen
- 1926: Frank Titterton
- 1927: Jacob Kaysing
- 1928: Frank Titterton
- 1929–31: William Agee
- 1932: Juan Carlos Zabala (ARG)
- 1933: Dave Komonen (CAN)
- 1934: Eino Pentti
- 1935: Ellison Brown
- 1936: Lou Gregory
- 1937: Johnny A. Kelley
- 1938: Ellison Brown
- 1939: Lou Gregory
- 1940: Ellison Brown
- 1941–44: Johnny A. Kelley
- 1945: Charles Robbins
- 1946–47: Thomas Crane
- 1948: Victor Dyrgall
- 1949: Charles Robbins
- 1950: Jesse Van Zant
- 1951: Thomas Crane
- 1952: Browning Ross
- 1953: John DiComandrea
- 1954: Nick Costes
- 1955: Browning Ross
- 1956–59: Johnny J. Kelley
- 1960–61: Pete McArdle
- 1962: Orville Flynn
- 1963: Pete McArdle
- 1964: Johnny J. Kelley
- 1965: Thomas J. Osler
- 1966: Ed Winrow
- 1967–68: Kerry Pearce
- 1969: Skip Houk
- 1970: Moses Mayfield
- 1971: Robert Fitts
- 1972–73: Paul Talkington
- 1974: Ed Mendoza
- 1975: Steve Hoag
- 1976: Frank Shorter
- 1977–78: Duncan MacDonald
- 1979: Stan Vernon
- 1980: Gary Tuttle
- 1981: ?
- 1982: Frank Plasso
- 1983: Vincent Fleming
- 1984–86: ?
- 1987: Greg Meyer
- 1988–94: Not held
- 1995: Keith Brantly
- 1996: Alfredo Vigueras
- 1997–98: John Sence
- 1999: Todd Williams
- 2000: Shawn Found
- 2001: Chad Johnson
- 2002: David Morris
- 2003–04: Dan Browne
- 2005: Brian Sell
- 2006: Fernando Cabada
- 2007–08: Brian Sell
- 2009: Dan Browne
- 2010: Andrew Carlson
- 2011: Fernando Cabada
- 2012: Joseph Chirlee
- 2013: Josphat Boit
- 2014: Christo Landry
- 2015: Jared Ward
- 2016: Christo Landry
- 2017: Dathan Ritzenhein
- 2018: Sam Chelanga
- 2019: Parker Stinson
- 2020: Not held
Distance was 15 miles from 1925 to 1932

=== 30K run ===
USA Championship winners in the men's 30K run
- 1930–31: Fred Ward
- 1932: William Steiner
- 1933: Juan Carlos Zabala (ARG)
- 1934: Lou Gregory
- 1935: Les Pawson
- 1936: Pat Dengis
- 1937: Mel Porter
- 1938: Les Pawson
- 1939: Lou Gregory
- 1940: Barney Gedwillas
- 1941: Lou Gregory
- 1942: Don Heinecke
- 1943: John Connolly
- 1944: Fred Kline
- 1945: Charles Robbins
- 1946–47: William Steiner
- 1948: Victor Dyrgall
- 1949: Jesse Van Zant
- 1950: Kim Valentine
- 1951: Victor Dyrgall
- 1952: Browning Ross
- 1953: Not held
- 1954–55: Browning Ross
- 1956–57: Ted Corbitt
- 1958: Robert Carman
- 1959: Alex Breckenridge
- 1960–62: Pete McArdle
- 1963: Norm Higgins
- 1964: Hal Higdon
- 1965: Lou Castagnola
- 1966: Ed Winrow
- 1967: Thomas J. Osler
- 1968–69: ?
- 1970: Eamon O'Reilly
- 1971: Michael Kimball
- 1972: Paul Talkington
- 1973: Robert Fitts
- 1974: Reid Harter
- 1975: John Vitale
- 1976: Bill Rodgers
- 1977: Tom Fleming
- 1978: John Vitale
- 1979: Barry Brown
- 1980: John Ziegler
- 1981: Pete Pfitzinger
- 1982: Phil Coppess
- 1983: Barry Brown
- 1984: Don Norman
- 1985: Marty Froelick
- 1986–87: ?
- 1988: Herb Wills
Distance was 20 miles from 1930 to 1932

=== Marathon ===
US National Championship winners in men's Marathon
| 1925-1979 Amateur Athletic Union | 1925: Charles Mellor; 1926–29: Clarence DeMar; 1930: Karl Koski; 1931: William Agee; 1932: Clyde Martak; 1933–34: Melvin Porter; 1935: Pat Dengis; 1936: Billy McMahon; 1937: Melvin Porter; 1938–39: Pat Dengis; 1940: Lou Gregory; 1941: Bernard Smith; 1942–43: Frederick McGlone; 1944–45: Charles Robbins, Jr.; 1946: Johnny Kelley; 1947: Ted Vogel; 1948: Johnny Kelley; 1949: Victor Dyrgall; 1950: Johnny Kelley; 1951: Jesse Van Zant; 1952: Victor Dyrgall; 1953: John Lafferty; 1954: Ted Corbitt; 1955: Nicholas Costes; 1956–63: John J. Kelley; 1964: Buddy Edelen; 1965: Garnett Williams; 1966: Norm Higgins; 1967: Ron Daws; 1968: George Young; 1969: Tom Heinonen; 1970: Robert Fitts; 1971: Kenny Moore; 1972: Edmund Norris; 1973: Douglas Schmenk; 1974: Ronald Wayne; 1975–76: Gary Tuttle; 1977: Edward Schelegle; 1978: Carl Hatfield; 1979: Tom Antczak |
| 1980–1992 The Athletics Congress | 1980: Frank Richardson; 1981: Robert Johnson; 1982: Joel Menges; 1983: Pete Pfitzinger; 1984–85: Ken Martin; 1986: Bill Donakowski; 1987: Ric Sayre; 1988: Mark Conover; 1989: Bill Reifsnyder; 1990: Steve Spence; 1991: Bill Reifsnyder |
| 1993–present USA Track & Field | 1992: Steve Spence; 1993: Ed Eyestone; 1994: Paul Pilkington; 1995: Keith Brantly; 1996: Bob Kempainen; 1997: Dave Scudamore; 1998: Keith Brantly; 1999: Alfredo Vigueras; 2000: Rod DeHaven; 2001: Scott Larson; 2002: Dan Browne; 2003: Ryan Shay; 2004: Alan Culpepper; 2005–06: Mbarak Hussein; 2007: Ryan Hall; 2008: Fernando Cabada; 2009: Meb Keflezighi; 2010: Sergio Reyes; 2011: Not held; 2012: Meb Keflezighi; 2013: Nicholas Arciniaga; 2014: Tyler Pennel; 2015: Jared Ward; 2016: Galen Rupp; 2017: Tim Ritchie; 2018: Brogan Austin; 2019: Not held; 2020: Galen Rupp; 2022: Futsum Zienasellassie |

=== 50K run ===
Champions from USATF

- 1976: Chuck Smead
- 1977: Allan Kirik
- 1978: Jack Brennan
- 1979: John Cederholm
- 1980: Bill DeVoe
- 1981: Richard Holloway
- 1982–83: Charlie Trayer
- 1984: Mel Williams
- 198–88: Not held
- 1989: John Naslund
- 1990: Barney Klecker
- 1991–98: Not held
- 1999: Mike Harrison
- 2000–01: Not held
- 2002: Dan Verrington
- 2003: Not held
- 2004: Mike Dudley
- 2005: Not held
- 2006: Jason Saitta
- 2007: Greg Crowther
- 2008–11: Michael Wardian
- 2012–13: Joseph Gray

=== 50 miles ===
Champions from USATF

- 1966: Jim McDonagh
- 1967: Thomas J. Osler
- 1968: Ted Corbitt
- 1969: Not held
- 1970: Bob Deines
- 1971: Not held
- 1972: Ross Smith
- 1973: Not held
- 1974: Max White
- 1975: Jim Pearson
- 1976: Frank Bozanich
- 1977: Jim Czachor
- 1978: Ken Moffitt
- 1979: Frank Bozanich
- 1980: Barney Klecker
- 1981: Frank Bozanich
- 1982: John Raveling
- 1983: Hector Rodriguez
- 1984: Christian Pellerin
- 1985: Michael Fedak
- 1986–96: Not held
- 1997–98: Brian Teason
- 1999: Mark Goodale
- 2000–03: Not held
- 2004: Chad Ricklefs
- 2005: Andrew McDowell
- 2006: Not held
- 2007: Mark Lundblad
- 2008: Eric Grossman
- 2009–10: Todd Braje
- 2011: Michael Wardian
- 2012: Zach Bitter
- 2013: Matt Flaherty

=== 100K run ===
Champions from USATF

- 1987: Charlie Trayer
- 1988: Rae Clark
- 1989: Charlie Trayer
- 1990: Bill Clements
- 1991: Sean Crom
- 1992: Robert Perez
- 1993: Bryan Hacker
- 1994–95: Rich Hanna
- 1996–98: Kevin Setnes
- 1999: Not held
- 2000: Howard Nippert
- 2001: Jim Garcia
- 2002: Chad Ricklefs
- 2003: Not held
- 2004: Tim Clement
- 2005–06: Not held
- 2007: Greg Crowther
- 2008: Michael Wardian
- 2009: Not held
- 2010: Matt Woods
- 2011: Andrew Henshaw
- 2012: Not held
- 2013: Nick Accardo
- 2014: Zach Bitter
- 2015: Mike Bialick

=== 100 miles ===
Champions from GBR Athletics

- 1983: Ray Scannell
- 1984: Lion Caldwell
- 1985: Don Jewell
- 1986: Lion Caldwell
- 1987: Roy Pirrung
- 1988: Not held
- 1989: Rae Clark
- 1990–2002: Not held
- 2003: Tim Clement
- 2004: Bob Sweeney
- 2005: Steve Peterson

=== 24-hour run ===
Champions from USATF

- 1988: Roy Pirrung
- 1989: Scott Demaree
- 1990: Rae Clark
- 1991: Roy Pirrung
- 1992: Not held
- 1993: Kevin Setnes
- 1994: Tommy Taylor
- 1995: Kurt Madden
- 1996: John Geesler
- 1997: David Luljak
- 1998: Kevin Setnes
- 1999: Mark Godale
- 2000: John Geesler
- 2001: Rudy Afanador
- 2002: John Geesler
- 2003: Joseph Gaebler
- 2004–05: Steve Peterson
- 2006: Alex Swenson
- 2007: Bob Sweeney
- 2008: Byron Lane
- 2009: Philip McCarthy
- 2010: Serge Arbona
- 2011: Philip McCarthy
- 2012: Jon Olsen

=== 3000 metres steeplechase ===
US National Championship winners in men's steeplechase
| 1889–1979 Amateur Athletic Union | 1889: Alfred George (GBR); 1890: William Young; 1891–92: Ernie Hjertberg (SWE); 1893–94: George Orton (CAN); 1895: not held; 1896–99: George Orton (CAN); 1900: Alexander Grant; 1901: George Orton (CAN); 1902: Arthur Newton; 1903: not held; 1904: John Daly (IRL); 1905: Harvey Cohn; 1906–15: not held; 1916: Michael Devaney; 1917–18: not held; 1919: Michael Devaney; 1920: Patrick Flynn; 1921–22: Michael Devaney; 1923: Ville Ritola (FIN); 1924: Marvin Rick; 1925: Russell Payne; 1926–27: Ville Ritola (FIN); 1928: William Spencer; 1929: David Abbott; 1930–33: Joe McCluskey; 1934: Harold Manning; 1935: Joe McCluskey; 1936: Harold Manning; 1937: Floyd Lochner; 1938–40: Joe McCluskey; 1941: Forrest Efaw; 1942: George DeGeorge; 1943: Joe McCluskey; 1944: Forrest Efaw; 1945: James Wisner; 1946: James Rafferty; 1947–48: Forrest Efaw; 1949: Curt Stone; 1950: Warren Druetzler; 1951: Horace Ashenfelter; 1952: Robert McMullen; 1953: Horace Ashenfelter; 1954: Bill Ashenfelter; 1955: Ken Reiser; 1956: Horace Ashenfelter; 1957–58: Deacon Jones; 1959–60: Phil Coleman; 1961: Deacon Jones; 1962: George Young; 1963: Pat Traynor; 1964: Jeff Fishback; 1965: George Young; 1966–67: Pat Traynor; 1968: George Young; 1969: Mike Manley; 1970: Bill Reilly; 1971: Sid Sink; 1972: Jim Dare; 1973: Doug Brown; 1974: Jim Johnson; 1975–76: Randy Smith; 1977: James Munyala (KEN) * George Malley; 1978–79: Henry Marsh |
| 1980–1992 The Athletics Congress | 1980: Doug Brown; 1981–87: Henry Marsh; 1988–90: Brian Diemer; 1991: Mark Croghan; 1992: Brian Diemer |
| 1993–present USA Track & Field | 1993: Marc Davis; 1994–97: Mark Croghan; 1998–2000: Pascal Dobert; 2001: Tom Chorny; 2002: Anthony Famiglietti; 2003: Steve Slattery; 2004–06: Daniel Lincoln; 2007: Joshua McAdams; 2008: Anthony Famiglietti; 2009: Joshua McAdams; 2010: Daniel Huling; 2011: Billy Nelson; 2012–18: Evan Jager; 2019: Hillary Bor; 2021^{2020 OT}: Hillary Bor; 2022: Hillary Bor; 2023-25: Kenneth Rooks |
| Notes | 2 mile steeplechase in 1889–1919, 1921–27, 1929–31, 1953–55 and 1957; 3000 m steeplechase otherwise.; The 1920, 1928, 1932, 1992, 1996, 2000, 2004, 2008, 2012 and 2016 championships incorporated the Olympic Trials, otherwise held as a discrete event.; 2020 OT: The 2020 Olympic Trials were delayed and held in 2021 due to the COVID-19 pandemic. |

=== 110 metres hurdles ===
US National Championship winners in men's 110 m/120 yd hurdles
| 1876–1878 New York Athletic Club | 1876: George Hitchcock; 1877–78: Edwards Ficken |
| 1879–1888 NAAAA | 1879: Edward Haigh; 1880: H.H. Moritz; 1881–82: James Tivey (GBR); 1883–84: Silas Safford; 1885–87: Alexander Jordan; 1888^{Note 1}: Al Copland |
| 1888–1979 Amateur Athletic Union | 1888^{Note 1}: Alexander Jordan; 1889: George Schwegler; 1890: Fred Ducharme; 1891: Al Copland; 1892–93: Fred Puffer; 1894–95: Stephen Chase; 1896: William Rogers; 1897: John Thompson; 1898–99: Alvin Kraenzlein; 1900: Ralph Hutchinson; 1901: Walter Fishleigh; 1902: R.H. Hadfield; 1903: Frederick Schule; 1904: Frank Castleman; 1905: Hugo Friend; 1906: William Armstrong; 1907: Forrest Smithson; 1908: Arthur Shaw; 1909: Forrest Smithson; 1910: John Case; 1911: Arthur Shaw; 1912: John Nicholson; 1913: Fred Kelly; 1914: Harry Goelitz; 1915: Feg Murray; 1916: Robert Simpson; 1917: Harold Barron; 1918: Earl Thomson (CAN); 1919: Robert Simpson; 1920: Harold Barron; 1921–22: Earl Thomson (CAN); 1923: Karl Anderson; 1924: Ivan Riley; 1925: George Guthrie; 1926: Leighton Dye; 1927: Chuck Werner; 1928–30: Steve Anderson; 1931: Percy Beard; 1932: Jack Keller; 1933: John Morriss; 1934–35: Percy Beard; 1936: Forrest Towns; 1937: Allen Tolmich; 1938: Fred Wolcott; 1939: Joe Batiste; 1940–41: Fred Wolcott; 1942–43: Bill Cummins; 1944: Owen Cassidy; 1945: Charles Morgan; 1946–47: Harrison Dillard; 1948: William Porter; 1949: Craig Dixon; 1950–51: Dick Attlesey; 1952: Harrison Dillard; 1953–54: Jack Davis; 1955: Milt Campbell; 1956–57: Lee Calhoun; 1958: Hayes Jones; 1959: Lee Calhoun; 1960–61: Hayes Jones; 1962: Jerry Tarr; 1963–64: Hayes Jones; 1965–67: Willie Davenport; 1968: Earl McCullouch; 1969: Willie Davenport & Leon Coleman; 1970: Thomas Hill; 1971–72: Rod Milburn; 1973: Thomas Hill; 1974: Charles Foster; 1975: Jerry Wilson; 1976: Thomas Hill; 1977: James Owens & Charles Foster; 1978–79: Renaldo Nehemiah |
| 1980–1992 The Athletics Congress | 1980: Renaldo Nehemiah; 1981: Greg Foster; 1982: Willie Gault; 1983: Greg Foster; 1984: Tonie Campbell; 1985: Roger Kingdom; 1986–87: Greg Foster; 1988–90: Roger Kingdom; 1991: Greg Foster; 1992: Jack Pierce |
| 1993–present USA Track & Field | 1993: Jack Pierce; 1994: Mark Crear; 1995: Roger Kingdom; 1996–97: Allen Johnson; 1998: Reggie Torian; 1999: Mark Crear; 2000–03: Allen Johnson; 2004: Terrence Trammell; 2005: Allen Johnson; 2006: Dominique Arnold; 2007: Terrence Trammell; 2008: David Oliver; 2009: David Payne; 2010–11: David Oliver; 2012: Aries Merritt; 2013: Ryan Wilson; 2014: Devon Allen; 2015: David Oliver; 2016: Devon Allen; 2017: Aleec Harris; 2018: Devon Allen; 2019: Daniel Roberts; 2021^{2020 OT}: Grant Holloway; 2022-23: Daniel Roberts; 2024: Grant Holloway; 2025: Ja'Kobe Tharp |
| Notes | Note 1: In 1888 both the NAAAA and the AAU held championships; 120 yd hurdles 1876–1927, 1929–31, 1953–55, 1957–58, 1961–63, 1965–67 and 1969–71; 110 m hurdles otherwise.; First place was shared in 1969 and 1977.; The 1920, 1928, 1932, 1992, 1996, 2000, 2004, 2008, 2012 and 2016 championships incorporated the Olympic Trials, otherwise held as a discrete event.; 2020 OT: The 2020 Olympic Trials were delayed and held in 2021 due to the COVID-19 pandemic. |

=== 200 metres hurdles ===
US National Championship winners in men's 200 m/220 yd hurdles
| 1879–1888 NAAAA | 1887–88: Al Copland |
| 1888–1979 Amateur Athletic Union | 1888–89: Al Copland; 1890: Fred Ducharme; 1891: Harry Morrell (CAN); 1892–94: Fred Puffer; 1895: Sidney Syme; 1896: Jerome Buck; 1897–99: Alvin Kraenzlein; 1900–01: Henry Arnold; 1902: Harry Hillman; 1903: M.W.H. Bockman; 1904: Joseph Hill; 1905: Frank Waller; 1906: Harry Hillman; 1907–08: John Eller; 1909: Joe Malcomson; 1910–12: John Eller; 1913: Charles Cory; 1914: Jo Loomis; 1915–16: Feg Murray; 1917–18: Frank Loomis; 1919: Robert Simpson; 1920: Not held; 1921: Earl Thomson (CAN); 1922: John Coard Taylor; 1923: Charles Brookins; 1924: Herbert Meyer; 1925: Charles Brookins; 1926: Kenneth Grumbles; 1927: Robert Maxwell; 1928: Frank Cuhel; 1929: Steve Anderson; 1930–31: Robert Maxwell; 1932: George Saling; 1933: Heye Lambertus; 1934: Philip Good; 1935: Dale Schofield; 1936: James Hucker; 1937: Allan Tolmich; 1938–41: Fred Wolcott; 1942: Robert Wright; 1943: Bill Cummins; 1944: Elmore Harris; 1945: Ronald Frazier; 1946–47: Harrison Dillard; 1948: Madill Gartiser; 1949: Craig Dixon; 1950: William Fleming; 1951: Jack Davis; 1952: Ralph Person; 1953–54: Jack Davis; 1955–56: Charles Pratt; 1957: Elias Gilbert; 1958: Fran Washington; 1959: Charlie Tidwell; 1960: Dick Howard; 1961: Don Styron; 1962: Jerry Tarr |
| Notes | In 1888 both the NAAAA and the AAU held championships; 220 yd hurdles 1887–1927, 1929–31, 1953–55, 1957–58, and 1961–62; 200 m hurdles otherwise.; The event was held on a straight track in various years, depending on the host facility |

=== 400 metres hurdles ===
US National Championship winners in men's 400 m/440 yd hurdles
| 1914–1979 Amateur Athletic Union | 1914–15: Bill Meanix; 1916: Walter Hummel; 1917: Floyd Smart; 1918: Donald Hause; 1919: Floyd Smart; 1920: Frank Loomis; 1921: August Desch; 1922: Joseph Hall; 1923: Ivan Riley; 1924–26: Morgan Taylor; 1927: Johnny Gibson; 1928: Morgan Taylor; 1929: Gordon Allott; 1930: Dick Pomeroy; 1931: Victor Burke; 1932: Joe Healey; 1933–34: Glenn Hardin; 1935: Tom Moore; 1936: Glenn Hardin; 1937–38: Jack Patterson; 1939: Roy Cochran; 1940: Carl McBain; 1941: Arky Erwin; 1942: Walter Smith; 1943–46: Arky Erwin; 1947: Walter Smith; 1948: Roy Cochran; 1949–52: Charles Moore; 1953–55: Josh Culbreath; 1956–58: Glenn Davis; 1959: Dick Howard; 1960: Glenn Davis; 1961: Cliff Cushman; 1962: Willie Atterberry; 1963: Rex Cawley; 1964: Billy Hardin; 1965: Rex Cawley; 1966: Jim Miller; 1967–68: Ron Whitney; 1969–71: Ralph Mann; 1972: Dick Bruggeman; 1973–74: Jim Bolding; 1975: Ralph Mann; 1976: Tom Andrews; 1977: Edwin Moses; 1978: James Walker; 1979: Edwin Moses |
| 1980–1992 The Athletics Congress | 1980: David Lee; 1981: Edwin Moses; 1982: David Patrick; 1983: Edwin Moses; 1984: David Patrick; 1985: Andre Phillips; 1986: Danny Harris; 1987: Edwin Moses; 1988: Kevin Henderson; 1989–90: David Patrick; 1991: Danny Harris; 1992: Kevin Young |
| 1993–present USA Track & Field | 1993: Kevin Young; 1994–95: Derrick Adkins; 1996–98: Bryan Bronson; 1999–2001: Angelo Taylor; 2002: James Carter; 2003: Eric Thomas; 2004: James Carter; 2005–06: Kerron Clement; 2007: James Carter; 2008–10: Bershawn Jackson; 2011: Jeshua Anderson; 2012–13: Michael Tinsley; 2014: Johnny Dutch; 2015: Bershawn Jackson; 2016: Kerron Clement; 2017: Eric Futch; 2018: Kenny Selmon; 2019: Rai Benjamin; 2021^{2020 OT}: Rai Benjamin; 2022-25: Rai Benjamin |
| Notes | 440 yd hurdles 1914–27, 1929–31, 1953–55, 1957–58, 1961–63, 1965–67, 1969–71 and 1973; 400 m hurdles otherwise.; The 1920, 1928, 1932, 1992, 1996, 2000, 2004, 2008, 2012 and 2016 championships incorporated the Olympic Trials, otherwise held as a discrete event.; 2020 OT: The 2020 Olympic Trials were delayed and held in 2021 due to the COVID-19 pandemic. |

=== High jump ===
US National Championship winners in men's high jump
| 1876–1878 New York Athletic Club | 1876-8: Edwards Ficken |
| 1879–1888 NAAAA | 1879: William Wunder; 1880: Alfred Carroll; 1881: C.W. Durand; 1882: Alfred Carroll; 1883: Malcolm Ford; 1884: J.T. Rinehart; 1885–87: William Page; 1888^{Note 1}: Tim O'Connor |
| 1888–1979 Amateur Athletic Union | 1888^{Note 1}: Daniel Webster; 1889: R.K. Pritchard; 1890–91: Alvah Nickerson; 1892–95: Mike Sweeney; 1896: Charles Powell; 1897–1900: Irving Baxter; 1901: Sam Jones; 1902: Irving Baxter; 1903-4: Sam Jones; 1905: Herbert Kerrigan; 1906: Neil Patterson; 1907: Con Leahy; 1908: Harry Porter; 1909: Egon Erickson; 1910: Walter Thomason; 1911: Harry Grumpelt/Harry Porter; 1912: John Johnstone; 1913: Alma Richards; 1914: Jo Loomis; 1915: George Horine; 1916: Wes Oler; 1917: Clint Larsen; 1918: Carl Rice; 1919–20^{OT}: John Murphy; 1921–22: Dewey Alberts; 1923: LeRoy Brown; 1924: Robert Juday; 1925–26: Harold Osborn; 1927: Robert King; 1928^{OT}: Robert King/Charles McGinnis; 1929: Henry Lassalette; 1930–31: Anton Burg; 1932^{OT}: Cornelius Johnson/George Spitz/Robert van Osdel; 1933: Cornelius Johnson; 1934: Cornelius Johnson/Walter Marty; 1935: Cornelius Johnson; 1936: Cornelius Johnson/Dave Albritton; 1937: Dave Albritton; 1938: Mel Walker/Dave Albritton; 1939–40: Les Steers; 1941: Bill Stewart; 1942: Adam Berry; 1943: Pete Watkins; 1944: Fred Sheffield/Willard Smith; 1945: Dave Albritton/Lester Howe/Richard Schnacke/Joshua Williamson; 1946–47: Dave Albritton; 1948: Tom Schofield; 1949: Dick Phillips; 1950: Dave Albritton/Jack Heitzman/Jack Razzeto/Virgil Severns; 1951: Lewis Hall; 1952–53: Walt Davis; 1954: Ernie Shelton; 1955: Charles Dumas/Ernie Shelton; 1956–59: Charles Dumas; 1960: John Thomas; 1961: Bob Avant; 1962: John Thomas; 1963: Gene Johnson; 1964: Ed Caruthers; 1965–67: Otis Burrell; 1968: Ed Hanks; 1969: Otis Burrell; 1970–71: Reynaldo Brown; 1972: Barry Schur; 1973–74: Dwight Stones; 1975: Tom Woods; 1976–78: Dwight Stones; 1979: Franklin Jacobs |
| 1980–1992 The Athletics Congress | 1980: Franklin Jacobs; 1981: Tyke Peacock; 1982: Milt Ottey; 1983: Dwight Stones; 1984: Jim Howard; 1985: Brian Stanton; 1986: Doug Nordquist; 1987: Jerome Carter; 1988: Doug Nordquist; 1989: Brian Brown; 1990–92^{OT}: Hollis Conway |
| 1993-onwards USA Track & Field | 1993–94: Hollis Conway; 1995–2000^{2OT}: Charles Austin; 2001–02: Nathan Leeper; 2003–04^{OT}: Jamie Nieto; 2005: Matt Hemingway; 2006: Tora Harris; 2007: Jim Dilling; 2008^{OT}: Jesse Williams; 2009: Tora Harris; 2010–11: Jesse Williams; 2012^{OT}: Jamie Nieto; 2013–16: Erik Kynard; 2017:Bryan McBride; 2018–19: Jeron Robinson; 2021^{2020 OT}: JuVaughn Harrison; 2022: Shelby McEwen; 2023: JuVaughn Harrison; 2024: Shelby McEwen; 2025: Tyus Wilson |
| Notes | Note 1: In 1888 both the NAAAA and the AAU held championships; OT: The 1920, 1928, 1932 and since 1992, championships incorporated the Olympic Trials, otherwise held as a discrete event.; 2020 OT: The 2020 Olympic Trials were delayed and held in 2021 due to the COVID-19 pandemic. |

=== Pole vault ===
US National Championship winners in men's pole vault
| 1876–1878 New York Athletic Club | 1877: George McNichol; 1878: Alfred Ing |
| 1879–1888 NAAAA | 1879–81: William Van Houten; 1882: B.F. Richardson; 1883–86: Hugh Baxter; 1887: Tom Ray (GBR) & Hugh Baxter; 1888^{Note 1}: G.B. Quinn |
| 1888–1979 Amateur Athletic Union | 1888^{Note 1}: Lincoln Godshall; 1889: Lat Stones (GBR) & D.F. O'Brien; 1890: Walter Rodenbaugh; 1891–92: Theodore Luce; 1893–94: Christian Buchholz; 1895: Hermann Thomas; 1896: Franklin Allis; 1897: Jesse Hurlburt; 1898: Raymond Clapp; 1899: Irving Baxter; 1900: Bascom Johnson; 1901: Charles Dvorak; 1902: August Anderson; 1903: Charles Dvorak; 1904: H.L. Gardner; 1905: Roy Heater; 1906: LeRoy Samse; 1907: Ed Cook; 1908: William Halpenny (CAN) & Claude Allen; 1909: Roy Paulding; 1910: Harry Babcock; 1911: Ed Cook, Frank Coyle & Sam Bellah; 1912: Harry Babcock; 1913: Stanley Wagoner; 1914: Ken Curtis; 1915: Sam Bellah; 1916: Sherman Landers; 1917: Edward Knourek; 1918: Carl Buck; 1919–20: Frank Foss; 1921–22: Edward Knourek; 1923–24: Edwin Myers; 1925: Harry Smith; 1926: Paul Harrington; 1927–28: Lee Barnes; 1929–30: Fred Sturdy; 1931: Jack Wool; 1932: Bill Graber; 1933: Keith Brown & Matt Gordy; 1934: Keith Brown, Bill Graber & Wirt Thompson; 1935: Earle Meadows & Bill Sefton; 1936: George Varoff; 1937: Bill Sefton; 1938: Cornelius Warmerdam; 1939: George Varoff; 1940–44: Cornelius Warmerdam; 1945: Boo Morcom & Robert Phelps; 1946: Irving Moore; 1947: Boo Morcom; 1948: Boo Morcom & Bob Richards; 1949–51: Bob Richards; 1952: Bob Richards & Don Laz; 1953: Don Laz & George Mattos; 1954–57: Bob Richards; 1958: Ron Morris; 1959: Don Bragg; 1960: Aubrey Dooley; 1961–62: Ron Morris; 1963: Brian Sternberg; 1964: Fred Hansen; 1965: John Pennel; 1966: Bob Seagren; 1967: Paul Wilson; 1968: Dick Railsback; 1969–70: Bob Seagren; 1971: Jan Johnson; 1972: Dave Roberts; 1973: Mike Cotton; 1974: Dave Roberts; 1975: Don Baird (AUS) * Terry Porter; 1976: Earl Bell; 1977: Mike Tully; 1978: Dan Ripley; 1979: Mike Tully |
| 1980–1992 The Athletics Congress | 1980: Tom Hintnaus; 1981: Billy Olson; 1982: Dan Ripley & Billy Olson; 1983: Jeff Buckingham; 1984: Earl Bell; 1985: Joe Dial; 1986: Mike Tully; 1987: Joe Dial; 1988–89: Kory Tarpenning; 1990: Earl Bell; 1991–92: Tim Bright |
| 1993–onwards USA Track & Field | 1993–95: Scott Huffman; 1996–97: Lawrence Johnson; 1998–99: Jeff Hartwig; 2000–01: Lawrence Johnson; 2002–03: Jeff Hartwig; 2004: Tim Mack; 2005: Brad Walker; 2006: Russ Buller; 2007: Brad Walker; 2008: Derek Miles; 2009: Brad Walker; 2010: Mark Hollis; 2011: Derek Miles; 2012–13: Brad Walker; 2014–19: Sam Kendricks; 2020 not held; 2021^{2020 OT}: Chris Nilsen; 2022-23: Chris Nilsen; 2024: Sam Kendricks; 2025: Austin Miller |
| Notes | Note 1: In 1888 both the NAAAA and the AAU held championships; OT: The 1920, 1928, 1932, 1992, 1996, 2000, 2004, 2008, 2012 and 2016 championships incorporated the Olympic Trials, otherwise held as a discrete event.; 2020 OT: The 2020 Olympic Trials were delayed and held in 2021 due to the COVID-19 pandemic. |

=== Pole vault for distance ===
- 1893: A.H. Green
- 1906: Martin Sheridan
- 1907: Martin Sheridan
- 1908: W.A. McLeod
- 1909: Harry Babcock
- 1910: Platt Adams
- 1911: Harry Babcock
- 1912: Not held
- 1913: Platt Adams
- 1914: Platt Adams
- 1915: Platt Adams

=== Long jump ===
US National Championship winners in men's long jump
| 1876–1878 New York Athletic Club | 1876: Isaiah Frazier; 1877: William Livingston; 1878: William Willmer |
| 1879–1888 NAAAA | 1879: Frank Kilpatrick; 1880–81: John Voorhees; 1882: John Jenkins; 1883–86: Malcolm Ford; 1887: Alexander Jordan; 1888^{Note 1}: Victor Schifferstein |
| 1888–1979 Amateur Athletic Union | 1888^{Note 1}: William Halpin; 1889: Malcolm Ford; 1890: Al Copland; 1891: Charles Reber; 1892: Eugene Goff; 1893: Charles Reber; 1894: Eugene Goff; 1895–97: Edward Bloss; 1898: Myer Prinstein; 1899: Alvin Kraenzlein; 1900–01: Harry McDonald; 1902: Myer Prinstein; 1903: Percival Molson; 1904: Myer Prinstein; 1905: Hugo Friend; 1906: Myer Prinstein; 1907: Daniel Kelly; 1908: Platt Adams; 1909–10: Frank Irons; 1911–12: Platt Adams; 1913: Phil Stiles; 1914: Platt Adams; 1915–16: Harry Worthington; 1917: Joseph Irish; 1918: David Politzer; 1919: Floyd Smart; 1920^{OT}: Sol Butler; 1921: Edward Gourdin; 1922–27: DeHart Hubbard; 1928^{OT}: Ed Hamm; 1929: Edward Gordon; 1930–31: Al Bates; 1932^{OT}: Edward Gordon; 1933–34: Jesse Owens; 1935: Eulace Peacock; 1936: Jesse Owens; 1937: Kermit King; 1938–39: William Lacefield; 1940–42: Billy Brown; 1943: William Christopher; 1944: William Lund; 1945: Herb Douglas; 1946–47: Willie Steele; 1948: Fred Johnson; 1949: Gay Bryan; 1950: Jim Holland; 1951–53: George Brown; 1954: John Bennett; 1955: Greg Bell; 1956–58: Ernie Shelby; 1959: Greg Bell; 1960: Henk Visser (NED) * Joel Wiley; 1961–66: Ralph Boston; 1967: Jerry Proctor; 1968–69: Bob Beamon; 1970: Bouncy Moore; 1971–72: Arnie Robinson; 1973: Randy Williams; 1974: Bouncy Moore; 1975–78: Arnie Robinson; 1979: Larry Myricks |
| 1980–1992 The Athletics Congress | 1980: Larry Myricks; 1981–83: Carl Lewis; 1984: Mike McRae; 1985: Mike Conley Sr.; 1986–87: Carl Lewis; 1988: Eric Metcalf; 1989: Larry Myricks; 1990: Mike Powell; 1991: Carl Lewis; 1992^{OT}: Mike Powell |
| 1993–onwards USA Track & Field | 1993–96^{OT}: Mike Powell; 1997: Joe Greene; 1998: Roland McGhee; 1999: Kevin Dilworth; 2000^{OT}: Melvin Lister; 2001–02: Savanté Stringfellow; 2003–04^{OT}: Dwight Phillips; 2005: Miguel Pate; 2006: Brian Johnson; 2007: Dwight Phillips; 2008^{OT}: Trevell Quinley; 2009–10: Dwight Phillips; 2011–12^{OT}: Marquise Goodwin; 2013: George Kitchens; 2014: Jeff Henderson; 2015: Marquis Dendy; 2016: Jeff Henderson; 2017: Jarrion Lawson; 2018: Jeff Henderson; 2019: Ja'Mari Ward; 2021^{2020 OT}: JuVaughn Harrison; 2022: Rayvon Grey; 2023: Marquis Dendy; 2024: Jeremiah Davis; 2025: Isaac Grimes |
| Notes | Note 1: In 1888 both the NAAAA and the AAU held championships; OT: The 1920, 1928, 1932, and since 1992, championships incorporated the Olympic Trials, otherwise held as a discrete event.; 2020 OT: The 2020 Olympic Trials were delayed and held in 2021 due to the COVID-19 pandemic. |

=== Triple jump ===
US National Champions in men's triple jump
| 1888-1979 Amateur Athletic Union | 1893: Edward Bloss; 1894-1908: Not held; 1909: Frank Irons; 1910–11: Dan Ahearn; 1912: Platt Adams; 1913–18: Dan Ahearn; 1919-20: Sherman Landers; 1921: Kaufman Geist; 1922-23: DeHart Hubbard; 1924-25: Homer Martin; 1926-28: Levi Casey; 1929: Robert Kelley; 1930: Levi Casey; 1931: Robert Kelley; 1932: Sidney Bowman; 1933: Nathan Blair; 1934: Dudley Wilkins; 1935: Rolland Romero; 1936–37: Billy Brown; 1938–39: Herschel Neil; 1940–43: Billy Brown; 1944: Don Barksdale; 1945: Burton Cox; 1946: Ralph Tate; 1947: Bob Beckus; 1948–51: Gay Bryan; 1952: Walter Ashbaugh; 1953: George Shaw; 1954: Claudio Cabreja (CUB) * Pat Lochiatto; 1955: Victor Hernandez (CUB) *Bill Sharpe; 1956: Willie Hollie; 1957: Bill Sharpe; 1958–60: Ira Davis; 1961–62: Bill Sharpe; 1963: Kent Floerke; 1964: Christos Mousiadis (GRE) * Ira Davis; 1965–66: Art Walker; 1967: Charles Craig; 1968: Art Walker; 1969: John Craft; 1970: Milan Tiff; 1971–74: John Craft; 1975: Anthony Terry; 1976: Tommy Haynes; 1977: Milan Tiff; 1978: James Butts; 1979: Ron Livers |
| 1980-1992 The Athletics Congress | 1980–81: Willie Banks; 1982: Robert Cannon; 1983: Willie Banks; 1984: Al Joyner; 1985: Willie Banks; 1986: Charlie Simpkins; 1987–89: Mike Conley; 1990–91: Kenny Harrison; 1992: Charlie Simpkins |
| 1993-onwards USA Track & Field | 1993–95: Mike Conley; 1996–97: Kenny Harrison; 1998–99: LaMark Carter; 2000: Robert Howard; 2001: LaMark Carter; 2002: Walter Davis; 2003: Kenta Bell; 2004: Melvin Lister; 2005–06: Walter Davis; 2007–08: Aarik Wilson; 2009: Brandon Roulhac; 2010: Kenta Bell; 2011–12: Christian Taylor; 2013: Omar Craddock; 2014: Will Claye; 2015: Omar Craddock; 2016-17: Will Claye; 2018–19: Donald Scott; 2021^{2020 OT}: Will Claye; 2022-23: Donald Scott; 2024: Salif Mane; 2025: Russell Robinson |
| Notes | 2020 OT: The 2020 Olympic Trials were delayed and held in 2021 due to the COVID-19 pandemic. |

=== Shot put ===
US National Championship winners in men's shot put
| 1876–1878 New York Athletic Club | 1876–78: Henry Buermeyer |
| 1879–1888 NAAAA | 1879–80: A.W. Adams; 1881–86: Frank Lambrecht; 1887: George Gray/Frank Lambrecht; 1888^{Note 1}: Frank Lambrecht |
| 1888–1979 Amateur Athletic Union | 1888–94^{Note 1}: George Gray; 1895: William Hickok; 1896: George Gray; 1897: Charles Hennemann; 1898–99: Richard Sheldon; 1900: Denis Horgan; 1901: Fred Beck; 1902: George Gray; 1903: Leon Feuerbach; 1904: Martin Sheridan; 1905–06: Wesley Coe; 1907–10: Ralph Rose; 1911–12: Pat McDonald; 1913: Lawrence Whitney; 1914: Pat McDonald; 1915–17: Arlie Mucks; 1918: Alma Richards; 1919–20^{OT}: Pat McDonald; 1921: Bud Houser; 1922: Pat McDonald; 1923: Orville Wanzer; 1924: Ralph Hills; 1925: Bud Houser; 1926: Herbert Schwarze; 1927: John Kuck; 1928^{OT}–31: Herman Brix; 1932^{OT}: Leo Sexton; 1933–35: Jack Torrance; 1936: Dimitri Zaitz; 1937: James Reynolds; 1938: Frank Ryan; 1939: Lilburn Williams; 1940–42: Al Blozis; 1943–44: Earl Audet; 1945–46: Bill Bangert; 1947–48: Jim Delaney; 1949–50: Jim Fuchs; 1951–55: Parry O'Brien; 1956: Ken Bantum; 1957: Bill Nieder; 1958–60: Parry O'Brien; 1961: Dallas Long; 1962: Gary Gubner; 1963: Dave Davis; 1964: Randy Matson; 1965: John McGrath; 1966–68: Randy Matson; 1969: Neal Steinhauer; 1970: Randy Matson; 1971: Karl Salb; 1972: Randy Matson; 1973–75: Al Feuerbach; 1976–77: Terry Albritton; 1978: Al Feuerbach; 1979: Dave Laut |
| 1980–1992 The Athletics Congress | 1980: Brian Oldfield; 1981: Dave Laut; 1982: Kevin Akins; 1983: Dave Laut; 1984: Augie Wolf; 1985: Dave Laut; 1986–87: John Brenner; 1988: Ed Wade; 1989: Randy Barnes; 1990: Jim Doehring; 1991: Ron Backes; 1992^{OT}: Mike Stulce |
| 1993–onwards USA Track & Field | 1993: Randy Barnes; 1994: C. J. Hunter; 1995: Brent Noon; 1996^{OT}–97: Randy Barnes; 1998–99: John Godina; 2000^{OT}: Adam Nelson; 2001: John Godina; 2002: Adam Nelson; 2003: John Godina; 2004^{OT}: Adam Nelson; 2005: Christian Cantwell; 2006: Adam Nelson; 2007–08^{OT}: Reese Hoffa; 2009–10: Christian Cantwell; 2011: Adam Nelson; 2012^{OT}: Reese Hoffa; 2013: Ryan Whiting; 2014–15: Joe Kovacs; 2016^{OT}-17: Ryan Crouser; 2018: Darrell Hill; 2019: Ryan Crouser; 2021^{2020 OT}: Ryan Crouser; 2022-24: Ryan Crouser; 2025: Josh Awotunde |
| Notes | Note 1: In 1888 both the NAAAA and the AAU held championships; OT: The 1920, 1928, 1932, and since 1992, championships incorporated the Olympic Trials, otherwise held as a discrete event.; 2020 OT: The 2020 Olympic Trials were delayed and held in 2021 due to the COVID-19 pandemic. |

=== Discus throw ===
US National Championship winners in men's discus throw
| 1897–1979 Amateur Athletic Union | 1897–98: Charles Hennemann; 1899–1900: Richard Sheldon; 1901: Harry Gill (CAN) * Dick Sheridan; 1902: Charles Hennemann; 1903: Joseph Maddock; 1904: Martin Sheridan; 1905: Ralph Rose; 1906–07: Martin Sheridan; 1908: Marquis Horr; 1909: Ralph Rose; 1910: Merritt Giffin; 1911: Martin Sheridan; 1912–14: Emil Muller; 1915–17: Arlie Mucks; 1918: Emil Muller; 1919: Arlie Mucks; 1920–22: Gus Pope; 1923–24: Thomas Lieb; 1925–26: Bud Houser; 1927: Eric Krenz; 1928: Bud Houser; 1929: Eric Krenz; 1930–31: Paul Jessup; 1932–33: John Anderson; 1934: Robert Jones; 1935–36: Ken Carpenter; 1937: Phil Levy; 1938: Pete Zagar; 1939–40: Phil Fox; 1941: Archie Harris; 1942: Bob Fitch; 1943–44: Hugh Cannon; 1945: John Donaldson; 1946: Bob Fitch; 1947–50: Fortune Gordien; 1951: Dick Doyle; 1952: James Dillion; 1953–54: Fortune Gordien; 1955: Parry O'Brien; 1956: Ron Drummond; 1957: Al Oerter; 1958: Rink Babka; 1959–60: Al Oerter; 1961: Jay Silvester; 1962: Al Oerter; 1963: Jay Silvester; 1964: Al Oerter; 1965: Ludvík Daněk (TCH) * Jay Silvester; 1966: Al Oerter; 1967: Gary Carlsen; 1968: Jay Silvester; 1969: Jon Cole; 1970: Jay Silvester; 1971: Tim Vollmer; 1972: Jay Silvester; 1973: Mac Wilkins; 1974–75: John Powell; 1976–79: Mac Wilkins |
| 1980–1992 The Athletics Congress | 1980: Mac Wilkins; 1981: Ben Plucknett; 1982: Luis Delís (CUB) * Mac Wilkins; 1983–87: John Powell; 1988: Mac Wilkins; 1989–90: Kamy Keshmiri; 1991: Anthony Washington; 1992: Kamy Keshmiri |
| 1993-onwards USA Track & Field | 1993: Anthony Washington; 1994: Mike Gravelle; 1995: Mike Buncic; 1996: Anthony Washington; 1997–98: John Godina; 1999: Anthony Washington; 2000–02: Adam Setliff; 2003: Carl Brown; 2004: Jarred Rome; 2005–06: Ian Waltz; 2007: Michael Robertson; 2008: Ian Waltz; 2009–10: Casey Malone; 2011: Jarred Rome; 2012–13: Lance Brooks; 2014: Hayden Reed; 2015: Jared Schuurmans; 2016–7: Mason Finley; 2018: Reggie Jagers; 2019: Sam Mattis; 2021^{2020 OT}: Mason Finley; 2022: Andrew Evans; 2023: Sam Mattis; 2024: Andrew Evans; 2025: Reggie Jagers |
| Notes | The 1920, 1928, 1932, 1992, 1996, 2000, 2004, 2008, 2012 and 2016 championships incorporated the Olympic Trials, otherwise held as a discrete event.; 2020 OT: The 2020 Olympic Trials were delayed and held in 2021 due to the COVID-19 pandemic. |

=== Discus throw – Greek style ===
- 1907: Martin Sheridan

=== Hammer throw ===
US National Championship winners in men's hammer throw
| 1876–1878 New York Athletic Club | 1876: William Curtis; 1877: George Parmly; 1878: William Curtis |
| 1879–1888 – NAAAA | 1879: James McDermott; 1880: William Curtis; 1881-2: Frank Lambrecht; 1883: Wilson Coudon; 1884-5: Frank Lambrecht; 1886: Wilson Coudon; 1887: Charles Queckberner; 1888^{Note 1}: Frank Lambrecht |
| 1888–1979 Amateur Athletic Union | 1888^{Note 1}: William Barry; 1889–96: James Mitchel; 1897-9: John Flanagan; 1900: Rich. Sheridan; 1901-2: John Flanagan; 1903: James Mitchel; 1904-5: Alfred Plaw; 1906-7: John Flanagan; 1908: Matt McGrath; 1909: Lee Talbott; 1910: Matt McGrath; 1911: Con Walsh; 1912: Matt McGrath; 1913-7: Pat Ryan; 1918: Matt McGrath; 1919–21^{OT}: Pat Ryan; 1922: Matt McGrath; 1923-4: Fred Tootell; 1925-6: Matt McGrath; 1927: Jack Merchant; 1928^{OT}: Edmund Black; 1929: Jack Merchant; 1930: Norwood Wright; 1931: Ed Flanagan; 1932^{OT}: Frank Conner; 1933: Pat O'Callaghan; 1934: Donald Favor; 1935: Henry Dreyer; 1936: William Rowe; 1937-8: Irving Folwartshny; 1939: Chester Cruikshank; 1940: Stanley Johnson; 1941: Irving Folwartshny; 1942: Chester Cruikshank; 1943-5: Henry Dreyer; 1946: Irving Folwartshny; 1947-8: Bob Bennett; 1949–51: Samuel Felton; 1952: Tom Bane; 1953: Marty Engel; 1954: Bob Backus; 1955–61: Hal Connolly; 1962-3: Albert Hall; 1964-5: Hal Connolly; 1966-8: Ed Burke; 1969: Tom Gage; 1970-1: George Frenn; 1972: Al Schoterman; 1973: Ted Bregar; 1974: Steve DeAutremont; 1975: Boris Djerassi; 1976: Larry Hart; 1977: Emmitt Berry; 1978: Boris Djerassi; 1979: Scott Neilson; 1980: Giampaolo Urlando |
| 1980–1992 The Athletics Congress | 1981: Richard Olsen (NOR), Dave McKenzie (2nd); 1982-3: Dave McKenzie; 1984-5: Jud Logan; 1986: Bill Green; 1987: Jud Logan; 1988: Ken Flax; 1989: Lance Deal; 1990: Ken Flax; 1991-2^{OT}: Jud Logan |
| 1993-onwards USA Track & Field | 1993-6^{OT}: Lance Deal; 1997: Kevin McMahon; 1998–2000^{OT}: Lance Deal; 2001: Kevin McMahon; 2002: Lance Deal; 2003-5: James Parker; 2006-9: A. G. Kruger; 2010: Jake Freeman; 2011-2: Kibwé Johnson; 2013: A. G. Kruger; 2014-5: Kibwé Johnson; 2016: Rudy Winkler; 2017: Alex Young; 2018: Rudy Winkler; 2019: Conor McCullough; 2021^{2020 OT}: Rudy Winkler; 2022: Daniel Haugh; 2023: Rudy Winkler; 2024: Daniel Haugh; 2025: Rudy Winkler |
| Notes | Note 1: In 1888 both the NAAAA and the AAU held championships; OT: The 1920, 1928, 1932, 1992, 1996, 2000, 2004, 2008, 2012 and 2016 championships incorporated the Olympic Trials, otherwise held as a discrete event.; 2020 OT: The 2020 Olympic Trials were delayed and held in 2021 due to the COVID-19 pandemic. |

=== Weight throw ===
US National Championship winners in men's weight throw
| 1876-1878 – NYAC | 1878: William Curtis |
| 1879-1888 - NAAAA | 1879–80: James McDermott; 1881: John Britton; 1882: H.W. West; 1883: Frank Lambrecht; 1884–87: Charles Queckberner; 1888: James Mitchel (IRL) |
| 1888-1979 Amateur Athletic Union | 1888–89: Wilson Coudon; 1890: Charles Queckberner; 1891–97: James Mitchel; 1898: Richard Sheldon; 1899: John Flanagan (IRL); 1900: James Mitchel; 1901: John Flanagan; 1902: Étienne Desmarteau (CAN); 1903: James Mitchel; 1904: John Flanagan; 1905: James Mitchel; 1906–08: John Flanagan; 1909: Lee Talbott; 1910: Con Walsh; 1911: Patrick McDonald; 1912: Patrick Ryan; 1913: Matt McGrath; 1914: Patrick McDonald; 1915: Lee Talbott; 1916: Matt McGrath; 1917: Patrick Ryan; 1918: Matt McGrath; 1919–21: Patrick McDonald; 1922–25: Matt McGrath; 1926–29: Patrick McDonald; 1930–32: Leo Sexton; 1933: Patrick McDonald; 1934–35: Clark Haskins; 1936–38: Louis Lepis; 1939: Stanley Johnson; 1940: Henry Dreyer; 1941–44: Frank Berst; 1945: Henry Dreyer; 1946–47: Frank Berst; 1948–49: Henry Dreyer; 1950: Frank Berst; 1951–52: Henry Dreyer; 1953–59: Bob Backus; 1960–64: Not held; 1965: Bob Backus |

=== Javelin throw ===
US National Championship winners in men's javelin throw
| 1909–1979 Amateur Athletic Union | 1909: Ralph Rose; 1910: Bruno Brodd; 1911: Ollie Snedigar; 1912: Harry Lott; 1913: Bruno Brodd; 1914–19: George Bronder; 1920–21: Milton Angier; 1922: Flint Hanner; 1923: Harry Hoffman; 1924: John Leyden; 1925: Zeke Bonura; 1926: John Kuck; 1927: Charles Harlow; 1928: Creth Hines; 1929: Jess Mortensen; 1930–31: James DeMers; 1932: Malcolm Metcalf^{Note}; 1933: Lee Bartlett; 1934: Ralston LeGore; 1935: Horace Odell; 1936: John Mottram; 1937: William Reitz; 1938: Nick Vukmanic; 1939–42: Boyd Brown; 1943–44: Martin Biles; 1945: Earl Marshall; 1946: Garland Adair; 1947–48: Steve Seymour; 1949: Bud Held; 1950: Steve Seymour; 1951: Bud Held; 1952: Bill Miller; 1953–55: Bud Held; 1956: Cy Young; 1957: Bob Voiles; 1958: Bud Held; 1959–60: Al Cantello; 1961: John Fromm; 1962: Dan Studney; 1963: Larry Stuart; 1964: Frank Covelli; 1965: Bill Floerke; 1966: John Tushaus; 1967: Delmon McNabb; 1968: Frank Covelli; 1969: Mark Murro; 1970–71: Bill Skinner; 1972: Fred Luke; 1973: Cary Feldmann; 1974: Sam Colson; 1975: Richard George; 1976: Fred Luke; 1977: Bruce Kennedy; 1978: Bill Schmidt; 1979: Duncan Atwood |
| 1980–1992 The Athletics Congress | 1980: Duncan Atwood; 1981: Bruce Kennedy; 1982: Bob Roggy; 1983: Rod Ewaliko; 1984: Curt Ransford; 1985–86: Tom Petranoff; 1987: Duncan Atwood; 1988: Dave Stephens; 1989: Mike Barnett; 1990: Vince Labosky; 1991: Mike Barnett; 1992: Tom Pukstys |
| 1993–onwards USA Track & Field | 1993: Tom Pukstys; 1994: Todd Riech; 1995: Tom Pukstys; 1996: Todd Riech; 1997–99: Tom Pukstys; 2000–07: Breaux Greer; 2008: Bobby Smith; 2009: Chris Hill; 2010: Sean Furey; 2011: Mike Hazle; 2012: Sam Humphreys; 2013: Riley Dolezal; 2014–15: Sean Furey; 2016: Cyrus Hostetler; 2017: Riley Dolezal; 2018: Curtis Thompson; 2019: Michael Shuey; 2021^{2020 OT}: Curtis Thompson; 2022: Ethan Dabbs; 2023-25: Curtis Thompson |
| Olympic Trials | The 1920, 1928, 1932, 1992, 1996, 2000, 2004, 2008, 2012 and 2016 championships incorporated the Olympic Trials, otherwise held as a discrete event.; 2020 OT: The 2020 Olympic Trials were delayed and held in 2021 due to the COVID-19 pandemic. |
| Notes | Kenneth Churchill had the longest throw in the 1932 competition (which doubled as the Olympic Trials), ahead of Malcolm Metcalf. However, Churchill qualified for the final only due to a late rule change by the U.S. Olympic Committee, allowing eight rather than five finalists. As this rule change applied only to the Olympic Trials, Churchill is considered to have won at the Trials and Metcalf at the national championships, even though they were the same meet. |

=== Pentathlon ===
USA Championship winners in men's pentathlon
- 1920: Brutus Hamilton
- 1921–22: Edward Gourdin
- 1923: Not held
- 1924: Anthony Woostroff
- 1925: Paul Courtois
- 1926: Theodore Drews
- 1927: Harry Flippen
- 1928: Not held
- 1929: Paul Courtois
- 1930: Barney Berlinger
- 1931: Jim Bausch
- 1932: Not held
- 1933–34: Eulace Peacock
- 1935: Clyde Coffman
- 1936: Arkie Trenko
- 1937: Eulace Peacock
- 1938–39: John Borican
- 1940: Harry March
- 1941: John Borican
- 1942: Not held
- 1943–45: Eulace Peacock
- 1946: Charles Beaudry
- 1947: John Voight
- 1948: Russell Thomas
- 1949–50: Wilbur Ross
- 1951–54: Brayton Norton
- 1955: Des Koch
- 1956–58: Howard Smith
- 1959: Dixon Farmer
- 1960–61: Bill Toomey
- 1962: Paul Herman
- 1963–64: Bill Toomey
- 1965: Jim Miller
- 1966: Jeff Bannister
- 1967: Lynn Baker
- 1968: Joe Hilbe
- 1969: Dave Merkowitz
- 1970: Mike Hill
- 1971–73: Rick Wanamaker
- 1974: Jack Carter
- 1975: Mike Riddle
- 1976: Mike Conti
- 1977: Mike Hill
- 1978: Joe Hilbe

=== All-Around ===
USA Championship winners in men's All-Around
| 1879-1888 - NAAAA | 1884: W.R. Thompson (CAN); 1885–86: Malcolm Ford; 1887: Alexander Jordan; 1888: Malcolm Ford |
| 1888–1979 Amateur Athletic Union | 1889–91: Alexander Jordan; 1892–94: Eugene Goff; 1895: J. Cosgrove; 1896: Lewis Sheldon; 1897: Ellery Harding Clark; 1898: E.C. White; 1899: J. Fred Powers; 1900: Harry Gill (CAN); 1901–02: Adam Gunn; 1903: Ellery Harding Clark; 1904: Tom Kiely (IRL); 1905: Martin Sheridan; 1906: Tom Kiely (IRL); 1907: Martin Sheridan; 1908: John L. Bredemus; 1909: Martin Sheridan; 1910–11: Fred Thomson; 1912: John L. Bredemus; 1913: Fred Thomson; 1914: Avery Brundage; 1915: Not held; 1916: Avery Brundage; 1917: Harry Goelitz; 1918: Avery Brundage; 1919: Harrison Thomson; 1920: Not held; 1921: Harrison Thomson; 1922–41: Not held; 1942: Josh Williamson; 1943–49: Not held; 1950: Dale Keyser; 1951: John Voight; 1952: Raymond Bussard; 1953: Bob Richards; 1954: Merwin Carter; 1955: Lyman Frasier; 1956: Charles Stevenson; 1957–59: Tom Pagani; 1960: Charles Stevenson; 1961: Bill Urban; 1962: Tom Pagani; 1963–65: Bill Urban; 1966: Brian Murphy; 1967: Bill Urban; 1968: Bill Walsh; 1969–70: Brian Murphy; 1971: Rich Robinson (athlete); 1972: Karl Harz; 1973: Norm Cyprus; 1974: Not held; 1975–76: Lloyd Sigler |

=== Decathlon ===
US National Championship winners in men's decathlon
| 1915–1979 Amateur Athletic Union | 1915: Alma Richards; 1916–19: not held; 1920: Brutus Hamilton; 1921: Dan Shea; 1922: Harrison Thompson; 1923: Harold Osborn; 1924: Tony Plansky; 1925–26: Harold Osborn; 1927: Fait Elkins; 1928–29: Ken Doherty; 1930: Wilson Charles; 1931: Jess Mortensen; 1932: Jim Bausch; 1933: Barney Berlinger; 1934–35: Bob Clark; 1936: Glenn Morris; 1937: not held; 1938–39: Joe Scott; 1940: Bill Watson; 1941: John Borican; 1942: Bill Terwilliger; 1943: Bill Watson; 1944: Irv Mondschein; 1945: Charles Beaudry; 1946–47: Irv Mondschein; 1948–50: Bob Mathias; 1951: Bob Richards; 1952: Bob Mathias; 1953: Milt Campbell; 1954–55: Bob Richards; 1956: Rafer Johnson; 1957: Charles Pratt; 1958: Rafer Johnson; 1959: C.K. Yang (TPE) * Dave Edstrom; 1960: Rafer Johnson; 1961: Paul Herman; 1962: C.K. Yang (TPE) * Paul Herman; 1963: Steve Pauly; 1964: C.K. Yang (TPE) * Paul Herman; 1965–69: Bill Toomey; 1970: John Warkentin; 1971: Rick Wanamaker; 1972–73: Jeff Bennett; 1974: Bruce Jenner; 1975: Fred Samara; 1976: Bruce Jenner; 1977: Fred Dixon; 1978: Mike Hill; 1979: Bobby Coffman |
| 1980–1992 The Athletics Congress | 1980: Bob Coffman; 1981–82: John Crist; 1983: Mark Anderson; 1984: John Crist; 1985: John Sayre; 1986: Dave Johnson; 1987: Tim Bright; 1988: Gary Kinder; 1989–90: Dave Johnson; 1991: Dan O'Brien; 1992: Dave Johnson |
| 1993-onwards USA Track & Field | 1993–96: Dan O'Brien; 1997: Steve Fritz; 1998–99: Chris Huffins; 2000: Tom Pappas; 2001: Kip Janvrin; 2002–03: Tom Pappas; 2004–05: Bryan Clay; 2006–07: Tom Pappas; 2008: Bryan Clay; 2009: Trey Hardee; 2010: Jake Arnold; 2011–13: Ashton Eaton; 2014–15: Trey Hardee; 2016: Ashton Eaton; 2017: Trey Hardee; 2018: Zach Ziemek; 2019: Devon Williams; 2021^{2020 OT}: Garrett Scantling; 2022: Garrett Scantling; 2023: Harrison Williams; 2024: Heath Baldwin; 2025: Kyle Garland |
| Notes | The 1920, 1928, 1932, 1992, 1996, 2000, 2004, 2008, 2012 and 2016 championships incorporated the Olympic Trials, otherwise held as a discrete event.; 2020 OT: The 2020 Olympic Trials were delayed and held in 2021 due to the COVID-19 pandemic. |
