= Pirrung =

Pirrung is a surname. Notable people with the surname include:

- Eva Pirrung (born 1961), German footballer
- Josef Pirrung (1949–2011), German footballer
- Roy Pirrung (born 1948), American runner
