= Tony Washington =

Tony Washington may refer to the following people:

- Tony Washington (offensive lineman) (born 1986), offensive lineman in the Canadian Football League
- Tony Washington (linebacker), American football linebacker
- Tony Washington (wide receiver), American football wide receiver

== See also ==
- Anthony Washington (disambiguation)
