= Bruno Brodd =

American javelin thrower

Bruno Brodd (July 2, 1886 – April 24, 1956) was an American track and field athlete, born in Finland, who specialized in the javelin throw. He competed for the Irish American Athletic Club and the Kaleva Athletic Club.

== 1910 American javelin champion ==
Competing for the Irish American Athletic Club, Brodd contributed to the club's victory at the 1910 AAU national championship in New Orleans, by breaking the American record for the javelin throw with a distance of 163 feet, 1 inch.

== Defeats Jim Thorpe in javelin throw ==
In 1912, he competed against the famous Native American champion athlete Jim Thorpe twice. The first time was at the 1912 Olympic pentathlon tryouts held at the Irish American Athletic Club’s stadium, Celtic Park in Queens, New York, on May 18. Brodd defeated Thorpe with a javelin throw of 157 feet, 6 inches, more than 20 feet better than Thorpe's best throw of 136 feet, 7½ inches. (Brodd came in second to Thorpe in the running broad jump, slightly over a foot behind Thorpe's jump, but Thorpe was the clear victor of the day, with first-place finishes in 3 of the 5 events).

The second time Brodd competed against Thorpe was also at Celtic Park, in the Amateur Athletic Union all-around championship, held after the 1912 Summer Olympics at Stockholm. Brodd came in third place with a total point score of 3,885 in ten events, to Thorpe's 7,476 points. (John Bredemus, who won the AAU All-Around Championship in 1908, was second with 6,303 points).

== 1913 American javelin champion ==
In 1913, at the 19th Annual New York Athletic Club Games, held at Travers Island on June 14, Brodd regained the American record for the javelin throw, with a distance of 169 feet, 10 ¼ inches.

In 1914, Brodd's American record for the javelin throw was beaten by Harry Liversedge, and his AAU meet record was beaten by George Bronder, who became another champion javelin thrower of the Irish American Athletic Club. Bronder held the AAU meet record from 1914 to 1920, and the American javelin throw record from 1916 to 1920.
