= 1888 AAA Championships =

Outdoor track and field competition

- Dates: 30 June 1888
- Host city: Crewe, England
- Venue: Alexandra Recreation Ground
- Level: Senior
- Type: Outdoor
- Events: 14

The 1888 AAA Championships was an outdoor track and field competition organised by the Amateur Athletic Association (AAA), held on Saturday 30 June 1888 at the Alexandra Recreation Ground in Crewe, England in front of 10,000 spectators.

The 14 events were the same number and disciplines as in the previous year.

== Results ==
Event	Gold		Silver		Bronze	
100 yards	(United States) Frederick Westing	10.2	(Leinster) Alfred Vigne	¾ yd	Frank Ritchie	½ yd
440 yards	Henry Tindall	51.4	W. Lock	6 yd	Ernest Pelling	1 yd
880 yards	Alfred Le Maitre	2.00.4	(Australia) Wilfrid Kent-Hughes	4 yd	(United States) Charles Smith	5 yd
1 mile	(United States) Thomas Conneff	4.31.6	William Pollock-Hill	5 yd	James Kibblewhite	3 yd
4 miles	Edward Parry	20.22.2	Sidney Thomas	20.40.6	only 2 finished	
10 miles	Edward Parry	53.43.4	Sidney Thomas	54.31.0	George Pennington	55.25.0
steeplechase	J.C. Cope	12.13.0	n/a	n/a	only 1 finished	
120yd hurdles	Sherard Joyce	16.0	Charles Daft	2 yd	F. Winters	3 yd
7 miles walk	(United States) Christopher Clarke	57.08.6	J.R. Lewis	57.41.0	only 2 finished	
high jump	George Rowdon	1.727	Tom Ray	1.575	only 2 competed	
pole jump	Tom Ray & Lat Stones	3.36	not awarded		only 2 competed	
long jump	(United States) Alexander Jordan	6.62	(United States) Charles Smith	5.33	only 2 competed	
shot put	(Canada) George Gray	13.28	(Leinster) James Mitchel	12.34	(Leinster) John Carroll Daly	12.11
hammer throw	(Leinster) James Mitchel	38.00	(Leinster) John Carroll Daly	34.34	Robert Lindsay	29.22
