= Malcolm Webster Ford =

American decathlete

- Born: February 7, 1862; Brooklyn, New York, U.S.
- Died: May 8, 1902 (aged 40); Manhattan, New York, U.S.
- Spouse: Janet Wilhelmina Graves (m. 1892; div. 1898)
- Children: Malcolm W. Ford Jr.
- Relatives: Paul Leicester Ford (brother); Worthington C. Ford (brother); William C. Fowler (grandfather)

Malcolm Webster Ford (February 7, 1862 – May 8, 1902) was an American athlete and journalist best known for the murder-suicide where he shot his brother Paul and then himself.

== Early life ==
Ford was born in Brooklyn on February 7, 1862. He was the second of three sons born to Emily Ellsworth (née Fowler) Ford (1826–1893) and Gordon Lester Ford (1823–1891), a lawyer who owned a library comprising 100,000 books and 60,000 manuscripts, dealing mainly with colonial and revolutionary American history. His two brothers were noted historian Worthington Chauncey Ford and novelist and biographer Paul Leicester Ford, who suffered a spinal injury in early youth that prevented him from attending school.

Through their maternal grandmother, the former Harriet Webster (wife of scholar William Chauncey Fowler), the three Ford brothers were great-grandsons of lexicographer and textbook pioneer Noah Webster. Their mother, the former Emily Ellsworth Fowler, was a lifelong friend of Emily Dickinson.

== Career ==
In his heyday during the 1880s, he was three times the American National Champion as "All Around Athlete", a competition which was the equivalent of today's decathlon. The event consisted of ten events (three of which are different from those which are run today). He also excelled in individual events. In 1885 and 1886 he was the winner at the National Championships of the long jump and 100 and 200 yard dash, a "triple" which was not accomplished again until Carl Lewis did it in 1983.

In 1891, Ford tied with Daniel Delany Bulger in the long jump event at the 1891 AAA Championships.

Ford's father and the Ford family strongly opposed his participation in athletics and he was disinherited because of his refusal to give up competition. He also twice endured scandals for competing as a professional and was banned from amateur competition.

During his marriage, Malcolm was employed as a business executive. At other times he worked as a journalist (his articles on track and field events were published in Outing magazine). He launched his own publications twice, but both were failures.

== Personal life ==
In 1892, Ford was married to Janet Wilhelmina Graves, a Brooklyn heiress. Janet's sister Marie (née Graves) Harjes, was the first wife of Henry Herman Harjes, the partner of J.P. Morgan in Paris. Before the couple divorced in 1898, they had one child together:

- Malcolm Webster Ford Jr. (1896–1975), who married Mary (née Chesnut) Snow (1901–2000), a daughter of Judge W. Calvin Chesnut, in 1934.

On May 8, 1902, Ford went to 37 East 77th Street, his brother Paul's residence in Manhattan, and fatally shot him in his library before shooting himself. Ford was said to be in a dire financial condition and his brother had refused him further financial aid. An inquest ruled "temporary insanity". The brothers were buried at Sleepy Hollow Cemetery in Sleepy Hollow, New York, in the same grave; the decision for the same grave was made by the families to signal the end of their familial feud.
