= Paul Herman (decathlete) =

American decathlete

Paul Irvin Herman
Personal information
- Full name: Paul Irvin Herman
- Nationality: American
- Born: March 7, 1941 (age 85) Reserve, Kansas, United States

Sport
- Sport: Athletics
- Event: Decathlon

Paul Herman (born March 7, 1941) is an American athlete. He competed in the men's decathlon at the 1964 Summer Olympics.
