= Mo Trafeh =

American long-distance runner

Mo Trafeh (born 1 May 1985) is an American former long distance runner.

== 2010 season ==
He won the 2010 US 15 km Championship.

== 2011 season ==
He won the 2011 USA Half Marathon Championships defeating Ryan Hall, Jorge Torres, Patrick Smyth, Fasil Bizuneh, Mike Sayenko, and Ryan Vail.

Trafeh also won the 2011 US 15 km Championship defeating Ben True, Robert Cheseret, Scott Bauhs, Ryan Vail, Jorge Torres, and Fasil Bizuneh.

He additionally won the 2011 US 10 Mile Championship defeating Ben True, Ed Moran, Abdi Abdirahman, Ryan Vail, Max King, and Carlos Trujillo.

== 2012 and beyond ==
Trafeh was caught using performance-enhancing drugs and had results stripped from 2012-2014 and was given a four-year ban.

As a result, Trafeh retired in 2014.
