= Anthony Washington =

Anthony Washington may refer to:

- Anthony Washington (American football) (born 1958), American football player
- Anthony Washington (discus thrower) (born 1966), American discus thrower
- Anthony Washington (basketball) (born 1983), American basketball player

== See also ==
- Tony Washington (disambiguation)
