= Arlie Mucks =

American athlete (1891–1967)

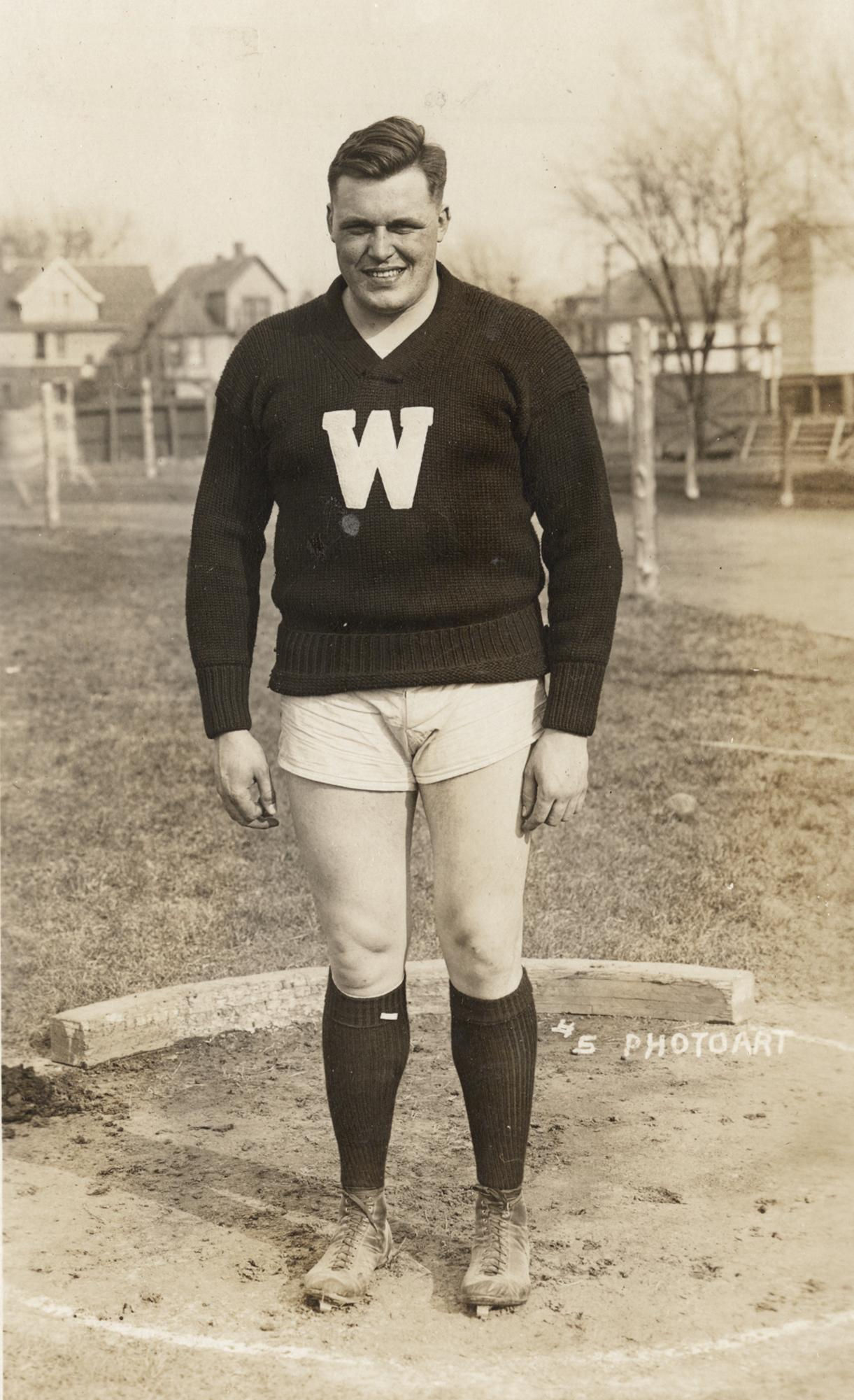
Mucks c. 1912 – c. 1917

Arlie Max Mucks (December 10, 1891 – July 10, 1967) was an American track and field athlete who competed in the 1912 Summer Olympics.

In 1912 he finished sixth in the discus throw event and 15th in the two handed discus throw competition. In 1916, he added five feet to the college discus record, throwing 145 feet 11 1/2 inches at the Penn Relays. He was inducted in the Wisconsin Athletic Hall of Fame in 1964.

He died in Oshkosh, Wisconsin.
