= William Chauncey Fowler =

American politician

William Chauncey Fowler (September 1, 1793 – January 15, 1881) was an American scholar.

Fowler, second son of Reuben R. and Catharine (Chauncey) Fowler, was born in Killingworth, now Clinton, Connecticut, September 1, 1793. In 1797 his parents removed to Durham, and in his fifteenth year he went to Middletown, Connecticut, where for nearly two years he was engaged as a clerk in a store. In the meantime his parents had removed to East Guilford, now Madison, where he was prepared for college.

He graduated from Yale College in 1816. Before his graduation he was appointed Rector of the Hopkins Grammar School, in New Haven, and he acted in that capacity during the last term of the college course. By these double duties his health was impaired, and in November, 1816, he went South for a year, spending the time as private tutor in a family in Fauquier County, Va. He then resumed his position as Rector of the Grammar School, beginning also the study of theology under Professor Fitch. He was appointed in 1819 a Tutor at Yale, and filled that office for five years lacking one term. During this period he was licensed to preach, and on August 31, 1825, was ordained pastor of the Congregational Church in Greenfield, Massachusetts. In 1827 he was dismissed, to accept the appointment of Professor of Chemistry and Natural History, in Middlebury College, Vermont, where he remained till 1838, when he went to Amherst College, in Massachusetts, as Professor of Rhetoric. He resigned this professorship in 1843, but continued to reside in Amherst till 1858, when he removed to Durham, Connecticut, where he died, after a brief illness, of pneumonia, January 15, 1881, in his 88th year.

From the time of his resignation as Professor, he was engaged in preparing various works for the press. In 1845 he edited the university edition of Webster's Dictionary (octavo). He next prepared three volumes, composing a series of English Grammars, the first of the series (entitled The English Language in its Elements and Forms., N. Y, 1850, octavo) being a work of great labor. In 1858 he published Memorials of the Chaunceys; in 1863, The Sectional Controversy; in 1866, a History of Durham; in 1872, a treatise on Local Law in Massachusetts and Connecticut; and later several collections of Essays.

The degree of LL.D. was conferred upon him by Lafayette College in 1861. In 1850 he was elected to the Massachusetts Legislature from the town of Amherst. He represented the 18th district of Connecticut in the Connecticut State Senate in 1864.

Professor Fowler was married, July 21, 1825, to Harriet, third daughter of Dr. Noah Webster, and widow of Edward Cobb, of Portland, Me.; she died in Amherst, March 30, 1844. Of their four children, one son died in early childhood, and another in middle life. The remaining son and one daughter survived them.
