= Lou Gregory =

American long-distance runner

Personal information
- Full name: Louis Paul Gregory
- Nationality: American
- Born: July 10, 1902
- Died: April 21, 1989 (aged 86)

Sport
- Sport: Long-distance running
- Event: 10,000 metres

Louis Paul Gregory (July 10, 1902 – April 21, 1989) was an American long-distance runner. He competed in the men's 10,000 metres at the 1932 Summer Olympics.
