= Thomas Conneff =

Irish/American athlete

Personal information
- Born: 21 December 1867 Kilmurray, Clane Co. Kildare, Ireland
- Died: ca. 1910 United States

Sport
- Sport: Athletics
- Event: 1 mile

Thomas Conneff (21 December 1867 - ca. 1910) was an amateur Irish runner who held the amateur record for the fastest mile (4:15 3/5) from 1895 to 1911.

== Biography ==
Thomas "Tommy" Conneff was born in Kilmurray, Clane Co. Kildare to James and Marcella (nee Rourke) Conneff. He emigrated to the United States in 1888 and generally specialized in longer distances, winning the national 10-mile championship four years in a row starting in 1888.

He also ran the mile and won national titles in 1888 and 1891, but did not truly start to dominate the event until 1893, when under the coaching of Mike Murphy, he improved his mile form to emerge as a top amateur miler. He was a member of the Manhattan Athletic Club. In addition to his U.S.A. national titles he won the 1 mile event at the prestigious 1888 AAA Championships.

On 26 August 1893, at Holmes Field in Cambridge Mass., Conneff, representing Holy Cross Lycuem, started from scratch and easily overtook other runners who had long starts. His first lap split time was 59 seconds, his second lap 2:00. After three laps, he was at 3:07. He started to fall off his pace as he finished the race, but he nevertheless set a new amateur record of 4:17 4/5. (Walter George had run 4:12 3/4 in 1886 as a professional.)

That record lasted to 1895 as Frederick Bacon ran 4:17 at the AAA Championships at Stamford Bridge, London on 6 July.

Conneff wanted to regain his record, so after a 4:21 tune-up on 10 August at Weehawken, New Jersey, he ran a 3/4 mile race at Travers Island, New York on 21 August in 3:02 4/5, a time which would not be bettered for 36 years.

Returning to Travers Island a week later, Conneff was paced by 4:21 1/5 miler George Orton, who led him to the quarter in 62 2/5 and the half in 2:06 3/5. At the 3/4 mark, Conneff was at 3:10 4/5. Two-time AAU champion Eddie Carter paced Conneff for the last 300 yards as Conneff started to slow. He crossed the finish line and stopped the clock at 4:15 3/5 to regain his amateur mile record.

He followed that record run on 21 September with a race against some of the top British runners. He ran a first-lap 65, then was at 2:10 3/5 at the half, again paced by Orton. William Lutyens, who had run a 4:19 4/5 the year before and had paced Bacon to his record, was forced to drop out of the race, leaving Conneff to trot home in 4:18 1/5.

Reporter William B. Curtis described Conneff after the race: "He never was in such fine mettle as during the past four weeks. He could at any time have beaten his own world's best amateur record of 4:15 3/5 and might have equalled or surpassed the world's best professional record, 4:12 3/4... He is one of those athletes who speedily makes their handlers go gray-haired, is restive under the restrictions of training, and prone to stray outside the bounds laid down for athletic aspirants. He is now 29 years old and can hardly hope to improve hereafter."

His amateur mile record would stand until 1911.
