= Charles Hennemann =

American athlete

Charles Henry Henneman (February 15, 1866 – June 23, 1938) was an American track and field athlete who competed in the 1904 Summer Olympics. Born in Iowa, in 1904 he was finished fourth in 56 pound weight throw competition.
