= John Owen (athlete) =

American athlete

John Owen, Jr. (August 18, 1861 – August 25, 1924) was an American athlete and businessman.

== Biography ==
John Owen was born in Detroit, and took up athletics in 1889 at the age of 28. He was discovered and coached by Mike Murphy at the Detroit Athletic Club. In 1890, he ran the 100-yard dash in a world record time of 9.8 seconds.

Owen died on August 25, 1924, after a horseback riding accident at his summer home on Mackinac Island.
