= Roy Cochran =

Roy Cochran may refer to:

- Roy Cochran (athlete) (1919–1981), American sprinter and hurdler
- Roy Cochran (politician) (1886–1963), American politician from Nebraska
