= Bernard Wefers =

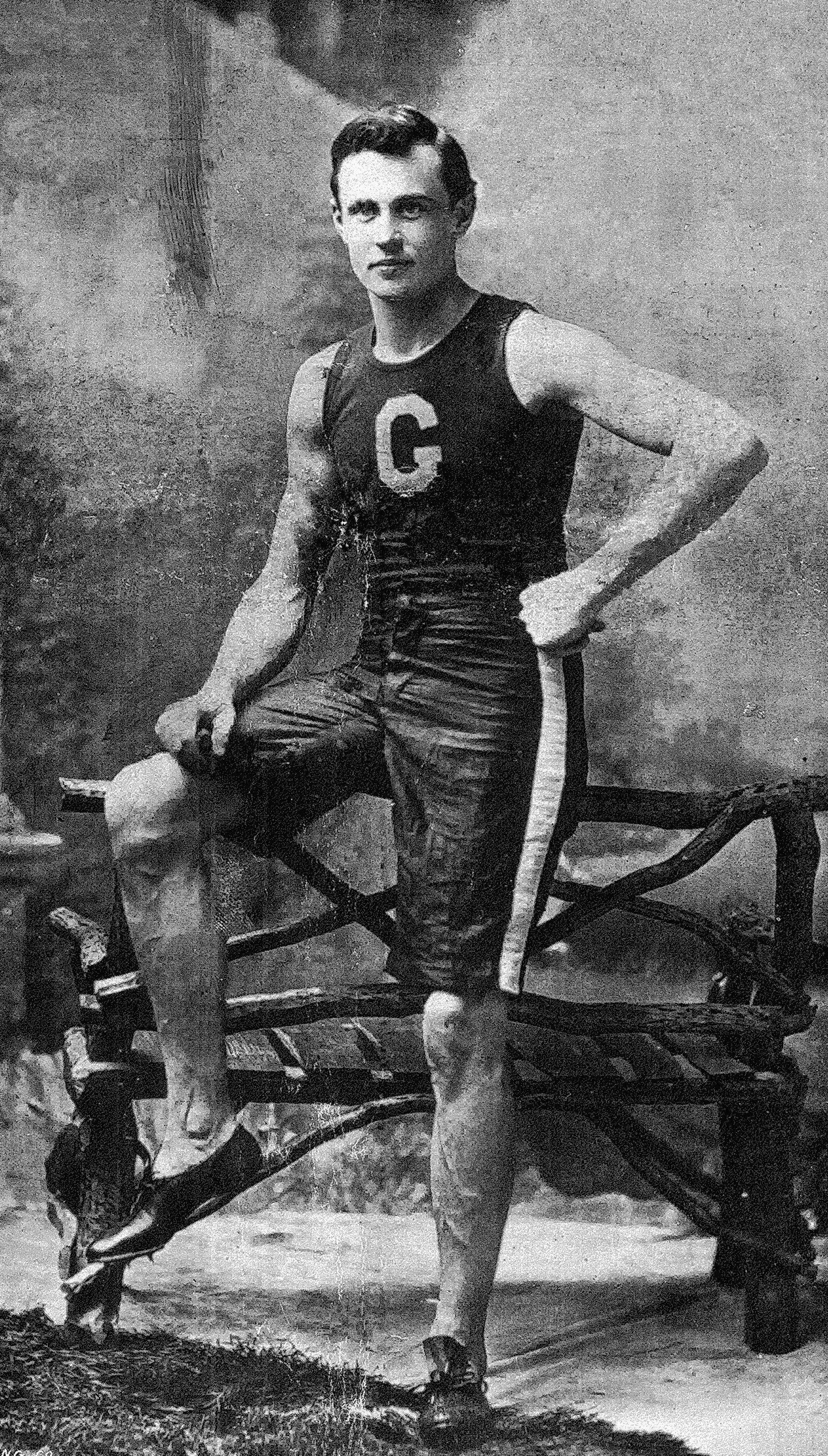
- Bernard Wefers c. 1897

Personal information
- Full name: Bernard Joseph Wefers Sr.
- Born: February 19, 1873 Lawrence, Massachusetts, U.S.
- Died: April 18, 1957 (aged 84) New York City, U.S.

Sport
- Sport: Athletics
- Event: 100–400 m

Achievements and titles
- Personal best(s): 100 m – 10.6 (1897); 200 m – 21.7 (1896); 400 m – 48.9 (1896)

Bernard Joseph Wefers Sr. (February 19, 1873 – April 18, 1957) was an American sprint runner.

He was born in Lawrence, Massachusetts and attended Boston College before transferring to study medicine at Georgetown University. During the 1890s he won numerous sprint records and was dubbed the "World's Fastest human". In 1896 he set a world record in the 220 yards (200 metres) dash with a time of 21.2 seconds. This record stood until 1921, although it was tied by five other athletes. After retiring, Wefers coached track and field at NYAC for 45 years.

Wefers died in 1957 in New York City.
