= Leonard Hilton =

American long-distance runner

Personal information
- Full name: Leonard Lane Hilton
- Born: September 28, 1947 Hillsboro, Texas, United States
- Died: July 3, 2000 (aged 52)

Sport
- Sport: Long-distance running
- Event: 5000 metres

Leonard Lane Hilton (September 28, 1947 – July 3, 2000) was an American long-distance runner.

Hilton was born in Hillsboro, Texas, and graduated from Austin High School in Houston. He attended the University of Houston; competing for the Cougars in 1970, he anchored a team that set a world record in the indoor distance medley relay in 1970. Hilton earned a degree in engineering from Houston. Hilton competed in the men's 5000 metres at the 1972 Summer Olympics. He was the first runner from Texas to break the four-minute mile. While working as a business executive in the energy field, Hilton died of pancreatic cancer in 2000.
