= Tom Ottey =

American long-distance runner

Personal information
- Full name: Thomas Charles Ottey
- Nationality: American
- Born: June 8, 1910
- Died: April 10, 1984 (aged 73)

Sport
- Sport: Long-distance running
- Event: 10,000 metres

Thomas Charles Ottey (June 8, 1910 – April 10, 1984) was an American long-distance runner. He competed in the men's 10,000 metres at the 1932 Summer Olympics.

Ottey was an All-American for the Michigan State Spartans track and field team, finishing 2nd in the 3000 meters at the 1935 NCAA Track and Field Championships.
