= Thomas J. Osler =

American mathematician (1940–2023)

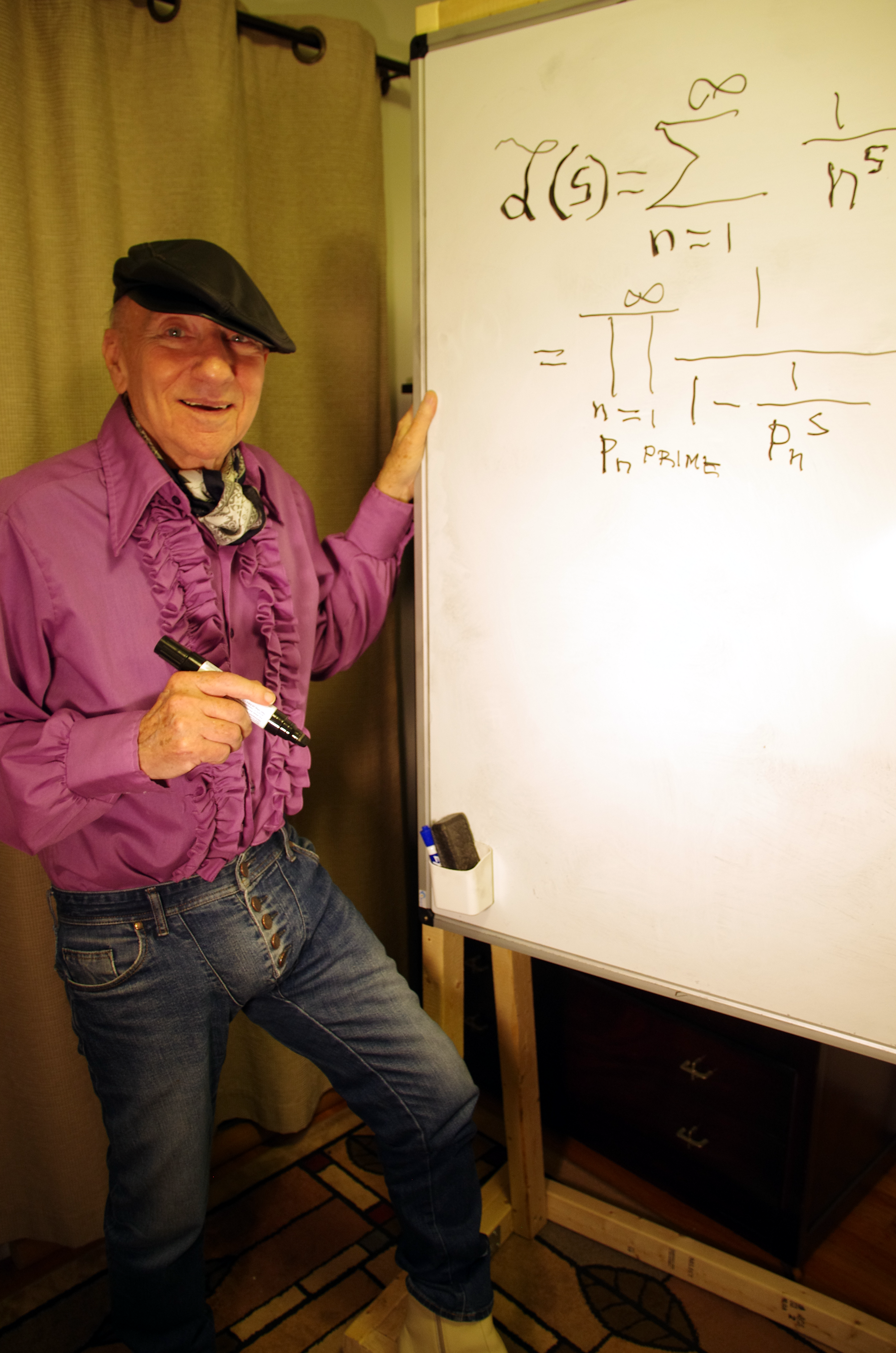
- Osler at whiteboard in 2020
- Born: April 26, 1940; Camden, New Jersey, U.S.
- Died: March 26, 2023 (aged 82)
- Education: Drexel University (BS) New York University (PhD)
- Scientific career
- Fields: Mathematics
- Workplaces: Rowan University

Thomas Joseph Osler (April 26, 1940 – March 26, 2023) was an American mathematician, national champion distance runner, and author.

== Early life and education ==
Born in 1940 in Camden, New Jersey, Osler was a graduate of Camden High School in 1957 and then studied physics at Drexel University, graduating in 1962. He completed his PhD at the Courant Institute of Mathematical Sciences of New York University, in 1970. His dissertation, Leibniz Rule, the Chain Rule, and Taylor's Theorem for Fractional Derivatives, was supervised by Samuel Karp.

== Career ==
Osler taught at Saint Joseph's University and the Rensselaer Polytechnic Institute before joining the mathematics department at Rowan University in New Jersey in 1972; he was a full professor at Rowan University until his death.

In mathematics, Osler is best known for his work on fractional calculus. He also gave a series of product formulas for $\pi$ that interpolate between the formula of Viète and that of Wallis.

In 2009, the New Jersey Section of the Mathematical Association of America gave him their Distinguished Teaching Award. A mathematics conference was held at Rowan University in honor of his 70th birthday in 2010.

=== Running ===
Osler won three national Amateur Athletic Union championships at 25 km (1965), 30 km and 50 mi (1967). Osler won the 1965 Philadelphia Marathon, finishing the race in freezing-cold weather in a time of 2:34:07.

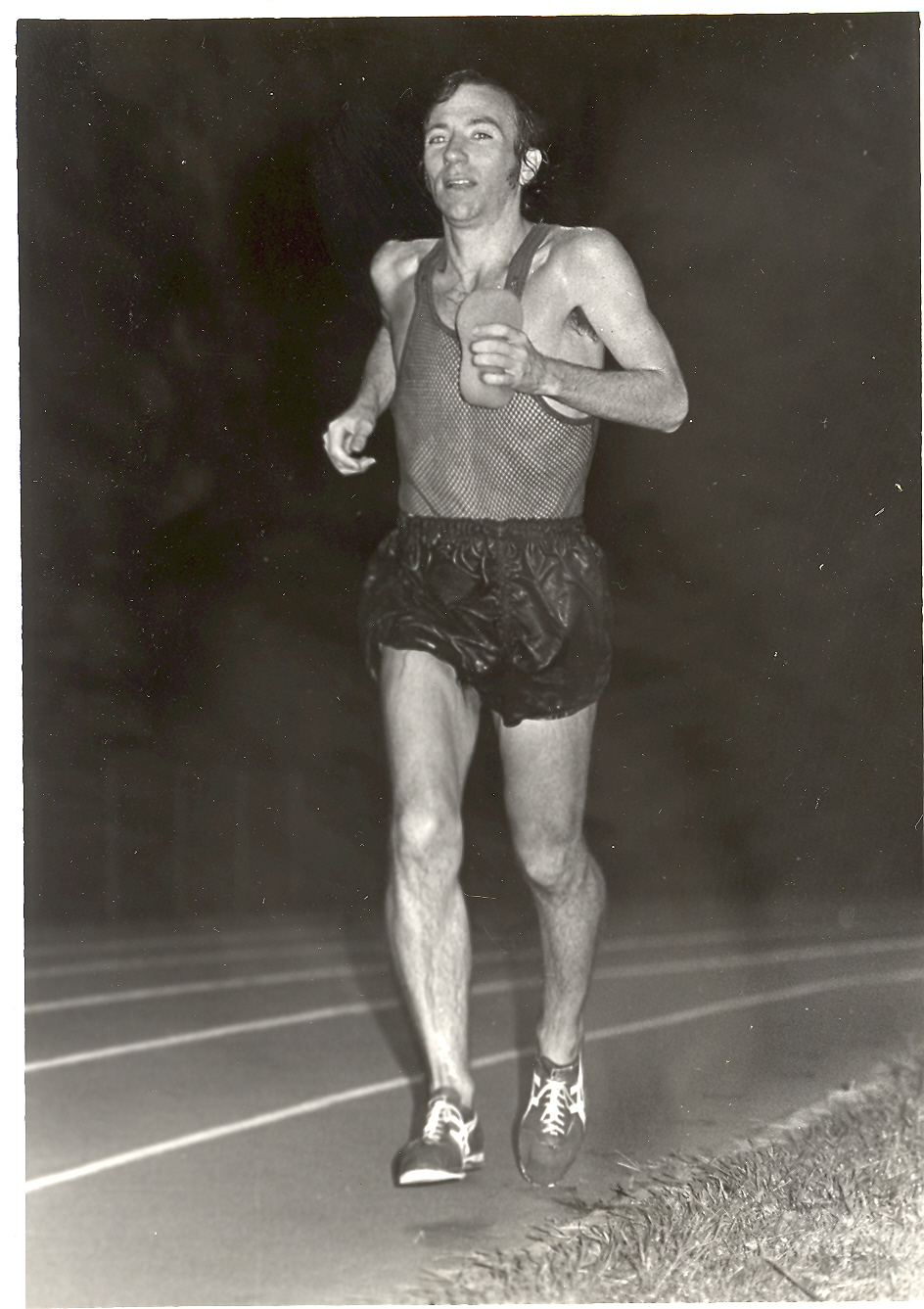
Osler during 50-mile track race at Fort Meade in 1975

Osler was involved in the creation of the Road Runners Club of America with Olympian Browning Ross; together they were elected as co-secretaries in 1959 and were among the four first official elected officers of the newly formed club. He served on the Amateur Athletic Union Standards Committee in 1979. He has been credited with helping to popularize the idea of walk breaks among US marathon runners.

In 1980, Osler was inducted into the Road Runners Club of America Hall of fame.

=== Running publications ===
Osler was the author of several books and booklets on running:

- Guide to Long Distance Running (a 20-page booklet coauthored with Edward Dodd) was published in 1965 by the South Jersey Track Club.
- The Conditioning of Distance Runners (a 29-page booklet) was published in 1967 by the Long Distance Log. It was reprinted in 1984–1985 in Runner's World magazine and reprinted with a new foreword by Amby Burfoot in 2019.
- Serious Runner's Handbook: Answers to Hundreds of your Running Questions (187 pages) was published by World Publications in 1978.
- Ultramarathoning: The Next Challenge (299 pages, coauthored with Edward Dodd) was also published by World Publications, in 1979.

== Personal life and death ==
Osler was a resident of Glassboro, New Jersey.

Osler died on March 26, 2023, at the age of 82.
