= George Gray (shot putter) =

Canadian shot putter (1865–1933)

Personal information
- Nationality: Canadian
- Born: May 4, 1865 Coldwater, Ontario, Canada
- Died: January 7, 1933
- Height: 1.79 m (5 ft 10 in)
- Weight: 85 kg (187 lb)

Sport
- Sport: Athletics
- Event: Shot put

Achievements and titles
- Personal bests: shot put, WB=14.75 m

George Gray (1865–1933) was a Canadian shot putter who held the world record of 43 feet 11 inches (13.39 m) from 1887 through 1902. He earned 188 first place medals and trophies through his career along with national titles in Canada, the United States, England, and Ireland.

== Biography ==
Gray was raised in Coldwater, Ontario, Canada and first competed in the shot put in 1885. Gray won the prestigious British AAA Championships shot put event at the 1888 AAA Championships.

On 24 May 1889 he is recorded as being recognized as the first Canadian athlete to set a world best in an athletics event with a shot put distance of 45' 2".(Note: 45' 1 3/4".).

He won the shot put title AAU (United States National) Championship 10 times: 1887–1894, 1896 and 1902, the record number of wins in that event.

He was, remarkably, to remain unbeaten throughout his career and held the world's best mark until early the next century (to 1902; 1904).

He is reported as working as a manager in the Lumber industry and was also a candidate for post of Chief of the Toronto Fire Brigade, for which he was not successful.

In 1973, Gray was inducted into Canada's Sports Hall of Fame and is recognized as one of Canada's most important early athletes. The trophy he won at the 1887 World Fair is one of exhibits held by the Canadian Sports Hall of Fame.

== World Best Marks ==
There were no official world records until the formation of the International Association of Athletics Federations (IAAF) in 1912. However, world best marks before that are universally recognized.

Gary recorded 8 such world best marks:

- 13.38 m (43 ft 10 3/4 in) at New York on 22 September 1888.
- 13.76 m (45 ft 1 3/4 in) at Barrie on 24 May 1889.
- 14.07 m (46 ft 2 in) at New York on 20 September 1890.
- 14.11 m (46 ft 3 1/2 in) at Saint Catherine's on 10 August 1891.
- 14.12 m (46 ft 4 in) at New York on 12 September 1891.
- 14.22 m (46 ft 7 3/4 in) at New York on 19 September 1891.
- 14.32 m (46 ft 11 3/4 in) at Chicago on 18 September 1893.
- 14.75 m (48 ft 4 3/4 in) at Ottawa on 1 August 1898.
