= Floyd Smart =

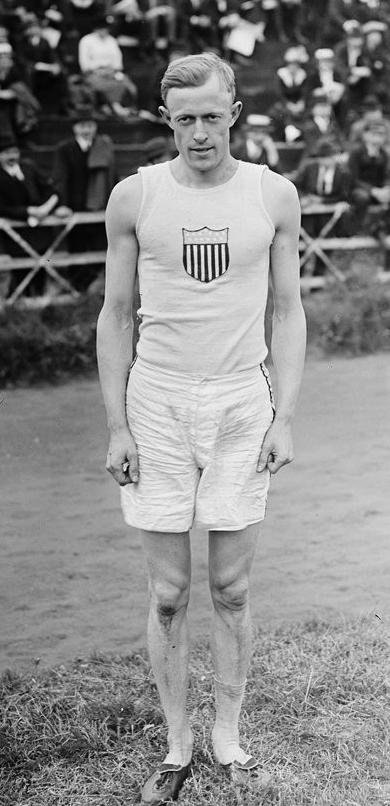
- Smart in France in 1920

Personal information
- Born: April 1, 1894
- Died: November 15, 1955 (aged 61) Glen Ellyn, Illinois, United States

Sport
- Sport: Athletics
- Event(s): Hurdles, long jump

Achievements and titles
- Personal best(s): 110 mH – 15.4 (1915); 400 mH – 54.5 (1917); LJ – 6.89 (1919)

Floyd George Smart (April 1, 1894 – November 15, 1955) was an American track and field athlete. Smart was United States champion in the 440 yd hurdles in 1917 and 1919 and in the long jump in 1919.

== Biography ==
Smart became an athlete at Lyons Township High School in La Grange, Illinois, leading the school to team titles at the 1915 interscholastic meets of both Illinois (in Class B) and Michigan. He was highly versatile, scoring points in the sprints, hurdles, high jump and long jump; in one 1917 dual meet between Northwestern University (which he then represented) and Indiana he won six individual events.

Smart won the 440 yd hurdles at the 1917 Penn Relays, overtaking world record holder Billy Meanix on the final straight, although 2 ft 6 in (76.2 cm) hurdles, rather than the usual 3 ft (91.4 cm) hurdles, were used in that race. Later that year, Smart won his first title at the national championships, defeating both Meanix and the previous year's champion, Walter Hummel; his winning time of 54.8 was only 0.2 seconds off the world record and equaled Hummel's meeting record. In 1918 Smart underwent military officer training at Camp Grant and qualified as a lieutenant; like many other top athletes, he missed that year's national championships due to World War I.

Smart returned to competition in 1919, and was favored to regain the national 440 yd hurdles title. He won the event in 55.6, ahead of Meanix; he won a second title in the long jump with a jump of 22 ft 7 1/4 in (6.88 m), overtaking his Chicago A.A. clubmate Sherman Landers in the final round.

In June 1920 Smart won the 440 yd hurdles in 55.6 at the Midwestern Tryouts, a qualifying meet for the United States Olympic Trials of that year. At the final Trials, however, he only made it past the heats as a fastest loser, and was eliminated in the semi-finals. He was named to the Olympic team, but only as an alternate, and did not get to run at the Olympics; instead, he represented the United States in meets against the national teams of Sweden and France (in Paris) and the British Empire (in London). He won the 400 m/440 yd hurdles in both of these meets.

Smart died at his home in Glen Ellyn, Illinois in November 1955. He was survived by wife, two sons and a daughter.
