= Walter Hummel (athlete) =

American track and field athlete

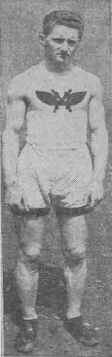
Hummel in 1916

Walter Alvoid "Walt" Hummel (June 19, 1892 – May 1978) was an American track and field athlete. He was United States champion in the 440 yd hurdles in 1916.

== Biography ==
Hummel was born in Portland, Oregon on June 19, 1892, and represented the Multnomah Athletic Club. He took up track and field as a school boy and competed in a wide variety of events, including sprints, hurdles, jumps and throws, but he never tried his eventual specialty, the 440 yd (402.3 m) hurdles, until July 1915. He had no coach, but self-developed an efficient hurdling technique resembling that of champion hurdler Robert Simpson.

Hummel was selected as captain of the Multnomah A. C.'s track and field team in 1916. That year he emerged as a serious challenger to world record holder Bill Meanix, who until then had been America's top 440 yd hurdler. At the 1916 national championships Hummel first won the junior 440 yd hurdles, running a junior meeting record of 56.4 (the junior championships were not yet limited to athletes aged under 20). The following day he also won the senior title, defeating Meanix; Meanix went out hard and led for much of the way, but Hummel caught him and won by two yards. Hummel's winning time of 54.8 was a meeting record, and only 0.2 seconds off Meanix's world record. Meanix beat him in 55.0 in a rematch the following week; Hummel had been ready to finish his season and asked for the rematch to be canceled, but was eventually persuaded to run. Despite losing the rematch Hummel was named by the AAU as the year's top 440 yd hurdler, ahead of Meanix.

United States joined World War I in 1917, and Hummel enlisted in the United States Army. Like a number of other top athletes, he obtained a leave of absence to compete in the 1917 national championships; he was one of three favorites for the 440 yd hurdles title, the others being Meanix and newcomer Floyd Smart. However, he was sick before the meet and his training had been very limited, and he placed third as Smart equaled his meeting record. During the war he was a sergeant with the 364th Field Hospital Company and assisted Simpson as a military track and field coach at Camp Lewis.

Hummel later ran a hardware store in Eugene, Oregon, with baseball player Joe "Flash" Gordon as one of his business partners.
