= Roy Pirrung =

American long-distance runner

Personal information
- Nationality: American
- Born: July 7, 1948 (age 78) Sheboygan, Wisconsin
- Occupations: Athlete, speaker and writer
- Years active: 1981–present
- Height: 5 ft 6 in (168 cm)
- Weight: 130 lb (59 kg)
- Website: www.roypirrung.com

Sport
- Country: United States
- Sport: Ultramarathon
- Club: Badgerland Striders

Roy Pirrung (born July 7, 1948) is an American ultramarathoner, middle and long-distance runner,

== Early life ==
Roy Pirrung was born in Sheboygan, Wisconsin on July 7, 1948. He graduated from Sheboygan South High School in 1966, served in the U.S. Army from 1967 to 1970 and worked at the Kohler Company from 1972 to 2007.

== Career ==
His first race was a marathon at age 32 in 1981, shortly after he kicked a two-pack-a-day cigarette habit after he noticed an obese woman run by his home.

In 1997, he was named Ultra Runner of the Year and in 2002, 2007, 2008, 2009 and 2012 he was named the masters ultra runner of the year for his stellar seasons.

Awards
Preceded by Chad Ricklefs and Mark Godale	Masters Ultrarunners of the Year (Men's winner); 2012	Succeeded by Joe Fejes
