= John L. Bredemus =

John L. Bredemus (November 20, 1884 - May 8, 1946) was a track and field athlete, teacher, principal, and golf course designer from the United States. He finished second in the 1906 Amateur Athletic Union (AAU) all-around competition, won in 1908, and lost to Olympic star Jim Thorpe in 1912, but was subsequently declared champion after Thorpe's stints playing semi-professional baseball were reported and rulings determined Thorpe ineligible for the amateur status then required at AAU and Olympic competition. He graduated from Princeton University in 1912 with a degree in civil engineering and moved to New York City where he worked as a teacher. Bredemus went on to a career designing golf courses in Texas and Mexico.

Bredemus was born in Flint, Michigan. He went to Phillips Exeter Academy.

Bredemus moved to New York City after graduating from Princeton and learned to play golf at Van Cortlandt Park. In 1919 he moved to Texas for a job as principal. Bud Shrake wrote Bredemus into his golf themed novel Billy Boy. Bredemus was inducted into the Texas Golf Hall of Fame in 1981.

He designed Memorial Park Golf Course which hosted some golf greats and was home to the Houston Open from 1951 to 1963. He is credited with designing many other courses as well.
