= 1914 USA Outdoor Track and Field Championships =

American athletics championship event

- Edition: 27th
- Dates: 12 September
- Host city: Baltimore, Maryland (men)
- Venue: Homewood Field
- Events: 16

The 1914 USA Outdoor Track and Field Championships were organized by the Amateur Athletic Union (AAU) and served as the national championships in outdoor track and field for the United States.

The meet took place on September 12th at Homewood Field in Baltimore, Maryland on the campus of Johns Hopkins University. The first women's championships were not held until 1923.

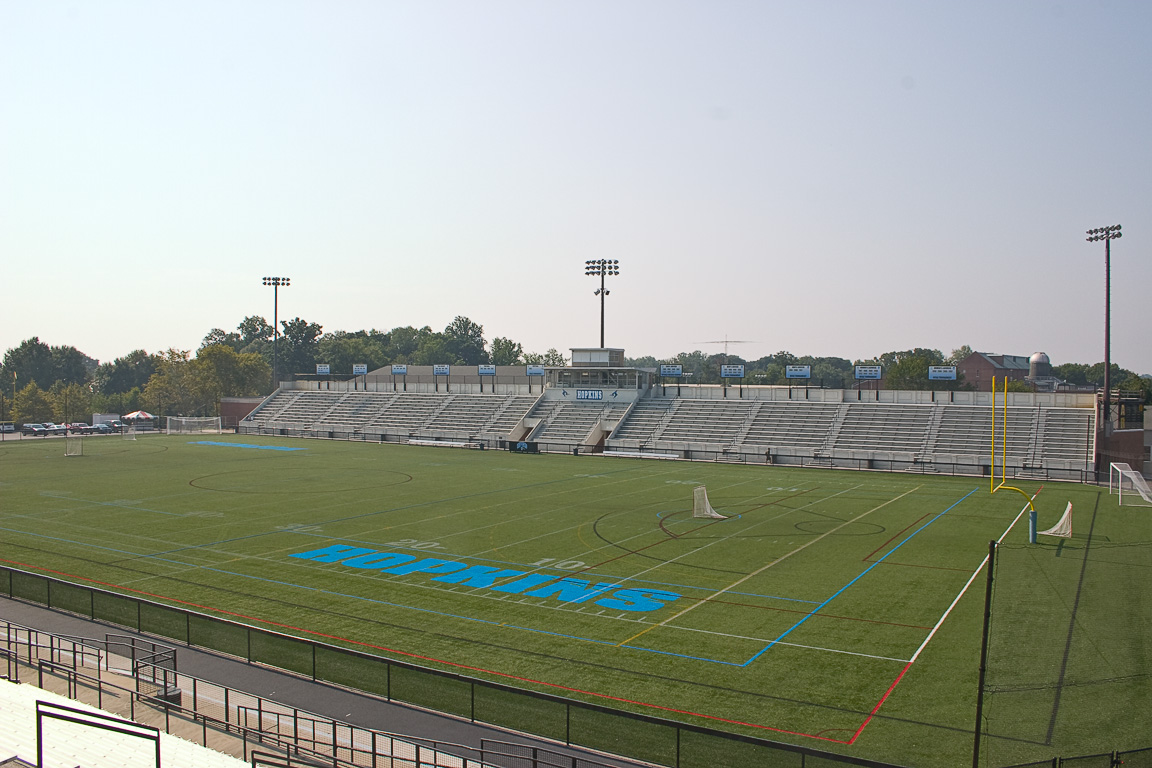
Site of the 1914 championships, Homewood Field. Currently home to Johns Hopkins men's and women's Lacrosse

Meet records were set in the discus, hammer, and 440 yard hurdles. This was the first time the 440 yard hurdles were contested at the championships. Joseph Loomis was the only triple winner, taking home gold in the 100 yard dash, 220 yards hurdles, and high jump.

== Results ==
Event	Gold		Silver		Bronze	
100 yards	Joseph Loomis	10.2	Irving Howe		Alvah Meyer	
220 yards (Note: Held on a straight track)	Irving Howe	22.2	Heaton Treadway		Alvah Meyer	
440 yards	Ted Meredith	50.2	Thomas Halpin		Valleau Wilkie	
880 yards	Homer Baker	1:57.6	W.R. Granger		E.S. Fraser	
1 mile	Abel Kiviat	4:25.2	James Powers	inches behind	Joseph Ray	
5 miles	Ville Kyrönen (FIN)	25:52.2	H.E. Weeks		Patrick Flynn	
120 yards hurdles	Harry Goelitz	16.2	Thomas McDonagh		H.E. Welch	
220 yards hurdles	Joseph Loomis	24 4/5	William Meanix		Harry Goelitz	
440 yards hurdles (Note: first time event was contested at the meet)	William Meanix	57.8 MR	Henry Schaaf		H.M. Martin	
High jump	Joseph Loomis	1.86 m	Eugene Jennings	1.84 m	Harry Grumpelt	1.79 m
Pole vault	Kenneth Curtis	3.73 m	M. Phillips	3.66 m	Marc Wright	3.50
Long jump	Platt Adams	7.06 m	Harry Worthington	7.01 m	John Paul Baker	6.84 m
Triple jump	Daniel Ahearn	14.79 m	Timothy Ahearn	14.58 m	Platt Adams	14.13 m
Shot put	Patrick McDonald	14.11 m	John Lawlor	13.47 m	Arthur Kohler	13.26 m
Discus throw	Emil Muller	44.73 m MR	Arthur Kohler	40.17	R. Albers	37.41
Hammer throw	Patrick James Ryan	58.87 m MR	Matthew McGrath		Arthur Kohler	
Javelin throw	George Bronder	50.81 m	Bruno Brodd	47.86	Brailey Gish	45.64

== See also ==
- 1914 USA Indoor Track and Field Championships
- List of USA Outdoor Track and Field Championships winners (men)
- List of USA Outdoor Track and Field Championships winners (women)
