= 1916 USA Outdoor Track and Field Championships =

American athletics championship event

- Dates: 9 September (men)
- Host city: Newark, New Jersey (men)
- Venue: Weequahic Park (men)
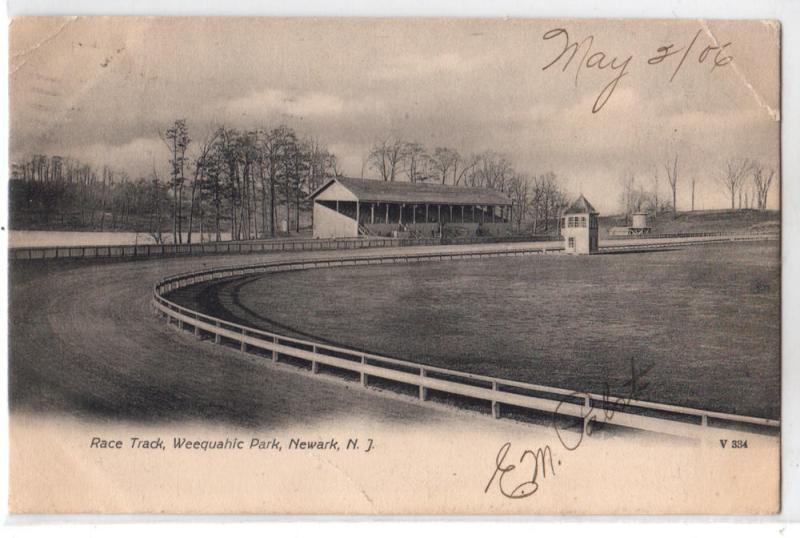

The 1916 USA Outdoor Track and Field Championships were organized by the Amateur Athletic Union (AAU) and served as the national championships in outdoor track and field for the United States.

The men's edition was held at Weequahic Park in Newark, New Jersey, and it took place 9 September. The first women's championships were not held until 1923.

At the championships, Robert Simpson broke the world record in the 120 yards hurdles.

== Results ==
Event	Gold		Silver		Bronze	
100 yards	Andrew Ward	10.0	Alvah Meyer		Joseph Loomis	
220 yards straight	Andrew Ward	21.6S	Roy Morse		Andrew Kelly	
440 yards	Thomas Halpin	49.8	Ted Meredith	2 feet behind	Alfred Booth	10 yards behind 2nd
880 yards	Donald Scott	1:54.0	Larry Scudder	5 yards behind	John Overton	
1 mile	Ivan Meyers	4:22.0	James Powers	20 yards behind	Paul Clyde	few feet behind 2nd
5 miles	Joseph Ray	26:11.6	Ville Kyrönen (FIN)		H. E. Weeks	
120 yards hurdles	Robert Simpson	14.8	Frederick Kelly	2 yards behind	Earl Thomson (CAN)	
440 yards hurdles	Walter Hummel	54.8	William Meanix		C. A. Hoenisch	
2 miles steeplechase	Michael Devaney	10:48.4	John Overton	75 yards behind	William Kennedy	
High jump	Wesley Oler	1.88 m	Harry Barwise	1.88 m	Egon Erickson	1.85 m
Pole vault	Sherman Landers	3.88 m	Edward Knourek	3.81 m	Florin Floyd	3.81 m
Long jump	Harry Worthington	7.07 m	William Sisson	6.74 m	Platt Adams	6.66 m
Triple jump	Daniel Ahearn	14.03 m	Timothy Ahearne	13.99 m	Sherman Landers	13.73 m
Shot put	Arlie Mucks	14.38 m	Alma Richards	13.38 m	John Lawlor	13.09 m
Discus throw	Arlie Mucks	44.31 m	Emil Muller	43.22 m	James Duncan	41.15 m
Hammer throw	Patrick James Ryan	53.24 m	Matthew McGrath	48.66 m	O. R. Benson	44.04 m
Javelin throw	George Bronder	58.06 m	James Lincoln	57.84 m	Robert Nourse	52.63 m
220 yards hurdles	Feg Murray	24.0				
Weight throw for distance	Matt McGrath	10.80 m				
All-around decathlon	Avery Brundage	6468.75 pts				

== See also ==
- 1916 USA Indoor Track and Field Championships
- List of USA Outdoor Track and Field Championships winners (men)
- List of USA Outdoor Track and Field Championships winners (women)
