= John Hooker =

John Hooker may refer to:

- John Hooker (English constitutionalist) (c. 1527–1601), English writer, solicitor, antiquary, civic administrator and advocate of republican government
- John Lee Hooker (1912–2001), American blues singer-songwriter and guitarist
- John Lee Hooker Jr. (born 1952), American blues musician
- John Daggett Hooker (1838–1911), social leader, amateur scientist and astronomer, donor of the Hooker Telescope
- John Hooker (abolitionist) (1816–1901), lawyer, judge, abolitionist, and reformer for women's rights
- John Hooker (novelist) (1932–2008), Australian novelist
- John Jay Hooker (1930–2016), American attorney, entrepreneur, political gadfly and perennial candidate
- John Michael Hooker (1953–2003), American murderer executed in Oklahoma
- John Hooker (hammer thrower) (born 1887), American hammer thrower, 2nd at the 1918 USA Outdoor Track and Field Championships
- John Hooker (pole vaulter) (born 1915), American pole vaulter, 1936 All-American for the USC Trojans track and field team
