= Brundageplatz =

Public square in Munich, Germany

Coordinates: 48°10′43″N 11°33′19″E

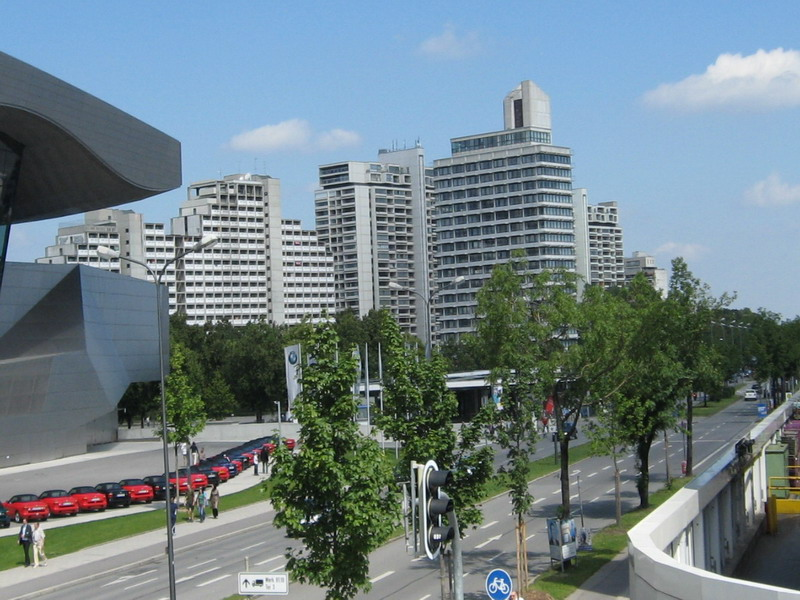
View from Lerchenauerstraße to the Brundageplatz

The Brundageplatz is a square in the Munich Olympia Park in Milbertshofen-Am Hart (Am Riesenfeld).

== Description ==
Its surroundings include the BMW Welt in the south, the Studentenviertel Oberwiesenfeld (student quarter) and the Olympia Tower in the north-west, the Olympic Village and a Skatepark in the west, as well as the former bus station and the underground station Olympiazentrum on Lerchenauer Straße.

It is planned to extend the Olympic Park at this (previously asphalted) location into a "green" entrance of 6,000 square meters.

== History ==
Today, it is under historical monument protection under the file number E-1-62-000-70. It was named in 1975 after Avery Brundage (President of the IOC from 1952 to 1972).
