= Jay Xu =

Chinese-born American museum director (b. 1963)

- 许杰
- Born: 1963 (age 62–63); Shanghai, China
- Education: Shanghai University, Princeton University
- Occupations: Art museum director, art historian, curator

Jay Xu (Chinese: 许杰; born 1963) is a Chinese-born American museum director, art historian, and curator. He was the first Chinese-American curator of a major museum in the United States, serving as director and CEO of the Asian Art Museum of San Francisco from 2008 to 2025.

== Early life ==
Jay Xu was born in 1963 in Shanghai, China. He attended Shanghai University. Xu worked as an assistant to the museum director Ma Chengyuan at the Shanghai Museum. Later, due to work reasons, he came into contact with Robert Bagley, a professor at Princeton University who came to Shanghai for academic exchanges.

== Career ==
Xu moved to the United States in 1990, pursuing a M.A. degree and PhD program at Princeton University. After graduation, he worked as a research fellow at the Metropolitan Museum of Art, from 1995 until 1996. Xu worked as the curator of Chinese art at the Seattle Art Museum from 1996 to 2003; and as the head of the Asian art department and chairman of the Department of Asian and Ancient Art at the Art Institute of Chicago from 2003 to 2006.

Since June 2008, Xu has served as the director and CEO of the Asian Art Museum of San Francisco, succeeding Emily Sano. Under his leadership, the Asian Art Museum avoided a financial crisis, growing its collection with more than 2,200 new art acquisitions and hosting at least 100 exhibitions. In 2017, Xu led a fundraising campaign to fund the museum's building renovation and expansion. In 2020, during the Black Lives Matter protests, the museum removed the bust of Avery Brundage, someone accused of being a Nazi sympathizer and a racist. During this time, the museum also decided to critically examine the provenance of the artwork in the collection.

In April 2023, Xu announced plans to step down from the Asian Art Museum in 2025, with Soyoung Lee officially replacing him as director and CEO in January 2025.
