= 1968 riots =

1968 riots may refer to:

- Protests of 1968, worldwide escalation of social conflicts
- Orangeburg Massacre, February 8, South Carolina State University, Orangeburg, South Carolina
- King assassination riots, April and May, across the United States, including:
  - 1968 Washington, D.C., riots, April 4–8, Washington, D.C.
  - 1968 Chicago riots (West Side Riots), April 5–7, Chicago, Illinois
  - Baltimore riot of 1968, April 6–12, Baltimore, Maryland
  - 1968 riots in Avondale, Cincinnati, April 8, Cincinnati, Ohio
  - 1968 Kansas City, Missouri, riot, April 9, Kansas City, Missouri
  - Wilmington riot of 1968, April 9–10, Wilmington, Delaware
  - 1968 Louisville riots, May 27–29, Louisville, Kentucky
- May 68, civil unrest and student riots in France
- Glenville shootout, July 23–28, Cleveland, Ohio
- 1968 riots in Gary, Indiana, July 1968
- 1968 Democratic National Convention protests, August 1968, Chicago, Illinois
- 1968 Mauritian riots, 22 January 1968, across Mauritius
