= Harry Goelitz =

American decathlete (1894–1971)

Personal information
- Full name: Harry George Goelitz
- Born: January 9, 1894 Oak Park, Illinois, United States
- Died: May 14, 1971 (aged 77) Oak Park, Illinois, United States
- Height: 5 ft 11 in (180 cm)
- Spouse: Mary Frierson Evans
- Children: 4

Sport
- Sport: Athletics
- Event: Decathlon

Harry George Goelitz (January 9, 1894 – May 14, 1971) was an American athlete. He competed in the men's decathlon at the 1920 Summer Olympics.

Goelitz was trained at Oak Park and River Forest High School by Bob Zuppke, and at Mercersburg Academy by Jimmy Curran. In late 1913, he was thrown out of Mercersburg for leaving the grounds without permission. He transferred to Keewatin Academy in Wisconsin.

In 1921, Goelitz's leg was crushed between a cement mixer and a road roller. He was rushed to the hospital and recovered, but it is likely this accident ended his athletics career.
