= 1918 USA Outdoor Track and Field Championships =

American athletics championship event

- Dates: 21 September (men)
- Host city: Great Lakes, Illinois (men)
- Venue: Great Lakes Naval Station (men)
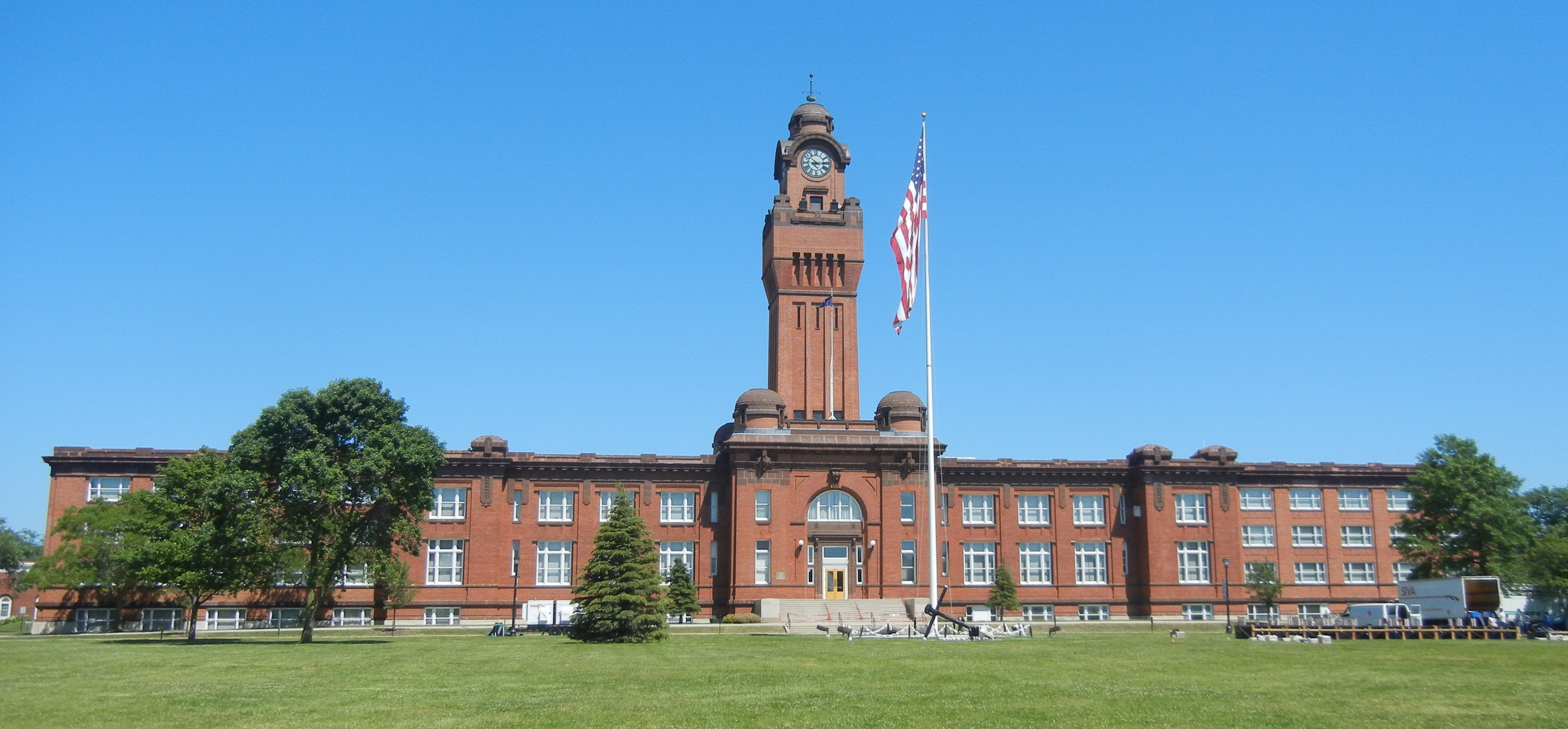

The 1918 USA Outdoor Track and Field Championships were organized by the Amateur Athletic Union (AAU) and served as the national championships in outdoor track and field for the United States.

The men's edition was held at Great Lakes Naval Station in Great Lakes, Illinois, and it took place 21 September. The first women's championships were not held until 1923.

At the championships, there were a record 400 competitors, but most of them had already enlisted in World War I and many did not continue competing after the war.

== Results ==
Event	Gold		Silver		Bronze	
100 yards	Arthur Henke	10.0	Joseph Loomis		Thomas Hoskins	
220 yards straight	Loren Murchison	22.4S	Peter White		Frank Feuerstein	
440 yards	Cornelius Shaughnessy	49.4	Marvin Gustafson	3 yards behind	Donald Hauser	1 foot behind 2nd
880 yards	Thomas Campbell	1:56.8	Joseph Ray	5 yards behind	E. Balestier (CAN)	
1 mile	Joseph Ray	4:20.0	William Gordon		Clyde Stout	
5 miles	Charles Pores	24:36.8	Earl Johnson		Frank Gillespie	
120 yards hurdles	Earl Thomson (CAN)	15.2	Frank Loomis		Walker Smith	
440 yards hurdles	Donald Hauser	59.0	F. J. Sauer		C. D. Sutphen	
High jump	Carl Rice	1.85 m	Joseph Loomis	1.80 m	Earl Thomson (CAN)	1.65 m
Pole vault	Carl Buck	3.73 m	Edward Knourek	3.68 m	C. Bean	3.60 m
Long jump	David Politzer	6.81 m	Daniel Ahearn	6.66 m	E. A. Anderson	6.50 m
Triple jump	Daniel Ahearn	14.11 m	William B. Overbee	13.33 m	Sherman Landers	13.26 m
Shot put	Alma Richards	12.90 m	Avery Brundage	12.60 m	George Bronder	12.38 m
Discus throw	Emil Muller	41.45 m	Earl Gilfillian	40.28 m	Alma Richards	39.52 m
Hammer throw	Matthew McGrath	53.01 m	John Hooker	41.51 m	Avery Brundage	40.38 m
Javelin throw	George Bronder	51.78 m	Racine Thompson	51.46 m	J. B. Fritts	45.36 m
220 yards hurdles	Frank Loomis	24.2				
Weight throw for distance	Matt McGrath	10.59 m				
All-around decathlon	Avery Brundage	6708.5 pts				

== See also ==
- 1918 USA Indoor Track and Field Championships
- List of USA Outdoor Track and Field Championships winners (men)
- List of USA Outdoor Track and Field Championships winners (women)
