= Giulio Onesti =

Italian sporting director (1912–1981)

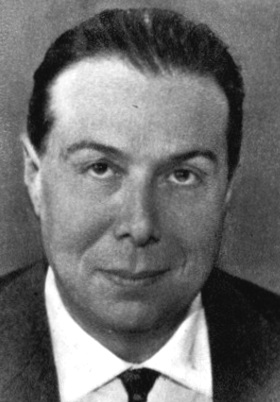
- Born: January 4, 1912; Turin
- Died: 11 December 1981 (aged 69); Rome
- Occupations: lawyer, sports manager

Giulio Onesti (4 January 1912 - 11 December 1981) was an Italian lawyer and sports manager, that was leader of the Italian National Olympic Committee from 1944 to 1946 as special commissioner, then from 1946 to 1978 as president.
