= Bill Meanix =

American hurdler

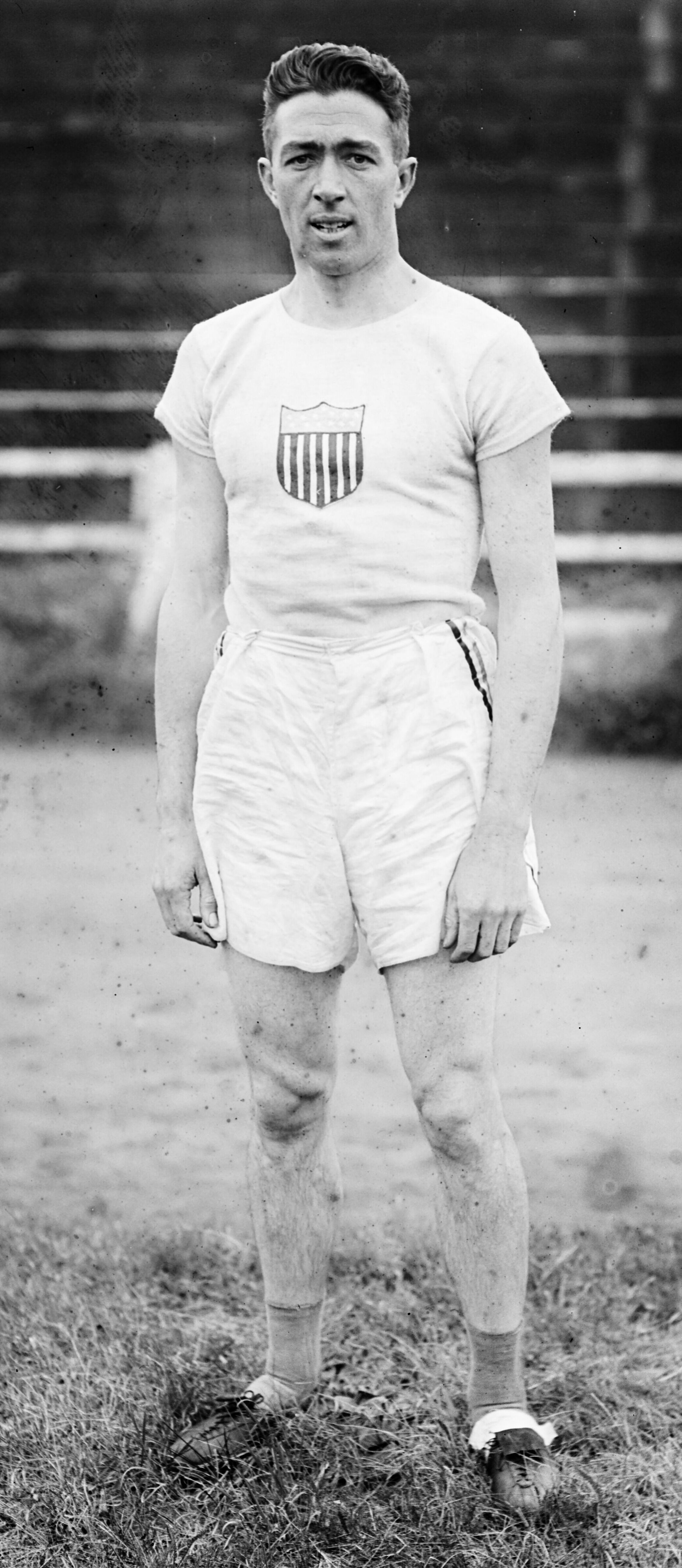
- Meanix in 1920

Personal information
- Born: January 18, 1892
- Died: October 13, 1957 (aged 65)

Sport
- Sport: Athletics
- Event: Hurdles
- Club: Boston Athletic Association

Achievements and titles
- Personal bests: 110 mH – 16.0 (1914); 400 mH – 54.3 (1915)

William Henry Meanix (January 18, 1892 – October 13, 1957) was an American track and field athlete. He held the world record in the 440 yd hurdles from 1915 to 1920, and he won the event the first two times it was contested at the United States championships.

== Early life and education ==
Meanix became a track athlete at The English High School in Boston, Massachusetts. He subsequently studied at Colby College and Harvard University.

== Track career ==
At first, Meanix did not specialize in any one event, but competed in the sprints, hurdles and the shot put.

Representing the Boston A. A., Meanix won the 440 yd (402 m) hurdles at the 1914 United States championships, becoming the inaugural champion; while the championships had been held since 1876, this was the first time the 440 yd hurdles had been contested. His winning time of 57.8 seconds was a new American record, although Charles Bacon had run the slightly shorter 400 m hurdles in 55.0, equivalent to 55.3–55.4 for the imperial distance; the world record for the imperial hurdles was 56.8, held by Britain's G. R. L. Anderson.

On July 16, 1915, Meanix ran the 440 yd hurdles in 54.6 at Cambridge, Massachusetts, improving Anderson's world record by more than two seconds and also breaking Bacon's time. He set his record in the same meet where Norman Taber surpassed Walter George's mile world record from 1886. This time would remain Meanix's best, and stood as a world record until John Norton ran 54.2 in 1920. (Note: Meanix's world record of 54.6 was never officially ratified by the International Amateur Athletic Federation (IAAF), which was based in Europe and unable to act during World War I. By the time the IAAF started ratifying records again in 1921, Meanix's record had been superseded by Norton's. Meanix's time was, however, statistically valid and considered the de facto world record until Norton broke it, and the American AAU recommended it for official approval.) Meanix won the 1915 national championship in an even faster time, 52.6, but that race was held on a straight track and was wind-aided, making the time statistically invalid. His most serious rival in that race was August Muenter, who had earlier run 53.6 in similar conditions, but he fell at the ninth hurdle while trailing Meanix.

In 1916 Meanix was challenged as the leading American by Walter Hummel, who defeated him by two yards at the national championships in the meeting record time of 54.8. The following week Meanix beat him in a rematch, running 55.0, but Hummel was still selected for the AAU's top All-American team of the year. At the 1917 Penn Relays Meanix was defeated by another newcomer, Floyd Smart, in 55.2; The Harvard Crimson felt the use of 2 ft 6 in (76.2 cm) hurdles, instead of the usual 3 ft (91 cm) hurdles, had favored Smart, but he beat Meanix again at the national championships, where regular hurdles were used. Meanix took second, ahead of Hummel.

When the United States entere World War I, Meanix enlisted in the United States Army in November 1917. He was discharged as a 1st Lieutenant in May 1919 and resumed hurdling, taking second behind Smart at the 1919 national championships.

Meanix competed in the 1920 United States Olympic Trials, but was eliminated in the semi-finals and failed to qualify for the Olympic team; instead, he (and Smart, who had also failed to qualify) represented the United States in post-Olympic meets against teams from France, Sweden and the British Empire.

In 1923 Meanix was appointed as Tufts College's track and field coach. He later returned to his former high school, the English High School, and had a long career there as a military drill instructor. During World War II Meanix returned to active Army service, now with the rank of major, and commanded an Army Specialized Training Unit at Northwestern University.

He retired from the Army in 1946 as a lieutenant colonel.

== Legacy ==
Meanix was inducted in the English High School's Hall of Fame in 1987.

== Notes ==
Records
Preceded by (United Kingdom) G. R. L. Anderson	Men's 440 yd Hurdles World Record Holder; July 16, 1915 – June 26, 1920	Succeeded by (United States) John Norton
