= Harry Worthington =

American long jumper

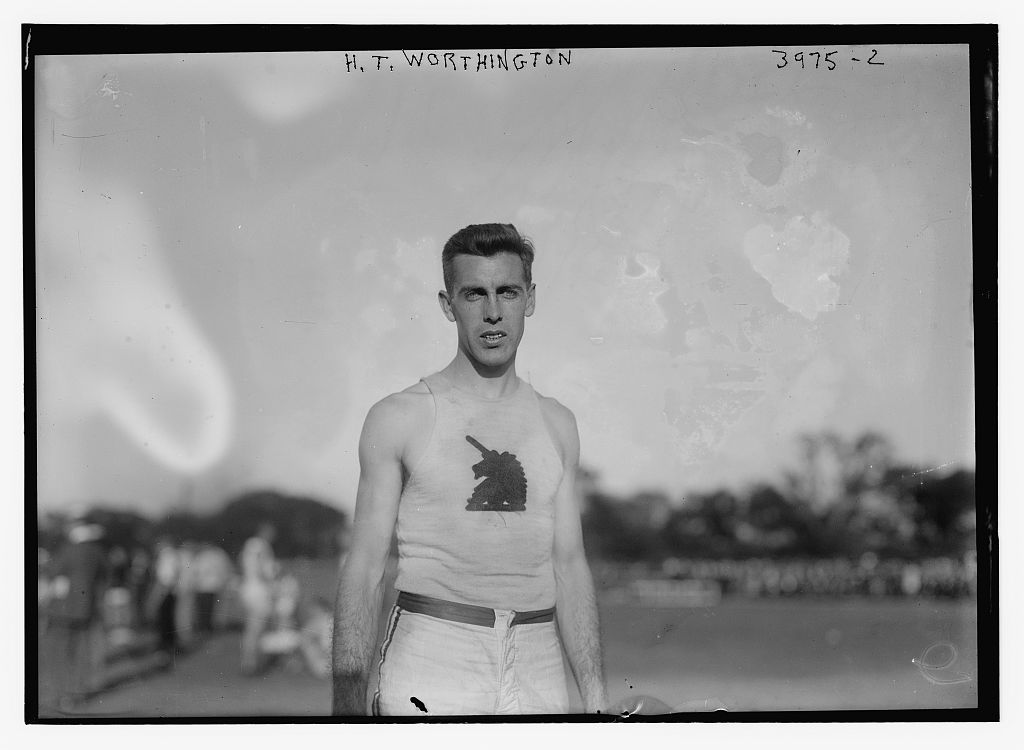
Worthington in 1916

Harry Thomas Worthington (December 28, 1891 – March 4, 1990) was an American track and field athlete who competed in the 1912 Summer Olympics.

== Biography ==
In 1912, he finished fourth in the long jump competition. He was the AAU and IC4A long jump champion in 1915–16.

He died in Flushing, New York on March 4, 1990.
