= USA Marathon Championships =

Annual national championships for marathon

- Location: United States
- Event type: Road
- Distance: Marathon
- Established: Men's race 1925; Women's race 1974

The USA Marathon Championships is the annual national championships for marathon running in the United States. The race serves as a way of designating the American national champion for the marathon. The men's race was first contested in 1925 and a women's race was added to the program in 1974.

Since 1968, in years which the Summer Olympics are held the event serves as a way of selecting the athletes who will represent the United States at the Olympic Games, with the top three eligible finishers selected to be on the Olympic team and the fourth and fifth eligible finishers being designated as alternates. During these years, the race is more commonly referred to as the United States Olympic trials and it is much more competitive.

== Men's results ==
Year	Location	Venue	American winner (Note: In 2007, 2010, and 2015, a runner that was not an American citizen won the race so the title of U.S. marathon champion went to the top American finisher.)	Time
2025	Sacramento, California	California International Marathon	Futsum Zienasellassie	2:09:29
2024	Orlando, FL	US Olympic trials	Conner Mantz	2:09:05
2022	Sacramento, California	California International Marathon	Futsum Zienasellassie	2:11:01
2021	—	—	—	—
2020	Atlanta, GA	US Olympic trials	Galen Rupp (2)	2:09:20
2019	—	—	—	—
2018	Sacramento, California	California International Marathon	Brogan Austin	2:12:38
2017	Sacramento, California	California International Marathon	Tim Ritchie	2:11:56
2016	Los Angeles, California	US Olympic trials	Galen Rupp	2:11:12
2015	Los Angeles, California	Los Angeles Marathon	Jared Ward	2:12:56
2014	Minneapolis-Saint Paul, Minnesota	Medtronic Twin Cities Marathon	Tyler Pennel	2:13:32
2013	Minneapolis-Saint Paul, Minnesota	Medtronic Twin Cities Marathon	Nicholas Arciniaga	2:13:11
2012	Houston, Texas	US Olympic trials	Meb Keflezighi (2)	2:09:08
2011	—	—	—	—
2010	Minneapolis-Saint Paul, Minnesota	Medtronic Twin Cities Marathon	Sergio Reyes	2:14:02
2009	New York, New York	ING New York City Marathon	Meb Keflezighi	2:09:15
2008	Minneapolis-Saint Paul, Minnesota	Twin Cities Marathon	Fernando Cabada	2:16:31
2007	New York, New York	US Olympic trials	Ryan Hall	2:09:02
2006	Minneapolis-Saint Paul, Minnesota	Twin Cities Marathon	Mbarak Hussein (2)	2:13:52
2005	Minneapolis-Saint Paul, Minnesota	Twin Cities Marathon	Mbarak Hussein	2:18:28
2004	Birmingham, Alabama	US Olympic trials	Alan Culpepper	2:11:42
2003	Birmingham, Alabama	Mercedes-Benz Marathon	Ryan Shay	2:14:29
2002	Minneapolis-Saint Paul, Minnesota	Twin Cities Marathon	Dan Browne	2:11:35
2001	New York, New York	New York City Marathon	Scott Larson	2:15:26
2000	Pittsburgh, Pennsylvania	US Olympic trials	Rod DeHaven	2:15:30
1999	Pittsburgh, Pennsylvania	Pittsburgh Marathon	Alfredo Vigueras	2:14:20
1998	Pittsburgh, Pennsylvania	Pittsburgh Marathon	Keith Brantly (2)	2:12:31
1997	Pittsburgh, Pennsylvania	Pittsburgh Marathon	Dave Scudamore	2:13:48
1996	Charlotte, North Carolina	US Olympic trials	Bob Kempainen	2:12:45
1995	Charlotte, North Carolina	USA NationsBank Marathon	Keith Brantly	2:14:27
1994	Los Angeles, California	Los Angeles Marathon	Paul Pilkington	2:12:13
1993	Minneapolis-Saint Paul, Minnesota	Twin Cities Marathon	Ed Eyestone	2:14:34
1992	Columbus, Ohio	US Olympic trials	Steve Spence (2)	2:12:43
1991	Columbus, Ohio	Columbus Marathon	Bill Reifsnyder (2)	2:12:39
1990	Columbus, Ohio	Columbus Marathon	Steve Spence	2:12:17
1989	Jersey City, New Jersey	New Jersey Waterfront Marathon	Bill Reifsnyer	2:12:09
1988	Jersey City, New Jersey	US Olympic trials	Mark Conover	2:12:26
1987	Houston, Texas	Houston Marathon	Ric Sayre	2:13:54
1986	Minneapolis-Saint Paul, Minnesota	Twin Cities Marathon	Bill Donakowski	2:10:41
1985	Pittsburgh, Pennsylvania	Pittsburgh Marathon	Ken Martin (2)	2:12:57
1984	Sacramento, California	California International Marathon	Ken Martin	2:11:24
1983	San Francisco, California	San Francisco Marathon	Peter Pfitzinger	2:14:45
1982	Syracuse, New York	—	Joel Menges	2:32:39
1981	Raleigh, North Carolina	—	Robert Johnson	2:29:14
1980	Cupertino, California	Paul Masson Marathon	Frank Richardson	2:13:54
1979	Houston, Texas	Houston Maraton	Tom Antczak	2:15:28
1978	Niagara Falls, New York	Skylon International Marathon	Carl Harfield	2:17:21
1977	Culver City, California	Western Hemisphere Marathon	Edward Schelegle	2:18:11
1976	Crowley, Louisiana	—	Gary Tuttle (2)	2:15:15
1975	Culver City, California	Western Hemisphere Marathon	Gary Tuttle	2:17:21
1974	Yonkers, New York	Yonkers Marathon	Ronald Wayne	2:18:53
1973	Burlingame, California	—	Douglas Schmenk	2:15:48
1972	Liverpool, New York	—	Edmund Norris	2:24:43
1971	Eugene, Oregon	—	Kenny Moore	2:16:49
1970	Redfield, Iowa	—	Robert Fitts	2:24:11
1969	Culver City, California	Western Hemisphere Marathon	Tom Heinonen	2:24:43
1968	Alamosa, Colorado	US Olympic trials	George Young	2:30:48
1967	Holyoke, Massachusetts	—	Ron Daws	2:40:07
1966	Yonkers, New York	Yonkers Marathon	Norm Higgins	2:22:51
1965	Yonkers, New York	Yonkers Marathon	Garnett Williams	2:33:51
1964	Yonkers, New York	Yonkers Marathon	Buddy Edelen	2:24:26
1963	Yonkers, New York	Yonkers Marathon	John J. Kelley (8)	2:25:18
1962	Yonkers, New York	Yonkers Marathon	John J. Kelley (7)	2:27:40
1961	Yonkers, New York	Yonkers Marathon	John J. Kelley (6)	2:26:54
1960	Yonkers, New York	Yonkers Marathon	John J. Kelley (5)	2:20:14
1959	Yonkers, New York	Yonkers Marathon	John J. Kelley (4)	2:21:55
1958	Yonkers, New York	Yonkers Marathon	John J. Kelley (3)	2:21:01
1957	Yonkers, New York	Yonkers Marathon	John J. Kelley (2)	2:24:56
1956	Yonkers, New York	Yonkers Marathon	John J. Kelley	2:24:53
1955	Yonkers, New York	Yonkers Marathon	Nicholas Costes	2:31:13
1954	Yonkers, New York	Yonkers Marathon	Ted Corbitt	2:46:14
1953	Yonkers, New York	Yonkers Marathon	John Lafferty	2:50:31
1952	Yonkers, New York	Yonkers Marathon	Victor Dyrgall (2)	2:38:39
1951	Yonkers, New York	Yonkers Marathon	Jesse Van Zant	2:37:12
1950	Yonkers, New York	Yonkers Marathon	John A. Kelley (3)	2:45:56
1949	Yonkers, New York	Yonkers Marathon	Victor Dyrgall	2:38:50
1948	Queens, New York	Idlewild Marathon	John A. Kelley (2)	2:48:33
1947	Yonkers, New York	Yonkers Marathon	Ted Vogel	2:40:11
1946	Yonkers, New York	Yonkers Marathon	John A. Kelley	2:50:29
1945	Yonkers, New York	Yonkers Marathon	Charles Robbins, Jr. (2)	2:37:14
1944	Yonkers, New York	Yonkers Marathon	Charles Robbins, Jr.	2:40:49
1943	Yonkers, New York	Yonkers Marathon	Frederick McGlone (2)	2:39:09
1942	Yonkers, New York	Yonkers Marathon	Frederick McGlone	2:37:54
1941	Yonkers, New York	Yonkers Marathon	Bernard Smith	2:36:07
1940	Yonkers, New York	Yonkers Marathon	Lou Gregory	2:35:10
1939	Yonkers, New York	Yonkers Marathon	Pat Dengis (3)	2:33:46
1938	Yonkers, New York	Yonkers Marathon	Pat Dengis (2)	2:39:39
1937	Washington, D.C.	—	Melvin Porter (3)	2:44:22
1936	Washington, D.C.	—	William McMahon	2:38:15
1935	Washington, D.C.	—	Pat Dengis	2:53:46
1934	Washington, D.C.	—	Melvin Porter (2)	2:48:04
1933	Washington, D.C.	—	Melvin Porter	2:53:46
1932	Washington, D.C.	—	Clyde Martak	2:58:18
1931	Baltimore, Maryland	—	William Agee	2:32:38
1930	Staten Island, New York	—	Karl Koski	2:25:22
1929	Boston, Massachusetts	Boston, Marathon	Clarence DeMar (4)	2:43:47
1928	Boston, Massachusetts	Boston Marathon	Clarence DeMar (3)	2:37:08
1927	Baltimore, Maryland	—	Clarence DeMar (2)	2:40:23
1926	Baltimore, Maryland	—	Clarence DeMar	2:45:06
1925	Boston, Massachusetts	Boston Marathon	Charles Mellor	2:33:01

=== Multiple winners ===
Multiple winners of the men's USA Marathon Championships
Runner	Total	Years
John J. Kelley	8	1956, 1957, 1958,1959, 1960, 1961, 1962, 1963
Clarence DeMar	4	1926, 1927, 1928, 1929
Melvin Porter	3	1933, 1934, 1937
Pat Dengis	3	1935, 1938, 1939
John A. Kelley	3	1946, 1948, 1950
Frederick McGlone	2	1942, 1943
Charles Robbins, Jr.	2	1944, 1945
Victor Dyrgall	2	1949, 1952
Gary Tuttle	2	1975, 1976
Ken Martin	2	1984, 1985
Bill Reifsnyder	2	1989, 1991
Steve Spence	2	1990, 1992
Keith Brantly	2	1995, 1998
Mbarak Hussein	2	2005, 2006
Meb Keflezighi	2	2009, 2012
Galen Rupp	2	2016, 2020
Futsum Zienasellassie	2	2022, 2025

== Women's results ==
Year	Location	Venue	American winner	Time
2025	Sacramento, California	California International Marathon	Molly Born	2:24:09
2024	Orlando, FL	US Olympic trials	Fiona O'Keeffe	2:22:10
2022	Sacramento, California	California International Marathon	Paige Stoner	2:26:02
2021	—	—	—	—
2020	Atlanta, Georgia	US Olympic trials	Aliphine Tuliamuk	2:27:23
2019	—	—	—	—
2018	Sacramento, California	California International Marathon	Emma Bates	2:28:18
2017	Sacramento, California	California International Marathon	Sara Hall	2:28:10
2016	Los Angeles, California	US Olympic trials	Amy Cragg	2:28:20
2015	Los Angeles, California	Los Angeles Marathon	Blake Russell	2:34:57
2014	Minneapolis-Saint Paul, Minnesota	Medtronic Twin Cities Marathon	Esther Erb	2:34:01
2013	Minneapolis-Saint Paul, Minnesota	Medtronic Twin Cities Marathon	Annie Bersagel	2:30:53
2012	Houston, Texas	US Olympic trials	Shalane Flanagan	2:28:38
2011	—	—	—	—
2010	New York City, New York	ING New York City Marathon	Shalane Flanagan	2:28:40
2009	Minneapolis-Saint Paul, Minnesota	Medtronic Twin Cities Marathon	Ilsa Paulson	2:31:49
2008	Boston, Massachusetts	US Olympic trials	Deena Kastor (3)	2:28:35
2007	Boston, Massachusetts	Boston Marathon	Deena Kastor	2:35:09
2006	Minneapolis-Saint Paul, Minnesota	Twin Cities Marathon	Marla Runyan	2:32:17
2005	Minneapolis-Saint Paul, Minnesota	Twin Cities Marathon	Nicole Aish	2:40:21
2004	St. Louis, Missouri	US Olympic trials	Colleen De Reuck	2:28:25
2003	St. Louis Missouri	Michelob Ultra USA Championship	Sara Wells	2:35:37
2002	Minneapolis-Saint Paul, Minnesota	Twin Cities Marathon	Jill Gaitenby	2:36:10
2001	New York City, New York	New York City Marathon	Deena Drossin	2:26:58
2000	Columbia, South Carolina	US Olympic trials	Christine Clark	2:33:31
1999	Minneapolis-Saint Paul, Minnesota	Twin Cities Marathon	Kim Pawelek	2:37:57
1998	Houston, Texas	Methodist Healthcare Houston Marathon	Gwyn Coogan	2:33:37
1997	Columbia, South Carolina	Columbia Marathon	Julia Kirtland	2:27:46
1996	Columbia, South Carolina	US Olympic trials	Jenny Spangler	2:29:54
1995	Columbia, South Carolina	USA Championships	Debbi Kilpatrick-Morris	2:34:42
1994	Duluth, Minnesota	Grandma's Marathon	Linda Somers (2)	2:33:42
1993	Sacramento, California	California International Marathon	Linda Somers	2:34:11
1992	Houston, Texas	US Olympic trials	Janis Klecker (2)	2:30:12
1991	Long Beach, California	Long Beach Marathon	Maria Trujillo	2:35:39
1990	Duluth, Minnesota	Grandma's Marathon	Jane Welzel	2:33:35
1989	Sacramento, California	California International Marathon	Nan Doak-Davis	2:33:11
1988	Pittsburgh, Pennsylvania	US Olympic trials	Margaret Groos	2:29:50
1987	Duluth, Minnesota	Grandma's Marathon	Janis Klecker	2:36:12
1986	Minneapolis-Saint Paul, Minnesota	Twin Cities Marathon	Kim Rosenquist	2:32:31
1985	Sacramento, California	California International Marathon	Nancy Ditz	2:31:36
1984	Sacramento, California	California International Marathon	Katy Schilly	2:32:40
1983	Los Angeles, California	Avon International Marathon	Julie Brown (2)	2:26:26
1982	San Francisco, California	Avon International Marathon	Laurie Binder	2:39:46
1981	Ottawa, Canada	Avon International Marathon	Nancy Conz	2:36:46
1980	Cupertino, California	Paul Masson Marathon	Susan Munday	2:43:17
1979	Houston, Texas	Houston Marathon	Susan Petersen	2:46:17
1978	New York City, New York	New York City Marathon	Marty Cooksey	2:41:49
1977	Minneapolis, Minnesota	City of Lakes Marathon	Leal-Ann Reinhart	2:46:34
1976	Culver City, California	Western Hemisphere Marathon	Julie Brown	2:45:33
1975	New York City, New York	New York City Marathon	Kim Merritt	2:46:15
1974	San Mateo, California	West Valley Marathon	Judy Shapiro-Ikenberry	2:55:18

=== Multiple winners ===
Multiple winners of the women's USA Marathon Championships
Runner	Total	Years
Deena Kastor	3	2001, 2007, 2008
Julie Brown	2	1976, 1983
Janis Klecker	2	1987,1992
Linda Somers	2	1993, 1994
Shalane Flanagan	2	2010, 2012

== Records ==
Men's USA Marathon Championships event record
Year	Location	Venue	Runner	Time
2007	New York, New York	US Olympic trials	Ryan Hall	2:09:02

Women's USA Marathon Championships event record
Year	Location	Venue	Runner	Time
2024	Orlando, Florida	US Olympic Trials	Fiona O'Keeffe	2:22:10

== See also ==
- USA Half Marathon Championships
- USA Cross Country Championships
- USA Indoor Track and Field Championships
- USA Outdoor Track and Field Championships
