= James Clark (athlete) =

American long-distance runner

James A. Clark (?? – ??) was an American long-distance runner who is recognized as having set a world's best in the marathon on February 12, 1909 with a time of 2:46:52 at the Brooklyn Marathon. (Note: According to the progression of world bests listed by the International Association of Athletics Federations (IAAF), James Clark set a world best of 2:46:52.8 in New York on February 12, 1909, Albert Raines broke Clark's mark with a 2:46:04.6 in New York on May 8, 1909, and Henry Barrett broke Raines' mark with a 2:42:31.0 in London on May 26, 1909. Ian Ridpath, a former director of the Polytechnic marathon, has indicated on his website that some sources have wrongly listed the date of Barrett performance as May 26, 1909 and has confirmed the true date as May 8, 1909. An article in The Times dated May 10, 1909 provides strong evidence that Ridpath is correct. Given that Barrett's marathon in London most likely concluded before Raines' marathon held on the same date in New York, it is also likely that Barrett rather than Raines broke the world best set by Clark three months earlier.) (Note: Spalding's Official Athletic Almanac for 1910 indicates that name of the marathon both as the "Thirteenth Regiment A.A. Marathon" and also as the "Brooklyn Sea-Gate (Coney Island) Marathon Race"(p. 208).) According to the New York Times, Clark also set an American record in a 20-mile race on November 14, 1909 (1:57:27 3-5).

Approximately 110,000 spectators were reported to have turned out to see 180 runners compete in the New Jersey Athletic Club Marathon. With "scorching heat" noted to have affected many of the athletes, Clark recorded a time of 3:22:07 that was good enough for third place behind James Crowley of the Irish American Athletic Club and Harry Jensen of the Pastime Athletic Club.

On October 12, 1909, Clark competed in a fifteen-mile run described as the "feature event" Columbus Day games organized by the Emerald Athletic Club in Westchester, New York. He placed third behind Jensen and F.P Devlin of the Mott Haven Athletic Club.

On November 27, 1909, Clark finished seventh in the third edition of the Yonkers Marathon (3:01:21). He ran for the Xaiver Athletic Club and was later elected the President of the Long Island Athletic Club.

== Notes ==
Records
Preceded by (United States) Robert Fowler	Men's Marathon World Record Holder; February 12, 1909 – May 8, 1909* (*see explanation in the Notes section)	Succeeded by (United States) Albert Raines
