= Yonkers Marathon =

Annual marathon in Yonkers, New York, US

- Date: September or October
- Location: Yonkers, New York, U.S.
- Event type: Road
- Distance: Marathon
- Established: 1907 (119 years ago)
- Website: https://theyonkersmarathon.com/
- Participants: 103 finishers (2019)

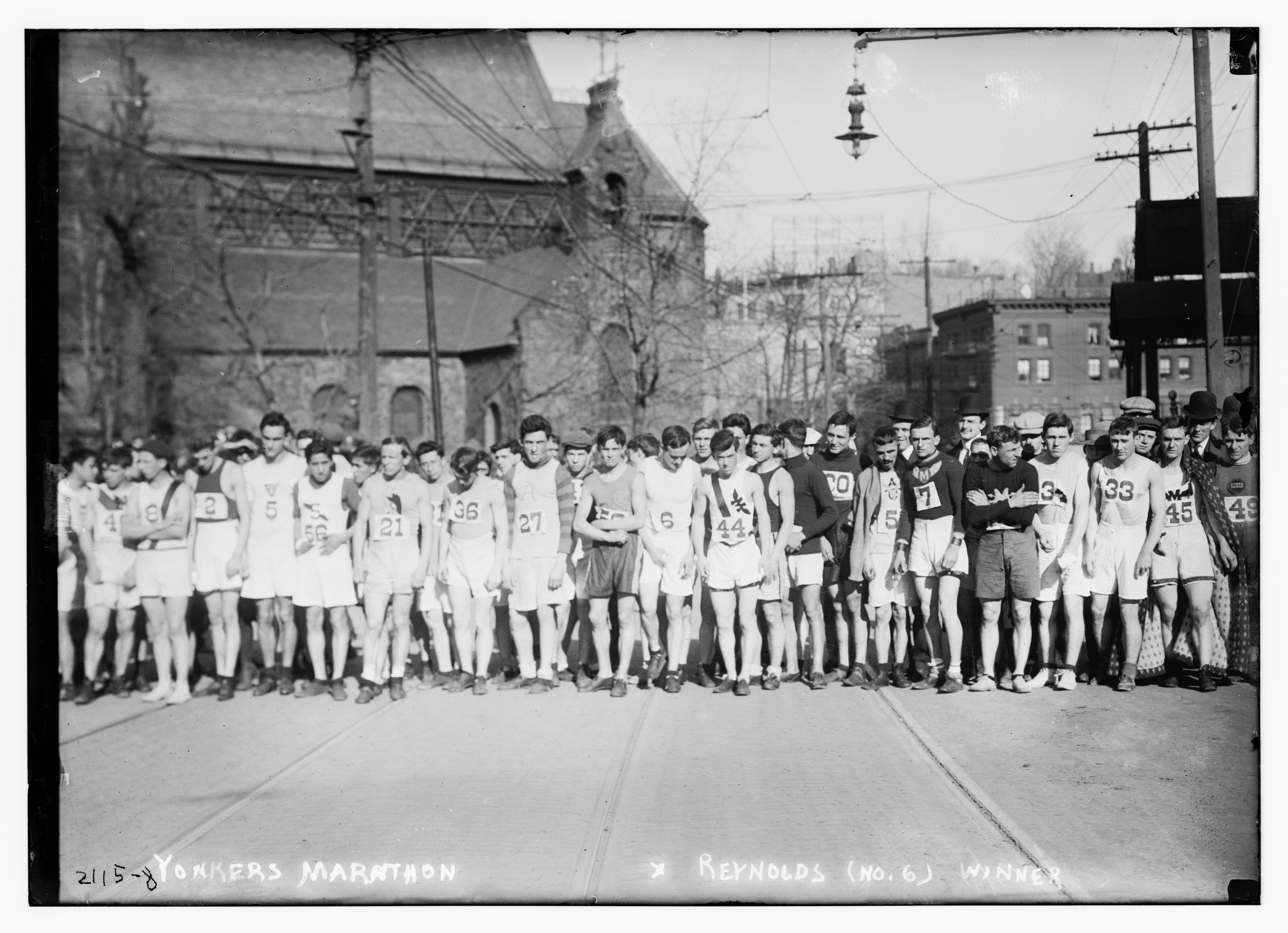
Winner John Reynolds (number 6) lining up with other runners in 1910

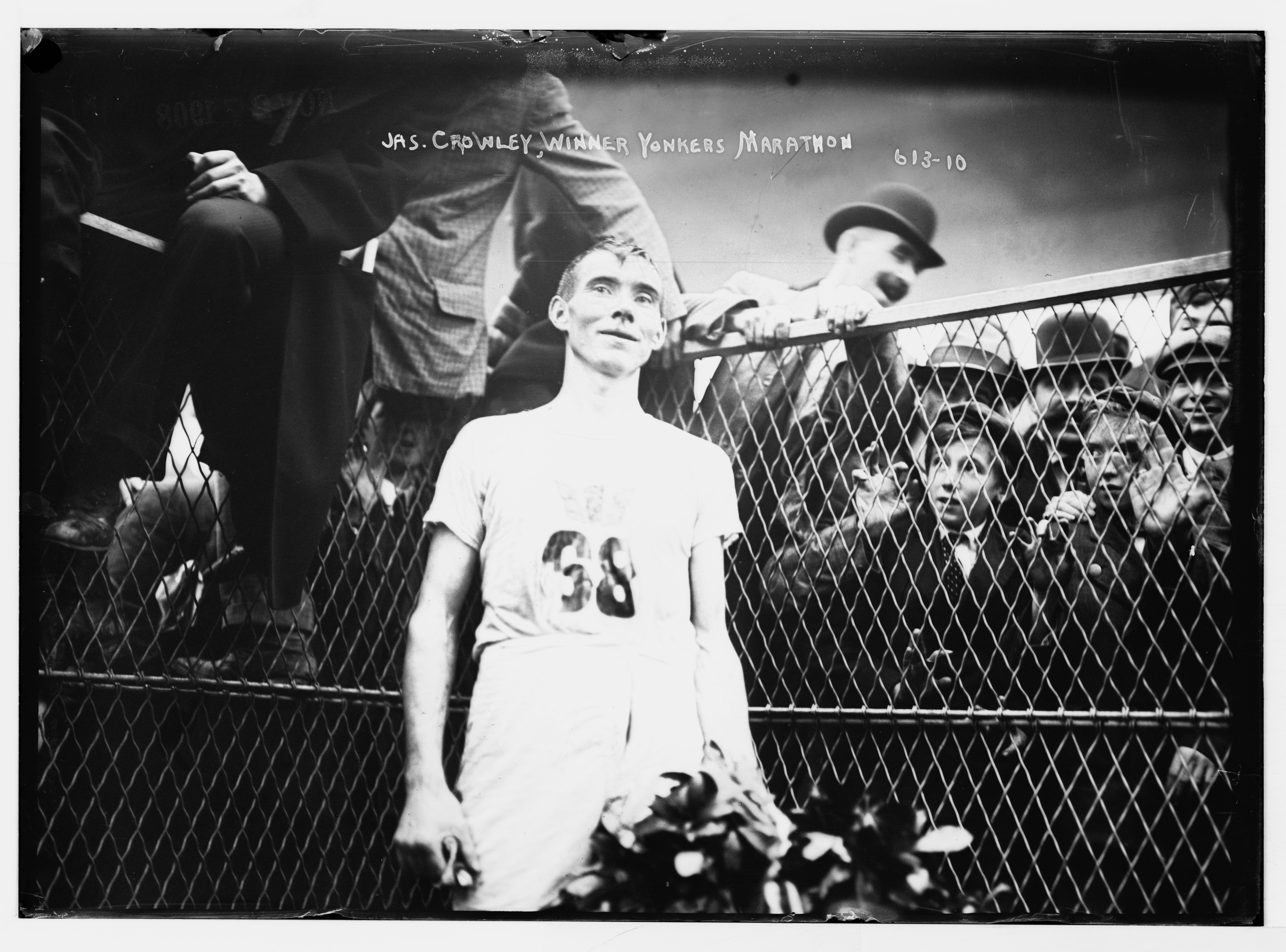
Jim Crowley, the winner in 1908

The Yonkers Marathon, is a marathon race held annually in Yonkers, New York. Founded in 1907, it is the second oldest marathon in the United States, after the Boston Marathon. It is held on the third Sunday in October. In addition to the marathon, there is a half marathon race and a 5K course. At the end of the race there is a gathering and festivities centered on Van de Donck Park.

== History ==
The first Yonkers Marathon was held on Thanksgiving Day 1907. Johnny Hayes and Jim Crowley won the first two races. (Note: Some references incorrectly state that Robert Fowler broke Johnny Hayes' world best in the marathon at the 1909 Yonkers Marathon. Fowler's mark was actually set at the Empire City Marathon on January 1, 1909.) Sammy Mellor helped establish the Yonkers Marathon with Edward Wetmore Kinsley, and finished second in the event's first two runnings. In 1909 the race was sponsored by the Mercury Athletic Club.

From 1938 to 1965, and again in 1974, the Yonkers Marathon was recognised by the Amateur Athletic Union as the USA Marathon Championships, and in relevant years as a qualifying event for the US Olympic team.

The race has averaged roughly 200 finishers during the 2010s, double the number from the prior decade. The 2015 (90th anniversary) course was USA Track & Field certified and served as a qualifying event for the Boston Marathon.

The 2020 edition of the race was cancelled due to the coronavirus pandemic, with all registrants automatically receiving refunds.

The 2022 edition saw 101 finishers and Juan Fernandez De Cordova won the event in 2 hours, 48 minutes and 3 seconds.

In 2023, 80 runners finished, led by Scottie Mitchell among the men with a time of 2 hours, 38 minutes and 48 seconds and Christine Honor among the women with 3 hours, 38 minutes and 56 seconds. The race in 2024 was completed by 166 competitors. Julio Sauce was the fastest man with a time of 2 hours, 59 minutes and 30 seconds while Cathrine Levine led the women with 3 hours, 22 minutes and 7 seconds.

== Course ==
External image
- Course map of full marathon in 2017

The double-loop course of the Yonkers Marathon has been known as being tough and hilly; New York City Marathon founder Fred Lebow cited it as one of his favorite marathons. For its 90th running in 2015, the track had a newly designed course that added greater variety by eliminating the double-loop, and replacing it with a single-loop that followed a scenic route along the Hudson River, and then through the city, past parks, past the Dunwoodie Golf Course (offering a glimpse of the distant New York City skyline), and through a variety of neighborhoods. In 2016, the course reverted to the double-loop.

== Winners ==
Key: (†) United States National Marathon Champion

Winners by year
Year	Men's Winner	Time	Women's Winner	Time
1907	John Hayes	2:44:45		
1908	Jim Crowley	2:49:16		
1909	Henry Jensen	2:46:43		
1910	John J. Reynolds	2:38:36		
1911	Sidney Hatch	2:36:06		
1913	James Duffy	2:39:29		
1913	Nick Gianakopulos	1:23:42		
1914	William Galvin	3:03:58		
1915	Harry Parkinson	2:40:59		
1916	Willie Kyrönen	2:51:58		
1917	Joe Giorgio	2:59:51		
1918	Race canceled due to the great influenza epidemic.			
1919	Yonkers Marathon not held again until 1935.			
1935	Johnny Kelley	2:38:43		
1936	Mel Porter	2:41:34		
1937	Pat Dengis	2:42:59		
1938	Pat Dengis^{†}	2:39:38		
1939	Pat Dengis^{†}	2:33:45		
1940	Gérard Côté	2:34:06		
1941	Bernard Joseph Smith ^{†}	2:36:06		
1942	Frederick McGlone ^{†}	2:37:54		
1943	Gérard Côté	2:38:35		
1944	Charles Robbins ^{†}	2:40:48		
1945	Charles Robbins^{†}	2:37:14		
1946	Gérard Côté	2:47:53		
1947	Theodore Vogel^{†}	2:40:11		
1948	Johnny Kelley ^{†}	2:48:32		
1949	Vic Dyrgall ^{†}	2:38:48		
1950	Johnny Kelley^{†}	2:45:55		
1951	Jesse Van Zant ^{†}	2:37:12		
1952	Vic Dyrgall^{†}	2:38.24		
1953	Gösta Leandersson	2:48:12		
1954	Ted Corbitt ^{†}	2:46:13		
1955	Nick Costes ^{†}	2:31:12		
1956	John J. Kelley^{†}	2:24:52		
1957	John J. Kelley^{†}	2:24:55		
1958	John J. Kelley^{†}	2:21:00		
1959	John J. Kelley ^{†}	2:21:54		
1960	John J. Kelley^{†}	2:20:13		
1961	John J. Kelley ^{†}	2:26:53		
1962	John J. Kelley ^{†}	2:27:39		
1963	John J. Kelley ^{†}	2:25:17		
1964	Leonard Edelen ^{†}	2:24:25		
1965	Garnett "Gar" Williams ^{†}	2:33:50		
1966	Norm Higgins ^{†}	2:22:50		
1967	Jim McDonagh	2:30:07		
1968	Gary Muhrcke	2:32:42		
1969	Gary Muhrcke	2:33:11		
1970	Gary Muhrcke	2:31:10	Nina Kuscsik	3:16:02
1971	Bill Harvey	2:35:41		
1972	Max White	2:29:42	Nina Kuscsik	3:22:21
1973	Norbert Sander	2:25:57	Nina Kuscsik	2:58:50
1974	Ron Wayne ^{†}	2:18:52	Nina Kuscsik	3:00:01
1975	Marty Sudzina	2:27:38	Chloe Foote	4:23:08
1976	Ray Hall	2:27:59	Lynn Blackstone	3:39:12
1977	Peter Squires	2:31:15	Nina Kuscsik	3:13:17
1978	Fritz Mueller	2:28:30	Nina Kuscsik	3:01:29
1979	Dan Murray	2:27:29	Nina Kuscsik	3:03:57
1980	Peter Squires	2:27:46	Kathleen Horton	2:59:22
1981	Peter Squires	2:24:10	Janice Arenz	2:52:38
1982	Ray Hall	2:33:18	Janice Arenz	3:04:32
1983	John McNulty	2:24:22	Mary Sheridan	3:17:56
1984	Bill Hart	2:39:44	Kathleen Horton	3:08:17
1985	Placido Cruz-Martin	2:35:04	Eileen Brennan	3:08:46
1986	Danny Dickenson	2:25:00	Anna Thornhill	3:10:26
1987	Danny Dickenson	2:26:24	Christine Gibbons	2:58:16
1988	Randy Crist	2:35:34	Christiane Avin	3:31:24
1989	Danny Dickenson	2:20:37	Christine Gibbons	2:55:12
1990	Doug Kurtis	2:26:36	Nancy Kelly	2:57:38
1991	Mohamed Idris	2:24:15	Christine Gibbons	2:55:13
1992	Trevor Murray	2:34:02	Christine Gibbons	2:53:05
1993	Jairo Correa	2:28:14	Diane Miller	3:03:11
1994	Trevor Murray	2:40:25	Christine Gibbons	3:01:33
1995	Esteban Vanegas	2:29:52	Nancy Kelly	3:04:14
1996	Prisco Huerta	2:42:49	Ellen McCurtin	2:55:13
1997	Jeff Bolles	2:36:20	Anna Thornhill	3:23:57
1998	Prisco Huerta	2:29:46	Nancy Kelly	3:11:14
1999	Trevor Murray	2:32:30	Milkah Jepchirchir	2:56:17
2000	Srba Nikolic	2:29:44	Ellen McCurtin	3:04:17
2001	Race canceled due to the September 11 attacks.			
2002	Rafael A Veras	2:37:32	Leteyesus Berhe	2:34:33
2003	Retta Feyissa	2:30:26	Heidi Shea	3:30:57
2004	Retta Feyissa	2:28:41	Jill Vollweiler	3:11:19
2005	Retta Feyissa	2:28:35	Jill Vollweiler	2:55:12
2006	Retta Feyissa	2:32:14	Hermela Romero	3:07:58
2007	Derese Deniboba	2:30:33	Hermela Romero	3:11:38
2008	Derese Deniboba	2:27:35	Hermela Romero	3:17:52
2009	Derese Deniboba	2:30:33	Muliye Gurmu	2:54:38
2010	Fikadu Weyessa	2:26:39	Muliye Lemma	2:54:10
2011	Will Guzick	2:44:33	Patrice Kentner	3:29:59
2012	Michael Arnstein	2:35:10	Margaret Duggan	3:10:55
2013	Oz Pearlman	2:35:50	Blanca Lucero	3:19:29
2014	Oz Pearlman	2:37:56	Catherine Shallow	3:18:07
2015	Matt Collins	2:44:34	Patrice Kentner	3:37:06
2016	Roberto Puente	2:44:05	Blanca Lucero	3:14:29
2017	Antonio Herrera	2:43:46	Blanca Lucero	3:12:23
2018	Salvador Angelpere	2:55:52	Blanca Lucero	3:15:27
2019	Antonio Herreraort	2:32:19	Blanca Lucero	3:13:28
2020	Race canceled due to the COVID-19 pandemic.			
2021	Race again canceled due to the COVID-19 pandemic.			
2022	Juan Fernandez De Cordova	2:48:03	Rebecca Payne	3:51:42
2023	Scottie Mitchell	2:38:47	Christine Honor	3:38:56
2024	Julio Sauce	2:59.29	Cathrine Levine	3:22.07
2025	Juan Fernando	3:01:32	Eve Aronoff	3:08.32
