= Pat Dengis =

American long-distance runner

Pat Dengis (July 18, 1902 – December 17, 1939) was an American long-distance runner. He was AAU marathon champion in 1935, 1938 and 1939 and marathon world leader in 1938.

== Biography ==
Joseph Franz "Pat" Dengis was born in Swansea, Wales. Dengis worked as a seaman until his emigration to the United States in 1926; he settled in Baltimore, Maryland, where he became a steel mill worker. Later, he worked as a toolmaker and airplane mechanic for the Glenn L. Martin Company, a job he held until his death.

Dengis took up running in Baltimore; he placed fifth at the Port Chester Marathon in 1932 and fourth in 1933 before scoring his first victory in 1934. In 1935 he placed second behind John A. Kelley at the Boston Marathon (2:34:11.2) and won the AAU national championship marathon in Washington in 2:53:53. After gaining US citizenship in October 1935, Dengis entered 1936 as one of the leading candidates to qualify for the American Olympic team, but in both of the Olympic tryout races (the 1936 Boston Marathon and the 1936 AAU championship marathon) he suffered from medical problems; he failed to finish in Boston, and dropped from the lead to eighth place in the AAU race.

Dengis won the marathon at the 1937 Pan American Games in Dallas, defeating José Ribas in 2:42:43. (Note: The 1937 Pan American Games (held as part of the Greater Texas & Pan-American Exposition) are not considered part of the official Pan American Games history, which only goes back to the 1951 meet.) In 1938 he won the Salisbury Beach Marathon in 2:30:27.6, the fastest time in the world that year; he also regained his AAU championship title by winning the Yonkers Marathon. He repeated as national champion in 1939, breaking the Yonkers Marathon course record with his time of 2:33:45.2; the race also served as a tryout for the ultimately cancelled 1940 Summer Olympics in Helsinki.

Despite his successes, Dengis never won the Boston Marathon. In the last two years of his career he won nine marathons and lost only two – the 1938 and 1939 Boston Marathons. In the 1938 Boston Marathon he placed second behind Les Pawson; in 1939 he caught a cold before the race and placed fourth as Ellison "Tarzan" Brown broke the course record.

Dengis died in an airplane crash near Baltimore on December 17, 1939.
