= Robert Fowler (athlete) =

Canadian-American long-distance runner

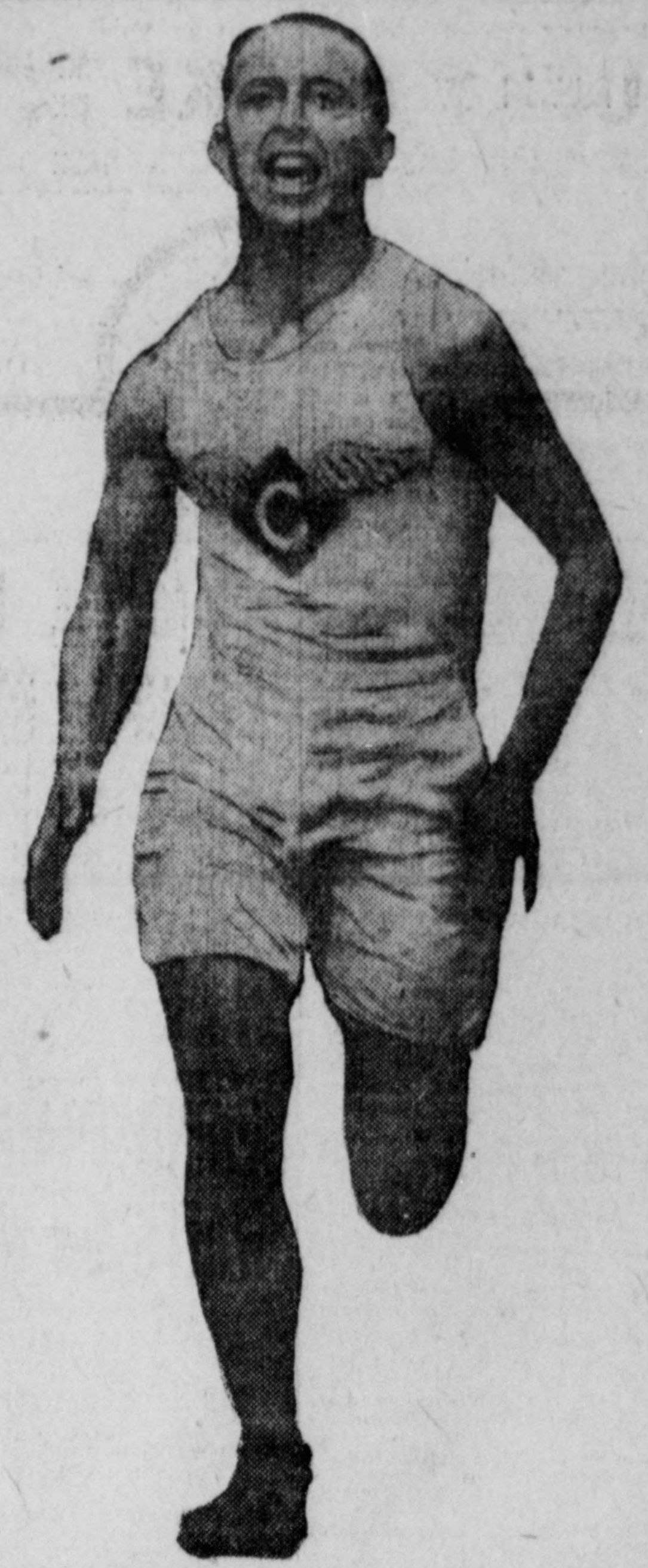
- Fowler finishing in second place at the 1907 Boston Marathon

Personal information
- Nationality: Newfoundlander/American
- Born: Robert Arthur Fowler; September 18, 1882 Trinity, Newfoundland
- Died: October 8, 1957 (aged 75)

Sport
- Sport: Long-distance running
- Event: Marathon

Robert Arthur Fowler (18 September 1882 – 8 October 1957) (Note: Fowler is known to have visited Rome, Ireland, and Newfoundland in 1954 before returning to Malden, Massachusetts. An endnote in Fred Mason's article refers to a 1981 interview between Robert Fowler and the late Frank Graham, original archivist with the Sport Archives of Newfoundland and Labrador. However, this reference is based on a misinterpretation of an ambiguous reference in Fowler's entry in the Encyclopedia of Newfoundland and Labrador (under the name "Fowlow") to an interview with Graham by the author of the encyclopedia entry, Bertram G. Riggs. The reference simply reads "Frank Graham, interview (Dec. 1981)".) was a Newfoundland-born long-distance runner who was recognized by the International Association of Athletics Federations as having set a world's best in the marathon on January 1, 1909 with a time of 2:52:45.4 at the Empire City Marathon in Yonkers, New York. (Note: Many references incorrectly refer to this race as the Yonkers Marathon. The Yonkers Marathon, which during the early 1900s was traditionally run during late November, was won over a month earlier by Jim Crowley. Running Times has referred to the New Year's Day race as the Yonkers Empire City Marathon.)

== Early life ==
Fowler was born in Trinity, Newfoundland to Capt. Patrick Joseph Fowlow Sr. and Mary Anne Connolly, the youngest of seven. His father was the captain of the ill-fated SS Lion, who lost his life on January 6, 1882, before Robert was born. Robert, along with his brothers attended Saint Bonaventure's College in St. John's. He emigrated with his family to Boston, sailing from Port aux Basques in June 1901, and was living at 76 Berkshire Street, Cambridge, Massachusetts at the time of the 1904 Olympic games. Fowler is the first Newfoundland-born Olympic marathoner and, as he did not become a US citizen until September 16, 1907, is considered by some to be the first Newfoundland Olympian. (Note: Fred Mason wrote: "...Fowler did not take attestation of US citizenship until September 16, 1907. This means, technically, that he was still a citizen of the Dominion of Newfoundland when he competed in 1904, confirming his place as the first Newfoundland Olympian, whatever jersey he wore." However, the Dominion of Newfoundland was not formed until 1907. Prior to then, the territory had the status of a British colony.)

== Marathon running ==
Fowler competed for the United States in the marathon at the 1904 Summer Olympics in St. Louis, Missouri as well as the 1906 Intercalated Games in Athens, Greece. He did not finish either race. (Note: Conditions were reported to be poor for both races and less than half of the starters would finish either one.) Including the 1906 Games, Fowler was a three-time member of the United States Olympic Marathon Team.

Fowler finished third in the 1905 Boston Marathon behind Fred Lorz and Louis Marks. Two years later in Boston, he finished second to Thomas Longboat in a race in which he was blocked by a freight train in Framingham, Massachusetts for approximately two minutes. Fowler was in a second pack of runners that was separated from Longboat's lead pack when the train crossed the tracks. He competed in a total of nine Boston Marathons between 1903 and 1912, missing the 1906 running because it conflicted with the Olympic Games.

== Coaching ==
Fowler helped train athletes at Harvard University for several years during his running career. In 1913, he became the track coach at the Volkmann School. Accepting a paid coaching position meant that Fowler was no longer an amateur athlete and ended his running career. In 1914, he was the coach of the cross country team at Princeton University. From 1914 to 1915, he was the supervisor of athletics in the Manchester, New Hampshire playgrounds department. In 1916, he was hired to coach the track and ice hockey teams at Boston College.

In 1918, he received a commission as a second lieutenant in the United States Army Air Service, Sanitary Corps, National Army.

In 1921, Fowler became the trainer for the Williams College football team. The following year, he coached the school's swim team. In 1922, he became an athletic instructor for the Brazilian Navy. He returned to the United States in 1935 and became the director of playgrounds and recreation for Medford, Massachusetts.

== See also ==
- Ronald J. MacDonald

Records
Preceded by (United States) Johnny Hayes	Men's Marathon World Record Holder; January 1, 1909 – February 12, 1909	Succeeded by (United States) James Clark
