= Joe Smith (athlete) =

American marathon runner

Personal information
- Nationality: American
- Born: Bernard Joseph Smith; 1917 Medford, Massachusetts
- Died: January 25, 1993 (aged 77) Pembroke Pines, Florida
- Height: 6 ft 2 in (188 cm)
- Weight: 257 lb (117 kg)
Medal record
World Marathon Majors
Gold medal – first place	1942 Boston	Marathon

Bernard Joseph Smith (1917 – January 25, 1993) was an American marathon runner. He was the winner of the 1942 Boston Marathon with a course record of 2:26:51. His record lasted for five years until it was broken by 1947 Boston Marathon winner Suh Yun-bok. At Boston, Smith came in fifth place at the 1941 and 1949 marathons. Outside Boston, he won the 1941 USA Marathon Championships at the Yonkers Marathon.

== Early life ==
In 1917, Smith was born in Medford, Massachusetts.

== Career ==
Smith was a milkman before he began marathon running in 1940. His first World Marathon Majors races were at the 1940 and 1941 Boston Marathon. In 1941, he won the USA Marathon Championships during the Yonkers Marathon. The following year, Smith wanted to sit out the 1942 Boston Marathon while he recuperated from the flu. After his wife convinced him to compete, Smith won the marathon and set a course record of 2:26:51. Smith stopped running in 1942 when he enlisted to the United States Coast Guard and served three years during World War II.

Upon his return from the war, Smith did not compete from 1945 to 1946 and resumed running at the 1947 Boston Marathon. Smith did not finish the 1947 marathon while his five year course record was broken by winner Suh Yun-bok. In the following Boston races, he did not finish in 1948 and placed in 5th at his last marathon in 1949. Outside Boston, Smith was runner-up in the 1947 Western Hemisphere Marathon. He also came in 5rh at the 1959 Yonkers Marathon and ran at the 1949 Western Hemisphere Marathon. After ending his marathon career, Smith continued working as a milkman until 1957. Smith moved on work for a post office for three decades before retiring in 1987.

== Achievements ==
Year	Competition	Venue	Position	Event	Notes
Representing United States
1940	Boston Marathon	Boston, United States	19th	Marathon	
1941	Boston Marathon	Boston, United States	5th	Marathon	
1942	Boston Marathon	Boston, United States	1st	Marathon	2:26:51
1947	Boston Marathon	Boston, United States	DNF	Marathon	
1948	Boston Marathon	Boston, United States	DNF	Marathon	
1949	Boston Marathon	Boston, United States	5th	Marathon	2:38:30

== Personal life ==
Smith was married and had three children.

== Death ==
Smith died on January 25, 1993, in Pembroke Pines, Florida.
