= 2022 USA Marathon Championships =

2022 running of the USA Marathon Championship

2022 USA Marathon Championship
- Venue: Sacramento, California, United States
- Date: December 4, 2022
- Competitors: 84 Women + 78 Men; 162

Champions
- Men: Futsum Zienasellassie (2:11:01)
- Women: Paige Stoner (2:26:02)

The 2022 USA Marathon Championships were held in Sacramento, California organized by USA Track and Field, Sacramento Running Association at California International Marathon. It served as the national championships in marathon for the United States. The results of the event contribute to determined Team USA for the 2023 World Athletics Championships.

== Results ==
=== Men ===
Elite men's top 10 finishers
Place	Athlete	Time
1st place, gold medalist(s)	Futsum Zienasellassie	2:11:01
2nd place, silver medalist(s)	Jacob Thomson	2:11:52
3rd place, bronze medalist(s)	Joel Reichow	2:12:11
4	John Raneri	2:12:33
5	Daniel Mesfun	2:12:47
6	Eddie Owens	2:13:25
7	Matthew McClintock	2:14:00
8	Joseph Whelan	2:14:41
9	Matthew Llano	2:14:56
10	Louis Serafini	2:14:59

=== Women ===
Elite Women's top 10 finishers
Place	Athlete	Time
1st place, gold medalist(s)	Paige Stoner	2:26:02
2nd place, silver medalist(s)	Lauren Hurley	2:27:41
3rd place, bronze medalist(s)	Elaina Tabb	2:28:04
4	Bria Wetsch	2:28:35
5	Katja Goldring	2:29:01
6	Kate Sanborn	2:29:19
7	Maegan Krifchin	2:29:21
8	Gabriella Rooker	2:29:44
9	Neely Gracey	2:30:29
10	Julia Griffey	2:30:35
