= Albert Raines =

American athlete

Albert "Al" Raines (?? – ??) was an American long-distance runner who is recognized as having set a world's best in the marathon on May 8, 1909, with a time of 2:46:04 3-5 at the Bronx Marathon. (Note: According to the progression of world bests listed by the International Association of Athletics Federations (IAAF), James Clark set a world best of 2:46:52.8 in New York on February 12, 1909, Albert Raines broke Clark's mark with a 2:46:04.6 in New York on May 8, 1909, and Henry Barrett broke Raines' mark with a 2:42:31.0 in London on May 26, 1909. Ian Ridpath, a former director of the Polytechnic marathon, has indicated on his website that some sources have wrongly listed the date of Barrett performance as May 26, 1909, and has confirmed the true date as May 8, 1909. An article in The Times dated May 10, 1909, provides strong evidence that Ridpath is correct. Given that Barrett's marathon in London most likely concluded before Raines' marathon held on the same date in New York, it is also likely that Barrett rather than Raines broke the world best set by Clark three months earlier.) (Note: Spalding's Official Athletic Almanac for 1910 indicates that name of the marathon as the "Northwestern A.C. Marathon".) Described as a former member of the Xavier Athletic Association, he won the race by over a mile. Raines competed in at least five marathons and a 20 miler in a three-month period from February 8, 1909, to May 31, 1909. On February 8, 1909, he won an "amateur marathon" in Brooklyn, New York, and on My 8th he won the Bronx Amateur Marathon.

On July 14, 1909, he resigned from the Amateur Athletic Union.

== Notes ==
Records
Preceded by (United States) James Clark	Men's Marathon World Record Holder; May 8, 1909 – May 26, 1909* (*see explanation in the Notes section)	Succeeded by (United Kingdom) Henry Barrett
