= Athletics at the 1983 Summer Universiade – Women's marathon =

The women's marathon at the 1983 Summer Universiade was held in Edmonton, Canada on 9 July 1983. It was the first time that the event was contested by women at the Universiade.

== Results ==
Rank	Athlete	Nationality	Time	Notes
1st place, gold medalist(s)	Sarah Rowell	Great Britain	2:47:37	
2nd place, silver medalist(s)	Kathy Roberts	Canada	2:52:47	
3rd place, bronze medalist(s)	Marjorie Kaput	United States	2:54:03	
4	María Trujillo	Mexico	2:57:33	
	Bev Bush	Canada	DNF	
	Lorrie Dividorff	United States	DNF	
	Bev McKay	Canada	DNF	
	Naomi Kurahashi	Japan	DNF	
