= Ted Vogel =

American marathon runner (1925–2019)

Theodore John Vogel (July 17, 1925 – September 27, 2019) was an American marathon runner who competed in the 1948 Summer Olympics, finishing in 14th place with a time of 2:45:27, about ten and a half minutes behind the winner. Studying at Tufts University in Massachusetts in the mid-1940s, he competed for the Tufts Jumbos followed by the B.A.A., winning national titles in the 10,000 meters (1945) and the marathon (1947) in the Yonkers Marathon. He qualified for the Olympic team after finishing second in the Boston Marathon in the spring of 1948 behind four-time winner Gérard Côté.

== Marathon results ==
Year	Event	Venue	Place	Time
1947	Boston Marathon	Boston, Massachusetts	3rd	2:30:10
1947	Yonkers Marathon	Yonkers, New York	1st	2:40:11
1948	Boston Marathon	Boston, Massachusetts	2nd	2:31:09
1948	Olympic Games	London, England	14th	2:45:27
