= Keith Brantly =

American long-distance runner (born 1962)

Personal information
- Full name: Keith Alan Brantly
- Nationality: American
- Born: May 23, 1962 (age 64) Scott Air Force Base, Illinois
- Height: 5 ft 11 in (1.80 m)
- Weight: 141 lb (64 kg)

Sport
- Sport: Track and field
- Events: Marathon, 10,000 meters
- College team: Florida

Achievements and titles
- Personal bests: 1500m: 3:41.15; 3000m: 7:51.97; 5000m: 13:36.88; 10,000m: 28:10.1 ½ marathon: 1:01:30; Marathon: 2:12:31
Medal record
Representing the United States
Men's cross country running
World Cross Country Championships
Bronze medal – third place	1981 Madrid	Junior race
Men's track and field
Summer Universiade
Gold medal – first place	1985 Kobe	10,000m

Keith Alan "KB" Brantly (born May 23, 1962) is an American former professional long-distance runner who contended in the men's marathon at the 1996 Summer Olympics in Atlanta, Georgia. Brantly finished twenty-eighth of one hundred and eleven runners who completed the race, in a time of 2:18:17. He is recognized for his extensive distance-running career that encompasses nearly three decades at distances that range from one mile to a marathon.

He graduated from the University of Florida with a bachelor's degree in exercise and sports science in 1986, and was later inducted into the University of Florida Athletic Hall of Fame as a "Gator Great."

== Running career ==
=== High school (1976-1980) ===
When Brantly was at Winter Haven High School in 1976, he joined the cross-country team, coached by Buck Dawson. Dawson is a member of Morehead State University Hall of Fame who later went to coach high school cross-country and track in 1979 where he guided two runners to be future Olympians. When Brantly's running career soared as an individual in the fall of his senior year during the cross-country season, Dawson saw the potential he held. Brantly and one of his most memorable competitors, Basil Magee from Largo High School, challenged each other in multiple encounters such as the 1979 Astronaut Invitational and the 1979 Winter Haven Invitational, with Brantly falling just seconds behind Magee in both encounters. Towards the seasons end, there were two teams preparing for battle at the cross-country state championships in DeLand, Florida, Largo High School and Astronaut High School. All the while, Brantly was preparing for the title as champion. In the Florida class 4A High School State Cross Country Championships, Brantly (14:18) took an early lead to finally defeated Magee (14:30) in a rigorous five thousand meter footrace. Throughout the remainder of his senior year, Brantly and Magee grew closer in ability and competitiveness that carried into the spring track season. In 1980, Brantly would go to the Florida class 4A High School State Track Championships and win the 2-mile event in the time of 9:13. Brantly and Magee's competitive relationship did not stop at the state level, but at the national level where Magee (9:02) would outkick Brantly (9:03) at the 2-mile Postal Meet for the win.

- 1979 - Florida Class 4A High School State Cross Country Champion (14:18)
- 1980 - Florida Class 4A High School Track and Field 2 mile Champion (9:13)

=== College (1980-1986) ===
Brantly attended the University of Florida in Gainesville, Florida, where he would run collegiate cross-country and track under Coach John Randolph. As a college student athlete, naturally, it was easy to get distracted and lazy Brantly said. Randolph helped instill the discipline that he lacked. During his time as a Gator, Brantly continued to thrive as a runner by winning two Southeastern Conference (SEC) 10,000 meter championships. In an interview he explains that these were no easy feat, “The University of Florida places a high emphasis on the SEC so winning was a very big deal.” Winning at this level played a huge role in his running career because it would later aid him in his quest for the Olympic team.

- 1982 - SEC 10,000 m Champion (30:18.23)
- 1982 - 5th place in 2 mile at NCAA Indoor Championships (8:49.92)
- 1983 - SEC 10,000 m Champion (29:48.1)
- 1983 - 5th place in 10,000 m at NCAA Championships (29:45.95)
- 1983 - SEC Cross Country Champion
- 1984 - 7th place in 10,000 m at NCAA Championships (28:39.82)

=== After College (1986-1998) ===
Following his collegiate career with the Florida Gators, he was mentored by David Martin who compiled his knowledge to transform him “from a talented runner to a seasoned competitor” Brantly said. His competitive spirit and love for the sport continued to push him to further distances. The furthest distances he competed in before were the 5,000 meters, the 10,000 meters and an eighteen-mile training run. Brantly would run his first marathon (2:20:35) in Honolulu, Hawaii, and found that the training for this distance alone was a challenge in itself. In the 1993 New York City Marathon, Brantly (2:12:51) continued to improve placing fifth behind the elite marathoners. In the 1994 Boston Marathon (2:13:00), he trained to finish in the top five but fell behind at the halfway point, finishing twentieth.

With years of experience and failing to make the United States Olympic team twice in previous years, Brantly's drive to make the team in 1996 was his main focus. At the 1996 Olympic Trials Marathon, Brantly used his previous failed attempts and knowledge from the New York and Boston Marathons to strategize making the team. “My strategy at the 1996 Trials was to sit back, draft and stay warm until the final three players became clear.” Brantly said. Paul Zimmerman led the race until the fifteen mile marker where Bob Kempainen, Mark Coogan, and Keith Brantly would take control for the final 10,000 meters. Brantly would finish in a time of 2:13:22 placing third and locking him into the US Olympic team. At the 1996 Summer Olympic Games in Atlanta, Georgia, Brantly gathered his thoughts and strategies for the biggest stage an athlete can compete on. He finished representing the United States in a time of 2:18:27 placing twenty-eighth.

== Competition record ==
Year	Competition	Venue	Position	Event	Notes
Representing the United States
1981	World Junior Cross Country Championships	Madrid, Spain	3rd	Junior race	22:07
1985	Summer Universiade	Kobe, Japan	1st	10,000 m	29:11.24
1985	USA 10 km Road Championships	Asbury Park, New Jersey	1st	10 km	28:39
1987	USA 10 km Road Championships	Asbury Park, New Jersey	1st	10 km	28:47
1988	USA Outdoor Track and Field Championships	Tampa, Florida	2nd	5,000 m	13:45.16
1988	US Olympic Trials	Indianapolis, Indiana	4th	5,000 m	13:47.87
1989	USA Outdoor Track and Field Championships	Houston, Texas	2nd	5,000 m	13:40.2
1989	USA 10 km Road Championships	Raleigh, North Carolina	1st	10 km	28:55
1992	US Olympic Trials Marathon	Columbus, Ohio	4th	Marathon	2:14:16
1993	USA 20 km Road Championships	New Haven, Connecticut	1st	20 km	59:55
1993	New York City Marathon	New York City, New York	5th	Marathon	2:12:49
1995	USA 10 km Road Championships	New Orleans, Louisiana	1st	10 km	29:12
1995	USA 25 km Road Championships	Grand Rapids, Michigan	1st	25 km	1:15:20
1995	USA Marathon Championships	Charlotte, North Carolina	1st	Marathon	2:14:27
1996	US Olympic Trials Marathon	Charlotte, North Carolina	3rd	Marathon	2:13:22
1996	Olympic Games	Atlanta, Georgia	28th	Marathon	2:18:27
1998	USA Marathon Championships	Pittsburgh, Pennsylvania	1st	Marathon	2:12:31

== Personal records ==
Event	Time
1500 m	3:40.7
5 km	13:36
10 km	28:02
15 km	42:50
Half-marathon	1:01:30
Marathon	2:12:31

== See also ==
- Florida Gators
- List of University of Florida alumni
- List of University of Florida Athletic Hall of Fame members
- List of University of Florida Olympians
