= Les Pawson =

American marathon runner

Les Pawson (February 3, 1905 in Pawtucket, Rhode Island – October 13, 1992) was an American marathon runner. Pawson worked in the mills of Rhode Island and for the city of Pawtucket parks department while he was one of the finest road runners in the United States.

Pawson's major competition was provided by John A. Kelley, Ellison Brown, and Gerard Cote. Pawson won the Boston Marathon in 1933, 1938, and 1941, becoming the second runner to win the race three times.

After his running career, Pawson returned to his daily life in Rhode Island working until he was 75 years old. He died in 1992 at the age of 87. A road race and his former training ground in Rhode Island are named for him such as the Les Pawson loop in Lincoln Rhode Island in which the distance is 2.49 miles.
