= Charles Robbins (athlete) =

American long-distance runner

Charles Robbins (1921–10 August 2006) was an American long distance runner and psychiatrist.

He won Amateur Athletic Union national titles, including five 20-kilometer titles, two 25-kilometer, two 30-kilometer and two national marathon championships between the years of 1944–54. In 1945, he ran the year's fastest marathon in the world. Robbins completed his 50th consecutive Manchester Road Race in 2001 and participated in 20 Boston Marathons. In April 1944 he finished third in 2:38:31 at Boston to four-time winner Canada's Gérard Côté and two-time champion (and seven-time runner up) John A. Kelley. Nine years later, he ran Boston in 2:43:56. On November 12, 1944, while in the U.S. Navy, he also won the U.S. national marathon championship at the Yonkers marathon, running 2:40.48.6. He was the alternate, in the event one of the three qualifiers was unable to run, to the 1948 London Olympic's marathon team. Remarkably, he often ran his races barefoot.
