= Katy Schilly =

American long-distance runner

Catherine ("Katy") Schilly-Laetsch (October 19, 1956) is a former American long-distance runner who is a United States national champion in the marathon. Schilly attended Iowa State University where she was an All-American in track and field and cross country. At the 1984 California International Marathon, she set a course record with a time of 2:32:40. Schilly also won the 1984 San Francisco Marathon (2:35:56).

== Achievements ==
- All results regarding marathon, unless stated otherwise

Year	Competition	Venue	Position	Notes
Representing the United States
1984	San Francisco Marathon	San Francisco, United States	1st	2:35:56
1984	California International Marathon	California State Capitol, United States	1st	2:32:40

Sporting positions
Preceded by (United States) Janis Klecker	San Francisco Marathon - Women's Winner; 1984	Succeeded by (Denmark) Kersti Jakobse
