= Nancy Ditz =

American long-distance runner

Nancy Ditz Mosbacher
Personal information
- Nationality: American
- Born: June 25, 1954 (age 72)
- Height: 5 ft 6 in (168 cm)
- Weight: 122 lb (55 kg)

Sport
- Sport: Athletics
- Event: Running
- College team: Stanford University '76
- Coached by: Rod Dixon
Medal record
Women's athletics
Representing the United States
Athletics at the Summer Olympics
	1988 Summer Olympics	Marathon
IAAF World Women's Road Race Championships
Bronze medal – third place	IAAF World 1985 Championships Gateshead	15 km
Bronze medal – third place	IAAF World 1986 Championships Lisbon	15 km
IAAF World Championships in Athletics
	1987 World Championships	Marathon

Nancy Jane Ditz (born June 25, 1954, in San Jose, California) is a former American long-distance runner who is a United States national champion in the marathon. Ditz competed in the marathon at the 1988 Summer Olympics.

In her debut marathon, Ditz won the 1982 San Francisco Marathon (2:44:34). She also set a course record at the 1985 California International Marathon with a time of 2:31:36. Nancy worked to promote the 2009 Los Angeles Marathon with fellow Olympians Rod Dixon and Ed Eyestone.

Nancy Ditz Mosbacher is a member of the 1988 United States Olympic team. She finished first among American (17th overall) in the Athletics at the 1988 Summer Olympics – Women's marathon. Ditz Mosbacher graduated from Stanford while competing as a diver and crew member, and did not begin running competitively until age 25. Ditz's husband, Bruce Mosbacher, was a goalkeeper on the Stanford soccer team; their son, Jack Mosbacher, was a member of Stanford's baseball team; and daughter, Emily Mosbacher, was a member of the Harvard Women's Soccer Team.

She quickly found herself naturally talented in the sport. In 1982, she won her debut marathon, the San Francisco Marathon in 2:44:34. In between her debut and making the Olympic team, Ditz Mosbacher won numerous road races, including the U.S. National Marathon Championships (1985), the Los Angeles Marathon (1986, 1987), the San Francisco Marathon (1982), the Oakland Marathon (1983), and Bay to Breakers (1984). In 1985, she set a course record at the California International Marathon with a time of 2:31:36. From the 1988 Summer Olympics, Ditz Mosbacher has been a color commentator for NBC and CBS Sports through the early 2000s. She has covered events such as the 1996 Olympic Marathon Trials, the 1988 and 1989 NCAA Track and Field Championships, and the 1994 Examiner Bay to Breakers earning her a spot in the 2019 Road Runners Club of America Hall of Fame Class.

Nancy has served on the boards of Castilleja School, USA Track & Field, World TEAM Sports, the Track & Field Foundation and the USOC Paralympic Advisory Committee (PAC), as well as several boards and committees at Stanford University.

== Achievements ==
Year	Competition	Venue	Position	Event	Notes
Representing the United States
1982	San Francisco Marathon	San Francisco, United States	1st	Marathon	2:44:34
1985	California International Marathon	Sacramento, United States	1st	Marathon	2:31:36
1986	Los Angeles Marathon	Los Angeles, United States	1st	Marathon	2:36:27
1987	Los Angeles Marathon	Los Angeles, United States	1st	Marathon	2:35:24
1987	World Championships	Rome, Italy	7th	Marathon	2:34:54
1988	Olympic Games	Seoul, South Korea	17th	Marathon	2:33:42

Sporting positions
Preceded by (United States) Laurie Binder	San Francisco Marathon - Women's Winner; 1982	Succeeded by (United States) Janis Klecker
