= San Francisco Marathon =

Annual race in the United States held since 1977

- Date: July
- Location: San Francisco, California, United States
- Event type: Road
- Distance: Marathon, Half Marathon, Ultramarathon, 10k, and 5K
- Established: 1977 (49 years ago)
- Website: www.thesfmarathon.com

The San Francisco Marathon is an annual USATF-certified road running event held in San Francisco, California, that includes a full marathon, two half marathons, an ultramarathon, a 10k, and a 5K. With the exceptions of 1988, 1993, and 2020, the marathon has been held annually since 1977. The marathon starts and finishes on the Embarcadero near the Ferry Building and crosses the Golden Gate Bridge. It is a qualifying race for the Boston Marathon.

== History ==
The first San Francisco Marathon was organized by the Pamakids Runners Club, and was held on July 10, 1977. The inaugural was won by Athol Barton, a taxicab driver from New Zealand who at the time lived in Reno, Nevada in a time of 2:24:59. Fewer than 900 ran this inaugural race. The event's all-time record for marathon finishers came in 1983 with 7,231. An estimated 7,800 runners participated in the various events in 2004 and 11,290 in 2005. This number had increased to approximately 19,000 in 2008 and 21,000 in 2009 The 2009 event was hosted by ultramarathoner Dean Karnazes and Runner's World columnist Bart Yasso. In 2025, the event sold out for the first time.

In 2005, 356 of the 4,873 finishers qualified for Boston. Of the 4,021 finishers in 2006, 277 qualified. 2010's race produced 462 qualifiers, 468 runners qualified in 2011, 377 qualified in 2012, and 2016's race produced 296 qualifiers. 2018's race produced 324 Boston Marathon qualifiers.

The purse has also varied from year to year. In 1977, Barton took home a t-shirt for his efforts. When Pete Pfitzinger won in 1986, he earned $5,000 and a new car. Although many top runners were attracted to the $35,000 purse that was offered in 1998 ($10,000 for first place, $5,000 for second place, $2,500 for third place), no prize money was offered from 1999 through 2001. From 2002 to 2004, $10,000 was divided among the winners. Prize money has not been offered since 2005, primarily due to lack of large sponsors.

The 2020 in-person edition of the race was cancelled due to the COVID-19 pandemic, with all registrants given the option of running the race virtually, or transferring their entry to 2021 for a US$39 fee. (Note: It had initially been postponed to 2020.11.15 before being cancelled.) The 2021 race was held on September 18–19th, 2021.

In 2022, a nonbinary division was added to the race.

In 2026, the marathon was won by Garrett Patrick of Daly City in 2:26:26, with Leandra Zimmerman of San Francisco winning the women's race in 2:45:16.

== Controversies ==
In 2024, organizers admitted to miscalculating the race distance for one of the half marathon races. Participants found out two days after the race that the course had only been 12.6 miles instead of 13.1. There are two half marathon races offered, a "city half" and a "bridge half"; the "city half" half-marathon was the course that was short.

== Course ==
The current marathon course forms a loop that starts and finishes on the Embarcadero near the Ferry Building. The course runs past many notable landmarks in San Francisco including Fisherman's Wharf, Aquatic Park, the Golden Gate Bridge, Golden Gate Park, and Oracle Park. The course briefly enters Marin County at the northern end of the Golden Gate Bridge.

The marathon course has undergone a number of changes since its inception. In the late 1980s, the start was moved from Marin County to San Francisco. In 1999, race organizers made a number of changes to make the course faster. That year the course was altered to start and end near the Polo Fields in Golden Gate Park and the run across the Golden Gate Bridge was eliminated. Previous routes have taken the marathon along the Great Highway. In 2002, the start/finish at Golden Gate Park was moved to the Embarcadero with a run across the Golden Gate Bridge.

The first half marathon originally crossed the Golden Gate Bridge along the full marathon, but was eliminated in 2018 due to security and safety concerns. Previously, the full marathon and first half marathon ran on the roadbed of the bridge, shutting down automobile traffic for two lanes.

There are two half-marathon races offered, a "Bridge Half", which ends near the Golden Gate Bridge, and a "City Half", which begins in Golden Gate Park.

== In popular culture ==
In 2002, the San Francisco Marathon was the fictionalized backdrop for an episode of Monk entitled "Mr. Monk and the Marathon Man."

== Winners ==
Date	Men	Country	Time	Women	Country	Time	Finishers
July 26, 2026	Garrett Patrick	United States	2:26:26	Leandra Zimmerman	United States	2:45:16	
July 27, 2025	Robert Pedersen	United States	2:25:49	Rozlyn Boutin	Canada	2:46:57	6614
July 27, 2024	Charlie Lawrence	United States	2:22:30	Jenna Wolfrum	United States	2:52:10	5770
July 23, 2023	Brice Daubord	France	2:26:17	Leandra Zimmermann	United States	2:45:59	4979
July 24, 2022	Simon Ricci	United States	2:31:42	Brooke Starn	United States	2:44:38	4080
September 19, 2021	Gregory Billington	United States	2:20:42	Judith Corachán Vaquera	Spain	2:55:33	3189
2020	cancelled due to coronavirus pandemic						
July 28, 2019	Gregory Billington	United States	2:25:25	Nina Zarina	Authorised Neutral Athletes	2:47:01	5226
July 29, 2018	Jorge Maravilla	United States	2:27:56	Bonnie Tran	United States	2:54:09	5242
July 23, 2017	Jorge Maravilla	United States	2:28:23	Devin McMahon	United States	2:52:49	6510
July 31, 2016	Max Haines-Stiles	United States	2:30:42	Tori Tyler	United States	2:49:51	6270
July 26, 2015	Chris Mocko	United States	2:26:22	Anna Bretan	United States	2:49:42	6026
July 27, 2014	August Brautigam	United States	2:32:17	Anna Bretan	United States	2:47:51	6580
June 16, 2013	Francois Lhuissier	France	2:25:15 CR	Anna Bretan	United States	2:42:26 CR	5827
July 29, 2012	Nathan Krah	United States	2:26:44	Devon Crosby-Helms	United States	2:44:02	6494
July 31, 2011	Michael Wardian	United States	2:27:06	Emily Field	United States	2:50:24	6020
July 25, 2010	Keith Bechtol	United States	2:23:28	Emily Hardin	United States	2:51:54	5992
July 26, 2009	Andrew Cook	United States	2:26:32	Yoko Shibui	Japan	2:46:34	5101
August 3, 2008	Chad Worthen	United States	2:31:52	Lauren Gustafson	United States	2:52:33	4,354 4,447
July 29, 2007	Andrew Cook	United States	2:25:57	Yolanda Flamino	United States	2:43:41	4,250 4,275
July 30, 2006	Andrew Cook	United States	2:26:46	Julia Stamps	United States	2:54:55	4,021 4,062
July 31, 2005	Tony Torres	United States	2:31:57	Sarah Hallas	United States	2:56:55	4,869 4,873 4,918
August 1, 2004	John Weru	Kenya	2:33:41	Susan Loken	United States	2:50:21	2,665
July 27, 2003	Patrick Kamau	Kenya	2:35:11	Lucy Carr	United States	3:02:00	1,891
July 28, 2002	Nate Bowen	United States	2:31:46	Magdalena Lewy	United States	2:50:11	1,920
July 8, 2001	Vytautas Ezerskis	Lithuania	2:30:53	Micha Lowe	United States	3:12:10	2,249
July 9, 2000	Michael Buchanan	United States	2:32:49	Lisa Murphy	United States	3:08:15	2,345
July 11, 1999	Brad Hawthorne	United States	2:24:36	Patti Smith	United States	3:09:44	
July 12, 1998	Hamid Oubadriss	France	2:23:54	Salina Chirchir	Kenya	2:45:36	
July 13, 1997	Hamid Miloudi	Algeria	2:26:49	Kristen Orre	United States	3:02:33	
July 14, 1996	Brad Lael	United States	2:37:27	Margee Brown	United States	2:57:45	
July 9, 1995	Hector Lopez	Mexico	2:23:38	Lisa Kelp	United States	2:51:12	
July 31, 1994	Patrick Muturi	Kenya	2:17:34	Karolina Szabo	Hungary	2:44:34	
July 18, 1993	Driss Dacha	Morocco	2:20:02	Tatiana Titova	Russia	2:40:32	
August 30, 1992	Sergio Jimenez	Mexico	2:16:44	Irina Bogachova	Kyrgyzstan	2:36:54	
June 23, 1991	Daniel Martinez	United States	2:15:31	Lesley Ann Lehane	United States	2:35:33	
July 1, 1990	Antonio Niemczak	Poland	2:13:48	Janis Klecker	United States	2:39:52	
July 9, 1989	Ernest Tjela	Lesotho	2:15:01	Stephanie Robertson	United States	3:09:08	
1988	not held						
July 19, 1987	Mehmet Terzi	Turkey	2:14:07	Eileen Claugus	United States	2:39:02	
July 20, 1986	Pete Pfitzinger	United States	2:13:29	Maria Trujillo	United States	2:37:58	
July 21, 1985	Ric Sayre	United States	2:15:07	Kersti Jakobsen	Denmark	2:38:04	
August 19, 1984	Simeon Kigen	Kenya	2:10:18	Katy Laetsch	United States	2:35:56	
July 24, 1983	Pete Pfitzinger	United States	2:14:45	Janis Klecker	United States	2:35:44	7,231
July 11, 1982	Miguel Tibaduiza	Colombia	2:14:32	Nancy Ditz	United States	2:44:05	
July 12, 1981	Harold Schulz	United States	2:15:17	Laurie Binder	United States	2:38:04	
July 13, 1980	Antonio Ramirez	United States	2:18:15	Joann Dahlkoetter	United States	2:43:20	
July 8, 1979	John Moreno	United States	2:18:54	Carol Young	United States	2:49:46	
July 9, 1978	Steven Palladino	United States	2:21:15	Sue Petersen	United States	2:50:15	
July 10, 1977	Athol Barton	New Zealand	2:24:59	Tena Harms	United States	2:53:20	

- CR = course record since the addition of the Golden Gate Bridge out and back

Countries Winners Represented
Country	Male	Female	Total
United States	26	36	62
Kenya	4	1	5
Mexico	2	0	2
Algeria	1	0	1
Colombia	1	0	1
Denmark	0	1	1
France	2	0	2
Hungary	0	1	1
Japan	0	1	1
Kyrgyzstan	0	1	1
Lesotho	1	0	1
Lithuania	1	0	1
Morocco	1	0	1
New Zealand	1	0	1
Poland	1	0	1
Turkey	1	0	1
Russia	0	1	1
Authorised Neutral Athletes	0	1	1

NOTE: Due to World Athletics policies, the 2019 win by Zarina is legally listed as an Authorised Neutral Athlete because of policies related to Doping in Russia.
