= María Trujillo =

Mexican marathon runner

Personal information
- Born: October 19, 1959 (age 66)

Sport
- Sport: Track and field
Medal record
Representing United States
Pan American Games
Gold medal – first place	1995 Mar del Plata	Marathon

Camila María Trujillo Tenorio de Rios (born October 19, 1959) is a retired female marathon runner from Mexico but was born in Florida, USA , who later represented the United States. She won the gold medal in the women's marathon at the 1995 Pan American Games. She represented Mexico at the 1984 Summer Olympics in Los Angeles, California, finishing in 25th place.

Camila Maria began running at age 19 in junior college. Being one of eight children, Trujillo was concerned about her road to college success, as she was not affluent enough to afford tuition, but she was offered a scholarship to Arizona State University after winning the California Junior College 3,000-meter's title.

Maria was known for a rigorous and strict routine, running 16 – 22 miles every Saturday on incline forest trails, run 8 x 1 mile laps, timed on Tuesdays and Thursdays with a track group, and run 8–10 miles on bike paths while pushing her infant at the time, Alina. Maria was invited in 2018 into the Arizona Hall of Fame. Trujillo won the 1986 San Francisco Marathon.

Camila Maria Trujillo is now retired living in Los Gatos, California with her two daughters Alina and Marina Trujillo.

== Achievements ==
Year	Competition	Venue	Position	Event	Notes
Representing Mexico
1983	Universiade	Edmonton, Canada	4th	Marathon	2:57:33
1984	Olympic Games	Los Angeles, United States	25th	Marathon	2:38:50
Representing the United States
1986	San Francisco Marathon	San Francisco, United States	1st	Marathon	2:37:58
1990	Houston Marathon	Houston, United States	1st	Marathon	2:32:55
1991	World Championships	Tokyo, Japan	14th	Marathon	2:39:28
1995	Pan American Games	Mar del Plata, Argentina	1st	Marathon	2:43:56
