= Laurie Binder =

American long-distance runner

- Born: August 10, 1947 (age 78)
- Occupation: Long-distance runner

Laurie Binder (born August 10, 1947) is an American long-distance runner. She was a four-time winner of the San Francisco Bay to Breakers race, tied with Maryetta Boitano for the most victories, setting the first course record when the race was shortened to 12 km at 41.24.7.

== Biography ==
She won the 1981 San Francisco Marathon, the year the race served as the national championship, making her the United States National Champion in the Marathon. Later in her 40s she was voted the "Masters Age Division Athlete of the Year" four consecutive times between 1988 and 1991 In 2014, she was elected into the USATF Masters Hall of Fame.

== Achievements ==
Year	Competition	Venue	Position	Event	Notes
Representing the United States
1981	San Francisco Marathon	San Francisco, United States	1st	Marathon	2:40:32
1982	Houston Marathon	Houston, United States	1st	Marathon	2:40:56

Sporting positions
Preceded by (United States) Joann Dahlkoetter	San Francisco Marathon - Women's Winner; 1981	Succeeded by (United States) Nancy Ditz
