= Janis Klecker =

American long-distance runner

Personal information
- Full name: Janis Kristin Klecker
- Nationality: American
- Born: Janis Kristin Horns; July 18, 1960 (age 65) Bloomington, Minnesota

Sport
- Country: USA
- Sport: Athletics
- Event: Marathon
- College team: University of Minnesota
- Club: Reebok Running Club

Achievements and titles
- Olympic finals: 1992, Marathon, 21st
- National finals: 1987, Marathon, 1st 1992, Marathon, 1st
- Personal bests: Mile: 4:51; 5,000 m: 15:57; 5 miles: 25:50; 10km: 31:44 (1990); 15km: 51:11 (1992); 20km: 1:08:24 (1989); 25km: 1:28:13 (1991); Half marathon: 1:10:41; Marathon: 2:30:12 (1992); 50 km: 3:13:51 NR (1983)

Janis Kristin Klecker (née Horns) (born July 18, 1960, in Bloomington, Minnesota) is a former American long-distance runner who is a two-time United States national champion in the marathon.

== Biography ==
Klecker was in the Alpha Phi sorority at the University of Minnesota.

Her husband, Barney Klecker is a two-time champion of the City of Lakes/Twin Cities Marathon.

Janis is the mother of six children, including Joe Klecker, who is a professional runner

As of 2009, Klecker is a dentist in Minnesota

== Racing career ==
Klecker won the 1992 US Olympic Trials marathon in Houston and went on to compete in the marathon at the 1992 Summer Olympics in Barcelona, an event in which she placed 21st. Klecker has won the City of Lakes Marathon/Twin Cities Marathon three times (1980, 1991, 1992), the San Francisco Marathon twice (1983, 1990), and the California International Marathon twice (1988, 1990).

Janis Klecker is an American record holders in the 50 K in 1983.

Klecker finished second to Nancy Ditz in the 1985 California International Marathon, but went on to win the event in 1988 and 1990. She set a course record at the 1990 CIM with a time of 2:30:42.

On Sept. 22, 1991, in Syracuse, New York, Klecker became the woman's U.S. National Champion in the 5K.

Klecker's PR in the marathon was 2:30:12 in Houston, Texas on January 26, 1992.

== Achievements ==
Year	Competition	Venue	Position	Event	Notes
Representing the United States
1981	Grandma's Marathon	Duluth, United States	2nd	Marathon	2:36:46.8
1983	San Francisco Marathon	San Francisco, United States	1st	Marathon	2:51:12
1987	Grandma's Marathon	Duluth, United States	1st	Marathon	2:36:12
1990	San Francisco Marathon	San Francisco, United States	1st	Marathon	2:39:52
1991	Twin Cities Marathon	Minneapolis, United States	1st	Marathon	2:30:31
1992	Houston Marathon	Houston, United States	1st	Marathon	2:30:12
1992	Twin Cities Marathon	Minneapolis, United States	1st	Marathon	2:36:50

Sporting positions
Preceded by Nancy Ditz	San Francisco Marathon – Women's Winner; 1983	Succeeded by Katy Schilly
Preceded by Patti Gray	California International Marathon – Women's Winner; 1988	Succeeded by Nan Doak-Davis
Preceded by Stephanie Robertson	San Francisco Marathon – Women's Winner; 1990	Succeeded by Lesley Ann Lehane
Preceded by Nan Doak-Davis	California International Marathon – Women's Winner; 1990	Succeeded by Sally Eastall
