= Norm Higgins =

American marathon runner (1936–2026)

Personal information
- Nationality: American
- Born: November 18, 1936 Quaker Hill, Connecticut, U.S.
- Died: April 21, 2026 (aged 89)

Sport
- Country: United States
- Sport: Sport of athletics
- Event: Marathon

Achievements and titles
- Personal best: Marathon: 2:15:52 (1971)

Norm Higgins (November 18, 1936 – April 21, 2026) was an American marathon runner, who won an edition of the New York City Marathon (1971). He also won a national championship at individual senior level (1966 in marathon).

Higgins died on April 21, 2026, at the age of 89.
