= Victor Dyrgall =

American long-distance runner

Personal information
- Born: October 8, 1917 New York, New York, United States
- Died: October 4, 2006 (aged 88) Fort Lee, New Jersey, United States

Sport
- Sport: Long-distance running
- Event: Marathon

Victor Dyrgall (October 8, 1917 – October 4, 2006) was an American long-distance runner. He competed in the marathon at the 1952 Summer Olympics.

Dyrgall competed for the Idaho Vandals track and field team in the NCAA.
