= James Crowley (athlete) =

American athlete and distance runner

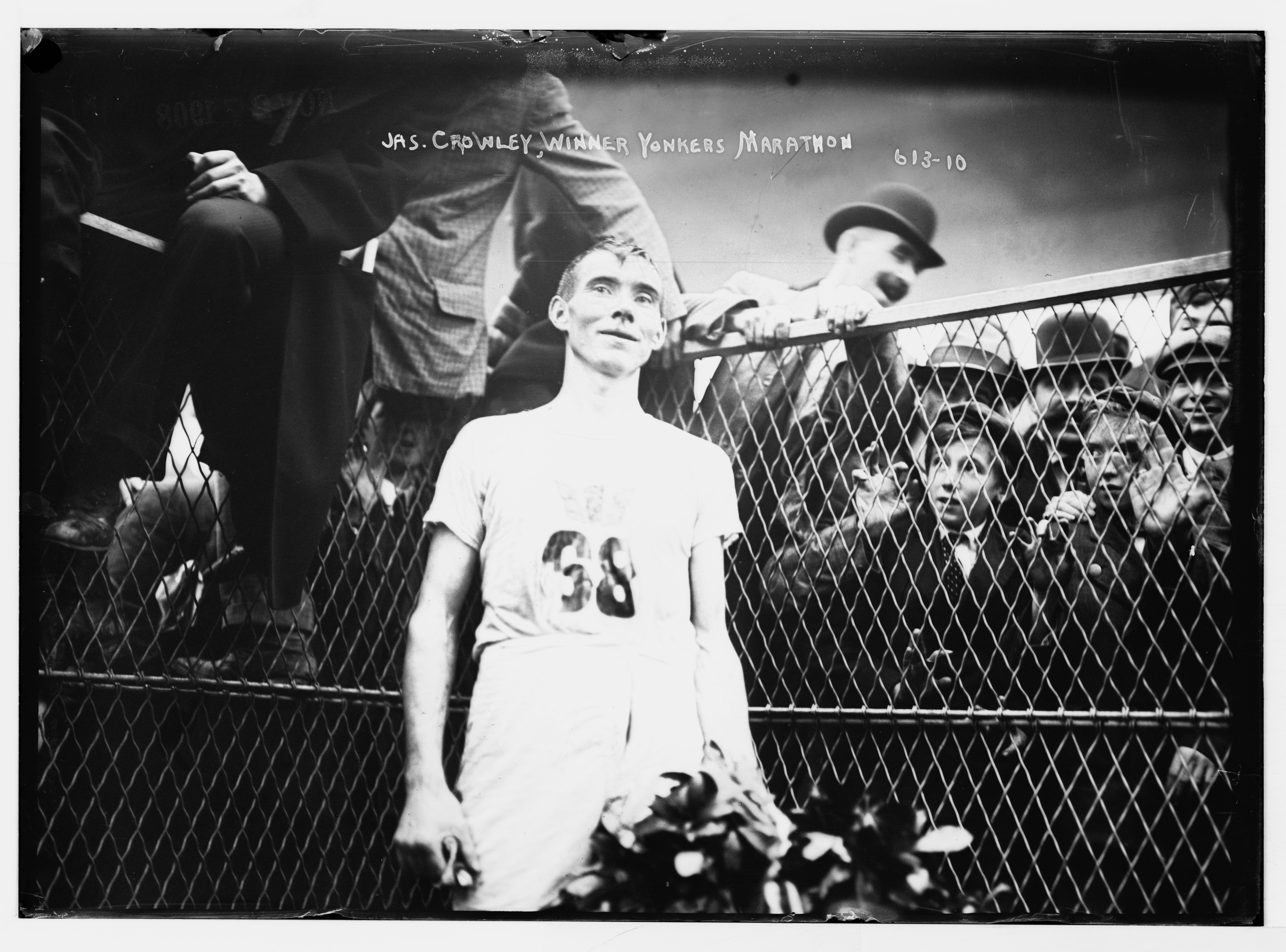

James F. "Jim" Crowley was an American athlete, distance runner, and a member of the Irish American Athletic Club. In 1910, he was known as "King of the Marathoners" for having competed in and won more marathons than any of the athletes of his day.

In 1908, Crowley won the third oldest marathon in the U.S., the Yonkers Marathon, held on Thanksgiving Day, sponsored by the Mercury Athletic Club of Yonkers, New York, "winning from a large and classy field in the excellent time of 2 hours 49 minutes 16.4 seconds." The New York Times wrote this about the race: "Before a crowd of nearly twenty thousand uproarious enthusiasts ... James F. Crowley of the Irish American Athletic Club, crossed the tape, a winner of the biggest and probably the most spectacular event of its kind ever held in America."

On December 26, 1908, he finished second to Matthew Maloney in the marathon from Rye to Columbus Circle, New York." Crowley again finished second to Maloney in an indoor marathon before 5,000 "wildly cheering" spectators held within the second Madison Square Garden on January 8, 1909 (3:00:26). Maloney was reported to have set a new indoor record for the event in a time of 2:54:45.4.

Approximately 110,000 spectators were reported to have turned up to see 180 runners compete in the New Jersey Athletic Club Marathon on May 15, 1909. With "scorching heat" noted to have affected many of the athletes, Crowley recorded a time of 3:07:16 and "won by a mile" over Harry Jensen of the Pastime Athletic Club.

On September 6, 1909, The New York Times reported "nearly every athlete of note in the Metropolitan Association of the Amateur Athletic Association" competed in the Irish American Athletic Club's Tailtin Games before 7,000 spectators at Celtic Park. Crowley won the two-mile steeplechase in a time of 11:12.

In 1909, Crowley held the following A.A.U indoor records:

- 16-Mile Run - 1:39:07
- 17-Mile Run - 1:46:07
- 20-Mile Run - 2:07:11
- 21-Mile Run - 2:14:35
- Indoor Marathon - 2:38:48

On November 14, 1910, at Celtic Park, Queens, New York, on the track of the Irish American Athletic Club, Crowley broke every A.A.U mile and half-mile record from 10½ miles to 17 miles (27 km).
