= Futsum Zienasellassie =

American long-distance runner

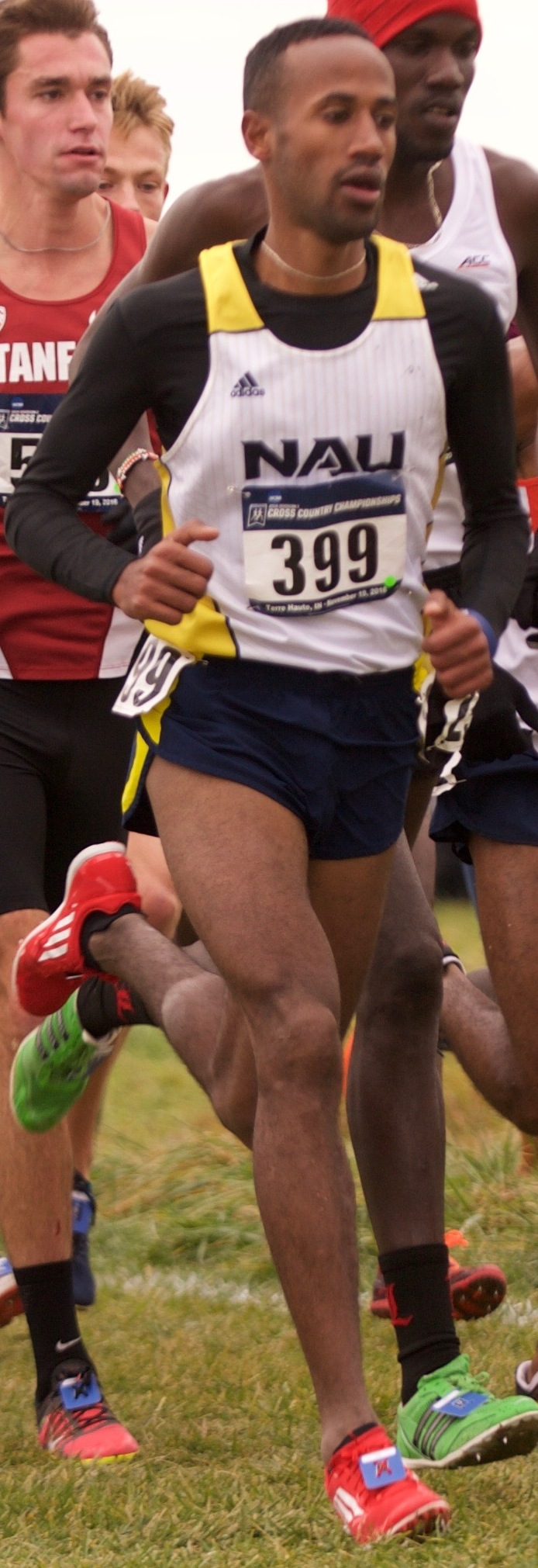
- Zienasellassie at the 2016 NCAA Division I Cross Country Championships

Personal information
- Nationality: American
- Born: 16 December 1992 (age 33) Ethiopia
- Home town: Indianapolis, Indiana
- Height: 178 cm (5 ft 10 in)

Sport
- Country: United States
- Sport: Long-distance running
- College team: Northern Arizona Lumberjacks
- Turned pro: 2016
Medal record
Representing Northern Arizona Lumberjacks Big Sky Conference
NCAA Cross Country Championships
Gold medal – first place	2016 Terre Haute	Team Gold
Bronze medal – third place	2014 Terre Haute	Team 4th
Bronze medal – third place	2014 Terre Haute	Individual 3rd
Silver medal – second place	2013 Terre Haute	Team Silver
Bronze medal – third place	2012 Louisville	Team 4th
NCAA Outdoor Track and Field Championships
Silver medal – second place	2016 Eugene	10,000 m 2nd

Futsum Zienasellassie (Ge'ez: ፉፁም ዜናሥላሴ; born 16 December 1992) is an Eritrean-American long-distance runner. After running for North Central High School in Indianapolis, Indiana, Zienasellassie ran for Northern Arizona University. He has competed professionally for the Hoka One One Northern Arizona Elite team since 2017.

== Early life ==
Futsum Zienasellassie was born in modern-day Eritrea (at the time a territory under Ethiopia) and was at a refugee camp in Ethiopia before moving to the United States at the age of 14. Zienasellassie's father is a priest in the Eritrean Orthodox Tewahedo Church. He has three brothers and four sisters. Zienasellassie was naturalized as a U.S. citizen in January 2016.

== Running career ==
=== High school ===
While attending North Central High School, Futsum Zienasellassie qualified for the Foot Locker Cross Country Championships three times, finishing 7th, 2nd, and 2nd. Zienasellassie also claimed the 2011 Nike Cross Nationals individual title in 15:02, outdistancing runner-up Daniel Vertiz by 24 seconds. He also won 7 IHSAA State titles in Cross Country and Track. As a senior, Zienasellassie claimed the Indiana cross country state record for 5000 Meters in 14:36 at the Flashrock Invitational on September 17, 2011, along with the Indiana State record at 3200 meters on the track in 8:47.75. During this time he was coached by both Byron Simpson And Rick Stover as the head coach.

=== Collegiate ===
Zienasellassie began attending Northern Arizona University in the fall of 2012. During his freshman cross country season he finished 31st at the NCAA Cross Country Championships with a time of 29:54.10. In 2013 Zienasellasie returned to the NCAA Cross Country Championships to finish 4th as a sophomore in 30:05.7 followed by a 3rd place showing as a junior in 30:25.3, and rounding out his cross country eligibility with a 4th place showing as a senior in 29:49.8. In 2015, Futsum Zienasellassie set two Eritrean indoor track records in the 5000 m and 800 meters. Futsum Zienasellassie is a 8-time NCAA Division I All-American, and 7-time Big Sky Conference champion.

Year	Competition	Position	Event	Time
Representing Northern Arizona Lumberjacks
2016	NCAA Division I Cross Country Championships	4th	10,000 m	29:49.8
2016	Big Sky Conference Cross Country Championships	1st	8000 m	23:58.3
2016	United States Olympic trials	21st	10,000 m	DNF
2016	NCAA Division I Outdoor Track and Field Championships	2nd	10,000 m	29:10.68
2016	Big Sky Conference Outdoor Track and Field Championships	1st	5000 m	14:46.57
2016	Big Sky Conference Outdoor Track and Field Championships	2nd	1500 m	3:50.58
2016	NCAA Division I Indoor Track and Field Championships	4th	5000 m	13:52.26
2016	Big Sky Conference Indoor Track and Field Championships	2nd	DMR	10:08.46
2016	Big Sky Conference Indoor Track and Field Championships	1st	Mile	4:13.92
2016	Big Sky Conference Indoor Track and Field Championships	1st	3000 m	8:31.07
2015	NCAA Division I Outdoor Track and Field Championships	12th	10,000 m	29:41.34
2015	NCAA Division I Outdoor Track and Field Championships	52nd	5000 m	14:31.90
2015	Big Sky Conference Outdoor Track and Field Championships	2nd	5000 m	14:20.93
2015	Big Sky Conference Outdoor Track and Field Championships	5th	1500 m	3:48.92
2015	Big Sky Conference Indoor Track and Field Championships	1st	5000 m	14:52.03
2015	Big Sky Conference Indoor Track and Field Championships	2nd	Mile	4:09.13
2015	Big Sky Conference Indoor Track and Field Championships	1st	3000 m	8:33.81
2014	NCAA Division I Cross Country Championships	3rd	10,000 m	30:25.3
2014	Big Sky Conference Cross Country Championships	1st	8000 m	24:07.8
2014	Big Sky Conference Indoor Track and Field Championships	9th	5000 m	15:03.64
2014	Big Sky Conference Indoor Track and Field Championships	11th	Mile	4:23.32
2013	NCAA Division I Cross Country Championships	4th	10,000 m	30:05.7
2013	NCAA Division I Outdoor Track and Field Championships	13th	5000 m	14:07.72
2013	Big Sky Conference Outdoor Track and Field Championships	2nd	5000 m	14:26.73
2013	Big Sky Conference Outdoor Track and Field Championships	2nd	1500 m	3:48.50
2012	NCAA Division I Cross Country Championships	31st	10,000 m	29:54.1
2012	Big Sky Conference Cross Country Championships	3rd	8000 m	24:56.7

=== Post Collegiate/Professional ===
Futsum Zienasellassie was sponsored by COROS and trained with McKirdy Trained in Flagstaff, Arizona, from 2017 to 2022.
At the 2017 USATF championship Medtronic TC 10 Mile, Zienasellassie was 10th USATF 10 Mile Championships/Medtronic TC 10 Mile and runner-up at the Monterey Bay Half Marathon.
At the 2018 USATF championship Medtronic TC 10 Mile, Zienasellassie placed 8th in 47:28.
On October 6, 2019, Zienasellasie won the Medtronic TC 10 Mile and became the USATF 10 Mile National Champion in a time of 46:55.
On 19 January 2020, Zienasellassie ran 1:01:44 and placed 14th at the Aramco Houston Half Marathon in Houston, Texas.
On 7 March 2020, Zienasellassie ran 45:38 and placed 11th at the USATF 15 km Road Running Championships in Jacksonville, Florida.
On 7 May 2022, Zienasellassie ran 1:02:36 and placed 2nd at the USATF Half-Marathon Championships in Indianapolis, Indiana.
On 4 December 2022, Zienasellasie won the 2022 USATF Marathon Championships at California International Marathon in 2:11:01.

On 16 April 2023, Zienasellassie ran 2:09:40 in the Rotterdam Marathon finishing 11th overall and becoming the 25th American to break 2:10 in the Marathon.

== Personal bests ==
Zienasellassie's personal bests are:

- 1,500m - 3:45.04 (2014)
- 3,000m – 7:53.76 (2016)
- 5,000m – 13:34.84 (2017)
- 10,000m – 27:52.70 (2016)
- 10k - 28:55 (2022)
- 15k - 43:27 (2022)
- 10 mile - 46:53 (2022)
- Half Marathon - 1:01:21 (2021)
- 25k - 1:14:28 (2021)
- Marathon: 2:09:29 (2025)
