= Gérard Côté =

Canadian marathon runner (1913–1993)

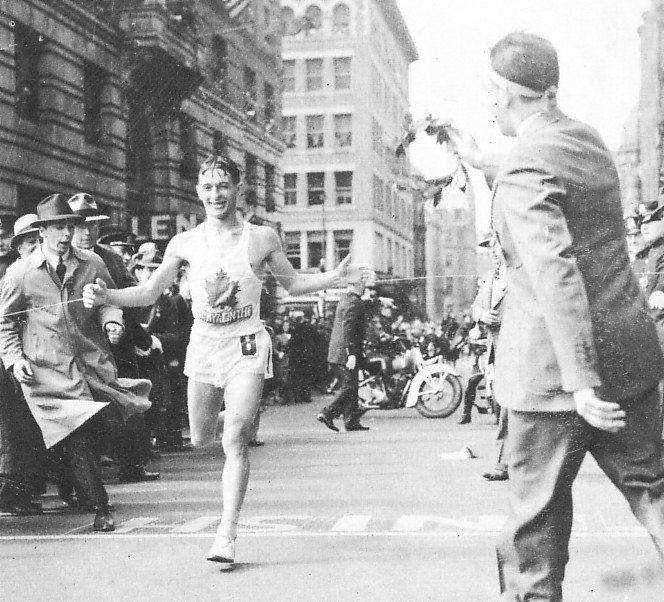
- Gérard Côté, winner of the 1940 Boston Marathon

Personal information
- Full name: Gérard Côté
- Born: July 26, 1913 St-Barnabé-Sud, Quebec, Canada
- Died: June 12, 1993 (aged 79). St-Hyacinthe, Quebec, Canada

Sport
- Country: Canada
- Sport: Running
- Event: Marathon
- Retired: 1956

Achievements and titles
- Olympic finals: 17th-place finish in the 1948 Summer Olympics
- World finals: Member of Canadian teams: 1950 British Empire Games; 1954 British Empire Games; 1954 Commonwealth Games
- Highest world ranking: Four-time winner of the Boston Marathon
- Personal best: Winner of the 1943 Boston Marathon in 2:28:25

Gérard Côté, CM CQ (July 26, 1913 – 12 June 1993) was a Canadian marathon runner and a four-time winner of the Boston Marathon.

Born in Saint-Barnabé-Sud, Quebec, Côté was training to be a boxer when he switched to running marathons. He competed in his first Boston Marathon in 1936 and won the race in 1940, 1943, 1944, and 1948. He set a new course record with his 1940 victory, and was awarded the Lou Marsh Trophy as Canada's top athlete of the year. Côté was the first francophone recipient of the award.

Côté was also a three-time winner of the Yonkers Marathon and won three U.S. Amateur Athletic Union marathon championships. In 264 races over his career, Côté won 112 with 56 second-place finishes. He competed at the 1948 Summer Olympics but leg cramps held him to a 17th-place finish. He was a member of the Canadian teams at the 1950 British Empire Games and the 1954 British Empire and Commonwealth Games. Côté retired from running in 1956.

Côté has been inducted into the Canadian Olympic Hall of Fame (1955) and Canada's Sports Hall of Fame (1956). In 1989, he was made a Knight of the National Order of Quebec and in 1990, he was made a Member of the Order of Canada. Côté died in Saint-Hyacinthe, Quebec at age 79.

== See also ==
- List of winners of the Boston Marathon
