= Johnny Kelley =

American long-distance runner

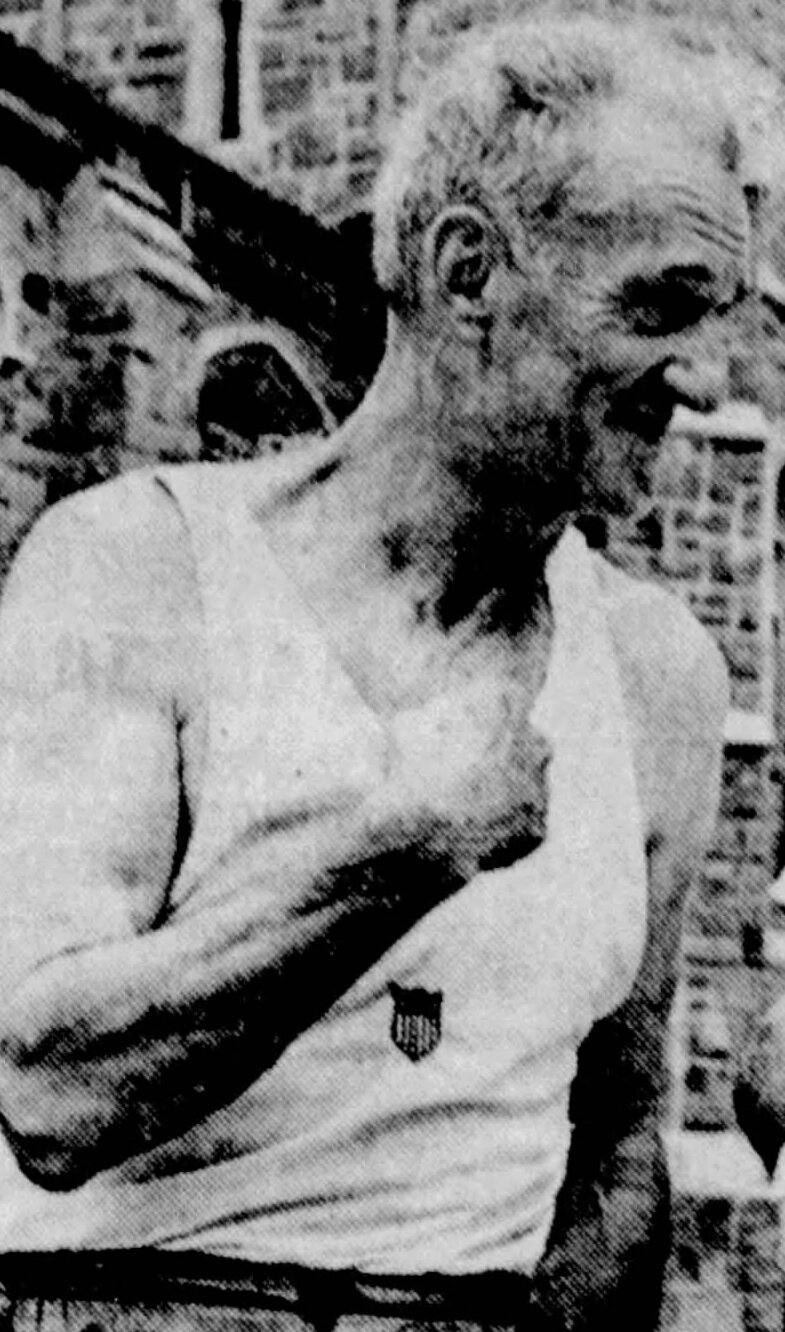
- Kelley in 1969
- Born: John Adelbert Kelley; September 6, 1907; Medford, Massachusetts, U.S.
- Died: October 6, 2004 (aged 97); South Yarmouth, Massachusetts, U.S.
- Other name: Kelley the Elder
- Known for: Boston Marathon two-time winner and longtime competitor

John Adelbert Kelley (September 6, 1907 – October 6, 2004) was an American long-distance runner who twice represented his native country at the Summer Olympics, in 1936 and 1948, and competed in the Boston Marathon over 50 times, winning in 1935 and 1945. He was often dubbed "Kelley the Elder" to avoid confusion with John J. Kelley (1930–2011; "Kelley the Younger"), winner of the 1957 Boston Marathon; the two men were not related.

== Biography ==
Born in West Medford, Massachusetts, as one of ten children, Kelley ran track and cross-country at Arlington High School in Massachusetts. He did not finish his first Boston Marathon in 1928, but eventually competed in a record 61 Boston Marathons.

Regarded as a legend of the marathon, Kelley won the 1935 and 1945 runnings of the Boston Marathon. He finished in second place at Boston a record seven times. Between 1934 and 1950, he finished in the top five 15 times at Boston, consistently running in the 2:30s. Kelley also ran the Yonkers Marathon 29 times.

In 1936, Kelley overtook Ellison "Tarzan" Brown near Heartbreak Hill, (Note: Heartbreak Hill is a portion of the Boston Marathon course which ascends over 0.4 miles (640 m) between the 20-and-21-mile (32 and 34 km) marks, near Boston College. It is the last of four "Newton hills", which begin at the 16-mile (26 km) mark.) giving him a consolatory pat on the shoulder as he passed. This gesture renewed the competitive drive in Brown, who rallied, pulled ahead of Kelley, and went on to win—thereby, it was said, breaking Kelley's heart.

A member of the U.S. Olympic Team at the 1936 Summer Olympics in Berlin, Kelley finished 18th in the marathon. He again competed for the U.S. in the 1948 Summer Olympics in London.

At age 70, Kelley was still running 50 miles (80 km) a week and around 15 races a year. He ran his 50th Boston Marathon in 1981; the event was also his 108th career marathon. Kelley ran his last full marathon at Boston in 1992 at the age of 84, his 61st start and 58th finish there. For two more years, he ran the last 7 miles (11 km).

In 1993, a commemorative statue of Kelley was erected near the City Hall of Newton, Massachusetts, on the Boston Marathon course, one hill and about 1 mile (1.6 km) prior to the foot of Heartbreak Hill. (Note: The Boston Globe erroneously refers to the statue's location as the foot of Heartbreak Hill. The statue's site, at Commonwealth Avenue and Walnut Street, near Newton City Hall, is at mile 19.2 on the course, while the foot of Heartbreak Hill is at or near 20.4 miles.)

Kelley was named "Runner of the Century" by Runner's World magazine in 2000. He enjoyed painting and worked in natural landscapes, producing about 20 paintings a year. One commissioned work is The Boston Dream, a Primitive School painting showing the marathon course, with Hopkinton and Boston rising from the distance, as two winter runners—a woman and a man—train for their "Boston dream".

Kelley died in 2004 at age 97; he is buried in Quivet Neck Cemetery in East Dennis, Massachusetts.

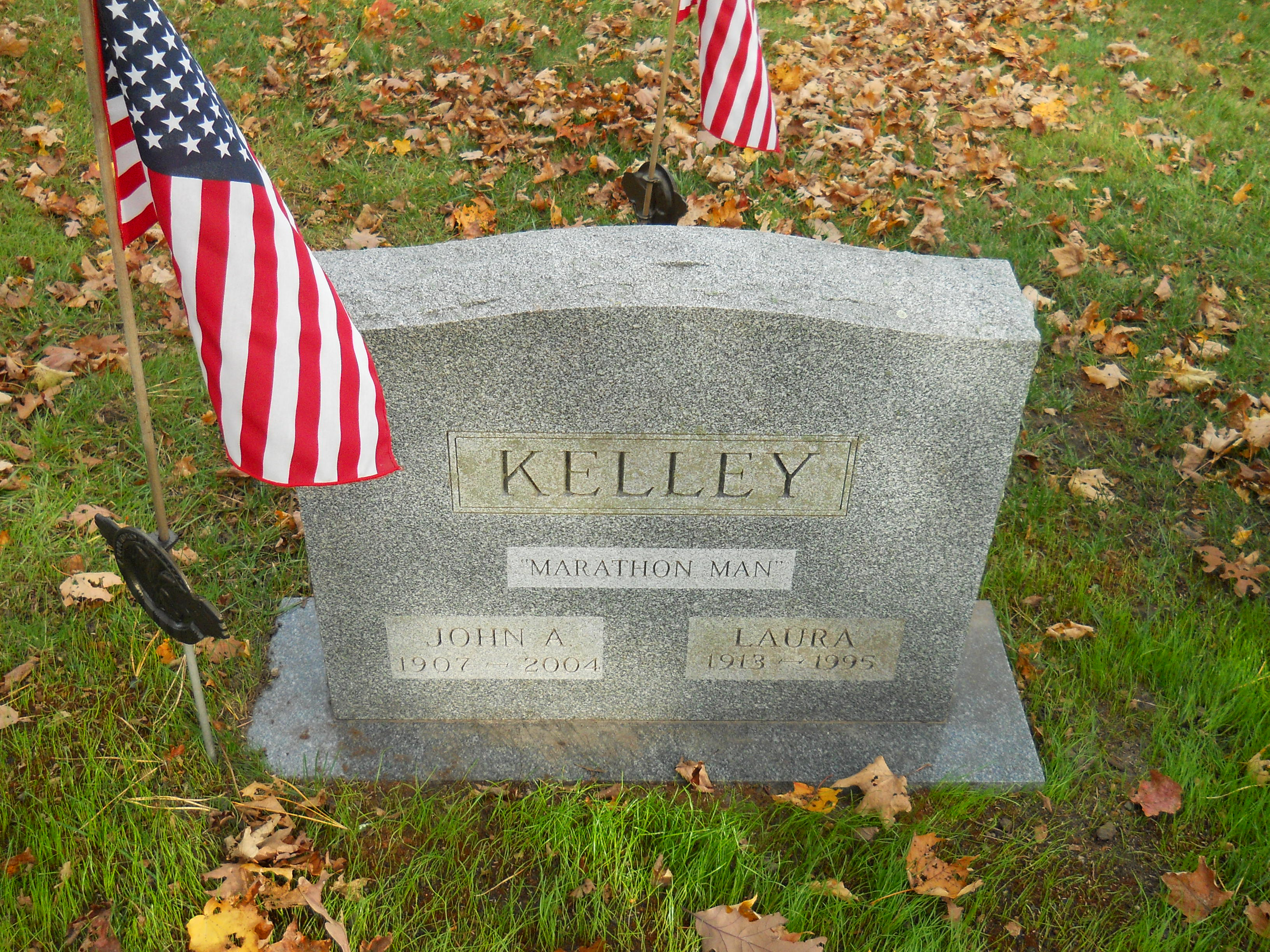
Kelley's headstone, marked "Marathon Man"

=== Quotes ===
"For me, the race these days is to try to beat the girls to the finish and to wave to all my old friends along the course."

— Kelley at age 65

"I'm afraid to stop running. I feel too good. I want to stay alive."

— Kelley at age 70

== See also ==
- List of winners of the Boston Marathon
- Les Pawson
