= Liberty Bell Classic – Results =

These are the results of the Liberty Bell Classic, an alternative to the 1980 Summer Olympics for the boycotting countries. It took place on July 16 and July 17, 1980, in Philadelphia, United States at the Franklin Field.

== Men's results ==
=== 100 meters ===
Heats – July 16
Wind: Heat 1: +0.6 m/s, Heat 4: +1.6 m/s

Rank	Heat	Name	Nationality	Time	Notes
1	1	Harvey Glance	United States	10.27	
2		Mel Lattany	United States	10.39	
3		Willie Gault	United States	10.46	
4	4	Tony Sharpe	Canada	10.46	
5		Desai Williams	Canada	10.49	
6		Neville Hodge	United States Virgin Islands	10.51	
7		Marvin Nash	Canada	10.60	
8		Bernd Sattler	West Germany	10.62	
9		Robert Clarke	Barbados	10.74	

Final – July 17
Wind: +0.9 m/s

Rank	Name	Nationality	Time	Notes
1st place, gold medalist(s)	Mel Lattany	United States	10.31	
2nd place, silver medalist(s)	Harvey Glance	United States	10.31	
3rd place, bronze medalist(s)	Willie Gault	United States	10.33	
4	Desai Williams	Canada	10.37	
5	Tony Sharpe	Canada	10.57	
6	Marvin Nash	Canada	10.58	
7	Bernd Sattler	West Germany	10.66	
8	Neville Hodge	United States Virgin Islands	10.79	
9	Robert Clarke	Barbados	10.91	

=== 200 meters ===
Heats – July 16

Rank	Name	Nationality	Time	Notes
1	Desai Williams	Canada	20.81	
2	Fred Taylor	United States	20.81	
3	Bernd Sattler	West Germany	21.14	
4	James Butler	United States	21.16	
5	Neville Hodge	United States Virgin Islands	21.17	
6	Tony Sharpe	Canada	21.23	
7	Frank Van Doorn	Canada	21.31	
8	Fabian Whymns	Bahamas	21.44	
9	John Mwebi	Kenya	22.53	

Final – July 17

Rank	Name	Nationality	Time	Notes
1st place, gold medalist(s)	James Butler	United States	20.65	
2nd place, silver medalist(s)	Fred Taylor	United States	20.66	
3rd place, bronze medalist(s)	Desai Williams	Canada	20.92	
4	Bernd Sattler	West Germany	21.15	
5	Neville Hodge	United States Virgin Islands	21.33	
6	Frank Van Doorn	Canada	21.38	
7	Tony Sharpe	Canada	21.41	
8	Fabian Whymns	Bahamas	21.86	
	John Mwebi	Kenya	??.??	

=== 400 meters ===
Heats – July 16

Rank	Name	Nationality	Time	Notes
1	Herman Frazier	United States	46.49	
2	Walter McKoy	United States	46.58	
3	James Atuti	Kenya	46.76	
4	Billy Konchellah	Kenya	46.91	
5	Hassan El Kashief	Sudan	47.11	
6	Fred Sowerby	Antigua and Barbuda	47.13	
7	Bill Green	United States	47.32	
8	Brian Saunders	Canada	47.68	
9	Hamil Grimes	Barbados	47.74	

Final – July 17

Rank	Name	Nationality	Time	Notes
1st place, gold medalist(s)	Billy Konchellah	Kenya	45.59	
2nd place, silver medalist(s)	Hassan El Kashief	Sudan	45.60	
3rd place, bronze medalist(s)	Bill Green	United States	45.79	
4	Walter McKoy	United States	45.80	
5	Herman Frazier	United States	45.81	
6	James Atuti	Kenya	46.33	
7	Fred Sowerby	Antigua and Barbuda	46.62	
8	Brian Saunders	Canada	46.92	
9	Hamil Grimes	Barbados	48.66	

=== 800 meters ===
Rank	Name	Nationality	Time	Notes
1st place, gold medalist(s)	Don Paige	United States	1:47.19	
2nd place, silver medalist(s)	Omer Khalifa	Sudan	1:47.27	
3rd place, bronze medalist(s)	Randy Wilson	United States	1:48.03	
4	Mike Watson	Bermuda	1:48.41	
5	James Maina Boi	Kenya	1:48.50	
6	Peter Lemashon	Kenya	1:49.26	
7	Ali Figio Oshia	Sudan	1:49.50	
8	Christian Molina	Chile	1:50.50	
9	Pin Kal-Kat	Thailand	1:51.06	
	Felipe Mascaró	Chile	?:??.??	

=== 1500 meters ===
Rank	Name	Nationality	Time	Notes
1st place, gold medalist(s)	Steve Scott	United States	3:40.19	
2nd place, silver medalist(s)	Omer Khalifa	Sudan	3:40.34	
3rd place, bronze medalist(s)	Mike Durkin	United States	3:41.40	
4	Wilson Waigwa	Kenya	3:41.60	
5	John Gregorek	United States	3:41.82	
6	Justin Gloden	Luxembourg	3:43.43	
7	Sermet Timurlenk	Turkey	3:44.46	
8	Craig Masback	United States	3:47.04	
9	Emilio Ulloa	Chile	3:51.67	
10	Luis Palma	Chile	3:54.99	
11	Louis Meleboko	Central African Republic	4:07.45	

=== 5000 meters ===
Rank	Name	Nationality	Time	Notes
1st place, gold medalist(s)	Kip Rono	Kenya	13:37.52	
2nd place, silver medalist(s)	Hillary Tuwei	Kenya	13:39.72	
3rd place, bronze medalist(s)	Greg Duhaime	Canada	13:45.77	
4	Matt Centrowitz	United States	13:46.43	
5	Alberto Salazar	United States	13:46.52	
6	Dick Buerkle	United States	13:51.37	
7	Rod Dixon	New Zealand	14:04.17	
8	Alfred Nyasani	Kenya	14:13.77	
9	Greg Fredericks	United States	14:31.14	
10	Ahmet Altun	Turkey	14:39.06	
11	Kangni Folivi	Togo	14:51.73	
12	Sam Hlawe	Swaziland	14:56.90	
13	John Kimatin	Kenya	15:05.99	
14	Isaac Slhiohgonyane	Swaziland	15:29.65	
	Nzimbu	Zaire	??:??.??	

=== 110 meters hurdles ===
17 July
Wind: +2.7 m/s

Rank	Name	Nationality	Time	Notes
1st place, gold medalist(s)	Renaldo Nehemiah	United States	13.31	
2nd place, silver medalist(s)	Tonie Campbell	United States	13.68	
3rd place, bronze medalist(s)	Hans-Gerd Klein	West Germany	13.94	
4	Phillip Sang	Kenya	14.10	
5	Pat Fogarty	Canada	14.11	
6	Dieter Gebhard	West Germany	14.24	
7	Fatwell Kimaiyo	Kenya	14.35	
8	Mark McKoy	Canada	14.42	

=== 400 meters hurdles ===
17 July

Rank	Name	Nationality	Time	Notes
1st place, gold medalist(s)	James Walker	United States	48.6	
2nd place, silver medalist(s)	David Lee	United States	49.1	
3rd place, bronze medalist(s)	Bart Williams	United States	50.0	
4	Daniel Kimaiyo	Kenya	50.6	
5	Lloyd Guss	Canada	51.2	
6	Giorgio Ballati	Italy	51.3	

=== 4 × 100 metres relay ===
Rank	Nation	Competitors	Time	Notes
1st place, gold medalist(s)	United States	Mel Lattany, Harvey Glance, James Butler, Carl Lewis	38.61	
2nd place, silver medalist(s)	Canada	Tony Sharpe, Desai Williams, Marvin Nash, Ben Johnson	39.54	
3rd place, bronze medalist(s)	Thailand		41.29	
4	Barbados		41.62	
5	Gambia		42.50	
6	Central African Republic		43.68	

=== 4 × 400 metres relay ===
Rank	Nation	Competitors	Time	Notes
1st place, gold medalist(s)	United States	Walter McCoy, Fred Taylor, David Lee, Herman Frazier	3:03.20	
2nd place, silver medalist(s)	Kenya	James Atuti, Billy Konchellah, James Maina Boi, Daniel Kimaiyo	3:05.72	
3rd place, bronze medalist(s)	Sudan		3:09.06	
4	Canada		3:09.17	

=== High jump ===
July 17

Rank	Name	Nationality	Result	Notes
1st place, gold medalist(s)	Benn Fields	United States	2.26	
2nd place, silver medalist(s)	Nat Page	United States	2.26	
3rd place, bronze medalist(s)	Dietmar Mögenburg	West Germany	2.22	
3rd place, bronze medalist(s)	Carlo Thränhardt	West Germany	2.22	

=== Pole vault ===
Rank	Name	Nationality	Result	Notes
1st place, gold medalist(s)	Tom Hintnaus	United States	5.50	
2nd place, silver medalist(s)	Steve Lawry	Israel	5.33	
3rd place, bronze medalist(s)	Zhang Cheng	China	5.18	
4	Liang Weiqiang	China	5.02	
5	Bruce Simpson	Canada	5.02	
5	Brian Morrisette	United States Virgin Islands	5.02	
	Glenn Colivas	Canada	NM	

=== Long jump ===
July 17

Rank	Name	Nationality	Result	Notes
1st place, gold medalist(s)	Larry Myricks	United States	8.20	
2nd place, silver medalist(s)	Larry Doubley	United States	7.95	
3rd place, bronze medalist(s)	Carl Lewis	United States	7.77	

=== Triple jump ===
July 17

Rank	Name	Nationality	Result	Notes
1st place, gold medalist(s)	Zhou Zhenxian	China	16.90	
2nd place, silver medalist(s)	Greg Caldwell	United States	16.75	
3rd place, bronze medalist(s)	Steve Hanna	Bahamas	16.42	

=== Shot put ===
Rank	Name	Nationality	Result	Notes
1st place, gold medalist(s)	Youssef Nagui Asaad	Egypt	19.69	
2nd place, silver medalist(s)	Ian Pyka	United States	19.58	
3rd place, bronze medalist(s)	Gert Weil	Chile	16.17	

=== Discus throw ===
Rank	Name	Nationality	Result	Notes
1st place, gold medalist(s)	Ben Plucknett	United States	61.46	
2nd place, silver medalist(s)	Al Oerter	United States	60.76	
3rd place, bronze medalist(s)	Alwin Wagner	West Germany	59.48	
4	Borys Chambul	Canada	59.13	
5	Bradley Cooper	Bahamas	58.32	
6	Heinz-Direck Neu	West Germany	57.12	
7	Rob Gray	Canada	54.15	
8	John Onkware	Kenya	42.37	

=== Hammer throw ===
Rank	Name	Nationality	Result	Notes
1st place, gold medalist(s)	Scott Neilson	Canada	72.62	
2nd place, silver medalist(s)	Boris Djerassi	United States	71.34	
3rd place, bronze medalist(s)	Andy Bessette	United States	69.08	
4	John McArdle	United States	68.15	
5	Peter Galle	Israel	61.11	
6	Uğur Sel	Turkey	55.09	

=== Javelin throw ===
Rank	Name	Nationality	Result	Notes
1st place, gold medalist(s)	Shen Maomao	China	89.12	AR
2nd place, silver medalist(s)	Tom Petranoff	United States	84.56	
3rd place, bronze medalist(s)	Gheorghe Megelea	Canada	79.24	
4	Robert Sing	United States	76.10	
5	Robert Moulder	Canada	68.45	
6	Atchontchon Agbodan	Togo	61.37	

=== Decathlon ===
July 17/18

The highest mark recorded in each event is highlighted in yellow

Rank	Athlete	Nationality	100m	LJ	SP	HJ	400m	110m H	DT	PV	JT	1500m	Points	Notes
1st place, gold medalist(s)	Bobby Coffman	United States	11.05	7.10	15.72	1.98	49.5	14.10	51.87	4.61	49.66	4:46.69	8058	
2nd place, silver medalist(s)	Lee Palles	United States	10.96	7.50	14.01	2.13	49.2	15.23	41.78	4.50	55.93	4:35.77	8009	
3rd place, bronze medalist(s)	Weng Kangqiang	China	11.56	6.93	12.45	1.92	52.9	17.05	35.71	4.50	66.93	4:56.90	7015	
4	Jens Schulze	West Germany	10.81	6.92	14.33	1.98	48.1	14.90	39.24	NM	50.67	4:28.79	6904	
5	Zhu Quilin	China	11.93	6.87	12.88	1.92	57.8	16.50	40.16	4.20	50.65	5:20.62	6533	
	Guido Kratschmer	West Germany	10.91	7.24	15.70	1.89	49.7	14.49	NM	DNS	–	–	DNF	
	Conrad Mainwaring	Antigua and Barbuda	11.97	?.??	8.81	1.70	52.6	DNS	–	–	–	–	DNF	
	Jürgen Hingsen	West Germany	11.30	7.38	14.26	DNS	–	–	–	–	–	–	DNF	
	Wolfgang Muders	West Germany	11.42	NM	12.56	DNS	–	–	–	–	–	–	DNF	

== Women's results ==
=== 100 meters ===
Heats – July 16

Rank	Name	Nationality	Time	Notes
1	Jeanette Bolden	United States	11.59	
2	Chandra Cheeseborough	United States	11.61	
3	Karen Hawkins	United States	11.66	
4	Angela Bailey	Canada	11.76	
5	Diane Williams	United States	11.83	
6	Heidi-Elke Gaugel	West Germany	11.86	
7	Marita Payne	Canada	12.01	
8	Usanee Lopinkarn	Thailand	12.10	
9	Elke Vollmer	West Germany	12.17	

Final – July 17

Rank	Name	Nationality	Time	Notes
1st place, gold medalist(s)	Chandra Cheeseborough	United States	11.27	
2nd place, silver medalist(s)	Jeanette Bolden	United States	11.41	
3rd place, bronze medalist(s)	Karen Hawkins	United States	11.43	
4	Angela Bailey	Canada	11.44	
5	Diane Williams	United States	11.54	
6	Heidi-Elke Gaugel	West Germany	11.60	
7	Marita Payne	Canada	11.70	
8	Usanee Lopinkarn	Thailand	11.87	
9	Elke Vollmer	West Germany	11.92	

=== 200 meters ===
Heats – July 16

Rank	Name	Nationality	Time	Notes
1	Chandra Cheeseborough	United States	23.21	
2	Karen Hawkins	United States	23.52	
3	Angella Taylor	Canada	23.56	
4	Angela Bailey	Canada	23.83	
5	Marita Payne	Canada	23.90	
6	Alexis Paul MacDonald	Canada	24.47	
7	Oralee Fowler	Bahamas	24.49	
8	Ruperta Charles	Antigua and Barbuda	24.69	
9	Usanee Lopinkarn	Thailand	24.84	

Final – July 17

Rank	Name	Nationality	Time	Notes
1st place, gold medalist(s)	Angella Taylor	Canada	22.77	
2nd place, silver medalist(s)	Chandra Cheeseborough	United States	22.84	
3rd place, bronze medalist(s)	Karen Hawkins	United States	23.41	
4	Marita Payne	Canada	23.66	
5	Angela Bailey	Canada	23.70	
6	Alexis Paul MacDonald	Canada	24.51	
7	Ruperta Charles	Antigua and Barbuda	25.18	

=== 400 meters ===
Rank	Name	Nationality	Time	Notes
1st place, gold medalist(s)	Gwen Gardner	United States	52.04	
2nd place, silver medalist(s)	Charmaine Crooks	Canada	52.33	
3rd place, bronze medalist(s)	Roberta Belle	United States	52.34	
4	Ruth Waithera	Kenya	52.70	
5	Kim Thomas	United States	53.70	
6	Molly Killingbeck	Canada	53.79	
7	Oralee Fowler	Bahamas	54.70	
8	Freida Nichols	Barbados	57.06	
9	Amegnidou Akoua	Togo	1:01.55	

=== 800 meters ===
Rank	Name	Nationality	Time	Notes
1st place, gold medalist(s)	Yvonne Mondesire	Canada	2:02.34	
2nd place, silver medalist(s)	Robin Campbell	United States	2:02.53	
3rd place, bronze medalist(s)	Ann Mackie-Morelli	Canada	2:02.63	
4	Mary Chemweno	Kenya	2:04.96	
5	Debbie Campbell	Canada	2:06.50	
6	Delisa Walton	United States	2:07.56	
7	Rose Tata-Muya	Kenya	2:07.66	
8	Alejandra Ramos	Chile	2:10.12	
	Daliwa Weleba	Togo	?:??.??	

=== 1500 meters ===
Rank	Name	Nationality	Time	Notes
1st place, gold medalist(s)	Mary Decker	United States	4:00.87	
2nd place, silver medalist(s)	Julie Brown	United States	4:10.37	
3rd place, bronze medalist(s)	Francie Larrieu	United States	4:10.39	
4	Rose Thomsen	Kenya	4:18.23	
5	Mary Purcell	Ireland	4:18.30	
6	Elizabeth Onyambu	Kenya	4:24.94	
7	Eunice Kae	Kenya	4:27.18	
8	Nesi Gettin	Turkey	4:36.39	
9	Agbonato Adjoa	Togo	5:14.97	

=== 100 meters hurdles ===
Rank	Name	Nationality	Time	Notes
1st place, gold medalist(s)	Stephanie Hightower	United States	13.08	
2nd place, silver medalist(s)	Benita Fitzgerald	United States	13.17	
3rd place, bronze medalist(s)	Esther Rot	Israel	13.20	
4	Candy Young	United States	13.57	
5	Sharon Lane	Canada	13.61	
6	Cecilia Branch	Canada	13.88	
7	Ayşe İşkol	Turkey	14.30	
	Dai Jianhua	China	??.??	

=== 4 × 100 metres relay ===
Rank	Nation	Competitors	Time	Notes
1st place, gold medalist(s)	United States	Chandra Cheeseborough, Karen Hawkins, Kathy McMillan, Jeanette Bolden	44.57	
2nd place, silver medalist(s)	West Germany		45.26	
3rd place, bronze medalist(s)	Thailand		46.90	

=== 4 × 400 metres relay ===
Rank	Nation	Competitors	Time	Notes
1st place, gold medalist(s)	United States	Kim Thomas, Delisa Walton, Robin Campbell, Roberta Belle	3:32.69	
2nd place, silver medalist(s)	Canada		3:33.50	

=== High jump ===
Rank	Name	Nationality	Result	Notes
1st place, gold medalist(s)	Zheng Dazhen	China	1.92	
2nd place, silver medalist(s)	Brigitte Reid	Canada	1.84	
3rd place, bronze medalist(s)	Paula Girven	United States	1.80	
4	Ge Ping	China	1.79	
	Wanipa Sangsavang	Thailand	NM	

=== Long jump ===
Rank	Name	Nationality	Result	Notes
1st place, gold medalist(s)	Kathy McMillan	United States	6.65	
2nd place, silver medalist(s)	Carol Lewis	United States	6.60	
3rd place, bronze medalist(s)	Shonel Ferguson	Bahamas	6.48	
4	Heike Schmidt	West Germany	6.47	
5	Anke Weigt	West Germany	6.45	
6	Karin Hänel	West Germany	6.37	
7	Jill Ross	Canada	6.07	
8	Diane Konihowski	Canada	6.06	
9	Wu Feng	China	6.06	
10	Esther Otieno	Kenya	5.67	
11	Ruperta Charles	Antigua and Barbuda	5.52	
12	Ayşe İşkol	Turkey	5.15	

=== Shot put ===
Rank	Name	Nationality	Result	Notes
1st place, gold medalist(s)	Shen Lijuan	China	17.09	
2nd place, silver medalist(s)	Ann Turbyne	United States	16.24	
3rd place, bronze medalist(s)	Lu Cheng	China	15.98	
4	Diane Konihowski	Canada	15.82	
5	Lorna Griffin	United States	14.66	
6	Karen Page	New Zealand	12.31	

=== Discus throw ===
Rank	Name	Nationality	Result	Notes
1st place, gold medalist(s)	Xie Jianhua	China	56.56	
2nd place, silver medalist(s)	Lucette Moreau	Canada	55.20	
3rd place, bronze medalist(s)	Lorna Griffin	United States	53.52	
4	Zhu Junfang	China	52.27	
5	Lynne Winbigler-Anderson	United States	52.15	

=== Javelin throw ===
Rank	Name	Nationality	Result	Notes
1st place, gold medalist(s)	Laurie Kern	Canada	57.42	
2nd place, silver medalist(s)	Tang Guoli	China	55.30	
3rd place, bronze medalist(s)	Li Baolian	China	54.94	
4	Patty Kearney	United States	53.52	
5	Sonia Smith	Bermuda	52.30	
6	Ulrike Strauss	West Germany	50.19	
7	Mary Osborne	United States	48.59	
8	Eunice Luswell	Kenya	38.23	

=== Pentathlon ===
July 17

The highest mark recorded in each event is highlighted in yellow

Rank	Athlete	Nationality	100m H	SP	HJ	LJ	800m	Points	Notes
1st place, gold medalist(s)	Diane Konihowski	Canada	14.27	14.86	1.86	6.19	2:12.60	4640	
2nd place, silver medalist(s)	Marlene Harmon	United States	13.83	10.15	1.74	6.25	2:10.17	4346	
3rd place, bronze medalist(s)	Linda Waltman	United States	13.82	10.50	1.74	6.01	2:10.37	4314	
4	Ye Peisu	China	15.16	12.48	1.80	5.58	2:40.99	3882	
5	Karen Page	New Zealand	14.84	12.47	1.68	5.87	DNF	3309	
	Cornelia Sulek	West Germany	14.19	14.75	1.83	6.28	DNS	DNF	
	Marilyn King	United States	14.46	DNS	–	–	–	DNF	
