= 1980 United States Olympic trials (track and field) =

1980 United States Olympic track and field trials
- Dates: June 21–29
- Host city: Eugene, Oregon, United States
- Venue: Hayward Field
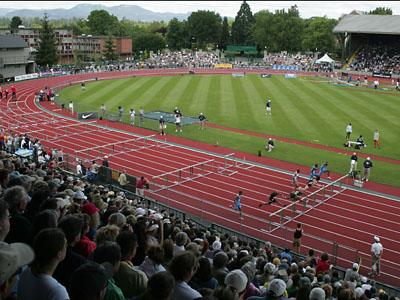
- Level: Senior
- Type: Outdoor

OU library Video on YouTube Women's Heptathlon Video on YouTube Men's 10,000

The 1980 United States Olympic trials for track and field were held at Hayward Field in Eugene, Oregon. These were the first such trials organized by the new national governing body for the sport of track and field, The Athletics Congress formed one year earlier as required by the Amateur Sports Act of 1978. Previous trials had been organized by the AAU. The eight-day competition lasted from June 21 until June 29.

Unlike any of the previous or subsequent years, the Olympic trials in 1980 did not select representatives to the 1980 Summer Olympics. By this point in the year, President Jimmy Carter had already announced the 1980 Summer Olympics boycott in protest of the Soviet invasion of Afghanistan and its flagrant human rights violations. This affected the competition. Some athletes did not compete or did not persevere through illness or injury as they might have if Olympic bids were on the line. Subsequently, some athletes, notably Tom Hintnaus and Gary Fanelli, chose to compete for other countries. Others like Franklin Jacobs retired.

The only qualifiers to another meet from this meet came from two women's exhibition events, the 400 m hurdles and 5000 meters, who were invited to the 1980 World Championships in Athletics. Many of the top 3 from this meet ran in the alternative to the Olympics, the Liberty Bell Classic, a few weeks later.

The trials for the men's and women's marathon were held May 24 in Buffalo, New York, and the trials for the men's 50 km race walk were held May 10 in Niagara Falls, New York.

== Men's results ==
Key: ≠ Athlete without "A" standard, not selected.

=== Men track events ===
Event	Gold		Silver		Bronze	
100 meters Wind 0.0	Stanley Floyd	10.26	Harvey Glance	10.27	Mel Lattany	10.30
200 meters Wind -1.5	James Butler	20.49	Cliff Wiley	20.54	Fred Taylor	20.70
400 meters	Bill Green	45.85	Willie Smith	45.97	Walter McCoy	46.06
800 meters	Don Paige	1:44.53	James Robinson	1:45.58	Randy Wilson	1:45.82
1500 meters	Steve Scott	3.35.15	Steve Lacy	3.36.23	Mike Durkin	3.38.04
5000 meters	Matt Centrowitz	13.30.62	Dick Buerkle	13.31.90	Bill McChesney	13.34.42
10,000 meters	Craig Virgin	27:45.61	Greg Fredericks	28.03.14	Alberto Salazar	28.10.42
110 m hurdles Wind +0.6	Renaldo Nehemiah	13.26	Dedy Cooper	13.39	Tonie Campbell	13.44
400 m hurdles	Edwin Moses	47.90	James Walker	49.04	David Lee; Bart Williams	49.34
3000 m s'chase	Henry Marsh	8.15.68 NR	Doug Brown	8.20.60	John Gregorek	8.21.32
20K racewalk	Marco Evoniuk; Jim Heiring	1:27:12			Dan O'Connor	1:29:05
50K racewalk	Carl Schueler	3:59:34	Marco Evoniuk	4:00:30	Dan O'Connor	4:11:03
Marathon	Tony Sandoval	2:10:19	Benji Durden	2:10:41	Kyle Heffner	2:10:55

=== Men field events ===
Event	Gold		Silver		Bronze	
High jump	Benn Fields	2.26 m (7 ft 4 3/4 in)	Nat Page	2.23 m (7 ft 3 3/4 in)	Jim Howard	2.23 m (7 ft 3 3/4 in)
Pole vault	Tom Hintnaus	5.60 m (18 ft 4 1/4 in)	Dan Ripley	5.55 m (18 ft 2 1/2 in)	Mike Tully	5.55 m (18 ft 2 1/2 in)
Long jump	Larry Myricks	8.28 m (27 ft 1 3/4 in) +1.7	Carl Lewis	8.01 m (26 ft 3 1/4 in)w +2.6	Randy Williams	7.92 m (25 ft 11 3/4 in) +1.2
Triple jump	Willie Banks	16.80 m (55 ft 1 1/4 in)	Paul Jordan	16.26 m (53 ft 4 in)	Greg Caldwell	16.22 m (53 ft 2 1/2 in)
Shot put	Pete Shmock	20.83 m (68 ft 4 in)	Al Feuerbach	20.82 m (68 ft 3 1/2 in)	Colin Anderson	20.73 m (68 ft 0 in)
Discus throw	Mac Wilkins	68.68 m (225 ft 3 in)	John Powell	68.00 m (223 ft 1 in)	Ben Plucknett	66.50 m (218 ft 2 in)
Hammer throw	Andy Bessette	70.98 m (232 ft 10 in)	John McArdle	70.38 m (230 ft 10 in)	Boris Djerassi	70.30 m (230 ft 7 in)
Javelin throw	Rod Ewaliko	88.70 m (291 ft 0 in)	Bruce Kennedy	83.64 m (274 ft 4 in)	Duncan Atwood	82.68 m (271 ft 3 in)
Decathlon	Bob Coffman	8184	Lee Palles	8159	Fred Dixon	8154

==== Notes ====
^{a}

== Women's results ==
=== Women track events ===
Event	Gold		Silver		Bronze	
100 meters Wind -0.5	Alice Brown	11.32	Brenda Morehead	11.43	Chandra Cheeseborough	11.45
200 meters Wind +2.4	Chandra Cheeseborough	22.70w	Karen Hawkins	23.04w	Pam Greene	23.21w
400 meters	Sherri Howard	51.48	Gwen Gardner	51.68	Denean Howard	51.70
800 meters	Madeline Manning	1:58.30	Julie Brown	2:00.96	Robin Campbell	2:01.23
1500 meters	Mary Decker	4:04.91	Julie Brown	4:07.13	Leann Warren	4:15.16
5000 meters	Julie Shea	15:44.12	Mary Shea	16:07.50	Brenda Webb	
10,000 meters	Kris Bankes	33:45.6				
100 m hurdles Wind -0.1	Stephanie Hightower	12.90	Benita Fitzgerald	13.11	Candy Young	13.30
400 m hurdles	Esther Mahr	57.46	Kim Whitehead	58.56	Debra Melrose	

=== Women field events ===
Event	Gold		Silver		Bronze	
High jump	Louise Ritter	1.86 m (6 ft 1 in)	Paula Girven	1.86 m (6 ft 1 in)	Pam Spencer	1.83 m (6 ft 0 in)
Long jump	Jodi Anderson	7.00 m (22 ft 11 1/2 in)	Kathy McMillan	6.76 m (22 ft 2 in)	Carol Lewis	6.56 m (21 ft 6 1/4 in)w
Shot put	Maren Seidler	17.92 m (58 ft 9 1/2 in)	Ann Turbyne	17.27 m (56 ft 7 3/4 in)	Lorna Griffin	15.89 m (52 ft 1 1/2 in)
Discus throw	Lorna Griffin	60.20 m (197 ft 6 in)	Lynne Winbigler	56.36 m (184 ft 10 in)	Lisa Vogelsang	53.84 m (176 ft 7 in)
Javelin throw	Karin Smith	58.52 m (191 ft 11 in)	Kate Schmidt	57.22 m (187 ft 8 in)	Mary Osborne	56.46 m (185 ft 2 in)
Heptathlon	Jodi Anderson	4697m/4651a	Marilyn King	4199m	Linda Waltman	4191m/4187a
