= 1980 USA Outdoor Track and Field Championships =

- Dates: June 14–15
- Host city: Walnut, California, United States
- Venue: Hilmer Lodge Stadium Mt. San Antonio College

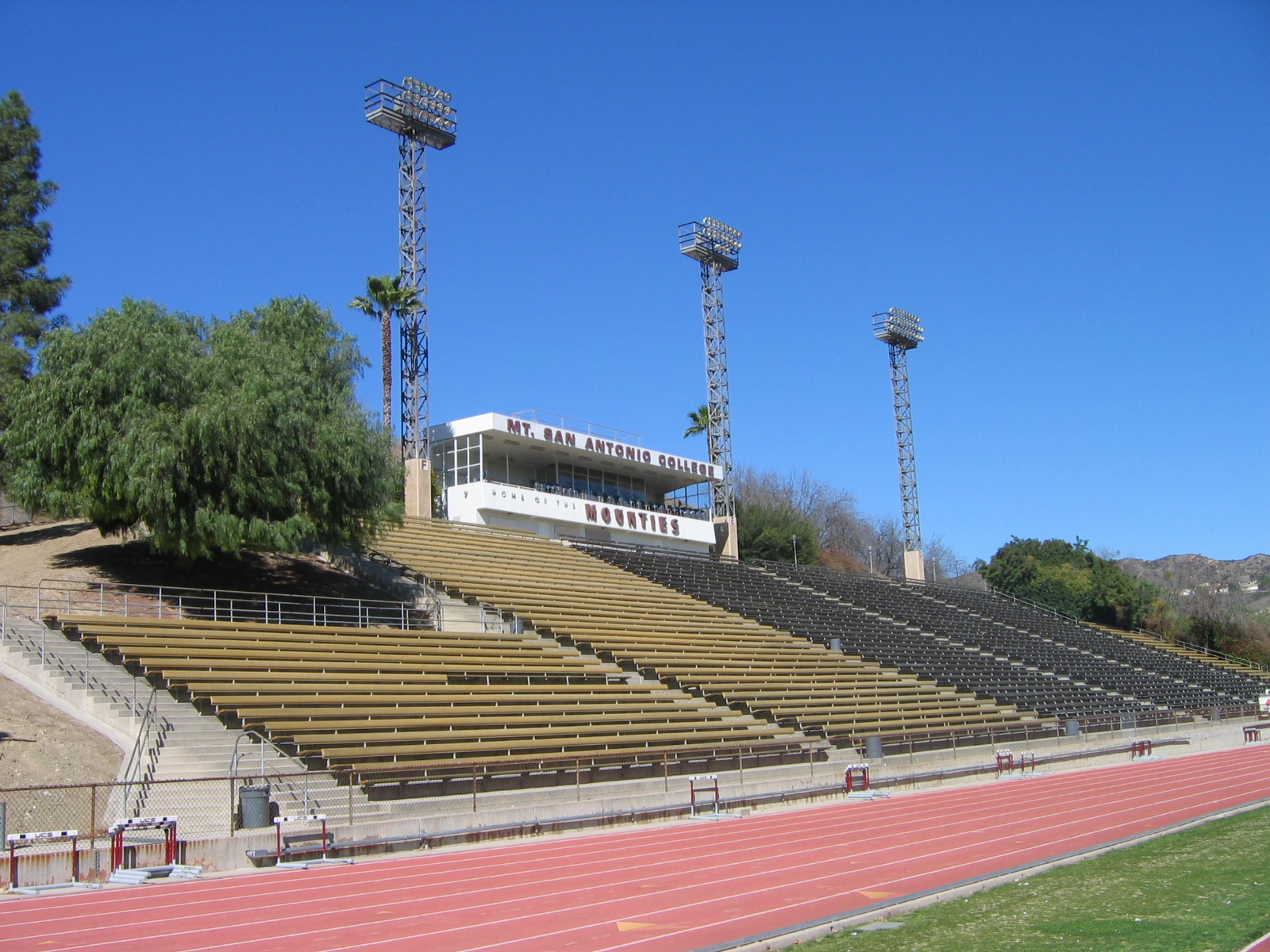

The 1980 USA Outdoor Track and Field Championships took place between June 14–15 at Hilmer Lodge Stadium on the campus of Mt. San Antonio College in Walnut, California. The 20K racewalk was held April 20 in Redmond, Washington. The decathlon was held at Hayward Field, University of Oregon in Eugene, Oregon on June 22–23. This was the first time the meet was organized by the newly formed organization The Athletics Congress (TAC).

In addition to being the National Championship, it was the selection meet to international teams including, in the women's 400 meters hurdles and 3000 meters, for the 1980 World Championships in Athletics.

== Results ==
=== Men track events ===
Event	Gold		Silver		Bronze	
100 meters	Stanley Floyd	10.19	James Gilkes; Guyana; Houston McTear	10.19 10.25	William Mullins	10.28
200 meters	LaMonte King	20.08 MRm	Millard Hampton	20.37	Frederick Taylor	20.48
400 meters	Willie Smith	45.36	Tony Darden	45.49	Charles Oliver	45.84
800 meters	James Robinson	1.46.2	David Korir; Kenya; Randy Wilson	1.46.3 1.46.4	Dan Futrell	1.46.9
1500 meters	Steve Lacy	3.40.86	Michael Durkin	3.41.12	Kevin Ryan	3.41.33
5000 meters	Matt Centrowitz	13.33.61	Steve Plasencia	13.34.83	Craig Virgin	13.35.65
10000 meters	Rodolfo Gomez; Mexico; Garry Bjorklund	28.44.0 28.49.4	Gary Tuttle	29.19.9	Barry Brown	29.23.7
Marathon (42.195 km.)	Frank Richardson	2.13.55	Hatsuo Okubo; Japan; Dave Smith	2.14.09 2.15.42	Keiichi Shimokutaki; Japan; Mark Sisson	2.16.32 2.16.32
110 meters hurdles	Renaldo Nehemiah	13.49	Dedy Cooper	13.56	Tonie Campbell	13.70
400 meters hurdles	David Lee	49.38	James King	49.43	Tim Hanlon	49.88
3000 meters steeplechase	Doug Brown	8.26.2	Henry Marsh	8.34.6	Solomon Chebor; Kenya; Greg Meyer	8.41.8 8.45.5
5000 m walk	Ray Sharp	20:27.8				
20 km walk	Dan O'Connor	1:26:16 CR	John Van Den Brandt	1:31:38	Torry Lingbloom	1:32:18

=== Men field events ===
Event	Gold		Silver		Bronze	
High jump	Franklin Jacobs	2.24 m (7 ft 4 in)	Nat Page	2.21 m (7 ft 3 in)	Dwight Stones	2.21 m (7 ft 3 in)
Pole vault	Tom Hintnaus	5.55 m (18 ft 2 1/2 in)	Dan Ripley	5.55 m (18 ft 2 1/2 in)	Greg Woepse	5.45 m (17 ft 10 1/2 in)
Long jump	Larry Myricks	8.26 m (27 ft 1 in)w	Larry Doubley	8.15 m (26 ft 8 3/4 in)	Arnie Robinson	8.08 m (26 ft 6 in)w
Triple jump	Willie Banks	17.36 m (56 ft 11 1/4 in)w	Doug Garner	16.94 m (55 ft 6 3/4 in)w	Greg Caldwell	16.63 m (54 ft 6 1/2 in)
Shot put	Brian Oldfield	21.82 m (71 ft 7 in) CR	Colin Anderson	21.09 m (69 ft 2 1/4 in)	Peter Shmock	20.62 m (67 ft 7 3/4 in)
Discus throw	Mac Wilkins	68.35 m (224 ft 2 in)	John Powell	67.79 m (222 ft 4 in)	Knut Hjeltnes; Norway; Ben Plucknett	65.83 m (215 ft 11 in) 65.25 m (214 ft 0 in)
Hammer throw	Giampaolo Urlando; Italy; Richard Olsen; Norway; Andy Bessette	76.58 m (251 ft 2 in) CR 74.47 m (244 ft 3 in) 70.53 m (231 ft 4 in)	Peter Farmer; Australia; Dave McKenzie	70.23 m (230 ft 4 in) 69.95 m (229 ft 5 in)	John McArdle	69.52 m (228 ft 1 in)
Javelin throw	Duncan Atwood	83.46 m (273 ft 9 in)	Tom Petranoff	83.39 m (273 ft 7 in)	Bob Roggy	82.73 m (271 ft 5 in)
Decathlon	Bobby Coffman	8184	Lee Palles	8159	Fred Dixon	8154

=== Women track events ===
Event	Gold		Silver		Bronze	
100 meters	Alice Brown	11.21	Brenda Morehead	11.30	Karen Hawkins	11.40
200 meters	Karen Hawkins	22.80w	Brenda Morehead	22.80w	Chandra Cheeseborough	23.04w
400 meters	Sherri Howard	51.51	Sharon Dabney	52.35	Gwen Gardner	52.35
800 meters	Madeline Manning	1.58.8	Robin Campbell	2.01.6	Mary Decker	2.02.3
1500 meters	Francie Larrieu	4.12.8	Cindy Bremser	4.13.7	Linda Goen	4.14.2
3000 meters	Julie Brown	9.07.9	Mary Shea	9.11.4	Rose Thomson	9.26.1
10000 meters	Judi St.Hilaire	33.31.1	Carol Urish	33.33.1	Betty Springs	33.34.9
Marathon Cupertino, CA	Sue Munday	2.43.18	Elise Van Housen	2.47.29	Sue Peterson	2.49.32
100 meters hurdles	Stephanie Hightower	13.14	Benita Fitzgerald	13.23	Linda Weekly	13.59
400 meters hurdles	Esther Mahr	56.3	Kim Whitehead	57.2	Debra Melrose	58.2
10,000 m walk	Sue Broddock	51:01.0				

=== Women field events ===
Event	Gold		Silver		Bronze	
High jump	Colleen Reinstra	1.93 m (6 ft 3 3/4 in)	Louise Ritter	1.88 m (6 ft 2 in)	Pam Spencer	1.88 m (6 ft 2 in)
Long jump	Jodi Anderson	6.65 m (21 ft 9 3/4 in)	Kathy McMillan	6.63 m (21 ft 9 in)w	Shonel Ferguson; Bahamas; Patricia Johnson	6.47 m (21 ft 2 1/2 in) 6.35 m (20 ft 10 in)w
Shot put	Maren Seidler	18.01 m (59 ft 1 in)	Lorna Griffin	16.42 m (53 ft 10 1/4 in)	Mary Jacobson	15.53 m (50 ft 11 1/4 in)
Discus throw	Lorna Griffin	58.44 m (191 ft 8 in)	Denise Wood	54.84 m (179 ft 11 in)	Lisa Vogelsang	52.80 m (173 ft 2 in)
Javelin throw	Karin Smith	60.68 m (199 ft 0 in)	Kathy Schmidt	60.20 m (197 ft 6 in)	Donna Mayhew	50.82 m (166 ft 8 in)
Pentathlon	Themis Zambrzycki; Brazil; Linda Waltman	4299 4187	Marilyn King	4169	Marlene Harmon	4142

== See also ==
- United States Olympic Trials (track and field)
