= 1982 USA Outdoor Track and Field Championships =

- Dates: June 18–20
- Host city: Knoxville, Tennessee
- Venue: Tom Black Track at LaPorte Stadium
- Level: Senior
- Type: Outdoor

The 1982 USA Outdoor Track and Field Championships was held from June 18 to 20 at Tom Black Track at LaPorte Stadium, on the campus of the University of Tennessee in Knoxville, Tennessee. The three-day competition served as the national championships in track and field for the United States. The meet was organized by The Athletics Congress.

== Results ==
=== Men track events ===
Event	Gold		Silver		Bronze	
100 meters (-0.5 m/s)	Carl Lewis	10.11	Calvin Smith	10.16	Mike Miller	10.32
200 meters (-0.2 m/s)	Calvin Smith	20.47	James Butler	20.63	Jeff Phillips	20.71
400 meters	Cliff Wiley	45.05	Darrell Robinson	45.22	Michael Paul Trinidad and Tobago; Sunder Nix	45.40; 45.51
800 meters	James Robinson	1:46.12	Johnny Gray	1:46.77	Mike Solomon Trinidad and Tobago; Jack McIntosh	1:47.31; 1:47.46
1500 meters	Steve Scott	3:34.92 CR	Sydney Maree South Africa; Ray Flynn Ireland; Jim Spivey	3:36.29; 3:36.47; 3:37.34	Chuck Aragon	3:38.35
5000 meters	Matt Centrowitz	13:31.96	Ralph King	13:33.83	Doug Padilla	13:35.37
10,000 meters	Craig Virgin	28:33.02	Steve Ortiz	28:33.58	Robbie Perkins	28:35.04
110 meters hurdles (-0.7 m/s)	Willie Gault	13.15	Milan Stewart	13.48	Larry Cowling	13.55
400 meters hurdles	David Patrick	48.57	Andre Phillips	48.62	David Lee	48.96
3000 meters steeplechase	Henry Marsh	8:22.94	John Gregorek	8:23.62	Ricky Pittman	8:25.49
20 kilometres race walk	Jim Heiring	1:30:22	Ray Sharp	1:32:30	Marco Evoniuk	1:33:28

=== Men field events ===
Event	Gold		Silver		Bronze	
High jump	Milt Ottey Canada; Benn Fields	7 ft 5 3/4 in (2.27 m); 7 ft 4 1/2 in (2.24 m)	Nat Page	7 ft 4 1/2 in (2.24 m)	Dwight Stones	7 ft 4 1/2 in (2.24 m)
Pole vault	Dan Ripley	18 ft 9 1/4 in (5.72 m) AR, MR	Billy Olson	18 ft 9 1/4 in (5.72 m) AR, MR	Dave Volz	18 ft 5 1/4 in (5.61 m)
Long jump	Carl Lewis	27 ft 10 in (8.48 m)	Jason Grimes	26 ft 8 1/2 in (8.14 m)	Larry Myricks	26 ft 7 1/4 in (8.1 m)
Triple jump	Robert Cannon	55 ft 0 3/4 in (16.78 m)	Paul Jordan	54 ft 10 3/4 in (16.73 m)	Willie Banks	54 ft 10 1/4 in (16.71 m)
Shot put	Kevin Akins	69 ft 9 1/2 in (21.27 m)	Dean Crouser	69 ft 1 1/2 in (21.06 m)	Dave Laut	68 ft 7 3/4 in (20.92 m)
Discus throw	Luis Delis Cuba; Mac Wilkins	225 ft 5 in (68.7 m); 223 ft 9 in (68.19 m)	John Powell	218 ft 9 in (66.67 m)	Art Burns	217 ft 3 in (66.21 m)
Hammer throw	Dave McKenzie	235 ft 2 in (71.67 m)	Ed Burke	234 ft 11 in (71.6 m)	Bill Green	230 ft 1 in (70.12 m)
Javelin throw	Bob Roggy	289 ft 9 in (88.31 m) MR	Rod Ewaliko	278 ft 2 in (84.78 m)	Tom Petranoff	273 ft 10 in (83.46 m)
Decathlon	Herbert Peter West Germany; John Crist	8187/8138; 8087/8071	Jim Howell	8038/8017	Mike Brown	7819/7757

=== Women track events ===
Event	Gold		Silver		Bronze	
100 meters	Evelyn Ashford	10.96	Merlene Ottey Jamaica; Florence Griffith	11.06; 11.15	Diane Williams	11.18
200 meters	Merlene Ottey Jamaica; Florence Griffith	22.17; 22.58	Randy Givens	23.05	Chandra Cheeseborough	23.05
400 meters	Denean Howard	50.87	Rosalyn Bryant	51.34	Arlise Emerson	51.89
800 meters	Delisa Walton	2.00.91	Yvonne Hannus Finland; Joetta Clark	2.01.73; 2.02.09	Sue Addison	2.02.14
1500 meters	Mary Decker Tabb	4.03.37	Leann Warren	4.10.23	Cindy Bremser	4.11.29
3000 meters	Francie Larrieu	8.58.66	Janice Merrill	8.59.07	Cindy Bremser	9.00.38
10000 meters	Kim Schnurpfeil	33.25.88	Julie Shea	33.38.74	Michelle Mason	33.48.11
Marathon (San Francisco)	Lorraine Moller New Zealand; Carey May Ireland; Laurie Binder	2.36.13; 2.38.31.7; 2.39.45.5	Eileen Claugus	2.42.59	Iciar Martinez Spain; Sharlet Gilbert	2.43.32; 2.43.42
100 meters hurdles	Stephanie Hightower	12.86 MR	Benita Fitzgerald	13.01	Candy Young	13.14
400 meters hurdles	Tammy Etienne	56.55	Tonja Brown	57.43	Edna Brown	57.49
10,000 m walk	Sue Liers-Westerfield	50:59				

=== Women field events ===
Event	Gold		Silver		Bronze	
High jump	Deborah Brill Canada; Phyllis Blunston	1.95 m (6 ft 4 3/4 in); 1.92 m (6 ft 3 1/2 in)	Coleen Sommer	1.88 m (6 ft 2 in)	Joni Huntley	1.86 m (6 ft 1 in)
Long Jump	Carol Lewis	6.81 m (22 ft 4 in)	Jodi Anderson	6.67 m (21 ft 10 1/2 in)	Shonel Ferguson Bahamas; Jennifer Inniss Guyana; Tudie McKnight Jamaica; Kathy McMillan	6.65 m (21 ft 9 3/4 in); 6.61 m (21 ft 8 in); 6.57 m (21 ft 6 1/2 in); 6.54 m (21 ft 5 1/4 in)
Shot Put	Maria Elena Sarria Cuba; Rosemarie Hauch Canada; Denise Wood	18.80 m (61 ft 8 in); 16.96 m (55 ft 7 1/2 in); 16.48 m (54 ft 3/4 in)	Sandy Burke	16.2 m (53 ft 1 3/4 in)	Lorna Griffin	16.12 m (52 ft 10 1/2 in)
Discus Throw	Ria Stalman Netherlands; Leslie Deniz	62.13 m (203 ft 10 in); 58.21 m (190 ft 11 in)	Kathy Picknell	56.79 m (186 ft 3 in)	Lorna Griffin	56.11 m (184 ft 1 in)
Javelin throw	Lynda Hughes	61.64 m (202 ft 2 in)	Karin Smith	60.83 m (199 ft 6 in)	Mayra Vila Cuba; Kathy Schmidt	59.99 m (196 ft 9 in); 59.69 m (195 ft 10 in)
Heptathlon	Jackie Joyner	6041	Cindy Greiner	5950	Marlene Harmon	6902
