= Liberty Bell Classic =

Sports event held on July 16 and 17, 1980

- Venue: Franklin Field
- Location: Philadelphia, Pennsylvania, U.S.
- Dates: July 16–17, 1980
- Nations: 29

The Liberty Bell Classic was a track and field athletics event organized by the Athletics Congress as part of the 1980 Summer Olympics boycott and held at Franklin Field at the University of Pennsylvania in Philadelphia on July 16 and 17, 1980. It was named after Philadelphia's Liberty Bell.

The U.S. Congress voted to approve $10 million in funding to alternative tournaments in several Olympic sports, to which athletes from boycotting countries would be invited. In addition to the Liberty Bell Classic, the U.S. Gymnastics Federation held an International Invitational tournament in Hartford, Connecticut. Earlier in the year, the United States had considered holding other games in Côte d'Ivoire, Italy, Japan, West Germany, China or in Canada (in Montréal, where the previous Olympic games took place).

The IAAF prohibited any official track and field meets that would clash with the Olympic meet, so the Liberty Bell began three days before the Moscow Games opened (and ten days before the Olympic athletics events began). The Liberty Bell came the day after the prestigious Bislett Games in Oslo, and many eligible athletes declined to compete, including 17 of the 34 champions at the US Olympic Trials. The winning performances in the men's 110 m hurdles and 400 m hurdles were better than those in Moscow.

== Participants ==
Athletes from 29 countries participated in the event, many of which had taken part in the American-led boycott of the 1980 Summer Olympics, including:

- Antigua and Barbuda
- Bahamas
- Barbados
- Bermuda
- Canada
- Central African Republic
- Chile
- China
- Egypt
- Gambia
- Ireland*
- Israel
- Italy*
- Ivory Coast
- Japan
- Kenya
- Luxembourg*
- New Zealand
- Philippines
- South Korea
- Sudan
- Swaziland
- Thailand
- Togo
- Turkey
- United States
- U.S. Virgin Islands
- West Germany
- Zaire

Countries marked with an asterisk (*) went on to be represented in the 1980 Summer Olympics under the Olympic flag.

== Medal summary ==
=== Men's events ===
Event	Gold		Silver		Bronze	
100 meters	Mel Lattany; United States	10.31	Harvey Glance; United States	10.31	Willie Gault; United States	10.33
200 meters	James Butler; United States	20.65	Fred Taylor; United States	20.66	Desai Williams; Canada	20.92
400 meters	Billy Konchellah; Kenya	45.59	Hassan El Kachief; Sudan	45.60	Bill Green; United States	45.79
800 meters	Don Paige; United States	1:47.19	Omer Khalifa; Sudan	1:47.27	Randy Wilson; United States	1:48.03
1500 meters	Steve Scott; United States	3:40.19	Omer Khalifa; Sudan	3:40.34	Mike Durkin; United States	3:41.40
5000 meters	Kip Rono; Kenya	13:37.52	Hillary Tuwei; Kenya	13:39.72	Greg Duhaime; Canada	13:45.77
110 meter hurdles	Renaldo Nehemiah; United States	13.31	Tonie Campbell; United States	13.68	Hans-Gerd Klein; West Germany	13.94
400 meter hurdles	James Walker; United States	48.6	David Lee; United States	49.1	Bart Williams; United States	50.0
4 × 100 meter relay	United States (USA); Mel Lattany; Harvey Glance; James Butler; Carl Lewis	38.61	Canada (CAN); Tony Sharpe; Desai Williams; Marvin Nash; Ben Johnson	39.54	Thailand (THA)	41.29
4 × 400 meter relay	United States (USA); Walter McCoy; Fred Taylor; David Lee; Herman Frazier	3:03.20	Kenya (KEN); James Atuti; Billy Konchellah; James Maina Boi; Daniel Kimaiyo	3:05.72	Sudan (SUD)	3:09.06
High jump	Benn Fields; United States	2.26 m	Nat Page; United States	2.26 m	Dietmar Mögenburg; West Germany; Carlo Thränhardt; West Germany	2.22 m
Pole vault	Tom Hintnaus; United States	5.50 m	Steve Lawry; United States	5.33 m	Zhang Cheng; China	5.18 m
Long jump	Larry Myricks; United States	8.20 m	Larry Doubley; United States	7.95 m	Carl Lewis; United States	7.77 m
Triple jump	Zhou Zhenxian; China	16.90 m	Greg Caldwell; United States	16.75 m	Steve Hanna; Bahamas	16.42 m
Shot put	Youssef Nagui Asaad; Egypt	19.69 m	Ian Pyka; United States	19.58 m	Gert Weil; Chile	16.17 m
Discus throw	Ben Plucknett; United States	61.46 m	Al Oerter; United States	60.76 m	Alwin Wagner; West Germany	59.48 m
Hammer throw	Scott Neilson; Canada	72.62 m	Boris Djerassi; United States	71.34 m	Andy Bessette; United States	69.08 m
Javelin throw	Shen Maomao; China	89.12 m	Tom Petranoff; United States	84.56 m	Gheorghe Megelea; Canada	79.24 m
Decathlon	Bobby Coffman; United States	8058	Lee Palles; United States	8009	Wang Kangqiang; China	7015

=== Women's events ===
Event	Gold		Silver		Bronze	
100 meters	Chandra Cheeseborough; United States	11.27	Jeanette Bolden; United States	11.41	Karen Hawkins; United States	11.43
200 meters	Angella Taylor; Canada	22.77	Chandra Cheeseborough; United States	22.84	Karen Hawkins; United States	23.41
400 meters	Gwen Gardner; United States	52.04	Charmaine Crooks; Canada	52.33	Roberta Belle; United States	52.34
800 meters	Yvonne Mondesire; Canada	2:02.34	Robin Campbell; United States	2:02.53	Ann Mackie-Morelli; Canada	2:02.63
1500 meters	Mary Decker; United States	4:00.87	Julie Brown; United States	4:10.37	Francie Larrieu; United States	4:10.39
100 meter hurdles	Stephanie Hightower; United States	13.08	Benita Fitzgerald; United States	13.17	Esther Rot; Israel	13.20
4 × 100 meter relay	United States (USA); Chandra Cheeseborough; Karen Hawkins; Kathy McMillan; Jeanette Bolden	44.57	West Germany (FRG)	45.26	Thailand (THA)	46.90
4 × 400 meter relay	United States (USA); Kim Thomas; Delisa Walton; Robin Campbell; Roberta Belle	3:32.69	Canada (CAN)	3:33.50		
High jump	Zheng Dazhen; China	1.92 m	Brigitte Reid; Canada	1.84 m	Paula Girven; United States	1.80 m
Long jump	Kathy McMillan; United States	6.65 m	Carol Lewis; United States	6.60 m	Shonel Ferguson; Bahamas	6.48 m
Shot put	Shen Lijuan; China	17.09 m	Ann Turbyne; United States	16.24 m	Lu Cheng; China	15.98 m
Discus throw	Xie Jianhua; China	56.56 m	Lucette Moreau; Canada	55.20 m	Lorna Griffin; United States	53.52 m
Javelin throw	Laurie Kern; Canada	57.42 m	Tang Guoli; China	55.30 m	Li Baolian; China	54.94 m
Pentathlon	Diane Konihowski; Canada	4640	Marlene Harmon; United States	4346	Linda Waltman; United States	4314

== See also ==
- 1980 Summer Olympics boycott
- 1980 in athletics (track and field)
- 1980 World Championships in Athletics
- Athletics at the Friendship Games, 1984 events in Moscow and Prague as part of the 1984 Summer Olympics boycott
- Politics and sports
- Goodwill Games
