= Justin Gloden =

Luxembourgish long-distance runner

Justin Gloden (born 22 March 1953 in Elvange) is a Luxembourgish athlete competing in the long-distance events. He represented his country in the marathon at the 1988 Summer Olympics finishing 36th out of 118 competitors. He also competed at the 1983 and 1987 World Championships.

He is the national record holder in all distance events from the 1500 metres to the marathon. In 1980, he was chosen Luxembourgish Sportsman of the Year.

He was also a footballer playing for Spora Luxembourg. He got 1 cap for the Luxembourg national football team in a 1975 friendly against Germany.

== Competition record ==
| Year | Competition | Venue | Position | Event | Notes |
Representing Luxembourg
| 1978 | European Championships | Prague, Czechoslovakia | 16th (h) | 800 m | 1:49.0 |
| 1978 | European Championships | Prague, Czechoslovakia | – | 5000 m | DNF |
| 1980 | Liberty Bell Classic | Philadelphia, United States | 6th | 1500 m | 3:43.43 |
| 1982 | European Championships | Athens, Greece | 10th (h) | 1500 m | 3:41.62 |
| 1983 | World Championships | Helsinki, Finland | 27th (sf) | 5000 m | 14:12.25 |
| 1987 | Games of the Small States of Europe | Monaco | 1st | 10,000 m | 29:44.62 |
| 1987 | World Championships | Rome, Italy | 38th | Marathon | 2:30:08 |
| 1988 | Olympic Games | Seoul, South Korea | 36th | Marathon | 2:22:14 |
| 1990 | European Championships | Split, Yugoslavia | – | Marathon | DNF |
| 1991 | Games of the Small States of Europe | Andorra la Vella, Andorra | 1st | 10,000 m | 31:24.41 |

== Personal bests ==
Outdoor

- 800 metres – 1:49.00 (Prague 1978)
- 1500 metres – 3:39.92 (Cologne 1980)
- One mile – 3:59.4 (Brussels 1980)
- 2000 metres – 5:07.6 (Luxembourg 1978)
- 3000 metres – 7:54.2 (Bonn 1982)
- 5000 metres – 13:38.51 (Louvain 1983)
- 10,000 metres – 28:46.4 (Louvain 1984)
- 20,000 metres – 1:00:04.6 (Diekirch 1985)
- One hour – 19.970 (Diekirch 1985)
- Half marathon – 1:04:05 (Trier 1985)
- 25,000 metres – 1:16:26 (Berlin 1980)
- 30,000 metres – 1:36:12 (Frankfurt 1984)
- Marathon – 2:14:03 (Frankfurt 1985)

Indoor

- 3000 metres – 8:06.6 (Vittel 1983)
