= Hawaii Five-0 (2010 TV series) season 4 =

Hawaii Five-0
- Season 4
- Season 4 U.S. DVD cover
- Showrunner: Peter M. Lenkov
- Starring: Alex O'Loughlin; Scott Caan; Daniel Dae Kim; Grace Park; Masi Oka; Michelle Borth; Chi McBride
- No. of episodes: 22

Release
- Original network: CBS
- Original release: September 27, 2013 – May 9, 2014

Season chronology
- ← Previous; Season 3 Next → Season 5

The fourth season of the CBS crime drama series Hawaii Five-0 premiered on Friday, September 27, 2013 and concluded on May 9, 2014. The season consisted of 22 episodes.

== Cast and characters ==
=== Main cast ===
- Alex O'Loughlin as Lieutenant Commander Steven "Steve" McGarrett, United States Naval Reserve
- Scott Caan as Detective Daniel "Danny" "Danno" Williams
- Daniel Dae Kim as Lieutenant Chin Ho Kelly
- Grace Park as Officer Kono Kalakaua
- Masi Oka as Dr. Max Bergman
- Michelle Borth as Lieutenant Catherine Rollins, United States Navy (retired), later Five-0 member
- Chi McBride as HPD Captain Lou Grover

=== Recurring ===
- Taylor Wily as Kamekona
- Dennis Chun as HPD Sergeant Duke Lukela
- Ian Anthony Dale as Adam Noshimuri
- Teilor Grubbs as Grace Williams
- Shawn Mokuahi-Garnett as Flippa
- Justin Bruening as Lieutenant Commander William "Billy" Harrington, United States Navy (retired)
- Brian Yang as Charlie Fong
- Richard T. Jones as Governor Sam Denning
- Jorge Garcia as Jerry Ortega

=== Guest stars ===
- Mark Dacascos as Wo Fat
- Autumn Reeser as Dr. Gabrielle "Gabby" Asano
- Terry O'Quinn as Lieutenant Commander Joe White, United States Navy (retired)
- Rumer Willis as Sabrina Lane
- Taryn Manning as Mary Ann McGarrett
- Nick Jonas as Ian Wright
- Henry Ian Cusick as Ernesto
- Nestor Serrano as El Condor
- Tim Daly as Ray Harper
- Wild Oak Will as Ellis Gregory
- Briana Lane as Dahlia Swaine
- Lacey Beeman as Abbie Maxwell
- Kenneth Matepi as William Ellery
- Yosef Kaznetzkov as Brock Upton
- Daryl Hannah as Cherie Tranton
- Brian Tee as Hideaki Kuroda
- Xzibit as Jason Dekker
- Louis Ozawa Changchien as Sato
- Tom Hintnaus as Dante Barkov
- Carol Burnett as Deb
- Zay Harding as Matt Haley
- James Saito as David Toriyama
- Jack Axelrod as Ezra Clark
- James Urbaniak as Gary Nathan
- Heather Dubrow as Emily
- Karl Makinen as Jack Anderson
- Lili Simmons as Amber Vitale
- Robert Knepper as Internal Affairs Officer Coughlin
- Reiko Aylesworth as Malia
- Christopher Sean as Gabriel Waincroft
- Michael Madsen as Roy Parish
- Lyndon Smith as Lauren Parish
- Matthew Glave as Julian Lynch
- Ethan Embry as Shawn Hutten
- Melanie Griffith as Clara Williams
- Elaine Tan as Zi Chen
- Conor Leslie as Kelly Donovon
- Booboo Stewart as Tommy Fa'aloa
- James Brennan as Sam Connors
- Peter Shinkoda as Alan Kim
- Mackenzie Astin as Bradley Richmond
- David Gautreaux as Edward Cobb
- Sasha Pieterse as Dawn Hatfield
- Mido Hamada as Amir Khan
- Mallika Sherawat as Farah Khan
- Farshad Farahat as Umar Hassan
- Paige Hurd as Samantha Grover
- Richard Burgi as Novak
- Duane "Dog" Chapman as himself
- Bryan Anderson as Kirk Emerson

== Episodes ==
The title of each episode is in the Hawaiian language with the English translation underneath.

No. overall	No. in season	Title	Directed by	Written by	Original release date	Prod. code	U.S. viewers (millions)
72	1	"Aloha Ke Kahi I Ke Kahi" "We Need Each Another"	Bryan Spicer	Peter M. Lenkov & Ken Solarz	September 27, 2013	401	9.46
Continuing from the previous episode, NLM gunmen break into Wo Fat's cell, but McGarrett saves him by killing all but one of them, Ricardo Cosi. After taking him to Five-0 headquarters to interrogate him, more NLM gunmen seize 'Iolani Palace, the building where Five-0 is situated, and hold everyone hostage to retrieve Cosi. McGarrett and Danny hide him, until the leader (Henry Ian Cusick) threatens to kill the hostages if they do not surrender. The terrorists kill Cosi, and willingly surrender. McGarrett then learns that NLM leader "El Condor" (Nestor Serrano) has kidnapped Catherine Rollins. To save her, McGarrett has to break the NLM out of custody of new SWAT commander Lou Grover (Chi McBride) which ultimately leaves Grover at odds with Five-0. Later, McGarrett visits Wo Fat before he leaves Hawaii for the reason Doris visited him, and Wo Fat claims she came to apologize for killing his father. Toast later analyses the footage from the destroyed tablet table and the team discover that during the siege the NLM found Adam and Kono's location in Zhejiang, China and sold it to the Yakuza, prompting Chin to call Kono and warn her while also stating that she and Adam should leave right away. Kono and Adam attempt to do so, only to discover that Yazuka members are already at their hideout.
73	2	"Aʻale Maʻa Wau" "Fish Out of Water"	Joe Dante	John Dove	October 4, 2013	402	9.75
Kono and Adam survive a Yakuza assault and escape from their safe house. In Hawaii, Five-0 investigate the murder of a limo driver. They find that before his murder, the driver picked up Texas Ranger Ray Harper (Tim Daly). Harper informs the team that his daughter was kidnapped, and he is after her abductors. During the course of their investigation they learn that Harper's daughter had run away to Hawaii with her boyfriend, 18-year-old Carl Jacobson (it is implied they had sex at one point or another). Carl had actually gone to Hawaii to transport money for some other criminals, but he was robbed. In retaliation, the bosses expecting the money kidnapped Harpers daughter and demanded the money be returned back to them. Carl is wired up and sent in only to learn Harper's daughter/his girlfriend had been sold off to another group. In the meantime, McGarrett learns that former Navy colleague Billy Harrington (Justin Bruening) offered Catherine a job at his private security firm, as she is considering leaving the Navy.
74	3	"Kaʻoia iʻo Ma Loko" "The Truth Within"	Duane Clark	Steven Lilien & Bryan Wynbrandt	October 11, 2013	403	9.24
Married couple Kaylea and Phillip Van Horn are found murdered in their swimming pool, and evidence points towards a professional hit. They later find that one of their artifacts, an emblem of the Royal League, a disbanded secret society, of which Phillip's great-great grandfather was a member, is missing. The team turns to Jerry Ortega (Jorge Garcia), an old friend of Chin's and a conspiracy theorist. He suggests that the killers wanted the emblem as "the key" to find rings smuggled from Italy that are hidden in Hawaii. The team later celebrate Catherine's retirement, and McGarrett enlists Max to procure a special gift for the ceremony.
75	4	"A ia la aku" "From This Day Forward"	Bryan Spicer	Christina M. Kim & David Wolkove	October 18, 2013	405	8.81
Five-0 investigate the shooting death of a wedding crasher, Brad Dixon. McGarrett suspects the runaway bride, Dahlia Swaine (Briana Lane), after video footage shows her scared reaction after seeing the victim, indicating the two had a history. Chin Ho discovers that the victim ran several scams with Dahlia, revealed to be his sister Nicole Dixon, as an accomplice. They later find Nicole, barely alive from an apparent car accident. After she is stabilized, Five-0 learns that someone actually kicked her car over the edge, and evidence points towards her brother trying to kill her. Meanwhile, Kono and Adam capture a Yakuza operative in Hong Kong and learn that the hit has been ordered by Riku Sato, a former ally of Adam's. Together the two learn that Kono is wanted dead as well, and that the hit is not about revenge for Michael Noshimori's death.
76	5	"Kupuʻeu" "Fallen Hero"	Jeffrey Hunt	Moira Kirland & Eric Guggenheim	October 25, 2013	404	9.46
On a routine assignment, Catherine and Billy Harrington witness a hit man killing their subject, John Cutler, and wounds the two, with Billy later dying in hospital from injuries sustained in the gunfight while Catherine survives albeit with an injured left arm. Five-0 return to the house to find it had been cleaned out of any evidence. After finding Cutler's body in his second car, the team learns from his encrypted laptop that he was spying on his wife's security company on orders from a rival company. Five-0 realizes that the company's CEO was responsible for cleaning up the scene, but still agrees to give them all the evidence they gathered although the evidence is later discovered to have been contaminated, further complicating the investigation. Meanwhile, McGarrett asks Joe White (Terry O'Quinn) to track down Doris, only to learn that his mother is active with the CIA again. In Hong Kong, Adam allows himself to be captured for Kono's safety. The team later say goodbye to Billy who is buried with full military honors.
77	6	"Kupouli ʻla" "Broken"	John Terlesky	Sue Palmer & David Wolkove	November 1, 2013	406	9.71
While Max is attending a Halloween party, a police officer shoots a crazed doctor Michael Besner who later infects Max too. Five-0 find traces of a drug that drug cartels use to control their victims. They soon realize that Besner entered a morgue to cut off the head of a corpse, Lisa Mills, who died in a car accident. She was presumed missing a year earlier before she resurfaced, and Five-0 believe that Lisa was kidnapped after finding cameras in her car and apartment. Meanwhile, Catherine finds one of Sato's lieutenants, Hideaki Kuroda (Brian Tee), in Hawaii.
78	7	"Ua Nalohia" "In Deep"	Joe Dante	Story by : John Dove & Noah Nelson; Teleplay by : Bradley Paul	November 8, 2013	407	9.51
Five-0 investigate the murder of Bryan Carpenter, but later learn he is Matt Hutchins, who Chin recognises as a former police academy cadet. He was working deep undercover for the ATF to infiltrate a gang of gun runners run by Jason Dekker (Xzibit). After finding $100,000 cash belonging to Hutchins, Danno suspects he turned bad. However, it is later revealed that Dekker loaned him the money, and Hutchins was using it to find a mole in the ATF, who is feeding information on the rival gangs. Meanwhile, during the course of the investigation, Mary (Taryn Manning) returns with her adoptive baby daughter, who the team have to look after while Mary has food poisoning. Elsewhere, Chin and Grover have a meeting at a coffee house, where Grover warns Chin that Steve's behavior could result in alienation from HPD. Catherine captures Kuroda and later learns of Sato's location, after which she officially joins Five-0.
79	8	"Akanahe" "Reluctant Partners"	Jerry Levine	Steven Lilien & Bryan Wynbrandt	November 15, 2013	408	9.90
Kono helps Five-0 minus Danny, who is in New Jersey with his family to celebrate his father turning 60, capture Sato (Louis Ozawa Changchien), who reveals that Adam is not dead. Kono leaves again to find him. Afterwards, Governor Denning (Richard T. Jones) forces Grover and McGarrett to work together to serve an arrest warrant to Ian Wright (Nick Jonas) for unpaid parking tickets. After arriving in his home, the two are ambushed and Ian is kidnapped. Five-0 discover that the kidnappers are professional bank robbers, and Wright is also an expert computer hacker who helped the gang rob a bank. He later taunts McGarrett through messages on a hacked ATM, to which McGarrett replies that he will catch him next time.
80	9	"Hauʻoli La HoʻomaikaʻI" "Happy Thanksgiving"	Allison Liddi-Brown	Eric Guggenheim & Moira Kirland	November 22, 2013	409	9.92
Five-0 investigate the murder of Kyle Russo, a Secret Service agent who is found in a barrel of lye, and learns that the President is visiting Hawaii to participate in a secret meeting with North Korean delegates. They identify the assassin, Dante Barkov (Tom Hintnaus), who is wanted by Interpol. After finding one of his accomplices, it is revealed that the President is not the target, but a young woman, Andrea Hicks, who is in hiding after witnessing a murder in Dallas. Meanwhile, McGarrett's aunt Deb (Carol Burnett) pays a surprise visit for Thanksgiving, where she reveals that she has an inoperable brain tumor and chooses not to seek treatment which leaves Steve devastated. Kono finds a lead to Adam's location in Seattle.
81	10	"Hoʻonani Makuakane" "Honor Thy Father"	Larry Teng	Peter M. Lenkov & Ken Solarz	December 13, 2013	410	9.13
McGarrett stops David Toriyama (James Saito) from killing Ezra Clark (Jack Axelrod), a Pearl Harbor veteran. Toriyama claims that Ezra murdered his father, James Toriyama in 1943 following the internment of Japanese American citizens, including the Toriyamas, in order to steal the family katana, despite the official record that David's father was killed by a fellow internee. Five-0 decide to investigate the claim, where they learn that there was a cover up of the events, but Ezra was not responsible for the murder. Note: This is the first episode to feature Chi McBride as a main cast member.
82	11	"Pukana" "Keepsake"	Bryan Spicer	Bill Haynes	December 20, 2013	411	9.62
Five-0 investigate the murder of a serial burglar, later identified as Victor Dobbs by Kamekona, found in the trunk of a car. They find a laptop at his residence containing a list of all the homes Dobbs burgled. As Catherine and Chin search the houses, Five-0 receive a visit from the FBI, who informs them that the murderer is a serial killer who killed at least 14 women after imprisoning them for 24 hours. Chin finds the house where Dobbs was killed, only to be held captive by the owner, Gary Nathan (James Urbaniak), the serial killer, who later kidnaps his girlfriend Emily (Heather Dubrow) when she makes an unexpected visit. Meanwhile, Danny and Grace find a puzzle box washed up on the beach, from Japan after the 2011 tsunami, with a locket and a girl's face in it. The girl is found to have died during the earthquake. Danny and Grace then travel to a temporary housing shelter in Ishinomaki, Japan to return the box to the family's only survivor. Kono's trail to Adam leads her to Vancouver, British Columbia.
83	12	"O kela me keia Manawa" "Now and Then"	Peter Weller	John Dove	January 10, 2014	412	10.74
Five-0 are searching for Jack Anderson (Karl Makinen), a friend of Grover's who is on the run after killing a local gangster outside a bar. The team later discover that Anderson is really Jack Mitchell, a former Green Beret wanted for the manslaughter of the wife of Matt Haley (Zay Harding), a newlywed couple twenty years before. Further evidence reveals that the victim's husband who is in Hawaii ordered a hit out against him. The team must find Mitchell, who has long since disappeared, and the victim's vengeful husband before the situation ends badly. Meanwhile, Danno flirts with a young woman, Amber Vitale (Lili Simmons), at a gas station, only to later rescue her after she was shot while on a drive. Kono reunites with Adam in Vancouver to tell him that he is now free from Yakuza reprisal.
84	13	"Hana Lokomaikaʻi" "The Favor"	Sylvain White	Story by : Peter M. Tassler; Teleplay by : Peter M. Lenkov & Ken Solarz	January 17, 2014	413	10.63
Chin Ho is questioned by an Internal Affairs agent (Robert Knepper) about his relationship with Malia (Reiko Aylesworth) and his father's murder in a convenience store robbery 15 years before, which until recently remained unsolved. This ties into a recent discovery of the body of an undercover DEA informant, who was tortured for infiltrating a cartel after the arrival of their boss, Gabriel Waincroft (Christopher Sean), Malia's brother who Chin Ho always suspected of being his father's killer. It is later revealed that Internal Affairs suspects Chin of stealing Waincroft's $25 million, a charge Chin strongly denies.
85	14	"Na hala a ka makua" "Sins of the Father"	Peter Weller	David Wolkove	January 31, 2014	414	11.24
Roy Parish (Michael Madsen) is found guilty of the murder of a real estate manager, but manages to escape from the courthouse. As Five-0 and the Honolulu Police Department start an island-wide search, Parish hides in Danno's car and holds him and McGarrett at gunpoint. He forces them to a construction site to confront the star witness, who Parish claims lied under oath and framed him. Meanwhile, Grace (Teilor Grubbs) gets into trouble when she punches someone at school for picking on one of her friends and Danny must decide how to discipline her when he finds out the reason behind her behavior.
86	15	"Pale ʻla" "Buried Secrets"	Jerry Levine	Moira Kirkland	February 28, 2014	415	10.61
Five-0 investigate the murder of estate agent Guy Ingram, whose mummified remains were found behind the wall of one of the houses he was selling. Ballistics match a weapon used previously that was supposedly confiscated and destroyed. They then realise that one of the employees of the smelter, George Moku, is selling those guns. Meanwhile, reporter Shawn Hutten (Ethan Embry) presses Grover about his past in Chicago. Grover finally confesses to McGarrett about the real reason why he moved to Hawaii. Danno's mother Clara Williams (Melanie Griffith) pays a visit and has some shocking news for her son.
87	16	"Hoku Welowelo" "Fire in the Sky"	Jeffrey Hunt	Steven Lilien & Bryan Wynbrandt	March 7, 2014	416	10.35
A honeymooning couple are gunned down whilst deep sea fishing after they witness a "falling star" crashing into the ocean. A panel of carbon graphite is found impaled on their boat. Jerry Ortega returns to reveal that the couple witnessed the crash of "Black Unicorn", a Chinese stealth satellite. Later, a Chinese Ministry of State Security agent confronts Jerry for the satellite schematics, only for him to turn the tables and taser her. The agent, Zi Chen (Elaine Tan) reveals to Five-0 that she was sent to stop her fiance, Quan Lung, who committed the killings and stole a hard drive from the satellite that would compromise U.S. defenses. Later, McGarrett allows for Jerry to live with him after Jerry believes his home was compromised by the Chinese. Meanwhile, Grover takes Clara on a ride-along.
88	17	"Ma Lalo o ka ʻili" "Beneath the Surface"	Bryan Spicer	Story by : Bill Haynes; Teleplay by : Bill Haynes & John Dove	March 14, 2014	417	9.53
The team investigates the apparent murder of school teacher Russell Donovon and the abduction of his daughter Kelly (Conor Leslie). They deduce that the culprit is Tommy Fa'aloa (Booboo Stewart), a troubled young mechanic with a criminal past, and start to believe that Tommy actually rescued Kelly from abuse inflicted by Russell. However, they later realize Kelly was faking the abuse and manipulated Tommy into killing her father to collect his insurance premium. Meanwhile, Danno, with Grace's help, attempts to reconcile his parents. When Jerry finds a polybius square cipher on McGarrett's toolbox, he cracks it as coordinates to a location in Pursat Province, Cambodia. McGarrett is told by CIA agent Sam Connors (James Brennan) that there is a grave in the location.
89	18	"Hoʻi Hou" "Reunited"	Sylvain White	Christina M. Kim	April 4, 2014	418	9.67
Chin Ho and Jerry attend a high school reunion when a classmate, Laura Richmond, is found dead as result of falling onto one of her stiletto heels. Five-0 investigate why she attended the reunion, as she did not attend any of the past ones. They find she paid the medical bills for a Nina Johnson, mother of Cory Johnson, an aspiring surfer who disappeared 25 years ago. It appeared that Laura was seeing Cory while she was in a relationship with another classmate, Alan Lim (Peter Shinkoda). Meanwhile, McGarrett and Danny travel to Cambodia to find the grave has been dug up and the body missing. They do find hair, and McGarrett has Max test the hair for DNA, only for the sample to disappear. McGarrett confronts Agent Connors, who invites him to his office later in the episode. When he returns, McGarrett finds the office deserted. A phone rings and the man on the other end warns McGarrett to discontinue his investigation.
90	19	"Ku I Ka Pili Koko" "Blood Brothers"	Maja Vrvilo	Story by : David Wolkove; Teleplay by : Steven Lilien & Bryan Wynbrandt	April 11, 2014	419	9.17
Running on a tip of a weapons deal from Jason Dekker, Five-0 and Grover's SWAT team race to a parking garage to intercept the deal, only to find the area abandoned. As the team leave, Danny and McGarrett spots a beaten man in a maintenance room, and then the building suddenly explodes, killing the man and trapping the other two. Catherine gets into contact with McGarrett and locates them both, only to learn that rescue workers cannot get to them and Danny and McGarrett must break themselves free. Meanwhile, Chin Ho and Kono learn that Dekker received the tip from a fellow inmate, known as "Spider", after learning the casualty was his brother. They learn that Spider was bribed to tip off Dekker by an unknown party with the intention to target Five-0. The man paying Spider is Edward Cobb (David Gautreaux), a retired CIA agent operating in Southeast Asia with a questionable record. McGarrett uncovers a surprising link between his mother and Wo Fat.
91	20	"Peʻepeʻe Kanaka" "Those Among Us"	Jeff Cadiente	John Dove	April 25, 2014	420	9.26
Pool cleaner Nico Kane is found shot to death. Five-0 believe he walked into a meth lab run by local university students in one of the houses. However, after they find the student responsible, he chooses to jump to his death than get arrested. It is revealed that he and another student, Brian Miller, were radicalized by a wanted Jihadist hiding in Yemen, who is indoctrinating American students. Steve and Danny later visit a military rehabilitation center in San Diego to inform a Marine that they've captured the two terrorists responsible for the attack in Afghanistan that cost four Marines their lives and left the Marine badly injured.
92	21	"Makani ʻolu a holo malie" "Fair Winds and Following Seas"	Jeffrey Hunt	Story by : Peter M. Lenkov & Ken Solarz & Eric Guggenheim; Teleplay by : Eric Guggenheim	May 2, 2014	421	8.77
Five-0 investigate the death of Bruce Paloma, who was transporting a liver to save the life of a patient. The liver is stolen and the team only have 18 hours to find it. They recover it quickly however, and discover the thief was hired by the bosses of Attis, a chemical company that is a target of a lawsuit, to steal the organ who was meant for the lawyer handling the case. Meanwhile, Catherine and McGarrett venture to Afghanistan to find Najib Khan, a boy who is captured by the Taliban. Catherine reveals the seven years before, she was wounded and separated from her group, where she was rescued by Najib's father Amir (Mido Hamada). The couple find Amir wounded in a field, and he reveals that his son was taken by Umar Hassan (Farshad Farahat), a terrorist who was thought to have been killed by American forces. Catherine and McGarrett soon track a convoy and find several captured children, but Najib is not one of them. Furthermore, McGarrett is captured by insurgents with connections to the terrorist ring Five-0 had taken down in the previous episode. Catherine calls Danny for help, who travels to Afghanistan to warn the military of the situation. A team of Navy SEALs find the compound and save McGarrett before he can be executed. McGarrett escapes being court-martialed and is let off with a severe reprimand. Catherine however, chooses to stay in Afghanistan to continue looking for Najib and heads off into the sunset after saying her final goodbyes to a heartbroken Steve. Note: This is the last episode to feature Michelle Borth as a main cast member.
93	22	"O ka PiliʻOhana ka ʻOi" "Family Comes First"	Bryan Spicer	Peter M. Lenkov & Ken Solarz	May 9, 2014	422	9.21
Five-0 hear that Wo Fat has escaped from the supermax prison in Colorado by bombing a hole in the wall to his cell. Furthermore, Doris has visited Wo Fat twice within the month of his escape. Meanwhile, Grover learns that his daughter Samantha (Paige Hurd) is kidnapped by the hacker Ian Wright (Nick Jonas), and is instructed to steal SWAT gear for a gang of mercenaries to steal $100 million of confiscated drug money to be used for Third World development that Five-0 is transporting. Desperate to save Samantha, Grover decides to walk into the compound carrying a bomb and threatening to detonate it if he is not given the money. Grover receives a call and hears that Samantha has been released, and Ian was murdered by Wo Fat, before releasing Samantha to relay a message to McGarrett that the two should talk soon. For his actions, Grover is forced to take early retirement from the Honolulu Police Department, but later accepts McGarrett's offer to join the Five-0 task force.

== Production ==
=== Development ===
On March 27, 2013, while the third season was still airing, CBS renewed Hawaii Five-0 for a fourth season. When CBS announced its fall schedule for the 2013-14 television season it was revealed that the series would undergo a time slot change moving from Monday nights at 10 PM ET to Friday nights at 9 PM ET. The season premiere aired on September 27, 2013. For the fourth season production of the series moved to a sound stage at Diamond Head Film Studios where the original Hawaii Five-O and Magnum, P.I. as well as Lost previously filmed at. Filming on the season began on July 9, 2013 with a traditional Hawaiian blessing. On October 11, 2013, it was announced that the show was planning a "fan built episode." Fans and viewers of the series were able to vote on several plot elements of the show including the scene of the crime, the victim, the murder weapon, the suspect, and the scene of the takedown. Once production began fans were also able to vote for additional elements such as props, cast wardrobe, music, and the episode title. The episode aired as the season's eighteenth episode on April 4, 2014.

=== Casting ===
On June 14, 2013, it was announced that Jorge Garcia would guest star in an episode early on in the season. It was also announced that Chi McBride had been cast in a guest role to play character from the original series, Captain Lou Grover; with the possibility of the role to later become recurring. Tim Daly was confirmed to be guest starring in an episode as a Texas Ranger also with the possibility for the role to become recurring. It was reported that Henry Ian Cusick would guest star in the season's premiere episode as a character called Ernesto, a member of a terrorist group called the National Liberation Movement. Nick Jonas also guest starred in one episode as computer hacker Ian Wright. After appearing in multiple episodes as a recurring character it was revealed that McBride would be upped to a series regular for the remainder of the season. McBride began receiving main billing in the tenth episode of the season, "Hoʻonani Makuakane". Jonas later reprised his role once again in the season finale. Mark Dacascos also reprised his role as Wo Fat in the seasons premiere and finale episodes. Garcia quickly became a recurring character when he appeared in three more episodes later in the season. Due to the popularity of his character he was subsequently upgraded to a series regular beginning with the fifth season. On March 27, 2014 it was announced that Michelle Borth would depart the series at the end of the season. She made her final appearance as a series regular in the seasons penultimate episode. Borth has continued to make guest appearances in all subsequent seasons including a recurring role early in the sixth season.

== Reception ==
=== Ratings ===
No.	Episode	Air date	18-49 rating	Viewers (millions)	Weekly rank	Live+7 18-49	Live+7 viewers (millions)
1	"Aloha kekahi i kekahi"	September 27, 2013	1.6	9.46	#25	2.4	12.63
2	"ʻAʻale Maʻa Wau"	October 4, 2013	1.5	9.75	#22	2.4	12.91
3	"Kaʻoia Iʻo Ma Loko"	October 11, 2013	1.5	9.24	#21	N/A	12.32
4	"A ia la aku"	October 18, 2013	1.4	8.81	N/A	2.3	12.22
5	"Kupuʻeu"	October 25, 2013	1.4	9.46	#24	2.3	12.71
6	"Kupouli ʻla"	November 1, 2013	1.3	9.71	#17	2.3	13.08
7	"Ua Nalohia"	November 8, 2013	1.4	9.51	#20	2.3	12.85
8	"Akanahe"	November 15, 2013	1.6	9.90	#19	N/A	12.88
9	"Hauʻoli La HoʻomaikaʻI"	November 22, 2013	1.5	9.92	#21	2.4	13.47
10	"Hoʻonani Makuakane"	December 13, 2013	1.2	9.13	#20	2.2	12.81
11	"Pukana"	December 20, 2013	1.3	9.62	#11	2.2	12.78
12	"O kela me keia Manama"	January 10, 2014	1.6	10.74	#10	2.4	13.76
13	"Hana Lokomaikaʻi"	January 17, 2014	1.5	10.63	#11	N/A	13.70
14	"Na hala a ka makua"	January 31, 2014	1.8	11.24	#12	2.6	14.47
15	"Pale ʻla"	February 28, 2014	1.4	10.61	#15	2.4	14.06
16	"Hoku Welowelo"	March 7, 2014	1.4	10.35	#15	2.3	13.68
17	"Ma lalo o ka ʻili"	March 14, 2014	1.4	9.53	#17	N/A	12.45
18	"Hoʻi Hou"	April 4, 2014	1.4	9.67	#16	2.3	13.03
19	"Ku I Ka Pili Koko"	April 11, 2014	1.3	9.17	#17	2.3	12.54
20	"Peʻepeʻe Kainaka"	April 25, 2014	1.3	9.26	#16	2.0	12.30
21	"Makani ʻolu a holo malie"	May 2, 2014	1.2	8.77	#20	2.0	11.85
22	"O ka PiliʻOhana ka ʻOi"	May 9, 2014	1.3	9.21	#13	2.0	11.93

== Home video release ==
Hawaii Five-0: The Fourth Season
Set details			Special features
22 episodes; 6-disc set; 1.78:1 aspect ratio; Languages: English (Dolby Digital 5.1, with subtitles); Subtitles in English, Spanish, and Portuguese; Audio commentaries on select episodes.			Shore Lines: Season 4; Aloha Action! Season 4; Designing Five-0; A Celebration Like No Other; The Making Of "Ho'onani Makuakane" ("Honor Thy Father"); Plan Of Attack; Captain Lou Grover; King's Oh So Sweet Hawaiian Recipes; From The Fans To The Fans; Deleted Scenes; Gag Reel
Release Dates			Shore Lines: Season 4; Aloha Action! Season 4; Designing Five-0; A Celebration Like No Other; The Making Of "Ho'onani Makuakane" ("Honor Thy Father"); Plan Of Attack; Captain Lou Grover; King's Oh So Sweet Hawaiian Recipes; From The Fans To The Fans; Deleted Scenes; Gag Reel
Region 1	Region 2	Region 4	Shore Lines: Season 4; Aloha Action! Season 4; Designing Five-0; A Celebration Like No Other; The Making Of "Ho'onani Makuakane" ("Honor Thy Father"); Plan Of Attack; Captain Lou Grover; King's Oh So Sweet Hawaiian Recipes; From The Fans To The Fans; Deleted Scenes; Gag Reel
September 16, 2014	September 15, 2014	January 28, 2015	Shore Lines: Season 4; Aloha Action! Season 4; Designing Five-0; A Celebration Like No Other; The Making Of "Ho'onani Makuakane" ("Honor Thy Father"); Plan Of Attack; Captain Lou Grover; King's Oh So Sweet Hawaiian Recipes; From The Fans To The Fans; Deleted Scenes; Gag Reel
