= James Butler (sprinter) =

American former track and field sprinter

James Butler (born June 21, 1960) is an American former track and field sprinter who specialized in the 200-meter dash. He was an NCAA champion and winner at the Liberty Bell Classic Olympic boycott event. He represented the United States at the 1987 IAAF World Indoor Championships and placed fifth. He set a 200 m best of 20.23 seconds in 1982.

== College ==
Collegiately he ran for Oklahoma State University and was the school's first ever winner of the 200-meter dash at the NCAA Men's Division I Outdoor Track and Field Championships, doing so in 1982 with a wind-assisted run of 20.07 seconds.

== Olympics ==
Internationally he looked set to make his Olympic debut with a win at the 1980 United States Olympic Trials, but did not compete due to the U.S. Olympic Committee's boycott of the 1980 Summer Olympics in Moscow, Russia. He was one of 461 athletes to receive a Congressional Gold Medal instead. He ran at the Liberty Bell Classic, an alternative meet for boycotting nations held in Philadelphia. He won the 200 m there, edging fellow American Fred Taylor by one hundredth of a second.

== USA Outdoor Track and Field ==
Butler ran his lifetime personal record for the 200 m in 1982, crossing the line in Provo, Utah in 20.23 seconds. This ranked him as the fourth fastest athlete in the world that year. He was runner-up at the 1982 USA Outdoor Track and Field Championships to Calvin Smith. At the end of that year he won the top level Golden Gala meet in Rome. His season's best in 1983 came at the national championships, but the quality of the field had improved given that it was the selection meet for the inaugural 1983 World Championships in Athletics and he ended the race in sixth place.

== International ==
Butler continued to run on the international circuit and was the world's eighth best 200 m sprinter in 1984 with a time of 20.31 seconds set in Rome. In his sole world level outing for the United States, he came fifth at the 1987 IAAF World Indoor Championships. He also placed third at the 1987 IAAF Grand Prix Final. In his final year of top level competition, in 1988, he set indoor bests of 6.55 seconds for the 60-meter dash and 20.64 seconds for the indoor 200 m – the latter time made him the third best runner indoors that season. He competed as a guest athlete at the Hungarian Indoor Championships and won their 60 m event. He ended his career after a failed attempt to qualify for the 1988 Olympics, as he took sixth at the 1988 United States Olympic Trials.

== Personal records ==
- 100 metres – 10.14 (1982)
- 200 metres – 20.23 (1982)

Indoors

- 50 metres – 5.74 (1983)
- 55 metres – 6.11 (1983)
- 60 metres – 6.55 (1988)
- 200 metres – 20.64 (1988)
- 300 metres – 32.92 (1986)
- 400 metres – 46.79 (1988)
- All info from All-Athletics
