= Gwen Gardner =

American sprinter

Gwen Gardner (born September 7, 1960) is an American female track and field sprinter who specialized in the 400-meter dash. An African-American, she grew up in Los Angeles, California. Collegiately she competed for the UNLV Rebels and was among their best sprinters in the mid-1980s.

Gardner looked to be a key figure for the United States track team after a runner-up finish to Sherri Howard in the 400 m at the 1980 United States Olympic Trials, but the boycott of the 1980 Summer Olympics meant she ultimately did not compete in Moscow. The Liberty Bell Classic was organised for the boycotting nations and Gardner topped the field at this event, winning in 52.04 seconds ahead of Canada's Charmaine Crooks. She also placed third in the 400 m at the 1980 USA Outdoor Track and Field Championships, held separately that year. Gardner was one of 461 Olympic athletes to receive a Congressional Gold Medal.
