= Hassan El Kashief =

Sudanese sprinter

Personal information
- Nationality: Sudanese
- Born: 26 March 1956 (age 70)
- Height: 175 cm (5 ft 9 in)
- Weight: 68 kg (150 lb)

Sport
- Sport: Athletics
- Event: 400m
Medal record
Men's athletics
Representing Sudan
African Championships
Gold medal – first place	1979 Dakar	400 m
Bronze medal – third place	1984 Rabat	400 m

Hassan El-Kasheef (Arabic: حسن الكشيف; born 26 March 1956) is a retired Sudanese athlete who competed in the sprints distances. He competed in the men's 400 metres at the 1984 Summer Olympics.

El-Kasheef won the British AAA Championships title in the 400 metres event at the 1979 AAA Championships.

== International competitions ==
Year	Competition	Venue	Position	Event	Notes
Representing Sudan
1978	All-Africa Games	Algiers, Algeria	1st	200 m	20.77s
1978	All-Africa Games	Algiers, Algeria	1st	400 m	45.32s
1979	African Championships	Dakar, Senegal	1st	400 m	45.34s
1980	Liberty Bell Classic	Philadelphia	2nd	400 m	45.60s
1984	African Championships	Rabat, Morocco	3rd	400 m	46.47s
