= Greg Duhaime =

Personal information
- Born: August 11, 1953
- Died: October 28, 1992 (aged 39)

Greg Duhaime (August 11, 1953 – October 28, 1992) was a Canadian track and field athlete and one-time Canadian record holder in the 3000 metres steeplechase. He was born in Espanola, Ontario.

Duhaime is a four-time Canadian champion in the men's 3000 m steeplechase (1980-1982 and 1984), and a one-time national champion in the men's 5000 metres (1980).

Duhaime was one of many athletes to not compete in the 1980 Summer Olympics because of the 1980 Summer Olympics boycott against Moscow, they participated in the Liberty Bell Classic (an alternative meet for the Olympic Boycott) in Philadelphia instead. He won a bronze medal at the 1982 Commonwealth Games in the steeplechase. Duhaime was gay, and one of only a handful of openly gay Olympians at the time. He died of AIDS in 1992.

== International competitions ==
Year	Competition	Venue	Position	Notes
Representing Canada
1980	Liberty Bell Classic	Philadelphia, United States	3rd	5000m
1982	Commonwealth Games	Brisbane, Australia	3rd	3000m Steeple
1983	Pan American Games	Caracas, Venezuela	3rd	3000m Steeple
1984	Olympic Games	Los Angeles, United States	16th	3000m Steeple

== See also ==
- Homosexuality in sports
- Politics and sports
