= Leann Warren =

American middle-distance runner

Personal information
- Nationality: American
- Born: March 2, 1961 (age 65) Corvallis, Oregon, United States

Sport
- Country: United States
- Sport: Track, Cross Country
- Events: 800 m, 1500m
- College team: Oregon
Medal record
Representing United States
Women's Athletics
Summer Universiade
Silver medal – second place	1981 Bucharest	4 x 400 meters
Pacific Conference Games
Gold medal – first place	1981 Christchurch	800 meters

Leann Warren (born March 2, 1961) is a retired middle-distance runner who specialized in the 800 and 1500 meters and cross country. As an athlete at the University of Oregon, she won three individual track national championships and was part of team championships in cross country and track.

== Athletic career ==
Born in Corvallis, Oregon, Warren starred as a high school track athlete at Crescent Valley High School, where she won three state championships at 400 and 800 meters. She also was the point guard for Crescent Valley's 1978 state championship basketball team.

Warren continued her career at the University of Oregon where she ran both track and cross country. She just missed making the Olympic team, finishing third in the 1500 meters at 1980 U.S. Olympic trials.

At the 1980 AIAW Outdoor Track and Field Championships, Warren and teammates Melanie Batiste, Rhonda Massey and Grace Bakari won the mile relay and she finished second in the 800 meters. The next year, in 1981 championships, Warren won both the 800 and 1500 meter events and won the Honda Sports Award for her achievements. That same year, she finished second in the 1981 NCAA Division I cross country championships and won the inaugural Fifth Avenue Mile in New York City in 4:25.

She repeated as champion in the 1500 meters at the 1982 NCAA Division I Outdoor Track and Field Championships. After taking some time off due to injury, she returned in track in 1985, where her strong performances in the 800 and 1500 meters helped the Ducks win their first-ever women's track and field championship at the 1985 NCAA Division I Outdoor Track and Field Championships.

== After running and legacy ==
Warren's hard training led to injuries and she retired from running in 1987. She moved to Portland, Oregon and became a competitive cyclist and radio personality.

Warren was inducted into the Oregon Sports Hall of Fame in 2015. In 2026, she was inducted into the U.S. Track & Field and Cross Country Coaches Association Hall of Fame.
