= Jeanette Bolden =

American Olympic athlete

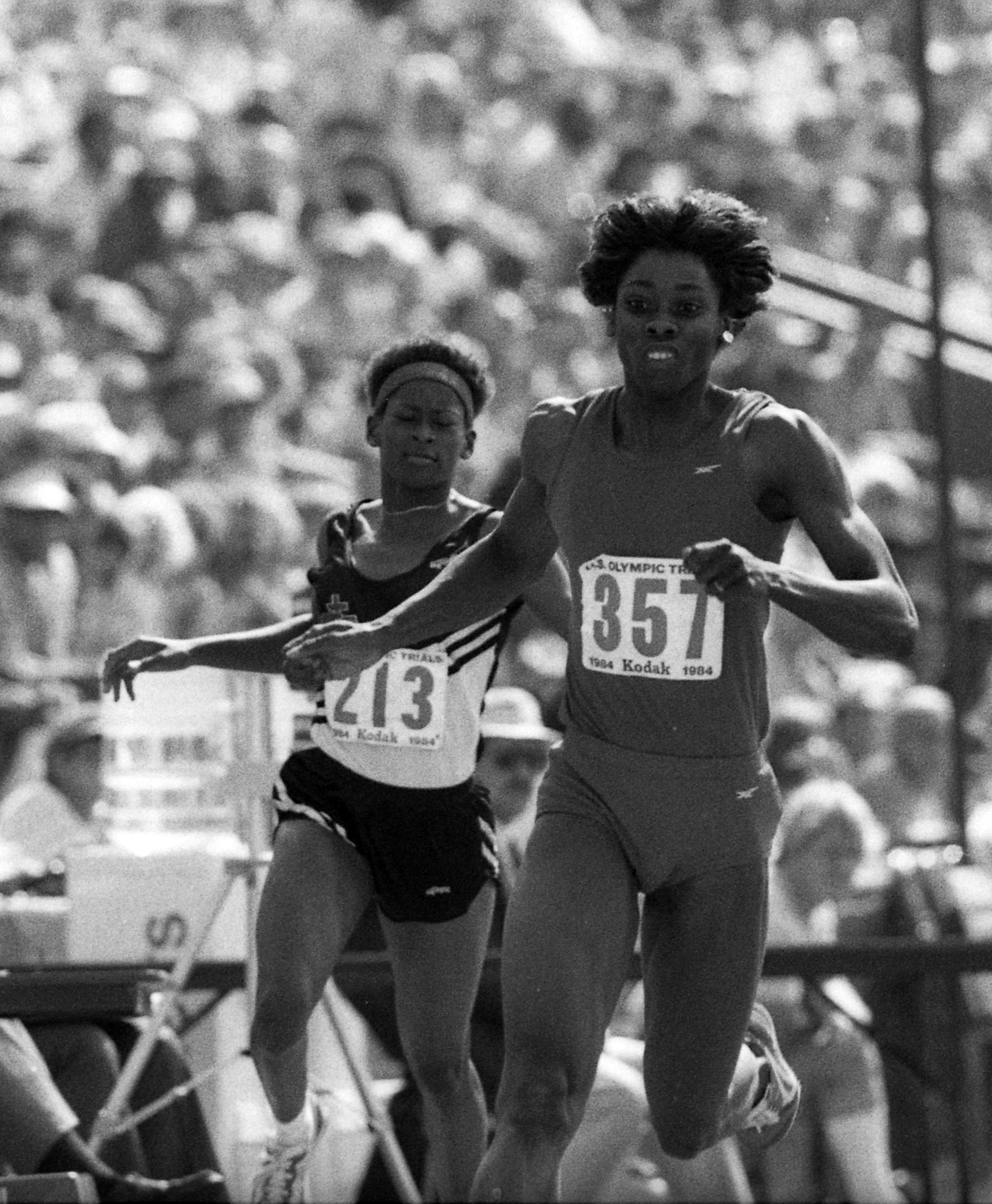
- Bolden (#357) at the 1984 U.S. Olympic trials

Personal information
- Born: January 26, 1960 (age 66) Los Angeles, California, U.S.
Medal record
Women's athletics
Representing the United States
Olympic Games
Gold medal – first place	1984 Los Angeles	4 × 100 metres relay
Olympic Boycott Games
Silver medal – second place	1980 Philadelphia	100 m

Jeanette Bolden (born January 26, 1960) is an American Olympic athlete who formerly competed in the 100 metres. She was the head coach of the track and field team at the University of Central Florida. She is the co-owner of the 27th Street Bakery in Los Angeles, which is best known for the sweet potato, pecan and sweet potato pecan pies.

== World class sprinter ==
She competed for the United States in the 1984 Summer Olympics held in Los Angeles, U.S. in the 4 × 100 metres where she won the gold medal with her teammates 100 metre silver medalist Alice Brown, Chandra Cheeseborough and Olympic 100m champion Evelyn Ashford. She also placed 4th in the 100 metres in a time of 11.25 seconds.

Bolden has suffered from asthma throughout her life. Her athletic career came to a sudden end at the 1988 Olympic Trials when she ruptured her Achilles tendon just moments after teammate Florence Griffith Joyner set the still standing World Record in the 100 metres. It was one of the most heartbreaking memories for her coach Bob Kersee.

Bolden attended college at California State University, Northridge and later transferred to UCLA where she graduated in 1983.

== Assistant coach ==
Unable to run with the same intensity as before, she applied her efforts to coaching, initially as an assistant coach at UCLA under Kersee. Between 1994 and 2012, Coach Bolden developed over 50 UCLA NCAA All-Americans in the sprints, hurdles and relays.

== Head coach ==
Bolden was the head track and field coach for UCF after a successful tenure with UCLA's women's program. She retired at the end 2017. In 2008, she served as the United States Olympic women's head coach.

== Honors ==
Bolden was inducted into the UCLA Athletics Hall of Fame as a member of the 2022 class.
