= Fred Dixon (athlete) =

American decathlete

Personal information
- Born: November 5, 1949 (age 76) Los Angeles, California, United States

Sport
- Sport: Athletics
- Event: Decathlon
Medal record
Men's athletics
Representing the United States
Pan American Games
Silver medal – second place	1975 Mexico City	Decathlon

Fred Dixon (born November 5, 1949) is an American athlete. He competed in the men's decathlon at the 1976 Summer Olympics. While Dixon had hopes of a medal, he was injured during his flight of the 110 metres hurdles. Dixon struggled to continue but after a no height in the pole vault, he finished in 23rd place.

Dixon competed for the Cal State Los Angeles Golden Eagles track and field team in the NCAA.

Dixon finished in second place at the 1975 Pan American Games, behind American rival Bruce Jenner. His 1977 score of 8,397, set in the dual meet against the Soviet Union in Bloomington, Indiana gave him, at the time, the sixth best decathlon score in history behind Olympic champions Jenner, Mykola Avilov and Bill Toomey, plus Guido Kratschmer and Aleksandr Grebenyuk. He was ranked in the world top 10 four years in a row, 1974-7, achieving #2 in 1975 behind Jenner and in 1977 behind Grebenyuk. He finished in third place at the 1980 US Olympic Trials, which would have qualified him to another Olympics, except for the 1980 Summer Olympics boycott.

Dixon appeared in a reunion with Jenner on an episode of Keeping up with the Kardashians before Jenner had transitioned to Caitlyn Jenner. After Jenner's transition he was asked to comment:

"Bruce was one of the best athletes who ever existed. Now, to see that photo ... somehow it doesn't compute." "I look at it and I don't understand it. I'm not in any way judging him ... but it's very different." "The soul that was and is Bruce Jenner is still my friend. I don't understand what's going on now ... but he's still my friend."

— Fred Dixon
