= Dedy Cooper =

American hurdler

Personal information
- Born: May 22, 1956 (age 70) Richmond, California, United States

Sport
- Sport: Track and field

Dedy Cooper (born May 22, 1956) is a retired American track and field athlete, known for specializing in the hurdles.

== Early life ==
While running for Harry Ells High School in Richmond, California, Cooper led his team to the team title at the 1975 CIF California State Meet. In the process, Cooper tied the National High School record in the 120 yard hurdles at 13.2 in the semi-finals. That record was later surpassed by Nehemiah, which remains the record. Running for San Jose State University, he was the 1976 NCAA Outdoor Champion.

== Athletics ==
He held the world indoor record in the 60 meter high hurdles at 7.54, set in 1977. He was ranked in the top 10 in the world in the 110 metres hurdles six years in a row starting in 1976, rising to number 3 in the world in 1981. He qualified for the ill-fated United States Olympic team in 1980 by finishing second to Renaldo Nehemiah in the United States Olympic Trials, but did not get to run in the Olympics due to the 1980 Summer Olympics boycott. He did however receive one of 461 Congressional Gold Medals created especially for the spurned athletes.
