= Laurie Kern =

Canadian javelin thrower (born 1957)

Personal information
- Born: 6 February 1957 (age 69) Richmond, British Columbia, Canada

Sport
- Sport: Track and field
Medal record
Representing Canada
Commonwealth Games
Bronze medal – third place	1978 Edmonton	Javelin throw

Laurie Kern (born 6 February 1957) is a Canadian female former track and field athlete who competed in the javelin throw. She was a bronze medallist at the 1978 Commonwealth Games, held in Canada, and the winner at the Liberty Bell Classic in 1980 (an event held as an alternative to the Olympics due to a boycott). She was a three-time national javelin champion.

Raised in Richmond, British Columbia, she took part in javelin from a young age, breaking all club records at the local Kajaks track and field club.

She twice represented Canada at the Pan American Games, finishing fourth at both the 1975 and 1979 events.

== International competitions ==
Year	Competition	Venue	Position	Notes
1975	Pan American Games	Mexico City, Mexico	4th	48.40 m
1978	Commonwealth Games	Edmonton, Alberta, Canada	3rd	53.60 m
1979	Pan American Games	San Juan, Puerto Rico	4th	55.70 m
1980	Liberty Bell Classic	Philadelphia, United States	1st	57.42 m

== National titles ==
- Canadian Track and Field Championships
  - Javelin throw: 1973, 1979, 1980
