= Daniel O'Connor (athlete) =

American racewalker

Personal information
- Nationality: American
- Born: March 29, 1952 (age 74)

Sport
- Sport: Athletics
- Event: Racewalking

Daniel O'Connor (born March 29, 1952) is an American racewalker. He competed in the men's 20 kilometres walk at the 1984 Summer Olympics.
