= Brigitte Reid =

Canadian high jumper

Personal information
- Nationality: Canadian
- Born: 22 September 1955 Weddinghofen, Germany
- Died: 2 February 2026 (aged 70) London, Ontario, Canada
- Height: 1.77 m (5 ft 10 in)
- Weight: 61 kg (134 lb)

Sport
- Sport: Athletics
- Event: High jump

Brigitte Reid (née Bittner; 22 September 1955 – 2 February 2026) was a German-born Canadian athlete. She competed in the women's high jump at the 1984 Summer Olympics.
