= Karen Hawkins (athlete) =

American former track and field sprinter (born 1957)

Medal record

Women's athletics

Representing United States

Pan American Games
Gold medal – first place	1979 San Juan	4×100 m relay

USA Outdoor Championships
Gold medal – first place	1980	200 m
Bronze medal – third place	1980	100 m

Karen Hawkins (born July 20, 1957) is an American former track and field sprinter.

Hawkins was a member of the winning 4 × 100 m relay team at the 1979 Pan American Games. She won the 200 metres at the 1980 USA Outdoor Track and Field Championships, with a time of 22.80 seconds (wind-aided), and finished third in the 100 metres. She placed second in the 1980 Olympic Trials 200 metres.

Her personal best time in the 200 metres was 22.76 seconds, run in 1980.
