= Don Paige =

American middle-distance runner

Personal information
- Born: October 13, 1956 (age 70) Baldwinsville, New York, U.S.
Medal record
Men's Athletics
Representing the United States
Pan American Games
Gold medal – first place	1979 San Juan	1500 metres
Olympic Boycott Games
Gold medal – first place	1980 Philadelphia	800 metres

Donald J. Paige (born October 13, 1956) is an American retired middle-distance runner.

== Track career ==
In 1979, while a student at Villanova University, Paige ran an indoor American Record of 2:20.3 for 1000m and a few months later ran a personal best of 3:54.6 for the mile. In June he pulled off a rare 800m/1500m double at the NCAA championships, becoming only the third man to win both events after Ron Delany (1958) and Ross Hume (1945). (In the 800, run only 35 minutes after the 1500m final, he ran a rare negative split race of 54.3/51.9, while in the 1500 he closed his last lap in a swift 53.7, the last 200 being covered in 26.2 seconds.) Two weeks later Paige ran a personal best for the 1500 of 3:37.4, good for 10th place on the all-time U.S. list at that time, in finishing second to Steve Scott at the AAU championships. 1979 culminated with him winning the 1500 meters title at the Pan American Games.

In 1980, Paige won the 800 at the USA Olympic Trials on 23 June 1980 in Eugene, Oregon, but could not participate at the 1980 Olympic Games in Moscow because of the U.S.-led boycott. Paige did however receive one of 461 Congressional Gold Medals created specifically for the qualified athletes. In the race he set the world best year performance in the men's 800 metres in 1980 at 1:44.53 U.S. After the 1980 Olympics, he defeated the 800 meter Olympic silver medalist and world record holder Sebastian Coe by 0.03 seconds in an 800-meter race in Via Reggio, Italy, and was later ranked number one in the world for the 800m in 1980 by Track & Field News magazine. As some small consolation for missing the Olympics, he also won the 800 m at the Olympic Boycott Games.

His personal best in the same event came three years later: 1:44.29, achieved on 4 September 1983 in Rieti, Lazio, Italy.

Paige ran 3:54.19, his lifetime best for the mile, on May 16, 1982.

In 1984, Paige failed to qualify for the Olympics finishing fifth in the 800 m final at the Olympic Trials.

== Early life ==
Paige was born in New York state, where he attended Charles W. Baker High School in Baldwinsville (near Syracuse), then attended Villanova University from where he graduated in 1980 with a degree in Business Administration in Finance. He was then awarded an NCAA Post-Graduate Scholarship, and attended for 1 year Drexel University's MBA program.

As well as a student athlete, Paige was also from 1981 to 1984 Assistant Track Coach for Middle Distances at Villanova University. Paige was honored in 1997 for his outstanding achievements as a middle-distance runner at Villanova including winning two NCAA Outdoor individual titles in the 800m (1979–80) and one at 1500m (1979), and at the indoor NCAA Championships three 1000y titles (1978–80). During his time at Villanova, Paige was coached by their legendary track coach Jumbo Elliott, and considered himself a graduate of the 'Jumbo Elliott' system like other Villanova track greats like Marty Liquori and Eamonn Coghlan. At Villanova, Paige also met his wife, Carolyn.

After graduating from Vilanova, Paige ran for Marty Liquori's Athletic Attic track team.

== Later life ==
Since retiring from athletics, Paige has worked on the design of track and field facilities, as owner of his own consultancy company.

Looking back at the Olympic boycott, Paige has no lingering ill-feeling, in fact he is reported as saying he understood and supported President Carter's decision, even writing an article explaining his reasons for his school newspaper. His main regret, he has stated, was not getting the chance of 'walking in the opening ceremonies with all of those athletes from around the world'.

On his victory over Seb Coe after the Olympics, Paige said "I was No. 1 in the world, but Sebastian Coe was a better half-miler than me, I just beat him that day."

== Rankings ==
Paige was ranked among the best in the US and the world in the 800 m over the period 1979 to 1984, according to the votes of the experts of Track and Field News.

Paige also showed early promise as 1500 m runner.

Paige was also ranked no. 1 at 1000 y/1000 m in the US for five consecutive years.

800 meters
Year	World rank	US rank
1978	-	-
1979	7th	2nd
1980	1st	1st
1981	-	-
1982	-	-
1983	-	4th
1984	-	5th

1500 meters
Year	World rank	US rank
1978	-	4th
1979	7th	2nd
1980	-	6th
1981	-	-
1982	-	10th
1983	-	-
1984	-	-
