= Harvey Glance =

American sprinter (1957–2023)

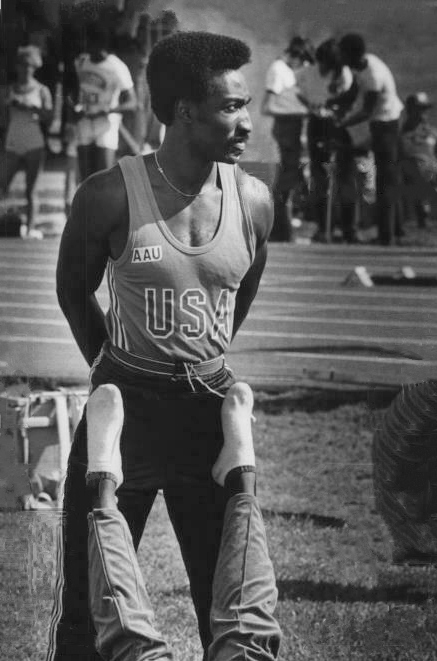
- Glance in 1980

Personal information
- Full name: Harvey Edward Glance
- Nationality: American
- Born: March 28, 1957 Phenix City, Alabama, U.S.
- Died: June 13, 2023 (aged 66) Mesa, Arizona, U.S.
- Height: 5 ft 8 in (173 cm)
- Weight: 150 lb (68 kg)

Sport
- Sport: Athletics
- Events: Sprint, long jump
- College team: Auburn Tigers

Achievements and titles
- Personal bests: 100 yd – 9.4 (1975); 100 m – 10.05 (1985); 200 m – 20.25 (1983); LJ – 7.87 m (1977)
Medal record
Representing the United States
Olympic Games
Gold medal – first place	1976 Montreal	4 × 100 m relay
World Championships
Gold medal – first place	1987 Rome	4 × 100 m relay
Pan American Games
Gold medal – first place	1979 San Juan	4 × 100 m relay
Gold medal – first place	1987 Indianapolis	4 × 100 m relay
Silver medal – second place	1979 San Juan	100 m
Olympic Boycott Games
Gold medal – first place	1980 Philadelphia	4 × 100 m relay
Silver medal – second place	1980 Philadelphia	100 metres
World Cup
Gold medal – first place	1985 Canberra	4 × 100 m relay
Summer Universiade
Bronze medal – third place	1977 Sofia	4 x 100 m relay

Harvey Edward Glance (March 28, 1957 – June 12, 2023) was an American sprint runner. He won gold medals in tandem with his teammates at the 4 × 100 m relay at the 1976 Summer Olympics, 1979 and 1987 Pan American Games, and 1987 World Championships.

== Track and field career ==
Glance equaled the then 100 m world record of 9.9 twice in 1976: first on April 3 in Columbia, South Carolina and then a month later in Baton Rouge, Louisiana. As an Auburn University student, Glance won the NCAA 100 m championships in 1976 and 1977 and 200 m championships in 1976. Glance was the first freshman to win the 100m title after the NCAA started using metrics instead of yards. In 1976, he also recorded the automatic timings of 10.12 s and 10.11 s that were world junior records for 100 m. (Note: Junior athletes are those athletes who are 18 or 19 years of age on December 31 of the year of competition.) (Note: Automatic timings only were official from January 1, 1977.)

Glance finished first in the 100 m at the 1976 U.S. Olympic Trials. At the 1976 Montreal Olympics, Glance was a disappointing fourth in 100 m, as the United States failed to win a medal in the event. He then ran the opening leg in the gold medal-winning American 4 × 100 m relay team. At the 1979 Pan American Games, Glance was second in 100 m and won the gold medal as a member of American 4 × 100 m relay team. He was also second in 4 × 100 m relay at the 1979 Athletics World Cup. Glance was also in line to replace James Sanford in the individual 100 m race if Sanford had not recovered in time from a muscle injury.

Glance again qualified for the team for the Olympic team for the 1980 Moscow Olympics, finishing second in the 100 m. However, due to the boycott, he did not compete at the Olympics but competed in the Liberty Bell Classic (Olympic Boycott Games) instead, winning silver in the 100 m and gold in the relay. He was a recipient of one of 461 Congressional Gold Medals created especially for the spurned athletes.

== Track coach career ==
Glance worked first as assistant coach at Auburn University (1990–91) and then became their head coach.

In 1997, he became head Men's track and field coach at the University of Alabama. While there, he established the 'Crimson Tide' as one of the USA's best college teams, and was able to attract many top athletes to the university including Kirani James (World 400 m champion in 2011 and Olympic 400 m champion in 2012).

At the national level, Glance assumed the following roles:

- 1994 – World Junior Team in Lisbon, Portugal;
- 1997 – World University Games in Sicily, Italy;
- 1999 – Pan American Games in Winnipeg, Canada;
- 2003 – assistant coach for Team USA at the 2003 World Championships in Paris, France;
- 2006 – World junior Team in Beijing, China;
- 2008 – assistant coach for Team USA at the 2008 Olympic Games;
- 2009 – men's head coach for Team USA at the 2009 World Championships in Berlin, Germany.

In recognition of his achievements, in 1996 he was inducted into the Alabama Sports Hall of Fame, and, most notably, he received in 2008 the Congressional Gold Medal of Freedom.

In April 2011, Glance announced he was to retire from his role at Alabama at the end of the season. Following his retirement, Glance continued to work as the personal coach of Kirani James, assisting in his journey to become an Olympic champion.

== Personal life ==
Glance was born in Phenix City, Alabama, the son of Wheeler and Ella Glance, and was educated at Central High School in Phenix City. There he was mentored in track by coach Joe Henderson, who had recognized Glance's special talent.

After high school, he earned a degree in Health & Human Performance at Auburn University.

Glance always recognized his potential as a coach and volunteered to work as one in Arizona whilst still an athlete. Always aware of the importance of public relations and civic responsibility, Glance was a regular visitor as a student to a veterans hospital and was selected as one of five student-athletes from the 1976 Olympics team to be invited to an NCAA Honors Luncheon with the President of the United States. His coach, Mel Rosen, was proud to state "Harvey's what I call world-class – as an athlete and as a man."

Glance died of cardiac arrest at a hospital in Mesa, Arizona, on June 12, 2023, at age 66.

== Rankings ==
Glance was ranked among the best in the U.S. and the world in both the 100 and 200 m sprint events over the incredible spread of 12 seasons from 1976 to 1987, according to the votes of the experts of Track & Field News.

100 meters
Year	World rank	US rank
1976	4th	1st
1977	–	6th
1978	–	5th
1979	3rd	2nd
1980	6th	4th
1981	–	–
1982	–	–
1983	–	–
1984	7th	6th
1985	–	–
1986	7th	3rd
1987	–	6th

200 meters
Year	World rank	US rank
1976	7th	4th
1977	–	10th
1978	10th	5th

== Notes ==
Records
Preceded by (United States) Ronnie Ray Smith	Men's World Junior Record Holder, 100 metres June 20, 1976 – July 30, 1978	Succeeded by (United States) Mel Lattany
