= Franklin Jacobs =

American high jumper (born 1957)

Personal information
- Nationality: American
- Born: December 30, 1957 (age 68)

Sport
- Country: United States
- Sport: Athletics
- Event: High jump

Achievements and titles
- Personal best: High jump: 2.32 m (1978)

Franklin Jacobs (born December 30, 1957 ) is a former high jumper from the United States. His personal best of 2.32 meters (7 ft 7 1/4 in) was a world indoor record in 1978, and at 59 centimeters (23 in) above Jacobs' own height of 1.73 meters (5 ft 8 in), it remains the record for height differential, now held jointly with Stefan Holm.

== Biography ==
Jacobs was one of ten children of Jannie Jacobs, living in a shack in Mullins, South Carolina. His parents separated when he was young. The impoverished family moved to Paterson, New Jersey when he was three and lived with four cousins. His first love was basketball, and he played for Paterson East-side High. He only started high jumping in his senior year, after the end of the basketball season. He cleared 6 feet 8 inches (2.03 m) that year. His natural talent overcame his lack of technique: he called his style the "Jacobs Slop", as opposed to the Fosbury Flop; but later renamed it the "Slope", from the trajectory of his launch.

Jacobs barely graduated high school and got no athletic scholarship, but enrolled at Fairleigh Dickinson University in Teaneck, New Jersey with a federal grant. He cleared 7 feet 1 inch (2.16 m) in his freshman year. In March 1977 he tore cartilage in his right leg playing basketball, but competed for over a year without surgery. He established a rivalry with Dwight Stones over the next two years, with media emphasizing the contrast between Jacobs, a short inner-city African American, and Stones, a tall blond Californian. Stones antagonized Jacobs by criticizing his unorthodox jumping style. Jacobs beat Stones at the 1978 Millrose Games in Madison Square Garden, at which he set a world indoor record of 2.32 meters (7 ft 7 1/4 in). He waived his right to try for an even higher record, saying he "didn't feel nervous enough". Two months later, Vladimir Yashchenko broke the record in Milan. In July, at a highly publicized international between the U.S. and the Soviet Union, Jacobs lost to Yashchenko on countback. In August, Jacobs won the Tanqueray Award for outstanding amateur athlete; by then he had won 27 collegiate events.

Jacobs won the British AAA Championships title at the 1978 AAA Championships.

Jacobs anticipated gaining lucrative endorsements from the 1980 Olympics, but the U.S. boycott of the Games precluded this. He was extremely disappointed and wanted to skip the U.S. "Olympic Trials"; he attended by request of his college, but failed his opening height. He gave up the high jump and did not return to college. A planned return to competition in 1982 did not happen. In 1991, he commented, "I was upset and my dreams were shattered. I probably could have come back in 1984, but I was a naive kid. It was like the floor fell in."

He subsequently had various jobs around Paterson, working for a construction company 1986–91. He married Naomi Livingston c.1990 and had a daughter Shannon in 1992. Around 1995, they moved to Gilbert, Arizona. In 1998 he was working for an electrical installation company. That year, he attended a Millrose Games tribute to stars of memorable previous meets.

== Championship results ==
Year	Tournament	Venue	Result	Height (m)
1977	NCAA Outdoor	Champaign, Illinois	2nd	2.26
1977	US Nationals	Los Angeles, California	2nd	2.27
1978	NCAA Indoor	Detroit, Michigan	1st	2.25 (Note: Officially, 7 ft 5 in; NCAA switched to metric in 1979.)
1978	NCAA Outdoor	Eugene, Oregon	1st	2.26
1978	US Nationals	Los Angeles, California	2nd	2.24
1979	US Nationals	Walnut, California	1st	2.26 (Note: Officially, 7 ft 5 in; USATF switched to metric in 2003.)
1979	Pan American Games	San Juan, Puerto Rico	1st	2.26
1979	World Cup	Montreal, Canada	1st	2.27
1980	NCAA Indoor	Detroit, Michigan	1st	2.24
1980	US Indoor Nationals	New York City	1st	2.24 (Note: Officially, 7 ft 4 1/4 in; USATF switched to metric in 2003.)
1980	US Nationals	Walnut, California	1st	2.24

== See also ==
- Men's high jump indoor world record progression
