= Mel Lattany =

American sprinter

Personal information
- Nationality: United States
- Born: August 10, 1959 (age 66) Brunswick, Georgia, U.S.
- Height: 5 ft 8 3/4 in (1.75 m)
- Weight: 173 lb (78 kg)

Sport
- Sport: Running
- Event(s): 100 metres, 200 metres

Achievements and titles
- Personal best: 100 m: 9.96 s (Athens 1984)
Medal record
Men's athletics
Representing the United States
IAAF World Cup
Gold medal – first place	1981 Rome	200 m
Silver medal – second place	1979 Montreal	4×100 m relay
Summer Universiade
Gold medal – first place	1981 Bucharest	100 m
Liberty Bell Classic
Gold medal – first place	1980 Philadelphia	100 m

Melvin Lattany (born August 10, 1959) is an American former track athlete. He was one of the world's dominating sprinters in the early 1980s.

== Early years ==
Lattany attended Glynn Academy, where he was a standout sprinter in track. He also played football, primarily a wide receiver, but also as a safety, cornerback, punt returner, kickoff returner, and backup placekicker.

He accepted a track scholarship from the University of Georgia, where he established a new Men's World Junior Record over 100 metres on July 30, 1978.

Lattany qualified for the 1980 US Olympic team as a 100 metres sprinter and a member of the 4 × 400 metres relay team, but was unable to compete due to the 1980 Summer Olympics boycott. He did however receive one of 461 Congressional Gold Medals awarded to those athletes affected by the boycott. Lattany was a three-times winner at the British AAA Championships, winning the 100 at the 1981 AAA Championships and the 200 at the 1980 AAA Championships and 1983 AAA Championships.

He won the 100 metres at the 1981 Summer Universiade, and in the 200 metres at the 1981 IAAF World Cup, with a 20.21 seconds finish. On May 5, 1984, Lattany became the fifth man (third at sea level and fourth man from USA) to break the 10-second barrier when he clocked 9.96 seconds in Athens, Georgia.

== Professional career ==
Lattany retired from track in 1985 and signed as a free agent with the Dallas Cowboys of the National Football League on June 20, looking to become an NFL wide receiver as a 25-year-old rookie. At the time, he ran the 40-yard dash in 4.29 seconds. He was released on August 19.

In 1987, he was reinstated by the International Amateur Athletics Federation to run track again.

== Accolades and awards ==
In 2009, Lattany was honored as one of the 20 Athletes of the Century at the Drake Relays (he was never beaten in the 100 m, finals and preliminary races, in the four years he competed there, 1978 to 1981; in addition being named outstanding performer in 1981).

In 2013, Lattany was inducted into the Glynn County Sports Hall of Fame.

== Rankings ==
Lattany was ranked among the best in the US and the world in both the 100 and 200 m sprint events from 1979 to 1984, according to the votes of the experts of Track and Field News.

100 meters
Year	World rank	US rank
1979	-	8th
1980	5th	3rd
1981	2nd	2nd
1982	3rd	3rd
1983	3rd	3rd–
1984	-	8th

200 meters
Year	World rank	US rank
1979	-	8th
1980	–	-
1981	2nd	1st
1982	9th	6th
1983	7th	5th
1984	-	-

Records
Preceded by (United States) Harvey Glance	Men's World Junior Record Holder, 100 metres 30 July 1978 – 24 May 1980	Succeeded by (United States) Stanley Floyd
Achievements
Preceded by (United States) Calvin Smith	Men's season's best performance, 100 metres 1984	Succeeded by (United States) Carl Lewis
