= Bobby Coffman =

American former track and field athlete

Bobby Coffman (born February 17, 1951) is an American former track and field athlete who competed in the decathlon. He set his personal record of 8274 points in Quebec City on August 12, 1979.

Coffman was an All-American for the USC Trojans track and field team, finishing 5th in the decathlon at the 1974 NCAA Division I Outdoor Track and Field Championships.

Coffman competed at two major international events and won gold in both. He first took the decathlon title at the 1979 Pan American Games with a championship record total of 8078 points. The following year he qualified for the 1980 U.S. Olympic team but was unable to compete due to the 1980 Summer Olympics boycott. He did however receive one of 461 Congressional Gold Medals created especially for the spurned athletes. and was the winner of the Olympic boycott games known as the Liberty Bell Classic with a score of 8058 points.

At national level he won at the USA Outdoor Track and Field Championships in both 1979 and 1980, having placed fifth earlier in his career in 1975.

== International competitions ==
Year	Competition	Venue	Position	Notes
1979	Pan American Games	San Juan, Puerto Rico	1st	8078 pts
1980	Liberty Bell Classic	Philadelphia, United States	1st	8058 pts

== National titles ==
- USA Outdoor Track and Field Championships
  - Decathlon: 1979, 1980

== See also ==
- List of decathlon national champions (men)
