= Mike Durkin =

American middle-distance runner

Personal information
- Nationality: American
- Born: April 14, 1953 (age 73)

Sport
- Country: United States
- Sport: Track and Field
- Event: 1500 metres
- College team: Illinois
- Club: Santa Monica Track Club

Mike Durkin (born April 14, 1953) is an American middle-distance runner. He competed in the men's 1500 metres at the 1976 Summer Olympics. He finished 3rd at the 1980 Olympic Trials to qualify for the Olympic team, but was not able to compete due to the 1980 Summer Olympics boycott
