= Tomás Valdemar Hintnaus =

Brazilian pole vaulter and actor

Medal record

Men's athletics

Representing Brazil

Pan American Games
Bronze medal – third place	1983 Caracas	Pole vault

Representing United States

Olympic Boycott Games
Gold medal – first place	1980 Philadelphia	Pole vault

Tomás Valdemar "Tom" Hintnaus (born February 15, 1958) is a retired Brazilian-born pole vaulter, model, and actor. Although he is an American citizen, he represented his native country, Brazil, in the Olympic Games following the American boycott of the 1980 Moscow Olympics.

== Early life ==
He is the son of Czech immigrants, Lubomir and Marianne Hintnaus, who escaped from their home country to West Germany, but were unable to emigrate directly to the United States. As an intermediate stop, they moved first to Brazil, where Tom was born. They moved to the United States in 1960 when he was two.

== Competition ==
Hintnaus attended the now closed Aviation High School in Redondo Beach, California. He won the CIF California State Meet in 1976. Hintnaus competed for the Oregon Ducks track and field team in the NCAA.

As an American citizen, he won the pole vault with a jump of 5.60 m (18 ft 4 1/2 in) at the 1980 United States Olympic Trials, but missed the 1980 Summer Olympics in Moscow due to the American boycott. He rejected an opportunity to represent his native country, Brazil, at the 1980 Olympics; instead, he represented the United States at the Liberty Bell Classic (Olympic Boycott Games), where he won. Hintnaus was one of 461 recipients of a Congressional Gold Medal created especially for the spurned athletes. Hintnaus changed his mind later and joined the Brazilian team in 1983.

For Brazil, he finished fifth at the 1983 World Championships, won the bronze medal at the 1983 Pan American Games, and no-heighted in the final at the 1984 Olympic Games, held less than 12 miles (20 km) from the neighborhood where he grew up.

His personal best was 5.76 metres, achieved in August 1985 in Zürich. This is a former South American record. It was broken by countryfellow Fábio Gomes da Silva in 2007.

== Advertising ==
Hintnaus is also known as the first model in the underwear advertising campaign of designer Calvin Klein. The photograph by Bruce Weber of Hintnaus in white briefs, leaning against a thickly white-washed chimney on Santorini Island in Greece, became the iconic image of "male as sex object" in the 1980s. American Photographer magazine named the photo as one of "10 Pictures That Changed America."

I worked so hard to be the best pole vaulter in the world and I ended up being more well known for putting on a pair of briefs.

== Acting ==
Hintnaus appeared in the Hawaii Five-0 Season 4 episode, "Ha'uoli La Ho'omaika'i" as assassin Dante Barkov. He also appeared in the 1981 slasher film Graduation Day as Pete McFarlin.

== See also ==
- List of male underwear models
