= Bill Green (sprinter) =

American sprinter

Personal information
- Nationality: American
- Born: William Ernest Green; May 1, 1961 Pittsburgh, Pennsylvania
- Died: March 4, 2012 (aged 50) Spokane, Washington
- Height: 6 ft 0 in (1.83 m)
- Weight: 175 lb (79 kg)

Sport
- Sport: Running
- Event: Sprints
Medal record
Men's athletics
Representing the United States
Athletics World Cup
Gold medal – first place	1979 Montreal	4 × 400 m relay

William Ernest Green (May 1, 1961 – March 4, 2012) was an American sprinter.

Green came on the scene at Cubberley High School in Palo Alto, California. As a junior, he won the 1978 CIF California State Meet in the 440 yard dash. The following year he won the 100 yard dash while leading Cubberley team to its only CCS title, just days before the high school was to close forever. While technically still a high schooler, a few weeks later he took third overall at the USA Outdoor Track and Field Championships in 45.51, setting the National High School record in the 400 metres. The record lasted two years until it was surpassed in the same meet by Darrell Robinson. Three days later he found himself running in Europe with the big boys. That season culminated in him winning a gold medal with the United States 4 × 400 metres relay team at the World Cup.

Green then went to the University of Southern California. He still ranks #5 all time in the 400 metres and is tied for 10th in the 200 meters. He joined with James Sanford to be the core of the top relay teams of the 1980s. In 1980 Green won the United States Olympic Trials (while not winning a single preliminary race), to qualify for the Olympic team that never participated, due to the 1980 Summer Olympics boycott. He did however receive one of 461 Congressional Gold Medals created especially for the spurned athletes.
