= John Gregorek =

American middle-distance runner

Personal information
- Nationality: American
- Born: April 15, 1960 (age 66) Huntington, New York, U.S.

Sport
- Sport: Track
- Events: 1500 meters, mile, 3000 meters steeplechase, 5000 meters
- College team: Georgetown

Achievements and titles
- Personal bests: 1500m: 3:35.3; Mile: 3:51.34; 3000m: 7:42.18; 3k steeple: 8:18.45; 5000m: 13:17.44
Medal record
Men's athletics
Representing United States
Universiade
Gold medal – first place	1981 Bucharest	3000-m steeplechase

John Gregorek (born 15 April 1960) is an American former middle-distance runner who competed in the Summer Olympics in 1980 (boycotted) and 1984. His son, John Gregorek Jr., is also a competitive middle-distance runner, who competed in the 2017 World Championships.

== Running career ==
=== High school ===
Gregorek attended St. Anthony's High School, for which he competed in cross country and track. By the time he graduated high school, he was the fastest high school runner in the United States in 1978, posting times of 4:05.4 in the mile and 8:50.7 in two miles.

=== Collegiate ===
Gregorek attended Georgetown on an athletic scholarship. In his sophomore year he made the US Olympic team as a 3000-m steeplechaser but was unable to compete due to the 1980 Summer Olympics boycott. He did however receive one of 461 Congressional Gold Medals created especially for the spurned athletes. On April 23, 1982, Gregorek was the anchor of the Georgetown distance medley team which ended Villanova's 16-year DM streak at the Penn Relays, beating Villanova's anchor and celebrated runner Ross Donoghue by two meters.

=== Post-collegiate ===
Gregorek represented the United States at the 1987 World Championships in Athletics, ran the second heat of the 5000 meters and recorded a time of 14:01. He did not make it past the first round. In 1992, Gregorek finished third in the 1992 US Olympic Trials for the 5000 meters, but did not appear at the 1992 Summer Olympics.

Gregorek moved to Seekonk, Massachusetts, and coached the men's distance and cross country teams at Brown University for a time. He was inducted into the Suffolk Sports Hall of Fame on Long Island in the Track & Field Category with the Class of 2015.
