= Shonel Ferguson =

Bahamian long jumper and sprinter (born 1957)

Shonel Ferguson MBE
Personal information
- Born: 6 November 1957 (age 68)
Medal record
Women's Athletics
Representing the Bahamas
Commonwealth Games
Gold medal – first place	1982 Brisbane	Long jump
CARIFTA Games (U20)
Gold medal – first place	1976 Nassau	Long jump
Bronze medal – third place	1975 Hamilton	Long jump
Bronze medal – third place	1976 Nassau	100 m
Olympic Boycott Games
Bronze medal – third place	1980 Philadelphia	Long jump

Shonel Laverne Ferguson MBE (born November 6, 1957, in Nassau) is a former track and field athlete from the Bahamas, who competed in the women's sprint and long jump events during her career. She is a three-time Olympian (1976, 1984 and 1988). Ferguson was inducted into the Bahamas Track and Field Hall of Fame in 1993.

Ferguson competed for the Florida Gators track and field team, finishing 6th in the long jump at the 1980 AIAW Indoor Track and Field Championships.

She was appointed Member of the Order of the British Empire (MBE) in the 1986 New Year Honours for services to sport.

She was elected MP for Fox Hill in the 2017 Bahamian general election for the Free National Movement. She did not stand in the 2021 Bahamian general election.
