= Benn Fields =

American high jumper

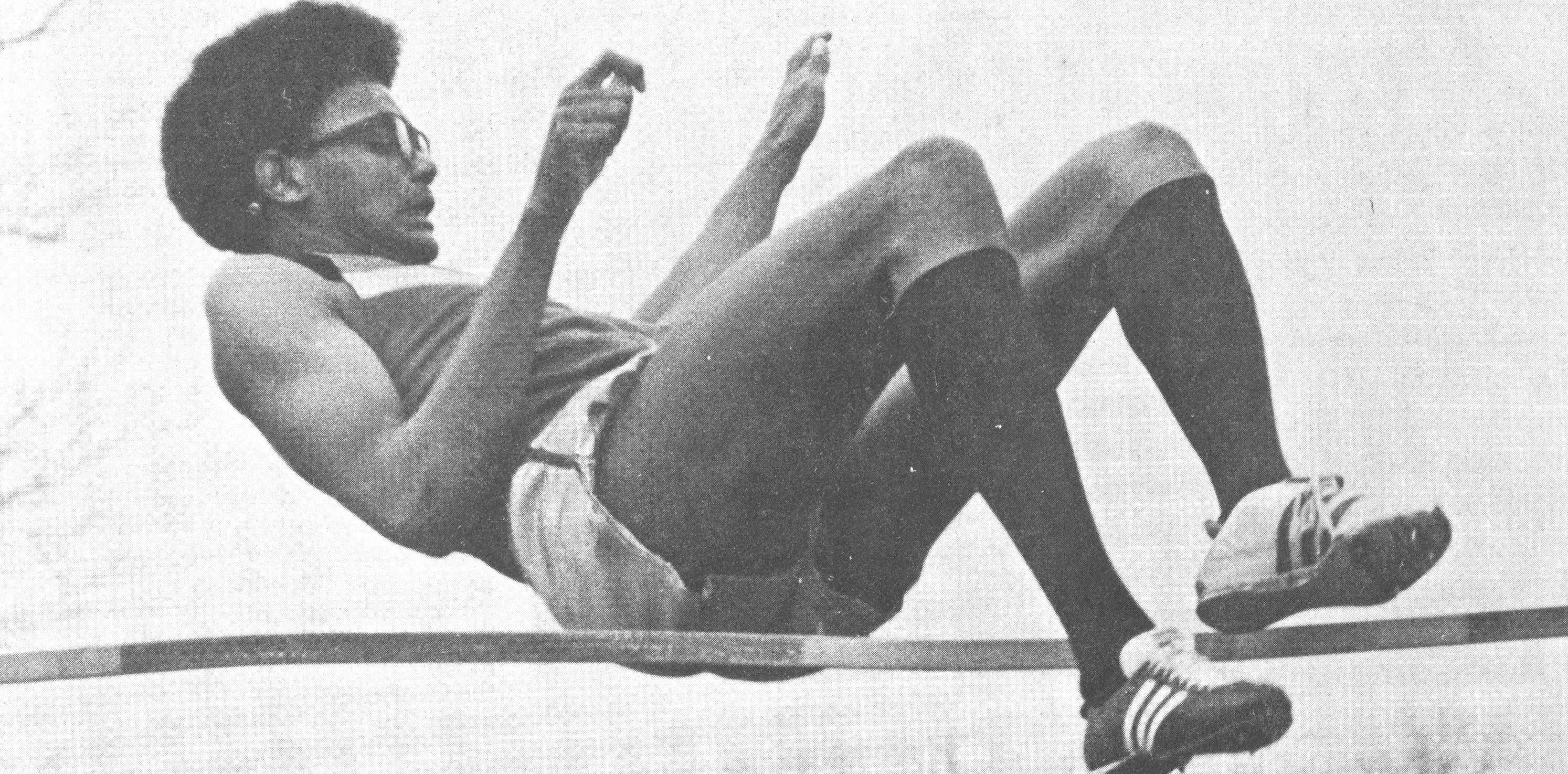
- Fields jumping for the Washingtonville Wizards in 1972

Personal information
- Full name: Benjamin Fields
- National team: United States
- Born: December 17, 1954 (age 71)

Sport
- Sport: Track and field
- Event: High jump
- College team: New Paltz; Seton Hall
Medal record
Athletics
Representing United States
Pan American Games
Silver medal – second place	1979 San Juan	High jump
Spartakiad
Silver medal – second place	1979 Moscow	High jump

Benjamin "Benn" Fields (born December 17, 1954) is an American former high jumper. In 1979, Fields won silver medals at the Pan American Games and the Soviet Spartakiad. He won his specialty at the 1980 U.S. Olympic Trials, but missed out on Olympic participation due to the American boycott.

== Early career ==
Fields attended Washingtonville High School in Washingtonville, New York, where he set school records in both high jump and triple jump. Originally, he jumped as Ben Fields; he adopted the spelling "Benn" later in his career to make his name more distinctive. In 1972, his senior year at Washingtonville, Fields suffered from a bruised back but recovered fast enough to enter the New York State high school championship meet as one of the favorites in the high jump; he won the state title with a jump of 6 ft 6 in (1.98 m).

After graduating from Washingtonville, Fields entered the State University of New York at New Paltz, setting a SUNY Athletic Conference record as a freshman in 1973 and sharing third place at that year's NCAA College Division championships. SUNY New Paltz dropped its track and field program after that year, with Fields moving to Seton Hall University as a result. While at Seton Hall, he won the 1975 Penn Relays high jump with a jump of 7 ft 1 1/2 in (2.17 m) and placed fourth at that year's NCAA Division I Championships; he also won the 1975 IC4A high jump title as Seton Hall claimed the team championship. In 1976, his final year at Seton Hall, Fields placed eighth at the NCAA championships and seventh at the national (AAU) championships. At that summer's U.S. Olympic Trials Fields no-heighted in the final, failing to qualify for the American team.

== Later career ==
Fields continued high jumping after graduating from Seton Hall, dedicating himself to qualifying for the 1980 Summer Olympics in Moscow, Soviet Union. In 1977, he placed fourth at the AAU championships with a jump of 7 ft 3 in (2.21 m) and was ranked #7 in the United States by Track & Field News for his first national top 10 ranking. At the 1978 AAU meet Fields cleared 7 ft 4 1/4 in (2.24 m) to place shared second, losing only to former world record holder Dwight Stones and tying with former world indoor record holder Franklin Jacobs. He set his personal best, 2.30 m (7 ft 6 1/2 in), in Valparaíso on November 1, 1978; Track & Field News ranked him third in the United States and sixth in the world that year.

Fields won the national indoor championship title at the 1979 AAU indoor championships, jumping a meeting record 7 ft 4 3/4 in (2.25 m) and edging out Jacobs and James Frazier on fewer misses; Stones, the previous year's champion, had been declared a professional and thus wasn't eligible to jump. At the outdoor championships Jacobs in turn won from Fields on countback as both cleared 7 ft 5 in (2.26 m); Jacobs, who had had a mediocre outdoor season until then, only narrowly missed at 7 ft 7 in. That summer Fields represented the United States at the Pan American Games in San Juan, Puerto Rico, and then the Soviet Spartakiad in Moscow; he won silver medals in both meets. At the Pan American Games he only cleared 2.19 m (7 ft 2 1/4 in), but still placed second behind Jacobs; at the Spartakiad, which as a dress rehearsal for the following year's Summer Olympics was inviting non-Soviet athletes for the first time, he jumped 2.24 m (7 ft 4 1/4 in) and lost to the Soviet Union's Aleksandr Grigoryev on more misses. Fields's best jump in 1979 was 2.27 m (7 ft 5 1/2 in), which he jumped in Bratislava on June 7; he defeated world record holder Vladimir Yashchenko in that competition.

Fields remained in good shape in 1980 and was disappointed with the American decision to boycott the Olympics in Moscow. He skipped that year's national championships, but eventually decided to compete at the Olympic Trials (which were held separately); in windy conditions, he won the Trials with a jump of 7 ft 5 in (2.26 m), but due to the boycott he and the other qualifiers didn't get to compete at the Olympics. Track & Field News ranked him a career-best fifth in the world that year, and first in the United States; it was his only national #1 ranking.

Although Fields was never world-ranked again after 1980, he continued his jumping career. At the 1982 U.S.: outdoor championships, he placed second behind Milton Ottey, a Canadian. As the top United States jumper, he was the American champion. 1982 marked the last time Fields was ranked in the national top ten; he attempted to qualify for the Olympics again at the 1984 Trials, but no-heighted in the qualification round.

== Recognition ==
Fields qualified for the 1980 U.S. Olympic team but was unable to compete due to the boycott. He did however receive one of 461 Congressional Gold Medals created especially for the spurned athletes.

Fields was inducted in the Seton Hall Pirates Hall of Fame in 1982 and in the New Paltz Hawks Hall of Fame in 2005.
