= Nat Page =

American track and field athlete

Personal information
- Nationality: American
- Born: Nathaniel Page; January 26, 1957 (age 69) New Orleans, Louisiana, U.S.
- Height: 6 ft 3 in (191 cm)
- Weight: 180 lb (82 kg)
- Spouse: Merlene Ottey (1984–1987; divorced)

Sport
- Sport: Track and Field
- Event(s): 400 metre hurdles, high jump
- College team: Missouri Tigers

Nathaniel Page (born January 26, 1957) is an American former track and field athlete who began as a high jumper before concentrating on the 400 meters hurdles. He finished second in the high jump with 2.23 meters at the 1980 U.S. Olympic Trials, to qualify for the Moscow Olympics, which the American team boycotted.

His high jump best is 2.29 meters indoors, set in February 1981 in New York. His outdoor best is 2.28 meters, set in Brussels in August 1981. He switched to the hurdles in 1984 after an injury to his jumping leg. His 400 meters hurdles best of 48.75 secs was set in Verona in September 1989. He reached the 400m hurdles final at the U.S. Championships in seven out of eight years between 1985 and 1992 (he didn't compete in 1988).

As a senior at Evanston High School, Page broke his own Illinois High School Association record in the high jump by clearing 7 feet at the 1975 state meet. He was an All-American competitor at the University of Missouri, becoming the collegiate national high jump champion in 1979. That same year he broke the program record for the outdoor high jump at the U.S. Olympic Festival. He was inducted into the University of Missouri Athletics Hall of Fame in 1999.

Page won the British AAA Championships title in the 400 metres hurdles event at the 1990 AAA Championships.

Page married Jamaican sprinter Merlene Ottey in February 1984; they divorced in 1987. He earned his bachelor's degree in physical education at California State Polytechnic University, Pomona while serving as an assistant coach for the Broncos track team from 1988 to 1991. He subsequently joined the coaching staff at Georgia Tech in 1996. He was named the 2008 NCAA South Region Men's Assistant Coach of the Year. Page was an assistant coach for Team USA at the 2020 Summer Olympics.

== Achievements ==
=== International competitions ===
Year	Competition	Venue	Position	Event	Notes
Representing United States
1980	Liberty Bell Classic	Philadelphia, United States	2nd	High jump	2.26m
1990	Goodwill Games	Seattle, United States	4th	400m hurdles	49.34
1992	World Cup	Havana, Cuba	7th	400m hurdles	51.77

=== National titles ===
- NCAA Division I Men's Outdoor Track and Field Championships
  - High jump: 1979
