= Robin Campbell (runner) =

American middle-distance runner (born 1959)

Personal information
- Born: January 25, 1959 (age 67) Washington, D.C., United States

Sport
- Sport: Track and field
Medal record
Representing United States
Summer Universiade
Silver medal – second place	1981 Bucharest	4x400m relay
Silver medal – second place	1983 Edmonton	800m

Robin Theresa Campbell-Bennett (born January 25, 1959) was a U.S. Olympian at 800 meters in 1980 and 1984. She competed in every Olympic Trials between 1972 and 1984.

== Early life and education ==
She was born in Washington D.C. She attended Santa Fe College in Gainesville, Florida; University of Florida, Gainesville; and San Jose State College in San Jose, California, where she graduated with a Bachelor of Arts in liberal studies and a minor in women's studies.

== Athletic career ==
At the Olympic Trials in 1972, at age 13, she won the Exhibition Races for girls U-14 at both 200 meters and 1500 meters. Her times were fast enough to make the U.S. Olympic team, but she was too young to qualify.

Campbell won USA Indoor Track and Field Championships at 400 meters in 1975 and 1500 meters in 1974. She finished second at eight consecutive U.S. Indoor Championships at 800 meters.

On April 25–27, 1975, at the Mt. SAC Relays in California, she won both the 400 meters in 53.5 and the 800 meters in 2:11.6.

At the 1980 Liberty Bell Classic, she won the silver medal at 800 meters, running 2:02.53, finishing between Yvonne Mondesire of Canada 2:02.34 and Ann Mackie-Morelli of Canada 2:02.63.

Her best 800 meter time of 1:59.00 came while winning the USA Outdoor Track and Field Championships. At the 1983 World Championships in Athletics in Helsinki, Finland later that year, she finished fifth.

At the 1984 Summer Olympics in Los Angeles, she finished 10th in the 800 meters race with a time of 2:01.72.

== Personal life ==
She resides in Washington DC, where she heads Fifth Man Track Club.

She served on the Drug Testing Committee, Cultural Exchange Committee, and Youth Sports Committee of USA Track & Field. She is active in the Olympic Alumni Association, Women's Sports Foundation, Stop the Silence: Stop Childhood Sexual Abuse, Fifth Man Track Club, and Potomac Valley Track Club.
