= Ben Plucknett =

American discus thrower

Walter Harrison ("Ben") Plucknett (April 13, 1954 in Beatrice, Nebraska – November 17, 2002 in Essex, Missouri) was an American track and field athlete, known primarily for the discus throw.

Plucknett competed for the Missouri Tigers track and field team in the NCAA.

Plucknett qualified for the 1980 U.S. Olympic team but was unable to compete due to the 1980 Summer Olympics boycott. He did however receive one of 461 Congressional Gold Medals created specifically for the athletes. In 1981, he broke the existing world record with a throw of 71.20 metres (233 ft 7 in), and broke the record again with a throw of 72.34 metres (237 ft 4 in) on July 7, 1981. However, on July 13, 1981, the International Association of Athletics Federations banned Plucknett from further competition after he had tested positive for anabolic steroid use, and the records were removed. Even though he was stripped of his World Record breaking throws the IAAF still recognizes his throw of 71.32 metres (234 ft 0 in) thrown on June 4, 1983, in Eugene, Oregon as the current North American record.

In 1983, Plucknett bench-pressed 623 lb (283 kg).

In 1993, Plucknett broke László Fekete's Weight over bar world record with a 5.54 metres (18 ft 2 in) throw of the 56 lb (25.4 kg) Highland games weight.

He died at the age of 48 due to a brain aneurysm on his farm.
