= Fred Taylor (sprinter) =

American sprinter

Personal information
- Nationality: American
- Born: November 5, 1957 (age 68)

Sport
- Sport: Athletics
- Event: Sprints
Medal record
Representing United States
Summer Universiade
Gold medal – first place	1979 Mexico City	4x400m relay

Fred Taylor (born November 5, 1957) is an American retired sprinter. Taylor qualified for the 1980 U.S. Olympic team but did not compete due to the 1980 Summer Olympics boycott. He did however receive one of 461 Congressional Gold Medals created especially for the spurned athletes.

Taylor competed for the Texas Southern Tigers track and field team in the NCAA.

Taylor finished second behind fellow American Stanley Floyd in the 200 metres event at the British 1981 AAA Championships.
