= Kathy McMillan =

American long jumper

Personal information
- Full name: Catherine Laverne McMillan
- Born: November 7, 1957 (age 68) Raeford, North Carolina, U.S.
Medal record
Women's athletics
Representing the United States
Olympic Games
Silver medal – second place	1976 Montreal	Long jump
Olympic Boycott Games
Gold medal – first place	1980 Philadelphia	Long jump
Pan American Games
Gold medal – first place	1979 San Juan	Long jump
Gold medal – first place	1983 Caracas	Long jump

Catherine "Kathy" Laverne McMillan (born November 7, 1957) is a retired American athlete, who mainly competed in the long jump.

McMillan was born in Raeford, North Carolina. She competed for the United States at the 1976 Summer Olympics held in Montreal, Canada, where she won the silver medal in the Women's Long Jump event as an 18-year-old. She attended Tennessee State University.

While competing for Hoke County High School, in Raeford, North Carolina she set the still standing NFHS National High School Record in the Long Jump of 22 ft 3 in (6.78 m) while participating in the Jack in the Box Invitational at UCLA on June 12, 1976. She was a four-time NCHSAA state champion in the long jump, and also won multiple state titles in both the 100 and 220 yard dash.

McMillan qualified for the 1980 US Olympic team in the long jump, but was unable to compete due to the 1980 Summer Olympics boycott. She did however receive one of 461 Congressional Gold Medals created especially for the spurned athletes.

In 2021 she was elected into the National Track and Field Hall of Fame.
