= David Lee (athlete) =

American hurdler

Personal information
- Nationality: American
- Born: April 23, 1959 (age 67)

Sport
- Sport: Athletics
- Event: hurdles
- Club: Southern Illinois Salukis
Medal record
Representing United States
Summer Universiade
Gold medal – first place	1981 Bucharest	110m hurdles
Silver medal – second place	1981 Bucharest	4x400m relay

David Lee (born April 23, 1959) is an American former hurdler. Lee qualified for the 1980 U.S. Olympic team but was unable to compete due to the 1980 Summer Olympics boycott. He did however receive one of 461 Congressional Gold Medals created especially for the spurned athletes.

Competing for the Southern Illinois Salukis track and field team, Lee won the 1980 NCAA Division I Outdoor Track and Field Championships in the 400 metres hurdles.

Lee won the British AAA Championships title in the 400 metres hurdles event at the 1983 AAA Championships.
