= Lorna Griffin =

American athlete (born 1956)

Personal information
- Full name: Lorna Joann Griffin
- Born: June 9, 1956 (age 70) Hamilton, Montana, U.S.
- Height: 5 ft 11 in (1.81 m)

Sport
- Country: United States
- Sport: Athletics
- Event(s): Shot put, Discus throw
Medal record
Women's athletics
Representing the United States
Pan American Games
Silver medal – second place	1983 Caracas	Discus throw
Silver medal – second place	1983 Caracas	Shot put

Lorna Joann Griffin (born June 9, 1956, in Hamilton, Montana) is a retired female shot putter and discus thrower from the United States. She was a two-time silver medalist at the 1983 Pan American Games. Griffin qualified for the 1980 U.S. Olympic team but was unable to compete due to the 1980 Summer Olympics boycott. She did however receive one of 461 Congressional Gold Medals created especially for the spurned athletes. She competed for the United States at the 1984 Summer Olympics, finishing in 9th (shot put) and 12th place (discus).

Griffin competed in the AIAW for the Flathead Valley Mountainettes track and field team. At the 1975 AIAW Outdoor Track and Field Championships, she finished runner-up in the discus and 5th in the shot put. She later competed for the Seattle Pacific Falcons track and field team.
