= 1977 USA Outdoor Track and Field Championships =

- Dates: June 9–10
- Host city: Westwood, California, United States
- Venue: Drake Stadium University of California, Los Angeles

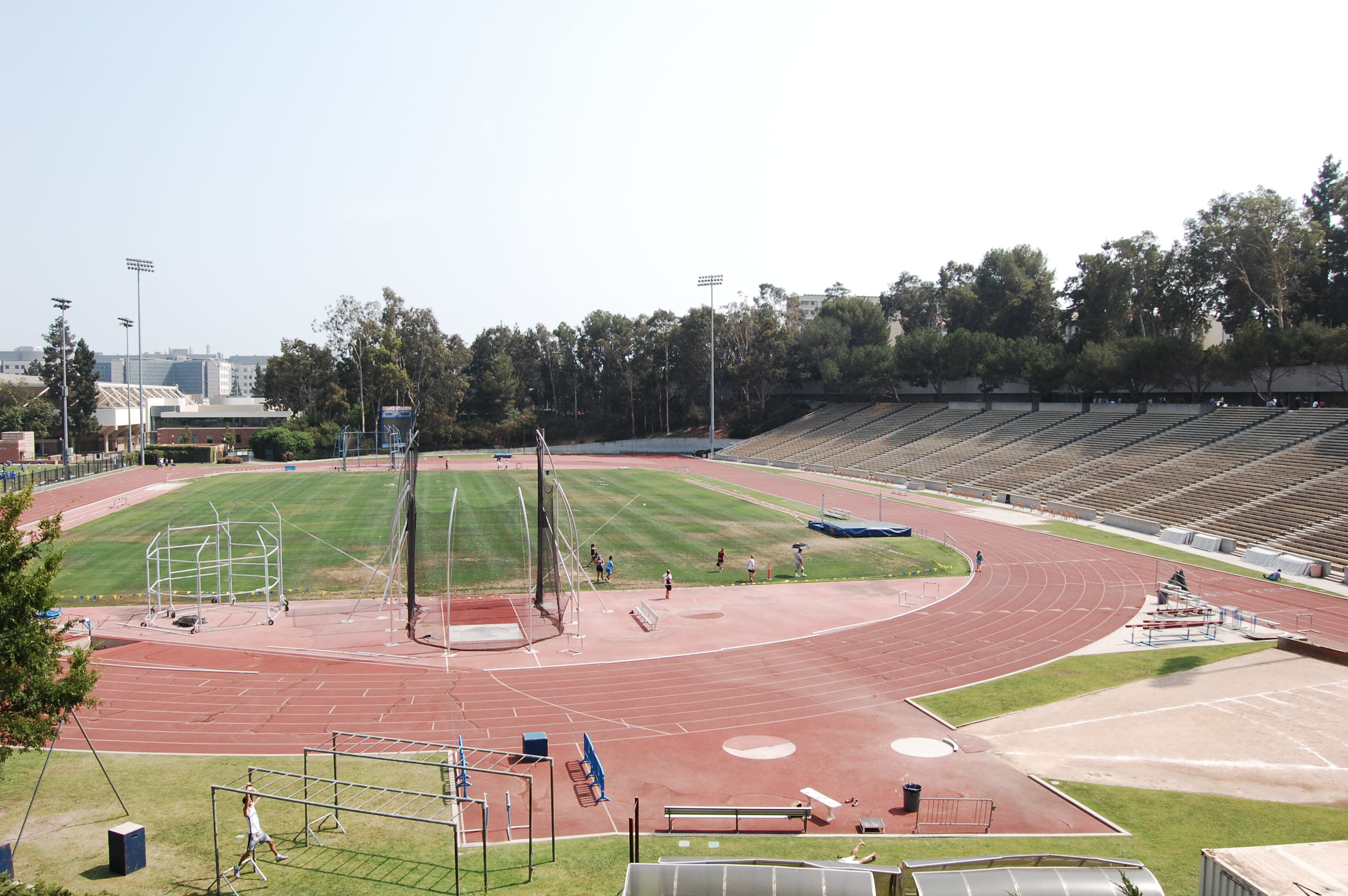
Drake Stadium

The 1977 USA Outdoor Track and Field Championships took place between June 9–10 at Drake Stadium on the campus of University of California, Los Angeles in Westwood, California. The decathlon took place on July 9–10 in Bloomington, Indiana. This meet was organized by the AAU.

== Results ==
=== Men track events ===
Event	Gold		Silver		Bronze	
100 meters	Donald Quarrie; Jamaica; Steve Williams	10.12 10.24	Mike Kee	10.27	Steve Riddick	10.36
200 meters	Derald Harris	20.6	James Gilkes; Guyana; William Collins	20.6 20.7	Cliff Wiley	20.8
400 meters	Robert E. Taylor	45.44	Tony Darden	45.60	Maxie Parks	45.81
800 meters	Mark Belger	1.45.81	Seymour Newman; Jamaica; James Robinson	1.45.90 1.46.04	Mark Enyeart	1.46.11
1500 meters	Steve Scott	3.37.3 MRm	Wilson Waigwa; Kenya; Michael Slack	3.37.3 3.37.5	Phil Kane	3.39.4
5000 meters	Martin Liquori	13.41.6	Gregory Fredericks	13.42.9	Randy Melancon	13.43.6
10,000 meters	Frank Shorter	28.19.8	Rick Rojas	28.50.6	Randy Thomas	29.01.2
Marathon (42.195 km.)	Hakan Spik; Finland; Edward Schelegle	2.17.49 2.18.11	Joe Carlson	2.20.13	Dave Babiracki	2.20.38
110 meters hurdles	Charles Foster	13.49	James Owens	13.49	Willie Davenport	13.56
400 meters hurdles	Edwin Moses	47.45 WR	Tom Andrews	49.03	James Walker	49.21
3000 meters steeplechase	James Munyala; Kenya; George Malley	8.21.6 MR 8.22.54 AR	Ron Addison	8.22.8	Henry Marsh	8.25.8
5000 m walk	Todd Scully	21:30.1	Larry Walker	22:03.1	Steve DiBernardo	22:30.6

=== Men field events ===
Event	Gold		Silver		Bronze	
High jump	Dwight Stones	2.29 m (7 ft 6 in) MR	Franklin Jacobs	2.27 m (7 ft 5 1/4 in)	Rory Kotinek	2.27 m (7 ft 5 1/4 in)
Pole vault	Mike Tully	5.54 m (18 ft 2 in) MR	Dan Ripley	5.43 m (17 ft 9 3/4 in)	Larry Jessee	5.43 m (17 ft 9 3/4 in)
Long jump	Arnie Robinson	8.24 m (27 ft 1/4 in)	Charlton Ehizuelen; Nigeria; Anthony Carter	8.15 m (26 ft 8 3/4 in)w 8.14 m (26 ft 8 1/4 in)w	James Lofton	8.11 m (26 ft 7 1/4 in)
Triple jump	Caleb Abdul Rahman	17.38 m (57 ft 1/4 in)w	James Butts	17.00 m (55 ft 9 1/4 in)w	Ron Livers	16.93 m (55 ft 6 1/2 in)w
Shot put	Terry Albritton	20.50 m (67 ft 3 in)	Al Feuerbach	20.47 m (67 ft 1 3/4 in)	Peter Shmock	20.24 m (66 ft 4 3/4 in)
Discus throw	Mac Wilkins	69.19 m (227 ft 0 in)	Ken Stadel	66.42 m (217 ft 10 in)	John Powell	65.68 m (215 ft 5 in)
Hammer throw	Emmitt Berry	67.84 m (222 ft 6 in)	Peter Farmer; Australia; Boris Djerassi	67.64 m (221 ft 10 in) 66.57 m (218 ft 4 in)	George Frenn	63.65 m (208 ft 9 in)
Javelin throw	Bruce Kennedy; Rhodesia; Rod Ewaliko	79.93 m (262 ft 2 in) 79.50 m (260 ft 9 in)	Anthony Hall	79.12 m (259 ft 6 in)	Richard George	77.80 m (255 ft 2 in)
Pentathlon	Mike Hill	3742 pts				
Decathlon	Fred Dixon	8037	John Warkentin	8031	Roger George	7748

=== Women track events ===
Event	Gold		Silver		Bronze	
100 meters	Evelyn Ashford	11.14w	Brenda Morehead	11.19w	Chandra Cheeseborough	11.36w
200 meters	Evelyn Ashford	22.62	Deborah Jones; Bermuda; Chandra Cheeseborough	23.05 23.20	Brenda Morehead	23.33
400 meters	Sharon Dabney	51.55 MR	Lorna Forde; Barbados; Rosalyn Bryant	52.00 53.44	Kim Thomas	53.58
800 meters	Sue Latter	2.03.8	Julie Brown	2.04.0	Tecla Chemabwai; Kenya; Cyndy Poor	2.07.7 2.04.7
1500 meters	Francie Larrieu	4.08.2	Janice Merrill	4.09.3	Cindy Bremser	4.11.8
3000 meters	Janice Merrill	9.00.2	Cindy Bremser	9.04.0	Francie Larrieu	9.16.7
10000 meters	Peggy Neppel	33.15.1 WR	Karen Bridges	34.27.9	Lori Ann Thrupp	34.40.5
Marathon Minneapolis	Leal-Ann Reinhart	2.46.34	Cindy Dalrymple	2.49.11	Nina Kuscsik	2.50.22
100 meters hurdles	Patricia Van Wolvelaere	13.15w	Debbie LaPlante	13.21w	Modupe Oshikoya; Nigeria; Mary Smith	13.45w 13.75w
400 meters hurdles	Mary Ayers	56.61 AR	Debbie Esser	56.90	Sandra Levinski	57.90

=== Women field events ===
Event	Gold		Silver		Bronze	
High jump	Joni Huntley	1.85 m (6 ft 3/4 in)	Louise Ritter	1.80 m (5 ft 10 3/4 in)	Paula Girven	1.80 m (5 ft 10 3/4 in)
Long jump	Jodi Anderson	6.63 m (21 ft 9 in)	Kathy McMillan	6.53 m (21 ft 5 in)	Lorraine Ray	6.46 m (21 ft 2 1/4 in)
Shot put	Maren Seidler	16.49 m (54 ft 1 in)	Jane Frederick	15.55 m (51 ft 0 in)	Kathy Devine	15.10 m (49 ft 6 1/4 in)
Discus throw	Jane Haist; Canada; Lynne Winbigler	58.98 m (193 ft 6 in) 57.06 m (187 ft 2 in) AR	Jan Svendsen	53.59 m (175 ft 9 in)	Karen Marshall	51.28 m (168 ft 2 in)
Javelin throw	Kathy Schmidt	61.14 m (200 ft 7 in)	Sherry Calvert	58.27 m (191 ft 2 in)	Lynn Cannon	57.43 m (188 ft 5 in)
Pentathlon	Linda Cornelius	3919	Teri Seippel	3719	Heidi Hertz	3708

== See also ==
- United States Olympic Trials (track and field)
