= 1978 USA Outdoor Track and Field Championships =

- Dates: June 8–9
- Host city: Westwood, California, United States
- Venue: Drake Stadium University of California, Los Angeles

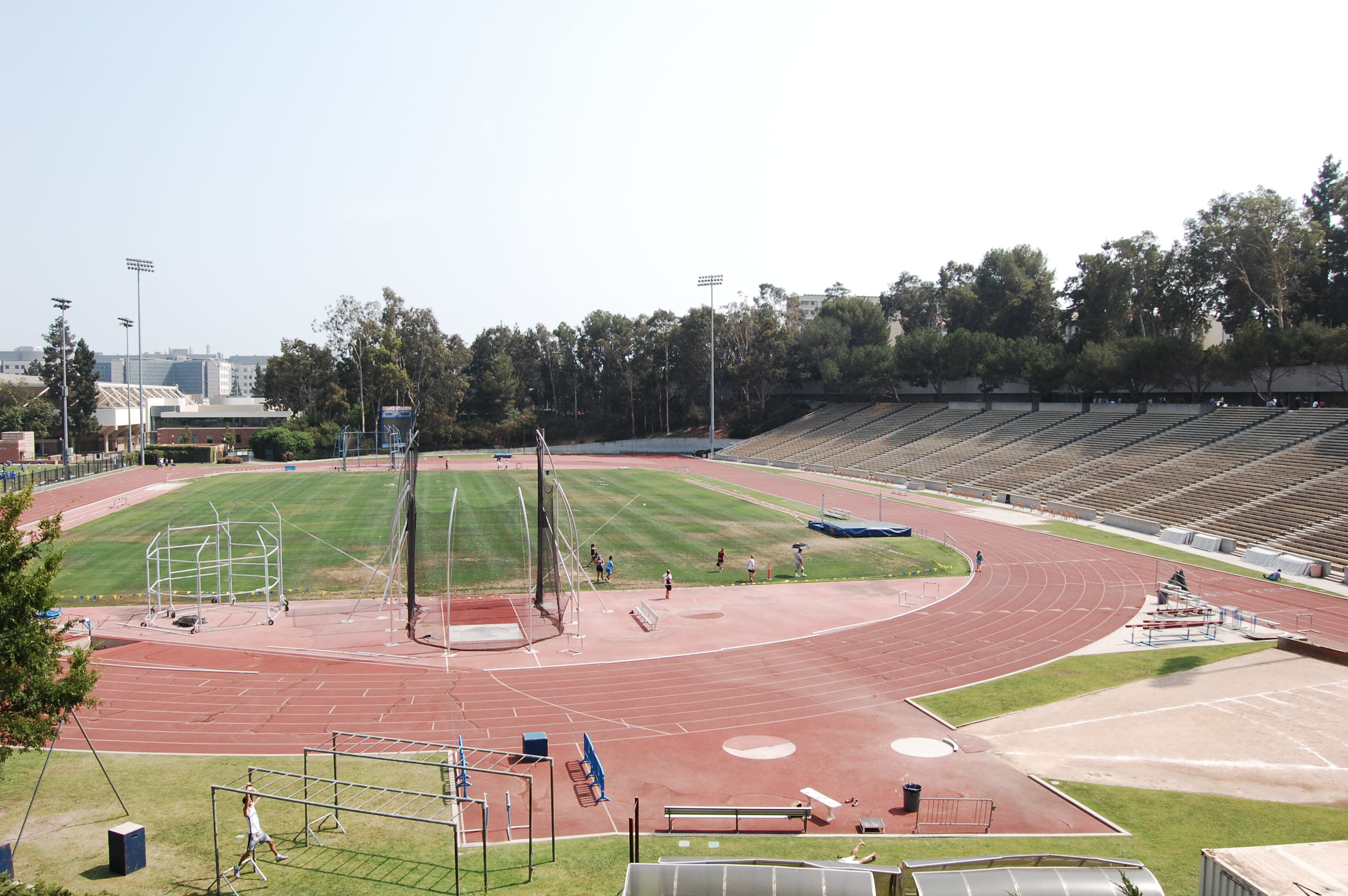
Drake Stadium

The 1978 USA Outdoor Track and Field Championships took place between June 8–9 at Drake Stadium on the campus of University of California, Los Angeles in Westwood, California. This was its fourth time hosting in the previous five years. The decathlon took place on June 24–25 in Richmond, Virginia. This meet was organized by the AAU.

== Results ==
=== Men track events ===
| Event | Gold | | Silver | | Bronze | |
|---|---|---|---|---|---|---|
| 100 meters | Clancy Edwards | 10.14w | Donald Quarrie; Jamaica; Guy Abrahams; Panama; Steve Riddick | 10.15w 10.17w 10.19w | Steve Williams | 10.21w |
| 200 meters | Clancy Edwards | 20.25 | James Gilkes; Guyana; Tony Darden | 20.46 20.48 | Frederick Taylor | 20.63 |
| 400 meters | Maxie Parks | 45.15 | Maurice Peoples | 45.22 | Adrian Rodgers | 45.41 |
| 800 meters | James Robinson | 1:45.47 | Michael Boit; Kenya; Mark Belger | 1:46.03 1:46.21 | Rayfield Beaton; Guyana; Conrad Suhr | 1:46.47 1:46.84 |
| 1500 meters | Steve Scott | 3.38.8 | Sydney Maree; South Africa; Steve Lacy | 3.38.9 3.39.0 | Tom Duits | 3.39.4 |
| 5000 meters | Martin Liquori | 13.40.2 | Gregory Fredericks | 13.41.0 | Matt Centrowitz | 13.41.0 |
| 10000 meters | Craig Virgin | 28.15.0 | Garry Bjorklund | 28.35.0 | Jeff Wells | 28.45.6 |
| 110 meters hurdles | Renaldo Nehemiah | 13.28 MRam | Greg Foster | 13.43 | Kerry Bethel | 13.60 |
| 400 meters hurdles | James Walker | 49.03 | Tom Andrews | 49.63 | Sam Turner | 49.82 |
| 3000 meters steeplechase | Henry Marsh | 8.27.3 | Douglas Brown | 8.30.1 | George Malley | 8.30.5 |
| 5000 m walk | Joe Berendt | 22:31.6 | | | | |
| 20 km walk | Todd Scully | 1:44:46 | | | | |

=== Men field events ===
| Event | Gold | | Silver | | Bronze | |
|---|---|---|---|---|---|---|
| High jump | Dwight Stones | 2.30 m (7 ft 6 1/2 in) MR | Ben Fields | 2.24 m (7 ft 4 in) | Franklin Jacobs | 2.24 m (7 ft 4 in) |
| Pole vault | Dan Ripley | 5.56 m (18 ft 2 3/4 in) MR | Mike Tully | 5.48 m (17 ft 11 1/2 in) | Jeff Taylor | 5.33 m (17 ft 5 3/4 in) |
| Long jump | Arnie Robinson | 8.33 m (27 ft 3 3/4 in)w | James Lofton | 8.23 m (27 ft 0 in) | Charlton Ehizuelen; Nigeria; Bob Calhoun | 7.94 m (26 ft 1/2 in) 7.82 m (25 ft 7 3/4 in) |
| Triple jump | James Butts | 16.90 m (55 ft 5 1/4 in) | Rayfield Dupree | 16.46 m (54 ft 0 in) | Paul Jordan | 16.46 m (54 ft 0 in) |
| Shot put | Al Feuerbach | 20.46 m (67 ft 1 1/2 in) | Colin Anderson | 20.29 m (66 ft 6 3/4 in) | Doug Price | 19.96 m (65 ft 5 3/4 in) |
| Discus throw | Mac Wilkins | 66.98 m (219 ft 9 in) | Ken Stadel | 63.85 m (209 ft 5 in) | David Voorhees | 61.77 m (202 ft 7 in) |
| Hammer throw | Boris Djerassi | 68.35 m (224 ft 2 in) | Emmitt Berry | 65.63 m (215 ft 3 in) | Peter Galle | 65.50 m (214 ft 10 in) |
| Javelin throw | Bill Schmidt | 84.35 m (276 ft 8 in) | Bob Roggy | 82.93 m (272 ft 0 in) | Rod Ewaliko | 81.28 m (266 ft 8 in) |
| Pentathlon | Joe Hilbe | 3322 pts | | | | |
| Decathlon | Mike Hill | 8004 pts | Allen Hamlin | 7776 pts | Jim Howell | 7679 pts |

=== Women track events ===
| Event | Gold | | Silver | | Bronze | |
|---|---|---|---|---|---|---|
| 100 meters | Lilieth Hodges; Jamaica; Brenda Morehead | 11.23 11.25 | Evelyn Ashford | 11.30 | Chandra Cheeseborough | 11.61 |
| 200 meters | Evelyn Ashford | 22.66 | Brenda Morehead | 22.88 | Chandra Cheeseborough | 23.55 |
| 400 meters | Lorna Forde; Barbados; Patricia Jackson | 51.04 MR 51.11 | Sharon Dabney | 51.31 | June Griffith; Guyana; Rosalyn Bryant | 51.50 51.99 |
| 800 meters | Ruth Caldwell | 2.02.0 | Essie Kelley | 2.03.0 | Mary Decker | 2.03.1 |
| 1500 meters | Janice Merrill | 4.09.4 | Debbie Heald | 4.10.9 | Cindy Bremser | 4.11.1 |
| 3000 meters | Janice Merrill | 8.56.4 MR | Kathy Mills | 9.03.3 | Cindy Bremser | 9.11.8 |
| 10000 meters | Ellison Goodall | 33.40.2 | Sue Kinsey | 33.42.7 | Karen Bridges | 34.17.3 |
| Marathon New York | Marta Cooksey | 2.41.48 | Sue Peterson | 2.44.43 | Doreen Ennis | 2.46.38 |
| 100 meters hurdles | Patricia Van Wolvelaere | 13.19 MR | Debbie LaPlante | 13.22 | Mary Smith | 13.50 |
| 400 meters hurdles | Debbie Esser | 57.85 | Eleanor Mahal; Canada; June Smith; Trinidad and Tobago; Debra Melrose | 58.60 58.62 59.17 | Stephanie Vega; Puerto Rico; Sandra Souza | 59.36 59.36 |
| 10,000 m walk | Sue Brodock | 52:18.2 | | | | |

=== Women field events ===
| Event | Gold | | Silver | | Bronze | |
|---|---|---|---|---|---|---|
| High jump | Louise Ritter | 1.86 m (6 ft 1 in) | Pam Spencer | 1.86 m (6 ft 1 in) | Deborah Brill; Canada; Coleen Reinstra | 1.83 m (6 ft 0 in) 1.83 m (6 ft 0 in) |
| Long jump | Jodi Anderson | 6.89 m (22 ft 7 1/4 in) AR | Kathy McMillan | 6.72 m (22 ft 1/2 in) | June Griffith; Guyana; Sherron Walker | 6.30 m (20 ft 8 in) 6.28 m (20 ft 7 in) |
| Shot put | Maren Seidler | 18.18 m (59 ft 7 1/2 in) MR | Ann Turbyne | 15.96 m (52 ft 4 1/4 in) | Kathy Devine | 15.49 m (50 ft 9 3/4 in) |
| Discus throw | Lynne Winbigler | 54.40 m (178 ft 5 in) | Lorna Griffin | 53.69 m (176 ft 1 in) | Helene Connell | 52.12 m (170 ft 11 in) |
| Javelin throw | Sherry Calvert | 62.05 m (203 ft 6 in) | Kathy Schmidt | 60.48 m (198 ft 5 in) | Lynn Cannon | 55.29 m (181 ft 4 in) |
| Pentathlon | Modupe Oshikoya; Nigeria; Themis Zambrzycki; Brazil; Jodi Anderson | 4379 4352 4179 | Judy Fontaine | 4112 | Denise Cornell | 4088 |

== See also ==
- United States Olympic Trials (track and field)
