= 1979 USA Outdoor Track and Field Championships =

- Dates: June 16–17
- Host city: Walnut, California, United States
- Venue: Hilmer Lodge Stadium Mt. San Antonio College

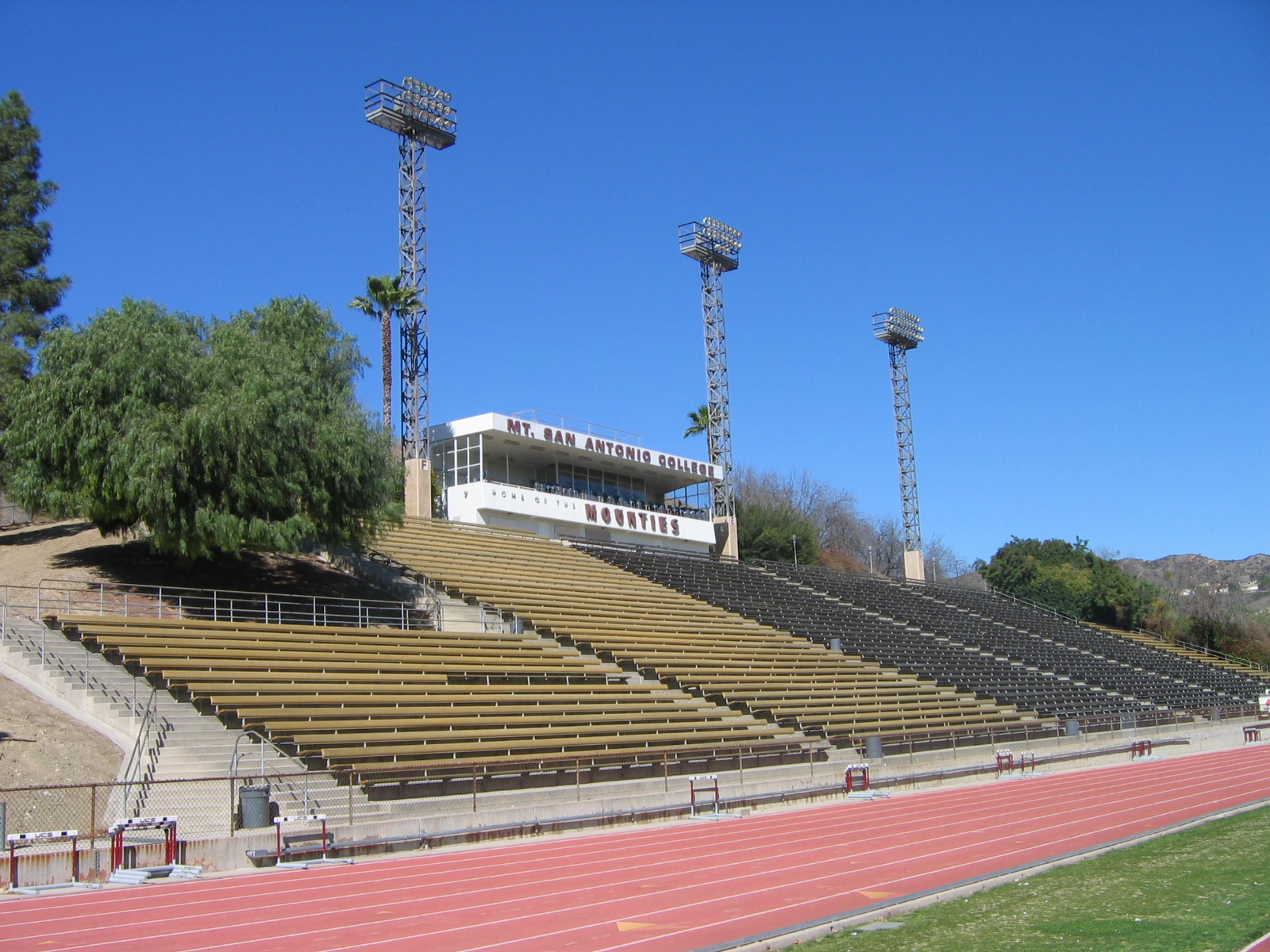

The 1979 USA Outdoor Track and Field Championships took place between June 16–17 at Hilmer Lodge Stadium on the campus of Mt. San Antonio College in Walnut, California. The decathlon took place on June 3–4. This was the last time the meet was organized by the AAU. Their status as the national governing body was terminated at the end of the year as a result of the Amateur Sports Act of 1978. They were replaced by the newly formed organization The Athletics Congress, hosting the meet at this same location.

== Results ==
=== Men track events ===
Event	Gold		Silver		Bronze	
100 meters	James Sanford	10.07	Harvey Glance	10.15	Emmit King	10.16
200 meters	Dwayne Evans	20.27	Don Coleman	20.39	Cliff Wiley	20.44
400 meters	Willie Smith	45.10	Tony Darden	45.14	Bill Green	45.51
800 meters	James Robinson	1.45.82	Agberto Guimarães; Brazil; Mike White	1.46.5h 1.47.06	Mark Enyeart	1.47.4h
1500 meters	Steve Scott	3.36.40 MRm	Don Paige	3.37.33	Todd Harbour	3.40.20
5000 meters	Matt Centrowitz	13.40.8	Wilson Waigwa; Kenya; Herb Lindsay	13.42.1; 13.42.5	Stan Mavis	13.43.1
10000 meters	Craig Virgin	27.39.4 AR	Rick Rojas	28.24.2	Frank Shorter	28.26.6
Marathon (42.195 km.)	Tom Antczak	2.15.28	Scott Eden	2.16.21	Richard Mahoney	2.17.25
110 m Hurdles	Renaldo Nehemiah	13.19 MRm	Dedy Cooper	13.46	Charles Foster	13.59
400 m Hurdles	Edwin Moses	47.89	Quentin Wheeler	48.39	James Walker	49.13
3000 m Steeplechase	Henry Marsh	8.33.1	Bill McCullough	8.33.8	Greg Meyer	8.35.8
5000 m walk	Dan O'Connor	21:46.6				
20 km walk	Neal Pyke	1:27:11				

=== Men field events ===
Event	Gold		Silver		Bronze	
High Jump	Franklin Jacobs	2.26 m (7 ft 4 3/4 in)	Ben Fields	2.26 m (7 ft 4 3/4 in)	Reynaldo Brown	2.20 m (7 ft 2 1/2 in)
Pole Vault	Mike Tully	5.50 m (18 ft 1/2 in)	Billy Olson	5.50 m (18 ft 1/2 in)	Greg Woepse	5.40 m (17 ft 8 1/2 in)
Long Jump	Larry Myricks	8.28 m (27 ft 1 3/4 in)w	Carl Lewis	8.09 m (26 ft 6 1/2 in)w	Randy Williams	8.05 m (26 ft 4 3/4 in)w
Triple Jump	Ron Livers	17.56 m (57 ft 7 1/4 in)w	Willie Banks	17.43 m (57 ft 2 in)w	James Butts	16.91 m (55 ft 5 1/2 in)w
Shot Put	Dave Laut	21.11 m (69 ft 3 in)	Al Feuerbach	20.64 m (67 ft 8 1/2 in)	Colin Anderson	20.43 m (67 ft 1/4 in)
Discus Throw	Mac Wilkins	70.66 m (231 ft 9 in) CR	Ken Stadel	69.26 m (227 ft 2 in)	Knut Hjeltnes; Norway; John Powell	68.88 m (225 ft 11 in) 67.33 m (220 ft 10 in)
Hammer throw	Scott Neilson; Canada; Boris Djerassi	72.06 m (236 ft 5 in) CR 68.73 m (225 ft 5 in)	Andy Bessette	67.31 m (220 ft 10 in)	Emmitt Berry	67.10 m (220 ft 1 in)
Javelin throw	Duncan Atwood	81.86 m (268 ft 6 in)	Rod Ewaliko	80.47 m (264 ft 0 in)	Bill Schmidt	80.14 m (262 ft 11 in)
Decathlon	Bobby Coffman	8154	John Crist	8149	John Whitson	7798

=== Women track events ===
Event	Gold		Silver		Bronze	
100 meters	Evelyn Ashford	11.01w	Brenda Morehead	11.13w	Chandra Cheeseborough	11.33w
200 meters	Evelyn Ashford	22.07w	Valerie Brisco	22.53w	Brenda Morehead	22.75w
400 meters	Patricia Jackson	52.37	Sharon Dabney	52.52	Sherri Howard	52.54
800 meters	Essie Kelley	2.02.3	Julie Brown	2.02.6	Madeline Manning	2.02.8
1500 meters	Francie Larrieu	4.04.6 MR	Mary Decker	4.06.8	Julie Brown	4.09.4
3000 meters	Francie Larrieu	8.53.8 MR	Janice Merrill	8.54.0	Julie Brown	8.58.3
10000 meters	Mary Shea	32.52.5	Joan Benoit	32.52.5	Amy Laffoon	34.31.0
Marathon (Houston)	Sue Peterson	2.46.17	Donna Burge	2.54.15	Pat Albert	2.56.57
100 meters hurdles	Debbie LaPlante	12.86 AR	Candy Young	12.95	Stephanie Hightower	13.09
400 meters hurdles	Edna Brown	57.60	Debra Melrose	58.33	Debbie Esser	58.68
10,000 m walk	Sue Broddock	50:32.8				

=== Women field events ===
Event	Gold		Silver		Bronze	
High jump	Deborah Brill; Canada; Louise Ritter	1.93 m (6 ft 3 3/4 in)MR 1.89 m (6 ft 2 1/4 in)	Pam Spencer	1.83 m (6 ft 0 in)	Coleen Reinstra	1.83 m (6 ft 0 in)
Long jump	Kathy McMillan	6.49 m (21 ft 3 1/2 in)w	Jane Frederick	6.44 m (21 ft 1 1/2 in)w	Patricia Johnson	6.35 m (20 ft 10 in)w
Shot put	Maren Seidler	19.09 m (62 ft 7 1/2 in) AR	Ann Turbyne	17.00 m (55 ft 9 1/4 in)	Kathy Devine	16.06 m (52 ft 8 1/4 in)
Discus throw	Lynne Winbigler	57.73 m (189 ft 4 3/4 in)	Lorna Griffin	56.56 m (185 ft 6 3/4 in)	Ria Stalman; Netherlands; Helene Connell	55.42 m (181 ft 9 3/4 in) 52.53 m (172 ft 4 in)
Javelin throw	Kathy Schmidt	62.81 m (206 ft 3/4 in)	Cathy Sulinski	54.63 m (179 ft 2 3/4 in)	Lynn Cannon	52.83 m (173 ft 3 3/4 in)
Pentathlon	Jane Frederick	4506	Themis Zambrzycki; Brazil; Jodi Anderson	4445 4354	Linda Waltman	4123

== See also ==
- United States Olympic Trials (track and field)
