= 1975 USA Outdoor Track and Field Championships =

- Dates: June 25–27
- Host city: Eugene, Oregon; White Plains, New York, United States
- Venue: Hayward Field; White Plains High School

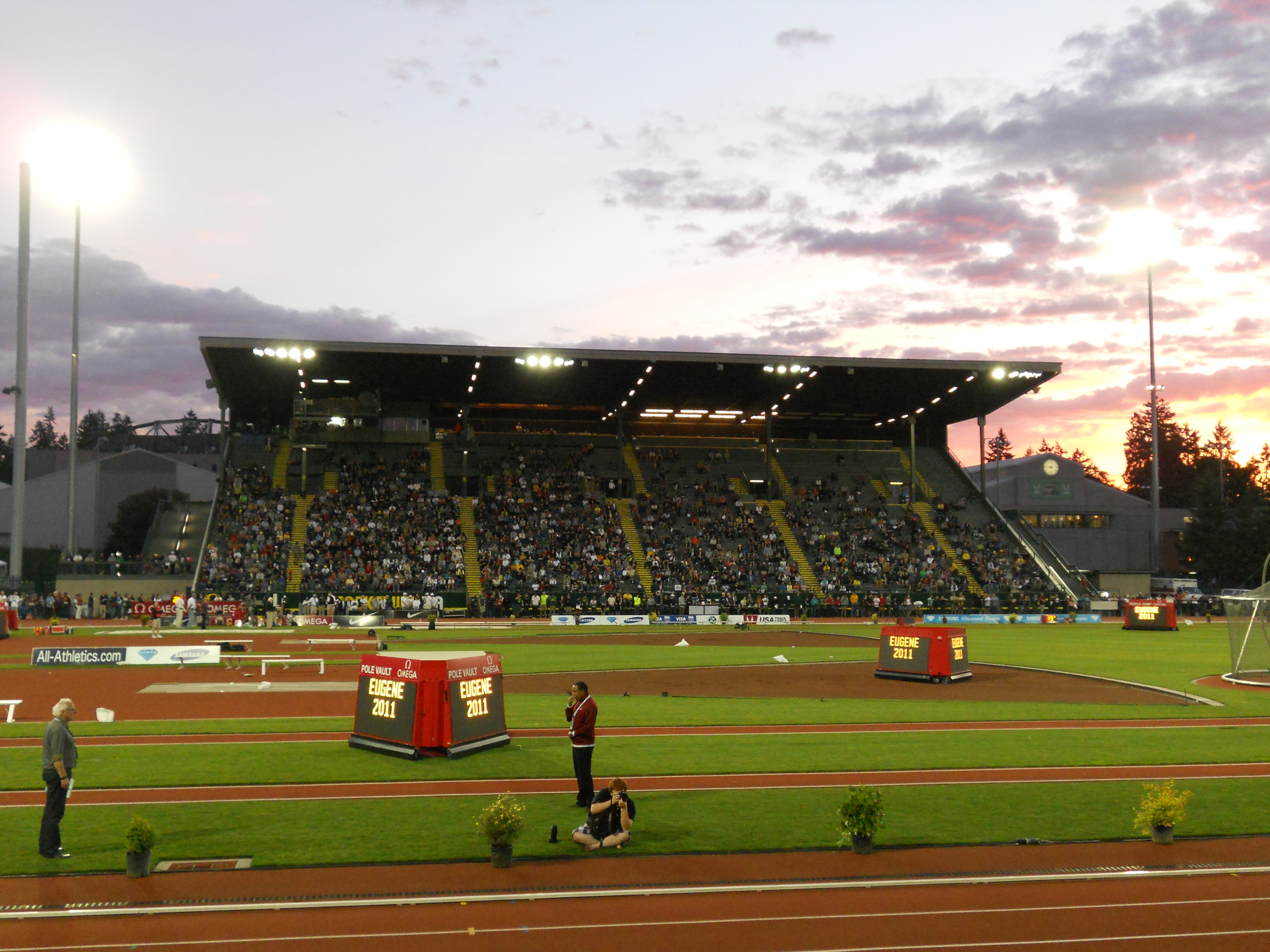
Hayward Field during the 2011 Prefontaine Classic

The Men's 1975 USA Outdoor Track and Field Championships took place between June 25–27 at Hayward Field on the campus of University of Oregon in Eugene, Oregon. The Women's Championships took place at White Plains High School in White Plains, New York. The meet was organized by the Amateur Athletic Union. This was the last edition to segregate genders.

The men's marathon championships were held at the Western Hemisphere Marathon in Culver City, California, on December 7, 1975. The women's Marathon championships were held in the New York Marathon, September 28, 1975.

== Results ==
=== Men's track events ===
Event	Gold		Silver		Bronze	
100 meters	Donald Quarrie Jamaica; Steve Williams	10.16; 10.21	James GilkesGuyana; Edward Preston	10.27; 10.37	Charles Wells	10.42
200 meters	Donald Quarrie Jamaica; James Gilkes Guyana; Reggie Jones	20.12 CR; 20.39; 20.59	Steve Williams	20.66	Larry Brown	20.86
400 meters	David Jenkins United Kingdom; Fred Newhouse	44.93 CR; 45.22	Stan Vinson	45.24	Robert E. Taylor	45.26
800 meters	Mark Enyeart	1.44.87	Rick Wohlhuter	1.45.28	Tom McLean	1.46.06
1500 meters	Leonard Hilton	3.38.3	Ken Popejoy	3.38.4	Mark Schilling	3.38.9
5000 meters	Martin Liquori	13.29.0 CR	Richard Buerkle	13.31.6	Ted Castaneda	13.33.2
10,000 meters	Frank Shorter	28.02.17 CR	Ted Castaneda	28.32.70	Garry Bjorklund	28.36.6
Marathon	Gary Tuttle	2.17.27	Kirk Pfeffer	2.19.07	Lionel Ortega	2.19.16
110 meters hurdles	Jerry Wilson	13.38 CR	Clim Jackson	13.69	Vance Roland	13.71
400 meters hurdles	Ralph Mann	48.74 CR	Jim Bolding	48.82	James King	49.22
3000 meters steeplechase	Randy Smith	8.28.2	Kent McDonald	8.28.8	Don Timm	8.33.2
3000 meters steeplechase	Randy Smith	8.28.2	Kent McDonald	8.28.8	Don Timm	8.33.2
5000 m walk	Ron Laird	22:08.6				

=== Men's field events ===
Event	Gold		Silver		Bronze	
High jump	Tom Woods	2.27 m (7 ft 5 1/4 in) CR	Rory Kotinek	2.23 m (7 ft 3 3/4 in)	Dwight Stones	2.23 m (7 ft 3 3/4 in)
Pole vault	Don Baird Australia; Terry Porter	5.33 m (17 ft 5 3/4 in)	Russ Rogers	5.33 m (17 ft 5 3/4 in)	Earl Bell	5.33 m (17 ft 5 3/4 in)
Long jump	Arnie Robinson	8.05 m (26 ft 4 3/4 in)	Danny Seay	7.93 m (26 ft 0 in)	Randy Williams	7.93 m (26 ft 0 in)
Triple jump	Anthony Terry	16.71 m (54 ft 9 3/4 in)	Caleb Abdul Rahman	16.64 m (54 ft 7 in)	Tommy Haynes	16.47 m (54 ft 1/4 in)
Shot put	Al Feuerbach	21.00 m (68 ft 10 3/4 in)	Terry Albritton	20.52 m (67 ft 3 3/4 in)	Peter Shmock	20.07 m (65 ft 10 in)
Discus throw	John Powell	63.65 m (208 ft 9 in)	Mac Wilkins	63.40 m (208 ft 0 in)	Ken Stadel	62.58 m (205 ft 3 in)
Hammer throw	Boris Djerassi	67.92 m (222 ft 10 in)	Lawrence Hart	67.54 m (221 ft 7 in)	Steve DeAutremont	66.60 m (218 ft 6 in)
Javelin throw	Richard George	83.18 m (272 ft 10 in)	Robert Wallis	81.71 m (268 ft 0 in)	Sam Colson	81.15 m (266 ft 2 in)
Pentathlon	Mike Riddle	3643 pts				
All-around decathlon	Lloyd Sigler	7596 pts				
Decathlon	Fred Samara	8061	Craig Brigham	7971	Steve Gough	7918

=== Women's track events ===
Event	Gold		Silver		Bronze	
100 meters	Rosalyn Bryant	11.6	Martha Watson	11.6	Ranaye Bowen	11.6
200 meters	Debra Armstrong	23.0	Rosalyn Bryant	23.2	Pamela Jiles	23.5
400 meters	Debra Sapenter	51.6 =AR	Lorna Forde Barbados; Robin Campbell	52.6; 52.7	Patricia Helms	53.3
800 meters	Madeline Manning	2.00.5 AR	Kathy Weston	2.02.9	Cheryl Toussaint	2.03.1
1500 meters	Julie Brown	4.13.5 CR	Janice Merrill	4.14.4	Cindy Bremser	4.15.0
3000 meters	Lynn Bjorklund	9.10.6 AR	Cindy Bremser	9.13.4	Peggy Neppel	9.17.4
Marathon	Kim Merritt	2.46.14.8	Miki Gorman	2.53.02.8	Gayle Barron	2.57.22
100 meters hurdles	Jane Frederick	13.8	Debbie LaPlante	13.9	Pat Donnelly	14.3
400 meters hurdles	Debbie Esser	57.3 AR	Pat Collins Barbados; Mary Ayers	57.4; 59.3	June Smith Trinidad and Tobago; Debbie Vetter	59.4; 1:00.5

=== Women's field events ===
Event	Gold		Silver		Bronze	
High jump	Joni Huntley	1.83 m (6 ft 0 in)	Susan Hackett	1.78 m (5 ft 10 in)	Pam Spencer	1.75 m (5 ft 8 3/4 in)
Long jump	Martha Watson	6.48 m (21 ft 3 in)	Kathy McMillan	6.26 m (20 ft 6 1/4 in)	Sherron Walker	6.23 m (20 ft 5 1/4 in)
Shot put	Maren Seidler	16.22 m (53 ft 2 1/2 in)	Denise Wood	14.97 m (49 ft 1 1/4 in)	Mary Jacobson	14.96 m (49 ft 3/4 in)
Discus throw	Jean Roberts Australia; Jan Svendsen	48.69 m (159 ft 8 in); 47.47 m (155 ft 8 in)	Joan Pavelich Canada; Linda Langford	47.22 m (154 ft 11 in); 46.18 m (151 ft 6 in)	Monette Driscoll	45.67 m (149 ft 10 in)
Javelin throw	Kathy Schmidt	63.88 m (209 ft 6 in) AR	Sherry Calvert	54.51 m (178 ft 10 in)	Karin Smith	54.30 m (178 ft 1 in)
Pentathlon	Jane Frederick	4676	Diane Jones Canada; Gale Fitzgerald	4442; 4334	Sandi Tyler	3884

== See also ==
- United States Olympic Trials (track and field)
