= 1976 United States Olympic trials (track and field) =

1976 United States Olympic track and field trials
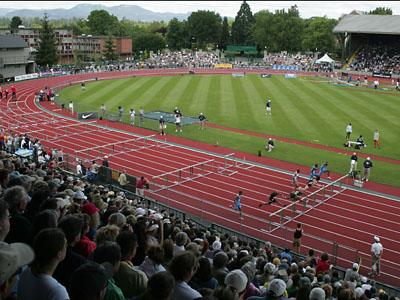
- Hayward Field years later
- Dates: June 19–27, 1976
- Host city: Eugene, Oregon, U.S.
- Venue: Hayward Field
- Level: Senior
- Type: Outdoor

The 1976 United States Olympic trials for track and field were held June 19–27 at Hayward Field in Eugene, Oregon. These were the last organized by the Amateur Athletic Union (AAU); the Amateur Sports Act of 1978 was passed two years later which formed the new national governing body for the sport of track and field, The Athletics Congress. The 1970s was a transitional period when amateur athletes were seeking ways to be paid for their athletic efforts. Many athletes had sacrificed their eligibility to run professionally, others made the attempt and were in transition to regain their amateur status.

The trials for the men's marathon was held in Eugene a month earlier on May 22. The longest race for women at the 1976 Olympics was the 1500 meters, but eventual Olympic marathoners Joan Benoit, Julie Brown, and Francie Larrieu all participated.

For the first time, the men's 50 km race walk was not part of the Olympics, but returned in 1980.

High school athletes Houston McTear, Dwayne Evans, Chandra Cheeseborough, Sheila Ingram, Rhonda Brady, Paula Girven, and Kathy McMillan were successful in these trials.

== Men's results ==
Key: ≠ Athlete without "A" standard, not selected.

=== Men track events ===
Event	Gold		Silver		Bronze	
100 meters Wind +1.8	Harvey Glance	10.11	Houston McTear	10.16	Steve Riddick	10.18
200 meters Wind +1.7	Millard Hampton	20.10	Dwayne Evans	20.22	Mark Lutz	20.42
400 meters	Maxie Parks	45.58	Fred Newhouse	45.76	Herm Frazier	45.84
800 meters	Rick Wohlhuter	1:44.78	James Robinson	1:45.86	Mark Enyeart	1:46.28
1500 meters	Rick Wohlhuter	3:36.47	Matt Centrowitz	3:36.70	Mike Durkin	3:36.72
5000 meters	Dick Buerkle	13:26.60	Duncan MacDonald	13:29.46	Paul Geis	13.38.46
10,000 meters	Frank Shorter	27:55.45	Craig Virgin	27:59.43	Garry Bjorklund	28:03.74
110 m hurdles Wind +2.2	Charles Foster	13.44w (13.2h)	Willie Davenport	13.52w	James Owens	13.57w
400 m hurdles	Edwin Moses	48.30 NR	Quentin Wheeler	48.65	Mike Shine	49.33
3000 m s'chase	Doug Brown	8.27.39	Henry Marsh	8.27.42	Mike Roche	8.32.70
20K racewalk	Todd Scully	1:25:29	Ron Laird	1:25:44	Larry Walker	1:25:57
Marathon	Frank Shorter	2:11:51	Bill Rodgers	2:11:59	Don Kardong	2:13:54

=== Men field events ===
Event	Gold		Silver		Bronze	
High jump	Bill Jankunis	2.28 m (7 ft 5 3/4 in)	Dwight Stones	2.25 m (7 ft 4 1/2 in)	James Barrineau	2.25 m (7 ft 4 1/2 in)
Pole vault	Dave Roberts	5.70 m (18 ft 8 1/4 in) WR	Earl Bell	5.50 m (18 ft 1/2 in)	Terry Porter	5.50 m (18 ft 1/2 in)
Long jump	Arnie Robinson	8.37 m (27 ft 5 1/2 in)w +3.5	Larry Myricks	8.26 m (27 ft 1 in)w +3.8	Randy Williams	8.18 m (26 ft 10 in)w +2.7
Triple jump	James Butts	17.29 m (56 ft 8 1/2 in)w +2.9	Tommy Haynes	17.02 m (55 ft 10 in)w +2.8	Rayfield Dupree	17.01 m (55 ft 9 1/2 in)w +2.8
Shot put	Al Feuerbach	21.12 m (69 ft 3 1/4 in)	George Woods	21.10 m (69 ft 2 1/2 in)	Pete Shmock	20.96 m (68 ft 9 in)
Discus throw	Mac Wilkins	68.32 m (224 ft 1 in)	John Powell	67.34 m (220 ft 11 in)	Jay Silvester	64.74 m (212 ft 4 in)
Hammer throw	Larry Hart	67.84 m (222 ft 6 in)	Ted Bregar	67.48 m (221 ft 4 in)	Alvin Jackson	66.60 m (218 ft 6 in)
Javelin throw	Sam Colson	84.18 m (276 ft 2 in)	Richard George	82.22 m (269 ft 9 in)	Anthony Hall	81.58 m (267 ft 7 in)
Decathlon	Caitlyn Jenner (Note: Known as Bruce Jenner until her gender transition in 2015.)	8538 WR	Fred Dixon	8294	Fred Samara	8004

== Women's results ==
=== Women track events ===
Event	Gold		Silver		Bronze	
100 meters Wind +1.95	Brenda Morehead	11.08	Chandra Cheeseborough	11.13	Evelyn Ashford	11.22
200 meters Wind +2.3	Brenda Morehead	22.49w	Chandra Cheeseborough	22.64w	Debra Armstrong	22.74w
400 meters	Sheila Ingram	52.69	Debra Sapenter	52.73	Rosalyn Bryant	52.76
800 meters	Madeline Jackson	1:59.81 NR	Cyndy Poor	2:00.55	Kathy Weston	2:00.73
1500 meters	Cyndy Poor	4:07.32 NR	Jan Merrill	4:07.35	Francie Larrieu	4:08.08
100 m hurdles Wind +2.3	Rhonda Brady	13.25w	Deby LaPlante	13.27	Pat Donnelly	13.36

=== Women field events ===
Event	Gold		Silver		Bronze	
High jump	Paula Girven	1.86 m (6 ft 1 in)	Joni Huntley	1.84 m (6 ft 1/4 in)	Pam Spencer	1.81 m (5 ft 11 1/4 in)
Long jump	Kathy McMillan	6.78 m (22 ft 2 3/4 in)w	Sherron Walker	6.61 m (21 ft 8 in)w	Martha Watson	6.55 m (21 ft 5 3/4 in)w
Shot put	Maren Seidler	16.25 m (53 ft 3 3/4 in)	Kathy Devine	15.54 m (50 ft 11 3/4 in)	Mary Jacobson	14.71 m (48 ft 3 in)
Discus throw	Lynne Winbigler	50.65 m (166 ft 2 in)	Jan Svendsen	50.27 m (164 ft 11 in)	Monette Driscoll	48.93 m (160 ft 6 in)
Javelin throw	Kate Schmidt	65.04 m (213 ft 4 in)	Sherry Calvert	58.40 m (191 ft 7 in)	Karin Smith	57.22 m (187 ft 8 in)
Pentathlon	Jane Frederick	4622	Gale Fitzgerald	4417	Marilyn King	4374
