= 1974 USA Outdoor Track and Field Championships =

- Dates: June 21–23
- Host city: Westwood, California; Bakersfield, California; United States
- Venue: Drake Stadium University of California, Los Angeles; Memorial Stadium, Bakersfield College

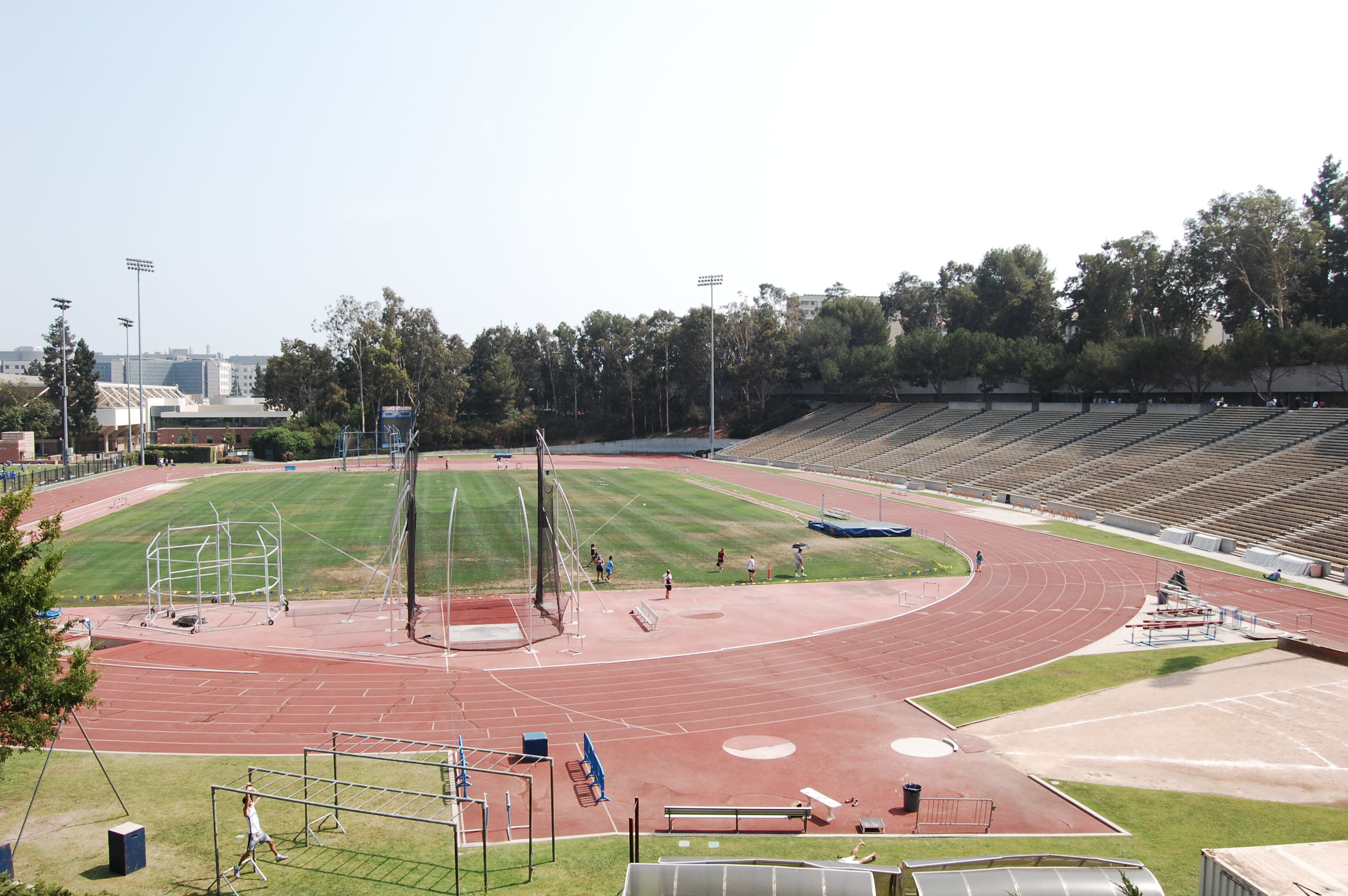
Drake Stadium

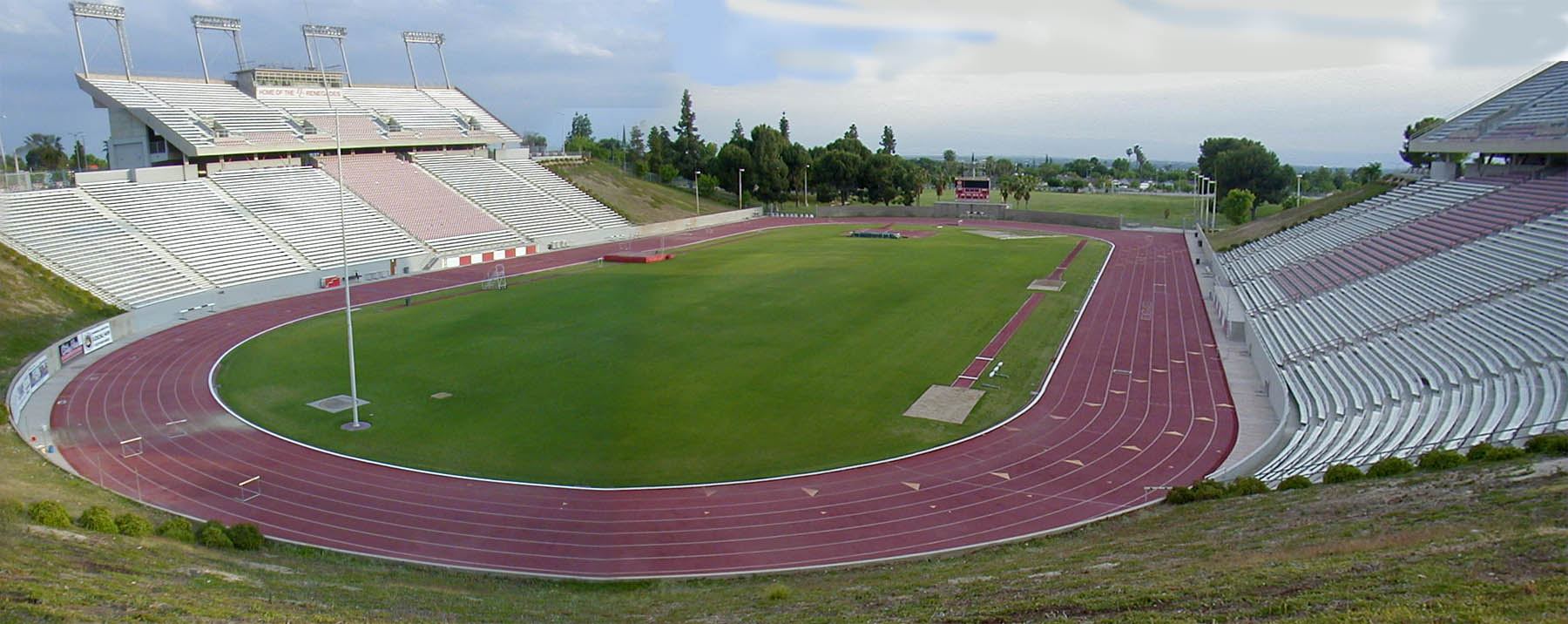
Bakersfield Memorial Stadium

The 1974 USA Outdoor Track and Field Championships men's competition took place between June 21–23 at Drake Stadium on the campus of University of California, Los Angeles in Westwood, California. The women's division held their championships separately a little over a hundred miles north in Bakersfield at Memorial Stadium, which had hosted the men's division the previous year. The two schools had also shared hosting the championships in 1970 with reverse roles. The women's division would compete at imperial distances, the last time that measurement system was used in the American championships. Since 1975's edition, the USATF rulebook has called for metric values.

== Results ==
=== Men track events ===
Event	Gold		Silver		Bronze	
100 meters	Steve Williams	9.9 =WR	Donald Quarrie; Jamaica; Reggie Jones	10.0 10.1	Steve Riddick	10.1
200 meters	Donald Quarrie; James Gilkes; Guyana; Jamaica; Reggie Jones	20.5 20.7 20.7	Steve Williams	20.7	John Pettus	21.1
400 meters	Maurice Peoples	45.2	Darwin Bond	45.6	Terry Erickson	45.7
800 meters	Rick Wohlhuter	1.43.9 AR	John Walker; New Zealand; James Robinson	1.45.3 1.45.7	Mark Robinson	1.46.0
1500 meters	Rodney Dixon; New Zealand; Thomas Byers	3.37.5 CRm 3.37.9	John Hartnett; Ireland; Michael Slack	3.38.1 3.38.5	Bruce Fischer	3.38.6
5000 meters	Richard Buerkle	13.33.4 CRm	Frank Shorter	13.34.6	Don Kardong	13.35.6
10000 meters	Frank Shorter	28.16.0	Richard Buerkle	28.25.0	Garry Bjorklund	28.28.4
Marathon	Ronald Wayne	2.18.52	John Vitale	2.18.53	Terry Ziegler	2.19.26
110 meters hurdles	Charles Foster	13.4	Thomas Hill	13.5	Willie Davenport	13.5
400 meters hurdles	Jim Bolding	48.9	Ralph Mann	49.5	James King	49.5
3000 meters steeplechase	Jim Johnson	8.28.8	Douglas Brown	8.28.8	Michael Manley	8.29.0
5000 meters racewalk	John Knifton	22:23.0v	Larry Young	22:31.2	Bill Ranney	22:34.8

=== Men field events ===
Event	Gold		Silver		Bronze	
High jump	Dwight Stones	2.21 m (7 ft 3 in)	Reynaldo Brown	2.19 m (7 ft 2 in)	Mark Branch	2.19 m (7 ft 2 in)
Pole vault	Dave Roberts	5.33 m (17 ft 5 3/4 in)	Terry Porter	5.33 m (17 ft 5 3/4 in)	Roland Carter	5.18 m (16 ft 11 3/4 in)
Long jump	James (Bouncy) Moore	8.07 m (26 ft 5 1/2 in)	Arnie Robinson	8.03 m (26 ft 4 in)	Henry Jackson; Jamaica; Danny Seay	7.95 m (26 ft 3/4 in)w 7.92 m (25 ft 11 3/4 in)
Triple jump	John Craft	16.58 m (54 ft 4 3/4 in)w	Charlton Ehizuelen; Nigeria; James Butts	16.45 m (53 ft 11 1/2 in) 16.34 m (53 ft 7 1/4 in)w	Tommy Haynes	16.32 m (53 ft 6 1/2 in)
Shot put	Al Feuerbach	21.58 m (70 ft 9 1/2 in)	George Woods	21.40 m (70 ft 2 1/2 in)	Jesse Stuart	20.44 m (67 ft 1/2 in)
Discus Throw	John Powell	65.50 m (214 ft 10 in) MR	Mac Wilkins	62.71 m (205 ft 8 in)	Rickard Drescher	60.86 m (199 ft 8 in)
Hammer throw	Steve DeAutremont	69.04 m (226 ft 6 in)	Peter Farmer; Australia; Tom Gage	68.20 m (223 ft 9 in) 67.59 m (221 ft 9 in)	Bill Shuff	66.62 m (218 ft 6 in)
Javelin throw	Sam Colson	85.55 m (280 ft 8 in)	Fred Luke	84.83 m (278 ft 3 in)	Anthony Hall	80.92 m (265 ft 5 in)
Pentathlon	Jack Carter	3403 pts				
Decathlon	Bruce Jenner	8245 MR	Jeff Bennett	7913	Fred Samara	7852

=== Women track events ===
Event	Gold		Silver		Bronze	
100 yards	Ranaye Bowen	10.4	Alice Annum; Ghana; Matteline Render	10.4 10.4	Janet Brown	10.5
220 yards	Alice Annum; Ghana; Fran Sichting	23.1 23.4	Rhonda McManus	23.7	Rosalyn Bryant	23.7
440 yards	Debra Sapenter	52.2 =WR	Sheila Choates	53.6	Marilyn Neufville; Jamaica; Gwen Norman	53.6 53.9
880 yards	Mary Decker	2.05.2	Robin Campbell	2.05.9	Liane Swegle	2.07.4
1 Mile	Julie Brown	4.45.1	Judy Graham	4.46.0	Karen McHarg	4.50.2
2 Miles	Lynn Bjorklund	10.11.1	Clare Choate	10.21.1	Marlene Harewicz	10.31.0
Marathon	Judy Shapiro-Ikenberry	2.55.17	Marilyn Paul	2.58.44	Peggy Lyman	2.58.55
100 m hurdles	Patricia Johnson	13.2 CR	Mamie Rallins	13.3	Modupe Oshikoya; Nigeria; Debbie Lansky	13.5 13.6
400 m hurdles	Andrea Bruce; Jamaica; Michele Hopper	59.7 CR 59.8	Janice Lester	60.0	Linda Wright	61.0
Mile walk	Sue Brodock	7:29.7 NR	Ellen Minkow	7:43.1	Esther Marquez	7:53.6

=== Women field events ===
Event	Gold		Silver		Bronze	
High jump	Joni Huntley	1.83 m (6 ft 0 in)	Pam Spencer	1.73 m (5 ft 8 in)	Cindy Gilbert	1.73 m (5 ft 8 in)
Long jump	Martha Watson	6.49 m (21 ft 3 1/2 in)	Willye White	6.39 m (20 ft 11 1/2 in)	Sherron Walker	6.28 m (20 ft 7 in)
Shot put	Maren Seidler	16.53 m (54 ft 2 3/4 in) MR	Cynthia Reinhardt	14.73 m (48 ft 3 3/4 in)	Jan Svendsen	14.52 m (47 ft 7 1/2 in)
Discus Throw	Joan Pavelich; Canada; Linda Langford	53.01 m (173 ft 11 in) 50.01 m (164 ft 0 in)	Monette Driscoll	49.30 m (161 ft 8 in)	Jean Roberts; Australia; Cynthia Reinhardt	46.76 m (153 ft 4 in)
Javelin throw	Kathy Schmidt	61.92 m (203 ft 1 in) MR	Lynn Cannon	58.55 m (192 ft 1 in)	Sherry Calvert	57.10 m (187 ft 4 in)
Pentathlon	Mitzi McMillin	4051	Marilyn King	4034	Lisa Chiavario	3743

== See also ==
- United States Olympic Trials (track and field)
