= Rayfield Dupree =

American triple jumper (born 1953)

Personal information
- Nationality: American
- Born: April 2, 1953 (age 73) Los Angeles, United States

Sport
- Sport: Athletics
- Event: Triple jump

Rayfield Dupree (born April 2, 1953) is an American former track and field athlete, who competed in the men's triple jump at the 1976 Summer Olympics.

== Competition ==
Rayfield Dupree triple jump results
Competition	Year	Rank	Mark	Ref
NCAA Outdoor	1973	4	15.93	
U.S. Outdoor	1975	4	16.43	
U.S. Outdoor	1976	4	16.60	
U.S. Olympic trials	1976	3	17.01 w	
Olympic Games	1976	12	16.23 (16.50 Q)	
Ohio Valley Conference Indoor	1977	1	15.79 i	
U.S. Outdoor	1977	6	16.55	
U.S. Outdoor	1977	6	16.55	
U.S. Outdoor	1978	2	16.46 w	

Dupree was a junior at California State University, Long Beach when he came fourth in the 1973 NCAA Championships. He represented the U.S. Army in the 1976 Olympic trials. The following season he was at Middle Tennessee State University and became Ohio Valley Conference indoor champion. He qualified for the 1980 Olympic trials but withdrew.

In June 1981 Dupree was working as a mail carrier in Los Angeles when an irate customer attacked him with lye. He was hospitalised for three weeks and off work for three months. He recovered to compete in the 1982 U.S. Outdoor Championships, driving from Los Angeles to Knoxville, Tennessee.

== Post competition ==
In 1993 Dupree founded the Team World Track club near his home in Moreno Valley, California. In 2005 he pleaded guilty to lewd and lascivious conduct in connection with two 13-year-old girls he was coaching there.

== Family ==
In 1982 Dupree was married with three children. His daughter Gaylian is the mother of football player De'Anthony Thomas, for whom Rayfield was a childhood sprint coach.

== Sources ==
- Hymans, Richard (2008), The History of the United States Olympic Trials (PDF), USA Track & Field, archived from the original (PDF) on December 20, 2019
