= Middle Tennessee Blue Raiders track and field =

American college track and field team

- University: Middle Tennessee State University
- Head coach: Keith Vroman
- Conference: C-USA
- Location: Murfreesboro, Tennessee
- Outdoor track: Dean Hayes Track and Soccer Field
- Nickname: Blue Raiders
- Colors: Royal blue and white

The Middle Tennessee Blue Raiders track and field team is the track and field program that represents Middle Tennessee State University. The Blue Raiders compete in NCAA Division I as a member of the Conference USA. The team is based in Murfreesboro, Tennessee, at the Dean Hayes Track and Soccer Field.

The program is coached by Keith Vroman. The track and field program officially encompasses four teams because the NCAA considers men's and women's indoor track and field and outdoor track and field as separate sports.

Triple jumper Barry McClure was the first multiple-time NCAA champion for the Blue Raiders. He was said to have started a dynasty of triple and long jumpers at the program.

== Postseason ==
As of August 2025, a total of 32 men and 10 women have achieved individual first-team All-American status for the team at the Division I men's outdoor, women's outdoor, men's indoor, or women's indoor national championships (using the modern criteria of top-8 placing regardless of athlete nationality).

First team NCAA All-Americans
Team	Championships	Name	Event	Place	Ref.
Men's	1969 Outdoor	Dennis Bandy	4 × 400 meters relay	7th	
Men's	1969 Outdoor	Terry Scott	4 × 400 meters relay	7th	
Men's	1969 Outdoor	David Wyatt	4 × 400 meters relay	7th	
Men's	1969 Outdoor	Jerry Singleton	4 × 400 meters relay	7th	
Men's	1970 Outdoor	Barry McClure	Triple jump	4th	
Men's	1971 Indoor	Barry McClure	Triple jump	2nd	
Men's	1971 Outdoor	Tommy Haynes	Long jump	8th	
Men's	1971 Outdoor	Barry McClure	Triple jump	2nd	
Men's	1972 Indoor	Tommy Haynes	Long jump	4th	
Men's	1972 Indoor	Barry McClure	Triple jump	1st	
Men's	1972 Outdoor	Barry McClure	Triple jump	2nd	
Men's	1973 Indoor	Barry McClure	Triple jump	1st	
Men's	1973 Indoor	Tommy Haynes	Triple jump	4th	
Men's	1973 Outdoor	Barry McClure	Triple jump	2nd	
Men's	1974 Indoor	Tommy Haynes	Triple jump	1st	
Men's	1974 Outdoor	Tommy Haynes	Long jump	4th	
Men's	1974 Outdoor	Tommy Haynes	Triple jump	3rd	
Men's	1976 Indoor	Sheikh Faye	Long jump	4th	
Men's	1976 Outdoor	Sheikh Faye	Long jump	2nd	
Men's	1976 Outdoor	Jimmy Washington	Triple jump	5th	
Men's	1977 Indoor	Rayfield Dupress	Triple jump	4th	
Men's	1977 Outdoor	Sheikh Faye	Long jump	5th	
Men's	1977 Outdoor	John Dodoo	Long jump	7th	
Men's	1979 Indoor	Greg Artis	Long jump	2nd	
Men's	1979 Outdoor	Greg Artis	Long jump	5th	
Men's	1979 Outdoor	John Dodoo	Triple jump	8th	
Men's	1980 Indoor	Greg Artis	Long jump	3rd	
Men's	1980 Indoor	Andre Kirnes	Long jump	5th	
Men's	1980 Outdoor	Greg Artis	Long jump	4th	
Men's	1980 Outdoor	Andre Kirnes	Long jump	8th	
Men's	1981 Indoor	Barry Gambrell	4 × 400 meters relay	6th	
Men's	1981 Indoor	Mike Davidson	4 × 400 meters relay	6th	
Men's	1981 Indoor	Gary Mitchell	4 × 400 meters relay	6th	
Men's	1981 Indoor	Tim Johnson	4 × 400 meters relay	6th	
Men's	1981 Indoor	Greg Artis	Long jump	3rd	
Men's	1981 Indoor	Greg Artis	Triple jump	4th	
Men's	1981 Outdoor	Greg Artis	Long jump	4th	
Men's	1982 Indoor	Floyd James	4 × 400 meters relay	4th	
Men's	1982 Indoor	Herb Newton	4 × 400 meters relay	4th	
Men's	1982 Indoor	Gary Mitchell	4 × 400 meters relay	4th	
Men's	1982 Indoor	Tim Johnson	4 × 400 meters relay	4th	
Men's	1982 Indoor	Tim Johnson	Distance medley relay	3rd	
Men's	1982 Indoor	Herb Newton	Distance medley relay	3rd	
Men's	1982 Indoor	John Davis	Distance medley relay	3rd	
Men's	1982 Indoor	Joe O'Loughlin	Distance medley relay	3rd	
Men's	1982 Indoor	Orestes Meeks	Long jump	4th	
Men's	1982 Outdoor	Andre Kirnes	Long jump	8th	
Men's	1982 Outdoor	Eddie Loyd	Triple jump	2nd	
Men's	1983 Outdoor	Andre Kirnes	Long jump	6th	
Men's	1984 Indoor	Dwight Johnson	Long jump	5th	
Men's	1991 Indoor	Roland McGhee	Long jump	6th	
Men's	1992 Indoor	Roland McGhee	Long jump	5th	
Men's	1992 Outdoor	Roland McGhee	Long jump	2nd	
Men's	1993 Indoor	Roland McGhee	55 meters	6th	
Men's	1993 Indoor	Roland McGhee	Long jump	2nd	
Men's	1994 Indoor	Roland McGhee	55 meters	8th	
Men's	1994 Indoor	Roland McGhee	Long jump	3rd	
Women's	1994 Indoor	Dionne Rose	Long jump	4th	
Women's	1994 Indoor	Jacqui Brown	Long jump	8th	
Women's	1994 Indoor	Jacqui Brown	Triple jump	4th	
Men's	1994 Outdoor	Roland McGhee	Long jump	2nd	
Women's	1994 Outdoor	Dionne Rose	Long jump	4th	
Men's	1996 Indoor	Christian Nsiah	200 meters	7th	
Men's	1999 Indoor	Christian Nsiah	60 meters	7th	
Men's	1999 Outdoor	Ron Bramlett	110 meters hurdles	4th	
Women's	2000 Outdoor	Andreja Ribac	Triple jump	6th	
Men's	2001 Indoor	Jasper Demps	60 meters hurdles	6th	
Men's	2001 Outdoor	Godfrey Herring	400 meters	5th	
Men's	2002 Indoor	Mardy Scales	60 meters	8th	
Men's	2002 Indoor	Godfrey Herring	400 meters	7th	
Men's	2002 Outdoor	Godfrey Harring	400 meters	6th	
Men's	2003 Indoor	Mardy Scales	60 meters	6th	
Men's	2003 Outdoor	Mardy Scales	100 meters	1st	
Men's	2003 Outdoor	Victor Okorie	400 meters hurdles	8th	
Men's	2003 Outdoor	D.J. Spann	4 × 100 meters relay	3rd	
Men's	2003 Outdoor	Mardy Scales	4 × 100 meters relay	3rd	
Men's	2003 Outdoor	Brad Orr	4 × 100 meters relay	3rd	
Men's	2003 Outdoor	Pedro Holliday	4 × 100 meters relay	3rd	
Men's	2004 Indoor	Mardy Scales	60 meters	2nd	
Men's	2004 Indoor	Garland Martin	60 meters hurdles	8th	
Men's	2004 Outdoor	Mardy Scales	100 meters	3rd	
Men's	2004 Outdoor	Xavier Darden	4 × 100 meters relay	6th	
Men's	2004 Outdoor	Mardy Scales	4 × 100 meters relay	6th	
Men's	2004 Outdoor	Wesley Dupar-Scott	4 × 100 meters relay	6th	
Men's	2004 Outdoor	J.J. Sturm	4 × 100 meters relay	6th	
Men's	2006 Outdoor	Linnie Yarbrough	110 meters hurdles	7th	
Men's	2006 Outdoor	Orlando Reid	200 meters	6th	
Men's	2007 Outdoor	Orlando Reid	100 meters	8th	
Men's	2007 Outdoor	Orlando Reid	200 meters	3rd	
Men's	2007 Outdoor	Juan Walker	4 × 100 meters relay	5th	
Men's	2007 Outdoor	Orlando Reid	4 × 100 meters relay	5th	
Men's	2007 Outdoor	Sean Waller	4 × 100 meters relay	5th	
Men's	2007 Outdoor	Samuel Abade	4 × 100 meters relay	5th	
Men's	2007 Outdoor	Juan Walker	Long jump	6th	
Women's	2008 Indoor	Sarah Nambawa	Triple jump	8th	
Women's	2009 Indoor	Sarah Nambawa	Triple jump	2nd	
Men's	2009 Outdoor	Stanley Gbagbeke	Long jump	2nd	
Women's	2009 Outdoor	Sarah Nambawa	Triple jump	3rd	
Men's	2010 Outdoor	Stanley Gbagbeke	Long jump	2nd	
Women's	2010 Outdoor	Sarah Nambawa	Triple jump	2nd	
Women's	2010 Outdoor	Brittany Cox	Shot put	8th	
Men's	2011 Indoor	Noah Akwu	200 meters	6th	
Women's	2012 Indoor	Ann Dudley	High jump	6th	
Women's	2013 Indoor	Ann Dudley	High jump	6th	
Men's	2013 Outdoor	Eliud Rutto	800 meters	7th	
Men's	2013 Outdoor	Cordairo Golden	Triple jump	4th	
Men's	2014 Indoor	Cordairo Golden	Triple jump	8th	
Men's	2014 Outdoor	Eliud Rutto	800 meters	5th	
Men's	2014 Outdoor	Cordairo Golden	Triple jump	3rd	
Men's	2015 Outdoor	John Ampomah	Javelin throw	2nd	
Men's	2016 Indoor	Eliud Rutto	800 meters	2nd	
Men's	2016 Outdoor	Sampson Laari	800 meters	5th	
Men's	2016 Outdoor	Eliud Rutto	800 meters	7th	
Men's	2016 Outdoor	John Ampomah	Javelin throw	3rd	
Men's	2017 Indoor	Sampson Laari	Mile run	3rd	
Women's	2017 Indoor	Abike Egbeniyi	800 meters	8th	
Women's	2018 Outdoor	Abike Egbeniyi	800 meters	2nd	
Men's	2019 Indoor	Fabian Edoki	Long jump	6th	
Men's	2019 Outdoor	Kigen Chemadi	3000 meters steeplechase	3rd	
Men's	2021 Outdoor	Kigen Chemadi	3000 meters steeplechase	1st	
Men's	2022 Indoor	Omamuyowi Erhire	High jump	7th	
Women's	2022 Indoor	Eusila Chepkemei	Mile run	6th	
Women's	2022 Outdoor	Eusila Chepkemei	1500 meters	8th	
Women's	2022 Outdoor	Abigail Kwarteng	High jump	2nd	
Women's	2022 Outdoor	Esther Isa	Triple jump	8th	

== See also ==
- Category:Middle Tennessee Blue Raiders men's track and field athletes (14)
- Category:Middle Tennessee Blue Raiders women's track and field athletes (7)
