= Women's heptathlon world record progression =

The following table shows the women's heptathlon world record progression starting in 1978 and ratified by the IAAF from June 1981. The first score in the table indicates the score using the tables in use at the time, the second score is based on tables currently in use.

== Record progression ==
Athlete	Venue	Date	Points	Adjusted points
(West Germany) Liesl Albert	Dillingen	October 8, 1978	5831	5654
(East Germany) Andrea Findeis	Zabrze	September 16, 1979	5784	5691
(Soviet Union) Nadezhda Vinogradova	Frunze	September 30, 1979	5848	5671
(Netherlands) Silvia Barlag	Longwy	September 30, 1979	5878	5730
(Soviet Union) Tatyana Shpak	Donetsk	May 30, 1980	5922	5777
(Soviet Union) Nina Golovina	Pyatigorsk	July 13, 1980	6074	5930
(Soviet Union) Yekaterina Gordiyenko	Odessa	September 14, 1980	6144	6095
(United States) Jane Frederick	Walnut	April 24, 1981	6166	6104
(Soviet Union) Nadezhda Vinogradova	Kislovodsk	May 6, 1981	6212	6181
(East Germany) Ramona Neubert	Halle	May 24, 1981	6621	6670
(East Germany) Ramona Neubert	Kiev	June 28, 1981	6716	6788
(East Germany) Ramona Neubert	Halle	June 20, 1982	6772	6845
(East Germany) Ramona Neubert	Moscow	June 19, 1983	6836	6935
(East Germany) Sabine Paetz	Potsdam	May 6, 1984	6867	6946
(United States) Jackie Joyner	Moscow	July 7, 1986	7148	7148
(United States) Jackie Joyner	Houston	August 2, 1986	7158	7158
(United States) Jackie Joyner-Kersee	Indianapolis	July 17, 1988	7215	7215
(United States) Jackie Joyner-Kersee	Seoul	September 24, 1988	7291	7291

== See also ==
- Men's heptathlon world record progression
