= Athletics at the 1976 Summer Olympics – Men's triple jump =

Men's triple jump at the Games of the XXI Olympiad
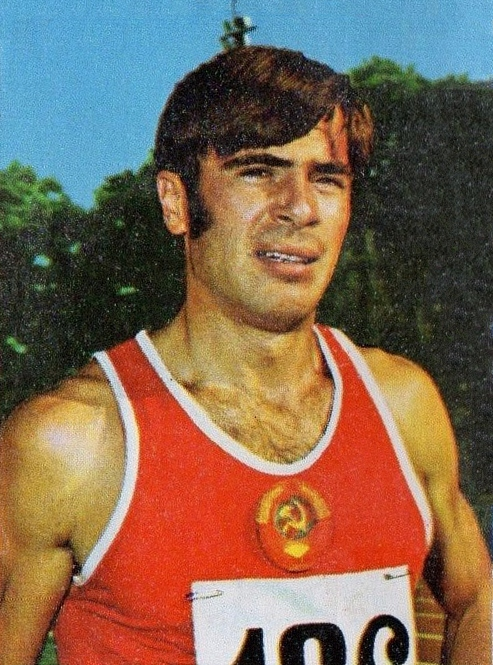
- Viktor Saneyev (1972)
- Venue: Olympic Stadium
- Date: 29 July 1976 (qualifying); 30 July 1976 (final)
- Competitors: 25 from 18 nations
- Winning distance: 17.29

Medalists
1st place, gold medalist(s)		Viktor Saneyev; Soviet Union
2nd place, silver medalist(s)		James Butts; United States
3rd place, bronze medalist(s)		João Carlos de Oliveira; Brazil

The men's triple jump event at the 1976 Summer Olympics in Montreal, Quebec, Canada, had an entry list of 25 competitors, with two qualifying groups (25 jumpers) before the final (12) took place on Friday July 30, 1976. The top twelve and ties, and all those reaching 16.30 metres advanced to the final. The qualification round was held in Thursday July 29, 1976. The maximum number of athletes per nation had been set at 3 since the 1930 Olympic Congress.

The event was won by Viktor Saneyev of the Soviet Union, the first man to win three gold medals in the triple jump. He matched Vilho Tuulos of Finland in 1920 through 1928 as the only men to have three medals of any color in the event (Tuulos had one gold, two bronze). It was the seventh consecutive Games that the Soviet Union had reached the podium, and third consecutive gold medal for the Soviets, in the event. James Butts's silver put the United States on the men's triple jump podium for the first time since 1928. Brazil won a triple jump medal for the third consecutive Games with João Carlos de Oliveira's bronze.

== Summary ==
Three world record holders came to compete; João Carlos de Oliveira was the current record holder at the 1975 Pan American Games; two time defending champion Viktor Saneyev and Pedro Pérez who had taken Saneyev's record and held it for a year until Saneyev took it back.

All but two finalists hit the 16.30 automatic qualifier, de Oliveira the leader in that round. In the final, Pérez took the early lead with a 16.81 in the first round, James Butts was in second at 16.69, while Saneyev and de Oliveira fouled. In the second round, Saneyev landed a 16.71 but was only third as Butts improved to 16.76. The order switched in the third round when Saneyev jumped 17.06 and de Oliveira went 16.85 to take over the top two spots. In the fourth round, Butts leaped into the lead with 17.18. Saneyev jumped the winner 17.29 m (56 ft 8 1/2 in) in the fifth round. On his final attempt, de Oliveira improved to 16.90, but couldn't improve enough to change his medal from bronze.

Saneyev became the third man to win the same event three times in a row, after John Flanagan in the hammer throw and Al Oerter in the discus.

== Background ==
This was the 18th appearance of the event, which is one of 12 athletics events to have been held at every Summer Olympics. Half of the finalists from the 1972 Games returned: two-time gold medalist Viktor Saneyev of the Soviet Union, bronze medalist (and 1968 silver medalist) Nelson Prudêncio of Brazil, fourth-place finisher Carol Corbu of Romania, seventh-place finisher Michał Joachimowski of Poland, tenth-place finisher Bernard Lamitié of France, and twelfth-place finisher Toshiaki Inoue of Japan. Saneyev was the favorite to win a third gold, with world record holder João Carlos de Oliveira of Brazil his most significant challenger.

Antigua and Barbuda made its first appearance in the event. The United States competed for the 18th time, having competed at each of the Games so far.

== Competition format ==
The competition used the two-round format introduced in 1936. In the qualifying round, each jumper received three attempts to reach the qualifying distance of 16.30 metres; if fewer than 12 men did so, the top 12 (including all those tied) would advance. In the final round, each athlete had three jumps; the top eight received an additional three jumps, with the best of the six to count.

== Records ==
Prior to the competition, the existing world and Olympic records were as follows.

World record	João Carlos de Oliveira (BRA)	17.89	Mexico City, Mexico	15 October 1975
Olympic record	Viktor Saneyev (URS)	17.39	Mexico City, Mexico	17 October 1968

No new world and Olympic records were set during this competition.

== Schedule ==
All times are Eastern Daylight Time (UTC-4)

Date	Time	Round
Thursday, 29 July 1976	10:00	Qualifying
Friday, 30 July 1976	15:00	Final

== Results ==
=== Qualifying ===
Rank	Athlete	Nation	1	2	3	Distance	Notes
1	João Carlos de Oliveira	Brazil	16.81	—	—	16.81	Q
2	Viktor Saneyev	Soviet Union	16.77	—	—	16.77	Q
3	Wolfgang Kolmsee	West Germany	16.68	—	—	16.68	Q
4	Tommy Haynes	United States	16.62	—	—	16.62	Q
5	James Butts	United States	16.55	—	—	16.55	Q
6	Jiří Vyčichlo	Czechoslovakia	X	16.00	16.54	16.54	Q
7	Pedro Pérez	Cuba	16.51	—	—	16.51	Q
8	Rayfield Dupree	United States	14.29	16.20	16.50	16.50	Q
9	Eugeniusz Biskupski	Poland	16.46	—	—	16.46	Q
10	Bernard Lamitié	France	16.39	—	—	16.39	Q
11	Pentti Kuukasjärvi	Finland	16.31	—	—	16.31	Q
12	Carol Corbu	Romania	16.30	—	—	16.30	Q
13	Michał Joachimowski	Poland	16.08	16.29	X	16.29	
14	Nélson Prudêncio	Brazil	16.18	16.22	14.79	16.22	
15	Valentyn Shevchenko	Soviet Union	16.15	15.97	16.00	16.15	
16	Toshiaki Inoue	Japan	16.06	X	15.99	16.06	
17	Janoš Hegediš	Yugoslavia	15.50	16.03	16.00	16.03	
18	Ramón Cid	Spain	16.00	X	X	16.00	
19	Armando Herrera	Cuba	15.98	X	X	15.98	
20	Andrzej Sontag	Poland	15.72	15.30	15.82	15.82	
21	Maxwell Peters	Antigua and Barbuda	14.94	X	X	14.94	
22	Apostolos Kathiniotis	Greece	14.13	X	X	14.13	
23	Mohamed Al-Bouhairi	Saudi Arabia	13.85	X	X	13.85	
—	Aston Moore	Great Britain	X	X	X	No mark	
—	Phil Robins	Bahamas	X	X	X	No mark	

=== Final ===
Rank	Athlete	Nation	1	2	3	4	5	6	Distance
1st place, gold medalist(s)	Viktor Saneyev	Soviet Union	X	16.71	17.06	X	17.29	X	17.29
2nd place, silver medalist(s)	James Butts	United States	16.69	16.76	14.80	17.18	16.55	16.61	17.18
3rd place, bronze medalist(s)	João Carlos de Oliveira	Brazil	X	16.15	16.85	14.91	16.69	16.90	16.90
4	Pedro Pérez	Cuba	16.81	16.24	16.48	16.47	X	X	16.81
5	Tommy Haynes	United States	15.46	X	16.68	16.78	16.71	16.71	16.78
6	Wolfgang Kolmsee	West Germany	16.23	X	16.68	16.58	16.31	X	16.68
7	Eugeniusz Biskupski	Poland	15.91	X	16.49	X	15.79	X	16.49
8	Carol Corbu	Romania	16.07	16.18	16.43	X	16.00	X	16.43
9	Jiří Vyčichlo	Czechoslovakia	X	X	16.28	Did not advance			16.28
10	Pentti Kuukasjärvi	Finland	16.15	16.14	16.23	Did not advance			16.23
11	Bernard Lamitié	France	X	16.23	15.93	Did not advance			16.23
12	Rayfield Dupree	United States	X	16.23	15.90	Did not advance			16.23
