= Milan Tiff =

American track and field athlete

Medal record

Men's athletics

Representing United States

Pan American Games
Bronze medal – third place	1975 Mexico City	Triple jump

Milan Tiff (born July 5, 1949) is an American former track and field athlete who specialized in the triple jump. He earned a bronze medal in the event at the 1975 Pan American Games. A contemporary of Kareem Abdul-Jabbar at UCLA, Tiff was ranked in the world top ten in 1975 and 1977.

During the mid-1970s, Tiff converted to Islam. He briefly competed under the name Caleb Abdul Rahman, appearing as such at the 1975 Pan American Games, the 1976 Olympic trials, and the national championships in 1976 and 1977. However, he returned to using his birth name, Milan Tiff, by the 1978 USA Outdoor Track and Field Championships. Tiff later explained that his name change was not religiously motivated, stating, "I just did it because it sounded cool".

== Early life and career ==
A childhood victim of Osgood-Schlatter disease, he did not walk until he was age 8. He went on to become the first American to jump 57 feet while winning his second USA Outdoor Track and Field Championships.

Growing up in Shaker Heights, Ohio, June 1968, set a state of Ohio high school triple jump record at 49’-11”. 1969, he first attended college at Miami University Ohio. March 1970 (in Detroit) Tiff won the NCAA championship triple jump. Later, switching to UCLA to work with Jim Bush, where he was a teammate of John Smith and Dwight Stones. While there he won the 1973 NCAA Championship in the Triple Jump. Later he joined Bush as an assistant coach After completing UCLA, he was a member of the Southern California Striders.

Tiff was known for his unusual training methods, including visiting the Sierra Nevada annually to chase deer and bears in preparation for the triple jump. During commuting hours at busy Los Angeles intersections, he would triple jump across the crosswalk rather than walk.

A talented painter, he spends many hours working on art. He approaches many other activities with an artistic perspective. Like several athletes of his era he acted in the 1982 movie Personal Best. Later he trained Emilio Estevez for two of his mid-1990s film roles. He has continued to train athletes at UCLA including many NBA players. In 1991 he wrote a book on his own form of exercise called "Traveling light: an original form of exercise". He was later credited on James Ingram's album "It's Real" as "giving us the map."

In 1979, he was inducted into the Mt. SAC Relays Hall of Fame.

Tiff's father Benjamin ran on the East Technical High School (Cleveland) sprint relay team with Jesse Owens.

Tiff's sister, Michele Tiff-Hill was a 1984 Olympic Trials Qualifier in the Marathon.

== Olympic Trials ==
Tiff placed 10th at the 1972 trials, and competed in the rounds at the 1976 trials.

== Masters ==
Tiff expected to retire from the sport after the Olympics, but continues to jump in Masters athletics events into his 60s. He has held several Masters World Records as he has passed through the age groups. In 2009, small gust of wind is all that prevented him from equalling the M60 world record.

As a Masters athlete, Tiff officially has three Masters World Records plus one Masters American Record; and have meet records at the Masters SCA, Masters West Region, Striders Meet of Champions, and the Grandfather Games.
