= Wolfgang Kolmsee =

German triple jumper

Personal information
- Nationality: German
- Born: 25 September 1954 (age 71)

Sport
- Sport: Athletics
- Event: Triple jump

Wolfgang Kolmsee (born 25 September 1954) is a retired (West) German triple jumper.

He was born in Oberhausen. He finished eighth at the 1975 European Indoor Championships, fourth at the 1976 European Indoor Championships, sixth at the 1976 Summer Olympics, no-marked at the 1977 European Indoor Championships, finished sixth at the 1977 World Cup and eleventh at the 1980 European Indoor Championships.

Kolmsee became West German champion in 1976, also winning national silver medals in 1974, 1977, 1981 and 1982. Indoors he became West German champion in 1975, 1976, 1977 and 1978. He represented the clubs Salamander Kornwestheim, VfB Stuttgart and LAC Quelle Fürth. His personal best jump was 16.68 metres (1976).
