= Judy Shapiro-Ikenberry =

American long-distance runner

Personal information
- Nationality: American
- Born: Judy Shapiro; September 3, 1942 (age 83) Brooklyn, New York
- Home town: Sunland-Tujunga, California
- Education: University of California Riverside
- Spouse: Dennis Ikenberry

Sport
- Sport: Track and field athletics
- Event: Marathon
- Coached by: Dennis Ikenberry

Achievements and titles
- National finals: 1974 US National Marathon Women's Champion; 1977 US National 50-Mile Track Ultramarathon Champion

Judy Shapiro-Ikenberry (born September 3, 1942) is a former long-distance runner. Shapiro-Ikenberry won the 1967 Amateur Athletic Union (AAU) Las Vegas Marathon, and was the first USA Marathon Championships winner for women in 1974, at the AAU National Women's Marathon. She also won the 1977 US National 50-Mile Track Ultramarathon Championship.

== Early and personal life ==
She was born Judy Shapiro in Brooklyn, New York, to Jewish parents, and had two older brothers. Her father was an aeronautics engineer. Her family moved to Sunland-Tujunga, north-east of Los Angeles, in Southern California when she was one year old.

In 1965 she married Dennis Ikenberry, her coach, and in the late 1960s they adopted two children and moved to Salt Lake City, Utah; in 1971 they moved to San Bernardino, California. Shapiro-Ikenberry attended the University of California Riverside, and was Class of 1965. She now lives in Crestline, California.

== Running career ==
She had a 5th-place finish at the 1960 United States Olympic Trials in the 800 metres in Abilene, Texas. There, at 17 years of age she was the youngest runner.

At the 1961 USA National Track & Field Championships, she finished fourth in the 800m and fifth in the 400 metres.

She competed in the 1961 Maccabiah Games in Israel, winning a bronze medal in the 800 m.

Shapiro-Ikenberry won the 1967 Amateur Athletic Union (AAU) Las Vegas Marathon, in 3:38.

In 1973, she won the Mission Bay Marathon in San Diego, California, in 3:00:05. In 1974 Shapiro-Ikenberry again won the race, at the 1974 USA Outdoor Track and Field Championships, this time in 2:54:08.

Shapiro-Ikenberry was the first USA Marathon Championships winner for women in 1974, at the AAU National Women's Marathon in San Mateo, California, with a time of 2:55:17.

In 1977, she won the US National 50-Mile Track Ultramarathon Championship.

== Halls of Fame ==
Shapiro-Ikenberry was inducted into the University of California Riverside Athletics Hall of Fame in 1992. In 2013, she was inducted into the Multi-Ethnic Sports Hall of Fame. She was inducted into the Southern California Jewish Sports Hall of Fame in 2020.
