= Phil Robins =

Bahamian triple jumper

Personal information
- Nationality: Bahamian
- Born: 10 September 1954 (age 71)

Sport
- Sport: Athletics
- Event: Triple jump

Phil Robins (born 10 September 1954) is a Bahamian athlete. He competed in the men's triple jump at the 1976 Summer Olympics.

Competing for the Southern Illinois Salukis track and field team, Robins won the 1976 NCAA Division I Outdoor Track and Field Championships in the triple jump.
