= Mohamed Al-Bouhairi =

Saudi Arabian triple jumper

Personal information
- Nationality: Saudi Arabian
- Born: 4 April 1952 (age 74)

Sport
- Sport: Athletics
- Event: Triple jump

Mohamed Al-Bouhairi (born 4 April 1952) is a Saudi Arabian athlete. He competed in the men's triple jump at the 1976 Summer Olympics.
