= Houston McTear =

American sprinter

Personal information
- Born: February 13, 1957 Baker, Florida, U.S.
- Died: November 1, 2015 (aged 58) Stockholm, Sweden
- Height: 5 ft 7 in (1.70 m)
- Weight: 165 lb (75 kg)
- Spouse: Linda Haglund

Sport
- Sport: Running
- Event: Sprints
- Club: Muhammad Ali Track Club

Achievements and titles
- Personal bests: 60 yd: 6.05; 60 m: 6.54; 100 yd: 9.30

Houston McTear (February 12, 1957 – November 1, 2015) was an American sprinter, who emerged from desperate poverty in the Florida Panhandle to become an international track star in the mid-1970s.

McTear rated in the top 10 in the 100 meters for the United States from 1975 to 1980, but he was stronger at shorter distances, including 60 meters. His 1978 world record in the 60 meters (6.54 s) stood up until it was broken by Ben Johnson in 1986. McTear ran a 6.38 in 1980, but that mark has been invalidated due to "questionable timing". If that time were to stand, it would still be the second best all time performance. However, his meteoric rise was effectively ended by the American-led boycott of the 1980 Summer Olympics.

== Early promise ==
Born and raised in Okaloosa County, Florida, McTear attended Baker High School and won state titles in the 100 and 220 yards four times, the only Florida high school athlete ever to do so. He recorded a 9.0 mark in the 100-yard dash as a high schooler in a preliminary heat of the Florida state championship meet in Winter Park, but the world record time was not recognized because it was hand-timed. The time remains the NFHS national high school record in the discontinued event; he was the 1975 High School Athlete of the Year, as selected by Track and Field News.

At the 1976 U.S. Olympic Trials in Eugene, Oregon, McTear ran a 10.16 sec over 100 meters (109.36 yards), at the time the fastest ever run under any condition by a Florida high school athlete. It remains fourth-best on the all-time list, only surpassed by Jeffery Demps, Marvin Bracy, and Trayvon Bromell, all born well over a decade after McTear's performance.

== International stardom ==
McTear qualified for the 1976 Summer Olympics in Montreal in the 100 meters, but an achilles tendon injury suffered in the Olympic Trials forced him to withdraw from the Olympic field. He was replaced by Johnny "Lam" Jones, who finished sixth. The American 4 × 100 meter relay team won the gold medal, led by McTear's rival Harvey Glance.

McTear appeared on the cover of Sports Illustrated in 1978, and qualified for the U.S. Olympic team in 1980, but the U.S. boycott of the 1980 Summer Olympics prevented his participation. From there he fell into drug use and was homeless for three years during the 1980s. He attempted a comeback in the early 1990s and won the 60 meters at the Swedish Indoor Championships in 1990 with a time of 6.68s.

== Personal ==
McTear was married to the Swedish sprinter Linda Haglund. They lived in Sweden and owned a sports consulting business.

McTear died of lung cancer on November 1, 2015, aged 58, in Stockholm. He was survived by three children and his widow, Haglund, who died on November 21, 2015, only three weeks after McTear's death, also from cancer.

== Rankings ==
McTear was ranked among the best in the world and the US in his event from 1975 to 1980, according to Track and Field News.

Year	Event	World rank	US rank
1975	100 meters	10th	3rd
1976	100 meters	-	6th
1977	100 meters	2nd	1st
1978	100 meters	-	6th
1979	100 meters	4th	3rd
1980	100 meters	-	9th

Awards
Preceded by Willie Smith	Track & Field News High School Boys Athlete of the Year; 1975	Succeeded by Dwayne Evans
