= Athletics at the 1975 Summer Universiade – Women's pentathlon =

The women's pentathlon event at the 1975 Summer Universiade was held at the Stadio Olimpico in Rome on 21 September.

== Results ==
| Rank | Athlete | Nationality | 100m H | SP | HJ | LJ | 200m | Points | Notes |
|---|---|---|---|---|---|---|---|---|---|
| 1st place, gold medalist(s) | Jane Frederick | United States | 14.00 | 13.63 | 1.76 | 6.11 | 25.12 | 4442 | |
| 2nd place, silver medalist(s) | Đurđa Fočić | Yugoslavia | | | | | | 4423 | |
| 3rd place, bronze medalist(s) | Olga Rukavishnikova | Soviet Union | 14.53 | 11.79 | 1.81 | 6.21 | 25.37 | 4313 | |
| 4 | Liesel Albert | West Germany | | | | | | 4292 | |
| 5 | Iraida Stepanova | Soviet Union | 14.42 | 12.85 | 1.69 | 5.91 | 25.32 | 4214 | |
| 6 | Anna Włodarczyk | Poland | | | | | | 3927 | |
| 7 | Doris Langhans | Austria | | | | | | 3895 | |
| 8 | Silvia Baumann | Switzerland | | | | | | 3770 | |
| 9 | Sue Summers | Canada | | | | | | 3724 | |
| 10 | Viviane Nouailhetas-Simon | Brazil | | | | | | 3697 | |
| 11 | Alicia Goddard | Chile | | | | | | 3195 | |
