= Athletics at the 1977 Summer Universiade – Women's pentathlon =

Athletic event

The women's pentathlon event at the 1977 Summer Universiade was held at the Vasil Levski National Stadium in Sofia on 19 and 20 August.

== Results ==
The highest mark recorded in each event is highlighted in yellow

Rank	Athlete	Nationality	100m H	SP	HJ	LJ	800m	Points	Notes
1st place, gold medalist(s)	Valentina Dimitrova	Bulgaria	14.02	15.68	1.80	6.10	2:13.5	4630	
2nd place, silver medalist(s)	Jane Frederick	United States	13.24	15.26	1.78	5.98		4625	
3rd place, bronze medalist(s)	Yekaterina Smirnova	Soviet Union	13.23	15.53	1.78	6.12	2:19.4	4521	
4	Liesel Albert	West Germany	13.81				2:12.0	4337	
5	Olga Rukavishnikova	Soviet Union	14.04	12.28	1.78	6.17	2:23.6	4298	
6	Riki Lechner	Austria	13.67	14.08		6.10		4230	
7	Silvia Barlag	Netherlands	14.33		1.82	6.18		4220	
8	Anna Balatoni	Hungary	13.98			6.09		4205	
9	Breda Lorenci	Yugoslavia						4150	
10	Gloria Borfiga	France	14.23	11.62	1.78	5.53	2:28.4	4035	
11	Silvia Baumann	Switzerland	14.48					4003	
12	Jolanta Szuba	Poland						3891	
13	Mariana Kostova	Bulgaria						3711	
	Laurence Lebeau	France	13.67					DNF	
