= Don Kardong =

American long-distance runner and journalist

Personal information
- Full name: Donald Franklin Kardong
- Nationality: United States
- Born: December 22, 1948 (age 77)

Sport
- Sport: Long-distance running
- Events: Marathon, 5,000 meters
- College team: Stanford

Achievements and titles
- Olympic finals: 1976 Marathon (4th)

Donald Franklin Kardong (born December 22, 1948) is a noted runner and author from the United States. He finished fourth in the 1976 Olympic marathon in Montreal.

== Biography ==
Kardong graduated from Seattle Prep in 1967. He then went on to earn a bachelor's degree in psychology from Stanford University in 1971. While at Stanford, Kardong ran primarily the 5000 meters (3.1 miles). He finished third at the 1970 NCAA University Division cross country championships.

In 1974, Kardong earned another bachelor's degree in English and a teaching certificate from the University of Washington in Seattle. That same year, Kardong finished third in the 5000 meter race at the USA Outdoor Track and Field Championships with a time of 13:35.6. Afterwards, he taught at Spokane's Loma Vista Elementary from 1974 to 1977.

In 1976, the 6' 3" Kardong finished 3rd in the United States Olympic Trials held in Eugene, Oregon with a time of 2:13:54. That summer, in Montreal, Kardong finished a close fourth in the men's marathon at the 1976 Summer Olympics with a time of 2:11:15, just three seconds behind the bronze medal winner. In 1998, controversy arose concerning steroid use by East German athletes at the 1976 Summer Olympics, including gold medalist Waldemar Cierpinski. If medals were reassigned only to drug-free athletes, American Frank Shorter would take the Gold; followed by silver medalist Karel Lismont of Belgium and bronze medalist Don Kardong for Team USA.

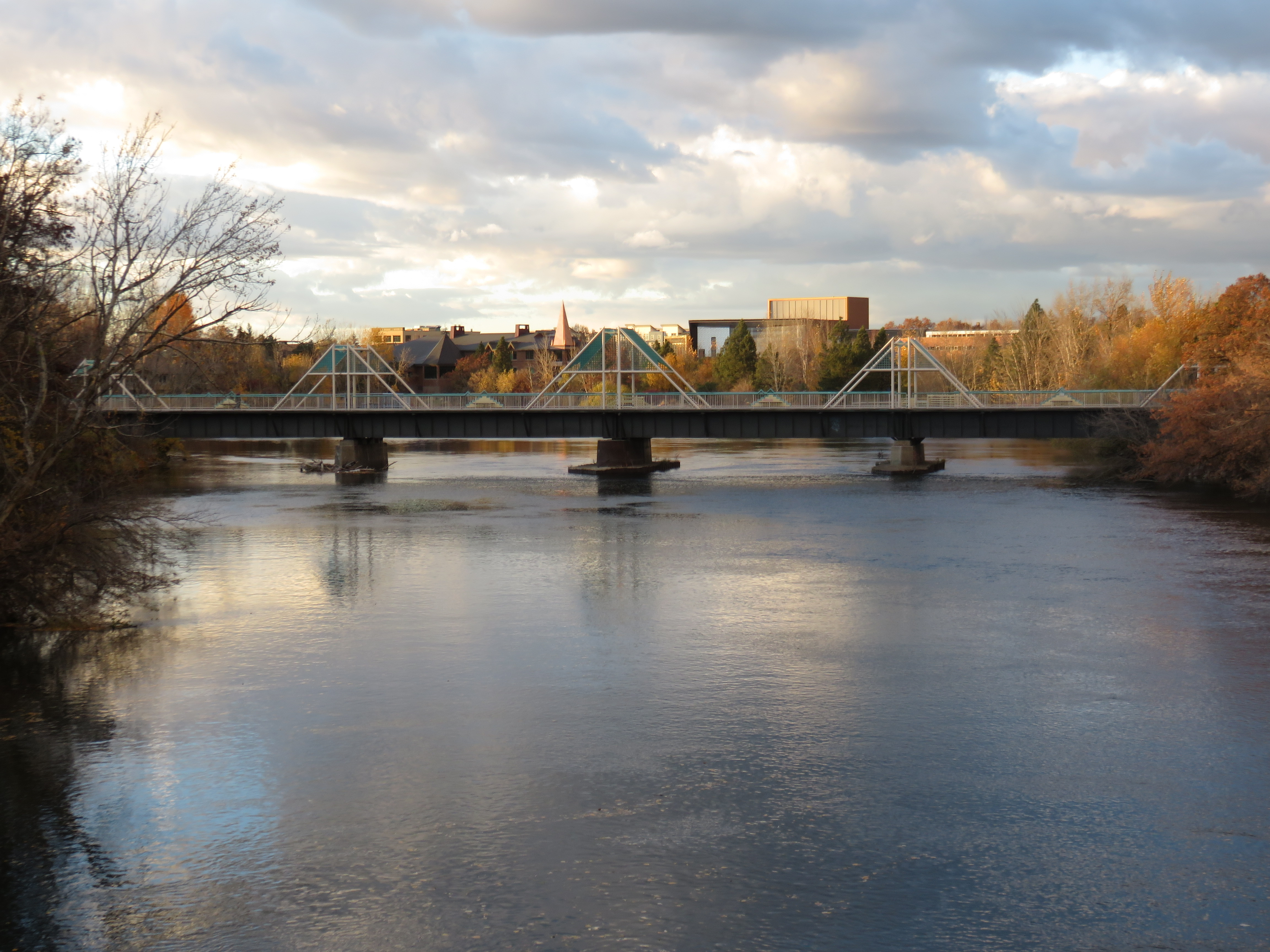
Don Kardong Bridge in 2018

From 1977 to 1986, Kardong owned and operated a retail running store in Spokane; he founded the Lilac Bloomsday Run (12 km (7.5 mi)) in 1977.

As a journalist and author, Kardong was a contributing editor for Running magazine from 1980 to 1983, and a contributing editor (1983–1985) and senior writer (1985–1987) for The Runner magazine. Since 1987, Kardong has been a contributing writer for Runner's World magazine.

Kardong was president of the Road Runners Club of America from 1996 to 2000. He served as executive director of the Children's Museum of Spokane from 2002 to 2004, and as race director of the Bloomsday run since then. Kardong started the Bloomsday race in Spokane - the community and a The Spokesman-Review newspaper article prompted the start of the race.

Spokane's Don Kardong Bridge was renamed for him.

Since 2012, Karadong's quote “Without ice cream, there would be darkness and chaos.” Has been on the pint labels of Vancouver ice-cream company Earnest Ice Cream .

== Achievements ==
Year	Competition	Venue	Position	Event	Notes
1972	West Valley Marathon	San Mateo, CA	1st	Marathon	2:18:06
1976	United States Olympic Trials	Eugene, Oregon	3rd	Marathon	2:13:54
1976	Peachtree Road Race	Atlanta, Georgia	1st	10K	29:14
1976	Olympic Games	Montréal, Canada	4th	Marathon	2:11:15
1977	New York City Marathon	New York City, New York	10th	Marathon	2:17:04
1978	Honolulu Marathon	Honolulu, Hawaii	1st	Marathon	2:17:05

== Books ==
- Thirty Phone Booths to Boston: Tales of a Wayward Runner (Macmillan Co., New York, 1985, selected an editor's choice of the American Library Association)
- Bloomsday: A City in Motion (Cowles Publishing, Spokane, WA, 1989)
- Hills, Hawgs and Ho Chi Minh (Keokee Co. Publishing, Sandpoint, ID, 1996)
