= Sharon Dabney =

American sprinter (born 1959)

Personal information
- Born: October 25, 1957 (age 69) Philadelphia, Pennsylvania, United States

Sport
- Sport: Track and field
Medal record
Representing United States
Pan American Games
Gold medal – first place	1979 San Juan	400 metres
Gold medal – first place	1979 San Juan	4x400 metre relay
Silver medal – second place	1975 Mexico City	4x400 metre relay
Summer Universiade
Bronze medal – third place	1983 Edmonton	4x400 metre relay

Sharon Dabney (born October 25, 1957) is a retired American track and field athlete.

== Career ==
She was the 1979 Pan American Games Champion at 400 metres in a photo finish over June Griffith. She also was part of the United States gold medal-winning 4 × 400 metres relay team. Four years earlier, she was part of the silver medal-winning team as a 16 year old.

She was sixth place in the United States Olympic Trials in 1976. Her 51.55 in 1977 while still at John Bartram High School in Philadelphia was the second fastest 400 at the time, soon to be surpassed by the Howard sisters. At the time, before Title IX took effect, the high school had no athletic program for girls. She was the 1977 National Champion. At the 1980 Olympic Trials, she finished 4th behind Sherri Howard, Gwen Gardner and Denean Howard which should have put her on a likely medal winning relay team for the 1980 Summer Olympics. However that glory was not to be as for many athletes of her era she was left out of the Olympic by the 1980 Summer Olympics boycott. She did however receive one of 461 Congressional Gold Medals created especially for the spurned athletes. In 1984, she was unable to get out of the quarter-finals against Chandra Cheeseborough and Diane Dixon.

While studying at California State University, Los Angeles, she joined the three Howard sisters in setting the long-standing school record.
