= Roland McGhee =

American long jumper (born 1971)

Medal record

Men's athletics

Representing the United States

IAAF World Cup
Bronze medal – third place	1994 London	4 × 100 m relay

Roland McGhee (born October 15, 1971) is an American former long jumper. His personal record mark of 8.51 m (27 ft 11 in) ranks him in the all-time top 25 for the event, as of 2016. He was a two-time national champion, winning both outdoors and indoors in 1998. He represented his country at the 1995 World Championships in Athletics and the 1999 IAAF World Indoor Championships. Also, a sprinter, he was a bronze medallist in the relay at the 1994 IAAF World Cup.

== Career ==
Born in Flint, Michigan, he competed sporadically in track and field events at a young age before settling on the long jump. Growing up in Ohio, he attended Trotwood-Madison High School but did not win any state high school titles. He began his higher studies at Middle Tennessee State University and competed athletically for the Blue Raiders.

While at Middle Tennessee, he was the long jump runner-up at the National Collegiate Athletic Association (NCAA) level on three occasions, coming second at the 1993 NCAA Indoor Championships and the 1992 and 1994 NCAA Outdoors (to Erick Walder each time). He earned nine NCAA All-America honours during the period from 1990 to 1994. He also won four straight Ohio Valley Conference regional titles in the long jump and 100-meter dash, as well as three triple jump and two 200-meter dash titles. He was later inducted into the Blue Raiders Hall of Fame.

In terms of performance, McGhee entered the top ten jumpers nationally in the 1992 season with a jump of 8.06 m (26 ft 5 1/4 in). He improved to 8.38 m (27 ft 5 3/4 in) in the 1993 season, which ranked him sixth in the world, then moved up to fifth in 1994 with a new personal record of 8.47 m (27 ft 9 1/4 in). His career highest placings were fourth in the 1995 and 1998 seasons.

McGhee made his international debut for the United States at the 1994 IAAF World Cup. Teaming up with Mark Witherspoon, Marcel Carter, and Sam Jefferson, he took third in the 4 × 100-meter relay behind the British and African teams. This proved to be the only international podium finish of his career. He qualified for the 1995 World Championships in Athletics long jump after Carl Lewis withdrew, but failed to record a valid mark there after suffering a groin strain. He failed to get near eight metres at either the 1998 IAAF World Cup or the 1999 IAAF World Indoor Championships and was not close to a medal.

At the national level, he reached his first final in 1995 and finished in fourth place with a wind-assisted 8.35 m (27 ft 4 1/2 in). He was sporadic in major competitions, frequently adjusting his run-up approach, and often did not perform well. He did not record a valid mark at the 1996 United States Olympic Trials and was tenth at the 1997 USA Outdoor Track and Field Championships. He secured national titles at the USA Outdoor Track and Field Championships and USA Indoor Track and Field Championships in 1998. This was the last time he broke eight meters in a competition; however, he was fourth at the national championships in 1999 and 2002 and seventh at the 2000 United States Olympic Trials.

McGhee was a regular feature on the international professional track circuit in the late 1990s. He was a finalist at the IAAF Grand Prix Final in 1995, 1997, and 1999. His career best came in lower-level competition: at the Grande Premio Brasil Caixa de Atletismo, he jumped 8.51 m (27 ft 11 in) to move into the all-time top twenty athletes for the long jump. This remains the meeting record.

== Personal records ==
- Long jump – 8.51 m (1995)
- Long jump indoors – 8.28 m (1995)
- 55-meter dash – 6.45 sec (2001)
- 60-meter dash – 6.75 sec (1998)
- 100-meter dash – 10.41 sec (1994)
- 200-meter dash – 20.4 sec (1994)
- 4 × 100-meter relay – 39.33 sec (1994)

All information from All Athletics

== International competitions ==
Year	Competition	Venue	Position	Event	Notes
1994	IAAF World Cup	London, United Kingdom	3rd	4 × 100 m relay	39.33
1995	World Championships	Gothenburg, Sweden	—	Long jump	NM
1998	IAAF World Cup	Johannesburg, South Africa	5th	Long jump	7.79 m
1999	World Indoor Championships	Maebashi, Japan	9th	Long jump	7.84 m

== National titles ==
- USA Outdoor Track and Field Championships
  - Long jump: 1998
- USA Indoor Track and Field Championships
  - Long jump: 1998
