= George Malley (runner) =

American long-distance runner

Personal information
- Born: 28 July 1955 (age 71)

Sport
- Country: United States
- Sport: Long distance running
- Club: Penn State University, New Balance TC
Medal record
Representing the United States
IAAF World Cup
Bronze medal – third place	1977 Düsseldorf	3000 m steeplechase
World Cross Country Championships
Silver medal – second place	1981 Madrid	Team

George "Malmo" Malley (born July 28, 1955) is an American long-distance runner. He held American records in the 3000m steeplechase, 12 km, and half marathon.

== Early career ==
George Malley graduated from DuVal High School in Lanham, Maryland in 1973. He began competing in track and field and cross country his sophomore year. The DuVal High School cross-country team was ranked ninth and fifth nationally during his junior and senior years. He would set personal bests of 4:16.4 in the mile and 9:10.2 in the two mile.

Malley attended Penn State University, where he was a five-time All-America, and broke the American record in the steeplechase with his 8:22.54 at the 1977 AAU National Championships in Westwood, California. In the summer of 1977 he improved his mile personal best to 4:00.5 in Berlin, Germany.

He was ranked sixth in the world in the 3000m steeplechase event by Track & Field News for 1977

== Professional career ==
1978 Malley would run the steeplechase in 8:21.72, narrowly missing the new record of 8:21.55 set by Henry Marsh, and lowered his 1500-meter best to 3:40.21 just two days later.

1981 began with a New Years Day attempt on Bill Rodgers American Record at 15,000 m (43:39.8) in Palo Alto, CA. Malley would fall 3 seconds short with his 43:43.2 On March 15, in Cherry Hill, NJ, he would tie the existing 10 mile AR of 47:02 held by Herb Lindsay in a losing effort to fellow steeplechaser Mike Roche, who established the new mark with his 46:57. On March 21 he would set the American 12 km record with his 35:10 over a hilly course in Holyoke, MA. While preparing for the 1981 IAAF World Cross Country Championships Malley would tear his plantar fascia. He still ran the race, finishing 51st, helping the US team win the silver medal. It was the highest finish, and remains the lowest 6-man score by a US team in World Cross Country competition.

In 1982 he set the American record in the half-marathon, a 1:01:43 in Philadelphia on September 19, losing to Michael Musyoki of Kenya in world record time (1:01:35) and eclipsing the old world record of 1:01:47 set by Herb Lindsay. He followed that with a 2:13:29 marathon debut in New York City. He would run his lifetime best of 2:12:23 in Sacramento in 1985.

== Personal bests ==
Event	Time	Date	Location
1500 m	3:40.21	July 6, 1978	Göteborg, Sweden
1 mile	4:00.5	August 26, 1977	Berlin, Germany
3000 m steeplechase	8:21.72	July 4, 1978	Stockholm, Sweden
15000 m	43:43.2	January 1, 1981	Palo Alto, CA
12 km	35:10	March 21, 1981	Holyoke, MA
10 mile	47:02	March 15, 1981	Cherry Hill, NJ
Half marathon	1:01:43	September 19, 1982	Philadelphia, PA
Marathon	2:12:23	December 8, 1985	Sacramento, CA
