= Jiří Vyčichlo =

Jiří Vyčichlo (born 17 May 1946) is a retired Czechoslovak triple jumper.

He was born in Prague and represented the club Dukla Praha. He finished seventh at the 1974 European Championships, ninth at the 1975 European Indoor Championships, and ninth at the 1976 Olympic Games. He became Czechoslovak champion in 1968, 1971, 1973, 1974, 1976, 1977 and 1978; and Czechoslovak indoor champion in 1974, 1975 and 1978.

His personal best jump was 16.87 metres, achieved in May 1976 in Prague.
