= Nadezhda Vinogradova =

Soviet heptathlete

Personal information
- Born: May 1, 1958 (age 68)

Sport
- Sport: Track and field
Medal record
Representing Soviet Union
Summer Universiade
Silver medal – second place	1981 Bucharest	Heptathlon

Nadezhda Vinogradova (born May 1, 1958) is a former heptathlete from the Soviet Union, who was born as Nadezhda Miromanova. She set the second official world record in the women's heptathlon, gaining a total number of 6181 points on May 5, 1981, at a meet in Kislovodsk. She won the silver medal (6357 points) in the women's heptathlon at the 1984 Friendship Games.

Records
Preceded by (United States) Jane Frederick	Women's Heptathlon World Record Holder; May 5, 1981 — May 24, 1981	Succeeded by (East Germany) Ramona Neubert
