= Dwayne Evans =

American sprinter

Personal information
- Nationality: American
- Born: October 13, 1958 (age 67) Phoenix, Arizona, United States

Sport
- Sport: Running
- Event(s): 100 meters, 200 meters
- College team: Arizona State Sun Devils
Medal record
Men's Athletics
Representing the United States
Olympic Games
Bronze medal – third place	1976 Montreal	200 metres
World Cup
Gold medal – first place	1985 Canberra	4×100 metres relay

Dwayne Eugene Evans (born October 13, 1958) is an American athlete who mainly competed in the 200 meters.

He competed for the United States in the 1976 Summer Olympics held in Montreal, Quebec, Canada, where he won the bronze medal in the men's 200 metres event. That same year, he had just graduated from South Mountain High School in Phoenix, Arizona. That year he also set the still standing NFHS national high school records in the 220 yard dash at 20.5. The federation converted record-keeping to metric distances shortly afterward. He was Track and Field News "High School Athlete of the Year" in 1976. He continued to run, achieving his PR of 20.08 in 1987.

Evans won the British AAA Championships title in the 100 metres event at the 1987 AAA Championships and finished runner-up to John Regis in the 200 metres.

Evans is currently coaching Track at South Mountain High School in Phoenix, Arizona, and has twin daughters who are track athletes at Texas Tech University.

Awards
Preceded by Houston McTear	Track & Field News High School Boys Athlete of the Year; 1976	Succeeded by Renaldo Nehemiah
Records
Preceded by (United States) Marshall Dill	Men's World Junior Record Holder, 200 metres 22 June 1976 – 11 May 1985	Succeeded by (United States) Roy Martin
