= Peter Shmock =

American shot putter (born 1950)

- Born: April 29, 1950 (age 76); Detroit, Michigan
- Education: Bachelor's in Social Science; Certified Strength and Conditioning Specialist¬Æ
- Alma mater: University of Oregon
- Occupations: Coach and Personal Trainer
- Employer: Zum Health Club
- Known for: Olympic athlete, Seattle Mariners coach, founder of Zum Health Club
- Height: 6 ft 2 in (1.88 m)
- Title: Founder, Zum Health Club
- Spouse: Patrice Donnelly (divorced)
- Sports career
- Sport: Shot put
- College team: Oregon Ducks
- Coached by: Bill Bowerman
- Website: petershmock.com

Peter Shmock (/smɒk/ SMOK; Peter Carlton "Pete" Shmock; born April 29, 1950, in Detroit, Michigan) is a retired American track and field athlete, primarily known for throwing the shot put, and former Seattle Mariners coach. Currently Shmock is a personal trainer at Zum (stylized "ZUM"), a Seattle health club he founded in 2002.

== High school and college athletics ==
Shmock went by "Pete" throughout his high school, college, and Olympic shot-put career. In 1968, while attending San Dieguito High School Academy in Encinitas, California, Shmock won first place in the California State Championships and threw 62-1 3/4 to finish fifth at the Golden West Invitational.

From 1969 to 1972 Pete Shmock competed on the University of Oregon's track and field team, the Ducks, coached by Olympic team coach Bill Bowerman. Shmock did exceptionally well at the university's annual Twilight Meet, telling a reporter, "'This is the first meet this year I've really got psyched for.'" In 1970 he broke 60 feet for the first time in his college career, and in 1971 he threw a personal best of 63-2 3/4. He threw 64-11 1/2 in 1972, setting a new personal best and qualifying him for the Olympic trials.

Ranking sixth in the U.S., Shmock did not travel to Munich for the 1972 Summer Olympics. He finished second in shot put in the NCAA that year, and he threw a lifetime best in the hammer throw of 166-11.

Shmock graduated from the University of Oregon with a bachelor's in social science in 1973.

After college, Pete Shmock competed with the Southern California Striders (also known as the Tobias Striders) in the Amateur Athletic Union (AAU). He ranked among the top six shot putters in the AAU and the U.S. Nationals from 1974 to 1980.

== Olympic shot put ==
On June 5, 1976, Shmock threw his lifetime best, 69-3, at the University of Oregon's historic Hayward Field in Eugene. Fifteen days later, on the first day of the U.S. track and field trials, he qualified for the 1976 Summer Olympics team.Video on YouTube @ 27:17

Shmock told reporters, "'Qualifying is a very unpleasant thing to go through. It's a mental thing, and I'm glad I didn't have to take more than one throw.'" He expressed concern about over-exerting himself on the lengthy walk to get dinner in the Olympic village, saying, "'I'm just going to keep my feet up and try to rest.'"

He placed ninth in men's shot put at Montreal, a result he later described as "far worse than I'd hoped."

The summer of '76 was not all disappointment for Pete Shmock. He met Olympic hurdler Patrice Donnelly in 1975, and the pair's July romance in Montreal was well-publicized at the time. They married in August 1976, though they later divorced.

In 1977, both Shmock and Donnelly were training full-time for the 1980 Summer Olympics in Moscow. Without employment, they were struggling to pay the bills, and Shmock was frustrated by the "poor coaching, inadequate facilities, and financial insecurity" faced by athletes once they left college.

At March 1979's USSR-USA Track Meet in Fort Worth, Texas, Shmock threw 65-10 to place second, between the USSR's first-place Vladimir Kiselyov and third-place Aleksandr Baryshnikov. Such goodwill gestures between the two superpowers came to an abrupt halt on December 27, 1979, when the Soviets invaded Afghanistan. On April 12, 1980, the United States Olympic Committee voted to officially boycott the Moscow games.

Despite the boycott, Shmock was back at the University of Oregon's Hayward Field in Eugene for the U.S. Olympic track and field trials on June 27, 1980. Pete Shmock "surprisingly" beat Al Feuerbach and Brian Oldfield with a throw of 68-4, securing his spot on the 1980 team. Shmock was considered the top U.S. shot putter, though there was speculation that some "likely medal winners ... skipped the trials" or stopped training as intensely once the boycott was made official.

On August 25, 1980, Shmock came in second, behind Oldfield, at London's international Golden Mile meet. This was his final shot-put competition.

Pete Shmock appeared on the cover of the November 1981 issue of Power & Fitness for Every Body beside the headline "Life After The Olympic Boycott: Shot Putter Pete Shmock Turns To Surfing."

== Coaching career ==
In 1983 Shmock joined the Seattle Mariners as a weight-training coach, and from 1994 until 1999 he was also a conditioning coach for the male and female dancers of Pacific Northwest Ballet.

With the Mariners' blessing, Shmock was soon appearing in training videos and publishing fitness advice. He made a weight training video with pitcher Mark Langston in 1989, and in 1990 Mariners head trainer Rick Griffin wrote the introduction for Weight Ball Training, a paperback Peter Shmock co-authored with Eric Swenson. Shmock was cast in two Professional Sports Training for Kids videos: Football with Dan Fouts in 1990 and Baseball with Ken Griffey Jr. in 1991.

The media were also seeking words of wisdom from Peter Shmock. Asked about third baseman Darnell Coles in 1990, strength and conditioning coach Shmock said, "'His body is bigger but he's just as flexible as before.'" The Washington Post quoted him in a story on medicine balls that was picked up by a wire service and republished in Ontario, Canada.

Even though he rubbed elbows with Ken Griffey Jr., Lou Piniella, and other baseball elites, Shmock made time to teach classes to ordinary Seattleites. In 1994, he taught Heart of the Athlete with Johan Morgen and Outdoor Gym, Euro-Sport Circuit, and Elite Edge. Incorporating tai chi, yoga, and medicine balls, Shmock created fitness routines for people "'35 to 60 who want to live without pain and to have the strength and energy to perform ... the movements that they encounter most often day to day.'"

As a coach, Shmock was full of contradictions. A "muscular and lithe" fitness instructor, he disdained both being "called a 'personal trainer'" and "any focus on fitness for the sake of appearance." He spoke about "training that 'went inside,'" needing to "relax to allow things to happen", and "the mind-body relationship", but dispelled any New Age connotations, saying, "I'm not interested in being anyone's guru."

As a result of the 1994–95 Major League Baseball strike, the Seattle Mariners cut 17 staff members including Peter Shmock on September 24, 1994. Shmock was training advisor for the Seattle Reign in 1997, and he continued working with Pacific Northwest Ballet dancers and teaching classes at Woodland Park and at Sound Mind & Body.

In 1998, The Seattle Times listed Peter Shmock as one of the city's top fitness experts and quoted him saying, in his typical mellow style, "I just do a smattering of things that make the most sense for my energy." By 2000 Shmock had "a national reputation as a teacher", and the one-minute and five-minute exercise ball routine he developed for The Seattle Times was republished in Wichita, Kan.

== ZUM Health Club ==
Peter Shmock opened Zum, his "long-awaited new health club" on May 1, 2002.

Located at Fifth Avenue and Bell Street in the Belltown section of Seattle's Denny Regrade neighborhood, ZUM originally occupied a "1930s-era brick" building, "formerly the longtime home to . . . American Games." ZUM rented the space from Clise Properties under an 18-year lease agreement, and Shmock worked with Rocky Rochon Design and BjarkoSerra Architects to build out $643,000 of tenant improvements.

Rochon and BjarkoSerra helped select the site, and they added a second-floor mezzanine to bring the space to 7,338 square feet. They created a nightclub-like charcoal exterior with "massive steel-plate doors", hung a cut-metal sign simply saying "ZUM", and replaced a wall with a garage door to let in air and light on sunny days. Inside, they added a crystal chandelier, a 5-by-15-foot sand pit, a climbing rope, an "all-white quiet room", and a Zen rock garden. Zum was stocked with regular weight-lifting and circuit-training equipment plus balance beams, fitness balls, and 35 medicine balls – Shmock's specialty.

In 2003, Shmock's fitness expertise was quoted in The Seattle Times, Next: A Magazine by Amer Sports (makers of Wilson and Precor fitness equipment), and Seattle Weekly. From July 2004 to February 2007 Certified Strength and Conditioning Specialist¬Æ (C.S.C.S.¬Æ) Peter Shmock wrote a monthly column called "The Life Athlete" for the neighborhood Belltown Messenger, and he contributed to the book Conditioning for Outdoor Fitness: Functional Exercise and Nutrition for Every Body.

ZUM was threatened in 2004 when the Seattle Monorail Project (SMP) planned to condemn the health club's building and redevelop the site as a monorail station. The monorail said "just compensation" for condemnation only applied to the owner of the property, Clise, and it would only pay ZUM's "relocation fees and up to $50,000 in related expenses." Standing to lose his nearly $900,000 investment in tenant improvements, founder Peter Shmock hired attorney Bruce P. Babbitt and began litigation.

Luckily for ZUM, before monorail construction began, "Seattle voters pulled the plug" in November 2005. On April 10, 2006, SMP sold the American Games/ZUM building to Anmar Co. for $2.3 million, well above their $1.5 million purchase price.

Meanwhile, Peter Shmock continued to earn praise and press for his fitness programs incorporating "active rest", focusing on rotational "movements you use in real life", centering on balance, and "paying attention to the cycles and the rhythms of energy."

A March 2005 article highlighting Shmock's work with Mariners catcher Dan Wilson was picked up from The Seattle Times by a wire service and republished by a newspaper in Passaic County, N.J. In a November Times article republished in Bradenton, Florida; Kansas City, Kansas; Myrtle Beach, South Carolina; and Columbia, South Carolina; Shmock urged readers to "progressively warm up" and reminded them, "There's no rule that says once you start you can't stop, and if you do, you've failed."

In April 2005, "uber-trainer" Shmock appeared on "Science Guy" Bill Nye's TV show Eyes of Nye to explain sports science.

Peter Shmock's work with his health club, ZUM, didn't stop him from continuing his other fitness programs. In 2006 he was still associated with the Elite Edge off-season program for skiers, and he taught a free bicycle workout class at Seattle REI with Ken Williams.

"'Less about performance and more about vitality,'" Shmock continued to add services at ZUM, and by 2007 the Seattle health club hired Colleen Casey as massage director. In 2008, Casey told The New York Times she was averaging 40 sports massages a month, up from 30 in 2007. By 2010, ZUM offered chiropractic, naturopathy, acupuncture, and a weight-loss program.

Having outgrown the Belltown space it fought so hard to keep in 2004, ZUM moved to The Vance Corporation's Tower Building on Seventh Avenue in January 2010. ZUM (now branded as ZŪM Fitness) occupies the ground and second floors of the 17-floor building. The health club kept the sand pit and monkey bars, added a climbing wall and floating staircase, and swapped the old building's "all-white quiet room" for a new "sage green serenity room." Founder Peter Shmock said, "'We've created a comfortable space that people want to come to.'"

Asked about his "personal philosophy of movement" in 2010, Shmock replied, "I want people to pay attention to their bodies, to observe their cycles of energy so they don't push too hard."
