= Greg Fredericks =

South African politician and sports administrator

Personal details
- Born: Gregory Abraham Fredericks; 1953 or 1954 (age 72–73)
- Citizenship: South Africa
- Party: African National Congress
- Education: University of South Africa; University of Manchester

Gregory Abraham Fredericks (born 1953 or 1954) is a South African sports administrator, civil servant, and politician. He represented the African National Congress in the National Assembly during the first democratic Parliament and was later the chief executive officer of the Gauteng Cricket Board from 2013 to 2019.

== Early life and education ==
Born in 1953 or 1954 in the Eastern Cape, Fredericks qualified as a teacher at Dower Training College and also studied at the University of South Africa. He completed his master's degree in education at the University of Manchester in 1992.

== Post-apartheid career ==
In the 1994 general election, Fredericks was elected to an ANC seat in the National Assembly, though he did not complete the full legislative term in his seat.

He later worked as a chief director in the Department of Education and Department of Sport and Recreation; in the latter capacity, he was appointed in 2002 to Sport Minister Ngconde Balfour's inter-ministerial committee on transformation in cricket. He was also involved in planning for the 2010 FIFA World Cup.

In October 2013, Fredericks succeeded Cassim Docrat as chief executive officer of the Gauteng Cricket Board, owner of the Lions. He held that position until October 2019, when he was succeeded by Jono Leaf-Wright.
