= Patrice Donnelly =

American hurdler and actor (born 1950)

Personal information
- Nickname: Pat Donnelly
- Nationality: American
- Born: April 30, 1950 (age 76) San Diego, California, United States

Sport
- Sport: Track and field
- Events: 100 metre hurdles, pentathlon

Patrice Michelle "Pat" Donnelly (born April 30, 1950) is an American retired track and field athlete and actress, known primarily for hurdling.

== Background ==
Donnelly was born in San Diego, California. She attended Grossmont College. She was a high school physical education teacher at St. Paul High School in Santa Fe Springs, CA.

In 1971, she was Miss La Mesa. After the 1976 Summer Olympics she married shot putter Peter Shmock. After divorcing Shmock, she married sprinter Mark Lutz, ex-spouse of distance runner Francie Larrieu.

== Career in hurdling ==
Once the fourth-ranked hurdler in the world, Donnelly set the college record for the women's 100 meter hurdles at 13.5 seconds in 1970.

She was on the 1975 All-America team for the 100 meter hurdles. At the 1975 Pan American Games she placed fourth.

Donnelly attended the 1976 Summer Olympics as a 100-meter hurdler for the United States, but was eliminated in the heats, missing the semi-final by only 0.01 sec.

== Career in film ==
Donnelly's film debut was in the 1982 film Personal Best, wherein she played Olympic pentathlete Tory Skinner. She also served as a technical advisor on the film. She also went on to play Danielle, the stern assistant coach in the 1986 movie American Anthem.

She helped Billy Crudup train for Without Limits (1998), a film about Steve Prefontaine's life.
