= Jane Frederick =

American heptathlete (born 1952)

Personal information
- Full name: Jane Wardell Frederick
- Born: April 7, 1952 (age 74) Oakland, California, U.S.
- Height: 1.74 m (5 ft 9 in)
- Weight: 73 kg (161 lb)
Medal record
Women's athletics
Representing the United States
World Championships
Bronze medal – third place	1987 Rome	Heptathlon
Universiade
Gold medal – first place	1975 Rome	Pentathlon
Silver medal – second place	1977 Sofia	Pentathlon

Jane Wardell Frederick (born April 7, 1952) is a former heptathlete from the United States who twice held the world record.

== Early life ==
A native of Oakland, California, Frederick attended Miramonte High School, then the University of Colorado (graduating in 1973 with a degree in Italian) and then the University of California for a master's degree in Italian Language and Literature.

== Athletics Career ==
She set two world records in the women's heptathlon:

- 6166 points on April 23–24, 1981, at the Mt. SAC Relays in Walnut, California.
- 6308 points on May 24–25, 1981 in Gotzis, Austria.

Note 1: The scores above use the scoring tables in use at the time; the points in the 1984 tables are 6104 and 6291 respectively.

Note 2: Frederick's score of 6104 points is the first world record recognized by World Athletics.

Frederick captured the bronze medal at the 1987 World Championships in Athletics, finishing behind teammate Jackie Joyner-Kersee.

Note: she also competed at the 1983 World Championships in the heptathlon not starting the final event.

Frederick competed in the AIAW for the Colorado Buffaloes track and field team, winning the pentathlon at the 1973 AIAW Outdoor Track and Field Championships.

Frederick was nine times national champion at the pentathlon/heptathlon: 1972–3, 1975–6, 1979, 1981, 1983, 1985–6.

In addition, Frederick was national outdoor champion in the 100 meter hurdles in 1975 and 1976 and indoor in the 60 yards hurdles in 1977.

Note: her time in 1977 is credited as an indoor world best time of 7.3 s.

=== Olympics ===
In 1972, Frederick was third at the Olympic Trials in the pentathlon (first American) and qualified for her first Olympics, eventually finishing 21st.

In 1976, Frederick won the Olympic Trials in the pentathlon and subsequently finished 7th at the Olympics.

In 1980, Frederick withdrew from the Olympic Trials in the pentathlon after the third event with an injury.

In 1984, Frederick was again injured for the Olympic Trials (for the heptathlon) and failed to record a height in the High Jump.

=== World University Games ===
Frederick competed for the United States at the World University Games in the pentathlon coming first in 1975, second in 1977 and fifth in 1973.

== Later Life ==
After college, Frederick became an athletics coach, first at the University of Texas and later at University of California, Santa Barbara.

In 1978, Frederick came second in the 1978 women's edition of the television program Superstars.

== Accolades and Awards ==
In 2007, Frederick was inducted into the United States Track and Field Hall of Fame.

In 2018, Frederick was inducted into the Miramonte High School Hall of Fame.

In 2022, Frederick was inducted into the Colorado University Athletic Hall of Fame.

== Rankings ==
Frederick was ranked among the best in the US and the world in the Heptathlon from 1975 to 1988, according to the votes of the experts of Track and Field News.

Heptathlon
Year	World rank	US rank
1975	4th	1st
1976	8th	1st
1977	7th	1st
1978	2nd	1st
1979	5th	1st
1980	-	-
1981	4th	1st
1982	5th	1st
1983	9th	1st
1984	5th	1st
1985	1st	1st
1986	-	3rd
1987	3rd	2nd
1988	-	4th

Note 1: Rankings started for the year 1975.

Note 2: The event changed for women from the Pentathlon to the Heptathlon in 1981.

== Book ==
- Emert, Phyllis Raybin, Jane Frederick, Pentathlon Champion Harvey House (1981) ISBN 978-0-8178-0017-8 (Juvenile audience)

Records
Preceded by None	Women's Heptathlon World Record Holder; April 24, 1981 — May 5, 1981	Succeeded by Nadezhda Vinogradova
