= Tommy Haynes =

American triple jumper

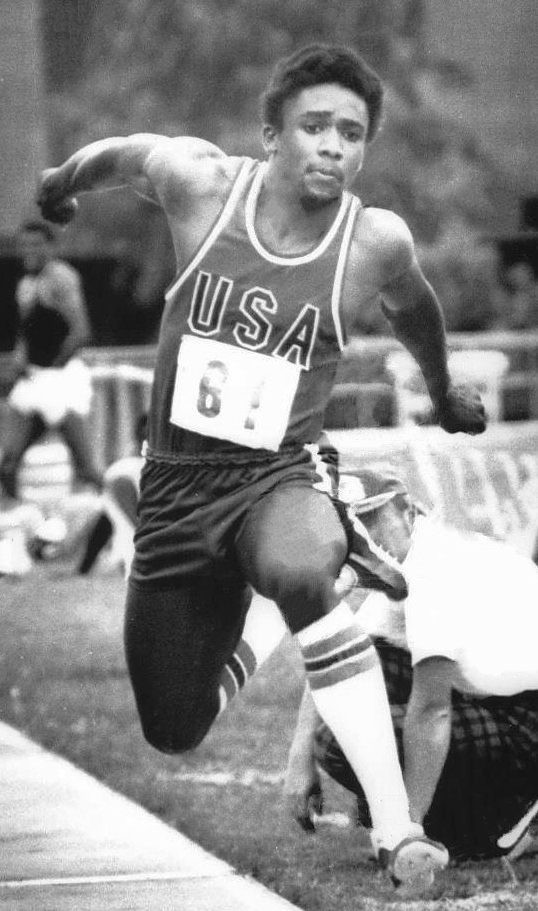
- Haynes in 1975

Personal information
- Born: July 14, 1952 (age 74) Nashville, Tennessee, U.S.
- Height: 177 cm (5 ft 10 in)
- Weight: 75 kg (165 lb)

Sport
- Sport: Athletics
- Events: Triple jump, long jump
- Club: U.S. Army

Achievements and titles
- Personal bests: TJ – 17.20 m (1975); LJ – 8.14 m (1974)
Medal record
Representing the United States
Pan American Games
| Silver medal – second place | 1975 Mexico City | Triple jump |

Thomas Zarlef Haynes (born July 14, 1952) is a retired American athlete, who mostly competed in the triple jump. He won a silver medal at the 1975 Pan American Games and placed fifth at the 1976 Olympics.

Competing for the Middle Tennessee Blue Raiders track and field program, Haynes won the 1974 triple jump at the NCAA Division I Indoor Track and Field Championships with a mark of 16.63 meters.

Domestically Haynes won the AAU triple jump championships outdoors in 1976 and indoors in 1975–77. In the long jump he won the AAU indoors title in 1977. Haynes was a career military officer, and after retiring from competitions became head track coach at the United States Military Academy.
