= Lynne Winbigler =

American discus thrower (born 1953)

Personal information
- Nationality: American
- Born: March 21, 1953 (age 73) Weiser, Idaho, United States

Sport
- Sport: Athletics
- Event: Discus throw

Margrethe Lynne Winbigler (married Anderson; born March 21, 1953) is an American athlete. She competed in the women's discus throw at the 1976 Summer Olympics.

Winbigler represented the Oregon Ducks track and field team in AIAW competition. She finished 3rd in the discus throw at the 1975 AIAW Outdoor Track and Field Championships.
