= Deby LaPlante =

American hurdler (born 1953)

Personal information
- Full name: Deborah C. Smith
- Born: Deborah C. Lansky; April 3, 1953 (age 73) Trenton, Michigan, U.S.
Medal record
Women's athletics
Representing the United States
Pan American Games
Gold medal – first place	1979 San Juan	100 m hurdles
Silver medal – second place	1975 Mexico City	100 m hurdles

Deborah C. "Deby" LaPlante (née Lansky, in second marriage Smith, also Sweezey ; born April 3, 1953) is an American retired female track and field athlete. She competed in the hurdles event. She twice won a medal at the Pan American Games during her career.

LaPlante was national outdoor champion in the 100 meter hurdles in 1978 and 1979 and indoor in the 60 yards hurdles in 1976 and 1978 (she was also second and the leading American in 1975).

LaPlante set her personal best in winning women's 100m hurdles title on June 16, 1979, clocking 12.86s in Walnut, California. This at the time set a new national record.

In 1977, LaPlante won gold in the 100m hurdles at the Pacific Conference Games.

Later in 1979 on the 25 August, LaPlante was fourth in the 100m hurdles event at the IAAF Athletics World Cup representing the United States.

LaPlante is credited with a world best times for the 60y hurdles of 7.97s and 7.53s in 1978.

LaPlante also competed for the United States in an annual competition against the Soviet Union. In this she won four bronze medals in the 100m hurdles in 1973, 1975, 1976 and 1978.

== Olympics ==
In 1972, LaPlante as Deby Lansky, was fourth in her qualifying heat at the Olympic Trials in the 100m hurdles.

In 1976, LaPlante was second in the Olympic Trials in the 100m hurdles and subsequently finished 6th in her semi-final at the Olympics.

In 1980, LaPlante fell at the 9th hurdle of the final of the 100m hurdles at the Olympic Trials not finishing the race and so not making the team.

In 1984, LapLante, then known as Deby Smith, reached the semi-finals of the Olympic Trials so not making the team.

== Personal life ==
Born as Deby Lansky, Lansky married Fred LaPlante after meeting him at Eastern Michigan University, although they later divorced.

In 1977, both Deby and Fred LaPlante worked at Columbia University, she as secretary, he as a coach at the University and also his wife's personal coach.

Later they moved to San Diego State University from 1979-83, where Fred was coach of track and field.

== Awards and Accolades ==
In 1992, LaPlante as Deby Sweezey (La PLante) was voted to the San Diego State University Hall of Fame.

LaPlante has also been inaugurated into the Michigan Track and Field Hall of Fame.

== Masters Athletics ==
Deby LaPlante Sweezey later competed in Masters Track and Field winning the 1995 World Masters Championship (W40) in the hurdles. 1993 Deby held the Masters W40 World Record in the 80 meter hurdles.

== Rankings ==
LaPlante was ranked among the best in the US and the world in the 100 m hurdles from 1976 to 1984, according to the votes of the experts of Track and Field News.

100 m Hurdles
Year	World rank	US rank
1976	-	2nd
1977	-	2nd
1978	-	1st
1979	8th	1st
1980	-	2nd
1981	-	-
1982	-	-
1983	-	-
1984	-	8th
