= Brenda Morehead =

American sprinter

Personal information
- Born: October 5, 1957 (age 68) Monroe, Louisiana, United States

Sport
- Sport: Sprinting
- Event: 100 metres

Brenda Morehead (born October 5, 1957) is an American sprinter.

Morehead ran for Toledo Scott High School; where she participated in the first girls high school meet, winning four events and leading her team to victory. She competed in the women's 100 metres at the 1976 Summer Olympics. Morehead qualified for the 1980 U.S. Olympic team but was unable to compete due to the 1980 Summer Olympics boycott. She did however receive one of 461 Congressional Gold Medals created especially for the spurned athletes.
