= Sherry Calvert =

American javelin thrower (born 1951)

Personal information
- Born: June 6, 1951 (age 75) Los Angeles, California, United States

Sport
- Sport: Track and field
Medal record
Representing United States
Pan American Games
Gold medal – first place	1975 Mexico City	Javelin throw
Silver medal – second place	1971 Cali	Javelin throw

Sherry Lynn Calvert (born June 6, 1951, in Los Angeles, California) is a retired female javelin thrower from the United States, who represented her native country twice at the Summer Olympics: 1972 and 1976. She set her personal best (63.38 metres) in 1978.

Calvert won the javelin at the 1970 DGWS Outdoor Track and Field Championships representing the USC Trojans track and field team.

== International competitions ==
Year	Competition	Venue	Position	Notes
1971	Pan American Games	Cali, Colombia	2nd	51.52 m
1972	Olympic Games	Munich, West Germany	15th	51.38 m
1975	Pan American Games	Mexico City, Mexico	1st	54.70 m
1976	Olympic Games	Montreal, Canada	13th	53.08 m
