= James Butts (triple jumper) =

American triple jumper (born 1950)

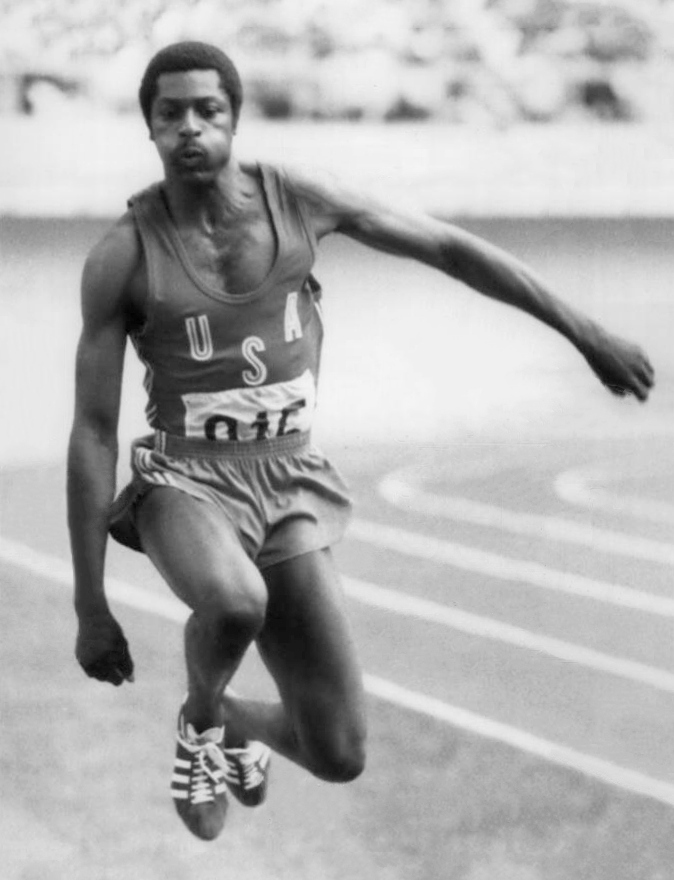
- Butts at the 1976 Olympics

Personal information
- Full name: James Aaron Butts
- Born: May 9, 1950 (age 76) South Los Angeles, California, U.S.
- Height: 188 cm (6 ft 2 in)
- Weight: 82 kg (181 lb)

Sport
- Sport: Athletics
- Event: Triple jump
- Club: Tobias Striders

Achievements and titles
- Personal best: 17.24 m (1978)
Medal record
Men's athletics
Representing the United States
Olympic Games
Silver medal – second place	1976 Montreal	Triple jump
Pan American Games
Bronze medal – third place	1979 San Juan	Triple jump

James Aaron Butts (born May 9, 1950) is a retired American triple jumper. He won a silver medal at the 1976 Olympics and a bronze at the 1979 Pan American Games. He was inducted into the UCLA Athletics Hall of Fame in 2014.

Butts won the 1976 U.S. Olympic Trials with a wind-aided 17.29 m, just short of the existing world record at the time. He narrowly missed making the team in 1972 and again in 1980, finishing in fourth place each time (the last time by a mere 1 cm).

Butts won the 1972 NCAA Men's Outdoor Track and Field Championships while competing for the University of California at Los Angeles. While training for the Olympics, he worked two jobs including as a janitor, to support his mother and sister. He had to train at 5 am as it was the only time that fit his schedule.
