= Al Feuerbach =

American track and field athlete

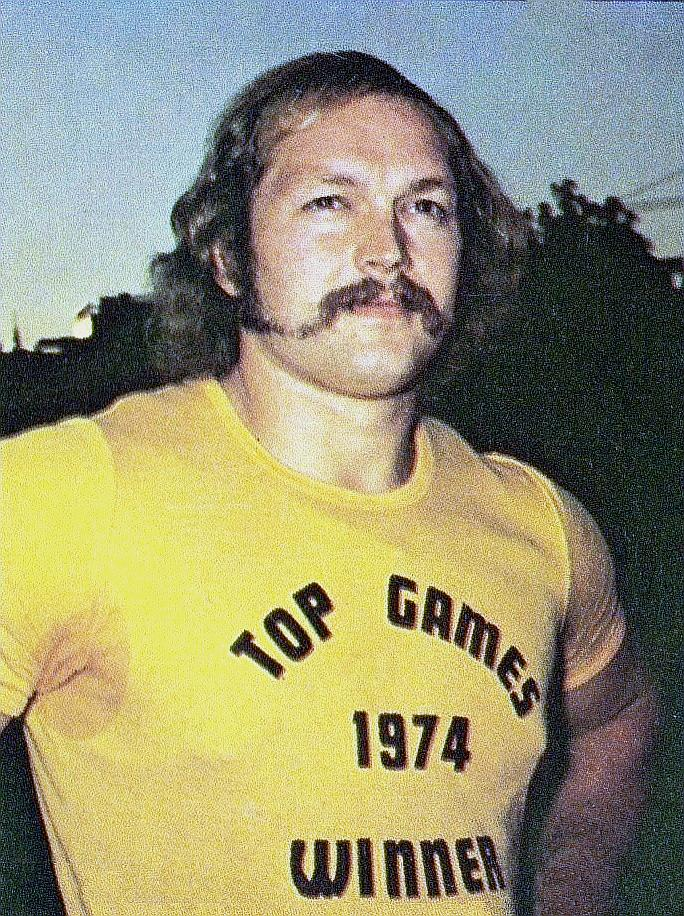
- Feuerbach in 1974

Personal information
- Born: Allan Dean Feuerbach; January 14, 1948 (age 78) Preston, Iowa, U.S.
- Height: 6 ft 1 in (185 cm)
- Weight: 240 lb (109 kg)

Sport
- Sport: Athletics
- Events: Shot put, discus throw
- Club: Pacific Coast Club, Long Beach

Achievements and titles
- Personal bests: SP – 21.82 m (1973); DT – 54.30 m (1970)
Medal record
Men's athletics
Representing the United States
Pan American Games
Gold medal – first place	1971 Cali	Shot put

Allan "Al" Dean Feuerbach (born January 14, 1948) is a former American track and field athlete. He competed in the shot put at the 1972 and 1976 Olympics and finished in fifth and fourth place, respectively. He missed the 1980 Games due to the boycott by the United States. He did however receive one of 461 Congressional Gold Medals created especially for the athletes.

On May 5, 1973, he broke Randy Matson's seven-year-old world record in the shot put by throwing 21.82 meters (71' 7") at the San Jose Invitational at San Jose State College. Just weeks later, competing in a different sport, olympic-style weight lifting, he finished first in the heavyweight division at the U.S. weightlifting championships. Feuerbach currently works as a freelance audio technologist.

He was a four time American champion in the shot put, plus he added three indoor championships and won the British AAA Championships title in the shot put event at the 1974 AAA Championships.

In 2016, he was elected into the National Track and Field Hall of Fame.

He later became a sound engineer, working with CNBC.

Records
Preceded by (United States) Randy Matson	Men's shot put world record holder May 5, 1973 – February 21, 1976	Succeeded by (United States) Terry Albritton
