= Association of Road Racing Statisticians =

Statistical society

- Established: 2003; 22 years ago
- Founder: Ken Young
- Type: Non-profit organization
- Website: arrs.run

The Association of Road Racing Statisticians is an independent, non-profit organization that collects, analyzes, and publishes statistics regarding road running races. The primary purpose of the ARRS is to maintain a valid list of world road records for standard race distances and to establish valid criteria for road record-keeping. The official publication of the ARRS is the Analytical Distance Runner. This newsletter contains recent race results and analysis and is distributed to subscribers via e-mail. The ARRS is the only organized group that maintains records on indoor marathons.

== History ==
Ken Young (November 9, 1941 – February 3, 2018) of Petrolia, California was a retired professor of atmospheric physics and former American record-holder in the indoor marathon who currently holds two of the top 10 marks in the event. Ted Haydon, a former track coach for the University of Chicago Track Club and the United States in the 1968 Olympic Games, reportedly staged an indoor marathon for Young so that he could make an attempt at a world record in the indoor marathon. Young also earned a PhD in geophysical sciences with a minor in statistics, and taught at the University of Arizona. Young was the founder and director of the National Running Data Center (NRDC), self-described as "an independent, non-profit organization devoted to the collection, analysis, publication and dissemination of long-distance running information." This group pioneered and developed road racing records in the United States.

After the United States Congress passed the Amateur Sports Act of 1978, The Athletics Congress (TAC), now known as USA Track & Field, replaced the Amateur Athletic Union as the national governing body for the sport of athletics. Although the records maintained by Young and the NRDC were initially "unofficial", The Athletics Congress recognized them as its official records at their annual meeting in late 1979.

In 1986, the official record-keeping for TAC was assumed by TACStats, later known as the Road Information Center.

== See also ==
- Association of Track and Field Statisticians
