= Robert Hersh =

American lawyer (1940–2023)

Robert Hersh (February 12, 1940 – January 18, 2023) was an American lawyer. He was also the Senior Vice President for the International Association of Athletics Federations (IAAF), the world governing body for the Athletics, collection of sports known in the United States as including track and field, cross country, racewalking and road running. He was a board member of USA Track & Field (USATF), the national governing body for the sport.

Hersh held numerous high ranking positions with both organizations that placed him at the forefront of the sport. He started with the IAAF on the Technical Committee and as Chairman of the Competition Working Group in 1984. In 1999 he was elevated to the Council and in 2011 was elected Senior Vice President over more recognized retired athletes Sebastian Coe and Sergey Bubka, the two favorites to succeed IAAF President Lamine Diack at the next election in 2015.

With USATF, he was a board member since before the organization took on its current name, joining The Athletics Congress board in 1980. He formerly served as USATF's General Counsel, and he was formerly the chairman of the USATF Rules committee and the Track and Field Records sub-committee. He was also a member of the Association of Track and Field Statisticians.

With his deep knowledge of the sport, Hersh was the English language stadium announcer at many high-profile meets including the 1984 Summer Olympics through the 1996 Summer Olympics and also the 2004 and 2008 Summer Olympics, the IAAF World Championships in Athletics from 1991 to 2007, the IAAF World Cup in 1994, 1998 and 2006, the IAAF World Indoor Championships in Athletics in 1987, 1999 and 2008, and the IAAF World Junior Championships in Athletics in 1994 and 1998. He was the announcer for the 1988 Olympic Trials when Florence Griffith Joyner set the world record.

Hersh was a graduate of Columbia University, where he was manager of the track and field team and Harvard Law School.

On October 4, 2018, USA Track & Field announced that Hersh was elected into the National Track and Field Hall of Fame. Robert Hersh died on January 18, 2023. He was 82 years old. Next month would have been his 83rd birthday.

== USATF controversy ==
Hersh's name became the center of controversy in 2014 when the delegates to the USATF National Convention voted overwhelmingly (392 to 70) to retain Hersh as the American representative to the IAAF Council, only to have the Board of Directors reverse that decision in their meeting as the delegates were on their way home, voting 11-1 to select USATF President Stephanie Hightower to replace Hersh. Athlete Lauren Fleshman said Hightower should step aside, while David Torrence said "It doesn't make sense." Torrence later switched his affiliation to running for Peru before his untimely death in 2017.
