= Millrose Games =

Annual indoor athletics meet

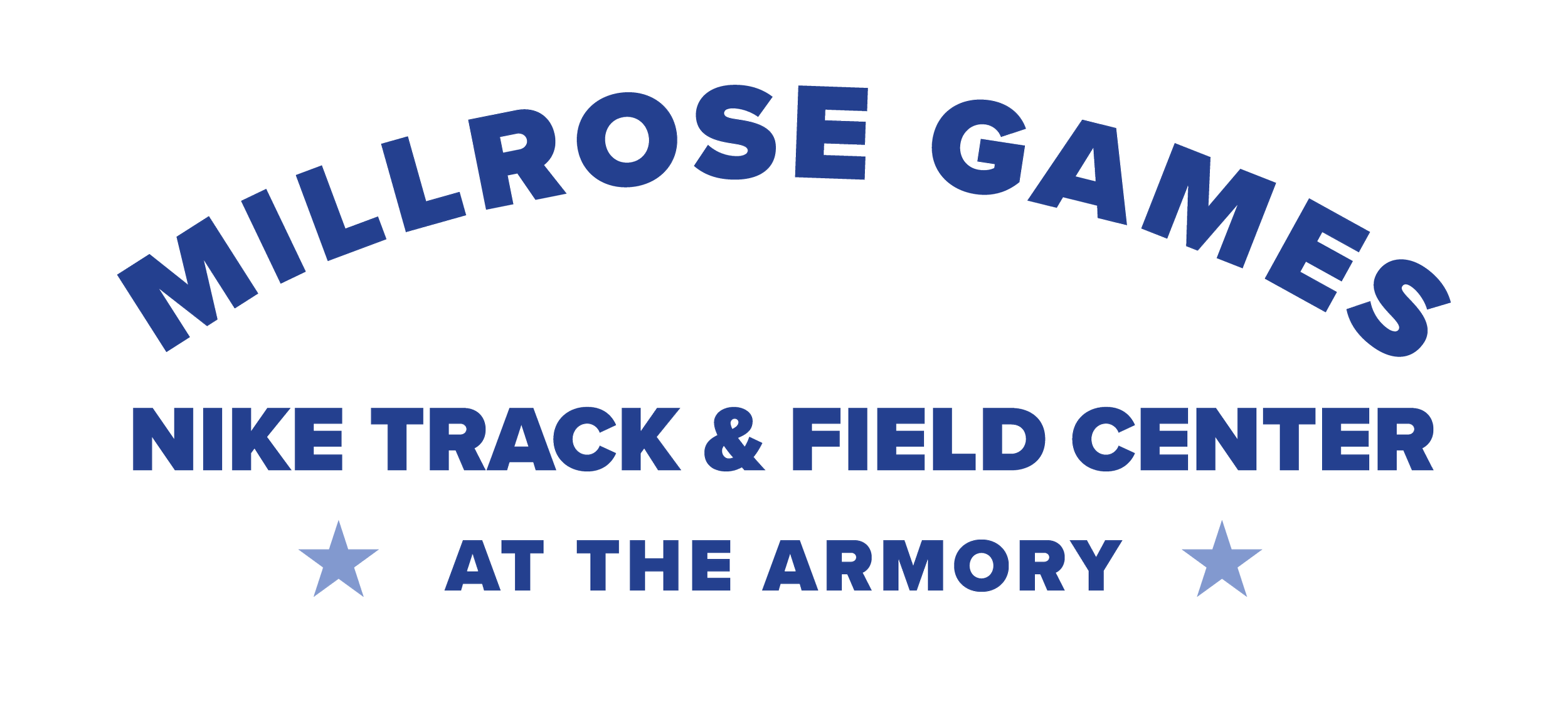
- Date: February
- Location: Fort Washington Avenue Armory, New York City, United States
- Event type: Indoor track and field
- Established: 1908; 118 years ago
- Organizer: Ray Flynn
- Website: https://millrosegames.org/
- 2026 Millrose Games

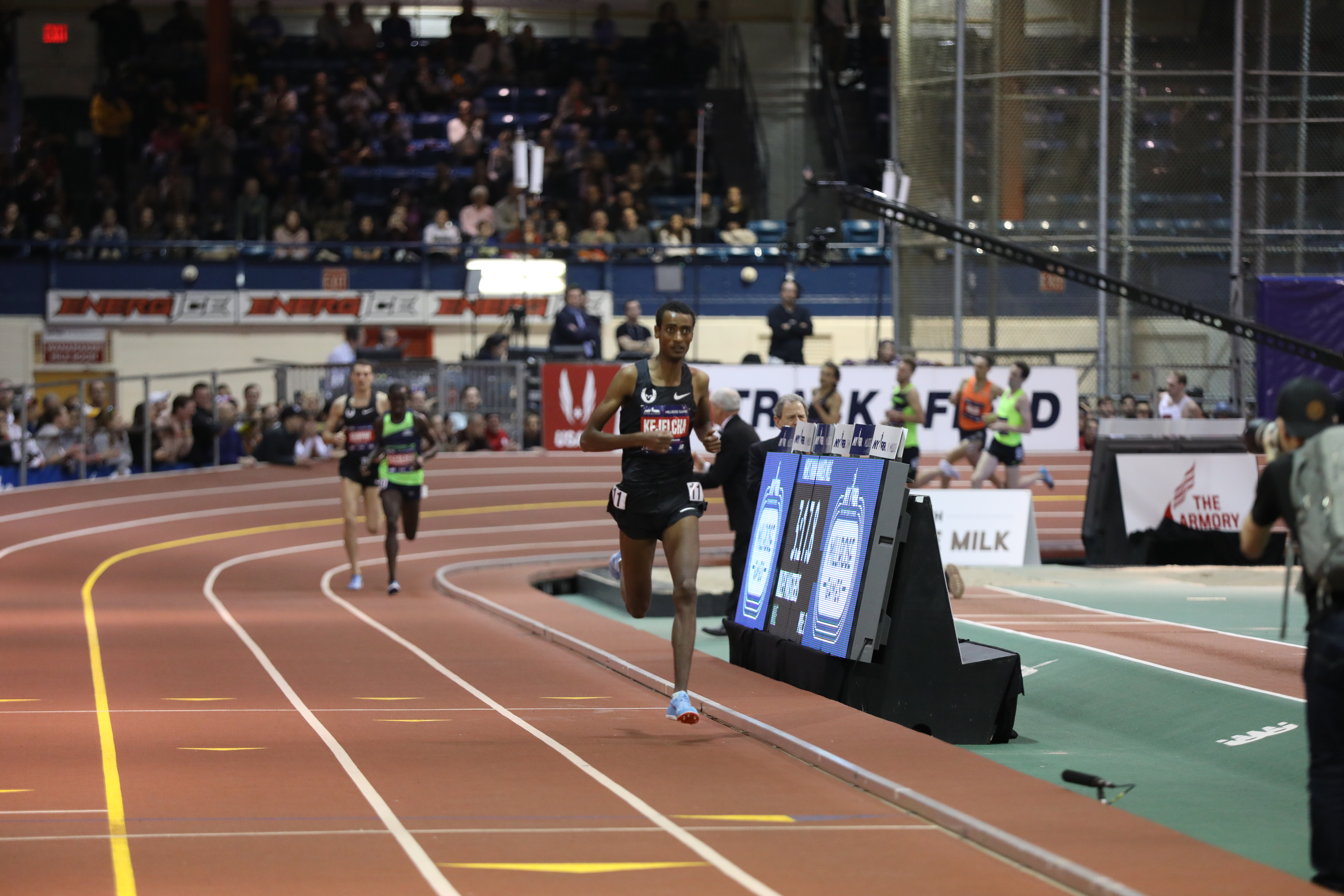
Yomif Kejelcha leading the Wanamaker Mile at the 2019 Millrose Games

The Millrose Games are an annual indoor athletics (track & field) meet held each February in New York City. Among the world's most prestigious indoor track meets, the games currently take place at the Fort Washington Avenue Armory in Washington Heights, having done so since 2012. They were previously held at Madison Square Garden from 1914 to 2011.

The games were started when employees of the New York City branch of Wanamaker's department store formed the Millrose Track Club to hold a meet.

Today, the Millrose Games feature elite competitions for athletes at all levels, including youth, club, masters, high school, collegiate, and professional levels.

The featured event is the Wanamaker Mile.

== History ==
2008 Millrose Games

The Millrose Games began in 1908 at a local armory the same year when its parent, the Millrose Athletic Association, was formed as a recreational club by the employees of the John Wanamaker Department Store. "Millrose" was the name of the country home of Rodman Wanamaker in Cheltenham, Pennsylvania.

In 1914, after overflowing the armory the year before, the Millrose Games moved to Madison Square Garden, and until 2011 was the oldest continuous sporting event held there. For 10 years beginning in 1916, the Wanamaker 1 ½ Mile race was a highlight of the meet. Run for the last time in 1925, the final edition was won by Paavo Nurmi, the nine-time Olympic gold medalist from Finland. In 1926, the distance was shortened, and the Wanamaker Mile was born. It has often been run at 10 p.m., a carryover from the days beginning in the 1930s when noted sports announcer Ted Husing would broadcast the race live on his 10 p.m. radio show.

The Wanamaker Mile has been won by over 44 different men, including Glenn Cunningham, Kip Keino, Tony Waldrop, Filbert Bayi, Steve Scott, Noureddine Morceli, Bernard Lagat, Marcus O'Sullivan, Ron Delany, and Eamonn Coghlan. Coghlan was known as the “Chairman of the Boards” for his dominance on the old wooden Millrose track and won the mile seven times, a feat surpassed only by Bernard Lagat, who won his eighth Wanamaker Mile in 2010.

Some highlights in Millrose history include Ray Conger's 1929 upset win over Nurmi in the Wanamaker Mile; pole vaulter Cornelius Warmerdam becoming the first person to vault 15 feet (4.6 m) indoors, in 1942; John Thomas hitting the first 7-foot (2.1 m) high jump, in 1959; Mary Decker’s run to a 1500-meter World Indoor Record to encouragement from the crowd, in 1980; John Uelses becoming the first person to pole vault the height of 16 feet; Carl Lewis in 1984 breaking the World Indoor Record with a jump of 28 feet (8.5 m), 10.25 inches, a mark that still stands; Eamonn Coghlan notching his then record seventh Wanamaker Mile in 1987; Bernard Lagat breaking Coghlan's record with his eighth Wanamaker Mile triumph in 2010, and Stacy Dragila setting a late-night pole vault world record in 2001.

For 70 of its first 96 years, the role of Millrose meet director was a father-son affair: Fred Schmertz directed the meet in 1934, passing on that position to his son Howard in 1975. In 2003, the title of Meet Director Emeritus was bestowed on the younger Schmertz.

In May 2011 Norbert Sanders, the President of the Millrose Games, announced that, starting January 2012, the games would be moved to the Armory in Washington Heights, at 168th Street, and that a new all-day Saturday schedule would replace the Friday evening format.

The Millrose Games, operated by The Armory Foundation, are also notable for their rigid anti-doping policies. In 2017, Millrose race director Ray Flynn told an ESPN reporter, "We have a mandate that we don't invite any athlete that has had any drug history in their past. We want to keep our meet free of any athlete that really has a violation."

The Millrose Games were first added to the World Athletics Indoor Tour Gold Standard in 2022.

At the 2023 Millrose Games, Dr. Anthony Fauci attended and was honored with The Armory's Presidents Award.

At the 2024 Millrose Games, the President of World Athletics, Sebastian Coe, was given The Armory's Presidents Award.

== Editions ==
Millrose Games Editions
Ed.	Name	Date	Ref.
1st	1908 47th Regiment Armory Games	7 Feb 1908	
2nd	1909 47th Regiment Armory Games	16 Jan 1909	
3rd	1910 Wanamaker Games	29 Jan 1910	
4th	1911 Millrose Games	22 Feb 1911	
5th	1912 Millrose Games	20 Jan 1912	
6th	1913 Millrose Games	18 Jan 1913	
7th	1914 Millrose Games	28 Jan 1914	
8th	1915 Millrose Games	14 Jan 1915	
9th	1916 Millrose Games	26 Jan 1916	
10th	1917 Millrose Games	24 Jan 1917	
11th	1918 Millrose Games	23 Jan 1918	
12th	1919 Millrose Games	25 Feb 1919	
13th	1920 Millrose Games	10 Feb 1920	
14th	1921 Millrose Games	8 Feb 1921	
15th	1922 Millrose Games	1 Feb 1922	
16th	1923 Millrose Games	31 Jan 1923	
17th	1924 Millrose Games	30 Jan 1924	
18th	1925 Millrose Games	27 Jan 1925	
19th	1926 Millrose Games	4 Feb 1926	
20th	1927 Millrose Games	2 Feb 1927	
21st	1928 Millrose Games	2 Feb 1928	
22nd	1929 Millrose Games	9 Feb 1929	
23rd	1930 Millrose Games	8 Feb 1930	
24th	1931 Millrose Games	7 Feb 1931	
25th	1932 Millrose Games	6 Feb 1932	
26th	1933 Millrose Games	4 Feb 1933	
27th	1934 Millrose Games	3 Feb 1934	
28th	1935 Millrose Games	2 Feb 1935	
29th	1936 Millrose Games	1 Feb 1936	
30th	1937 Millrose Games	6 Feb 1937	
31st	1938 Millrose Games	5 Feb 1938	
32nd	1939 Millrose Games	4 Feb 1939	
33rd	1940 Millrose Games	3 Feb 1940	
34th	1941 Millrose Games	1 Feb 1941	
35th	1942 Millrose Games	7 Feb 1942	
36th	1943 Millrose Games	6 Feb 1943	
37th	1944 Millrose Games	5 Feb 1944	
38th	1945 Millrose Games	3 Feb 1945	
39th	1946 Millrose Games	2 Feb 1946	
40th	1947 Millrose Games	1 Feb 1947	
41st	1948 Millrose Games	31 Jan 1948	
42nd	1949 Millrose Games	29 Jan 1949	
43rd	1950 Millrose Games	28 Jan 1950	
44th	1951 Millrose Games	27 Jan 1951	
45th	1952 Millrose Games	26 Jan 1952	
46th	1953 Millrose Games	29 Jan 1953	
47th	1954 Millrose Games	6 Feb 1954	
48th	1955 Millrose Games	5 Feb 1955	
49th	1956 Millrose Games	4 Feb 1956	
50th	1957 Millrose Games	9 Feb 1957	
51st	1958 Millrose Games	8 Feb 1958	
52nd	1959 Millrose Games	31 Jan 1959	
53rd	1960 Millrose Games	30 Jan 1960	
54th	1961 Millrose Games	3 Feb 1961	
55th	1962 Millrose Games	2 Feb 1962	
56th	1963 Millrose Games	1 Feb 1963	
57th	1964 Millrose Games	30 Jan 1964	
58th	1965 Millrose Games	28 Jan 1965	
59th	1966 Millrose Games	27 Jan 1966	
60th	1967 Millrose Games	26 Jan 1967	

Millrose Games Editions
Ed.	Name	Date	Ref.
61st	1968 Millrose Games	25 Jan 1968	
62nd	1969 Millrose Games	31 Jan 1969	
63rd	1970 Millrose Games	30 Jan 1970	
64th	1971 Millrose Games	29 Jan 1971	
65th	1972 Millrose Games	28 Jan 1972	
66th	1973 Millrose Games	26 Jan 1973	
67th	1974 Millrose Games	25 Jan 1974	
68th	1975 Millrose Games	31 Jan 1975	
69th	1976 Millrose Games	30 Jan 1976	
70th	1977 Millrose Games	28 Jan 1977	
71st	1978 Millrose Games	27 Jan 1978	
72nd	1979 Millrose Games	9 Feb 1979	
73rd	1980 Millrose Games	8 Feb 1980	
74th	1981 Millrose Games	6 Feb 1981	
75th	1982 Millrose Games	12 Feb 1982	
76th	1983 Millrose Games	28 Jan 1983	
77th	1984 Millrose Games	27 Jan 1984	
78th	1985 Millrose Games	25 Jan 1985	
79th	1986 Millrose Games	14 Feb 1986	
80th	1987 Millrose Games	30 Jan 1987	
81st	1988 Millrose Games	5 Feb 1988	
82nd	1989 Millrose Games	3 Feb 1989	
83rd	1990 Millrose Games	2 Feb 1990	
84th	1991 Millrose Games	1 Feb 1991	
85th	1992 Millrose Games	7 Feb 1992	
86th	1993 Millrose Games	5 Feb 1993	
87th	1994 Millrose Games	4 Feb 1994	
88th	1995 Millrose Games	3 Feb 1995	
89th	1996 Millrose Games	2 Feb 1996	
90th	1997 Millrose Games	7 Feb 1997	
91st	1998 Millrose Games	13 Feb 1998	
92nd	1999 Millrose Games	5 Feb 1999	
93rd	2000 Millrose Games	4 Feb 2000	
94th	2001 Millrose Games	2 Feb 2001	
95th	2002 Millrose Games	1 Feb 2002	
96th	2003 Millrose Games	7 Feb 2003	
97th	2004 Millrose Games	6 Feb 2004	
98th	2005 Millrose Games	4 Feb 2005	
99th	2006 Millrose Games	3 Feb 2006	
100th	2007 Millrose Games	2 Feb 2007	
101st	2008 Millrose Games	1 Feb 2008	
102nd	2009 Millrose Games	30 Jan 2009	
103rd	2010 Millrose Games	29 Jan 2010	
104th	2011 Millrose Games	28 Jan 2011	
105th	2012 Millrose Games	11 Feb 2012	
106th	2013 Millrose Games	16 Feb 2013	
107th	2014 Millrose Games	15 Feb 2014	
108th	2015 Millrose Games	14 Feb 2015	
109th	2016 Millrose Games	20 Feb 2016	
110th	2017 Millrose Games	11 Feb 2017	
111th	2018 Millrose Games	3 Feb 2018	
112th	2019 Millrose Games	9 Feb 2019	
113th	2020 Millrose Games	8 Feb 2020	
	2021 Millrose Games	Cancelled due to COVID-19	
114th	2022 Millrose Games	29 Jan 2022	
115th	2023 Millrose Games	11 Feb 2023	
116th	2024 Millrose Games	11 Feb 2024	
117th	2025 Millrose Games	8 Feb 2025	
118th	2026 Millrose Games	1 Feb 2026	

== Meeting directors ==
The Millrose Games has had ten meeting directors over its rich history.

Meet Director	Year(s) Active
Col. Clarence W. Smith	1911
Johnny Fleeson	1912
Andrew Christie	1913-1914
John J. McGowan	1915-1919
John G. Anderson	1920-1933
Fred Schmertz	1934-1974
Howard Schmertz	1975-2003
David Katz	2004-2008
Mark Wetmore	2009-2011
Ray Flynn	2012-present

== World records ==
Over the course of its history, five world records and three world bests have been set at the Millrose Games.

World records & bests set at the Millrose Games
Year	Event	Record	Athlete	Nationality
1984	Long jump	8.79 m	Carl Lewis	United States
1988	Mile walk	5:33.53 ^{[WB]}	Tim Lewis	United States
2018	300 m	35.45 ^{[WB]}	Shaunae Miller-Uibo	Bahamas
2018	4 × 800 m relay	8:05.89	Chrishuna Williams; Raevyn Rogers; Charlene Lipsey; Ajeé Wilson	United States
2024	60 m hurdles	7.67	Devynne Charlton	Bahamas
2024	Two miles	8:00.67 ^{[WB]}	Josh Kerr	Great Britain
2025	3000 m	7:22.91	Grant Fisher	United States
2025	Mile run	3:46.63	Yared Nuguse	United States

== Meeting records ==
=== Men ===
Men's meeting records of the Millrose Games
Event	Record	Athlete	Nationality	Date	Meet	Ref.
60 m	6.45	Maurice Greene	United States	4 February 2000		
300 m	32.35	Rai Benjamin	United States	8 February 2020		
400 m	45.35	Bralon Taplin	Grenada	20 February 2016		
500 m	1:00.06	Brycen Spratling	United States	14 February 2015		
600 y	1:07.53	Mark Everett	United States	7 February 1992		
600 m	1:14.04	Will Sumner	United States	8 February 2025	2025	
800 m	1:43.90	Josh Hoey	United States	8 February 2025	2025	
1000 m	2:17.63	Pierre-Ambroise Bosse	France	15 February 2014		
1500 m	3:31.74+	Yared Nuguse	United States	8 February 2025	2025	
Wanamaker Mile	3:46.63	Yared Nuguse	United States	8 February 2025	2025	
2000 m	4:54.74	Bernard Lagat	United States	15 February 2014		
3000 m	7:22.91	Grant Fisher	United States	8 February 2025	2025	
Two miles	8:00.67	Josh Kerr	Great Britain	11 February 2024	2024	
5000 m	13:07.15	Bernard Lagat	United States	11 February 2012		
60 m hurdles	7.38	Dylan Beard	United States	8 February 2025	2025	
High jump	2.34 m	Jimmy Howard	United States	26 January 1985		
High jump	2.34 m	Jimmy Howard	United States	14 February 1986		
Pole vault	5.87 m	Jeff Hartwig	United States	1 February 2002		
Long jump	8.79 m WR	Carl Lewis	United States	27 January 1984		
Shot put	22.58 m	Ryan Crouser	United States	11 February 2023	2023	
Weight throw	24.82 m	Lance Deal	United States	3 February 1993		
Mile walk	5:33.53	Tim Lewis	United States	5 February 1988		
4 × 200 m relay	1:26.24	Garden State TC: Rikkoi Brathwaite; Nadale Buntin; Jae'Len Means; Alex Kainer	British Virgin Islands; Saint Kitts and Nevis; United States; United States	11 February 2024	2024	
4 × 400 m relay	3:11.53	Atlantic Coast Club	United States	8 February 1988		
4 × 800 m relay	7:21.37	Penn State: Brannon Kidder; Casimir Loxsom; Za'Von Watkins; Ricky West	United States	16 February 2013		
Distance medley relay	9:42.79	NJ/NY TC: Travis Mahoney; Ben Scheetz; Nick Reid; Christian Thompson	United States	16 February 2013		

=== Women ===
Women's meeting records of the Millrose Games
Event	Record	Athlete	Nationality	Date	Meet	Ref.
60 m	6.99	Julien Alfred	Saint Lucia	11 February 2024	2024	
300 m	35.45 WB	Shaunae Miller-Uibo	Bahamas	3 February 2018		
400 m	50.89	Sanya Richards-Ross	United States	11 February 2012		
500 m	1:07.34	Courtney Okolo	United States	11 February 2017		
600 y	1:20.79	Lashinda Demus	United States	1 February 2008		
600 m	1:23.59	Alysia Montaño	United States	16 February 2013		
800 m	1:58.29	Ajeé Wilson	United States	8 February 2020		
800 m	1:58.27 X	Ajee' Wilson	United States	11 February 2017		
1000 m	2:35.50	Tsige Duguma	Ethiopia	1 February 2026		
1500 m	3:59.87+	Konstanze Klosterhalfen	Germany	8 February 2020		
Wanamaker Mile	4:16.41	Elinor Purrier	United States	11 February 2024	2024	
3000 m	8:25.05	Alicia Monson	United States	11 February 2023	2023	
Two miles	9:04.84	Laura Muir	Great Britain	11 February 2024	2024	
Two miles	9:04.39 (Note: later disqualified due to lane infringement)	Medina Eisa	Ethiopia	11 February 2024	2024	
5000 m	14:57.18	Betsy Saina	United States	20 February 2016		
60 m hurdles	7.67	Devynne Charlton	Bahamas	11 February 2024	2024	
High jump	2.00 m	Yaroslava Mahuchikh	Ukraine	11 February 2024	2024	
Pole vault	4.91 m	Sandi Morris	United States	8 February 2020		
Long jump	7.00 m	Jackie Joyner-Kersee	United States	7 February 1992		
Triple jump	12.40 m	Sydnee Burr	United States	11 February 2024	2024	
Shot put	20.03 m	Chase Ealey	United States	11 February 2023	2023	
Weight throw	24.19 m	Amber Campbell	United States	29 January 2010		
Mile walk	6:17.29	Rachel Seaman	Canada	15 February 2014		
4 × 200 m relay	1:36.30	Garden State TC: Taylor Anderson; Felicia Brown Edwards; Gabrielle Farquharson; Haisha Bisiolu	United States	11 February 2023	2023	
4 × 400 m relay	3:40.51	Atoms Track Club	United States	27 January 1984		
4 × 800 m relay	8:05.89 WR	Chrishuna Williams; Raevyn Rogers; Charlene Lipsey; Ajeé Wilson	United States	3 February 2018		
Distance medley relay	11:14.16	NJ/NY TC: Heather Wilson; Danielle Tauro; Kimmara McDonald; Caroline King	United States	16 February 2013		
