= Ove Karlsson =

Ove Karlsson may refer to:

- Ove Karlsson (footballer) (1915–1982), Swedish footballer
- Ove Karlsson (ice hockey) (born 1950), Swedish ice hockey player
- Ove Karlsson (sports journalist) (born 1944), Swedish journalist, member of the ISOH
