= Andy Bakjian =

Andy Bakjian (August 20, 1914 – February 26, 1986) was a Hall of Fame Track and Field official and author on the subject. An alternate on the ill-fated United States Olympic Wrestling team in 1940, Bakjian coached football, baseball and track at Jefferson High School in Los Angeles, California.

== Early life ==
Andy Bakjian was born August 20, 1914, in West Hoboken, New Jersey.

== Career ==
As head coach, he led Jefferson High School to the 1964 CIF California State Meet team title.

Working as an official, Bakjian worked at many of the top track and field meets in Southern California. He established himself as an outstanding official, which led to him becoming the Commissioner of Officials for the Southern California Association of the AAU in 1969. His service was recognized at the Mt. SAC Relays who established the Andy & Mary Bakjian Award For Outstanding USA Track & Field Competition Officials

In 1982 he authored the book Track Management published by Track and Field News, ISBN 0-911521-01-1.

He was chairman of the National Officials Committee. He was also the chairman of the panel that selected the officials who would work the 1984 Summer Olympic Games in Los Angeles. He also served as chief referee of running events at the Games, a position that among other events, had to settle the controversial collision between Mary Decker and Zola Budd.

== Death and legacy ==
After his death, Bakjian's wife Mary continued his legacy as both a leading official and the manager of track and field operations in Southern California until her retirement in 2009. Mary died on April 20, 2016.

USATF, now the successor to the AAU and later TAC, has named its award for outstanding officiating after Bakjian. He was elected to the National Track and Field Hall of Fame following his death in 1986.
