= Scott Davis (announcer) =

Scott Davis (September 21, 1943, in San Francisco, California-August 18, 2010 in Cerritos, California) was perhaps the top Track and Field announcer in the United States from the 1980s until his death. He was the primary public address voice at major meets including championship meets like the Olympic Trials, the USA Outdoor Track and Field Championships, the NCAA Championships and top level professional meets that encompass the currently named Visa Championship Series like the Prefontaine Classic, the Adidas Grand Prix and most notably at the Mt. SAC Relays, where he was also the meet director for a decade starting in 1997. He was also frequently the English language voice of many top level International meets. The last meet he announced was the 2010 World Junior Championships in Athletics in Moncton, Canada. His voice from that meet can be heard as the English announcer in this video on YouTube.

A top track statistician, he founded the Federation of American Statisticians of Track (FAST), publishing its annual summation of statistics called the "FAST Annual" which he frequently promoted and sold from the announcer's booth. He was the editor of USATF's media guide. He was also the secretary of the Association of Track and Field Statisticians, serving from 1994 until his death.

Davis had suffered from various forms of cancer for 13 years. He was posthumously elected into the Mt. SAC Relays Hall of Fame in 2011. In 2021 he was elected into the National Track and Field Hall of Fame.
