= Bob Kersee =

American track coach

Personal information
- Occupation: Track coach
- Employer: USA Track and Field
- Spouse: Jackie Joyner-Kersee

Bob Kersee is an American track and field coach. For the UCLA Bruins, he was an assistant coach (1980–1984), head coach (1984–1993), and volunteer coach (since 1993). Athletes he coached include the late Florence Griffith Joyner, Jackie Joyner-Kersee (whom he later married), Gail Devers, Allyson Felix, and Sydney McLaughlin-Levrone.

Kersee has been called a "drug coach" referring to allegations that his athletes took performance-enhancing drugs. Angela Bailey testified at a Canadian government inquiry that Kersee could not train drug-free athletes. Darrell Robinson gave a notarized statement that Kersee supplied him with anabolic steroids. The Athletics Congress has declined to investigate their allegations.

== Early life ==
Kersee was born in the Canal Zone, Panama. He was educated at San Pedro High School, and then attended Los Angeles Harbor College and California State University, Long Beach. He graduated from college in 1978 with a degree in physical education.

Initially intending to become an NFL coach, Kersee instead became a track and field coach at the suggestion of his sisters. His training group is known as Formula Kersee.

== Career ==
In 1980, Kersee moved to the University of California, Los Angeles (UCLA), where he was an assistant coach for four years whilst working towards a master's degree in exercise physiology. He then became the head coach in 1984, winning six conference championships during his tenure. He stepped down as head coach in 1993.

He established his reputation for training elite level athletes, and continued working for the UCLA Bruins as a volunteer coach alongside his personal coaching. Amongst the famous athletes he has coached are Florence Griffith Joyner, Gail Devers, Al Joyner, Allyson Felix, Greg Foster, Andre Phillips, Kerron Clement, Shawn Crawford, Athing Mu, Sydney McLaughlin-Levrone, and Jackie Joyner-Kersee, whom he later married.

He has been called a "mad scientist" of coaching, and is often criticized for not racing his athletes often.

== Performance-enhancing drugs allegations ==
In 1985, Canadian sprinter Angela Bailey was coached by Kersee at UCLA. Four years later, she testified at a Canadian government inquiry into performance-enhancing drugs about a conversation she had with Kersee: "I said that I've heard these rumors that he was a drug coach. The only reason I'm going to go down to the United States is if you can make me that promise that you can coach me without drugs. But if you can't, then I won't be there. And he basically said, 'Just believe in me, just trust me.'" Bailey had left UCLA after six months, because Kersee was unable to coach clean athletes: "He didn't know how to coach me because I was drug-free. And I didn't improve."

American sprinter Darrell Robinson was also coached by Kersee at UCLA. In 1989, he made notarized statements to the German magazine Stern about him and other athletes using performance-enhancing drugs and about coaches including Kersee supplying them. Robinson said that Kersee told him that he gave his athletes the anabolic steroids Anavar and Dianabol, and that Kersee supplied him with one hundred tablets in a bottle labelled Anavar. Initially, the president of The Athletics Congress (TAC) said that Robinson's statements would be reviewed, but later the TAC director said that they questioned Robinson's reliability as a source for receiving $50,000 from Stern and the matter was not investigated further.

In 2008, Kersee denied there was a crisis of performance-enhancing drugs in athletics: "One, two, three situations and it scars everybody and that's absolutely ridiculous. I tell my athletes we need positive performances and positive stories." And about drug tests he said: "As long as all the other athletes are tested as much as mine are I'm happy."

== Personal life ==
Kersee is a fan of the New York Yankees, the NFL, and NASCAR. Off the track, he enjoys furniture restoration. He married his former athlete Jackie Joyner-Kersee in 1986.

== Awards ==
Awards Kersee has won are:

- Pac-12 Conference
  - In 2016, Kersee took home the Pac-12 Women's Track & Field Coach of the Century honors, with his wife, Jackie Joyner-Kersee, earning the Pac-12 Women's Track & Field Athlete of the Century title.
- USA Track and Field
  - In 2005, Kersee was selected USA Track & Field Coach of the year.
  - In 2015, Kersee won again Coach of the Year.
  - In 2017, Kersee was elected to the United States Track & Field Cross Country Coaches Association (USTFCCCA) Hall of Fame.
  - In 2023, Kersee was awarded the USA Track & Field Legend Coach Award.
- World Athletics Awards
  - Coaching Achievement Award: 2021
