= National Track and Field Hall of Fame =

Museum in New York City

Coordinates: 40°50′31.7″N 73°56′28.5″W

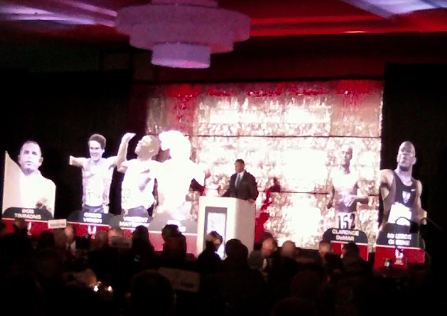
Award ceremony for the National Track and Field Hall of Fame at the Jesse Owens Award banquet in 2011.

The National Track and Field Hall of Fame is a museum operated by The Armory Foundation in conjunction with USA Track & Field. It is located within the Armory Foundation (the former Fort Washington Avenue Armory) at 216 Fort Washington Avenue, between 168th and 169th Streets, in Washington Heights, in the New York City borough of Manhattan. The stated goal of the Hall is to reflect upon, appreciate, and honor the past by saluting Americans who have made important contributions to the history of Track and Field. Inductees to the Hall of Fame include athletes, coaches, contributors, officials, event directors, journalists and administrators. USA Track & Field has been inducting members into the Hall since 1974. Currently there are 254 people enshrined.

== History ==
The National Track and Field Hall of Fame was founded in Charleston, West Virginia, in 1974. The museum moved to Indianapolis in 1985 when it came under the auspices of USA Track & Field, the national governing body for the sport of track and field in the United States. The Indianapolis museum closed in 1996 when the exhibits were moved for the 1996 Centennial Olympics in Atlanta. The exhibits were then displayed in Los Angeles before touring across the nation as a traveling museum until 2002 when The Armory building was chosen as its permanent location.

Exhibits include the original 1976 Nike Waffle Trainers and a singlet and shorts worn by Hall of Famer Steve Prefontaine.

== Nomination criteria ==
The nomination criteria differs for the type of inductee as follows:

=== Athlete ===
Only open class accomplishments are considered. In order to be considered, an athlete must have participated in an open competition at least three years prior to consideration, except when an athlete has reached forty years of age, and must fall into one or more of the following criteria:

- World record holder
- American record holder
- World champion
- Olympic champion;
- World or American leader in event(s) for three or more years;
- Winner of four or more USA national open championships; and/or
- Other outstanding accomplishments at a national open or international open level.

=== Coach ===
To be nominated, a coach must have been retired for at least one year from active full-time coaching, except where the nominated person has coached for thirty-five (35) years or more, and must fall into the following criteria:

- Having compiled an outstanding record of coaching champions at the level coached (e.g. national open, national collegiate, state high school, etc.); and
- Having compiled an extraordinary winning record or have achieved other outstanding accomplishments; and
- Having coached for at least twenty (20) years.

=== Contributor ===
In order to be nominated as a Contributor, the nominee must have served the Athletics community with special distinction and worked within the athletics community in its best interests in an outstanding manner for at least twenty (20) years. Contributors may also be nominated for having achieved other outstanding accomplishments.

=== Additional categories ===
Also under USATF is the Masters Hall of Fame, created in 1996 and the Officials Hall of Fame created in 2007. The membership of those two halls are selected by separate committees of those divisions of USATF for separate achievements in those divisions. As such, there is some duplication of names. Those members currently exist as a list of honored names, but have no physical representation at the hall in New York City.

== Selection process ==
Each February, the National Track & Field Board and Screening Committee begins to actively seek nominations which are due by May 1 each year. On May 15, all nominations (including those carry-over nominations from previous years which have not been under consideration for the maximum five (5) years) are compiled by the national staff of USA Track & Field. All nominations are then reviewed by the Hall of Fame Screening Committee which is charged with forwarding the best candidates eligible to the voters. The membership of the committee is confidential. The committee has full authority to make nominations to create the best ballot possible.

The Staff Coordinator for the Hall of Fame creates the ballot of ten (10) nominees (the number of nominees may be increased for equity in gender, discipline, and era of competition or service, but will never number more than twelve (12) nominees) and accompanying documentation (biographies, etc.) by June 30. The ballot is then reviewed by the President of the Hall of Fame and chair of the Screening Committee before being forwarded to the voters near the end of July. The voters include inducted Hall of Famers, the Hall of Fame committee members and selected members of the Track and Field Writers of America.

Each voter has one vote and any voter who fails to cast a ballot for two (2) consecutive years may be removed from the list of eligible voters until they request and cast a ballot in a subsequent year. All ballots must be returned to the accounting firm responsible for tabulation of votes by August 29. In the beginning of September, Accounting firm, chair of the Screening Committee, and President of the Board review the ballots and declare the inductees who are announced later in the month.

== Museum ==
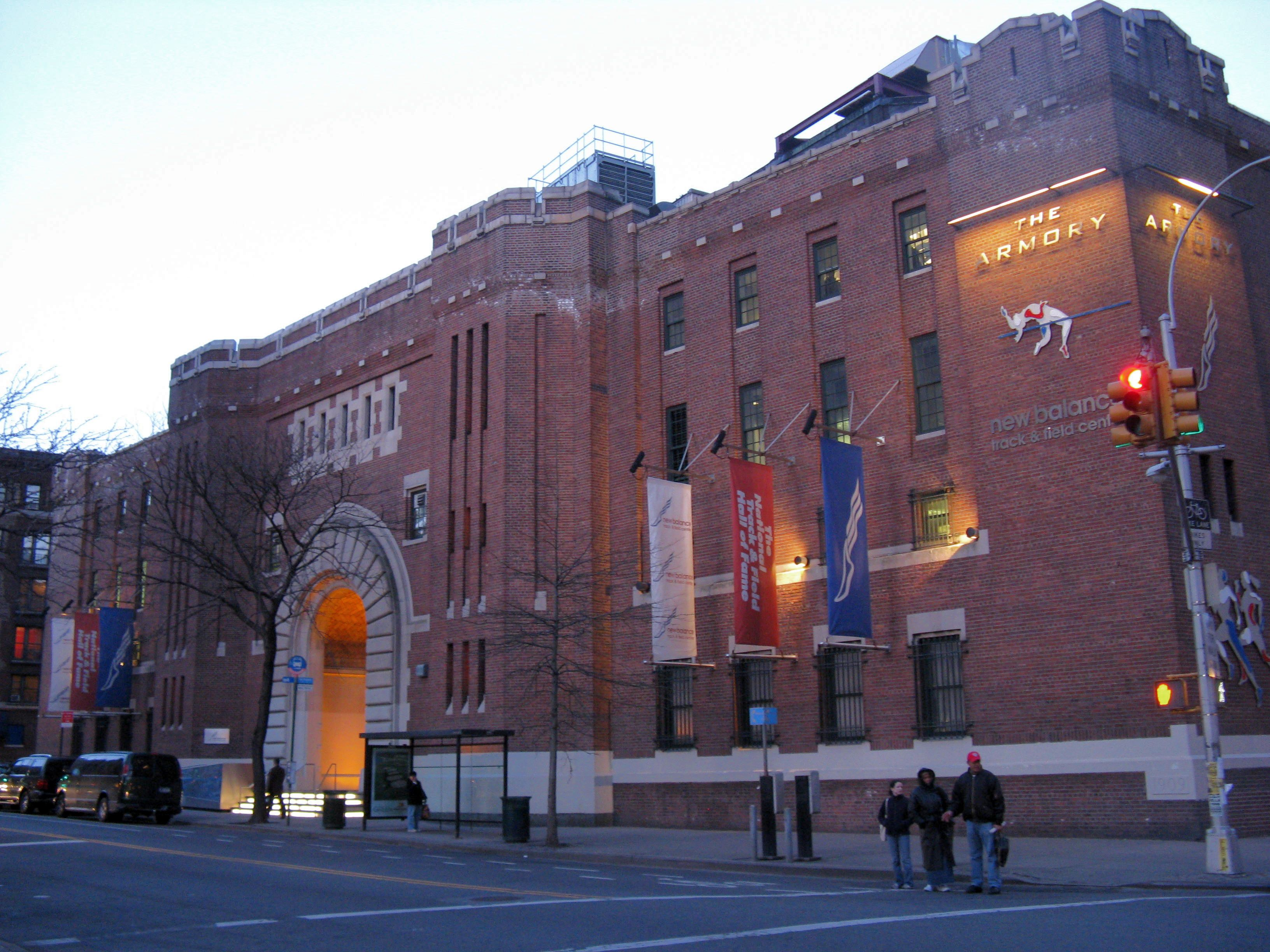
Exterior of The Armory Building where the National Track & Field Hall of Fame is located.

Located at The Armory Foundation, at 216 Fort Washington Avenue in Washington Heights, New York the museum is split into three levels. The first level contains main lobby, the Hall of Fame Theater (featuring a film simply called "Welcome to The Hall of Fame", produced by Peter Frankfurt) and the Hall of Fame History Gallery, where the Olympic Moment film produced by Bud Greenspan can be viewed. The second level holds the Hall of Fame Atrium, the Hall of Fame Champion Gallery and the Fred Lebow Marathon Hall. The third level holds the Hall of Fame Gallery featuring a 40-foot (12 m)-long etched glass wall with the names of all the inductees engraved upon it. Through the glass wall visitors can see the 65,000-square-foot (6,000 m^{2}) arena that is home to the largest indoor collegiate and high school invitational events in the world.

== Inductees ==
The following table lists all persons who have been inducted into the National Track and Field Hall of Fame.

Name	Induction Year	Category	Ref
Abbott, Cleve	1996	Coach	
Jesse Abramson	1981	Journalist	
Albritton, Dave	1980	Athlete	
Andersen, Roxanne	1991	Athlete	
Ashenfelter, Horace	1975	Athlete	
Ashford, Evelyn	1997	Athlete	
Austin, Charles	2012	Athlete	
Bakjian, Andy	1986	Official	
Banks, Willie	1999	Athlete	
Barney Ewell, Norwood	1986	Athlete	
Baskin, Weemie	1982	Coach	
Batten, Kim	2012	Athlete	
Bausch, James	1979	Athlete	
Beamon, Bob	1977	Athlete	
Beard, Percy	1981	Athlete	
Beatty, Jim	1990	Athlete	
Bell, Earl	2002	Athlete	
Bell, Greg	1988	Athlete	
Bell, Sam	1992	Coach	
Blozis, Al	2015	Athlete	
Boeckmann, Delores	1976	Athlete	
Borican, John	2000	Athlete	
Boston, Ralph	1974	Athlete	
Botts, Tom	1983	Coach	
Bowden, Don	2008	Athlete	
Bowerman, Bill	1981	Coach	
Bragg, Don	1996	Athlete	
Brisco, Valerie	1995	Athlete	
Brown, Doris	1990	Athlete	
Brown, Earlene	2005	Athlete	
Brundage, Avery	1974	Administrator	
Burke, Thomas 'Tom'	2014	Athlete	
Burleson, Dyrol	2010	Athlete	
Burrell, Leroy	2017	Athlete	
Bush, Jim	1987	Coach	
Calhoun, Lee	1974	Athlete	
Campbell, Milt	1989	Athlete	
Carlos, John	2003	Athlete	
Carnes, Jimmy	2008	Coach	
Carr, Bill	2008	Athlete	
Carr, Henry	1997	Athlete	
Cassell, Ollan	2006	Contributor	
Cawley, Rex	2006	Athlete	
Cheeseborough, Chandra	2000	Athlete	
Clark, Jearl Miles	2010	Athlete	
Clark, Ellery	1991	Athlete	
Clay, Bryan	2017	Athlete	
Coachman, Alice	1975	Athlete	
Cochran, Roy	2010	Athlete	
Conley, Mike	2004	Athlete	
Connolly, Harold	1984	Athlete	
Conway, Hollis	2015	Athlete	
Copeland, Lillian	1994	Athlete	
Corbitt, Theodore 'Ted'	2014	Contributor	
Courtney, Tom	1978	Athlete	
Craig, Ralph	2010	Athlete	
Cromwell, Dean	1974	Coach	
Cunningham, Glenn	1974	Athlete	
Curtis, William	1979	Contributor	
Davenport, Willie	1982	Athlete	
Davis, Glenn	1974	Athlete	
Davis, Harold	1974	Athlete	
Davis, Jack	2004	Athlete	
Davis, Otis	2004	Athlete	
Davis, Scott	2021	Contributor	
Deal, Lance	2014	Athlete	
Dellinger, Bill	2000	Athlete	
DeMar, Clarence	2011	Athlete	
Dennis, Evie	2004	Contributor	
Devers, Gail	2011	Athlete	
Didriksen, Mildred	1974	Athlete	
Diggs, Joetta Clark	2009	Athlete	
Dillard, Harrison	1974	Athlete	
Doherty, Ken	1976	Athlete	
Dragila, Stacy	2014	Athlete	
Drake, Elvin	2007	Coach	
Duffey, Arthur	2012	Athlete	
Dumas, Charles	1990	Athlete	
Dunaway, James	2010	Journalist	
Eastman, Ben	2006	Athlete	
Easton, Millard	1975	Coach	
Edelen, Buddy	2016	Athlete	
Elliot, James	1981	Coach	
Ellis, Larry	1999	Coach	
Evans, Lee	1983	Athlete	
Ewry, Ray	1974	Athlete	
Faggs, Mae	1976	Athlete	
Farmer-Patrick, Sandra	2019	Athlete	
Ferrell, Barbara	1988	Athlete	
Ferris, Dan	1974	Administrator	
Feuerbach, Al	2016	Athlete	
Flanagan, John	1975	Athlete	
Forman, Ken	2009	Coach	
Fosbury, Dick	1981	Athlete	
Foster, Greg	1998	Athlete	
Frederick, Jane	2007	Athlete	
Fuchs, Jim	2005	Athlete	
Giegengack, Bob	1978	Coach	
Gill, Harry	2015	Coach	
Godina, John	2013	Athlete	
Gordien, Fortune	1979	Athlete	
Gray, Johnny	2008	Athlete	
Greene, Charles	1992	Athlete	
Greene, Maurice	2011	Athlete	
Griffith, John	1979	Administrator	
Griffith Joyner, Florence	1995	Athlete	
Hahn, Archie	1983	Athlete	
Hall, Evelyne	1988	Athlete	
Hamilton, Brutus	1974	Athlete	
Hammond, Kathy	2018	Athlete	
Hardin, Glenn	1978	Athlete	
Harrison, Kenny	2013	Athlete	
Haydon, Ted	1975	Coach	
Hayes, Billy	1976	Coach	
Hayes, Bob	1976	Athlete	
Haylett, Ward	1979	Coach	
Held, Franklin	1987	Athlete	
Hersh, Bob	2018	Contributor	
Higgins, Ralph	1982	Coach	
Hillman, Harry	1976	Athlete	
Hines, Jim	1979	Athlete	
Houser, Bud	1979	Athlete	
Hubbard, DeHart	1979	Athlete	
Huntsman, Stan	2004	Coach	
Hurt, Edward	1975	Coach	
Hutsell, Wilbur	1975	Coach	
Jackson, Nell	1989	Athlete	
James, Larry	2003	Athlete	
Jenkins, Charles	1992	Athlete	
Jenner, Caitlyn (Note: Known as Bruce Jenner until her gender transition in 2015.)	1980	Athlete	
Jennings, Lynn	2006	Athlete	
Johnson, Allen	2015	Athlete	
Johnson, Cornelius	1994	Athlete	
Johnson, Michael	2004	Athlete	
Johnson, Rafer	1974	Athlete	
Jones, Hayes	1976	Athlete	
Jones, Thomas	1977	Coach	
Jordan, Payton	1982	Coach	
Joyner-Kersee, Jackie	2004	Athlete	
Kelley, John	1980	Athlete	
Kingdom, Roger	2005	Athlete	
Kiviat, Abel	1985	Athlete	
Kraenzlein, Alvin	1974	Athlete	
Laird, Ron	1986	Athlete	
Larrabee, Mike	2003	Athlete	
Larrieu, Francine	1998	Athlete	
Larsen, Bob	2013	Coach	
Lash, Don	1995	Athlete	
Laskau, Henry	1997	Athlete	
Lebow, Fred	1994	Event Director	
Lewis, Carl	2001	Athlete	
Lewis, Steve	2019	Athlete	
Lindgren, Gerry	2004	Athlete	
Liquori, Marty	1995	Athlete	
Littlefield, Clyde	1981	Coach	
Long, Dallas	1996	Athlete	
Long, Maxey	2021	Athlete	
Mann, Ralph	2015	Athlete	
Manning, Madeline	1984	Athlete	
Marsh, Henry	2001	Athlete	
Marsh, Michael	2021	Athlete	
Mathias, Bob	1974	Athlete	
Matson, Randy	1984	Athlete	
Matthews, Vincent	2011	Athlete	
McCluskey, Joe	1996	Athlete	
McDaniel, Mildred	1983	Athlete	
McDonald, Pat	2012	Athlete	
McDonnell, John	2005	Coach	
McGrath, Matt	2006	Athlete	
McGuire, Edith	1979	Athlete	
McMillan, Kathy	2021	Athlete	
Meadows, Earle	1996	Athlete	
Meredith, James	1982	Athlete	
Metcalfe, Ralph	1975	Athlete	
Milburn, Rod	1993	Athlete	
Mills, Billy	1976	Athlete	
Moakley, John F.	1988	Coach	
Montgomery, Eleanor	2013	Athlete	
Moore, Charles	1999	Athlete	
Moore, Tom	1988	Event Director	
Morris, Glenn	2007	Athlete	
Morrow, Bobby	1975	Athlete	
Mortensen, Jess	1992	Coach	
Moses, Edwin	1994	Athlete	
Murphy, Mike	1974	Coach	
Myers, Laurence	1974	Athlete	
Myricks, Larry	2001	Athlete	
Nehemiah, Renaldo	1997	Athlete	
Nelson, Albert	1991	Contributor	
Nelson, Cordner	1988	Contributor	
Nieder, Bill	2006	Athlete	
O'Brien, Dan	2006	Athlete	
O'Brien, William	1974	Athlete	
Oerter, Al	1974	Athlete	
Osborn, Harold	1974	Athlete	
Owens, Jesse	1974	Athlete	
Paddock, Charley	1976	Athlete	
Patton, Mel	1985	Athlete	
Peacock, Eulace	1987	Athlete	
Pennel, John	2004	Athlete	
Phillips, Andre	2009	Athlete	
Phillips, Dwight	2018	Athlete	
Powell, John	2019	Athlete	
Powell, Mike	2005	Athlete	
Prefontaine, Steve	1976	Athlete	
Price-Smith, Connie	2016	Athlete	
Prinstein, Meyer	2000	Athlete	
Ray, Joie	1976	Athlete	
Remigino, Lindy	2017	Athlete	
Reynolds, Butch	2016	Athlete	
Rice, Greg	1977	Athlete	
Richards, Bob	1975	Athlete	
Ritter, Louise	1995	Athlete	
Robinson, Arnie	2000	Athlete	
Robinson, Elizabeth	1977	Athlete	
Rodgers, Bill	1999	Athlete	
Rose, Ralph	1976	Athlete	
Rosen, Melvin	1995	Coach	
Rudolph, Wilma	1974	Athlete	
Ryun, Jim	1980	Athlete	
Ryan, Patrick 'Pat' or 'Paddy'	2014	Athlete	
Salazar, Alberto	2001	Athlete	
Samuelson, Joan	2004	Athlete	
Santee, Wes	2005	Athlete	
Schmertz, Fred	2012	Contributor	
Schmertz, Howard	2012	Contributor	
Schmidt, Kate	1994	Athlete	
Scholz, Jackson	1977	Athlete	
Schul, Bob	1991	Athlete	
Scott, Steve	2002	Athlete	
Seagren, Bob	1986	Athlete	
Seidler, Maren	2000	Athlete	
Sheppard, Mel	1976	Athlete	
Sheridan, Martin	1988	Athlete	
Shiley, Jean	1993	Athlete	
Shorter, Frank	1989	Athlete	
Silvester, Jay	1998	Athlete	
Sime, Dave	1981	Athlete	
Simpson, Robert	1974	Athlete	
Slaney, Mary	2003	Athlete	
Smith, Calvin	2007	Athlete	
Smith, Tommie	1978	Athlete	
Snyder, Larry	1978	Coach	
Squires, Bill	2017	Coach	
Stanfield, Andy	1977	Athlete	
Steers, Les	1974	Athlete	
Steele, Willie	2009	Athlete	
Stephens, Helen	1975	Athlete	
Stones, Dwight	1998	Athlete	
Sullivan, James	1977	Administrator	
Taylor, Frederick	2000	Athlete	
Temple, Ed	1989	Coach	
Templeton, Dink	1976	Coach	
Tewksbury, Walter	1996	Athlete	
Thomas, John	1985	Athlete	
Thompson, Fred	2019	Coach	
Thomson, Earl	1977	Athlete	
Thorpe, Jim	1975	Athlete	
Timmons, Bob	2011	Coach	
Tolan, Eddie	1982	Athlete	
Toomey, Bill	1975	Athlete	
Torrance, Jack	2015	Athlete	
Torrence, Gwen	2002	Athlete	
Towns, Forrest	1976	Athlete	
Trammell, Terrence	2021	Athlete	
Tyus, Wyomia	1980	Athlete	
Van Wolvelaere-Weirich, Patty	2017	Athlete	
Virgin, Craig	2011	Athlete	
Walker, LeRoy	1983	Coach	
Walsh, Stella	1975	Athlete	
Warmerdam, Cornelius	1974	Athlete	
Watson, Martha	1987	Athlete	
Wefers, Bernie	2008	Athlete	
White, Willye	1981	Athlete	
Whitfield, Mal	1974	Athlete	
Wilkins, Mac	1993	Athlete	
Williams, Archie	1992	Athlete	
Williams, Randy	2009	Athlete	
Williams, Steve	2013	Athlete	
Wilt, Fred	1981	Athlete	
Winter, Lloyd	1985	Coach	
Wohlhuter, Rick	1990	Athlete	
Wolcott, Fred	2005	Athlete	
Wolfe, Vern	1996	Coach	
Woodruff, John	1978	Athlete	
Woods, George	2007	Athlete	
Wottle, Dave	1982	Athlete	
Wright, Stan	1993	Coach	
Wykoff, Frank	1977	Athlete	
Yancey, Joe	1984	Coach	
Young, George	1981	Athlete	
Young, Kevin	2006	Athlete	
Young, Larry	2002	Athlete	
Zarnowski, Frank	2016	Contributor	
