= Florence Griffith Joyner =

American track and field hurdle athlete (1959–1998)

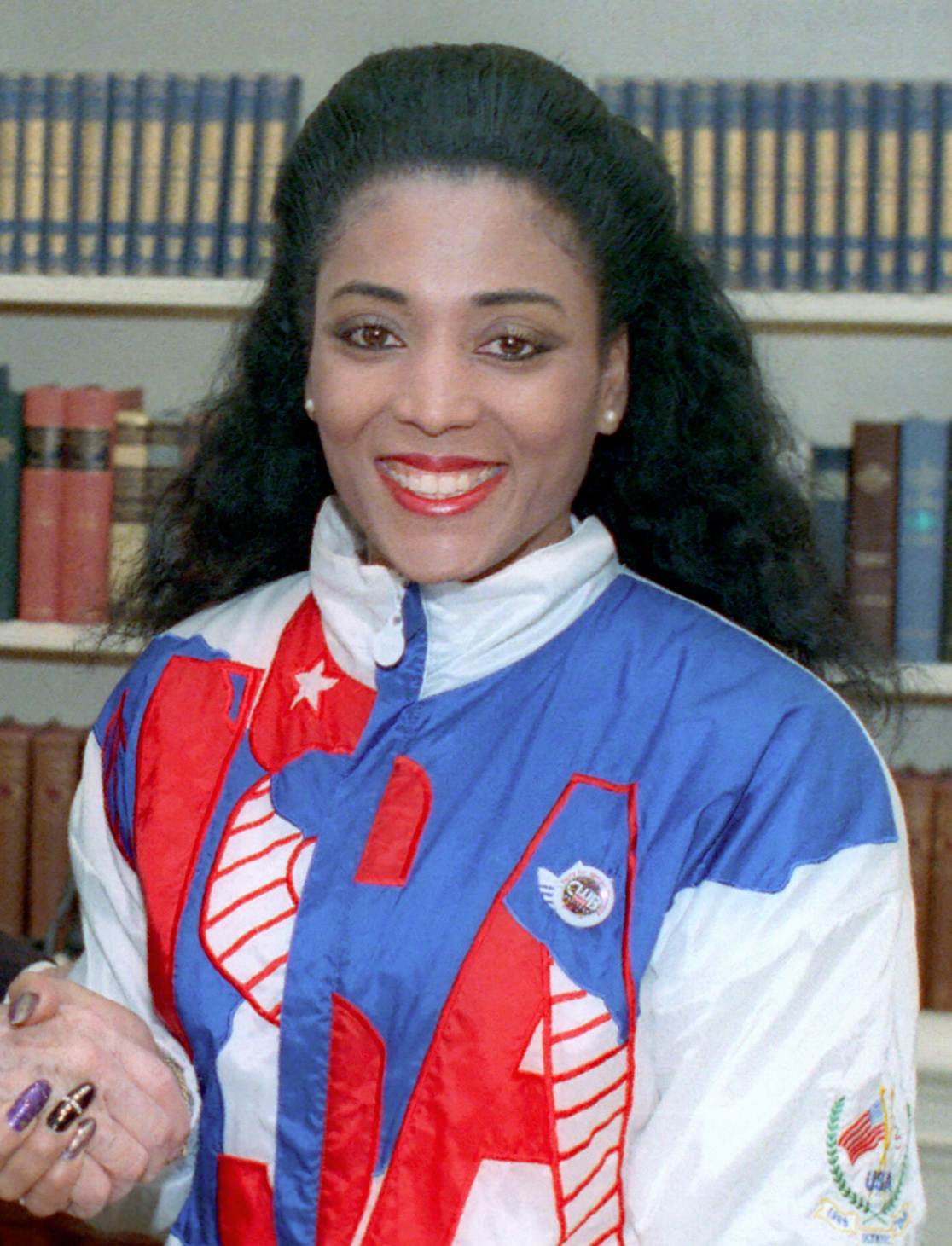
- Griffith Joyner in 1988

Co-chair of the President's Council on Physical Fitness and Sports
- In office 1993–1998 Serving with Tom McMillen
- President: Bill Clinton
- Preceded by: Arnold Schwarzenegger (as chairman)
- Succeeded by: Lee Haney (as chair)

Personal details
- Born: Florence Delorez Griffith; December 21, 1959 Los Angeles, California, U.S.
- Died: September 21, 1998 (aged 38) Mission Viejo, California, U.S.
- Resting place: El Toro Memorial Park, Lake Forest, California, U.S.
- Sports career
- Nickname: Flo-Jo
- National team: United States
- Height: 5 ft 7 in (170 cm)
- Weight: 126 lb (57 kg)
- Events: 100 meters, 200 meters
- Club: Tiger World Class Athletic Club; West Coast Athletic Club
- Retired: 1989

Sports achievements and titles
- Personal bests: 100 m: 10.49 WR (Note: It is widely believed that the anemometer was faulty for the race in which Griffith Joyner set this record. A 1995 report commissioned by the IAAF estimated the true wind speed was between +5.0 m/s and +7.0 m/s, rather than the ±0.0 m/s recorded. If this time, recorded in the quarter-final of the 1988 U.S. Olympic trials, were excluded, the world record (until the 10.54 recorded by Elaine Thompson-Herah on August 21, 2021) would have been 10.61 s, also by Griffith Joyner, recorded the next day at the same venue in the final.); 200 m: 21.34 WR; 400 m: 50.89; 4 × 100 m: 41.55; 4 × 400 m: 3:15.51 AR
Medal record
Women's athletics
Representing the United States
Olympic Games
Gold medal – first place	1988 Seoul	100 m
Gold medal – first place	1988 Seoul	200 m
Gold medal – first place	1988 Seoul	4 × 100 m
Silver medal – second place	1984 Los Angeles	200 m
Silver medal – second place	1988 Seoul	4 × 400 m
World Championships
Gold medal – first place	1987 Rome	4 × 100 m
Silver medal – second place	1987 Rome	200 m

Florence Delorez Griffith Joyner (née Griffith; December 21, 1959 – September 21, 1998), also known as Flo-Jo, was an American track and field athlete who set world records in the 100 m and 200 m in 1988. During the late 1980s, she became a popular figure due to both her record-setting athleticism and eclectic personal style.

Griffith Joyner was born and raised in California. She was athletic from a young age and began running at track meets as a child. While attending California State University, Northridge (CSUN), and the University of California, Los Angeles (UCLA), she continued to compete in track and field. While still in college, she qualified for the 100 m for the 1980 Olympics, but did not compete due to the U.S. boycott. She made her Olympic debut four years later, winning a silver medal in the 200 m at the 1984 Olympics in Los Angeles. At the 1988 U.S. Olympic trials, Griffith set a new world record in the 100 m. She won three gold medals at the 1988 Olympics.

In February 1989, Griffith Joyner abruptly retired from track and field. She remained a pop culture figure through endorsement deals, acting, and designing. In 1998, at age 38, she died in her sleep during an epileptic seizure caused by a birth defect. Griffith Joyner is buried at the El Toro Memorial Park in Lake Forest.

== Early life ==
Florence Delorez Griffith was born in Los Angeles, California, the seventh of eleven children born to Robert, an electrician, and Florence Griffith, a seamstress. The family lived in Littlerock, California, before Florence Griffith moved with her children to the Jordan Downs public housing complex located in the Watts section of Los Angeles.

When Griffith was in elementary school, she joined the Sugar Ray Robinson Organization, running in track meets on weekends. She won the Jesse Owens National Youth Games two years in a row, at the ages of 14 and 15. Griffith ran track at Jordan High School in Los Angeles.

Showing an early interest in fashion, Griffith persuaded the members of the track team to wear tights with their uniforms. As a high school senior in 1978, she finished sixth at the CIF California State Meet behind future teammates Alice Brown and Pam Marshall. By the time she graduated from Jordan High School in 1978, she had set high-school records in sprinting and long jump.

== Career ==
Griffith attended CSUN, and was on the track team coached by Bob Kersee. This team, which included Brown and Jeanette Bolden, won the national championship during Griffith's first year of college. Griffith had to drop out to support her family, taking a job as a bank teller. Kersee found financial aid for her and she returned to college in 1980, this time at UCLA where Kersee was working as a coach.

Brown, Bolden, and Griffith qualified for the 100-meter final at the trials for the 1980 Summer Olympics (with Brown winning and Griffith finishing last in the final). Griffith also ran the 200 meters, narrowly finishing fourth, a foot out of a qualifying position. However, the U.S. Government had already decided to boycott those Olympic Games mooting those results. In 1983, Griffith graduated from UCLA with her bachelor's degree in psychology.

=== Olympic runner ===
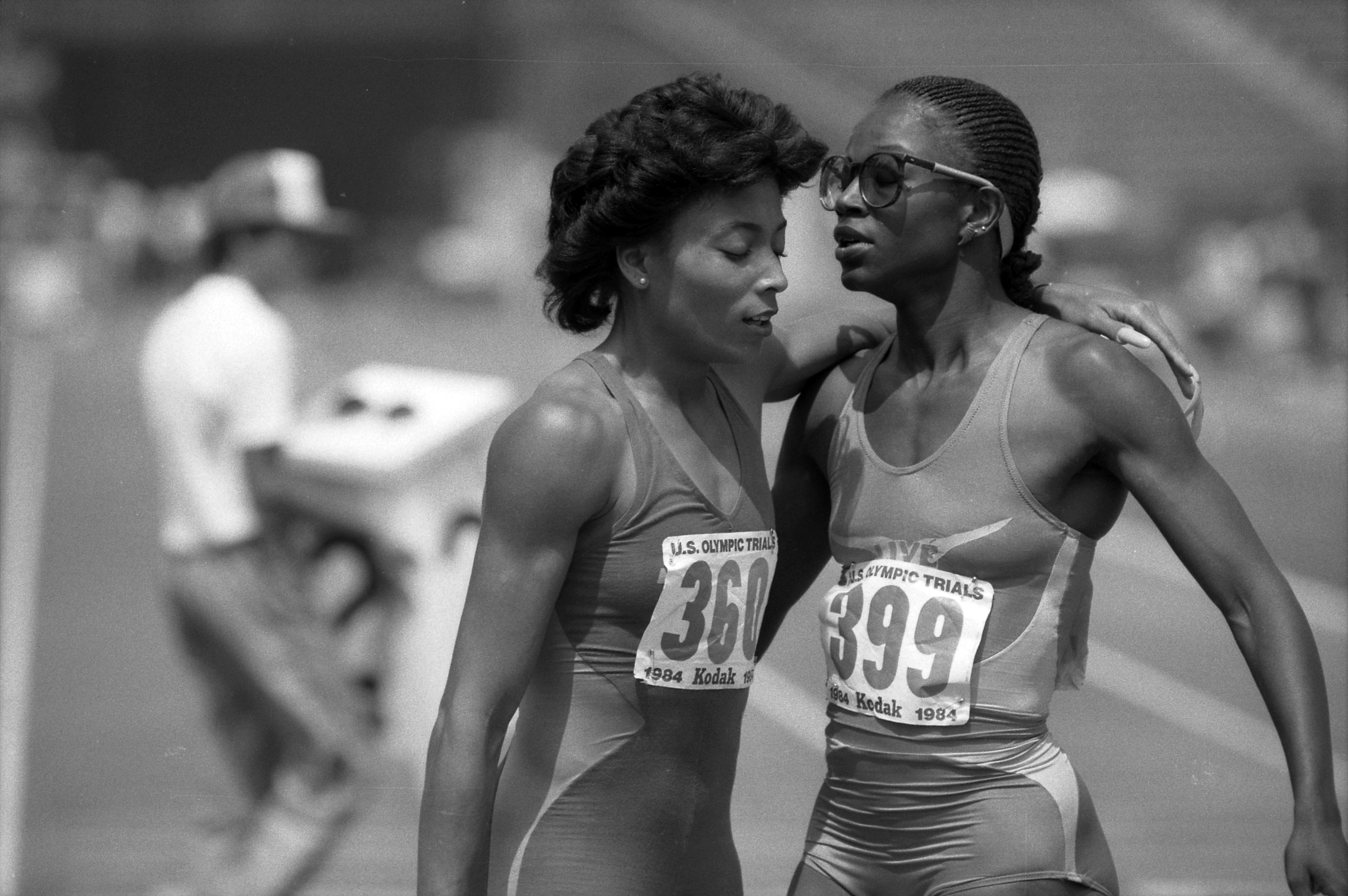
Florence Griffith Joyner (left) with Valerie Brisco-Hooks at the 1984 Olympic trials

Griffith finished fourth in the 200-meter sprint at the first World Championship in Athletics in 1983. In the next year, she qualified for the Olympics in the 200-meter distance with the second-fastest time at the United States Olympic trials, held in Los Angeles. Evelyn Ashford, another UCLA alumna and early favorite to medal, dropped out of the 200 meters due to injury. Griffith went on to win a silver medal in the 1984 Summer Olympics, coming in second behind teammate Valerie Brisco-Hooks.

After the 1984 Olympic Games, she spent less time running. Griffith continued to run part-time, winning the 100-meter IAAF Grand Prix Final with the time of 11.00 seconds. She did not compete at the 1985 U.S. National Championship. That same year, she returned to working at a bank and styled hair and nails in her spare time. She married Al Joyner, the Olympic triple jump champion of 1984, in 1987.

She returned to athletics in April 1987. Four months later, at the 1987 World Championships in Rome, Griffith Joyner finished second in the 200-meter sprint. Her success during the 1987 season resulted in being ranked second in Track and Field News' 1987 world rankings. The 200 meters remained a stronger event for her than the 100 meters, where she was ranked seventh in the United States.

Before the 1988 U.S. Olympic trials, Griffith Joyner continued to work with her coach and husband's brother-in-law, Kersee, two days a week, but with her new husband coaching her three days a week. She ran the 100 meters in 10.96 seconds at the 1987 Cologne Grand Prix Track and Field Meet, a personal best but the mark was not even in the top 40 of all time. She continued to improve, again setting a personal best of 10.89 in the 100 meters in San Diego on June 25, 1988, but remained shy of the American record holder Evelyn Ashford's three best times. A week before the trials she ran a tune-up race in 10.99 in Santa Monica.

In the first race of the quarterfinals of the U.S. Olympic trials, she stunned her colleagues when she sprinted 100 meters in 10.49 seconds, a new world record by a margin of 0.27s over the previous record held by Evelyn Ashford. Over the two-day trials, Griffith Joyner recorded the three fastest times for a woman at 100 meters: 10.49 in the quarter-final, 10.70 in the semifinal, and 10.61 in the final. At the same Olympic trials, she also set an American record at the 200-meter distance with a time of 21.77 seconds.

The 100-meter record was by far the largest improvement in the world record time since the advent of electronic timing, and still stands. This extraordinary result raised the possibility of a technical malfunction with the wind gauge which read at ±0.0 m/s—a reading at odds with the windy conditions on the day, with high wind speeds being recorded in all other sprints before and after this race as well as the parallel long jump runway at the time of the Griffith Joyner performance. All scientific studies commissioned by the IAAF and independent organizations have since found there was an illegal tailwind of between +5.0 m/s and +7.0 m/s at the time. The IAAF has not annulled the result, but since 1997 the International Athletics Annual of the Association of Track and Field Statisticians has listed it as "probably strongly wind assisted, but recognized as a world record." The fastest non-wind-assisted performance would then be Griffith Joyner's 10.61s in the final the next day. This mark was equaled by Elaine Thompson-Herah in the 2020 Olympic Final before being surpassed by Thompson-Herah at the post-Olympics Eugene Diamond League meeting in August 2021.

Following the Olympic trials, in late July 1988, Griffith Joyner left coach Kersee saying she wanted a coach able to provide more personal attention. Another contributing factor was her unhappiness with the lack of sponsorship and endorsement opportunities. In addition to being her coach, Kersee was Griffith Joyner's manager, as he required all the athletes he coached to use his management services too. Griffith Joyner's decision to sign with personal manager Gordon Baskin therefore necessitated the coaching change. She left UCLA for UC Irvine with her husband serving as full-time coach.

By then known to the world as "Flo-Jo", Griffith Joyner was the big favorite for the titles in the sprint events at the 1988 Summer Olympics. In the 100-meter final, she ran a 10.54, beating her nearest rival to the world record, Evelyn Ashford, by 0.30 seconds. In the 200-meter semifinal, she set the world record of 21.56 seconds and then broke this record by 0.22 seconds in winning the final with a time of 21.34 seconds.

At the same Olympics, Griffith Joyner also ran with the 4 × 100 m relay and the 4 × 400 m relay teams. Her team won the 4 × 100 m relay and finished second in the 4 × 400 m relay. This was her first internationally rated 4 × 400 m relay. She left the games having won four Olympic medals, three gold and one silver. At the time, her medal haul was the second most for female track and field athlete in history, behind only Fanny Blankers-Koen who won four gold medals in 1948.

In February 1989, four months after the Olympics, Griffith Joyner announced her retirement from racing. She cited her new business opportunities outside of sprinting. Griffith Joyner made her announcement days before a scheduled March 13, 1989 vote by The Athletic Congress (now known as USA Track & Field) that approved the introduction of mandatory random year-round drug testing. The month after announcing her retirement, she was selected as the winner of the James E. Sullivan Award of 1988 as the top amateur athlete in the United States. Griffith Joyner also won the 1988 World Athletics Award for women.

=== Comeback attempt and other activities ===
Griffith Joyner's success at the 1988 Olympics led to new opportunities. In the weeks following the Olympics, she earned millions of dollars from endorsement deals, primarily in Japan. She also signed a deal with toy maker LJN Toys for a Barbie-like doll in her likeness.

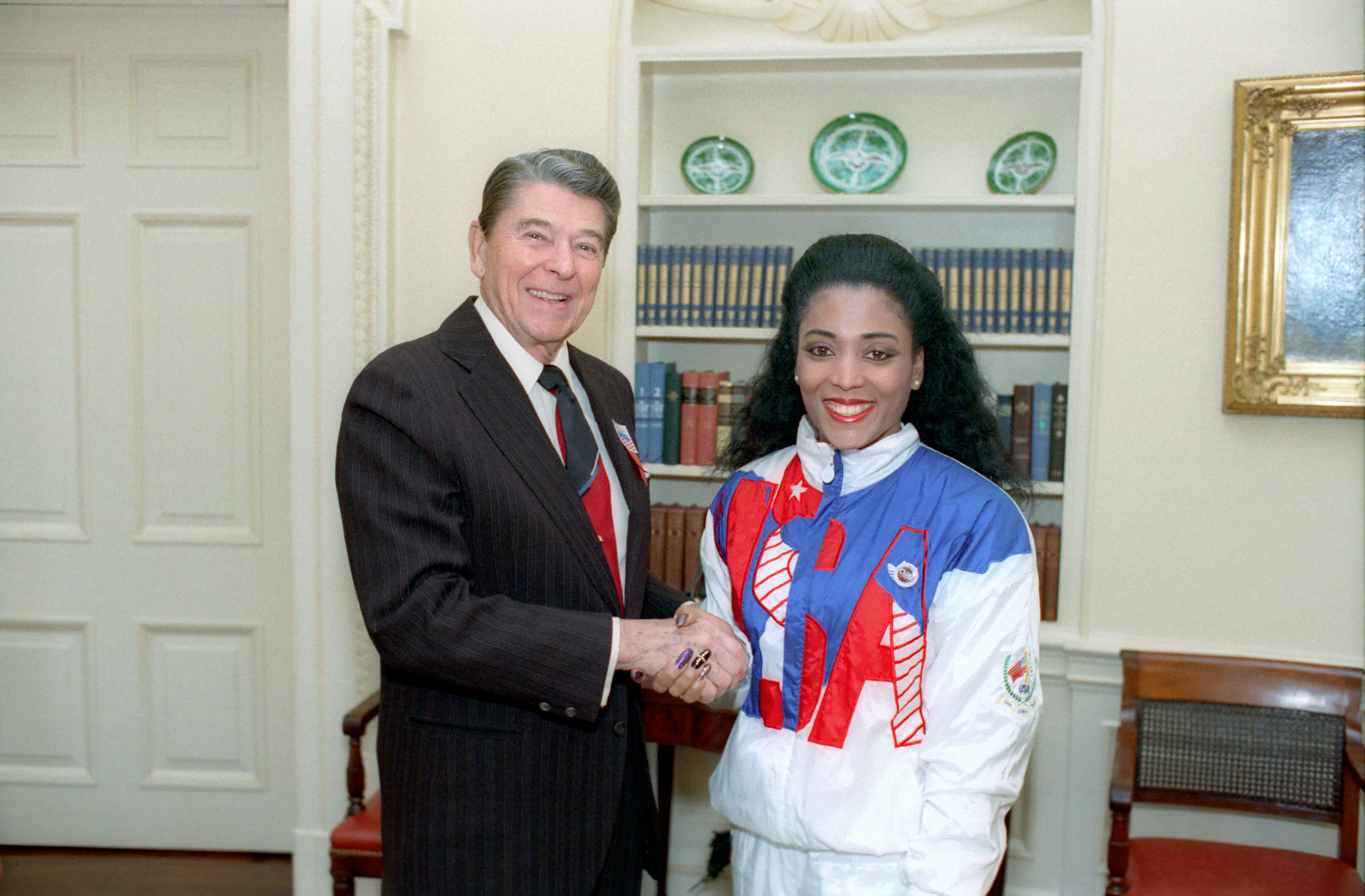
Griffith Joyner with President Ronald Reagan after the 1988 Olympics

In 1989, Griffith Joyner designed the basketball uniforms for the Indiana Pacers NBA team. She made a guest appearance as herself on a fourth-season episode of 227. In 1992, she appeared in the soap opera Santa Barbara as "Terry Holloway", a photographer similar to Annie Leibovitz. She served as co-chair of President's Council on Physical Fitness between 1993 and 1998.

In 1996, Griffith Joyner appeared on Charlie Rose and announced her comeback to competitive athletics, concentrating on the 400-meter run. Her reason was that she had already set world marks in both the 100 m and 200 m events, with the 400 m world record being her goal. She trained steadily leading up to the U.S. Olympic trials in June. However, tendinitis in her right leg ended her hopes of becoming a triple-world-record holder.

== Style ==
Beyond her running prowess, Griffith Joyner was known for her bold fashion choices. She appeared at the World Championships in 1987 in Rome wearing a hooded speed skating body suit. In April 1988, she started wearing a running suit with the right leg of the suit extending to the ankle and the left leg of the suit cut off, a style she called the "one-legger". The running suits had bold colors such as lime green and purple with white bikini bottoms and were embellished with lightning bolts.

Her nails also garnered attention for their length and designs. Her nails were four inches long with tiger stripes at the 1988 Olympic trials before switching to fuchsia. For the Olympic games themselves, she had six-inch nails painted red, white, blue, and gold. Although many sprinters avoided accessories which might slow them down, Griffith Joyner kept her hair long and wore jewelry while competing. She designed many of her outfits herself and preferred looks which were not conventional.

== Allegations of performance-enhancing drug use ==
After her record-shattering performances at the 1988 U.S. Olympic trials, Griffith Joyner became an object of suspicion when she arrived at the 1988 Olympic Games in Seoul. Athletes, including Joaquim Cruz and Ben Johnson, expressed disbelief over Griffith Joyner's dramatic improvement over a short period of time. Before the 1988 track and field season, her best time in the 100-meter sprint was 10.96 seconds (set in 1987). In 1988, she improved that by 0.47 seconds. Her best time before 1988 in the 200 meters was 21.96 seconds (also set in 1987). In 1988, she improved that time by 0.62 seconds to 21.34 seconds. Griffith Joyner's "increased musculature" in 1988 also led to questions about whether she had used performance-enhancing drugs. Griffith Joyner attributed the change in her physique to new health programs. Al Joyner replaced Bob Kersee as her coach, and he changed her training program to include more lower-body-strength training exercises such as squats and lunges.

In a 1989 story for which he was purportedly paid $25,000, Darrell Robinson, a former teammate of Griffith Joyner, claimed that he sold her 10 mL of growth hormone for $2,000 in 1988. He said Joyner told him that "if you want to make $1 million, you've got to invest some thousands." Robinson claimed to have received steroids from coach Bob Kersee. In 1990, Carl Lewis alleged in his autobiography that Griffith Joyner had used drugs.

Griffith Joyner denied that she had ever used performance-enhancing drugs. Neither Robinson nor Lewis provided evidence for their allegations; in addition, Robinson was shunned by the athletics community, leading to the premature end of his career. Griffith Joyner was repeatedly tested during competition and passed every test.

In late February 1989, four months after the closing ceremony of the 1988 Olympics and just days before the scheduled March 13, 1989 vote by The Athletic Congress (now known as USA Track & Field) that approved the introduction of mandatory random year-round drug testing, Griffith Joyner retired from competitive track and field.

After Griffith Joyner's death in 1998, Prince Alexandre de Merode, who held the controversial position as chairman of the International Olympic Committee's medical commission, claimed that Griffith Joyner was singled out for extra, rigorous drug testing during the 1988 Olympic Games following rumors of steroid use. De Merode told The New York Times that Manfred Donike, who was at that time considered to be the foremost expert on drugs and sports, failed to discover any banned substances during that testing. The World Anti-Doping Agency was created in the 1990s, removing control of drug testing from the IOC and De Merode. De Merode later stated: "We performed all possible and imaginable analyses on her. We never found anything. There should not be the slightest suspicion."

In 2017, European Athletics Council president Svein Arne Hansen and other officials stated that they planned to propose that the International Association of Athletics Federations (IAAF) ban all records that still stood from prior to 2005—the year the IAAF had mandated that athletes' blood and urine samples be retained and stored for future re-testing.

== Personal life and death ==
Griffith's nickname among her family was "Dee Dee". She was briefly engaged to hurdler Greg Foster.

In 1987, Griffith married 1984 Olympic triple-jump champion Al Joyner, whom Griffith first met at the 1980 Olympic trials. Through her marriage to Joyner, she was sister-in-law to track-and-field athlete Jackie Joyner-Kersee. Griffith and Joyner had one daughter together, Mary Ruth Joyner, born November 15, 1990.

Griffith Joyner's family's motto was "if you try, try again". This motto motivated Joyner to keep going. She eventually created her own motto: "Believe, Achieve, Succeed". Mary Joyner has described her mother as a calm spirit, stating "when she enter[ed] a room, you would feel this aura of calmness and happiness. She brought everybody together."

=== Death ===
On September 21, 1998, Griffith Joyner died in her sleep at home in the Canyon Crest neighborhood of Mission Viejo, California, at the age of 38. The unexpected death was investigated by the Orange County Sheriff-Coroner's office, which on September 22 declared the cause of death to be suffocation during a severe epileptic seizure.

Griffith Joyner was found to have had a cavernous hemangioma, a congenital vascular brain abnormality that made her predisposed to seizures. According to a family attorney, she had a tonic–clonic seizure in 1990 and had been treated for seizures in 1993 and 1994. According to the Sheriff-Coroner's office, the only drugs in her system when she died were small amounts of two common over-the-counter drugs, acetaminophen and the antihistamine Benadryl.

== Legacy ==
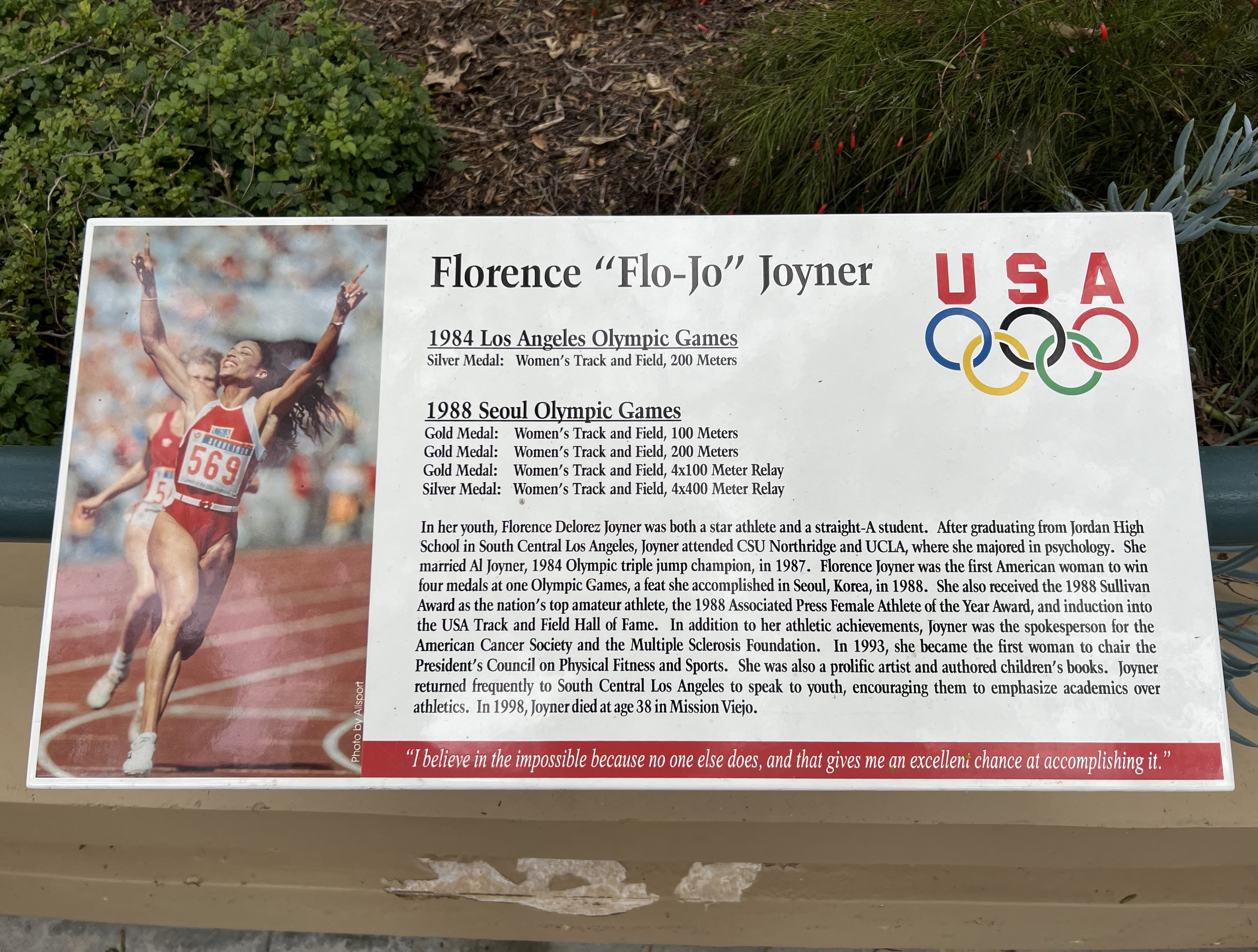
A plaque honoring Griffith Joyner at Florence Joyner Olympiad Park in Mission Viejo, California

USA Track & Field inducted her into its Hall of Fame in 1995. In 2000, the 102nd Street School in Los Angeles was renamed Florence Griffith Joyner Elementary School. Griffith Joyner had attended the school as a child. The city of Mission Viejo dedicated a park at the entrance to her neighborhood in her honor. Griffith Joyner was also an artist and painter. Her work has been on display as part the Art of The Olympians (AOTO). She is one of two posthumous members of AOTO, the other being the founder and Olympian, Al Oerter. In Time's 2020 list of the most influential women of the past century, she was named Woman of the Year for 1988.

== Statistics ==
=== Olympic Games and trials results ===
Race	Venue	Date	Round	Time	Wind	WR
100 m	Indianapolis	July 16, 1988	Qualifying heat	10.60w	+3.2	
100 m	Indianapolis	July 16, 1988	Quarter-final	10.49	±0.0	WR
100 m	Indianapolis	July 17, 1988	Semi-final	10.70	+1.6	
100 m	Indianapolis	July 17, 1988	Final	10.61	+1.2	
100 m	Seoul	September 24, 1988	Qualifying heat	10.88	+1.0	
100 m	Seoul	September 24, 1988	Quarter-final	10.62	+1.0	
100 m	Seoul	September 25, 1988	Semi-final	10.70w	+2.6	
100 m	Seoul	September 25, 1988	Final	10.54w	+3.0	
200 m	Indianapolis	July 22, 1988	Qualifying heat	21.96	+0.6	
200 m	Indianapolis	July 22, 1988	Quarter-final	21.77	−0.1	
200 m	Indianapolis	July 23, 1988	Semi-final	21.90w	+2.4	
200 m	Indianapolis	July 23, 1988	Final	21.85	+1.3	
200 m	Seoul	September 28, 1988	Qualifying heat	22.51	NWI	
200 m	Seoul	September 28, 1988	Quarter-final	21.76	+0.7	
200 m	Seoul	September 29, 1988	Semi-final	21.56	+1.7	WR
200 m	Seoul	September 29, 1988	Final	21.34	+1.3	WR
100 m relay ( 4 × 100 m relay )	Seoul	October 1, 1988	Semi-final	(team time 42.12)		
100 m relay ( 4 × 100 m relay )	Seoul	October 1, 1988	Final	(team time 41.98)		
400 m relay split ( 4 × 400 m relay )	Seoul	October 1, 1988	Final	48.08 (team time 3:15.51)		

=== International competitions ===
Year	Competition	Venue	Position	Event	Time	Notes
1983	World Championships	(Finland) Helsinki	4th	200 m	22.46	wind +1.5

=== Season's bests ===
Year	100 meters	200 meters	400 meters
1982	11.12	22.39	—
1983	11.06	22.23	50.94
1984	10.99	22.04	—
1985	11.00	22.50	50.89
1986	11.42	23.51	—
1987	10.96	21.96	—
1988	10.49	21.34	52.50

== See also ==
- History of African Americans in Los Angeles

== Notes ==
Records
Preceded by (United States) Evelyn Ashford	Women's 100 m world record holder July 16, 1988 – present	Incumbent
Preceded by (East Germany) Marita Koch	Women's 200 m world record holder September 29, 1988 – present	Incumbent
Awards and achievements
Preceded by (West Germany) Steffi Graf	United Press International; Athlete of the Year; 1988	Succeeded by (West Germany) Steffi Graf
Preceded by (United States) Jackie Joyner-Kersee	Women's Track & Field Athlete of the Year; 1988	Succeeded by (Cuba) Ana Fidelia Quirot
Preceded by ~~(Canada) Ben Johnson~~	L'Équipe Champion of Champions; 1988	Succeeded by (United States) Greg LeMond
Sporting positions
Preceded by (East Germany) Silke Möller	Women's 200 m best year performance 1988	Succeeded by (United States) Dawn Sowell
