= International Society of Olympic Historians =

Sports history organization

The International Society of Olympic Historians (ISOH) is a non-profit organization founded in 1991 with the purpose of promoting and studying the Olympic Movement and the Olympic Games. The majority of recent books on the Olympic Games have been written by ISOH members. The ISOH publishes the Journal of Olympic History (JOH, formerly Citius, Altius, Fortius) three times a year.

== History ==
The International Society of Olympic Historians was formed as the result of a meeting in London, England, in December 1991. The idea of forming an Olympic historical society had been the subject of correspondence – mainly between Bill Mallon (United States) and Ture Widlund (Sweden) – for many years. On Thursday, 5 December 1991, a group of potential members met at the Duke of Clarence, a small pub in the Kensington district. Those present were Ian Buchanan (Great Britain), Stan Greenberg (Great Britain), Ove Karlsson (Sweden), Bill Mallon (United States), Peter Matthews (Great Britain), David Wallechinsky (United States), and Ture Widlund (Sweden). The invited guests who sent regrets were: Anthony Bijkerk (Netherlands), Peter Diamond (United States), Pim Huurman (Netherlands), Erich Kamper (Austria), Volker Kluge (Germany), John Lucas (United States), and Wolf Lyberg (Sweden).

ISOH was formed with the purpose of promoting and studying the Olympic Movement and the Olympic Games. This purpose is achieved primarily through research into their history, the gathering of historical and statistical data concerning the Olympic Movement and Olympic Games and the publication of the research via journals and other publications, and through the cooperation of the membership.

Ian Buchanan was the first ISOH. In 2000, he was succeeded by Bill Mallon. Subsequently the sports historian and academic Dr. Karl Lennartz (Germany) was elected President, serving from 2004 to 2012.Broadcaster and writer David Wallechinsky (United States) led the organisation from 2012 to 2020. Since then, archaeologist and sports historian Dr. Christian Wacker (Germany) has been president.

== Journal of Olympic History ==
The ISOH publishes the Journal of Olympic History (formerly Citius, Altius, Fortius).This is produced three times a year and is supported by a website: www.isoh.org

=== Notable members ===
- Raleigh DeGeer Amyx, collector of Olympic memorabilia
- Bob Barney, university professor and founder of the International Center for Olympic Studies
- Bruce Kidd, Olympian and university professor.

== See also ==
- Sports history organizations
