= Michael McLaughlin =

Michael or Mike McLaughlin may refer to:

- Michael McLaughlin (activist) (born c. 1940), British far-right activist.
- Michael McLaughlin (author) (1948–2002), American cookbook writer
- Michael McLaughlin (pianist), on the 2003 album The Unknown Masada
- Bo McLaughlin (Michael Duane McLaughlin, born 1953), American baseball relief pitcher
- Mike McLaughlin (racing driver) (born 1956), American racing driver
- Mike McLaughlin (basketball) (born 1966), American basketball player and coach
- Mike McLaughlin (American football) (born 1987), American football fullback for the Denver Broncos
- Mike McLaughlin (cinematographer), Canadian cinematographer

== See also ==
- Michael A. McLachlan (born 1958), Connecticut state legislator
- Mike McLachlan (1946–2021), Colorado state legislator
