= Bert Nelson (publisher) =

American publisher and writer

Albert "Bert" Nelson (born November 17, 1921, in San Diego, California – January 9, 1994) was an American publisher and writer. In 1948, after graduating from the University of California, Berkeley, he was a co-founder of Track & Field News, along with his brother Cordner. The upstart magazine's first headquarters were Cordner's garage in San Bruno, California. The magazine covers the sport of track and field and other aspects of the umbrella of athletics. The monthly magazine has declared itself to be "The Bible of the Sport".

Bert had run the 880-yard dash in high school and continued to the cross-country team at Berkeley. Returning from the Navy after World War II he first got his feet wet starting a small newspaper before the brothers began the magazine. Bert became one of the top writers of the sport.

Starting in 1960, he established TAFNEWS Press, which went on to become the nation's leading track and field publisher. The company has over 100 titles. The first of those was the Little Red Book. Within the sport, the book was as important as Chairman Mao's Book, but this book provided conversions between the metric system that are used in the sport worldwide and the imperial units that are still common in America. The next book was the Little Gold Book which converted decathlon scores.

Nelson was inducted into the National Track and Field Hall of Fame in 1991.
