= Sheila Lukins =

American cook and food writer

Sheila Lukins (November 18, 1942 – August 30, 2009), was an American cook and food writer. She was most famous as the co-author, with Julee Rosso, of The Silver Palate series of cookbooks, and The New Basics Cookbook, a very popular set of food guides which introduced many Americans to Mediterranean and Eastern European cooking techniques and ingredients and popularized a richer and very boldly seasoned style of cooking to Americans in sharp contrast to the health-food movements of the 1970s. Together, their books sold more than seven million copies.

She was also the co-founder and owner of the popular Silver Palate gourmet shop in New York City and, for 23 years, the food editor and columnist for Parade, a position previously held by Julia Child.

== Early life and education ==
Born Sheila Gail Block in Philadelphia in 1942, she grew up in Norwalk and Westport, Connecticut. She studied art at the Tyler School of Art, the School of Visual Arts and New York University, where she earned a bachelor's degree with honor in Art Education. After graduation she attended Le Cordon Bleu in London, England, while working in graphic design. Her culinary education continued in France, where she worked alongside Michelin-starred chefs in Bordeaux.

== Career ==
When she and her husband returned to New York City, she opened a catering business called The Other Woman and specialized in bold Mediterranean and Eastern European flavors, which at the time were unfamiliar to many Americans. She was hired by Julee Rosso for a catering job. In 1977 she and Rosso opened and ran a gourmet food shop at the corner of Columbus Avenue and 73rd Street in New York City called The Silver Palate. The shop, along with other similar shops of the era, such as Dean & DeLuca, Oakville Grocery, and Jamail's, is credited with creating and popularizing the field of upscale prepared foods sometimes called "carryout cuisine".

In the 1980s she and Rosso wrote, with Michael McLaughlin, The Silver Palate Cookbook, which broke cookbook records by selling 250,000 copies in its first year and went on to sell as of 2009 2.5-million copies, followed by The Silver Palate Good Times Cookbook, and others. Lukins drew the illustrations for all the Silver Palate cookbooks and her solo cookbooks. The original cookbook contained Lukins' signature recipe, Chicken Marbella, and according to Parade at the time of Lukins' death was among the top ten bestselling cookbooks of all time. The Silver Palate Cookbooks are considered to have influenced the 1980s trend of middle-class Americans treating cooking as a hobby and are widely credited with changing how Americans cooked.

In 1986, she and Rosso succeeded Julia Child to share the position of food editor for Parade; after 1991 Lukins held the position solo until 1999. After 11 years working together, Rosso and Lukins split up in early 1990s in a widely reported feud.

The Silver Palate shop, which had been sold to new owners in 1988, closed in 1993, although a brand of sauces and condiments bearing its name continued to be sold as of 2024. During this period Lukins published her own successful series of books including Sheila Lukins' All Round the World Cookbook and Celebrate! In 2007 she reunited with Rosso to publish a new 25th-anniversary edition of The Silver Palate Cookbook. Combined, Lukins' cookbooks and those she wrote with Rosso had sold 7 million copies by 2009.

== Recognition ==
Her 1986 cookbook with Rosso, The Silver Palate Good Times Cookbook, won a James Beard Award. In 1992 their The Silver Palate Cookbook was named to the Cookbook Hall of Fame. In 1992 Lukins was inducted into Who's Who of Food & Beverage in America and in 1995 was named "an American food legend" by the Beard Foundation. In 1998 Lukins' U.S.A. Cookbook was nominated for a Beard Award.

== Personal life ==
In December 1991, she suffered a cerebral hemorrhage due to a 'berry' aneurysm which paralyzed most of her left side and nearly took her life. Some after-effects lasted for the rest of her life, but she was able to recover sufficiently to resume her position at Parade and to continue to write books.

She was married for many years to Richard Lukins, a security systems expert, with whom she had two daughters, Annabel and Molly. After the sale of the shop Lukins lived and worked from her apartment at The Dakota. In June 2009, at age 66, she was diagnosed with brain cancer. She died on August 30, 2009, at her home in Manhattan, surrounded by her children.

== Books ==
=== with Julee Rosso ===
- The Silver Palate Cookbook, 1982 (Named to the Cookbook Hall of Fame in 1992)
- The Silver Palate Good Times Cookbook, 1984 (Winner of the James Beard award in the "Entertaining" category in 1986)
- The New Basics Cookbook, 1989
- Silver Palate Desserts, 1995

=== By Sheila Lukins ===
- Sheila Lukins' All Round the World Cookbook, 1994
- USA Cookbook, 1997
- Celebrate!, 2003
- Ten: all the foods we love and ten perfect recipes for each, 2008
