= Cordner Nelson =

American publisher and writer

Cordner Nelson (August 6, 1918 in San Diego, California – October 26, 2009 in Carmel-by-the-Sea, California) was an American publisher and writer. In 1948, after graduating from the College of the Pacific he was a co-founder of Track & Field News, along with his brother Bert. The upstart magazine's first headquarters were brother Bert's garage in San Bruno, California. The magazine covers the sport of track and field and other aspects of the umbrella of athletics. The monthly magazine has declared itself to be "The Bible of the Sport". Cordner served as the publisher of the magazine until 1969.

In 1985, he co-authored "The Milers", which covers the history of the mile and 1500 metres races from the 19th century until 1984.

Nelson was inducted into the National Track and Field Hall of Fame in 1988.
