= List of sports history organisations =

The following is a list of sports history organizations.

== Sports ==
=== Athletics Track & Field ===
- Association of Track and Field Statisticians

=== Baseball ===
- Society for American Baseball Research

=== Basketball ===
- Association for Professional Basketball Research

=== American football ===
- Professional Football Researchers Association

=== Association football ===
- English National Football Archive
- International Federation of Football History & Statistics
- Rec.Sport.Soccer Statistics Foundation

=== Canadian football ===
- Canadian Football Historical Association

=== Ice hockey ===
- Hockey Research Association
- Society for International Hockey Research

=== Olympic Games ===
- International Society of Olympic Historians

=== General sports ===
- H.J. Lutcher Stark Center for Physical Culture and Sports at The University of Texas at Austin
- North American Society for Sport History
