= Michael McLaughlin (author) =

American food writer and cookbook author

Michael McLaughlin (1948/9 – c. June 25, 2002) was an American food writer and cookbook author. Born in Wray, Colorado, he moved to New York City in 1981 to pursue a career as a food writer. Working at a local gourmet shop on the Upper West Side, he worked with the shop's owners, Julee Rosso and Sheila Lukins, to publish The Silver Palate Cookbook in 1983. The book has sold in excess of 2 million copies. One year later, he opened his own restaurant in Greenwich Village, the Manhattan Chili Company, emphasizing innovative Southwest fare.

Later, he began writing about food, and was a regular contributor to Gourmet, Bon Appetit, and Food & Wine magazines. He also wrote or co-wrote more than 20 cookbooks during his career, including The Manhattan Chili Company Southwest American Cookbook, The New American Cookbook, The Back of the Box Gourmet #1 and #2, The El Paso Chili Company's Texas Border Cookbook, Fifty-two Meat Loaves, Cooking for the Weekend, The Mushroom Book, The Little Book of Big Sandwiches and The Jimtown Store Cookbook. McLaughlin lived and wrote for many years at his home in the Park Slope section of Brooklyn, New York, before relocating to Santa Fe, New Mexico, where he continued writing and working as a book buyer for a local housewares retailer.

McLaughlin died of natural causes, aged 53, at his home in Santa Fe.
