= Howard Schmertz =

Meet director of the Millrose Games
- In office 1975–2014
- Preceded by: Fred Schmertz
- Succeeded by: David Katz

Personal details
- Born: Howard Miles Schmertz; June 9, 1925; Bronx, New York, U.S.
- Died: March 27, 2014 (aged 88); Port Washington, New York, U.S.

Howard Miles Schmertz (June 9, 1925 – March 27, 2014) was the meet director for the Millrose Games from 1975 to 2003. He succeeded his father, Fred Schmertz in the role.

Under the direction of Howard and his father, the Millrose Games has become one of the world's foremost international indoor track and field meets.

In 2007, he was inducted into the Millrose Games Hall of Fame, again alongside his father.

In 2012, Schmertz was inducted into the United States Track and Field Hall of Fame alongside his father.
