= Darrell Robinson =

American sprinter

Personal information
- Born: December 23, 1963 (age 62) Tacoma, Washington, U.S.

Sport
- Sport: Track and field
- Event: 400 metres
- College team: Houston Cougars
Medal record
Men's athletics
Representing the United States
Goodwill Games
Bronze medal – third place	1986 Moscow	400 m

Darrell Robinson (born December 23, 1963) is an American former track and field athlete who specialized in the 400-meter dash. He set a US high school national record of 44.69 seconds in the 400 m at the age of 18. He was in the world's top-five 400 m runners in 1985 and 1986. He won a bronze medal at the 1986 Goodwill Games, and won races at numerous high-profile track meetings.

In 1989 he accused Carl Lewis, Florence Griffith-Joyner, and Bob Kersee (among others) of using or distributing performance-enhancing drugs. The accusations, which were never substantiated, brought an end to his career at the age of 25.

== Early life ==
While attending Woodrow Wilson High School in Tacoma, Washington, Robinson ran a United States high school record of 44.69 seconds in the 400 m at the age of eighteen. This mark, set at the 1982 National Sports Festival in Indianapolis, was also a world junior record for the distance. Furthermore, his time was the second fastest 400 m run by any athlete that year, one-hundredth behind Sunder Nix who had beaten him in the race. He also received the Governor's Trophy for Outstanding Male Athlete for his performance in the 400 m at the Golden West Invitational that year. He was Track and Field News "High School Athlete of the Year" in 1982.

Robinson went on to study at the University of Houston, but he left after the sprint coach who recruited him resigned. After a short stint at the University of Washington, he went to UCLA in mid-1985, majoring in music. He missed making the final of the 1984 Olympic Trials, finishing 6th in the semis.

== Breakthrough season ==
In 1985, Robinson ran a season's best of 44.71 seconds to finish behind Innocent Egbunike in Los Angeles – a time which ranked him as the fifth fastest 400 m runner that year. He began training with Chuck DeBus and 1986 proved to be a breakthrough for Robinson. He competed at the Mt. SAC Relays in early May and recorded 20.41 seconds over 200 meters. He joined a strong 400 m line-up at the Pepsi Invitational later that month, which also featured Gabriel Tiacoh, Antonio McKay, Michael Franks and Egbunike, and all were intent on breaking Alberto Juantorena's time of 44.26 (the fastest run at sea level). Robinson led over the first 200 m at a world-record-pace of 21.4 seconds. However, Tiacoh managed to overhaul him in the last straight, but Robinson's time of 44.45 seconds to finish as runner-up was a still personal record. The race was the quickest that year, and Tiacoh and Robinson's times ranked them first and second on the season's lists, respectively.

He went on to win at the USA Outdoor Track and Field Championships in Eugene, Oregon later that summer, winning the race in a time of 44.47 seconds. Next came the inaugural 1986 Goodwill Games and he won the 400 m bronze medal behind compatriots McKay and Clarence Daniel. Robinson took on an intensive schedule on the European track and field circuit during the months of August and September that year. He ran a number of sub-45 second times and won races at: the Weltklasse Zürich meeting (44.69), the ISTAF meet in Berlin (44.86), the Memorial Van Damme in Brussels (44.82), and Athletissima in Lausanne (44.96). His winning streak was brought to a halt at the London Grand Prix, where he and Andre Phillips both ran 45.00 seconds, but Phillips was awarded the victory. He closed his season with another 400 m win in 45.15 seconds at a meeting in Tokyo in mid-September.

== Accusations of drug use ==
Robinson did not compete in 1987, but he returned in mid-1988 and recorded a time of 44.99 seconds in Indianapolis and ran 45.11 seconds for fourth place in Athens, Greece, behind Roberto Hernández of Cuba. But for a second time he failed to get to the finals of the Olympic Trials, despite having the 7th best time in the semi-final round (he finished 5th in his heat when four in each semi went to the final).

In late 1989, Robinson gave an interview with Stern in West Germany accusing a number of figures in American track and field of using and distributing performance-enhancing drugs. In October, The Athletics Congress (later USA Track & Field) had allowed the voluntary resignation of Robinson's former coach Chuck DeBus for giving banned substances to his athletes. Robinson said in Stern that, while staying at his house in 1982, he had seen Carl Lewis inject himself with a white fluid – what he believed to be testosterone. Furthermore, he said he had seen Tom Tellez (Lewis' coach) distribute blue pills to his athletes and claimed that these were banned steroids. Robinson had begun training with Bob Kersee in 1987 and he claimed that the coach had advised him on steroid use and given him two types of tablets: oxandrolone and metandienone. Robinson also claimed that he had personally sold a 10-cubic centimetre vial of human growth hormone to Florence Griffith-Joyner in March 1988, just months before she ran two world records and won an Olympic gold medal.

Lewis levelled a libel suit worth US$182 million against the German magazine in December 1989. Griffith-Joyner, Tellez and Bob Kersee denied the claims, but Florence Griffith-Joyner did not issue legal proceedings. The accused questioned Robinson's motives in that he received $50,000 for the interview with Stern, as well as $10,000 for appearing on Today on NBC to discuss the matter. Robinson was also close friends with Charlie Francis – the former coach of Ben Johnson.

The accusations brought about the end of Robinson's career at the age of 25 as he was largely blacklisted by promoters on the European track circuit. He stood by the statements he had made in his interviews.

== Personal life ==
Robinson's personal life grew increasingly difficult after his retirement. One of his children was beaten to death by the mother. And when his daughter, by another woman, moved to Canada he was blocked from seeing her. An attempt to take his daughter back to the United States resulted in charges for assault and abduction, for which he served five months in jail.

He began seeing a psychiatrist in Tacoma, but twice attempted suicide in 1996.

He married former US skier Lisl Hager in the late 1990s and retreated from public life, refusing to take calls from the press and asking to be left alone.

Awards
Preceded by Joe Dial	Track & Field News High School Boys Athlete of the Year; 1982	Succeeded by Clinton Davis
Records
Preceded by (United States) Wayne Collett	Men's World Junior Record Holder, 400 metres 24 July 1982 – 22 May 1988	Succeeded by (United States) Steve Lewis
