= The Armory Foundation =

The Armory Foundation is a non-profit organization located in New York City that operates the historic Fort Washington Avenue Armory. The Armory hosts over 100 track meets and over 220,000 athlete visits each year, including the prestigious Millrose Games. The Armory is home to more track & field records than any other facility in the world.

The Armory Foundation also operates the Armory College Prep program, an unscreened and no-cost afterschool educational program for New York City students from underserved communities. Over the past four years, 100% of the high school seniors in Armory College Prep gained admittance to four-year colleges, receiving on average scholarships and grants for more than 70% of the full, four-year cost. Armory College Prep provides high school students with rigorous academics, test prep, and college counseling. Armory College Prep for middle school students provides math, robotics, video game design, and reading for children from the Washington Heights, Inwood and Harlem communities. This program also provides students and their families with guidance to navigate New York City's high school admission process. Community children in fifth grade take part in the Great Minds program that focuses on reading and robotics.

The Armory Foundation also offers twice weekly no-cost fitness and beginning track & field programs for hundreds of children in grades 2 to 8 in its Tiny Feet, Little Feet and CityTrack programs. The Armory provides experienced coaches to closely guide the children, schedule special activity days, and promote a lifelong commitment to exercise and healthy lifestyles.

In addition to track & field events and its educational activity, The Armory Foundation utilizes is venue for a variety of community and special events. The Armory is a modernized four-story building with numerous event spaces, including a 65,000-square-foot (6,000 m^{2}) arena, nearly 3,000 balcony seats, an in-house cafe, and a 69-seat theater.

The Armory Foundation was established in 1992 by Dr. Norbert Sander Jr., an internist who was the winner of the 1974 New York City Marathon. Sander spearheaded an effort to revitalize The Armory, which had fallen into disrepair during the 1980s. He was able to secure $25 million from a variety of public and private sources to refurbish the building, leading to the installation of a modern, banked track, as well as a new learning center. Sander continued to lead the Foundation until his death in 2017. The organization is now led by Co-Presidents Rita Finkel and Jonathan Schindel.

The Armory Foundation is funded by a combination of City grants, corporate sponsors, and individual donors.
