= Fred Schmertz =

Meet director of the Millrose Games
- In office 1934–1974
- Preceded by: John G. Anderson
- Succeeded by: Howard Schmertz

Personal details
- Born: November 10, 1888
- Died: March 25, 1976 (aged 87)

Fred Schmertz (November 10, 1888 – March 25, 1976) was a founder member of the Millrose Athletic Association in 1908 and the Millrose Games in 1914. For the latter, he was a meet director between 1934 and 1974.

Schmertz acted as an assistant meet director for the Millrose Games from 1915 before acting as a director. He was succeeded in the role of a director by his son, Howard Schmertz. The Millrose Games has become one of the world's foremost international indoor track and field meets.

From 1928, Schmertz also acted in an official capacity for several United States Olympic teams.

Schmertz was inducted posthumously into the International Jewish Sports Hall of Fame in 1989, the Millrose Games Hall of Fame in 2003, and with his son Howard, the United States Track and Field Hall of Fame in 2012.

He was buried in Mount Hebron Cemetery, in Queens, New York.
