= Ove Karlsson (sports journalist) =

Swedish sports journalist (1944–2021)

Ove Karlsson (approximately "oo-vay kahwl-son", born 25 April 1944, died 24 April 2021) was a sports journalist and Olympic historian from Sweden. He was working as a journalist for more than 50 years. Since the 1970s, he was also involved in the Swedish Olympic Committee's team guides and official reports. In 1991, he was a founding member of the ISOH (International Society of Olympic Historians). In 1994, he was also a founding president of the Olympic Section of the SIHSS (Swedish Ice hockey Historical and Statistical Society).

== Biography ==
In 1944, Ove Karlsson was born in Motala, Sweden.

In 1964 (age 20), he started his career in sports journalism in Stockholm, where he resided ever since.

From 1967 to 1993 (age 23 to 49), he was involved in media service organisation at major international sports events in Sweden. Since the 1970s, he has been involved in the Swedish Olympic Committee's team guides and official reports (the Olympiaboken, "Olympic Books"). From 1973 to 1981 (age 29 to 37), he was a member of the Executive Committee of the AIPS (Association Internationale de la Presse Sportive, the International Organization of the Sports Press). In 1980 (age 36), he was press attaché of Sweden's Olympic teams.

In 1986 (age 42), he was a founding member of SOF (Sveriges Olympiahistorikers Förening, the Swedish Society of Olympic Historians), and its secretary from 1986 to 1988 (age 42 to 44).

In 1991 (age 47), he was a founding member of the ISOH (International Society of Olympic Historians). He wrote articles for the ISOH's Journal of Olympic History (formerly Citius, Altius, Fortius), especially the obituaries of Olympians. In 2004 (age 60), he became officer of the ISOH, on the 2004–2008 Executive Committee.

In 1994 (age 50), he was a founding president of the SIHSS (Swedish Ice hockey Historical and Statistical Society). As of 2007, he his still president of the Olympic Section of the SIHSS.

== Journalism ==
Ove Karlsson was working as a sports journalist in Stockholm for more than 40 years:

- 1964–1966: at Idrottsbladet, sports paper
- 1967–1971: at Associated Press, news agency
- 1971–1976: at Svensk Idrott, official magazine of the Swedish Sports Confederation
- 1976–1991: at Brunnhages (later Strömbergs/Brunnhages), publishing house, mainly with Idrottsboken and Olympiaboken
- 1991–2021: as a free-lance, including for the International Society of Olympic Historians, the Swedish Ice hockey Historical and Statistical Society, the Swedish Olympic Committee, and the Swedish Ice hockey Historical and Statistical Society.

== Bibliography ==
Publications include:

- 1980: Guldboken: om alla våra olympiamästare, 1896-1980. ISBN 91-7198-046-6. With Ulf Pettersson and Bengt Folkesson Ahlbom.
- 1980: Olympiaboken 1980: officiell redogörelse i samråd med Sveriges Olympiska Kommitté. ISBN 91-7198-048-2. With Sven-Ulf Pettersson.
- 1996: Swedish Olympic team: games of the XXVIth Olympiad. For the Swedish Olympic Committee.
- 1996: Quiz, vad vet du om olympiska sommarspel - 300 frågor och svar (Vällingby: Strömbergs Bokförlag). A quiz book on the Olympic summer Games.
- 2008: OS - historia och statistik (Stockholm: Norstedts). ISBN 91-1-301750-0. With Sune Sylvén. A history of the Olympic summer Games.
- 2010: Vinter-OS - historia och statistik (Stockholm: Norstedts). ISBN 91-1-302166-4. With Sune Sylvén. A history of the Olympic winter Games.
