= Julee Rosso =

American cook and food writer

Julee Rosso is an American cook and food writer. In 1977 she and Sheila Lukins opened and ran a gourmet food shop in New York City called The Silver Palate. In the 1980s they wrote The Silver Palate Cookbook, The Silver Palate Good Times Cookbook, and others. A 25th Anniversary update of the Silver Palate Cookbook was published in 2007.

"She changed the way America eats." - New York Newsday

== Early life ==
Julee Rosso graduated from Michigan State University where she was a member of the Beta Beta chapter of Alpha Phi. Julee was the owner of the Wickwood Inn in Saugatuck, Michigan from 1991 to 2021.

== Books ==
=== with Sheila Lukins ===
- The Silver Palate Cookbook, 1979
- The Silver Palate Good Times Cookbook, 1984 (Winner, James Beard award "Entertaining" in 1986)
- The New Basics Cookbook, 1989
- Silver Palate Desserts, 1995

=== By Julee Rosso ===
- Great Good Food, 1993
- Fresh Start, 1996
- Fresh Start for Meat & Fish , 1997
- Fresh Start for Vegetables, 1997
- Fresh Start for Grains & Pasta, 1997
- Fresh Start for Poultry, 1997
- Fresh Start for Soup, 1997
- Fresh Start for Fruit
- Fresh Start - Special Markets, 1996
- Fresh Start : Low fat Food and Menus Day to Day
