= Jackie Joyner-Kersee =

American track and field athlete (born 1962)

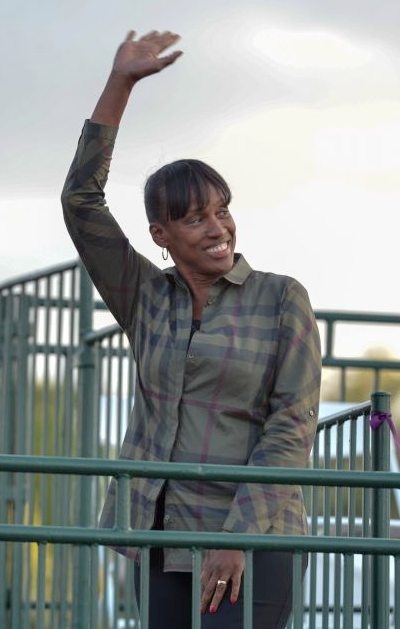
- Joyner-Kersee in 2014

Personal information
- Born: March 3, 1962 (age 64) East St. Louis, Illinois, U.S.
- Height: 5 ft 10 in (178 cm)
- Weight: 154 lb (70 kg)

Sport
- Country: United States
- Sport: Athletics
- Events: Long jump, heptathlon
- College team: UCLA (1980–1985)
- Club: Tiger World Class Athletic Club; West Coast Athletic Club; McDonald's Track Club
Medal record
Women's athletics
Representing United States
Olympic Games
Gold medal – first place	1988 Seoul	Heptathlon
Gold medal – first place	1988 Seoul	Long jump
Gold medal – first place	1992 Barcelona	Heptathlon
Silver medal – second place	1984 Los Angeles	Heptathlon
Bronze medal – third place	1992 Barcelona	Long jump
Bronze medal – third place	1996 Atlanta	Long jump
World Championships
Gold medal – first place	1987 Rome	Long jump
Gold medal – first place	1987 Rome	Heptathlon
Gold medal – first place	1991 Tokyo	Long jump
Gold medal – first place	1993 Stuttgart	Heptathlon
Goodwill Games
Gold medal – first place	1986 Moscow	Heptathlon
Gold medal – first place	1990 Seattle	Heptathlon
Gold medal – first place	1994 Saint Petersburg	Heptathlon
Gold medal – first place	1998 New York	Heptathlon
Pan American Games
Gold medal – first place	1987 Indianapolis	Long jump

Jacqueline Joyner-Kersee, née Joyner, (born March 3, 1962) is an American former track and field athlete who competed in both the heptathlon and long jump. She won three gold, one silver, and two bronze Olympic medals at four different Olympic Games. Joyner-Kersee was also a four-time gold medalist (twice each in heptathlon and long jump) at the world championships. Since 1986, she has held the world record for heptathlon.

== Early life ==
Jacqueline Joyner was born March 3, 1962, in East St. Louis, Illinois, and was named after Jacqueline Kennedy, the First Lady of the United States. She was born into a poor family. She found her love for running at the age of 9 when she joined a special community track program. She played basketball, volleyball, and ran track and field in high school. As a high school athlete at East St. Louis Lincoln Senior High School, she qualified for the finals in the long jump at the 1980 Olympic Trials, finishing 8th behind another high schooler, Carol Lewis. She was inspired to compete in multi-disciplinary track & field events after seeing a movie about Babe Didrikson Zaharias. Didrikson, the track star, basketball player, and pro golfer, was chosen the "Greatest Female Athlete of the First Half of the 20th Century. Fifteen years later, Sports Illustrated for Women magazine voted Joyner-Kersee the greatest female athlete of all time, just ahead of Zaharias.

=== UCLA ===
Joyner attended college at the University of California, Los Angeles (UCLA) from 1980 to 1985 where she starred in both track & field and basketball. She attended the school on an athletic scholarship. While she was in college, her mother died suddenly of meningitis. Joyner's coach, Bob Kersee, helped Joyner grieve the loss of her mother. After she graduated, the two got married.

In basketball, she was a starter at forward for each of her first three seasons (1980–81, 81–82, and 82–83) as well as in her senior (fifth) year, 1984–1985. She redshirted during the 1983–84 academic year to concentrate on the heptathlon for the 1984 Summer Olympics. She scored 1,167 points during her collegiate career, placing her 19th all time for the Bruins games. The Bruins advanced to the West Regional semifinals of the 1985 NCAA Division I Women's Basketball Tournament before losing to eventual runner-up Georgia.

She was honored on February 21, 1998, as one of the 15 greatest players in UCLA women's basketball. In April 2001, Joyner-Kersee was voted the "Top Woman Collegiate Athlete of the Past 25 Years." The vote was conducted among the 976 NCAA member schools.

In track, Joyner won the Broderick Award (now the Honda Sports Award) as the nation's best female collegiate track and field competitor in 1983 and in 1985, and was awarded the Honda-Broderick Cup, given to the nation's best female collegiate athlete in 1985.

Joyner graduated with a bachelor's degree in history in 1986.

=== UCLA statistics ===
Legend
GP	Games played	GS	Games started	MPG	Minutes per game
FG%	Field goal percentage	3P%	3-point field goal percentage	FT%	Free throw percentage
RPG	Rebounds per game	APG	Assists per game	SPG	Steals per game
BPG	Blocks per game	PPG	Points per game	**Bold**	Career high

Year	Team	GP	Points	FG%	FT%	RPG	APG	SPG	BPG	PPG
1984–85	UCLA	29	**368**	46.5%	45.9%	**9.1**	1.4	**2.1**	0.1	**12.7**
1982–83	UCLA	28	246	41.4%	65.7%	5.6	1.8	1.0	**0.2**	8.8
1981–82	UCLA	30	239	38.1%	**67.7%**	5.8	**2.3**	1.3	0.1	8.0
1980–81	UCLA	**34**	314	**50.6%**	63.3%	4.6	2.3	1.2	0.0	9.2
Career Basketball	UCLA	121	1167	44.4%	58.5%	6.2	2.0	1.4	0.1	9.6

== Competition ==
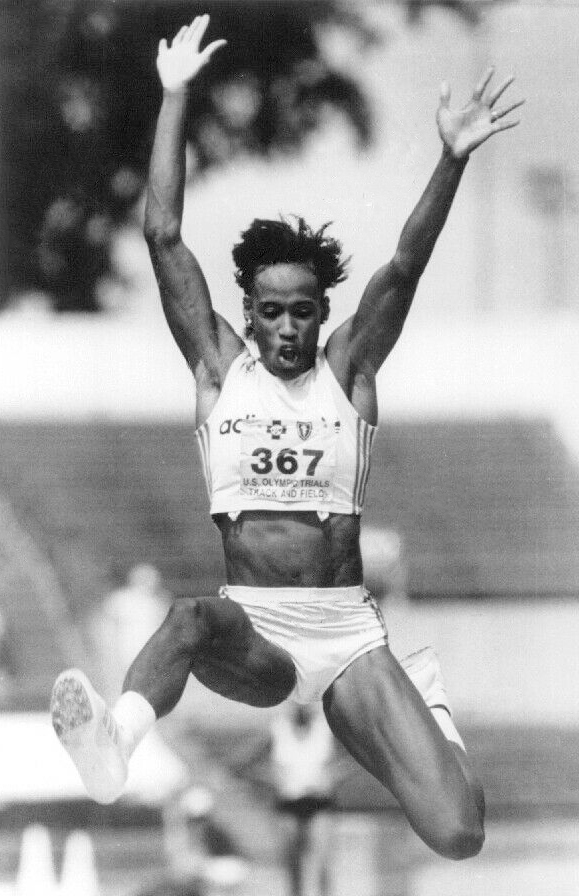
Joyner-Kersee at the 1988 Olympic Trials

=== 1984 Summer Olympics ===
Joyner competed in the 1984 Summer Olympics in Los Angeles and won the silver medal in the heptathlon. She was the favorite heading into the event, but finished five points behind Australian athlete Glynis Nunn. She also placed fifth in the long jump.

=== 1986 Goodwill Games ===
Joyner became the first woman to score over 7,000 points in a heptathlon event during the 1986 Goodwill Games. In 1986, she received the James E. Sullivan Award as the top amateur athlete in the United States.

=== 1988 Summer Olympics ===
Now known as Jackie Joyner-Kersee after marrying her coach Bob Kersee, she entered the 1988 Summer Olympics in Seoul, South Korea, and earned gold medals in both the heptathlon and the long jump. At the Games, she set the still-standing heptathlon world record of 7,291 points. Five days later, Joyner-Kersee won her second gold medal, leaping to an Olympic record of 7.40 m (24 ft 3 1/4 in) in the long jump. She was the first American woman to earn a gold medal in long jump as well as the first American woman to earn a gold medal in heptathlon.

At the 1988 Games she faced allegations of drug use from Brazilian runner Joaquim Cruz. This continued the following season in 1989 when Darrell Robinson accused Joyner-Kersee's husband and coach, Bobby Kersee, of distributing performance-enhancing drugs. Years later, doping insider Victor Conte asserted that in 1988 he personally witnessed an Olympic official at the Seoul games notifying Bobby Kersee that Joyner-Kersee had tested positive for PED use. Joyner-Kersee has consistently maintained that she competed throughout her career without performance-enhancing drugs.

=== 1991 World Championships ===
During the long jump event at the 1991 World Championships, having already won with a 7.32 m (24 ft 1/4 in) jump, Joyner-Kersee slipped on the take-off board and careened headfirst into the pit. She strained a hamstring and subsequently pulled out of the heptathlon during the 200 m at the end of the first day.

=== 1992 Summer Olympics ===
In the 1992 Summer Olympics in Barcelona, Spain, Joyner-Kersee earned her second Olympic gold medal in the heptathlon. She also won the bronze medal in the long jump which was won by her friend Heike Drechsler of Germany.

=== 1996 Summer Olympics ===
At the Olympic Trials, Joyner-Kersee sustained an injury to her right hamstring. When the 1996 Summer Olympics in Atlanta began, Joyner-Kersee was not fully recovered by the time the heptathlon started. After running the first event, the 100 m hurdles, she withdrew due to pain. She was able to recover to compete in the long jump; her final jump of 7.00 m (22 ft 11 1/2 in) was vaulted into the bronze medal position.

=== Professional basketball career ===
In 1996 Joyner-Kersee signed to play pro basketball for the Richmond Rage of the fledgling American Basketball League. She appeared in 17 games, with a high of 15 points scored.

=== 1998 Goodwill Games ===
Returning to track, Joyner-Kersee won the heptathlon at the 1998 Goodwill Games, scoring 6,502 points.

=== 2000 Olympic trials ===
Two years after retiring, Joyner-Kersee tried to qualify for the long jump event at the 2000 Olympics in Sydney, Australia. She placed sixth in the trials at 21–10 ¾, and did not make the Olympic team.

== Post-athletic career ==
Joyner-Kersee is a philanthropist in children's education, racial equality and women's rights. She is a founder of the Jackie Joyner-Kersee Foundation, which encourages young people in East St. Louis to pursue athletics and academics. She collaborated with Comcast to create the Internet Essentials program in 2011, which provides high-speed internet access to low-income Americans.

In 2007, Joyner-Kersee was one of the co-founders of Athletes for Hope, a charitable organization that helps professional athletes get involved in charitable causes and inspires millions of non-athletes to volunteer and support the community.

She served on the board of directors for USA Track & Field the national governing body of the sport.

== Awards and honors ==
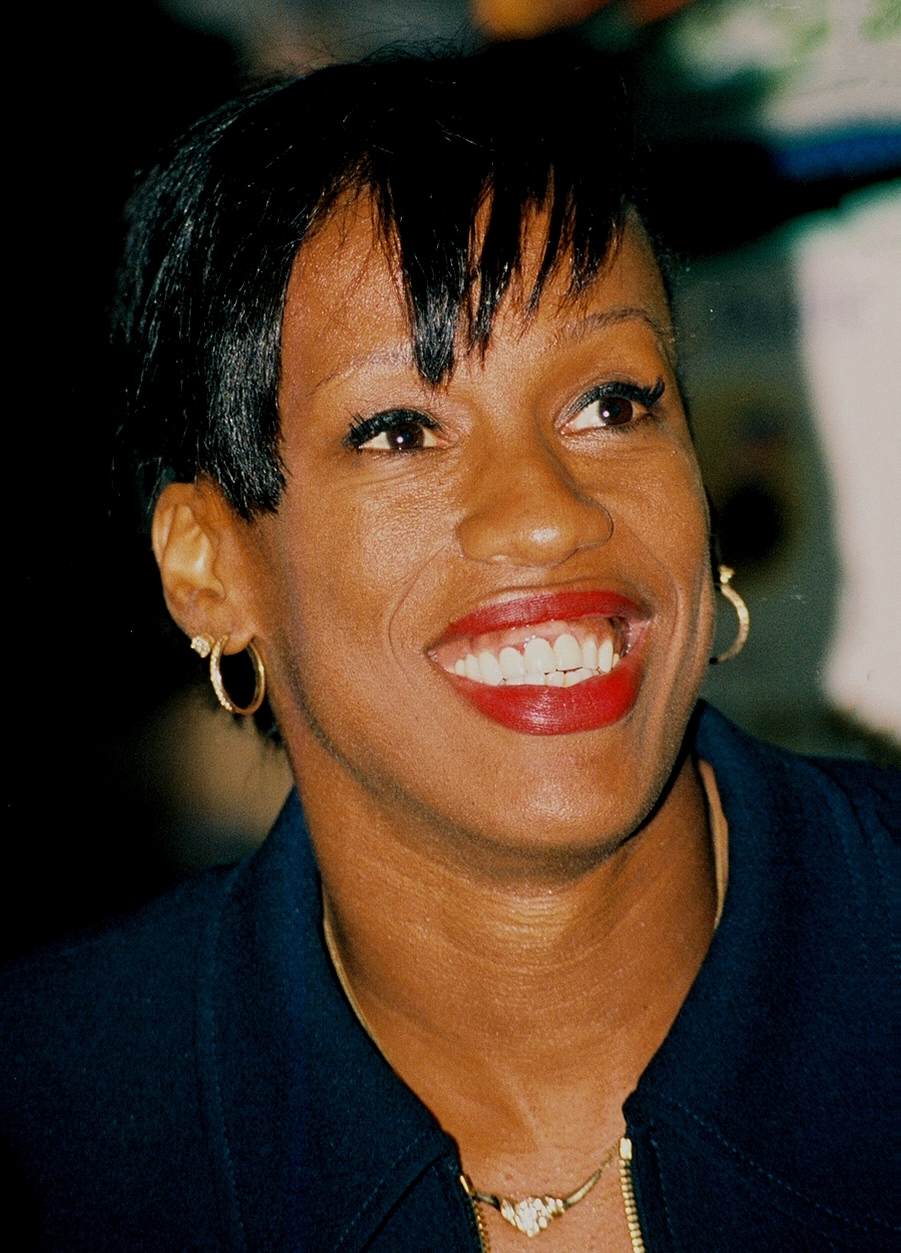
Joyner-Kersee at a 1996 book signing

- 1983 Broderick Award (now Honda Sports Award)
- 1985 Broderick Award (now Honda Sports Award)
- 1986 James E. Sullivan Award
- 1986 Jesse Owens Award
- 1987 Jesse Owens Award
- 1988 Sporting News Athlete of the Year
- 1988 Missouri Athletic Club Jack Buck Awards: Sports Personality of the Year Award and Carl O. Bauer Award
- 1989 National High School Hall of Fame inductee
- 1992 George Thomas "Mickey" Leland Award from the Congressional Black Caucus Foundation
- World Athletics Awards

World Athlete of the Year (Women): 1994

- 1997 Jack Kelly Fair Play Award
- 2000 St. Louis Walk of Fame inductee
- 2005 was inducted as a Laureate of The Lincoln Academy of Illinois and awarded the Order of Lincoln (the State's highest honor) by the Governor of Illinois in the area of Sports
- 2010 NCAA Silver Anniversary Awards honoree
- 2011 Dick Enberg Award, College Sports Information Director of America (CoSIDA)
- 2021 Webster University Doctor of Humane Letters

Since 1981, the Jesse Owens Award has been given by USATF (and before its renaming, TAC) to the United States' track and field athlete of the year. In 1996, the award was split to be given to the top athlete of each gender. In 2013, the female award was renamed the Jackie Joyner-Kersee Award. In March 2023, she was inducted into the International Sports Hall of Fame.

== Current world records ==
Joyner-Kersee holds the world record in heptathlon along with the top six all-time best results. Her long jump record of 7.49 m is second on the long jump all-time list.

== Personal bests ==
Performances table during the world record in 1988
Event	Performance	Wind	Points	Notes
100 metres hurdles	12.69 s	+0.5 m/s	1172	
Long jump	7.27 m	+0.7 m/s	1264	Heptathlon Best; highest score for a single event
High jump	1.86 m		1054	
200 m	22.56 s	+1.6 m/s	1123	
Shot put	15.80 m		915	
Javelin throw	45.66 m		776	
800 m	2 min 8.51 s		987	PB
Total			7291	WR

Personal bests

- 100 metres hurdles : 12.61 s
- Long jump : 7.49 m (still currently #2 all time, 3 cm behind the world record and she did it twice)
- High jump : 1.93 m
- 200 m : 22.30 s
- Shot put : 16.84 m
- Javelin throw : 50.12 m
- 800 m : 2 min 8.51

== Women in Sports ==
In an interview with Atlanta Journal and Constitution Joyner reflected on how women's sports have changed over the years. She stated that her high school basketball team would often have to practice late at night because the courts were reserved for the men's basketball team. Joyner noted that now women have their own leagues to play in and female athletes are paid more, not more than men though. Women's sports have become more popular over the years and have gained more attention and fan commitment. Sports like volleyball and softball are popular among female high school athletes. In the interview Joyner noted that more women are becoming involved with the business side of sports, and she herself is a registered sports agent and owns a sports marketing firm.

== TV appearances ==
In 2000, Joyner-Kersee played herself in an episode of The Jersey called "Legacy" where Nick Lighter (played by Michael Galeota) uses a magical jersey by jumping into her body as he is coached by her husband (Bob Kersee as himself) on how to put the shot for a track and field competition.

In 2023, Joyner-Kersee appeared on the PBS program Groundbreakers, hosted by Billie Jean King. She and other female athletes had one-on-one discussions about accomplishments in women's sports.

== Personal life ==
Jackie's brother is Olympic champion triple jumper Al Joyner, who was married to Olympic track champion Florence Griffith Joyner. Jackie married her track coach, Bob Kersee, in 1986.

Joyner-Kersee suffered from severe asthma throughout her athletic career.

Joyner-Kersee is an honorary member of Delta Sigma Theta sorority.

Records
Preceded by Heike Drechsler	Women's Long Jump World Record Holder equalled the 7.45 mark by Heike Drechsler; August 13, 1987 — June 11, 1988	Succeeded by Galina Chistyakova
Preceded by Sabine John	Women's Heptathlon World Record Holder; July 7, 1986 –	Succeeded by Incumbent
Awards and achievements
Preceded by Marita Koch; Wang Junxia	Women's Track & Field Athlete of the Year; 1986–1987; 1994	Succeeded by Florence Griffith Joyner; Sonia O'Sullivan
Preceded by Martina Navratilova	Flo Hyman Memorial Award; 1988	Succeeded by Evelyn Ashford
Sporting positions
Preceded by Sabine John; Larisa Nikitina	Women's Heptathlon Best Year Performance; 1984–1988; 1990–1993	Succeeded by Larisa Nikitina; Heike Drechsler
Preceded by Heike Drechsler	Women's Long Jump Best Year Performance; 1987; 1994; 1996	Succeeded by Galina Chistyakova; Heike Drechsler; Lyudmila Galkina
