= Association of Track and Field Statisticians =

International organization

The Association of Track and Field Statisticians (ATFS) was founded in 1950. It is an international organization run by volunteers whose goal is to collect and disseminate the statistics of track and field athletics.

== Foundation ==
On 26 August 1950 at the Café de la Madeleine in the Rue de la Montagne, Brussels, Belgium, whilst attending the 1950 European Athletics Championships, the Association of Track and Field Statisticians was founded.

Two of the founding members, Roberto Quercetani and Donald Potts, had published in 1948 the first study of world all-time lists, A Handbook on Olympic Games Track and Field Athletics. Readers of this book were inspired to found an international association of track statisticians. One of the founding members, the Belgian journalist André Greuze, organised the first meeting on 26 August. One of the meeting's first acts was to elect Harold Abrahams as honorary president.

== Founding members ==
- President: Roberto Quercetani (Italy)
- Secretary: Fulvio Regli (Switzerland)
- Committee: Norris McWhirter (UK), Donald Potts (USA)
- Members: Harold Abrahams (UK) - Hon. President, Bruno Bonomelli (Italy), André Greuze (Belgium), Erich Kamper (Austria), Ekkehard zur Megede (Germany), André Senay (France), Björn-Johan Weckman (Finland), Wolfgang Wünsche (Germany)

Note: two of the founders, Potts and Wünsche, were not actually present at the first meeting but are considered as founding members.

== Yearbook ==
The association has published an annual yearbook since 1951. The first edition was published in Lugano, Switzerland, titled The 1951 A.T.F.S. International Athletic Annual. The editors were Fulvio Regli and Roberto Quercetani. It is an authoritative compilation of international athletics statistics and has been known as The International Athletics Annual and The ATFS Annual. It is currently published under the title of Athletics: The International Track and Field Annual and its editor is Peter Matthews.

Previous editors and publishers
Years	Editors	Publishers
1951–52	Regli/Quercetani	Tipografia "La Commerciale" S.A., Lugano
1953–55	Regli/Quercetani	World Sports magazine, London
1956–69	Roberto Quercetani	World Sports magazine, London
1970–72	Rooney Magnusson	World Sports magazine, London
1973–74	Vladimir Visek	Bartels & Wernitz, West Berlin
1975–78	Don Potts	Track & Field News, Los Altos, California
1979–83	Nejat Kök	Palle Lassen, København
1984	Richard Hymans	Palle Lassen, København
1985–90	Peter Matthews	Sports World, London
1991–92	Peter Matthews	Burlington Publishing, London
1993–94	Peter Matthews	Harmsworth Active, London
1995–2019	Peter Matthews	SportsBooks, Worcester & Cheltenham

== Roberto Quercetani ==
Roberto Luigi Quercetani (known as RLQ to other track and field statisticians)was one of the eleven founding members of ATFS and was also its first president, remaining in the position for 18 years. He was also the editor of the first ATFS Annual. and is a renowned historian and writer on athletics

Quercetani was born in Florence, Italy on May 3, 1922. He was interested in both foreign languages and athletics from an early age, his study in both helped by reading foreign newspapers sent by friends from Switzerland. After World War II, he served as a technical interpreter for the allied forces in Italy. Now fluent in English, French and German, he started writing articles for the foreign sporting publications Leichathletik of Germany, World Sports of the UK, and Track and Field News of the United States.

In 1948, he wrote his first athletics statistical publication (with Don Potts).

From 1951, Quercetani started as a long-time contributor to the Italian newspapers La Gazzetta dello Sport and La Nazione.

In 1964 his first of many books on athletics was published: A World History of Track and Field Athletics 1864-1964. He has since added a number of titles that cover the history of most of the events of athletics.

In 1994, he was founder member, and president until 1998, of the Archivo Storico Dell'Atletica Italiana "Bruno Bonomelli", an Italian non-profit-making cultural association dedicated to the history of Italian athletics.

In 2010, under the chairmanship of Mel Watman, Quercetani was invited, as an acknowledged industry expert, to help write the book to celebrate the 2012 centenary of the governing body of athletics, the IAAF.

In 2012, in acknowledgement of his life's achievements, Quercetani was awarded by the IAAF the IAAF Veteran Pin, their most important award.

Quercetani died on May 13, 2019, at the age of 97. He was survived by his wife Maria Luisa.

== Don Potts ==
Donald H. Potts was born December 13, 1921. A degree in physics and a doctorate in mathematics led to a career in industry and academia, including being professor of mathematics at Cal State Northridge from 1965 to 1991.

A track fan from a young age, he and Roberto Quercetani compiled from 1948 the renowned annual world rankings in Track and Field News.

He was a co-founder of ATFS and of the Federation of American Statisticians of Track (with Scott Davis and Stan Eales).

He died November 1, 2001, in Santa Barbara, California.

== Executive committee members (until 2028) ==
- President: Paul Jenes (Australia)
- Vice President: Stuart Mazdon (Great Britain)
- Treasurer: Tom Casacky (United States)
- Secretary: Michael McLaughlin (Australia)
- Committee members: Giuseppe Mappa (Italy), Jose Maria Lombardo (Uruguay), Mark Wall (Australia), Ram Murali Krishnan (India)

== Awards ==
The World Athletics Heritage Plaque for (a) Legend, and (b) Culture was started in 2023. Winners were Roberto Luigi Quercetani and ATFS.

== See also ==
- List of sports history organisations
