= Al Joyner =

American track and field coach and former athlete

Personal information
- Full name: Alfrederick A. Joyner
- Born: January 19, 1960 (age 66) East St. Louis, Illinois, U.S.
- Education: Arkansas State University
- Spouse: Florence Griffith Joyner
Medal record
Men's athletics
Representing the United States
Olympic Games
Gold medal – first place	1984 Los Angeles	Triple jump

Alfrederick Joyner (born January 19, 1960) is an American track and field coach and former athlete. He was born in East St. Louis, Illinois. He is the 1984 Olympic gold medalist in the triple jump. He was also the coach and husband of the late four-time Olympic medalist Florence Griffith Joyner and is the brother of six-time Olympic medalist Jackie Joyner-Kersee.

== Career ==
A star athlete at Lincoln High School in East St. Louis, Illinois, Joyner went on to attend Arkansas State University. He competed with their track and field team throughout his college career and, by the time he graduated, Joyner was a three-time NCAA All-American indoor champion, a three-time NCAA All-American and outdoor champion, a four-time Southland Conference champ and had placed 8th in the triple jump at the World Championships in Helsinki, Finland.

Joyner was also an accomplished sprint hurdler, placing 2nd and top American in the 60 yards hurdles at the 1986 USA Indoor Track and Field Championships. He also experimented with the five-event athletics pentathlon.

In 1984 Joyner traveled to Los Angeles for the Summer Games to compete with the U.S. Olympic track and field team. With a leap of 56 feet 7.5 inches, he became the first African American in 80 years to win a gold medal in the triple jump. He was honored with the Jim Thorpe Award, which is given every four years to the best American competitor in an Olympic Field Event. That same year, he cheered his sister Jackie Joyner Kersee as she competed in the heptathlon. When she captured a silver in the event, they became the first sibling teammates in U.S. history to win medals during the same Olympics.

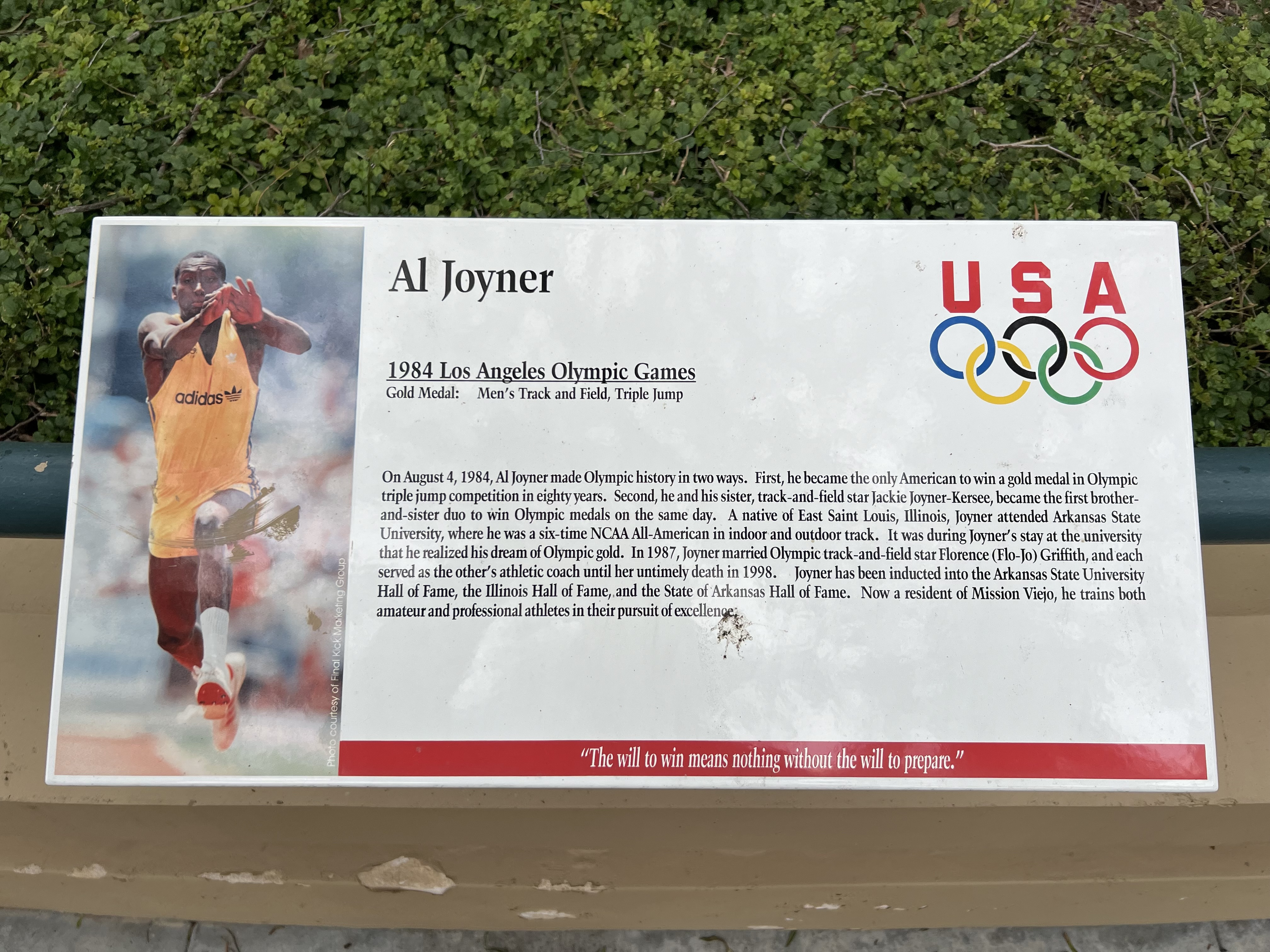
Al Joyner plaque at Florence Joyner Olympiad Park in Mission Viejo, California

On October 10, 1987, Joyner married track athlete Florence Griffith, later known as Flo–Jo. The two met in 1980 at the Olympic trials registration. He later became his wife's coach. Griffith Joyner won three gold medals at the 1988 Olympic Games. Their daughter, Mary Ruth, was born in 1990. Griffith-Joyner died from an epileptic seizure at the age of 38 in 1998. After his wife's death, Joyner began traveling to promote her newly published book, Running for Dummies, and jump-start the Florence Griffith Joyner charity/scholarship fund. He also began directing the Flo Jo Community Empowerment Foundation, an organization dedicated to making dreams come true for the youth around the world. One dollar from every sale of Running for Dummies is donated to this foundation.

Joyner has been inducted into the Arkansas State University Track and Field Hall of Fame (1993), the Arkansas Track and Field Hall of Fame (1997) and the Illinois Track and Field Hall of Fame (1999). He was hired by SportsToday.com to write columns on track and field for the 2000 Olympic games in Sydney, Australia. During this time, he also coached two athletes with their sights on the 2000 U.S. Olympic Track and Field team, and was himself training to compete in the men's triple jump trials. A knee injury prevented him from participating.

Joyner was on the University of California UCLA in Los Angeles' track and field staff as an assistant coach/women's jumps coach from 1999 to 2003. He was the sprint & jump coach for the 2005 USOC Paralympics team in Helsinki, which won 16 out of the 30 medals the USA team won. In 2005, he joined the USATF/ USOC coaching staff and became the full-time USOC high performance jump coach in 2007.

== Achievements ==
Year	Competition	Venue	Position	Notes
Representing United States
1983	World Championships	Helsinki, Finland	8th	16.76 m
1984	Olympic Games	Los Angeles, United States	1st	17.26 m
1987	World Indoor Championships	Indianapolis, United States	5th	16.92 m
