= Mark Wall =

Mark Wall may refer to:

- Mark Wall (footballer) (born 1963), Australian rules footballer
- Mark Wall (politician) (born 1970), Irish Labour Party senator
- Sir Mark Wall (judge), British High Court judge

== See also ==
- Marc M. Wall (born 1954), American diplomat
