= Ted Haydon =

American track coach (1912–1985)

Edward M. Haydon (1912–1985), was a University of Chicago track coach and founder of the University of Chicago Track Club. He was inducted into the USA Track & Field Hall of Fame and the U.S. Track & Field and Cross Country Coaches Association Hall of Fame. He coached Team USA in track at the 1961 Maccabiah Games in Israel. He was an assistant coach for the 1968 and 1972 Olympic Teams and for the 1963 and 1979 Pan American Games.

Among others, he coached Rick Wohlhuter, Willye White, Brian Oldfield, Jud Logan, Jan Johnson, Al Carius, and Lane Patterson.
