= Track & Field News =

American monthly sports magazine

- Editor: Sieg Lindstrom
- Former editors: E. Garry Hill
- Categories: Sports magazine
- Frequency: Monthly
- Publisher: Janet Vitu
- Founder: Bert Nelson and Cordner Nelson
- Founded: 1948
- Country: USA
- Based in: Mountain View, California, U.S.
- Language: English
- Website: trackandfieldnews.com
- ISSN: 0041-0284

Track & Field News is an American monthly sports magazine founded in 1948 by brothers Bert Nelson and Cordner Nelson, focused on the world of track and field.

The magazine provides coverage of athletics in the United States on the high school, national, and international levels. The magazine has given itself the motto of "The Bible of the Sport".

Sieg Lindstrom is the magazine's editor and Jeff Hollobaugh is the managing editor. E. Garry Hill is editor emeritus. Janet Vitu is publisher and Ed Fox is publisher emeritus.

Each year, the magazine produces world and US rankings of top track & field athletes, selected by the magazine's editors along with an international team of experts. The team changes year to year, for the 2012 season (published in the February 2013 issue) the world rankings compilers consisted of Jonathan Berenbom, Richard Hymans, Dave Johnson, Nejat Kok, and R. L. Quercentani.

Many of the standard abbreviations used throughout the sport, like WR=World Record; WJR=World Junior Record; AR=American Record, started as print saving abbreviations in the magazine.

Track & Field News switched to a digital-only format during 2018, but resumed its paper and ink publication in January 2019.

Since 1954, Track & Field News also publishes (subscription required) eTrack Newsletter (formerly Track Newsletter). The newsletter provides additional track and field meet results and lists.

Since 1952 (beginning with the Summer Olympics in Helsinki, Finland), Track & Field News has also operated Track & Field News Tours, taking fans of the sport around the world to major competitions.

== See also ==
- Track & Field News Athlete of the Year
