= The Hills: New Beginnings =

American reality television series

- Genre: Reality television
- Starring: Brody Jenner; Audrina Patridge; Heidi Montag; Spencer Pratt; Justin Brescia; Stephanie Pratt; Frankie Delgado; Whitney Port; Mischa Barton; Brandon Thomas Lee; Jason Wahler; Ashley Wahler; Kaitlynn Carter
- Theme music composer: Natasha Bedingfield; Danielle Brisebois; Wayne Rodrigues
- Opening theme: "Unwritten (The 2019 Remix)" by Natasha Bedingfield
- Country of origin: United States
- Original language: English
- No. of seasons: 2
- No. of episodes: 24

Production
- Executive producers: Douglas Ross; Alex Baskin; Tina Gazzerro Clapp; Lauren Weber; Adam DiVello; Megan Estrada; Jim Fraenkel; Sandi Johnson; Toni Gallagher; Robert Carroll; Cecily Deutsch; Brent Gauches
- Production locations: Los Angeles, California
- Cinematography: Jason Eksuzian
- Camera setup: Multi-Camera
- Running time: 44–46 minutes
- Production companies: Evolution Media; MTV Entertainment Studios (2021)

Original release
- Network: MTV
- Release: June 24, 2019 – August 4, 2021

Related
- The Hills

The Hills: New Beginnings is an American reality television show, developed as a sequel to The Hills. The series documents the original cast members as they navigate from the carefree days of their 20s to the more complicated reality of life in their mid-30s while still living in Los Angeles. The series was canceled after two seasons in January 2022.

== Production ==
=== Development ===
The Hills is an American reality television series that aired for six seasons on MTV from May 31, 2006, until July 13, 2010. Developed as a spin-off of Laguna Beach: The Real Orange County, the series aired six seasons and focused on the personal and professional lives of several young men and women residing in Los Angeles, California. Its premise was conceived by Adam DiVello, while Liz Gateley and Sean Travis served as executive producers. On August 20, 2018, at the 2018 MTV Video Music Awards, MTV announced a revival of the series entitled The Hills: New Beginnings, set to air in 2019. On April 2, 2019, it was announced that the series was set to premiere on June 24, 2019.

On July 22, 2019, due to high viewership and ratings, the series was renewed for a second season which premiered on May 12, 2021. Production began in early 2020, with only a few episodes completed filming before being halted in March due to the COVID-19 pandemic. The plan was to resume mid-late summer, with MTV at one point even considering filming in a quarantine bubble. The network ultimately chose against this, and normal production resumed in November 2020 with strict COVID-19 safety protocols in place after California began to lifts its lockdowns. However, due to long delay of season 2, the series received low ratings. On January 18, 2022, MTV canceled the series after two seasons.

=== Casting ===
Original cast members Heidi Montag, Spencer Pratt, Stephanie Pratt, Audrina Patridge, Whitney Port, Jason Wahler, Frankie Delgado and Brody Jenner were all set to return. It was revealed by People that Lauren Conrad, the original star of The Hills, would not return for the revival. Us Weekly confirmed that Kristin Cavallari, who replaced Conrad as star of The Hills in season six, and Lo Bosworth, who was a main cast member for season six, would also not return. Us Weekly also reported that Cory in the House star Kyle Massey would have been part of the cast, as well as two bloggers, however, this did not eventuate. Kathy Hilton revealed daughters Paris Hilton, Nicky Hilton and son Barron Hilton II were asked to join but declined. Stephen Coletti also revealed he declined MTV's offer to appear on the series. On October 3, 2018, it was reported that actress Mischa Barton would be joining the cast. Barton starred in the Fox television series The O.C., which inspired the creation of Laguna Beach. Other new cast members included Kaitlynn Carter, Jennifer Delgado and Ashley Wahler, the wives of Jenner, Frankie Delgado and Jason Wahler, respectively. On October 15, 2018, it was confirmed that Brandon Thomas Lee, son of Pamela Anderson and Tommy Lee, would be joining the cast.

In March 2020, Cavallari announced that she was set to appear as a guest star on the second season. In late 2020, it was announced that socialite Caroline D'Amore joined the cast of the second season, while Stephanie Pratt and Mischa Barton left the series.

== Cast ==
=== Main cast ===
- Brody Jenner
- Audrina Patridge
- Heidi Montag
- Spencer Pratt
- Justin Brescia
- Stephanie Pratt (season 1)
- Frankie Delgado
- Whitney Port (season 1; recurring season 2)
- Mischa Barton (season 1)
- Brandon Thomas Lee (season 1)
- Jason Wahler (season 2; recurring season 1)
- Ashley Wahler (season 2; recurring season 1)
- Kaitlynn Carter (season 2; recurring season 1)

=== Supporting cast ===
- Jennifer Delgado
- Caroline D'Amore (season 2)

=== Guest stars ===
- Pamela Anderson (season 1)
- Perez Hilton (season 1)
- Linda Thompson
- Brandon Jenner (season 1)
- Ryan Cabrera (season 1)
- Kristin Cavallari (season 2)

== Episodes ==
=== Series overview ===
Season	Episodes	Originally released	
Season	Episodes	First released	Last released
1	12	June 24, 2019	September 9, 2019
2	12	May 12, 2021	August 4, 2021

=== Season 1 (2019) ===
No. overall	No. in season	Title	Original release date	U.S. viewers (millions)
1	1	"I Don't Hold Grudges... JK!"	June 24, 2019	0.65
Audrina moves back to Los Angeles and reunites with Whitney and Heidi, they talk about motherhood and Audrina reveals to them that Justin has reached out to her since her divorce. Stephanie also moves back from London hoping to repair her relationship with her brother, Spencer. Frankie organizes a party for Stephanie's homecoming and the whole cast is invited.
2	2	"You're Not My Family"	July 1, 2019	0.59
At the party, Mischa confronts Perez Hilton about past online bullying. Meanwhile, Stephanie confronts both Spencer and Heidi, but it does not end well. Stephanie thinks Heidi is manipulating her brother, while Spencer thinks Stephanie is too self centered. Brandon invites Brody and Frankie to his new house and opens up to them about his struggles with alcohol abuse. Audrina still likes Justin, but she is afraid he is unreliable.
3	3	"A Legend in His Own Mind"	July 8, 2019	0.54
Spencer feels that Brody has changed since marrying Kaitlynn and that she is one of the reasons why they are not as close as they once were and the two have a heated discussion during Justin's concert. Audrina finds out that Justin and Stephanie are closer than she thought.
4	4	"Not to Eavesdrop, but to Eavesdrop"	July 15, 2019	0.57
Brody throws a party for his band's record release, he invites Spencer but he does not show up. Heidi and Spencer organize an event for their healing crystals brand, Stephanie shows up and the two siblings hope they can finally be civil with each other. During the event, Audrina tries to clarify the rumors with Justin, but her friend Joey thinks both he and Stephanie are shady and untrustworthy.
5	5	"Playing with Fire"	July 22, 2019	0.45
Brody and Kaitlynn are supposed to travel to Las Vegas with their friends, but they are surprised by a wildfire and Brody decides to stay in Malibu to protect their property. Stephanie, Justin, Frankie, Audrina and Mischa are already in Las Vegas and try to enjoy their stay, until Stephanie confronts Audrina about what Joey said during Heidi and Spencer's event. Stephanie gets really defensive, but Justin does not even try to debunk the rumors and this makes Mischa suspicious.
6	6	"I Don't Think We Can Be Friends"	July 29, 2019	0.43
Heidi contemplates the idea of releasing new music and starts collaborating with Justin. Audrina and Joey meet Stephanie and try to squash the rumors, but it does not end well. Frankie invites everyone over for a dinner party but Audrina does not feel like going because she is afraid Justin and Stephanie would cause drama. Afterwards, Audrina and Justin meet in a restaurant hoping to move on, but they quickly realize they are probably not going to be able to remain friends.
7	7	"You're Enemy #1"	August 5, 2019	0.39
Heidi and Spencer invite Stephanie over for Thanksgiving; all three of them are nervous but it all goes well and Stephanie talks about a fight she had with Brody. They later join the others at Frankie's house, where Justin brings his new girlfriend. Stephanie thinks this is proof the rumors about her and Justin were completely false and demands an apology from Audrina, but she denies her request.
8	8	"Are We Exclusive?"	August 12, 2019	0.58
After Justin, Audrina reconnects with another one of her ex-boyfriends, Ryan Cabrera. Heidi and Spencer's ten years anniversary is coming up and they decide to celebrate with a fancy dinner on a yacht, Heidi tells Spencer she is ready for another baby, but he does not think it is the right time for them since they are focusing on their marriage and their careers. Jason reveals to Spencer he has had a relapse with alcoholism, but he and Ashley are trying to keep things under control and attend Kaitlynn's party. Things between Brandon and his date start getting serious.
9	9	"This Hangover Better Be Expensive"	August 19, 2019	0.48
Heidi and Spencer start planning their vow renewal. Heidi is particularly excited for her bachelorette party since she didn't have one before getting married. Stephanie sees the party as an occasion for her and Heidi to become closer, but she is also nervous because Audrina is going to be there. After the party, the two end up having a heated discussion.
10	10	"Brody Gets Away With So Much"	September 2, 2019	0.41
Brody apologizes to Stephanie, hoping to make amends with both her and Spencer. Audrina throws an event for her swimwear collection, while Kaitlynn is frustrated to hear people talking about her marriage.
11	11	"Of Course We're Married"	September 9, 2019	0.35
Brandon reconnects with his father, but it leads to a break-up between him and his girlfriend. Whitney opens up to Kaitlynn about suffering a miscarriage and the feeling of guilt that came with it. The group reunites before Heidi and Spencer's vow renewal, but Kaitlynn starts feeling uncomfortable after overhearing Ashley Wahler and Jennifer Delgado talking about her and Brody.
12	12	"I Hope You Say I Do"	September 9, 2019	0.36
Heidi introduces her choreographer to Brandon and the two end up hooking up. Audrina and Justin make amends and decide to start fresh and leave their drama behind. After the ceremony, Heidi performs her latest single, "Glitter and Glory", in front of her friends and family.

=== Season 2 (2021) ===
No. overall	No. in season	Title	Original release date	U.S. viewers (millions)
13	1	"Burying the Past"	May 12, 2021	0.39
14	2	"Best Friends Kissing"	May 19, 2021	N/A
15	3	"The Last Hurrah"	May 26, 2021	N/A
16	4	"Who's a Better Kisser"	June 2, 2021	N/A
17	5	"You Told Her?!"	June 16, 2021	0.31
18	6	"I'm Back in LA Bitches!"	June 23, 2021	0.27
19	7	"Who Slept at Your House?"	June 30, 2021	0.34
20	8	"Get Dessert and Bail"	July 7, 2021	0.37
21	9	"Time Heals Not Some Things"	July 14, 2021	0.29
22	10	"That's Math Right There"	July 21, 2021	0.32
23	11	"What About Me?"	July 28, 2021	N/A
24	12	"Timing Is Everything"	August 4, 2021	0.18

=== Specials ===
Title	Original release date	U.S. viewers (millions)
"Shadiest Moments Ever"	June 19, 2019	0.18
"What You Missed"	July 25, 2019	0.28

== Reception ==
On review aggregator Rotten Tomatoes, the series holds an approval rating of 45% based on 11 reviews, with an average rating of 4/10. The website's critical consensus reads, "For a show called New Beginnings, The Hills is unfortunately stuck in its old ways—though for fans looking to catch up with their favorite characters there is plenty of drama to dive back into." On Metacritic, it has a weighted average score of 27 out of 100, based on 4 critics, indicating "generally unfavorable reviews".
