= The Princes of Malibu =

- Genre: Reality television
- Created by: Brody Jenner; Brandon Jenner; Brant Pinvidic; Spencer Pratt
- Starring: Brody Jenner; Brandon Jenner; Linda Thompson; David Foster
- Opening theme: "Free Ride"
- Country of origin: United States
- Original language: English
- No. of seasons: 1
- No. of episodes: 6

Production
- Executive producers: Gary R. Benz; Brant Pinvidic; Spencer Pratt
- Production locations: Malibu, California
- Running time: 22 minutes
- Production company: GRB Entertainment

Original release
- Network: Fox
- Release: July 10 – August 21, 2005

The Princes of Malibu is an American reality television series which premiered on Fox on July 10, 2005. There were six episodes broadcast; the first two aired on Fox, and the remaining four aired on Fox Reality Channel. It starred Brody Jenner and Brandon Jenner.

== Synopsis ==
The series followed Brandon and Brody Jenner, the adult sons of Olympic champion Caitlyn Jenner and former Miss Tennessee USA Linda Thompson. On permanent vacation, the brothers lived with Linda and her husband, David Foster, in Foster's Malibu estate. Linda spoiled the boys, treated them as though they could do no wrong, while Foster wanted the "freeloaders" to get jobs and straighten their lives out. With their friend Spencer Pratt, the boys got themselves into various hijinks.

== Episodes ==
1. Episode One (July 10, 2005)
2. Episode Two (July 17, 2005)
3. Episode Three (July 24, 2005)
4. Episode Four (July 31, 2005)
5. Episode Five (August 7, 2005)
6. Episode Six (August 21, 2005)

== Production ==
The future of the series was thrown into doubt on July 11, 2005, when Thompson filed for divorce from Foster the day after the show premiered. Fox canceled the series after airing only two episodes. The remaining episodes were aired on Fox Reality Channel. It has since been featured on Channel V Australia, Living2 in the UK, and MuchMoreMusic in Canada. The Princes of Malibu: The Complete Series was released on DVD on July 29, 2008.

On December 20, 2016, GRB Entertainment made the show available for streaming on YouTube.

Brody Jenner and Pratt became regulars on MTV's The Hills. In 2009, Jenner starred in his own reality show, Bromance. Brody and Brandon occasionally appeared on their once-stepmother Kris Jenner's reality show, Keeping Up with the Kardashians.
