= Caroline D'Amore =

American businesswoman, DJ, actress and model

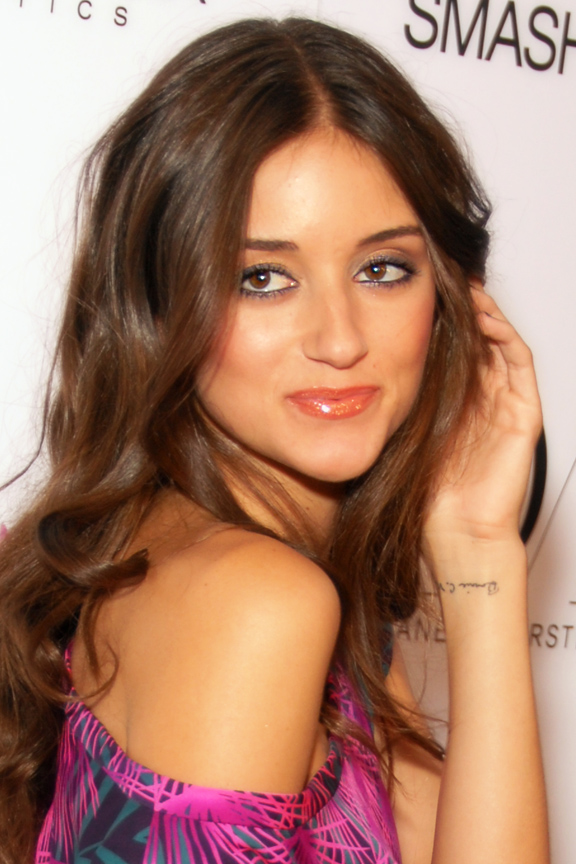
- D'Amore in 2009
- Born: June 9, 1984 (age 42); Los Angeles, California
- Education: Malibu High School
- Occupations: Businesswoman; DJ; actress; model; television personality; fashion designer
- Years active: 2002–present
- Known for: Gordon Ramsay's Food Stars; The Hills: New Beginnings
- Spouse(s): Bobby Alt (m. 2012, div. ?); Omer Levy (m. 2024)
- Children: 2
- Website: pizzagirl.com

Caroline D'Amore (born June 9, 1984) is an American businesswoman, DJ, actress, and fashion model. She is the founder and CEO of Pizza Girl, Inc. She and her family own D'Amores Pizza, founded by her father. D'Amore was placed as a runner-up in Fox's competition series Gordon Ramsay's Food Stars (2023).

She began her career as a fashion model, working for Diane von Fürstenberg, Heatherette, Agent Provocateur and Stella McCartney. She has since played small roles in Hollywood films and television series, held her own summer residency at the Hard Rock Hotel in Las Vegas and recorded a line of standalone singles with Republic Records. She appeared on the second season of MTV's reality television series The Hills: New Beginnings (2021).

== Early life ==
Caroline D'Amore was born on June 9, 1984, in Los Angeles, California, to restaurateur Joe D'Amore and Bonnie Major. She has three sisters. Her parents are the founders of D'Amore's Pizza Connection. "I grew up catering and going to all the movie sets with my dad and helping [because] my mom passed away when I was five. So I had no choice a lot of nights to just go with dad and learn how to cater and help out with the business. So that's kind of where my entrepreneurial food industry business side started," she told Forbes in 2021.

D'Amore's mother died of AIDS when she was five, and she was raised by her father. Her mother contracted the virus at a hospital, when she was given a precautionary blood transfusion without checking the blood they gave her. D'Amore and her sister, Christie participate in AIDS Walk every year in honor of their mother.

D'Amore studied ballet and jazz and performed in local productions of Annie and A Chorus Line. She attended Malibu High School alongside her The Hills: New Beginnings co-star Brody Jenner. However, she dropped out of high school after completing her freshman year, saying: "School wasn’t for me. Honestly, I felt uncomfortable and I didn’t have a clique."

== Career ==
=== Modeling and fashion design ===
At 17, she moved to New York City for one year to work as a fashion model, appearing on the magazine cover of Teen Vogue and walking the runway for Diane von Fürstenberg. Her clothing line, a collection of tank tops called H. Starlet was launched in 2003. She appeared in advertisements for J.Crew, Pellegrino water and Deere Colhoun handbags. D'Amore walked the runway for numerous brands, including Day By Day, Jenny Han, Ashley Paige, Odd Molly, Heatherette, Agent Provocateur, Stella McCartney, Jaime Pressly's J'aime line, Christian Audigier and Alvin Valley. D'Amore has modeled for numerous magazines, including Forbes, Santa Barbara Magazine, Seventeen, CosmoGirl and Teen. She has graced the magazine covers of Flaunt, Nylon, LaPalme, Trustworthy and Food & Beverage.

She launched a swimwear collection, D'Amore by Marceau, which debuted at Los Angeles Fashion Week in October 2008. Kim and Kourtney Kardashian were front row guests at her fashion show and the sisters complimented D'Amore's collection, Kourtney saying: "I like her suits too because they look good on all body types. I also wear her one-pieces with shorts, with high-waisted jeans—you don't have to wear it just as a swimsuit". In September 2019, she walked the runway for Kyle Richards' and Shahida Clayton's new clothing brand at New York Fashion Week, which was documented on the reality show The Real Housewives of Beverly Hills.

=== Music ===
D'Amore made her musical debut in West Hollywood clubs, where she met DJ Skee, who signed her to host the EDM radio show on Skee 24/7 called Heartbeatz. She was featured as an artist-in-residence at the Hard Rock Hotel in Las Vegas, worked as a DJ at all of Paris Hilton's record release parties around the world and released her debut single titled "Kill the Clock." She stayed in Beijing for over a month and worked as a DJ at the 2008 Summer Olympics parties. She performed as an opening act for will.i.am at the 2009 MTV Music Awards in Japan. In 2013, D'Amore produced and hosted Billboard's web series, DJ Diaries With Caroline D'Amore, which explores the lives of famous DJs, including Steve Aoki, Afrojack and The Crystal Method.

She has released several singles, including "Music Man and "Global Warming" with Swedish DJ and producer StoneBridge. "Music Man" was produced by D'Amore and StoneBridge and it peaked at number one on the Beatport Charts. She was signed to Casablanca Records and her first official release through Casablanca was a cover of Crystal Waters’ "Gypsy Woman", which she recorded with Dutch singer Natalie La Rose. In 2018, she was an opening act for Diplo at Sundance Film Festival, performed a Today show residency and worked as a DJ at one of Coachella's parties. In March 2019, D'amore was hired to DJ alongside Ireland Baldwin for Norah restaurant's third anniversary in West Hollywood.

=== Films and television ===
D'Amore and Kim Kardashian were developing a reality television show together before Kardashian signed on to star on Keeping Up with the Kardashians. D'Amore appeared on the second season of Keeping Up with the Kardashians and its spin-off series Kourtney & Khloe Take Miami. She portrayed Brooke on the fifth season of HBO series Entourage, in the episode "Unlike a Virgin" and played Rachel in the drama film Daydreamer (2007) alongside Aaron Paul and Arielle Kebbel. She has also appeared on The Clinic, 90210 and America's Next Top Model. She played Maggie, younger sister of Audrina Patridge's character Megan, in the 2009 horror film Sorority Row and subsequently appeared in the music video for the promotional track "Get U Home" by Shwayze. Sorority Row was released theatrically in the United States on September 11, 2009, and grossed $27.2 million worldwide on a budget of $12.5 million. She played Adriana in the 2009 comedy film Frat Party. In 2011, she appeared in an episode of MTV’s My Super Sweet World Class, where she is seen planning a party, shopping designer clothes and partying at a club. She was featured as a music expert on E! New Year's special Sounding Off: The 2013 Year In Music, alongside Christina Milian, Pauly D and Sebastian Bach.

In 2014, she appeared as the DJ in the music video for Jessie J, Ariana Grande and Nicki Minaj's song "Bang Bang". D'Amore joined the second season of reality television series The Hills: New Beginnings, while Stephanie Pratt and Mischa Barton left the series. She had a role as L'Amour in the drama film, Habit (2021) starring Bella Thorne and Paris Jackson. The film was released on August 20, 2021, by Lionsgate. In 2022, she appeared on the 12th episode of the first season of Paris in Love as Paris Hilton's childhood friend.

In April 2023, D'Amore announced via Instagram that she is competing on Fox's new series, Gordon Ramsay's Food Stars, which premiered on May 24, 2023. She was one of 15 contestants competing for Ramsay's $250,000 investment. She made her way to the finale with two other contestants, with Chris Kanik announced as the winner on July 16, 2023.

=== Restaurants and food industry ===
D’Amore and her ex-husband established their own D'Amore's Pizza location in Los Angeles, but she lost it in the divorce. She has also launched D'Amore's food truck and D’Amore's catering company. The catering company has worked at several high-profile events, including Jessica Alba's The Honest Company's party and Seth Rogen's Hilarity for Charity event at the Hollywood Palladium. In March 2018, D'Amore and her father appeared in an episode of Hallmark Channel's morning talk show Home & Family, and cooked their famous pizza.

She is the founder of her own line of organic, all-natural pasta sauces titled Pizza Girl. Pizza Girl sauces were sold at over 100 supermarkets before the COVID-19 pandemic. She re-launched the brand and Pizza Girl is available online and all of the Gelson grocery stores in California as of May 2021.

== Public image ==
D'Amore first gained media attention as a Los Angeles “It girl," when she became a notable fixture in the late-night circuit and was often seen attending events with socialite Paris Hilton. By mid-2000s, D'Amore had developed a reputation as a socialite, and was hailed as "modelling sensation, socialite and Paris Hilton gal pal" by British Vogue. In 2007, People magazine called her "a fixture on L.A. couture runways and the Young Hollywood party scene." "Hilton’s pal Caroline D’Amore also sashayed the runway with her, as front-row pals Brandon Davis and Elisha Cuthbert cheered them on," People wrote about 2B Free fashion show on March 21, 2007. In October 2007, she was profiled in the Los Angeles Times. Adam Tschorn of Los Angeles Times wrote that "If Los Angeles fashion week has one face, it might belong to Caroline D’Amore. Over the course of her career, the 23-year-old has walked hundreds of runway shows in this town – sometimes up to 14 a week –and left an impression that’s hard to ignore."

D'Amore was often photographed with fellow socialites Kim and Kourtney Kardashian, Kimberly Stewart, Nicole Richie and Nicky Hilton. "Going out in LA, I don't have to wait in line or anything like that. I don't remember the last time I did that. It's definitely the VIP lifestyle. Drinks are often on the house and I've lived a fabulous life so far," she said in an episode of MTV's reality show My Super Sweet World Class in 2011. During this period she continued working as a fashion model and had roles in multiple television series. In the 2010s, she focused on D'Amore's Pizza, catering business and her pasta sauces line.

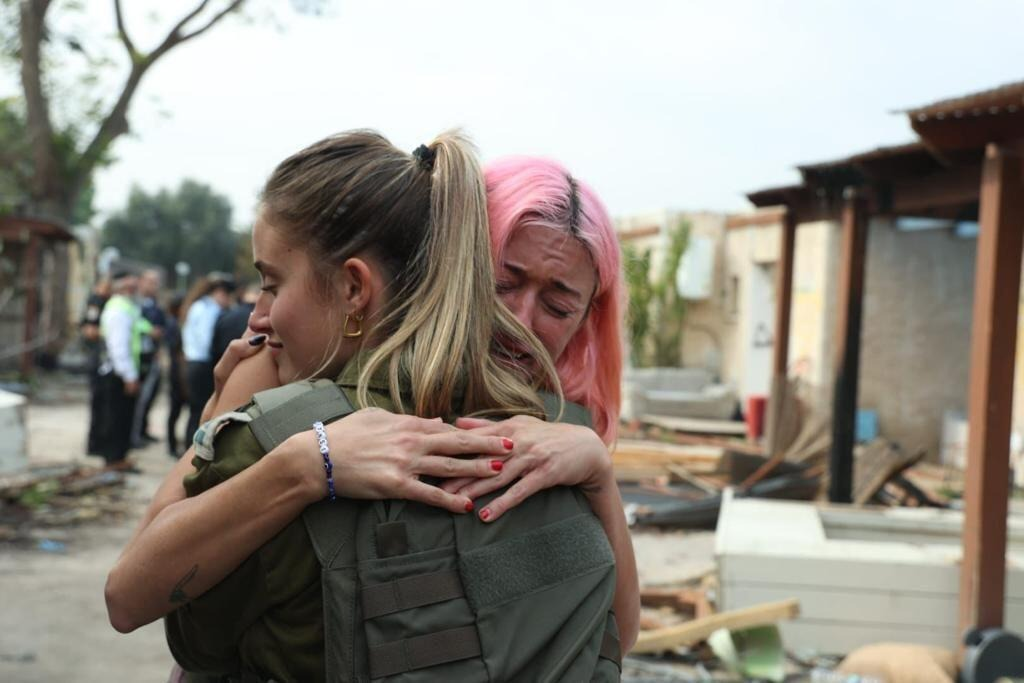
Caroline D'Amore visiting Kfar Aza after the 2023 Hamas-led attack on Israel, November 2023

== Activism ==
D'Amore visited Kfar Aza after the 2023 Hamas-led attack on Israel in November 2023. She has shared posts and videos on social media in support of the Jewish community, saying, "If you’re one of these people ripping off posters and spewing hate, you need to take a really good look at yourself and ask yourself, why would you ever do that? Free the Palestinians does not mean torture Jewish people."

== Personal life ==
She married punk band Street Drum Corps' singer Bobby Alt in Malibu on August 5, 2012, but the couple has since divorced. The couple have a daughter, Isabella Viking Alt (b. 2015). D'Amore walked the runway holding her daughter at the Shahida Parides Fall/Winter 2017 Collection show at Pacific Design Center in 2017.

D'Amore married Omer Levy on August 24, 2024. She gave birth to a daughter, Olive D’Amore Levy, in December 2025.

== Filmography ==
=== Film ===
Year	Title	Role	Notes
2004	Ghost Game	Rachel	
2007	Daydreamer	Rachel	
2008	Perfectly Flawed	Mad Woman	Short film
2009	Sorority Row	Maggie Blaire	
2009	Frat Party	Adriana	
2010	Pizza with Bullets	Lisa Tortellini	
2010	Rollers	Tatum	
2013	American Idiots	Katie Jones	
2021	Habit	L'Amour	
2022	Audition	N/A	Short film

=== Television ===
Year	Title	Role	Notes
2005	Style Star	Herself / Host	Episode: "Los Angeles Fashion Week"
2007	Bad Dad	Wife	Episode: "Womanizing Daddy"
2008	Entourage	Brooke	Episode: "Unlike a Virgin"
2008	90210	DJ	Episode: "We're Not in Kansas Anymore"
2009	Kourtney and Khloe Take Miami	Herself	Episode: "Models Don't Skateboard"
2009	Cubed	Herself	Episode: "#1.1"
2010	The Clinic	Beth	Recurring role; 5 episodes
2011	MTV’s My Super Sweet World Class	Herself	Episode: "#1.3"
2013	Sounding Off: The 2013 Year In Music	Herself / Music Expert	Television special
2013	America's Next Top Model	Herself / DJ	Episode: "The Girl Who Went Around in Circles"
2018	Today Show	Herself / DJ	
2020	The Real Housewives of Beverly Hills	Herself / Model	Episode: "The Crown Isn't So Heavy" (uncredited)
2021	The Hills: New Beginnings	Herself	12 episodes; Recurring cast (season 2)
2022	Paris in Love	Herself	2 episodes
2023	Gordon Ramsay's Food Stars	Herself	Contestant; 10 episodes
2025	Broken Dreams	Caroline D'Amore	Unknown episodes

=== Music videos ===
Year	Title	Artist(s)
2009	"Get U Home"	Shwayze
2014	"Bang Bang"	Jessie J, Ariana Grande and Nicki Minaj

== Discography ==
Singles
Year	Title	Featured artist(s)
2013	"Kill the Clock"	Holevar, Matt Aubrey
2013	"Music Man"	StoneBridge
2014	"Global Warming"	StoneBridge
2015	"Come to California"	National Anthem
2015	"Gypsy Woman"	Natalie La Rose
2017	"Love Somebody"	Ayah Marar

== Awards and nominations ==
Year	Association	Category	Work	Result
2010	New York International Film and TV Festival	Gold Medal for Crime Short (shared with Romeo Antonio)	Rollers	Won
