= Caitlyn Jenner =

American media personality and decathlete (born 1949)

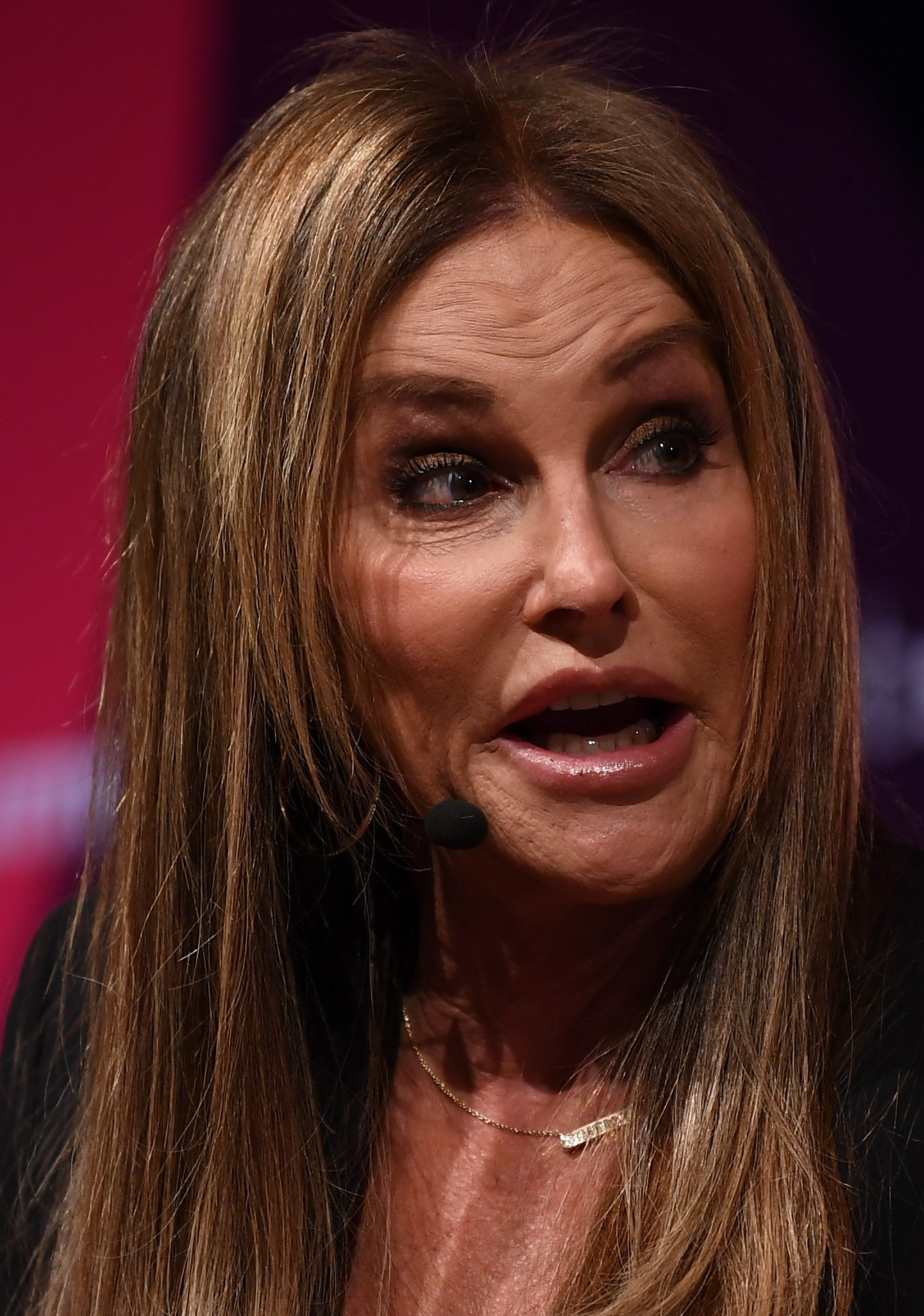
- Jenner in 2017
- Born: William Bruce Jenner; October 28, 1949 (age 77); Mount Kisco, New York, U.S.
- Other name: Caitlyn Marie Jenner
- Education: Graceland College (BS)
- Occupations: Media personality; athlete
- Years active: 1970–present
- Television: Keeping Up with the Kardashians (2007–2021); I Am Cait (2015–2016)
- Political party: Republican
- Spouses: Chrystie Crownover (m. 1972; div. 1981); Linda Thompson (m. 1981; div. 1986); Kris Kardashian (m. 1991; div. 2015)
- Children: 6, including: Burt; Brandon; Brody; Kendall; Kylie
- Family: Kardashian family (by marriage)
- Sports career
- Country: United States
- Sport: Track and field; auto racing
- Event: Decathlon
- College team: Graceland Yellowjackets
- Coached by: L. D. Weldon; Bert Bonanno
Medal record
Men's athletics
Representing the United States
Olympic Games
| Gold medal – first place | 1976 Montreal | Decathlon |
Pan American Games
| Gold medal – first place | 1975 Mexico City | Decathlon |
- Website: Official website

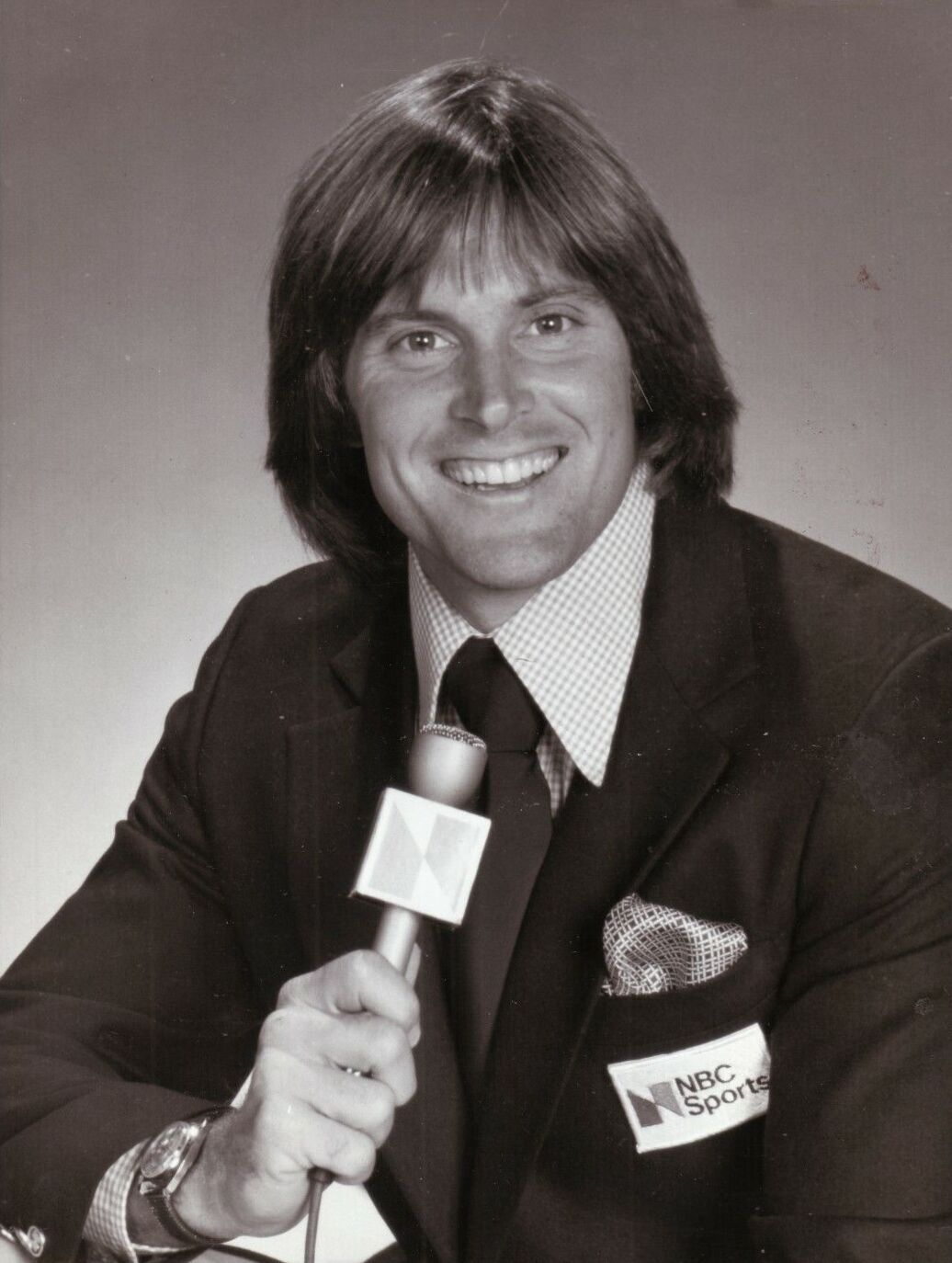
Jenner in 1980

Caitlyn Marie Jenner (born William Bruce Jenner; October 28, 1949) is an American media personality and retired Olympic gold medal-winning decathlete.

Jenner played college football for the Graceland Yellowjackets before incurring a knee injury that required surgery. Convinced by Olympic decathlete Jack Parker's coach, L. D. Weldon, to try the decathlon, she competed in decathlon for six years, culminating in winning the men's decathlon event at the 1976 Summer Olympics in Montreal, setting a third successive world record and gaining fame as "an all-American hero". Jenner established a career in television, film, writing, auto racing, business, and as a Playgirl cover model.

Jenner has six children with three successive wives – Chrystie Crownover, Linda Thompson, and Kris Jenner – and from 2007 to 2021 appeared on the reality television series Keeping Up with the Kardashians with Kris, their daughters Kendall and Kylie Jenner, and stepchildren Kourtney, Kim, Khloé, and Rob Kardashian.

Jenner publicly came out as transgender in April 2015, announcing her new name in July of that year. From 2015 to 2016, she starred in the reality television series I Am Cait, which focused on her gender transition. At the time of her coming out, she had been called the most famous transgender woman in the world. Jenner is a transgender rights activist, although her views on transgender issues have been criticized by many other LGBTQ+ activists.

A member of the Republican Party, Jenner ran in the 2021 California gubernatorial recall election, finishing 13th with one percent of the vote. Six months after the election, Jenner was hired by Fox News as an on-air contributor.

== Early life ==
Caitlyn Marie Jenner was born on October 28, 1949, in Mount Kisco, New York, as William Bruce Jenner, and was known as Bruce until June 2015. Her parents are Esther Ruth (née McGuire) and William Hugh Jenner, who was an arborist originally from New Brunswick, Canada. She is of English, Scottish, Irish, Dutch, and Welsh descent. Jenner's younger brother, Burt, was killed in a car accident in Canton, Connecticut, on November 30, 1976, shortly after Jenner's success at the Olympic Games. As a child, Jenner was diagnosed with dyslexia.

=== Education ===
Jenner attended Sleepy Hollow High School in Sleepy Hollow, New York, for freshman and sophomore year and Newtown High School in Newtown, Connecticut, for junior and senior years, graduating in 1968. Jenner earned a football athletic scholarship and attended Graceland College in Lamoni, Iowa, but was forced to stop playing football because of a knee injury. Recognizing Jenner's potential, Graceland track coach L. D. Weldon encouraged Jenner to switch to the decathlon. Jenner debuted as a decathlete in 1970 in the Drake Relays decathlon in Des Moines, Iowa, finishing in fifth place. Jenner graduated from Graceland College in 1973 with a degree in physical education.

== Decathlon career ==
=== Early career ===
At the 1972 U.S. Olympic Trials at Hayward Field in Eugene, Oregon, Jenner was eleventh after the first day in the men's decathlon and climbed to fifth behind Steve Gough and Andrew Pettes, with one event remaining on the Fourth of July. Needing to make up a 19-second gap on Gough in the 1500 meters, Jenner qualified for the Olympic team by finishing first, 22 seconds ahead of the others. This prompted the Eugene Register-Guard to ask, "Who's Jenner?" Following the trials, Jenner was tenth in the decathlon at the 1972 Summer Olympics in Munich, West Germany. By watching Soviet Mykola Avilov win the event, Jenner was inspired to start an intense training regimen. "For the first time, I knew what I wanted out of life and that was it, and this guy has it. I literally started training that night at midnight, running through the streets of Munich, Germany, training for the Games. I trained that day on through the 1976 Games, 6–8 hours a day, every day, 365 days a year."

After graduating from Graceland, Jenner married girlfriend Chrystie Crownover and moved to San Jose, California. Crownover provided most of the family income as a flight attendant for United Airlines. Jenner trained during the day and sold insurance at night, earning US$9,000 a year. In the era before professional athletes were allowed to compete in Olympic sports, this kind of training was unheard-of. On the other hand, Soviet athletes were state sponsored, which gave them an advantage over amateur American athletes. During this period, Jenner trained at the San Jose City College (SJCC) and San Jose State University (SJSU) tracks. San Jose athletics centered on SJCC coach Bert Bonanno; at that time, the city was a hotbed for training and was called the "Track Capital of the World". Many other aspiring Olympic athletes also trained at San Jose; the list included Millard Hampton, Andre Phillips, John Powell, Mac Wilkins, and Al Feuerbach. Jenner's best events were on day two of the decathlon: hurdles, discus, pole vault, javelin, and 1500 meters.

=== Olympic success ===
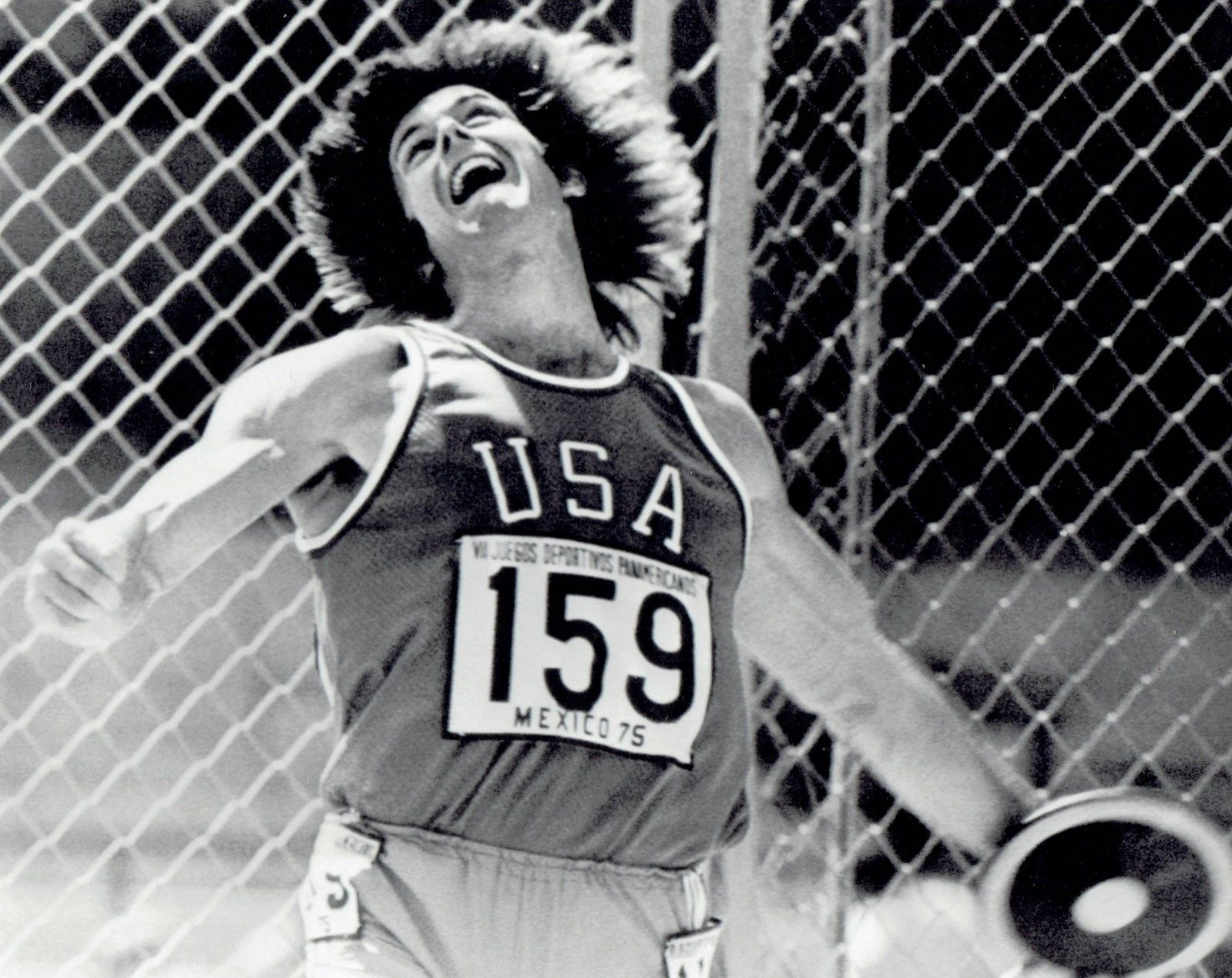
Jenner at the 1975 Pan American Games

Jenner was the American champion in the men's decathlon event in 1974 and was featured on the cover of Track & Field News magazine's August 1974 issue. While on tour in 1975, Jenner won the French national championship and a gold medal at the 1975 Pan American Games, setting the tournament record with 8,045 points. This was followed by world records of 8,524 points at the U.S.A./U.S.S.R./Poland triangular meet in Eugene, Oregon, on August 9–10, 1975, breaking Avilov's record, and 8,538 points at the 1976 Olympic trials, also in Eugene. The second Eugene record was a hybrid score because of a timing system failure and because it was wind aided. Still, Jenner was proud of what she described as "a nice little workout."

We got what we wanted. We scared the hell out of everybody in the world only a month away from the Games.

Of the 13 decathlons Jenner competed from 1973 to 1976, the only loss was at the 1975 AAU National Championships, when a "no height" in the pole vault marred the score.

At the 1976 Olympic Games in Montreal, Jenner achieved personal bests in all five events on the first day of the men's decathlon – a "home run" – despite being in second place behind Guido Kratschmer of West Germany. Jenner was confident: "The second day has all my good events. If everything works out all right, we should be ahead after it's all over." Following a rainstorm on the second day, Jenner watched teammate Fred Dixon get injured in the 110 meter hurdles and so adopted a cautious approach to the hurdles and discus. Jenner then had personal bests in the pole vault and javelin. At that point, victory was virtually ensured, and it remained to be seen by how much Jenner would improve the record. In the final event – the 1500 meters, which was broadcast live on national television – Jenner looked content to finish the long competition. Jenner sprinted the last lap, making up a 50-meter deficit and nearly catching the event favorite, Soviet Leonid Litvinenko, who was already well out of contention for the gold medal and whose personal best had been eight seconds better than Jenner's personal best before the race. Jenner set a new personal best time and won the gold medal with a world-record score of 8,618 points.

Olympic world record performance:

| 100m (wind) | Long jump (wind) | Shot put | High jump | 400m | 110m H (wind) | Discus | Pole vault | Javelin | 1500m |
|---|---|---|---|---|---|---|---|---|---|
| 10.94 +0.0 PB; 819 | 7.22 +0.0 PB; 865 | 15.35 PB; 809 | 2.03 PB; 882 | 47.51 PB; 923 | 14.84; 866 | 50.04; 873 | 4.80 PB; 1005 | 68.52 PB; 862 | 4:12.61 PB; 714 |

=== Impact ===
After the event, Jenner took an American flag from a spectator and carried it during the victory lap, starting a tradition that became common among winning athletes. Abandoning the vaulting poles in the stadium, with no intention of ever competing again, Jenner stated: "In 1972, I made the decision that I would go four years and totally dedicate myself to what I was doing, and then I would move on after it was over with. I went into that competition knowing that would be the last time I would ever do this." Jenner explained, "It hurts every day when you practice hard. Plus, when this decathlon is over, I got the rest of my life to recuperate. Who cares how bad it hurts?"

Jenner became a national hero and received the James E. Sullivan Award as the top amateur athlete in the United States. Jenner was named Associated Press Male Athlete of the Year in 1976.

Jenner's 1976 world and Olympic records were broken by four points by Daley Thompson at the 1980 Olympics in Moscow. In 1985, Jenner's Olympic decathlon score was reevaluated against the IAAF's updated decathlon scoring table and was reported as 8,634 for comparative purposes. This converted mark stood as the American record until 1991, when it was surpassed by eventual gold medalist and world record holder Dan O'Brien of Dan & Dave fame. As of 2018, Jenner was ranked twenty-sixth on the world all-time list and ninth on the American all-time list.

Jenner was inducted into the US National Track and Field Hall of Fame in 1980, the Olympic Hall of Fame in 1986, the Bay Area Sports Hall of Fame and the Connecticut Sports Hall of Fame in 1994, and the San Jose Sports Hall of Fame in 2010. For almost 20 years, San Jose City College hosted an annual Bruce Jenner Invitational competition.

=== International competitions ===
Representing the United States
| Year | Competition | Venue | Position | Event | Notes |
|---|---|---|---|---|---|
| 1972 | Olympic Games | Munich, Germany | 10th | Decathlon | 7722 pts |
| 1975 | Pan American Games | Mexico City, Mexico | 1st | Decathlon | 8045 pts A |
| 1976 | Olympic Games | Montreal, Canada | 1st | Decathlon | 8618 pts |

=== National events ===
- 1972 United States Olympic Trials: (bronze) (7846 pts)
- 1973 USA Outdoor Track and Field Championships: 5th (7617 pts)
- 1974 USA Outdoor Track and Field Championships: (gold) (8245 pts)
- 1975 French Athletics Championships: (gold) (8058 pts)
- 1976 USA Outdoor Track and Field Championships: (gold) (8542 pts)
- 1976 United States Olympic Trials: (gold) (8538 pts)

=== Personal records ===
All information from IAAF

| Event | Performance | Location | Date | Points |
|---|---|---|---|---|
| Decathlon | —N/a | Montreal | July 29–30, 1976 | 8,618 points |
| 100 meters | 10.94 | Montreal | July 29, 1976 | 819 points |
| Long jump | 7.22 m (23 ft 8 1/4 in) | Montreal | July 29, 1976 | 865 points |
| Shot put | 15.35 m (50 ft 4 1/4 in) | Montreal | July 29, 1976 | 809 points |
| High jump | 2.03 m (6 ft 7 3/4 in) | Montreal | July 29, 1976 | 882 points |
| 400 meters | 47.51 | Montreal | July 29, 1976 | 923 points |
| 110 meters hurdles | 14.84 | Montreal | July 30, 1976 | 866 points |
| Discus throw | 50.04 m (164 ft 2 in) | Montreal | July 30, 1976 | 873 points |
| Pole vault | 4.80 m (15 ft 8 3/4 in) | Montreal | July 30, 1976 | 1,005 points |
| Javelin throw | 68.52 m (224 ft 9 1/2 in) | Montreal | July 30, 1976 | 862 points |
| 1500 meters | 4:12.61 | Montreal | July 30, 1976 | 714 points |
| Virtual Best Performance | | | | 8,618 points |

== Post-Olympic career ==
=== Capitalizing on Olympic fame ===
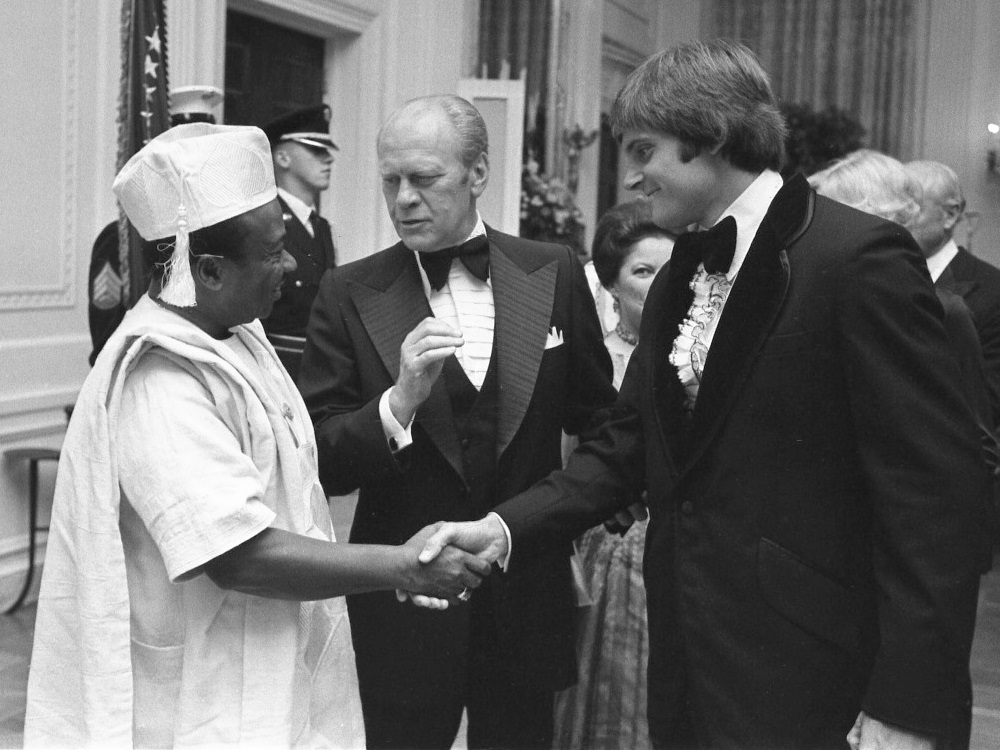
Jenner (right) greets Liberian president William Tolbert at the White House on September 21, 1976, as United States President Gerald Ford looks on

In the 1970s, Olympic athletes were considered to be amateurs and were not allowed to seek or accept payment for their positions as sports celebrities. During the Cold War in 1972, three major Olympic titles that had a long history of American success – basketball, the 100-meter dash, and decathlon – were won by Soviet athletes. All Soviet athletes were professionals, while the United States was limited to amateurs. Jenner became an American hero by returning the decathlon title to the United States. "After the Games were over," Jenner said, "I happened to be the right guy, at that right place, at that right time." Tony Kornheiser of The New York Times wrote that along with Jenner's wife, Chrystie, Jenner was "so high up on the pedestal of American heroism, it would take a crane to get [her] down."

After the expected Olympic success, Jenner planned to cash in on whatever celebrity status could follow a gold medal in the same mold as Johnny Weissmuller and Sonja Henie, who had become major movie stars following their gold medals. This would require forgoing any future Olympic competition. At the time, Jenner's agent George Wallach felt there was a four-year window – until the next Olympics – upon which to capitalize. Wallach reported that Jenner was being considered for the role of Superman, which ultimately went to Christopher Reeve. "I really don't know how many offers we have", Wallach claimed. "There are still unopened telegrams back at the hotel and you just can't believe the offers that poured in during the first two days."

Jenner appeared on the cover of the August 9, 1976, issue of Sports Illustrated, the February 1979 issue of Gentleman's Quarterly, and on the cover of Playgirl magazine. Jenner became a spokesperson for Tropicana, Minolta, and Buster Brown shoes. Jenner was also selected by the Kansas City Kings with the 139th overall pick in the seventh round of the 1977 NBA draft despite not having played basketball since high school. The publicity stunt was executed by team president/general manager Joe Axelson to mock the Kansas City Chiefs' yearly claims that they planned on selecting "the best athlete available" in the National Football League Draft. Jenner was presented with a jersey customized with the number 8618, the Olympic gold medal-winning score, but would never appear as an active player with the Kings.

==== Wheaties spokesperson ====
Image of a throwback Wheaties cereal box featuring Jenner. The box reflects designs from the 1970s when General Mills used Jenner for promoting their breakfast cereal. A vintage box sold in 2015 on eBay for US$400.

In 1977, Jenner became a spokesperson for Wheaties brand breakfast cereal and appeared in a photograph on the cover of the cereal box. After taking over from Olympic champion Bob Richards, Jenner was second in a succession of athletes featured as spokespersons for the brand. Mary Lou Retton succeeded Jenner in 1984.

On November 22, 1977, Jenner went to San Francisco to refute charges filed by San Francisco district attorney Joseph Freitas that General Mills, the maker of Wheaties, had engaged in deceptive advertising in its campaign that featured Jenner. Jenner liked Wheaties and ate the breakfast cereal two or three times a week, which supported the advertising campaign's claims. Two days later, Freitas withdrew the suit, saying that it was "a case of overzealousness" on the part of his staff.

When Jenner came out as a trans woman in 2015, General Mills stated that: "Bruce Jenner continues to be a respected member of Team Wheaties." After a negative response to this initial statement, Mike Siemienas, General Mills's brand media relations manager, clarified it by saying: "Bruce Jenner has been a respected member of Team Wheaties, and Caitlyn Jenner will continue to be."

=== Television and film career ===
Jenner began television appearances in the mid-1970s, both as herself and in character roles. One of Jenner's first recurring television roles was as a co-host of the short-lived daytime talk and variety series America Alive! in 1978. The comedy Can't Stop the Music (1980) was Jenner's first film appearance. She starred in the made-for-TV movies The Golden Moment: An Olympic Love Story (1980) and Grambling's White Tiger (1981). During the 1981–1982 season, Jenner became a semi-regular cast member in the police series CHiPs, guest-starring as Officer Steve McLeish for six episodes, substituting for star Erik Estrada, who was locked in a contract dispute with NBC and MGM. Jenner also revealed personal issues with dyslexia in a 1985 episode of the sitcom Silver Spoons called "Trouble with Words".

Jenner appeared in the series Learn to Read and in the video games Olympic Decathlon (1981) and Bruce Jenner's World Class Decathlon (1996). The "hero shot", the finish of the final event of the 1976 Olympic decathlon, and the Wheaties cover, were parodied by John Belushi on Saturday Night Live, endorsing "Little Chocolate Donuts". In 1989, Jenner played herself in the comedy short Dirty Tennis written by James Van Patten.

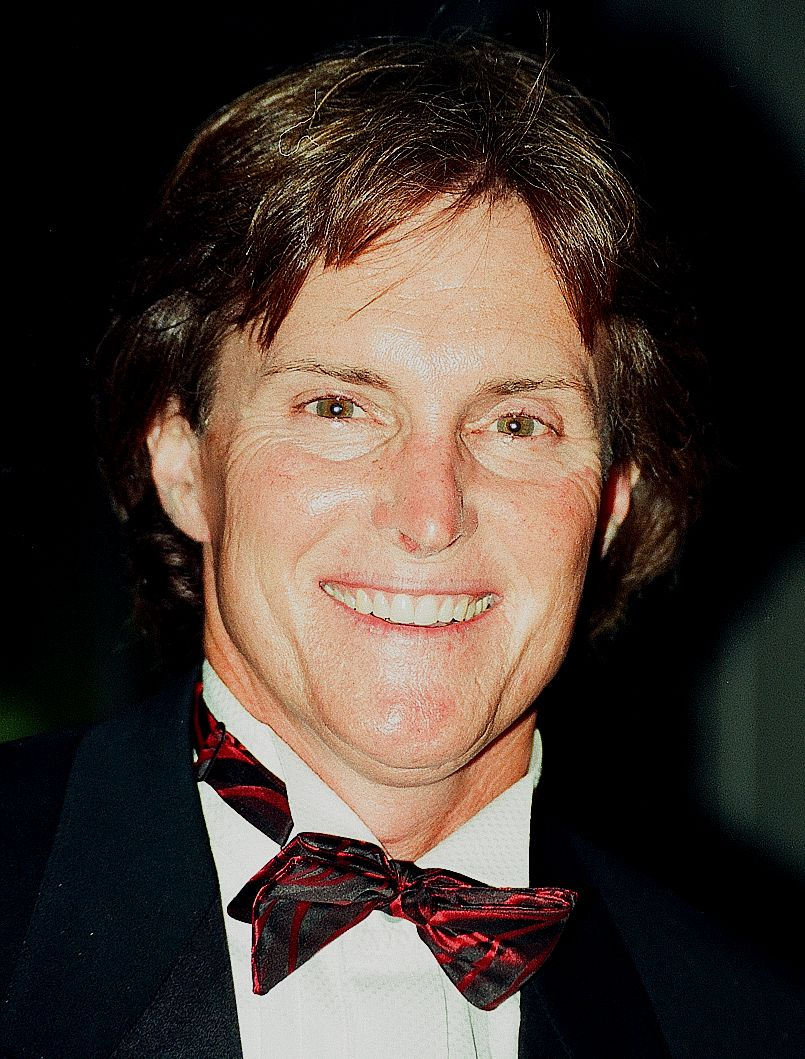
Jenner in 1996

Jenner has appeared in a variety of game shows and reality television programs, including starring with Grits Gresham in an episode of The American Sportsman. In the early 1990s, Jenner was the host of an infomercial for a stair-climbing exercise machine called the Stair Climber Plus.

In January 2002, Jenner participated in an episode of the American series The Weakest Link, featuring Olympic athletes. In February and March 2003, Jenner was part of the cast of the American series I'm a Celebrity...Get Me Out of Here!. She made a cameo appearance in a season-three episode of The Apprentice, which aired in May 2005. She also partnered with Tai Babilonia for Skating with Celebrities in a series that aired January – March 2006 (they were eliminated during the fifth of seven episodes), served as a guest judge on Pet Star on Animal Planet. In November 2010, a photograph of Jenner was shown in a janitor's resume in an episode of It's Always Sunny in Philadelphia.

Additional television and talk show appearances by Jenner include: Nickelodeon's made-for-TV film Gym Teacher: The Movie as well as episodes of Murder, She Wrote, the Lingo Olympic Winners episode, and talk shows such as Hannity and season 1, episode 21 of The Bonnie Hunt Show in 2008.

From late 2007, Jenner has starred in the E! reality series Keeping Up with the Kardashians along with wife Kris Jenner, stepchildren Kourtney, Kimberley, Khloé, and Rob Kardashian (from Kris's marriage to attorney Robert Kardashian), and daughters Kylie and Kendall for 160 episodes. Jenner left the show in 2017, after the thirteenth season, due to her and Kris falling out over her memoir. She made guest appearances in 2020 and 2021, for the 18th and 20th seasons respectively.

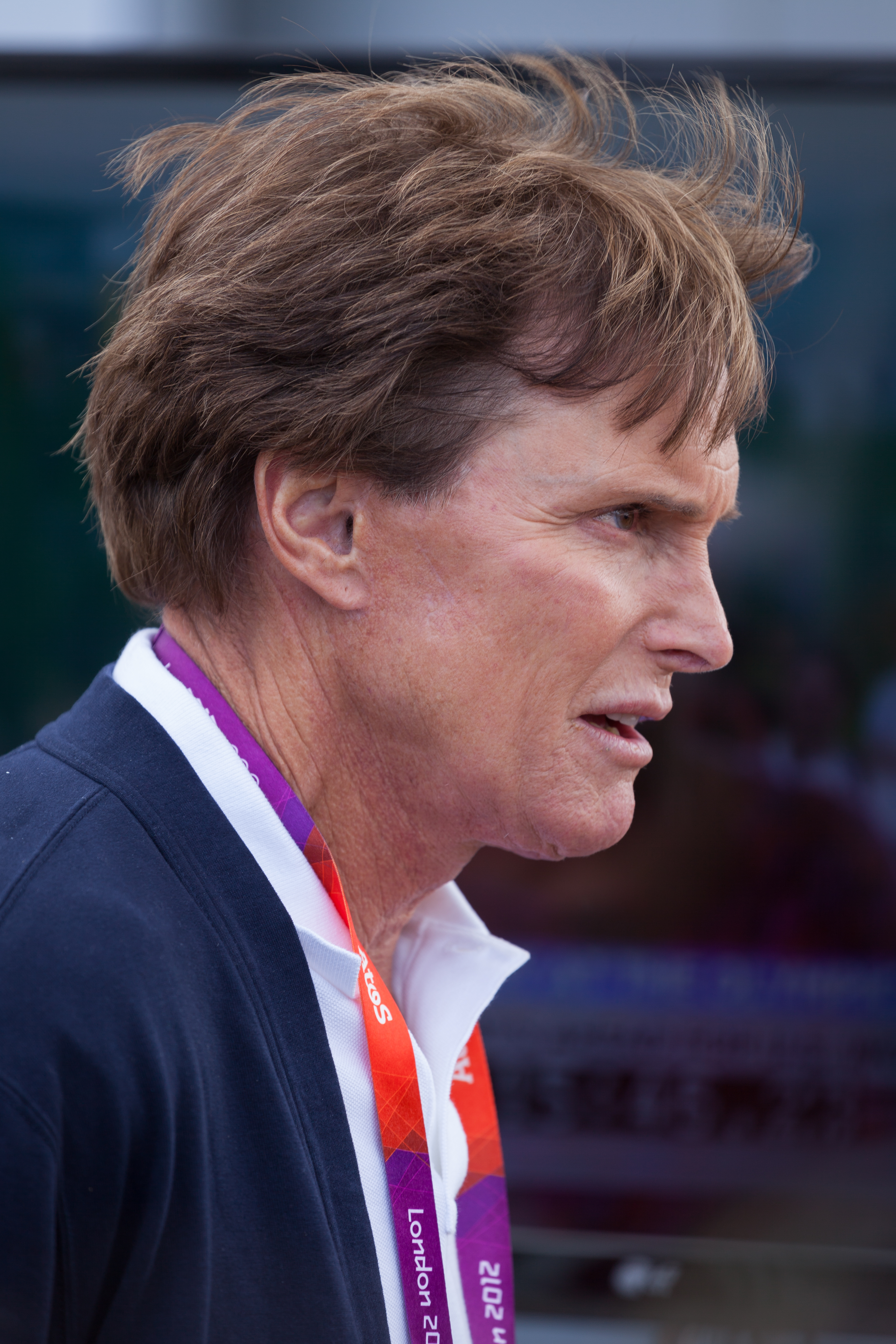
Jenner in 2012

In 2011, Jenner appeared in the Adam Sandler comedy Jack and Jill in a scene with Al Pacino as an actor in a play. Like Can't Stop the Music, the film won the Golden Raspberry Award for Worst Picture and swept every Razzie category.

In September 2016, Jenner appeared in the Amazon Prime TV series Transparent in a dream sequence during the season three episode "To Sardines and Back".

In November 2019, it was announced that Jenner would be participating in the nineteenth series of the British version of I'm a Celebrity...Get Me Out of Here! after having previously appeared on the American iteration in 2003. Jenner ultimately placed sixth in the competition.

In 2021, Jenner appeared as a contestant in season five of The Masked Singer as "Phoenix", being the second contestant to be unmasked and the first of Group B and the show's first transgender contestant. That same year, Jenner appeared in the Australian version of Big Brother VIP. In 2022, Fox News hired Jenner as an on-air contributor.

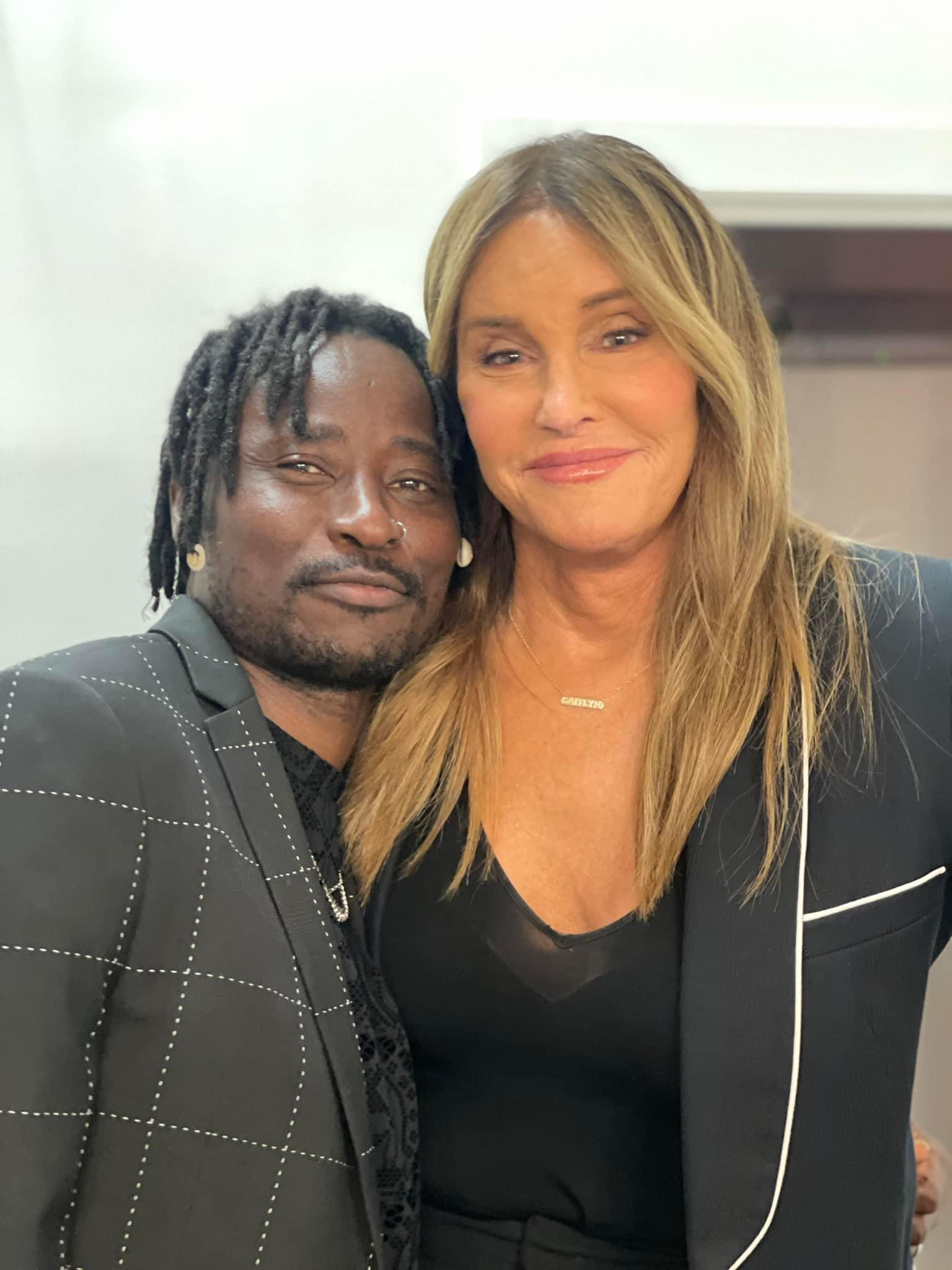
Jenner beside Bisi Alimi in 2023

In 2025, Jenner made a guest appearance on her family's Hulu reality series The Kardashians. It was the first time she had appeared on-screen with her family since the final season of their previous reality series Keeping Up with the Kardashians.

=== Motorsports career ===
Jenner had a short career as a race car driver in the IMSA Camel GT series (International Motor Sports Association) in the 1980s. Jenner's first victory came in the 1986 12 hours of Sebring in the IMSA GTO class driving the 7-Eleven Roush Racing Ford Mustang with co-driver Scott Pruett. The pair won their class and finished 4th overall in the 12-hour endurance race. 1986 was also the most successful year of Jenner's career, finishing second in the championship to Pruett. Jenner commented, "I was a lot more badass runner than I was a driver."

Jenner also competed in the Toyota Pro/Celebrity Race at the Grand Prix of Long Beach, winning in 1979 and 1982. The former win came after holding off Al Unser, while the latter saw Jenner pass Ted Nugent with two laps remaining. In 1980, Jenner was contacted by NASCAR Winston Cup Series team DiGard Motorsports about driving the No. 88 car for the 1981 season; although Jenner expressed interest, Ricky Rudd was ultimately hired for the seat.

In 2022, Jenner founded Jenner Racing, a team in the all-female W Series open-wheel championship. The team lasted just one year before the series folded midseason, though their driver Jamie Chadwick was declared the champion as the points leader when the final races were canceled.

=== Business ===
Jenner had licensed her previous name for Bruce Jenner's Westwood Centers for Nautilus & Aerobics in the early 1980s to David A. Cirotto, president of other local Nautilus & Aerobics Centers. She had no ownership in the licensed name centers, which were solely owned by Cirotto. Jenner's company, Bruce Jenner Aviation, sells aircraft supplies to executives and corporations. Jenner was the business development vice president for a staffing industry software application known as JennerNet, which was based on Lotus Domino technology.

In March 2016, Jenner announced that she had been chosen as the face of H&M Sport. Later that year, H&M created a six-minute film featuring Jenner, called Caitlyn Jenner's Greatest Victories: A Timeline.

== Personal life ==
=== Marriages ===
Prior to gender transition, Jenner had been married three times, first to Chrystie Scott (née Crownover) from 1972 to 1981. They have two children, including son Burt. Jenner and Scott's divorce was finalized the first week of January 1981.

On January 5, 1981, Jenner married songwriter Linda Thompson in Hawaii. They have two sons together, Brandon and Brody. By February 1986, Jenner and Thompson had separated and subsequently divorced. Their sons later starred on the reality show The Princes of Malibu, and Brody appeared in the reality show The Hills.

On April 21, 1991, Jenner married Kris Kardashian (née Houghton) after five months of dating. They have two daughters, Kendall and Kylie. While married, Jenner was also the step-parent to Kris's children from her previous marriage – Kourtney, Kim, Khloé and Rob – who star in Keeping Up with the Kardashians. The couple separated in June 2013, but the separation was not made public until four months later, in October. Kris filed for divorce in September 2014, citing irreconcilable differences. Their divorce terms were finalized in December 2014 and went into effect on March 23, 2015, as mandated by a state legal requirement for a six-months delay after the filing.

Kardashian–Jenner family tree

Robert Kardashian | Kris Houghton | Caitlyn Jenner
Kourtney Kardashian | Travis Barker | Kim Kardashian | Kanye West | Khloé Kardashian | Tristan Thompson | Rob Kardashian | Blac Chyna | Kendall Jenner | Kylie Jenner
North West

=== Fatal car collision ===
In February 2015, Jenner was involved in a fatal multiple-vehicle collision on the Pacific Coast Highway in Malibu, California. Kim Howe, an animal rights activist and actress, was killed when Jenner's SUV ran into Howe's car. Accounts of the sequence of collisions have varied, as have the number of people injured.

Prosecutors declined to file criminal charges, but three civil lawsuits were filed against Jenner by Howe's stepchildren and drivers of other cars involved in the collision. Jessica Steindorff, a Hollywood agent who was hit by Howe's car, settled her case in December 2015. Howe's stepchildren settled their case in January 2016. Financial details were not disclosed in either case.

=== June 2025 trip to Israel ===
Jenner arrived in Israel on June 12, 2025, to attend the Tel Aviv Pride parade scheduled for the next day. The parade was cancelled due to the start of the Iran–Israel war in the early hours of the morning of June 13. In the hours prior to the war breaking out, Jenner toured the Gaza envelope communities impacted by the October 7 attacks. With Iranian missiles falling on Israel, Jenner, along with many Israelis, sought refuge at a public bomb shelter. Israeli influencer Regev Gur posted to social media a photo of himself drinking wine with Jenner from inside the bomb shelter. Although Gur eventually removed the photo, it nonetheless went viral.

With Israel closing its skies to civilian aviation, Jenner was stranded. She eventually left Israel on June 15 by crossing a land border with Jordan, delaying her departure by only 24 hours. Prior to her departure, her hosts organized a farewell ceremony, which was attended by Tel Aviv's deputy mayor, Asaf Zamir.

== Gender transition ==
=== Coming out as a transgender woman ===
The Washington Post commented that Jenner's debut Vanity Fair cover, shot by Annie Leibovitz, had special significance for its subject: "After all the magazine covers that featured the former athlete, once lauded as the 'world's greatest athlete,' the Leibovitz photograph will be the most meaningful. Looking directly at the camera, Jenner is finally herself for the first time publicly."

Jenner's second wife Linda Thompson has noted that Jenner identified as a woman to her shortly before their marriage ended in 1986.

In a 20/20 television interview with Diane Sawyer in April 2015, Jenner came out as a trans woman, saying that she had dealt with gender dysphoria since her youth and that, "for all intents and purposes, I'm a woman". Jenner wore women's clothing for many years and took hormone replacement therapy but stopped after her romance with Kris Kardashian became more serious, leading to marriage in 1991. Jenner recounts having permission to explore her gender identity on her travels but not when they were coupled, and not knowing the best way to talk about the many issues contributed to the deterioration of the 23-year-long marriage, which ended formally in 2015.

In 2015, Jenner said that she has never been sexually attracted to men, but always to women, and that, given the difficulty that many people have understanding the difference between sexual orientation and gender identity, she would identify as asexual for the time being. Jenner underwent cosmetic surgery and completed gender-affirming surgery in January 2017.

=== Media attention ===
In June 2015, Jenner debuted her new name and image, and began publicly using feminine pronoun self-descriptors. Jenner held a renaming ceremony in July 2015, adopting the name Caitlyn Marie Jenner. Before her 20/20 interview, a two-part special titled Keeping Up with the Kardashians: About Bruce was filmed with the family in which she answered questions, and prepared her children for the personal and public aspects of the transition. In the special, which aired in May 2015, the point was emphasized that there is no one right way to transition. Jenner made it a priority to ensure that all her children were independent first before focusing on her transition. In September 2015, her name was legally changed to Caitlyn Marie Jenner and her gender to female.

Jenner's announcement that she is transgender came at an unprecedented time for trans visibility, including legislative initiatives. The 20/20 interview had 20.7 million viewers, making it television's "highest-ever rated newsmagazine telecast among adults 18–49 and adults 25–54". The Daily Beast wrote that Jenner's honesty, vulnerability, and fame may have caused "cheap jokes" about trans people to "seem mean to a mainstream audience on an unprecedented scale". Noting the shift in how comedians treated Jenner's transition, The Daily Beast saw the change as the same evolution that took place in acceptance of LGBT people as a whole when "comedians finally cross the critical threshold from mockery to creativity in their joke-telling".

Jenner's emerging gender identity was revealed in a Vanity Fair interview written by Buzz Bissinger. Annie Leibovitz photographed the cover, the magazine's first to feature an openly transgender woman, which was captioned "Call me Caitlyn". Using her Twitter handle, @Caitlyn_Jenner, she tweeted: "I'm so happy after such a long struggle to be living my true self. Welcome to the world Caitlyn. Can't wait for you to get to know her/me." Time magazine declared this tweet the tenth most retweeted tweet of 2015, based on retweets of tweets by verified users from January 1 to November 10 of that year. Jenner amassed over one million Twitter followers in four hours and three minutes, setting a new Guinness World Record and surpassing United States President Barack Obama, who, a month before, accomplished the same feat in four hours and fifty-two minutes. Four days later, Jenner was up to 2.37 million followers, with another 1.5 million followers on Instagram.

Jenner was also mocked. Beginning in September 2015, she was depicted on the satirical American animated program South Park, which parodied her supporters' political correctness, as well as her driving record. The Jenner-related episodes were "Stunning and Brave", "Where My Country Gone?", "Sponsored Content", "Truth and Advertising" and "PC Principal Final Justice" from the show's 19th season.

In April 2016 during the Republican presidential primaries, Jenner became an exemplar for candidate Donald Trump's opposition to North Carolina's Public Facilities Privacy & Security Act, with Trump saying that Jenner could use any restroom of her choosing at his Trump Tower property. Jenner soon posted a video showing that she had taken Trump up on his offer. She thanked Trump and assured Trump's adversary Ted Cruz that "nobody got molested".

In June 2016, Jenner was one of several celebrities depicted using synthetic nude "sleeping" bodies for the video of Kanye West's song "Famous". Later that month, an episode of Epic Rap Battles of History was released featuring Jenner, as Bruce (portrayed by Peter Shukoff) and then Caitlyn (portrayed by transgender rapper Jolie "NoShame" Drake), rap battling against Bruce Banner (portrayed by Lloyd Ahlquist) then The Hulk (portrayed by Mike O'Hearn).

=== Reception ===
==== General ====
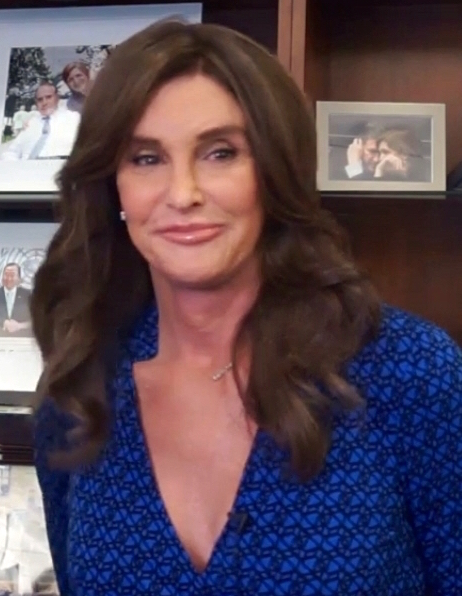
Jenner in 2015

In August 2015, Jenner won the Social Media Queen award at the Teen Choice Awards. In October 2015, Glamour magazine named her one of its 25 Glamour Women of the Year, calling her a "Trans Champion". In November 2015, Jenner was listed as one of Entertainment Weekly's 2015 Entertainers of the Year. In December 2015, she was named Barbara Walters's Most Fascinating Person of 2015. Also in that month, she was listed on Time magazine's eight-person shortlist for the 2015 Person of the Year, and Bing released its list of the year's "Most Searched Celebrities", which Jenner was at the top of, and declared Jenner's Vanity Fair cover the second in a list of "top celeb moments of 2015". She was the second most searched-for person on Google in 2015. In April 2016, she was listed in the Time 100. In June 2016, Jenner became the first openly transgender person to be featured on the cover of Sports Illustrated. The cover and associated story marked the 40th anniversary of her winning the 1976 Summer Olympics decathlon.

Feminist author Germaine Greer called Glamour magazine's decision to award Jenner with a "Woman of the Year" award misogynistic, questioning whether a transgender woman could be better than "someone who is just born a woman." Jenner also received criticism from individuals such as actress Rose McGowan, for stating – in a BuzzFeed interview – that the hardest part about being a woman "is figuring out what to wear". McGowan argued: "We are more than deciding what to wear. We are more than the stereotypes foisted upon us by people like you. You're a woman now? Well fucking learn that we have had a VERY different experience than your life of male privilege." McGowan later stated that she was not transphobic, and added: "Disliking something a trans person has said is no different than disliking something a man has said or that a woman has said. Being trans doesn't make one immune from criticism."

Chris Mandle of The Independent stated: "Jenner has gone on to inspire countless men and women, but her comments, which were made after she was celebrated at Glamour magazine's Women Of The Year in New York were branded 'offensive and insulting'." He added: "People began tweeting the other, harder things women have to deal with, such as institutionalized oppression, abuse, and sexual assault". James Smith, husband of Moira Smith, the only female New York Police Department officer to die from the September 11 attacks, returned Moira's "Woman of the Year" award, given posthumously. Referring to Jenner as a man, he stated that he found Glamour giving Jenner the same award insulting to Moira's memory, and referred to the matter as a publicity stunt. Smith later said that having supported transgender youth and Glamour's decision to honor transgender actress Laverne Cox in 2014, he did not object because Jenner is transgender; he objected to Jenner's "hardest part about being a woman" commentary; this proved to him that Jenner "is not truly a woman. I believe this comment and others he has made trivializes the transgender experience as I have witnessed it."

Conversely, Adrienne Tam of The Daily Telegraph argued that Jenner deserved the Glamour award, stating: "What McGowan failed to take into consideration was the jesting manner in which Jenner spoke." Tam said:

[Jenner] also immediately followed up her "what women wear" dilemma with: It's more than that. I'm kind of at this point in my life where I'm trying to figure this womanhood thing out. It is more than hair, makeup, clothes, all that kind of stuff. There's an element here that I'm still kind of searching for. And I think that'll take a while. Because I think as far as gender, we're all on a journey. We're all learning and growing about ourselves. And I feel the same way.

Tam considered McGowan's criticism to be over the top, and stated of James Smith's criticism, "The salient point here is one about courage. We easily recognize physical courage such as saving orphans from burning buildings, or ordinary people putting their lives in the line of fire. It is far harder to recognize mental courage." She added: "Without a doubt, the police officer who died in the September 11 attacks was courageous. But so is Jenner. It's a different kind of courage, but it is courage nonetheless."

==== LGBT community ====
Since coming out as a trans woman in 2015, Jenner has been called the most famous openly transgender woman in the world. She is also one of the most recognized LGBT people in the world and arguably the most famous LGBT athlete. Jenner said that her visibility was partly to bring attention to gender dysphoria, violence against trans women, and other transgender issues. She also sought to promote more informed discussion of LGBT issues. She signed with Creative Artists Agency's speakers department and will collaborate with the CAA Foundation on a philanthropic strategy focusing on LGBT issues. She made a private appearance at the Los Angeles LGBT Center in June 2015, where she spoke with trans youth.

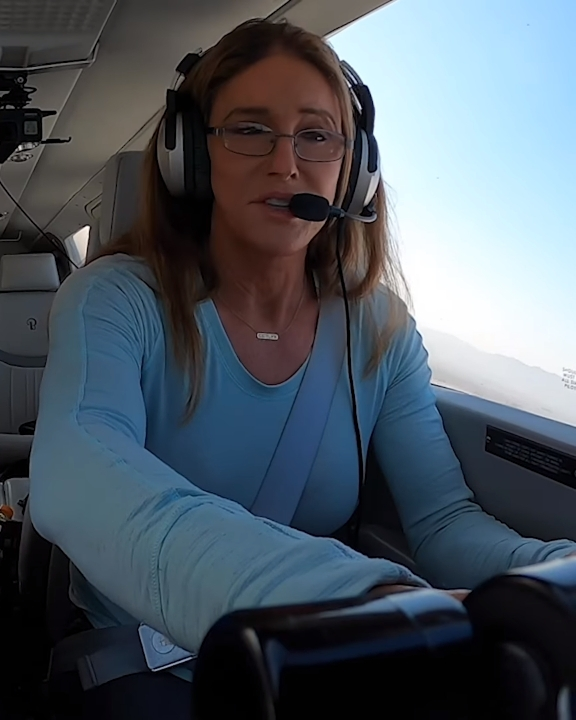
Jenner in 2020

Jenner received the Arthur Ashe Courage Award during the 2015 ESPY Awards in July 2015. ESPN executive producer Maura Mandt said Jenner was given the award because "she has shown the courage to embrace a truth that had been hidden for years, and to embark on a journey that may not only give comfort to those facing similar circumstances but can also help to educate people on the challenges that the transgender community faces." She is the third consecutive openly LGBT person to receive the award following footballer Michael Sam (2014) and anchorwoman Robin Roberts (2013).

In October, Jenner presented the Point Foundation's Horizon Award to television producers Rhys Ernst (of the show Transparent) and Zach Zyskowski (of the show Becoming Us). This was her second public speaking engagement after her gender transition.

In November, Jenner was listed as one of the nine runners-up for The Advocate's Person of the Year. That month she was also listed as one of the Out100 of 2015, with Out magazine calling her the "Newsmaker of the Year." On International Human Rights Day, Jenner discussed transgender rights with Samantha Power, the U.S. Ambassador to the United Nations. In 2016, Jenner was on the cover of The Advocate's February/March issue.

MAC Cosmetics collaborated with Jenner on a lipstick, called Finally Free, which was made available for purchase on April 8, 2016, with MAC stating, "100% of the selling price goes to the MAC AIDS Fund Transgender Initiative, to further its work in support of transgender communities." Also in April 2016, Jenner was listed as No. 8 on Out magazine's Power 50 list. In May 2016, her interview with Diane Sawyer in 2015 won Outstanding TV Journalism – Newsmagazine at the GLAAD Media Awards.

In 2021, Jenner's decision to run for governor of California was met with pushback from many LGBT activists and trans people, with activists criticizing Jenner for her views on transgender issues and support for the Republican Party. Katelyn Burns of Vox said, "Jenner's politics and controversial existence as a self-professed trans advocate has long put trans Americans in a double bind, forcing them to defend her from transphobic attacks while deploring her political views." This decision became even more controversial following Jenner's opposition to trans girls in girls' sports, with some advocates saying that Jenner "did not represent the broader LGBT community".

In 2022, Jenner said that trans swimmer Lia Thomas was not the "rightful winner" of the NCAA Division I women's 500-yard freestyle event, adding "It's not transphobic or anti-trans, it's COMMON SENSE!".

==== Show and memoir ====
Jenner's gender transition is the subject of I Am Cait, initially an eight-part TV documentary series, which premiered on E! in July 2015 to an audience of 2.7 million viewers. Jenner is an executive producer of the show. The show focuses on Jenner's transition and how it affects her relationships with her family and friends. The show also explores how Jenner adjusts to what she sees as her job as a role model for the transgender community. In October 2015, the show was renewed for a second season, which premiered on March 6, 2016. The show tied for Outstanding Reality Program at the GLAAD Media Awards in 2016.

Jenner's memoir, The Secrets of My Life, was published on April 25, 2017.

== Politics ==
=== Political stances ===
Jenner identifies as a conservative and a Republican. She describes herself as socially liberal and fiscally conservative. "I have gotten more flak for being a conservative Republican than I have for being trans", she has said. Although stopping short of an endorsement, Jenner said she liked Ted Cruz in the 2016 Republican presidential primaries. On her reality show I Am Cait, Jenner said that although she does not support Donald Trump, she thinks he would be good for women's issues; she then stated she would never support Hillary Clinton. Jenner said she voted for Trump in the 2016 presidential election, although according to Politico, voter records show she never cast a ballot in the election.

Jenner is a supporter and advocate for the Israeli government. In 2024, with pro-Palestinian protests erupting in universities all over the country, Jenner called for the deportation from the United States of the pro-Palestinian protesters.

In February 2017, President Trump rescinded federal requirements giving transgender students the right to choose the school restroom matching their gender identity. In response, Jenner tweeted "Well @realDonaldTrump, from one Republican to another, this is a disaster. You made a promise to protect the LGBTQ community. Call me."

In April 2017, Jenner said she was in favor of same-sex marriage.

In July 2017, Jenner stated that she was contemplating running in the 2018 race for the U.S. Senate to represent California. Later in the month, she condemned Trump for issuing an order to reinstate a ban on transgender people from serving in the military. In her tweet, she wrote "What happened to your promise to fight for them?", juxtaposing it with Trump's tweet from June 2016 in which he promised to fight for the LGBT community.

In October 2018, Jenner withdrew her support of Donald Trump; she felt "that the trans community was relentlessly attacked by [Trump]", contrary to her expectations. Her reversal came after a Trump administration proposal to restrict the legal definition of a person's gender to that assigned at birth.

In September 2021, Jenner supported the Texas Heartbeat Act which made all post-six-week abortions illegal. She told CNN: "I'm for a woman's right to choose. I am also for a state having the ability to make their own laws."

In April 2024, Jenner again reversed her position by supporting Donald Trump in the 2024 presidential election.

In April 2026, she said in a TV interview that she had written to Trump for assistance with difficulties created by her new passport stating her sex as male, according to the new law passed in November 2025. Despite receiving no response from him, she affirmed her support and "love" for Trump. She was widely mocked on social media by left-leaning people for her continuing support for the party which they believe is negatively affecting her life.

=== 2021 California gubernatorial recall election ===
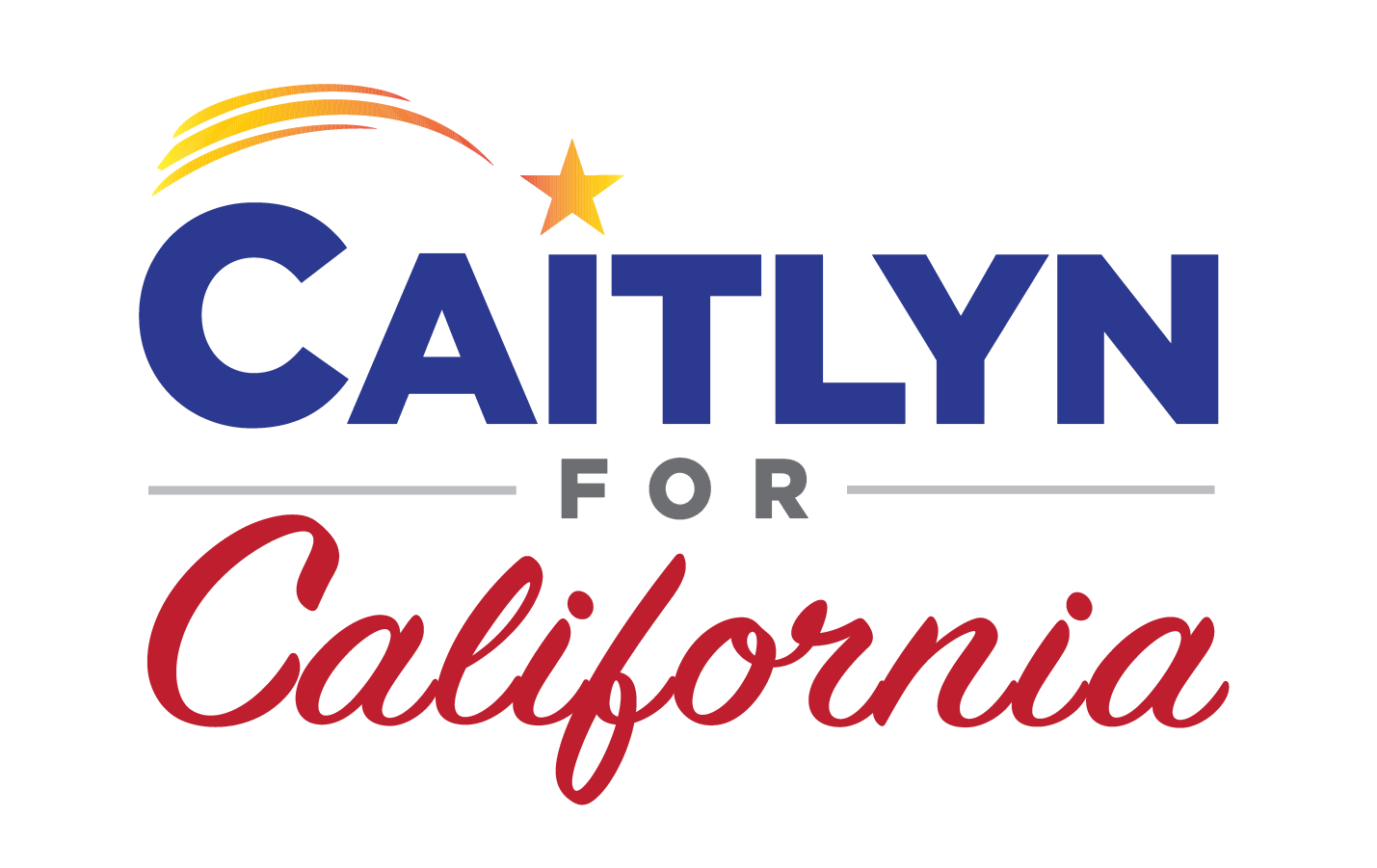
Jenner's gubernatorial campaign logo

In early April 2021, it was reported that Jenner was considering running for Governor of California in the 2021 recall gubernatorial election as a Republican. Later in the month on April 23, Jenner launched her campaign for governor.

In May 2021, during her run, Jenner stated in an interview with TMZ that trans girls should not be allowed to compete in girls' sports at school, backing Republican Party views on transgender people in sports. Jenner reiterated her views on Twitter the next day, stating that "it's an issue of fairness and we need to protect girls' sports in our schools." She has been criticized by many transgender rights advocates who do not see her as an asset to their cause.

In her pitch to voters, Jenner has likened herself to Donald Trump, calling herself a "disrupter" like Trump.

During the campaign, Jenner left the United States, going to Australia in order to compete on that country's television series Big Brother VIP. Although invited to take part in candidate debates, she did not participate. Jenner fought Governor Gavin Newsom in court to prevent the California Secretary of State from placing Newsom's party affiliation on the ballot, and won the legal battle.

Jenner ended up in 13th place with 75,215 votes, which was one percent of the votes cast for replacement candidates.

== Filmography ==
=== Film ===
| Year | Title | Role | Notes | Ref. |
|---|---|---|---|---|
| 1980 | Can't Stop the Music | Ron White | | |
| 1992 | Toyz | Store Customer | Direct-to-video; Cameo | |
| 2011 | Jack and Jill | Herself | Uncredited cameo | |
| 2014 | The Hungover Games | Skip Wagner | | |

=== Television ===
| Year | Title | Role | Notes | Ref. |
|---|---|---|---|---|
| 1980 | The Golden Moment: An Olympic Love Story | Peter Harding | Television film | |
| 1981 | Grambling's White Tiger | Jim Radford | Television film | |
| 1981–1982 | CHiPs | Officer Steve McLeish | Main cast (7 episodes) | |
| 1985 | Silver Spoons | Special Guest | Episode: "The Ricks Have It" | |
| 1985 | Murder, She Wrote | Zak Farrell | Episode: "Flim Flam" | |
| 1994 | Me and the Boys | Herself | Episode: "Bad Influences" | |
| 2002 | I'm a Celebrity...Get Me Out of Here! (US) | Contestant | Season 1 | |
| 2003 | The Guy of Your Dreams | Herself | Episode: "The Golden Guy" | |
| 2005 | The Princes of Malibu | Herself | Cast member (6 episodes) | |
| 2007–2021 | Keeping Up with the Kardashians | Herself | Main cast (Seasons 1–13); Guest (Season 20) | |
| 2015 | Transparent | Herself | Guest appearance (Season 3) | |
| 2015–2016 | I Am Cait | Herself | Documentary series; Executive producer | |
| 2017 | The Secrets of My Life | Herself | Television special | |
| 2019 | I'm a Celebrity...Get Me Out of Here! (UK) | Contestant | Series 19 | |
| 2021 | The Masked Singer (US) | Contestant (Phoenix) | Season 5 | |
| 2021 | Big Brother VIP (Australia) | Contestant | Season 1 | |
| 2023 | House of Kardashian | Herself | 3-part documentary series | |

=== Podcasts ===
| Year | Title | Role | Notes | Ref. |
|---|---|---|---|---|
| 2021 | The Skinny Confidential Him & Her Podcast | Guest | Episode discussing her transition and public life | |
| 2022 | The Pivot Podcast | Guest | Episode discussing her Olympic career and family | |

== See also ==
- History of transgender people in the United States
- LGBTQ conservatism in the United States
- List of American sportsperson-politicians
- List of athletes on Wheaties boxes
- List of multi-sport athletes
- List of transgender people

Records
| Preceded by (Soviet Union) Mykola Avilov | Men's decathlon world record holder August 10, 1975 – May 15, 1980 | Succeeded by (United Kingdom) Daley Thompson |
