= Modesto Relays =

Annual track and field competition

The Modesto Relays, now known as the California Invitational Relays is an annual elite track and field meet. It is held about the second weekend in May. For 67 years, the meet was held at Modesto Junior College in Modesto, California, a track notable for tight turns and long straightaways, ending in 2008. During its run in Modesto, it was the site of over 30 world records. After taking the 2009 season off, the meet moved to Hughes Stadium at Sacramento City College in Sacramento, California.

The meet director for most of that time was National Track and Field Hall of Fame member Tom Moore, a former elite hurdler from the University of California. As an athlete, Moore had tied the world record in the 120 yard high hurdles in 1935. Moore's name would become synonymous with the Modesto Relays. Moore served as the starter for the first meet for all but one race . . . the high hurdles, which he won. He had his running shorts on under his uniform and hastily changed to run. But Moore did almost everything else to make the meet what it became, from adjusting the lights toward the track (rather than just the football field) to obtaining sponsorship from S&W Foods that brought notoriety to the otherwise sleepy Central Valley town. When S&W dropped its sponsorship, Moore found a new sponsor in Coca-Cola.

There are many quirky stories to the long history of the meet. "Dutch" Warmerdam set a world record in the pole vault, but only after the standards were repaired at the college welding shop. After the record, an excited official knocked over the standard again. When the bar was remeasured, Warmerdam lost 1/4 of an inch and a brawl ensued. The world record stood for 15 years. 58 years later, Stacy Dragila also set a world record in the pole vault at the meet. Double Olympic Gold medalist, Bob Richards negotiated a $75 cash bonus if he broke the meet record. When he arrived, he discovered the meet record was the world record, which Richards never achieved in his career.

In 1961, when reigning Olympic Champion Herb Elliott dropped out of a heavily promoted mile race with Dyrol Burleson (promoted as the cover story in Sports Illustrated), the packed stadium was silenced in disappointment. They became ecstatic when a then unknown Jim Beatty improved his personal best by seven seconds to set the American record at 3:58.0. That same meet saw Ralph Boston become the first man to jump 27 feet in the long jump.

And the strong winds at Modesto made the discus throw a record setting event. Jay Silvester set the world record in 1968. Ben Plucknett did the same in 1981, but his record was removed after he tested positive for steroids.

After his death, in 2004, the meet was renamed the "Tom Moore Modesto Relays."
