= Bruce Jenner's World Class Decathlon =

1996 sports video game

- Developer: Interactive Magic
- Publisher: Dallas Multimedia
- Platform: Microsoft Windows
- Release: NA: June 30, 1996
- Genre: Decathlon
- Mode: Single player

Bruce Jenner's World Class Decathlon is a 1996 sports video game.

== Gameplay ==
In the game, the player participates in a decathlon.

== Reception ==
Reception

Review scores
Publication	Score
CNET Gamecenter	4/10
Computer Gaming World	1.5/5
GameRevolution	C+
GameSpot	4.4/10
Next Generation	2/5
PC Gamer (UK)	33%
PC Gamer (US)	52%

The game received unfavorable reviews. A reviewer for Next Generation said, "A decathlon simulation is a novel idea, but this implementation simply isn't exciting enough to do the job." GameSpot's Hugo Foster made similar remarks, and added that the simplicity of the gameplay makes the results essentially arbitrary once the player has mastered the rudimentary skills involved, which removes any potential excitement from the multiplayer mode: "You find yourself begging for results, rather than feeling that you've done something to deserve them." However, he praised the included interview and commentaries from Jenner.
