= Brandon Jenner =

American musician and television personality

- Born: June 4, 1981 (age 45); Los Angeles, California, U.S.
- Occupations: Singer; songwriter; television personality
- Television: Keeping Up with the Kardashians; The Princes of Malibu
- Spouses: Leah Felder (m. 2012; div. 2019); Cayley Stoker (m. 2020)
- Children: 4
- Parents: Caitlyn Jenner (Note: Caitlyn fathered Brandon prior to her gender transition); Linda Thompson
- Relatives: Brody Jenner (brother); Burt Jenner (half-brother); Kendall Jenner (half-sister); Kylie Jenner (half-sister)

Brandon Jenner (born June 4, 1981) is an American singer-songwriter and television personality from Malibu, California. He is known for his appearances in Keeping Up with the Kardashians, The Princes of Malibu, and The Hills: New Beginnings.

== Early life ==
Jenner was born on June 4, 1981, in Los Angeles, California to television personality and Olympic gold medalist Caitlyn Jenner, and actress and songwriter Linda Thompson. He has one younger brother Brody Jenner and two half-siblings, Burt and Casey, from Caitlyn's previous marriage to Chrystie Crownover, which lasted from 1972 to 1981.

After Jenner's parents divorced in 1986, Caitlyn Jenner remarried for the third time in 1991, to Kris Kardashian, ex-wife of attorney Robert Kardashian. Jenner became a stepbrother to Kourtney, Kim, Khloe and Rob. Kris gave birth to his younger half-sisters Kendall and Kylie Jenner in 1995 and 1997, respectively. Caitlyn and her family moved to Calabasas, California while Jenner and his brother remained in Malibu.

Jenner's mother Linda Thompson remarried in 1991 to composer David Foster. Jenner and his brother Brody have stated that after his father Caitlyn's marriage to Kris, Caitlyn became gradually less present in their life, leading to them to eventually becoming estranged and being raised by their mother and stepfather composer David Foster, who they considered their main paternal figure. They were raised in Malibu, California and attended Crossroads School in Santa Monica. Thompson and Foster divorced in 2005 after 15 years together.

== Career ==
In 2005, Jenner starred in the reality television series The Princes of Malibu alongside his brother Brody Jenner, mother Linda Thompson, stepfather David Foster and friend Spencer Pratt.

Jenner made appearances in his step-sisters' shows Kourtney and Kim Take New York in 2011 and Keeping Up with the Kardashians in 2013. In 2015, he appeared in his father's Caitlyn Jenner's show I Am Cait, which chronicled her gender transition.

In 2005, he formed a band with his then girlfriend Leah Felder called Big Dume. In 2012, Jenner and Felder formed indie pop group Brandon & Leah, signed to Ear Fetish music label. They released two albums, Cronies (2013) and Together (2014). Their song "Showstopper" became the theme song for Jenner's step-sisters' show Kourtney & Kim Take Miami. The group disbanded following their divorce. Since then, Jenner has been releasing music as a solo artist.

In 2024, Jenner starred in his own docuseries At Home with the Jenners on streaming network UnchainedTV, documenting life with his wife Cayley Stoker and their kids in Malibu, California.

== Personal life ==
From 2004 to 2018, Jenner was in a relationship with musician Leah Felder, daughter of former Eagles guitarist Don Felder, whom he met in middle school. They married in Hawaii on May 31, 2012, and welcomed their daughter Eva James Jenner on July 22, 2015. They separated in 2018 after 14 years together, and their divorce was finalized in 2019.

In 2019, he began dating Cayley Stoker, granddaughter of photographer Joan Almond. They married in a civil ceremony at the Santa Barbara County Courthouse on January 26, 2020, while Stoker was eight months pregnant. Jenner's daughter Eva and Cayley's grandmother served as witnesses. They welcomed twin sons Bo Thompson and Sam Stoker in February 2020, and daughter Joan Almond in August 2024. They reside in Malibu, California.
