= L. D. Weldon =

American track and field coach (1908–1989)

L. D. Weldon (Note: His given name was in the form of initials.) (1908 – May 6, 1989) was an American track and field coach. He trained decathletes, including two Olympic medal winners, 40 years apart.

== Early career ==
A native of California, in 1925 Weldon moved to Graceland Academy in Lamoni, Iowa for the final two years of high school. He continued there to Graceland College for his first year of college before transferring to the University of Iowa. As an athlete at Graceland, he won the javelin throw at the nearby Drake Relays and at the Kansas Relays in 1928. After a mandatory year of ineligibility due to his transfer, he returned in 1930 to repeat his wins at Drake Relays and Kansas Relays, plus the Texas Relays hitting the trifecta of top national competition.

== Sacramento City College ==
After graduating Weldon found work coaching at Sacramento City College from 1931 to 1945. He was elected to the school's Hall of Fame in 1997.

His first big coaching success was Jack Parker, a farm boy from Lamoni, Iowa, whom he recruited to Sacramento. In the summer of 1936, Weldon drove Parker to the decathlon Olympic Trials in Milwaukee, Wisconsin. Parker finished in third place, qualifying him for the 1936 Olympics. Against the best athletes in the world, the American team finished 1–2–3, with Parker taking the bronze medal.

Other athletes coached by Weldon included:

- Tom Moore, who later achieved the world record in the 120-yard high hurdles after transferring to the University of California, Berkeley.
- Joe Batiste, who set the junior college record at Sacramento and won the national championship in the 120-yard high hurdles. Batiste qualified for both the 1940 and 1944 Olympic teams, but the Olympics were suspended during World War II. With Batiste as a multi-event star, Sacramento won the National Junior College Championship in both 1941 and 1942.
- Lou Nova was a member of Weldon's 1933 track team, but the coach advised him his best sport might be boxing. Nova took that advice. He beat former title holder Max Baer twice, the first time in 1939 during the first televised boxing match. He later fought Joe Louis for the title before retiring to become an actor.

During World War II, Weldon coached the Sacramento football team to undefeated seasons in 1941 and 1942. The team suffered just one loss in 1943.

== Hiatus ==
In 1945, Weldon's heart condition forced his retirement from coaching at Sacramento City College. For the next eight years, he worked as a beekeeper and farm equipment salesman in Moorhead, Iowa. In 1953 he felt healthy enough to return to coaching at Amphitheater High School in Tucson, Arizona, the hometown of his star athlete, Joe Batiste, while working on his master's degree at the University of Arizona.

In 1959, Welton took positions as athletic director and track coach at his alma mater, Graceland College. His Graceland track teams dominated the Missouri College Athletic Union and later the Heart of America Athletic Conference, winning eleven conference titles during his fourteen years at the school.

== Jenner ==
Weldon offered a $250 football scholarship to an athletic quarterback and water skiing champion from Connecticut, Bruce Jenner. (Note: Jenner changed her name due to gender transition in 2015.) A knee injury during Jenner's first season required surgery on January 1, 1969. As he did with Lou Nova, Weldon suggested Jenner might try a different athletic pursuit, this time the decathlon. He trained Jenner, whose first competition in 1970 was at the Drake Relays in Des Moines, Iowa where Jenner placed fifth. A year later, Jenner was the NAIA Champion. In 1972 Jenner made the Olympic team by finishing third at the Olympic Trials. At the 1972 Olympics, the first event after the Munich massacre was the decathlon. Jenner watched Mykola Avilov beat Bill Toomey's world record while Jenner finished in tenth place, but remained strongly motivated in defeat. After Jenner graduated from Graceland, Weldon took emeritus status with the college. Jenner moved to San Jose, California and began an intense training regimen while corresponding with Weldon. By 1974, Jenner was the United States National Champion and surpassed Avilov's world record in 1975. Jenner set another record at the Olympic trials, though it was clouded by a timing malfunction in other heats. Jenner settled any questions by setting a new world record and winning a gold medal at the 1976 Olympics. Jenner subsequently retired from athletics and capitalized on her celebrity by becoming an actor.
