= Tom Moore (track) =

American track and field athlete and promoter (1914–2002)

Personal information
- Born: April 14, 1914 Berkeley, California
- Died: May 10, 2004 (aged 82) Modesto, California

Sport
- Country: United States
- Sport: Track and field
- Event: 400m hurdles

Achievements and titles
- Personal bests: 110 m hurdles: 14.2 (California 1935); 400 m: 53.5 (California 1935)

Tom Moore (April 14, 1914 – May 10, 2002) was an American promoter and athlete for track and field. He was the US champion of the 400m hurdles in 1935, and tied the world record in the 110m hurdles in the same year. After his retirement from track, he worked as the head of the United States Olympic Committee and Modesto Relays. Moore was inducted into the National Track and Field Hall of Fame as an event director in 1988.

== Early life and education ==
Moore was born on 14 April 1914 in Berkeley, California. He attended Petaluma High School and ran track and field for the school. After graduation, he ran for Sacramento City College, where he was coached by L.D. Weldon (both would later become early members of Sacramento's Hall of Fame). before attending University of California. As a hurdler for the University of California, Moore tied the world record in the 120 yard high hurdles (the imperial distance equivalent to the 110 metre hurdles) at 14.2 seconds.

== Career ==
=== Athletic career ===
Moore was the 1935 United States Champion in the 400 metres hurdles with a time of 53.5 seconds. Sports Illustrated published a picture of him in Milan, Italy during the 1935 European season, helping carry injured sprinter Eulace Peacock off the track. Despite his times, Moore was unable to compete in the 1935 Olympics due to a pneumonia infection.

Moore competed for the Olympic Club in the high hurdles and 220 yard hurdles into the 1940s. In 1942, he was asked to help with a startup track and field event at Modesto Junior College. Moore served as the starter for the first meet for all but one race (the high hurdles), which he won. He had his running shorts on under his uniform and hastily changed to run.

=== Modesto Relays ===
After his retirement from running, Moore gained a reputation as a top track and field official. For most of its 67-year run in Modesto, Moore's name would go on to become synonymous with the event called the Modesto Relays. Moore attracting top name talent to adjusting the lights toward the track (rather than just the football field). Moore found sponsorship from S&W Foods that brought notoriety to the otherwise sleepy Central Valley town. When S&W dropped its sponsorship in 1994, Moore found a new sponsor in Coca-Cola.

At the first meet in 1942, Cornelius Warmerdam set a world record in the pole vault with a bamboo pole. More than a decade later, double Olympic Gold medalist Bob Richards negotiated a $75 cash bonus if he broke the meet record, which Moore agreed to. When Richards arrived, he discovered the meet record was the world record, which he never achieved in his career.

Moore served as head of the United States Olympic Committee's task force to select a bidding city for the 2012 Summer Olympics. He was elected into the National Track and Field Hall of Fame as an Event Director in 1988. In 2007, he was given the Howard Schmertz Lifetime Achievement Award by the U.S. Track Meet Directors Association. After his death in 2004, the Modesto Relays was renamed the "Tom Moore Modesto Relays."

== Personal life ==
Moore died on 10 May 2004 from bone cancer, one day before that year's Modesto Relays.
