= Ghost Game (film) =

- Directed by: Joe Knee
- Written by: David W. Keffer; Benjamin Oren
- Produced by: Jeff Berry; Joe Knee; Elsa Ramo; Nick Soares; Rick Thompson
- Starring: Alexandra Barreto; Shelby Fenner; Erik Woods
- Cinematography: Joe Knee
- Edited by: Marco Escalante; Joe Knee
- Music by: Jeff Russo
- Production companies: Autumn Entertainment; The Syndicate
- Distributed by: Constantin Film
- Release date: November 15, 2004
- Running time: 102 minutes
- Country: United States
- Language: English
- Budget: $200,000

Ghost Game is a 2004 comedy-horror film directed by Joe Knee and stars Alexandra Barreto, Shelby Fenner and Erik Woods.

== Plot ==
It should be a relaxing weekend in a remote cabin in the woods, as far away from big city bustle and the usual routine. But for the group of young people who wanted to meet here for camping, there is different. When they find a mysterious game and play it despite every warning, they unknowingly invoke three hideous ghosts; witches who only have one thing in mind: the death of the group. Only when it is possible to solve the various mysteries in time, can they hope to escape the clutches of the evil they have awoken and, for the parties, it's a merciless race of death against life.

== Cast ==
- Alexandra Barreto as Dara
- Shelby Fenner as Abbey
- Curt Cornelius as Rand
- Aaron Patrick Freeman as Sebastian
- Robert Berson as Cousin Ted
- Danielle Hartnett as Talia
- Peter Cilella as Nate
- Erik Woods as Simon Brady
- Caroline D'Amore as Rachel
- Sahra Silanee as Lucy
- Sarah Shoup as Jessi
- Jamie Alexander as Sportscaster

== Release ==
The film premiered on 15 November 2004 in Los Angeles, California, and was released on DVD in Germany on 7 September 2006 as part of the Constantin Film series Horror Hoch Drei alongside The Dark and The Cave.
