= Sex with Brody =

- Genre: Talk show
- Presented by: Brody Jenner; Mike Dow; Stevie Ryan
- Country of origin: United States
- Original language: English
- No. of seasons: 1
- No. of episodes: 4

Production
- Executive producers: Brody Jenner; Matt Osborn; David Friedman; Eric Podwall
- Camera setup: Multiple
- Running time: 42 minutes
- Production company: Wilshire Studios

Original release
- Network: E!
- Release: July 10 – July 31, 2015

Sex with Brody is an American talk show that premiered on July 10, 2015, on E! television network. Announced in April 2015, the show features television personality Brody Jenner, actress Stevie Ryan, and relationship therapist Dr. Mike Dow as they discuss various topics related to sex and relationships.

The four-episode series is a call-in talk show based on podcast series The Brody Jenner Podcast With Dr. Mike Dow launched in January. Every episode features a celebrity guest who joins the conversation and shares their personal experience.

== Episodes ==
No.	Title	Original release date	U.S. viewers (millions)
1	"Episode 1"	July 10, 2015	0.31
Guest: actress and singer Christina Milian
2	"Episode 2"	July 17, 2015	0.17
Guest: actress and model April Rose Haydock
3	"Episode 3"	July 24, 2015	0.25
Guest: actress and model Nadine Velazquez
4	"Episode 4"	July 31, 2015	0.16
Guest: model and television personality Joanna Krupa

== Reception ==
The series has received negative reviews from television critics. Amy Amatangelo of The Hollywood Reporter criticized the show for being too misogynistic. Amatangelo said, "If you want to listen to Brody Jenner talk about his sex life while intermittently insulting and degrading women, then Sex With Brody is for you. For the rest of us, there are plenty of other TV shows out there."

David Hinckley, writing for New York Daily News, said that the show "has some funny one-liners, along with stray pieces of useful information from Dr. Mike." However, he also added, "But the real goal of any sex-talk show, let’s be honest, is cheap thrills. Its hosts or callers creating “Dude, I can’t believe someone said that on TV!” moments." Hinckley went on to write that the show was done better 30 years prior by sex therapist Dr. Ruth.

== Broadcast ==
Sex with Brody premiered on July 10, 2015, in the United States on the E! cable network at 10:30/9:30pm ET/PT, following the infotainment series The Soup. The show aired every week on Friday nights and concluded on July 31, 2015. The series was additionally broadcast on local versions of the network worldwide; the series premiered in Australia and New Zealand on August 2 on E!, and on July 19, 2015 in the United Kingdom.
