= Brandon & Leah =

2010s American indie pop duo

- Origin: Malibu, California
- Genre: Indie pop
- Years active: 2013–2018
- Label: Ear Fetish
- Past members: Brandon Jenner; Leah Felder

Brandon & Leah were an American-based indie pop group made up of former husband and wife team Brandon Jenner and Leah Felder.

== History ==
Brandon and Leah met in middle school and began playing music together in high school. In 2005, he formed a band with his then girlfriend Leah Felder called Big Dume. They were married on May 31, 2012, in Hawaii outside the St. Regis Princeville Resort.

In 2012, Jenner and Felder formed indie pop group Brandon & Leah, signed to the Ear Fetish record label. Their sound has been described as indie pop, hip-hop based reggae, and electro-pop-soul. They are influenced by soul, reggae, pop, and hip-hop.

The duo gained popularity when their single, "Showstopper" was used as the theme song for Kourtney and Kim Take Miami on E! Entertainment. Initially Brandon and Leah were signed to Warner Bros. Records, but they soon opted to release their music on their own.

Along with Tony Berg, they produced their debut EP, Cronies, which was released on April 9, 2013. It has reached #82 on the Billboard 200, #16 on the Billboard Independent Albums Chart, and #24 on the Billboard Digital Albums chart. They released their second EP, Together, on October 14, 2014.

In September 2018, Brandon and Leah announced that Leah filed for divorce after 14 years together. Their date of separation was July 10, 2018, and the divorce was finalised July 15, 2019. Since then, they both have released music as solo artists.

== Discography ==
EP:

- Cronies (Ear Fetish Records, 2013)
- Together (Ear Fetish Records, 2014)
