= Brody Jenner =

American reality television personality and model

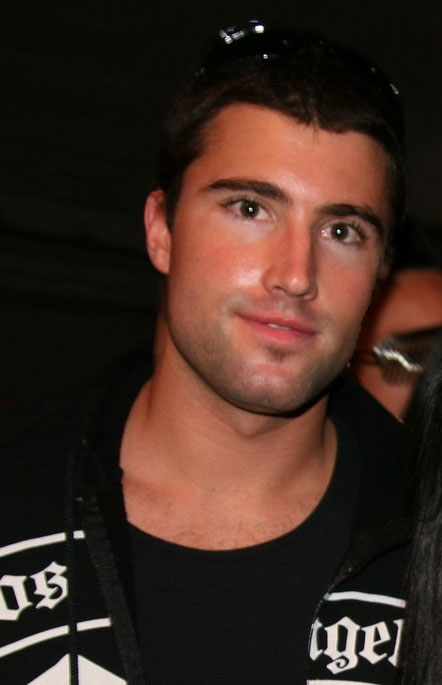
- Jenner in 2008
- Born: August 21, 1983 (age 43); Los Angeles, California, U.S.
- Occupations: Television personality; business owner; DJ
- Years active: 2005–present
- Television: The Princes of Malibu; The Hills; Bromance; Keeping Up with the Kardashians; Sex with Brody
- Spouse: Tia Blanco (m. 2025)
- Children: 2
- Parents: Caitlyn Jenner (Note: Caitlyn fathered Brody prior to her gender transition); Linda Thompson
- Relatives: Brandon Jenner (brother); Burt Jenner (half-brother); Kendall Jenner (half-sister); Kylie Jenner (half-sister)

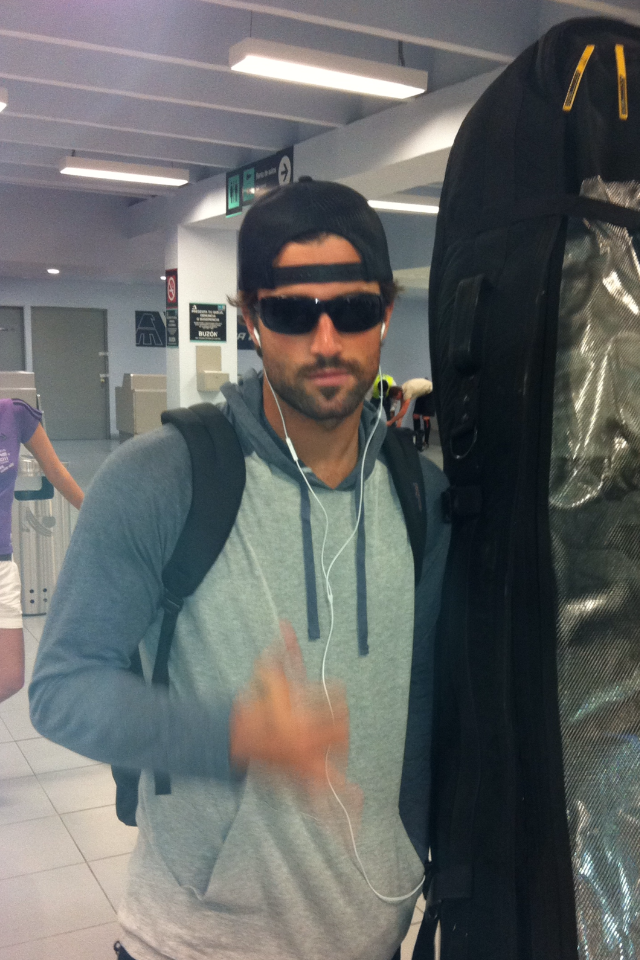
Jenner in 2011

Sam Brody Jenner (born August 21, 1983) is an American television personality, business owner and DJ from Malibu, California. He is known for his appearances in reality television series such as The Princes of Malibu, The Hills, Bromance, and Keeping Up with the Kardashians.

== Early life ==
Sam Brody Jenner was born in Los Angeles, California on August 21, 1983 to retired 1976 Summer Olympics gold medalist and reality television personality Caitlyn Jenner and actress and songwriter Linda Thompson. Jenner is the younger brother of musician and reality television personality Brandon Jenner. He also has two half-siblings, Burton "Burt" and Cassandra "Casey" Jenner, from Caitlyn's first marriage to Chrystie Crownover which lasted from 1972 until 1981.

After Jenner's parents divorced in 1986, Caitlyn Jenner remarried for the third time in 1991, to Kris Kardashian, ex-wife of attorney Robert Kardashian. Jenner became a stepbrother to Kourtney, Kim, Khloé, and Rob Kardashian. Kris went on to give birth to his younger half-sisters Kendall and Kylie Jenner in 1995 and 1997. Caitlyn and her family moved to Calabasas, California, while Jenner and his brother remained in Malibu.

Jenner's mother Linda Thompson remarried in 1991, to composer David Foster. Jenner and his brother Brandon have stated that after his father's marriage to Kris, Caitlyn became gradually less present in their life leading to them to eventually becoming estranged, and being raised by their mother and stepfather composer David Foster, who they considered their main paternal figure. They were raised in Malibu, California, and attended Crossroads School in Santa Monica. Thompson and Foster divorced in 2005 after 15 years together.

== Reality television career ==
In 2005, Jenner starred in the reality television series The Princes of Malibu alongside his brother Brandon Jenner, mother Linda Thompson, stepfather David Foster and friend Spencer Pratt. The show chronicled the Jenner brothers’ lives in Malibu.

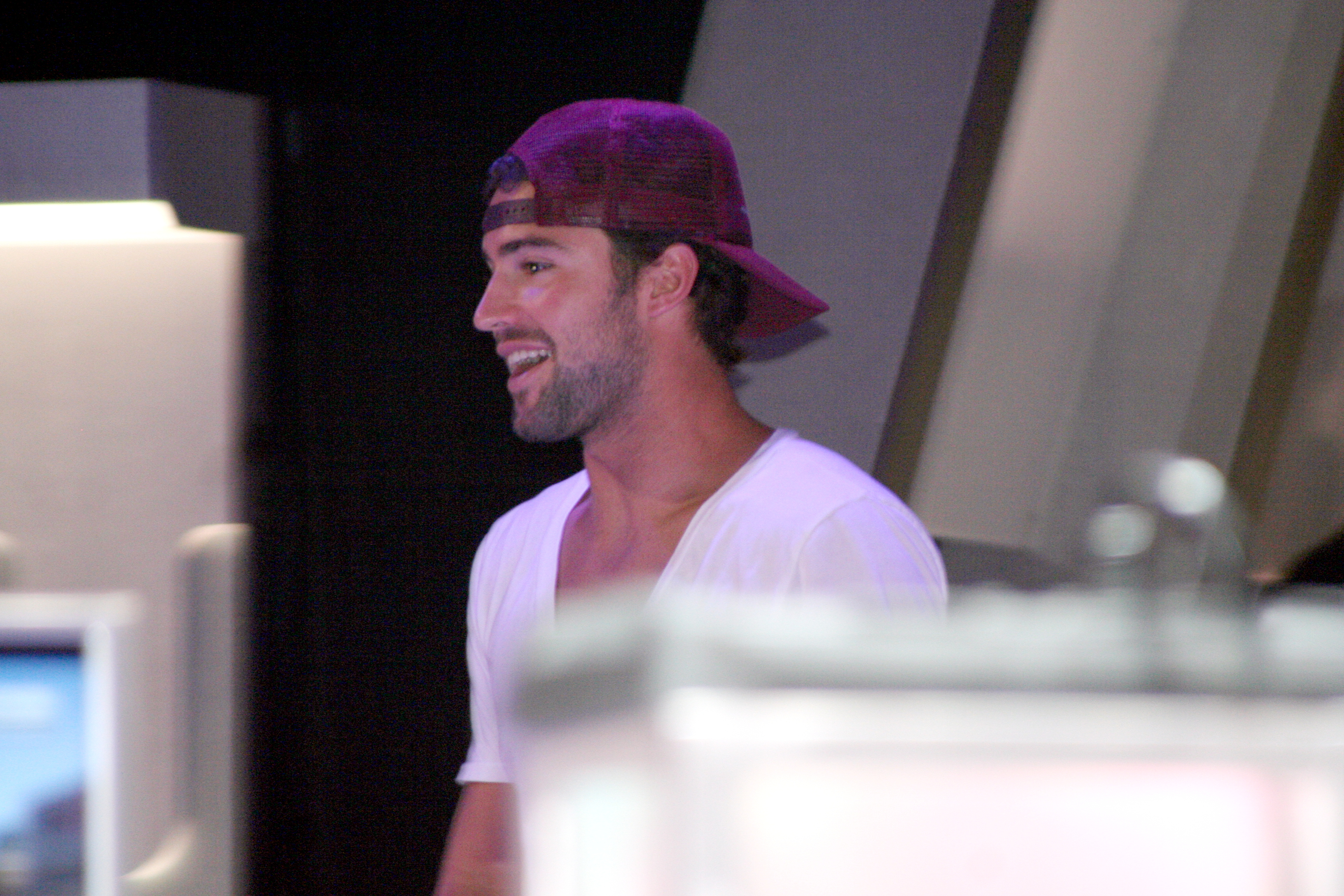
Jenner, 2008

From 2007 to 2010, Jenner was a main cast member of the hit MTV reality television series The Hills, which followed the personal lives of Jenner and his cast members Lauren Conrad, Kristin Cavallari, Heidi Montag, Spencer Pratt, Audrina Patridge, Whitney Port, Frankie Delgado.

In 2009, Jenner hosted and executive produced his own reality show, Bromance, in which young men competed to become part of his entourage.

Jenner made appearances in his stepsisters' shows Kourtney and Kim Take New York in 2011 and Keeping Up with the Kardashians in 2013.

In 2015, Jenner hosted Sex with Brody, a talk show on E! alongside actress Stevie Ryan and relationship therapist Dr. Mike Dow, where they discussed relationship topics.

In 2015, Jenner appeared in his father's Caitlyn Jenner's show I Am Cait, which chronicled her gender transition. Jenner and his father discuss their fragmented relationship growing up and make amends to build a new relationship.

From 2019 to 2021, Jenner starred in The Hills: New Beginnings. The series reunited the original cast members to document their lives living in Los Angeles.

In 2025, Jenner competed in season 3 of Special Forces: World's Toughest Test. He was one of two contestants, alongside Kayla Nicole, to survive all 10 days of selection.

== Business ventures ==
In 2020, Jenner launched Mamitas, a tequila hard seltzer company. Jenner began developing the product in 2019 with Phusion Projects, creators behind Four Loko and Basic Vodka. The company name was inspired after Mamitas Beach Club, Playa del Carmen, Mexico.

Jenner is part of producer-DJ duo BRODY X DEVIN with Devin Lucien, with whom they hold residencies in nightclubs and events across the world.

== Personal life ==
From 2005 to 2006, Jenner dated fellow The Hills costar Kristin Cavallari. From 2010 to 2012, Jenner dated Canadian singer Avril Lavigne. From 2014 to 2019, Jenner dated content creator Kaitlynn Carter. They had a commitment ceremony in Bali in 2018 but were never legally married.

In 2022, Jenner began dating professional surfer Tia Blanco after meeting in Hawaii. The couple became engaged in June 2023 during their baby shower and welcomed their daughter on July 29, 2023, in Malibu, California.

On July 12, 2025, Jenner and Blanco were married at their home in Malibu. Jenner and Blanco made their couple entrance to "Unwritten" by Natasha Bedingfield, as a nod to the groom's The Hills days. In March 2026, the couple announced they were expecting their second child due in September. Their second daughter, named Dolly Jane, was born on September 21, 2026.

== Filmography ==
Film
Year	Title	Role
2010	The Hills Live: A Hollywood Ending	Himself

Television
Year	Title	Role	Notes
2005	The Princes of Malibu	Himself	6 episodes
2007–10	The Hills	Himself	63 episodes
2008	Party Monsters: Cabo	Himself	Episode: "Brody Jenner and Frankie Delgado"
2008–09	Bromance	Host	6 episodes; also as executive producer
2011	Kourtney and Kim Take New York	Himself	Episode: "The Honeymoon Is Over"
2012	The Playboy Morning Show	Himself	Episode: "Episode #1.84"
2007–15	Keeping Up with the Kardashians	Himself	11 episodes
2015	Sex with Brody	Himself / Host	4 episodes; also as executive producer
2015	I Am Cait	Himself	Episode: "Meeting Cait"
2019, 2021	The Hills: New Beginnings	Himself	Main cast member
