= Linda Thompson =

American beauty queen, actress, and songwriter

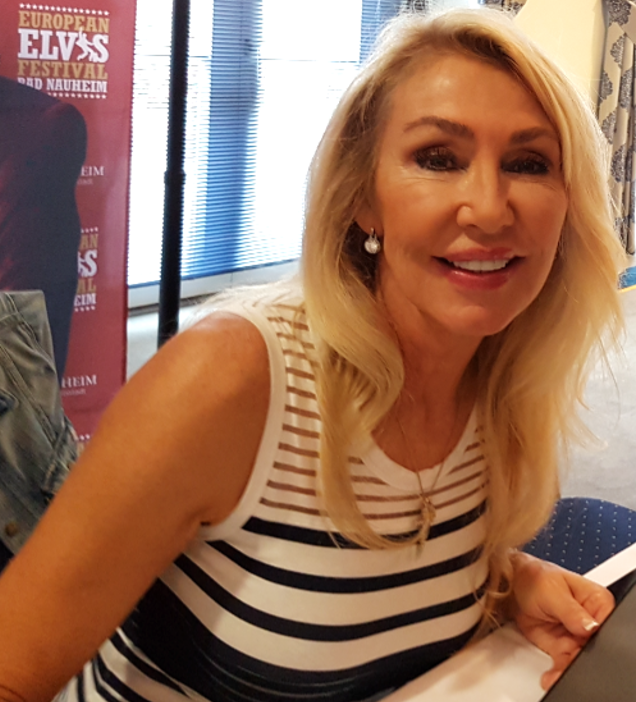
- Thompson in 2019
- Born: Linda Diane Thompson; May 23, 1950 (age 76); Memphis, Tennessee, U.S.
- Other names: Linda Jenner; Linda Foster
- Occupations: Actress; songwriter
- Years active: 1976–present
- Spouses: Bruce Jenner (Note: Jenner later transitioned to female and now uses the first name Caitlyn) (m. 1981; div. 1986) David Foster (m. 1991; div. 2005)
- Children: Brandon Jenner; Brody Jenner

Linda Diane Thompson (born May 23, 1950) is an American songwriter, former actress and beauty pageant winner.

Thompson began her acting career as a "Hee Haw Honey" on the American television variety show Hee Haw. She was also a girlfriend of Elvis Presley, before marrying Olympic decathlon champion Bruce Jenner, and later music producer David Foster.

== Early life ==
Thompson was born on May 23, 1950 in Memphis, Tennessee, the daughter of Margie (née White) and Sanford Abel Thompson. Her older brother, Sam, was one of Elvis Presley's bodyguards.

== Career ==
=== Pageants ===
In 1969 Thompson was named Miss Shelby County. In 1970, she was named "Miss Mid-South Fair" in Memphis.

Also in 1970, Thompson was named "Miss Memphis State University" and was third runner-up in the 1970 Miss Tennessee pageant.

Thompson was named Miss Tennessee in 1972.

I was Miss Tennessee. I was Miss Tennessee Universe in 1972, and Elvis was Elvis. And I was invited to go to the Memphian Theater, which he rented out after midnight to screen films. ... So, I was invited to go to the theater. And Miss Rhode Island, Jeannie LaMay, was my roommate in the Miss USA pageant. She was living in Memphis. And she and I went to the theater and were introduced to him properly.

Jeanne LeMay Dumas, Thompson's best friend, recounts this first meeting with Presley in an interview for her book, Elvis, Linda and Me" and later became Presley's personal secretary. Dumas said:

Like most people, I was a huge Elvis fan and never dreamed I'd get to meet him, much less have the experiences I ended up sharing with him and Linda. I've always in my heart felt it was fate, destiny, whatever you want to call it, that first brought me and Linda Thompson together as roommates at a beauty pageant in Puerto Rico. She was Miss Tennessee and I was Miss Rhode Island.

=== Acting ===
In 1977, Thompson became a regular on the television series Hee Haw. She later had small one-episode roles in such television series as CHiPs, Starsky & Hutch, Vega$, Fantasy Island, The Fall Guy and Beverly Hills, 90210.

Thompson starred in several television pilots, including "Mars Base One" and "Two for Two". She appeared in several films, including Three on a Meathook (1972), Rabbit Test (1978) and Original Intent (1991). She had a small role in The Bodyguard (1992).

She appeared as Linda Jenner in a workout video by then-spouse Bruce Jenner, four documentaries about Elvis Presley between 1997 and 2004, and in the short-lived Princes of Malibu, a reality series about then-husband David Foster's efforts to improve her two sons and herself.

=== Songwriting ===
She began her career as a lyricist with the Kenny Rogers single "Our Perfect Song" from his album The Heart of the Matter (1985). Thompson collaborated with composer Richard Marx on Josh Groban's first hit record, "To Where You Are", with composer Steve Dorff on the Celine Dion hit "Miracle", with Andreas Carlsson for "Drowning" by the Backstreet Boys, and composer David Foster on several compositions, including "No Explanation" for the film Pretty Woman (1990), and "I Have Nothing" for the film The Bodyguard (1992), for which they were nominated both for the Academy Award for Best Song in 1993 and the Grammy Award for Best Song Written Specifically for a Motion Picture or for Television in 1994, and "Grown-Up Christmas List".

In 1999, Linda Thompson, Clint Eastwood and Carole Bayer Sager wrote "Why Should I Care" for the film True Crime. In 2001, she wrote "Drowning" for the American boyband Backstreet Boys. In 2011, Thompson, Foster and Jackie Evancho collaborated on the title track for Evancho's album Dream With Me.

Thompson and Foster received the 2003 Emmy Award for Outstanding Music and Lyrics for "Aren't They All Our Children" for "The Concert for World Children's Day", which aired November 14, 2002.

=== Author ===
In 2016, HarperCollins imprint Dey Street Books published Thompson's memoir, A Little Thing Called Life, which featured on The New York Times Best Seller list.

== Personal life ==
=== Life with Elvis Presley ===
On July 6, 1972, Thompson attended a private movie screening hosted by Elvis Presley at the Memphian Theater in Memphis. Thompson was 22 at the time. She and Presley subsequently dated for four years before breaking up around Christmas 1976. They broke up because, like Priscilla before her, Thompson wanted a "normal" life, which was not possible with Presley's lifestyle. However, they broke up on good terms and remained good friends until Presley's death.

=== Marriage to Jenner ===
In 1980, Thompson began a relationship with Olympic gold medal decathlete Bruce Jenner prior to Jenner's transition. The couple married on January 5, 1981, in Oahu, Hawaii. They have two sons together, Brandon and Brody. The couple separated in 1986, after Jenner told her that she identified as a woman, and they eventually divorced after going through six months of counseling.

=== Marriage to David Foster ===
On June 22, 1991, Thompson married Canadian composer and record producer David Foster; they divorced in 2005.

== Honors and awards ==
Thompson won a BMI Film & TV Award in 1994 for Most Performed Song from a Film ("I Have Nothing"), composed by Thompson and David Foster for the soundtrack for The Bodyguard. She shared Special Recognition Awards in 1997 and 2004 with several others for work related to the Olympics, including lyrics for the official 1996 Olympic theme song, "The Power of the Dream", sung by Celine Dion.
