= Bromance (American TV series) =

- Genre: Reality television
- Created by: Eliot Goldberg; Jason C. Henry; Ryan Seacrest; Kathy Sutula
- Starring: Brody Jenner
- Country of origin: United States
- Original language: English
- No. of seasons: 1
- No. of episodes: 6

Production
- Executive producers: Tony DiSanto; Brody Jenner; Eric Podwell; Danny Salles; Ryan Seacrest
- Producers: Tim Andrew; MacGregor Barron; Melissa Bohman; Frankie Delgado; Rosmary Inati; Scott Miodzinski
- Editors: Welborn Ferrene; Sam Eskandari; James Gordon; John Logan; Charmain Muntean; Tim Rush; Rebecca Short; Zack Stoller
- Camera setup: Single camera
- Running time: 45–48 minutes
- Production company: Ryan Seacrest Productions

Original release
- Network: MTV
- Release: December 29, 2008 – February 2, 2009

Related
- The Hills

Bromance is an American reality television series that originally aired on MTV from December 29, 2008 until February 2, 2009. It was developed as a spin-off of The Hills, and aired one six-episode season. Considered by many to be one of the worst and most ridiculous shows in television history. The series focused on Brody Jenner, who appeared in its predecessor, and enlisted nine men to compete for the opportunity to win a close male friendship ("bromance") with him.

On February 2, 2009, it was revealed on air that Jenner had chosen Luke Verge as his new best friend. Along with Jenner's friendship and a spot in his entourage, Verge won a one year, rent-free stay in a fully furnished penthouse in downtown Los Angeles and a new Scion.

== Contestants ==
- Jacob Arenas, 21, from La Habra, California
- Femi Borisade, 23, from Jacksonville, Florida
- Chris Favis, 23, from Orlando, Florida
- Michael Flatley, 26, from Matawan, New Jersey
- Jered Getman, 22, from St. Cloud, Florida
- Chris Purcell, 21, from Louisville, Kentucky
- Alex Romanoff, 21, from Falmouth, Maine
- Gary Vaughn, 24, from Mattapoisett, Massachusetts
- Luke Verge, 22, from Medford, Massachusetts

== Call-out order ==
Order	Episodes						
Order	1	2	3	4	5	6	
1	Luke	Jered	Alex	Femi	Femi	Luke	Luke
2	Alex	Luke	Chris F.	Luke	Chris F.	Femi	Femi
3	Gary	Alex	Femi	Alex	Luke	Chris F.	
4	Chris F.	Gary	Luke	Chris F.	Alex		
5	Jered	Chris F.	Gary	Gary			
6	Femi	Femi	Jered				
7	Chris P.	Chris P.					
8	Jacob						
9	Michael						

The contestant won the competition and a "bromance" with Brody Jenner
The contestant was eliminated from the competition
The contestant won that episode's reward challenge
The contestant won a challenge that episode, but was not the team leader
The contestant won two challenges in one episode
The contestant withdrew from the competition

=== Reasons for elimination ===
Contestant	Reason for elimination	Eliminated
Michael	The show's only gay contestant, he felt he had nothing to contribute to the constant sex talk going on in the house, and was disappointed the show was not like The Hills. He withdrew before first elimination.	Episode 1
Jacob	Brody was not impressed with his toast at the lingerie party, and disliked his constant cursing.	Episode 1
Chris P.	Brody felt like he was not being himself and that the two were unable to make a connection.	Episode 2
Jered	Refused to dance during the dance-off, which led Brody to believe that he does not know how to have a good time.	Episode 3
Gary	Didn't help cook and clean during the camping trip. Brody doubted his commitment to the show and to their friendship.	Episode 4
Alex	Didn't perform well on the red carpet during the jeans challenge, which led Brody to believe that he would not be comfortable living the Hollywood lifestyle. Brody also felt that he was more invested in a friendship with Luke than a friendship with him.	Episode 5
Chris F.	Performed poorly on the lie detector test, during which he revealed he did not think Brody was "real" and would take a million dollars over Brody's friendship. Brody's mom thought he was more interested in Brody's lifestyle than being a friend to Brody.	Episode 6
Femi	During Brody's visit to his hometown, he spent a large amount of time talking about and hanging out with his cheating girlfriend. His choice to get back together with her led Brody to believe that he was more committed to his life back home than to his future in Hollywood.	Episode 6
