= Deaths in January 1998 =

The following is a list of notable deaths in January 1998.

Entries for each day are listed alphabetically by surname. A typical entry lists information in the following sequence:

- Name, age, country of citizenship at birth, subsequent country of citizenship (if applicable), reason for notability, cause of death (if known), and reference.

== January 1998 ==
=== 1 ===
- John F. Bateman, 83, American football player and coach.
- Muhamet Dibra, 74, Albanian footballer.
- Piero Filippone, 86, Italian art director.
- Jack Forsey, 84, Canadian ice hockey player (Toronto Maple Leafs).
- Dennis Hatsell, 67, English football player.
- Alfred Lagarde, 49, Dutch radio personality, stroke.
- Haxhi Lleshi, 84, Albanian military leader and communist politician.
- Xanthe Ryder, 71, British alpine skier and Olympian (1948).
- Åke Seyffarth, 78, Swedish speed skater, road cyclist and Olympian (1948).
- Helen Wills, 92, American tennis player and Olympian (1924).

=== 2 ===
- Max Colpet, 92, American writer, scriptwriter and lyricist.
- Sergei Frolov, 73, Soviet/Russian realist painter and graphic artist.
- Virginia Galante Garrone, 91, Italian writer.
- Donald McCormick, 86, British journalist and popular historian.
- Frank Muir, 77, English comedy writer and radio and television personality.
- Fred Naumetz, 75, American gridiron football player (Los Angeles Rams).
- Rell Sunn, 47, American World surfing champion, cancer.
- Nick Venet, 61, American record producer, Burkitt's lymphoma.

=== 3 ===
- Wayne Ambler, 82, American baseball player (Philadelphia Athletics).
- Essie Coffey, 56, Australian Aboriginal community leader.
- Howard Gilman, 73, American philanthropist and art collector, heart attack.
- William Russell Kelly, 92, American businessman, cancer.
- Margot Lumb, 85, English squash and tennis player.
- George Shaw, 64, American gridiron football player.
- Eugenio Soto, 88, Chilean footballer.
- Geoffrey Watson, 76, Australian statistician.

=== 4 ===
- Carlo Ludovico Bragaglia, 103, Italian film director, complications from a fall.
- Raymond Léopold Bruckberger, 90, French Dominican priest, writer, and screenwriter.
- Thomas F. Frist, Sr., 87, American physician and businessman.
- John Gary, 65, American singer, recording artist, and television host.
- Dini Haryati, 19, Indonesian student.
- Roland Kaiser, 54, German actor and voice actor.
- Ahmed Mohiuddin, 74, Pakistani scientist and scholar.
- Giuseppe Primavera, 80, Italian chess player.
- Sally Purcell, 53, British poet and translator, lymphoma of brain cells.
- Mae Questel, 89, American actress (Betty Boop), Alzheimer's disease.
- Francisco Soc Rodrigo, 83, Filipino playwright, broadcaster, lawyer and politician.
- Han Soo-ann, 71, South Korean Olympic boxer (1948, 1952).
- Rudy Sikich, 76, American gridiron football player (Cleveland Rams).
- Yusif Yusifov, 68, Soviet and Azerbaijani linguist and historian.

=== 5 ===
- Hugo Avendaño, 70, Mexican singer and actor, pancreatic cancer.
- David Bairstow, 46, English cricketer, suicide by hanging.
- Sonny Bono, 62, American singer-songwriter, actor and politician, skiing accident.
- Alik Cavaliere, 71, Italian sculptor.
- Ana Cortés, 102, Chilean painter.
- Ken Forssi, 54, American musician, brain tumor, brain cancer.
- Roy Mayne, 62, American stock car racing driver.

=== 6 ===
- Walt Barnes, 79, American football player (Philadelphia Eagles), and actor, diabetes.
- Richard Clutterbuck, 80, British army general and military historian.
- Otello Colangeli, 85, Italian film editor.
- Jack T. Conway, 80, American labor unionist.
- Alice Frost, 87, American actress.
- Victorine du Pont Homsey, 97, American architect.
- Märta Johansson, 90, Swedish Olympic diver (1924).
- Ronny Miller, 79, American baseball player (Washington Senators).
- Murray Salem, 47, American television actor and screenwriter, AIDS-related complications.
- Otto Schmitt, 84, American inventor, engineer and biophysicist.
- Georgy Sviridov, 82, Soviet and Russian composer, heart attack.

=== 7 ===
- Owen Bradley, 82, American musician and record producer.
- Roger Dean, 84, Australian politician.
- Jacqueline deWit, 85, American actress.
- Richard Hamming, 82, American mathematician, heart attack.
- Dorothy Leavey, 101, American philanthropist.
- Alva Liles, 41, American gridiron football player (Oakland Raiders, Detroit Lions).
- Slava Metreveli, 61, Soviet and Georgian football player and manager.
- Hiker Moran, 86, American baseball player (Boston Bees).
- Valerio Perentin, 88, Italian rower and Olympian (1928, 1936).
- Vladimir Prelog, 91, Croatian-born Swiss organic chemist.
- Frank Roberts, 90, British diplomat.
- Lawrence Treat, 94, American mystery writer.
- Tere Velázquez, 55, Mexican actress, colorectal cancer.
- Dorothy Wilson, 88, American film actress.

=== 8 ===
- Doug Anderson, 70, Canadian ice hockey player (Montreal Canadiens).
- Rui Araújo, 87, Portuguese footballer.
- Erwin Blasl, 86, Austrian Olympic water polo player (1936).
- Bill Corbus, 86, American gridiron football player.
- Walter Diemer, 94, American inventor of bubble gum, congestive heart failure.
- Marie-Madeleine Dienesch, 83, French politician.
- Tony Lavelli, 71, American basketball player (Boston Celtics, New York Knicks), and musician, heart attack.
- Denys Lombard, 59, French historian and sinologist.
- Akihiko Mori, 32, Japanese video game music composer, cancer.
- Max Morris, 72, American basketball and gridiron football player.
- Sam Perrin, 96, American screenwriter.
- Shamima Shaikh, 37, South African journalist and Muslim women's rights activist, breast cancer.
- Raziuddin Siddiqui, 90, Pakistan-born American physicist.
- Sir Michael Tippett, 90, English composer, pneumonia.

=== 9 ===
- Hugo Zepeda Barrios, 90, Chilean politician and lawyer.
- Paul H. Dunn, 73, American Mormon leader.
- Kenichi Fukui, 79, Japanese chemist and Nobel Prize laureate, cancer.
- Richard Graff, 60, American winemaker, plane crash.
- Alberto Isaac, 74, Mexican Olympic swimmer (1948, 1952), film director and screenwriter.
- Imi Lichtenfeld, 87, Israeli martial artist.
- Lia Manoliu, 65, Romanian discus thrower and Olympian (1952, 1956, 1960, 1964, 1968, 1972), heart attack.
- Kathleen Shannon, 62, Canadian film director and producer, lung cancer.
- Charito Solis, 62, Filipino film actress, cardiac arrest.

=== 10 ===
- Elaine Bray, 57, Australian cricketer.
- Mark Goodspeed, 41, American football player (St. Louis Cardinals).
- Deng Guangming, 90, Chinese historian, cancer.
- Wolfgang Hahn, 86, German mathematician.
- Mona May Karff, 83, American chess player.
- Victor Papanek, 74, Austrian-American designer.
- Mario Santiago Papasquiaro, 44, Mexican poet, traffic collision.
- Emilio Torres, 91, Colombian Olympic middle-distance runner (1936).
- Lars Zebroski, 56, American Olympic cyclist (1960).

=== 11 ===
- Joe Becker, 89, American baseball player (Cleveland Indians), and coach.
- Erik Jarvik, 90, Swedish paleontologist.
- Win Mortimer, 78, Canadian comic book and comic strip artist, cancer.
- Ellis Rabb, 67, American actor and director, heart failure.
- Ronald Rylance, 73, English rugby player.
- Aydan Siyavuş, 50, Turkish basketball player and coach, heart attack.
- Bedri Spahiu, 89, Albanian politician and general.
- Klaus Tennstedt, 71, German conductor, cancer.
- Georgi Vins, 69, Soviet dissident and Baptist pastor.
- John Wells, 61, English actor, writer and satirist.

=== 12 ===
- Florence Riefle Bahr, 88, American artist and activist, house fire.
- Bruce Beer, 87, Canadian politician, member of the House of Commons of Canada (1962-1972).
- Ramón Sampedro Cameán, 55, Spanish writer and euthanasia activist, assisted suicide.
- Roger Clark, 58, British rally driver, stroke.
- Kyle Dinkheller, 22, American deputy sheriff, multiple gunshot wounds.
- Chandrasekhar Gadkari, 69, Indian cricketer.
- Rajesh Joshi, 29, Indian film and theater actor.
- Mark MacGuigan, 66, Canadian academic and politician, liver cancer.
- Libuše Moníková, 52, Czech writer.
- Ian Moores, 43, English footballer, cancer.
- Phyllis Nelson, 47, American singer, breast cancer.
- Robert Townsend, 77, American businessman and author, heart attack.

=== 13 ===
- Martin Flämig, 84, German church musician.
- Jaap Helder, 90, Dutch Olympic sailor (1960).
- Mihovil Logar, 95, Yugoslav composer and music writer.
- Muslim Mulliqi, Albanian painter.
- Andrew Rutherford, 68, British educationalist.

=== 14 ===
- Safiye Ayla, 90, Turkish classical singer.
- Tony De Vita, 65, Italian composer, conductor, arranger and pianist.
- Arturo Enrile, 57, Filipino general, septic shock.
- Mohammad Ghazi, 84, Iranian writer and translator and writer, laryngeal cancer.
- René Sence, 77, French Olympic sailor (1972).
- Harry Simmons, 90, American baseball executive, writer and historian.

=== 15 ===
- John A. Anderson, 65, American football coach, heart attack.
- Hal Baylor, 79, American actor.
- Marcelline Jayakody, 95, Sri Lankan Catholic priest, musician, author, journalist.
- Gennady Kolbin, 70, Soviet politician.
- Marguerite Kuczynski, 93, German economist and literary scholar.
- Duncan McNaughton, 87, Canadian athlete and Olympian (1932).
- Gulzarilal Nanda, 99, Indian politician and economist.
- E. Jack Neuman, 76, American writer and producer.
- Ahmed Oudjani, 60, Algerian football player.
- George Pottinger, 81, British convicted fraudster.
- Boris Tatushin, 64, Soviet football player, manager, and Olympian (1956).
- Harriet Van Horne, 77, American newspaper columnist and radio/television critic, breast cancer.
- Junior Wells, 63, American blues vocalist and harmonica player, lymphoma.

=== 16 ===
- Lionel Birkett, 92, Barbadian cricketer.
- Gayane C'ebotaryan, 79, Armenian composer and musicologist.
- Hans Grünberg, 80, German Luftwaffe fighter ace during World War II.
- Dimitris Horn, 76, Greek-Austrian actor, cancer.
- Matti Kuusi, 83, Finnish folklorist, paremiographer and paremiologist.
- Greta Magnusson, 68, Swedish athlete and Olympian (1952).
- Lorenzo Mongiardino, 81, Italian architect and interior designer, pneumonia.
- Tommy Pederson, 77, American jazz trombonist and composer.
- Emil Sitka, 83, American actor, stroke.
- Luggi Waldleitner, 84, German film producer.

=== 17 ===
- Alan E. Cober, 62, American illustrator.
- Zygmunt Czyżewski, 87, Polish ice hockey and football player and manager.
- Helvi Hämäläinen, 90, Finnish writer.
- Junior Kimbrough, 67, American blues musician, heart attack.
- Luizinho, 67, Brazilian footballer.
- Joseph S. Murphy, 64, American political scientist and university administrator, traffic collision.
- Cliffie Stone, 80, American musician and radio and TV personality.
- Frank Gordon Theis, 86, American district judge (United States District Court for the District of Kansas).

=== 18 ===
- Byron Bailey, 67, American gridiron and Canadian football player (Detroit Lions, Green Bay Packers, BC Lions).
- Joan Banks, 79, American actress, lung cancer.
- Jose Calugas, 90, Filipino-American Philippine Scout and recipient of the Medal of Honor.
- Guy Charbonneau, 75, Canadian politician.
- Maria Judite de Carvalho, 76, Portuguese author.
- Monica Edwards, 85, English children's writer.
- Dan Georgiadis, 75, Greek football player and manager.
- Antoine "T.C.D." Lundy, 34, American singer, ALS.
- Gerry Ottenheimer, 63, Canadian politician.
- Benjamin Hoskins Paddock, 71, American bank robber and con man, FBI Ten Most Wanted Fugitive, heart attack.
- Skeet Quinlan, 69, American gridiron football player (Los Angeles Rams, Cleveland Browns).
- Wilhelm Törsleff, 91, Swedish Olympic sailor (1928).
- Josip Uhač, 73, Yugoslav-Croatian Apostolic nuncio.
- James Villiers, 64, English actor, cancer.
- Jan Vrolijk, 80, Dutch Olympic canoeist (1936).

=== 19 ===
- Hansruedi Bruder, 60, Swiss sprinter and Olympian (1960).
- Bengt Eklund, 73, Swedish actor.
- Tomáš Jungwirth, 55, Czech Olympic middle-distance runner (1968).
- Cornelis Kalkman, 69, Dutch botanist.
- Al Negratti, 76, American basketball player (Washington Capitols), and coach, cancer.
- David Orlikow, 79, Canadian politician, member of the House of Commons of Canada (1962-1988).
- Carl Perkins, 65, American singer-songwriter, esophageal cancer.
- Abraham Sinkov, 90, American cryptanalyst.
- DeWitt Weaver, 85, American football player and coach.
- Larisa Tarkovskaya, 64, Soviet film director and actress, lung cancer.

=== 20 ===
- Harry Ashmore, 81, American journalist.
- Bobo Brazil, 73, American professional wrestler, known as "Bobo Brazil", stroke.
- Jacob Cohen, 74, American psychologist and statistician.
- Zevulun Hammer, 61, Israeli politician, cancer.
- Maurice Kraus, 91, French cyclist.
- Emilie Schwindt, 94, Belgian Olympic fencer (1948).

=== 21 ===
- Mary Bunting, 87, American academic and college president.
- Edward Carrick, 93, English art designer, author and illustrator.
- Larry Gilbert, 55, American golfer, lung cancer.
- Pakoda Kadhar, 58, Indian actor.
- Friedrich Kessler, 96, American law professor.
- Yoshifumi Kondō, 47, Japanese animator (Kiki's Delivery Service, Princess Mononoke) and film director (Whisper of the Heart), aortic dissection.
- Donald H. LeBrun, 85, American politician.
- Jack Lord, 77, American actor (Hawaii Five-O, Dr. No, Stoney Burke), congestive heart failure.
- Ralph C. Smith, 104, United States Army officer, lung ailment.
- Louis Thiétard, 87, French cyclist.

=== 22 ===
- C. Elmer Anderson, 85, American politician.
- Edward F. Arn, 91, American lawyer and politician.
- Chilla Christ, 86, Australian cricketer.
- Hendrick Joseph Cornelius Maria de Cocq, 91, Dutch Roman Catholic bishop.
- Harold Lindsell, 84, American evangelical author and scholar.
- George Marks, 82, English football player.
- Nino Pirrotta, 89, Italian musicologist.
- Bill Sortet, 85, American gridiron football player (Pittsburgh Pirates/Steelers).

=== 23 ===
- Donald Davis, 69, Canadian actor.
- John Forbes, 47, Australian poet.
- Friedrich Josias, Prince of Saxe-Coburg and Gotha, 79, German nobleman.
- Ralf Kirsten, 67, German film director and screenwriter.
- Hilla Limann, 63, President of Ghana, diabetes.
- Roy McKasson, 58, American football player, kidney transplant complications.
- Alfredo Ormando, 39, Italian writer and gay rights activist, burns from self-immolation.
- Victor Pasmore, 89, British artist and architect.
- Ernest Peirce, 88, South African boxer and Olympian (1932).
- Manny Ramjohn, 82, Trinidadian athlete and Olympian (1948).
- Sajjad Hussain Qureshi, 101, Indian politician.
- Romuald Thomas, 75, Polish Olympic rower (1952).
- Lionel Wilson, 82, American politician, cancer.
- Mohammad Yusuf, 81, Prime Minister of Afghanistan.

=== 24 ===
- Nodar Akhalkatsi, 60, Georgian football manager, heart attack.
- Walter Bishop Jr., 70, American jazz pianist, heart attack.
- Ira Colitz, 81, American politician.
- Walter D. Edmonds, 94, American writer.
- Mirosław Justek, 49, Polish footballer.
- Bob Russell, 90, American entertainer.
- Elizabeth Sneyers, 84, Belgian lawyer and feminist.
- Stanisław Szlendak, 77, Polish ice hockey player and Olympian (1952).
- Justin Tubb, 62, American country music singer and songwriter.

=== 25 ===
- Hamid Algadri, 85, Indonesian independence pioneer.
- Olive Brasno, 80, American dwarf dancer and actress.
- Sidney Cole, 89, British film and television producer.
- Dilawar Figar, 68, Pakistani writer, poet, and humorist.
- Attia Hosain, 85, British-Indian novelist, author, journalist and actor.
- Penn Jones Jr., 83, American journalist and author..
- Fritz Langner, 85, German football player and manager.
- Roy Porter, 74, American jazz drummer.
- Carlos Alvarado Reyes, 43, Costa Rican cyclist and Olympian (1976).
- Herman Stokes, 65, American athlete and Olympian (1960).
- Attila Zoller, 70, Hungary-American jazz guitarist.

=== 26 ===
- Hogan Bassey, 65, Nigerian-British boxer.
- Lord Nicholas Hervey, 36, British aristocrat and political activist, suicide by hanging.
- Olaf Kortner, 77, Norwegian politician.
- Ethelreda Leopold, 83, American film actress, pneumonia.
- Lee Moses, 56, American R&B and soul singer and guitarist, lung cancer.
- Mario Schifano, 63, Italian painter and collagist.
- Vladimir Sevryugin, 72, Soviet Russian Olympic sports shooter (1952, 1956).
- Shin'ichi Suzuki, 99, Japanese musician, philosopher and educator.

=== 27 ===
- Sir Alan Davies, 73, British air marshal.
- Tamio Kageyama, 50, Japanese novelist, house fire.
- Elizabeth Mantell, 56, Scottish midwife and nurse.
- Assia Noris, 85, Russian-Italian film actress.
- Haider Raza, 81, Chief of Staff of the Pakistan Air Force.
- Mykola Mykolaĭovych Shcherbak, 70, Soviet-Ukrainian zoologist, ecologist, and herpetologist.
- Geoffrey Trease, 88, British writer.
- Miklos Udvardy, 78, Hungarian biologist and biogeographer.
- Joop van Woerkom, 85, Dutch Olympic water polo player (1936).

=== 28 ===
- Asbjørn Berg-Hansen, 85, Norwegian boxer and Olympian (1936).
- Louis Chaillot, 83, French cyclist and Olympian (1932, 1936).
- Bernard Joseph Flanagan, 89, American prelate of the Roman Catholic Church.
- Joe Holup, 63, American basketball player (Syracuse Nationals, Detroit Pistons).
- Shōtarō Ishinomori, 60, Japanese manga artist (Kamen Rider, Himitsu Sentai Gorenger, Cyborg 009), heart failure.
- Ken Jackson, 68, American gridiron football player (Dallas Texans, Baltimore Colts).
- Dagny Tande Lid, 94, Norwegian painter, illustrator and poet.
- Lee Ya-Ching, 85, Chinese film actress, aviator and philanthropist.
- John Morton-Finney, 108, American civil rights activist, lawyer and educator.
- Helmuth Perz, 74, Austrian Olympic long-distance runner (1952).

=== 29 ===
- Joseph Alioto, 81, American politician, Mayor of San Francisco, prostate cancer.
- Ugo Bologna, 80, Italian actor and voice actor, heart attack.
- Anna May Hutchison, 72, American baseball player.
- Karin Jonzen, 83, British figure sculptor.
- Rob Mulders, 30, Dutch road racing cyclist, traffic collision.
- Booker Robinson, 79, American baseball player.
- Ed Smith, 84, American gridiron football player (Boston Redskins, Green Bay Packers).

=== 30 ===
- Jim Barber, 85, American gridiron football player (Boston/Washington Redskins).
- Héctor Campos-Parsi, 75, Puerto Rican composer.
- Richard Cassilly, 70, American operatic tenor, cerebral hemorrhage after fall.
- Lucille Colacito, 76, American baseball player.
- Samuel Eilenberg, 84, Polish-American mathematician.
- Pappanamkodu Lakshmanan, 61, Indian film director, scriptwriter and lyricist.
- Ferdy Mayne, 81, German-British actor, Parkinson's disease.
- Lesslie Newbigin, 88, British theologian, missionary and author.
- Emmette Redford, 93, American political scientist.
- Luise Walker, 87, Austrian classical guitarist and composer.

=== 31 ===
- Greta Arwidsson, 91, Swedish archaeologist.
- Georges Combret, 91, French film director, producer and screenwriter.
- Leho Laurine, 93, Estonian chess master.
- Alice Miel, 91, American educator.
- János Somogyi, 76, Hungarian Olympic racewalker (1956).
- Antonie Straeteman, 90, French Olympic gymnast (1928).
- Karol Stryja, 82, Polish conductor and teacher.
