= 1971 European Athletics Championships – Women's discus throw =

Women's discus throw at the European Athletics Championships

The women's discus throw at the 1971 European Athletics Championships was held in Helsinki, Finland, at Helsinki Olympic Stadium on 11 and 12 August 1971.

== Medalists ==
Gold	Faina Melnik; Soviet Union
Silver	Liesel Westermann; West Germany
Bronze	Lyudmila Muravyova; Soviet Union

== Results ==
=== Final ===
12 August

Rank	Name	Nationality	Result	Notes
1st place, gold medalist(s)	Faina Melnik	Soviet Union	64.22	WR
2nd place, silver medalist(s)	Liesel Westermann	West Germany	61.68	
3rd place, bronze medalist(s)	Lyudmila Muravyova	Soviet Union	59.48	
4	Argentina Menis	Romania	59.04	
5	Tamara Danilova	Soviet Union	58.28	
6	Olimpia Cataramă	Romania	57.22	
7	Anni Mickler	East Germany	57.00	
8	Christine Spielberg	East Germany	56.20	
9	Jolán Kleiber	Hungary	55.06	
10	Brigitte Berendonk	West Germany	54.48	
11	Judit Abaházi	Hungary	51.88	
12	Rosemary Payne	Great Britain	50.20	

=== Qualification ===
11 August

Rank	Name	Nationality	Result	Notes
1	Tamara Danilova	Soviet Union	57.52	Q
2	Lyudmila Muravyova	Soviet Union	56.84	Q
3	Argentina Menis	Romania	56.38	Q
4	Jolán Kleiber	Hungary	56.12	Q
5	Liesel Westermann	West Germany	55.94	Q
6	Brigitte Berendonk	West Germany	55.24	Q
7	Olimpia Cataramă	Romania	55.16	Q
8	Faina Melnik	Soviet Union	54.58	q
9	Judit Abaházi	Hungary	54.56	q
10	Anni Mickler	East Germany	53.76	q
11	Christine Spielberg	East Germany	53.44	q
12	Rosemary Payne	Great Britain	52.98	q
13	Lia Manoliu	Romania	52.26	
14	Judit Bognár	Hungary	52.12	
15	Karin Illgen	East Germany	50.60	
16	Despina Kafenidou	Greece	47.30	

== Participation ==
According to an unofficial count, 16 athletes from 7 countries participated in the event.

- East Germany (3)
- Greece (1)
- Hungary (3)
- Romania (3)
- Soviet Union (3)
- Great Britain (1)
- West Germany (2)
