= Athletics at the 1968 Summer Olympics – Women's discus throw =

Women's discus throw at the Games of the XIX Olympiad
- Venue: Estadio Olímpico Universitario
- Date: October 18, 1968
- Competitors: 15 from 8 nations
- Winning distance: 58.28 OR

Medalists
1st place, gold medalist(s)		Lia Manoliu; Romania
2nd place, silver medalist(s)		Liesel Westermann; West Germany
3rd place, bronze medalist(s)		Jolán Kleiber-Kontsek; Hungary

The Women's discus throw competition at the 1968 Summer Olympics in Mexico City, Mexico took place on October 18.

== Competition format ==
The competition consisted of a single final round. Each athlete is allowed three throws, with the top eight athletes after that point being given three further attempts.

== Records ==
Prior to the competition, the existing World and Olympic records were as follows.

World record	Liesel Westermann (FRG)	62.54 m	Werdohl, West Germany	August 24, 1968
Olympic record	Tamara Press (URS)	57.27 m	Tokyo, Japan	October 19, 1964

== Results ==
Rank	Name	Nationality	#1	#2	#3	#4	#5	#6	Result	Notes
1st place, gold medalist(s)	Lia Manoliu	Romania	58.28	X	–	X	46.82	X	58.28	OR
2nd place, silver medalist(s)	Liesel Westermann	West Germany	54.02	57.76	X	55.78	X	X	57.76	
3rd place, bronze medalist(s)	Jolán Kleiber-Kontsek	Hungary	54.90	54.24	X	X	X	X	54.90	
4	Anita Otto	East Germany	54.40	54.10	53.88	X	51.16	52.34	54.40	
5	Antonina Popova	Soviet Union	53.42	53.12	51.40	52.60	52.86	X	53.42	
6	Olga Fikotová	United States	X	52.96	50.74	X	X	50.40	52.96	
7	Christine Spielberg	East Germany	52.86	X	52.86	X	52.62	49.80	52.86	
8	Brigitte Berendonk	West Germany	52.80	49.66	46.90	X	X	50.46	52.80	
9	Lyudmila Muravyova	Soviet Union	51.80	52.26	50.20	—N/a			52.26	
10	Karin Illgen	East Germany	50.40	X	52.18	—N/a			52.18	
11	Judit Stugner	Hungary	42.12	51.38	52.08	—N/a			52.08	
12	Dashzevgiin Namjilmaa	Mongolia	50.76	X	49.00	—N/a			50.76	
13	Olimpia Cataramă	Romania	X	47.50	50.20	—N/a			50.20	
14	Carol Moseke	United States	48.28	44.78	44.04	—N/a			48.28	
15	Jean Roberts	Australia	36.56	46.26	X	—N/a			46.26	
	Mary McNeil	Jamaica				—N/a			DNS	
	Judit Bognár	Hungary				—N/a			DNS	
