= Athletics at the 1965 Summer Universiade – Women's discus throw =

The women's discus throw event at the 1965 Summer Universiade was held at the People's Stadium in Budapest on 29 August 1965.

== Results ==
Rank	Name	Nationality	Result	Notes
1st place, gold medalist(s)	Jolán Kleiber	Hungary	55.66	
2nd place, silver medalist(s)	Judit Stugner	Hungary	55.14	
3rd place, bronze medalist(s)	Tamara Press	Soviet Union	53.62	
4	Olimpia Cataramă	Romania	51.82	
5	Danuta Damek	Poland	43.74	
6	Brigitte Berendonk	West Germany	43.72	
7	Jadwiga Wojtczak	Poland	43.32	
