= Athletics at the 1964 Summer Olympics – Women's discus throw =

Women's discus throw at the Games of the XVIII Olympiad
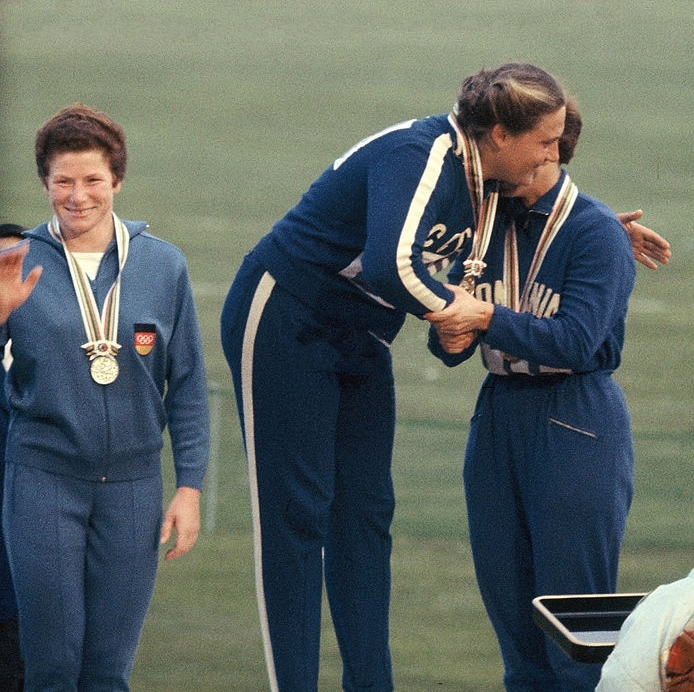
- Venue: Olympic Stadium
- Date: 19 October 1964
- Competitors: 22 from 15 nations
- Winning distance: 57.27 OR

Medalists
1st place, gold medalist(s)		Tamara Press; Soviet Union
2nd place, silver medalist(s)		Ingrid Lotz; United Team of Germany
3rd place, bronze medalist(s)		Lia Manoliu; Romania

The women's discus throw was one of three women's throwing events on the Athletics at the 1964 Summer Olympics program in Tokyo. It was held on 19 October 1964. 22 athletes from 15 nations entered, with 1 not starting in the qualification round.

== Results ==
=== Qualification ===
The qualification standard was 50.00 metres. Each thrower had three attempts to reach that standard.

Place	Athlete	Nation	Best mark	Throw 1	Throw 2	Throw 3
1	Virzhiniya Mikhaylova	Bulgaria	54.94	54.94	—	
2	Ingrid Lotz	United Team of Germany	54.82	48.38	54.82	—
3	Kriemhild Limberg	United Team of Germany	54.54	46.59	48.63	54.54
4	Lia Manoliu	Romania	53.64	47.80	53.64	—
5	Olimpia Cataramă	Romania	53.20	46.96	53.20	—
6	Olga Connolly	United States	53.17	49.99	53.17	—
7	Yevgeniya Kuznetsova	Soviet Union	52.44	49.40	52.44	—
8	Jolán Kleiber-Kontsek	Hungary	52.35	52.35	—	
9	Judit Stugner	Hungary	52.30	48.96	48.49	52.30
10	Valerie Young	New Zealand	51.94	48.01	51.94	—
11	Doris Lorenz	United Team of Germany	51.58	51.58	—	
12	Jiřina Němcová	Czechoslovakia	50.64	50.64	—	
13	Tamara Press	Soviet Union	50.28	50.28	—	
14	Nina Ponomaryova	Soviet Union	50.18	44.69	44.89	50.18
15	Nancy McCredie	Canada	47.27	44.91	47.27	44.75
16	Hiroko Uchida-Yokoyama	Japan	47.18	46.19	47.18	34.48
17	Dashzevgiin Namjilmaa	Mongolia	44.55	43.37	40.26	44.55
18	Josephine de la Viña	Philippines	42.27	40.05	42.27	41.71
19	Pranee Kitipongpitaya	Thailand	38.73	36.21	38.73	34.20
20	Park Yeong-suk	South Korea	37.50	37.50	33.27	34.97
21	Juliette Geverkof	Iran	30.05	X	30.05	X
—	Judit Bognár	Hungary	DNS	—		

=== Final ===
The marks for the qualification were ignored in the final. Each thrower had three attempts; the top six after those three received three more and counted their best mark of the six. All five of the top throwers defeated the old Olympic record.

Place	Athlete	Nation	Best mark	Throw 1	Throw 2	Throw 3	Throw 4	Throw 5	Throw 6
1	Tamara Press	Soviet Union	57.27 OR	X	55.38	50.38	55.23	57.27	56.08
2	Ingrid Lotz	United Team of Germany	57.21	57.21	X	55.41	X	54.59	54.74
3	Lia Manoliu	Romania	56.97	55.90	X	X	56.09	56.97	X
4	Virzhiniya Mikhaylova	Bulgaria	56.70	47.38	56.56	52.19	56.70	55.77	55.54
5	Yevgeniya Kuznetsova	Soviet Union	55.17	55.17	53.58	X	X	X	53.80
6	Jolán Kleiber-Kontsek	Hungary	54.87	54.46	53.05	53.51	53.14	54.87	51.69
7	Kriemhild Limberg	United Team of Germany	53.81	48.35	53.81	53.02			
8	Olimpia Catarama	Romania	53.08	53.08	49.99	51.28			
9	Jiřina Němcová	Czechoslovakia	52.80	49.06	52.80	51.13			
10	Judit Stugner	Hungary	52.52	50.88	50.47	52.52			
11	Nina Ponomariova	Soviet Union	52.48	52.15	51.12	52.48			
12	Olga Connolly	United States	51.58	51.21	X	51.58			
13	Valerie Young	New Zealand	49.59	48.93	46.17	49.59			
14	Doris Lorenz	United Team of Germany	45.63	X	X	45.63			
