= 1969 European Athletics Championships – Women's discus throw =

Women's discus throw at the European Athletics Championships

The women's discus throw at the 1969 European Athletics Championships was held in Athens, Greece, at Georgios Karaiskakis Stadium on 19 September 1969.

== Medalists ==
Gold	Tamara Danilova; Soviet Union
Silver	Lyudmila Muravyova; Soviet Union
Bronze	Karin Illgen; East Germany

== Results ==
=== Final ===
19 September

Rank	Name	Nationality	Result	Notes
1st place, gold medalist(s)	Tamara Danilova	Soviet Union	59.28	CR
2nd place, silver medalist(s)	Lyudmila Muravyova	Soviet Union	59.24	
3rd place, bronze medalist(s)	Karin Illgen	East Germany	58.66	
4	Lia Manoliu	Romania	57.38	
5	Antonina Popova	Soviet Union	56.66	
6	Olimpia Cataramă	Romania	56.62	
7	Gabriele Hinzmann	East Germany	52.32	
8	Judit Stugner	Hungary	52.00	
9	Rosemary Payne	Great Britain	50.30	

== Participation ==
According to an unofficial count, 9 athletes from 5 countries participated in the event.

- East Germany (2)
- Hungary (1)
- Romania (2)
- Soviet Union (3)
- Great Britain (1)
