= 1966 European Athletics Championships – Women's discus throw =

Women's discus throw at the European Athletics Championships

The women's discus throw at the 1966 European Athletics Championships was held in Budapest, Hungary, at Népstadion on 31 August and 1 September 1966.

== Medalists ==
Gold	Christine Spielberg; East Germany
Silver	Liesel Westermann; West Germany
Bronze	Anita Hentschel; East Germany

== Results ==
=== Final ===
1 September

Rank	Name	Nationality	Result	Notes
1st place, gold medalist(s)	Christine Spielberg	East Germany	57.76	CR
2nd place, silver medalist(s)	Liesel Westermann	West Germany	57.38	NR
3rd place, bronze medalist(s)	Anita Hentschel	East Germany	56.80	
4	Jolán Kleiber	Hungary	56.24	
5	Verzhinia Mikhailova	Bulgaria	53.68	
6	Ingrid Lotz	East Germany	53.34	
7	Jiřina Němcová	Czechoslovakia	52.40	
8	Štěpánka Mertová	Czechoslovakia	51.64	
9	Lyudmila Shcherbakova	Soviet Union	50.56	
10	Judit Stugner	Hungary	49.96	
11	Kriemhild Limberg	West Germany	49.20	
12	Elivia Ricci	Italy	48.80	

=== Qualification ===
31 August

Rank	Name	Nationality	Result	Notes
1	Liesel Westermann	West Germany	56.42	Q
2	Lyudmila Shcherbakova	Soviet Union	55.96	Q
3	Christine Spielberg	East Germany	53.94	Q
4	Štěpánka Mertová	Czechoslovakia	53.52	Q
5	Jolán Kleiber	Hungary	53.28	Q
6	Judit Stugner	Hungary	53.12	Q
7	Anita Hentschel	East Germany	52.10	Q
8	Kriemhild Limberg	West Germany	52.02	Q
9	Ingrid Lotz	East Germany	51.60	Q
10	Verzhinia Mikhailova	Bulgaria	51.56	Q
11	Elivia Ricci	Italy	51.46	Q
12	Jiřina Němcová	Czechoslovakia	49.66	Q
13	Lia Manoliu	Romania	49.44	
14	Pina Thani	Albania	42.12	

== Participation ==
According to an unofficial count, 14 athletes from 9 countries participated in the event.

- Albania (1)
- Bulgaria (1)
- Czechoslovakia (2)
- East Germany (3)
- Hungary (2)
- Italy (1)
- Romania (1)
- Soviet Union (1)
- West Germany (2)
