= Athletics at the 1972 Summer Olympics – Women's discus throw =

Women's discus throw at the Games of the XX Olympiad
- Venue: Olympic Stadium
- Dates: September 9 & September 10, 1972
- Competitors: 17 from 10 nations
- Winning throw: 66.62 OR

Medalists
1st place, gold medalist(s)		Faina Melnik; Soviet Union
2nd place, silver medalist(s)		Argentina Menis; Romania
3rd place, bronze medalist(s)		Vasilka Stoeva; Bulgaria

The women's discus throw field event at the 1972 Olympic Games took place on September 9 & September 10. Armenia Soviet Faina Melnik was the strong favorite to win the gold. She has broken the world record five times since 1971 as well as being the European Champion in the same year. But twice in 1972 she had been beaten by Romanian Argentina Menis. Menis took the lead in round one breaking the Olympic record throw of 64.28 m (210 ft 10 1/2 in). In the start of the fourth round Menis lead with Melnik in fifth. Menis then improved her distance to 65.06 m (213 ft 5 1/2 in). Melnike threw next and overtook Menis with a throw of 66.62 m (218 ft 7 in) which held on to win the gold. Thirteen days later, Menis broke Melnik's world record with a throw of 67.32 m (220 ft 10 1/2 in).

== Records ==
Standing records prior to the 1972 Summer Olympics
World record	Faina Melnik (URS)	66.76 m	July 4, 1972	Moscow, Soviet Union
Olympic record	Lia Manoliu (ROM)	58.28 m	October 18, 1968	Mexico City, Mexico
Broken records during the 1972 Summer Olympics
Olympic record	Faina Melnik (URS)	66.62 m	September 10, 1972	Munich, West Germany

== Results ==
All throwers reaching 55.00 m (180 ft 5 1/2 in) and the top 12 including ties, advanced to the finals. All qualifiers are shown in blue. All distances are listed in metres.

=== Qualifying ===
Rank	Name	Nationality	Mark	1st throw	2nd throw	3rd throw
1	Argentina Menis	Romania	61.58; OR	61.58	p	p
2	Faina Melnik	Soviet Union	61.26	53.00	61.26	p
3	Tamara Danilova	Soviet Union	60.34	60.34	p	p
4	Gabriele Hinzmann	East Germany	59.80	59.80	p	p
5	Liesel Westermann	West Germany	58.26	58.26	p	p
6	Carmen Ionescu	Romania	57.82	x	57.82	p
7	Brigitte Berendonk	West Germany	56.90	54.74	56.90	p
8	Svetla Bozhkova	Bulgaria	56.42	54.52	56.42	p
9	Lia Manoliu	Romania	55.88	55.88	p	p
10	Rosemary Payne	Great Britain	55.56	x	53.56	55.56
11	Vasilka Stoeva	Bulgaria	55.26	x	55.26	p
12	Lyudmila Muravyova	Soviet Union	55.24	55.24	p	p
13	Josephine de la Viña	Philippines	53.29	51.08	x	53.29
14	Radostina Vasekova	Bulgaria	53.86	x	x	53.86
15	Krystyna Nadolna	Poland	52.52	x	47.42	52.52
16	Olga Connolly	United States	51.58	51.58	x	50.76
17	Maggy Wauters	Belgium	49.62	49.62	x	x
–	Ok-Ja Paik	South Korea	DNS			
–	Jolán Kleiber-Kontsek	Hungary	DNS			
–	Rosa Molina	Chile	DNS			

=== Final ===
Rank	Name	Nationality	Mark	1st throw	2nd throw	3rd throw	4th throw	5th throw	6th throw
1st place, gold medalist(s)	Faina Melnik	Soviet Union	66.62; OR	60.56	61.32	57.96	66.62; OR	62.76	x
2nd place, silver medalist(s)	Argentina Menis	Romania	65.06	64.28; OR	59.82	60.88	65.06; OR	63.78	64.90
3rd place, bronze medalist(s)	Vasilka Stoeva	Bulgaria	64.34	61.08	x	64.20	62.24	64.34	62.10
4	Tamara Danilova	Soviet Union	62.86	62.64; OR	58.14	62.86	61.14	x	x
5	Liesel Westermann	West Germany	62.18	x	57.04	62.18	61.66	x	x
6	Gabriele Hinzmann	East Germany	61.72	57.52	59.14	60.12	61.08	61.72	60.22
7	Carmen Ionescu	Romania	60.42	57.78	58.76	57.06	59.08	x	60.42
8	Lyudmila Muravyova	Soviet Union	59.00	57.52	57.92	59.00	x	58.86	57.20
9	Lia Manoliu	Romania	58.50	58.18	58.50	x			
10	Svetla Bozhkova	Bulgaria	56.72	56.50	56.72	x			
11	Brigitte Berendonk	West Germany	56.58	55.60	x	56.58			
12	Rosemary Payne	Great Britain	56.50	56.50	x	52.26			

Key: OR = Olympic record; p = pass; x = fault; NM = no mark
