= 1962 European Athletics Championships – Women's discus throw =

Women's discus throw at the European Athletics Championships

The women's discus throw at the 1962 European Athletics Championships was held in Belgrade, then Yugoslavia, at JNA Stadium on 15 September 1962.

== Medalists ==
Gold	Tamara Press; Soviet Union
Silver	Doris Müller; East Germany
Bronze	Jolán Kontsek; Hungary

== Results ==
=== Final ===
15 September

Rank	Name	Nationality	Result	Notes
1st place, gold medalist(s)	Tamara Press	Soviet Union	56.91	CR
2nd place, silver medalist(s)	Doris Müller	East Germany	53.60	
3rd place, bronze medalist(s)	Jolán Kontsek	Hungary	52.82	
4	Antonina Zolotukhina	Soviet Union	51.78	
5	Jiřina Němcová	Czechoslovakia	51.58	
6	Nina Ponomaryova	Soviet Union	51.03	
7	Kriemhild Hausmann	West Germany	50.16	
8	Štěpánka Mertová	Czechoslovakia	49.15	
9	Kazimiera Rykowska	Poland	48.00	
10	Verzhinia Mikhailova	Bulgaria	47.91	
11	Zyta Mojek	Poland	47.61	
12	Judit Bognár	Hungary	47.12	

=== Qualification ===
15 September

Rank	Name	Nationality	Result	Notes
1	Tamara Press	Soviet Union	51.27	Q
2	Kriemhild Hausmann	West Germany	50.70	Q
3	Nina Ponomaryova	Soviet Union	50.16	Q
4	Jolán Kontsek	Hungary	49.74	Q
5	Štěpánka Mertová	Czechoslovakia	49.51	Q
6	Doris Müller	East Germany	49.26	Q
7	Jiřina Němcová	Czechoslovakia	48.92	Q
8	Verzhinia Mikhailova	Bulgaria	48.67	Q
9	Zyta Mojek	Poland	48.46	Q
10	Antonina Zolotukhina	Soviet Union	48.28	Q
11	Judit Bognár	Hungary	48.26	Q
12	Kazimiera Rykowska	Poland	48.14	Q
13	Dorli Hofrichter	Austria	45.80	
14	Lia Manoliu	Romania	45.02	
15	Suzanne Allday	Great Britain	43.66	
16	Sofia Leriou	Greece	41.25	
17	Vania Veleva	Bulgaria	39.88	
	Hella Ulbricht	East Germany	NM	

== Participation ==
According to an unofficial count, 18 athletes from 11 countries participated in the event.

- Austria (1)
- Bulgaria (2)
- Czechoslovakia (2)
- East Germany (2)
- Greece (1)
- Hungary (2)
- Poland (2)
- Romania (1)
- Soviet Union (3)
- Great Britain (1)
- West Germany (1)
