= Athletics at the 1960 Summer Olympics – Women's discus throw =

Women's discus throw at the Games of the XVII Olympiad
- Venue: Olympic Stadium
- Dates: September 3, 1960 (qualifying round); September 5, 1960 (final round)
- Competitors: 24 from 10 nations
- Winning distance: 55.10 OR

Medalists
| 1st place, gold medalist(s) | | Nina Romashkova; Soviet Union |
| 2nd place, silver medalist(s) | | Tamara Press; Soviet Union |
| 3rd place, bronze medalist(s) | | Lia Manoliu; Romania |

The women's discus throw throwing event at the 1960 Olympic Games took place on September 3 & September 5.

== Results ==
Top 12 throwers and ties plus all throwers reaching 47.00 metres advanced to the finals. All distances are listed in metres.

=== Qualifying ===
| Rank | Name | Nationality | Mark | 1 | 2 | 3 | Notes |
|---|---|---|---|---|---|---|---|
| 1 | Nina Romashkova | Soviet Union | 53.68 | 53.68 | – | – | |
| 2 | Irene Schuch | United Team of Germany | 52.22 | 52.22 | – | – | |
| 3 | Tamara Press | Soviet Union | 51.47 | 51.47 | – | – | |
| 4 | Earlene Brown | United States | 51.17 | 42.43 | 51.17 | – | |
| 5 | Kriemhild Limberg | United Team of Germany | 50.86 | 50.86 | – | – | |
| 6 | Jiřina Němcová | Czechoslovakia | 49.86 | 49.86 | – | – | |
| 7 | Yevgeniya Kuznetsova | Soviet Union | 49.36 | 49.36 | – | – | |
| 8 | Štěpánka Mertová | Czechoslovakia | 49.34 | 49.34 | – | – | |
| 9 | Lia Manoliu | Romania | 48.57 | 48.57 | – | – | |
| 10 | Olga Fikotová | United States | 48.32 | x | 48.32 | – | |
| 11 | Wivianne Bergh | Sweden | 47.02 | x | 44.29 | 47.02 | |
| 12 | Valerie Sloper | New Zealand | 46.91 | 46.91 | 45.79 | 42.80 | |
| 13 | Kazimiera Rykowska | Poland | 46.75 | x | 46.75 | x | |
| 14 | Jennifer Thompson | New Zealand | 46.74 | 45.94 | 46.74 | 42.93 | |
| 15 | Elivia Ricci | Italy | 45.86 | 45.86 | x | 45.78 | |
| 16 | Dorli Hofrichter | Austria | 44.94 | 44.94 | x | 39.26 | |
| 17 | Karen Inge Halkier | Denmark | 43.99 | 41.06 | 42.02 | 43.99 | |
| 18 | Hiroko Uchida-Yokoyama | Japan | 43.78 | x | 43.78 | x | |
| 19 | Pam Kurrell | United States | 43.23 | 43.23 | 40.35 | 42.34 | |
| 20 | Paola Paternoster | Italy | 43.11 | 43.11 | 41.36 | 42.20 | |
| 21 | Suzanne Farmer | Great Britain | 41.12 | x | x | 41.12 | |
| 22 | Milena Čelesnik | Yugoslavia | 30.84 | x | 30.84 | x | |
| | Doris Lorenz-Müller | United Team of Germany | NM | x | x | x | |
| | Wu Jin-Yun | Formosa | NM | x | x | x | |
| | Judit Bognár | Hungary | DNS | | | | |

=== Final ===
| Rank | Name | Nationality | Mark | 1 | 2 | 3 | 4 | 5 | 6 | Notes |
|---|---|---|---|---|---|---|---|---|---|---|
| 1st place, gold medalist(s) | Nina Romashkova | Soviet Union | 55.10 | 44.48 | 52.42 | 53.39 | 51.68 | 55.10 OR | 54.42 | OR |
| 2nd place, silver medalist(s) | Tamara Press | Soviet Union | 52.59 | 51.64 | 46.82 | x | 50.92 | x | 52.59 | |
| 3rd place, bronze medalist(s) | Lia Manoliu | Romania | 52.36 | 52.36 | x | 46.29 | 50.59 | 48.78 | 46.96 | |
| 4 | Kriemhild Limberg | United Team of Germany | 51.47 | 51.47 | x | 45.30 | 47.40 | 48.12 | 46.38 | |
| 5 | Yevgeniya Kuznetsova | Soviet Union | 51.43 | 51.43 | 51.39 | 50.96 | 49.69 | 50.62 | 51.25 | |
| 6 | Earlene Brown | United States | 51.29 | 51.29 | 35.83 | 47.29 | x | 35.20 | 45.80 | |
| 7 | Olga Fikotová | United States | 50.95 | 50.95 | 47.46 | 48.82 | | | | |
| 8 | Jiřina Němcová | Czechoslovakia | 50.12 | 50.12 | 48.62 | x | | | | |
| 9 | Irene Schuch | United Team of Germany | 49.86 | 49.86 | 49.42 | x | | | | |
| 10 | Valerie Sloper | New Zealand | 48.81 | 45.26 | x | 48.81 | | | | |
| 11 | Štěpánka Mertová | Czechoslovakia | 48.28 | 48.28 | 46.62 | 38.51 | | | | |
| 12 | Wivianne Bergh | Sweden | 43.96 | 42.70 | 43.76 | 43.96 | | | | |

Key: OR = Olympic record; NM = no mark
