= 1958 European Athletics Championships – Women's discus throw =

Women's discus throw at the European Athletics Championships

The women's discus throw at the 1958 European Athletics Championships was held in Stockholm, Sweden, at Stockholms Olympiastadion on 20 and 22 August 1958.

== Medalists ==
Gold	Tamara Press; Soviet Union
Silver	Štěpánka Mertová; Czechoslovakia
Bronze	Kriemhild Hausmann; West Germany

== Results ==
=== Final ===
22 August

Rank	Name	Nationality	Result	Notes
1st place, gold medalist(s)	Tamara Press	Soviet Union	52.32	CR
2nd place, silver medalist(s)	Štěpánka Mertová	Czechoslovakia	52.19	
3rd place, bronze medalist(s)	Kriemhild Hausmann	West Germany	50.99	
4	Irina Beglyakova	Soviet Union	50.87	
5	Irene Schuch	East Germany	49.94	
6	Doris Müller	East Germany	49.32	
7	Helena Dmowska	Poland	47.81	
8	Antonina Zolotukhina	Soviet Union	46.60	
9	Kazimiera Sobocińska	Poland	45.94	
10	Suzanne Allday	Great Britain	45.41	
11	Elivia Ricci	Italy	45.11	
12	Dorli Hofrichter	Austria	44.75	
13	Verzhinia Mikhailova	Bulgaria	42.76	
14	Simone Saenen	Belgium	39.82	
15	Anni Pöll	Austria	39.44	

=== Qualification ===
20 August

Rank	Name	Nationality	Result	Notes
1	Štěpánka Mertová	Czechoslovakia	49.36	CR Q
2	Irina Beglyakova	Soviet Union	49.06	Q
3	Doris Müller	East Germany	47.32	Q
4	Helena Dmowska	Poland	45.98	Q
5	Elivia Ricci	Italy	45.59	Q
6	Irene Schuch	East Germany	45.26	Q
7	Tamara Press	Soviet Union	44.78	Q
8	Kriemhild Hausmann	West Germany	44.77	Q
9	Verzhinia Mikhailova	Bulgaria	44.76	Q
10	Antonina Zolotukhina	Soviet Union	44.55	Q
11	Suzanne Allday	Great Britain	43.21	Q
12	Dorli Hofrichter	Austria	43.13	Q
13	Anni Pöll	Austria	42.84	Q
14	Kazimiera Sobocińska	Poland	42.57	Q
15	Simone Saenen	Belgium	42.08	Q
16	Karin-Inge Halkier	Denmark	41.54	
17	Gretel Bolliger	Switzerland	36.61	
18	Sofia Leriou	Greece	39.96	

== Participation ==
According to an unofficial count, 18 athletes from 13 countries participated in the event.

- Austria (2)
- Belgium (1)
- Bulgaria (1)
- Czechoslovakia (1)
- Denmark (1)
- East Germany (2)
- Greece (1)
- Italy (1)
- Poland (2)
- Soviet Union (3)
- Switzerland (1)
- Great Britain (1)
- West Germany (1)
