= Tamara Danilova =

Russian discus thrower

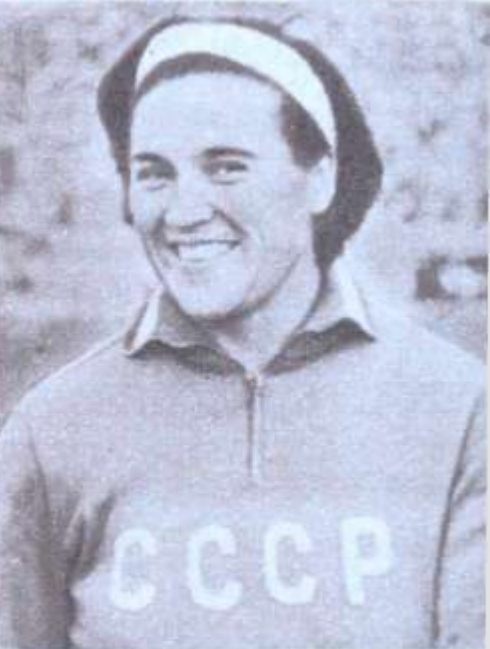

Personal information
- Born: July 30, 1939 (age 86) Leningrad, Russian SFSR, Soviet Union
- Height: 174 cm (5 ft 9 in)
- Weight: 76 kg (168 lb)

Sport
- Sport: Athletics
- Events: Discus throw, javelin throw

Achievements and titles
- Personal bests: DT – 62.86 m (1972); JT – 52.93 m (1961)
Medal record
Women's athletics
Representing Soviet Union
European Championships
Gold medal – first place	1969 Athens	Discus throw

Tamara Petrovna Danilova (Russian: Тамара Петровна Данилова, born July 30, 1939) is a Russian discus thrower who won the European title in 1969. She placed fifth at the 1971 European Championships and fourth at the 1972 Summer Olympics, both times losing to the world record holder Faina Melnik. In the Olympic final Danilova set a new Olympic record at 62.64 m, surpassing the record of Argentina Menis set in the qualifying round two days earlier. Her record was beaten two throws later by Menis, and then by Melnyk.

Melnyk would later go on to set the masters world record in the W35 division eight years later just after the Moscow Olympics. Danilova had to wait another sixteen years after the fall of the Soviet Union before she set her first masters world record, in the W55 division in 1996. That record of 43.36 m still stands. Later Danilova set the W65 (37.62 m), W70 (33.55 m) and W75 (31.56 m) world records that also still stand.
