= 1974 European Athletics Championships – Women's discus throw =

Women's discus throw at the European Athletics Championships

The women's discus throw at the 1974 European Athletics Championships was held in Rome, Italy, at Stadio Olimpico on 6 September 1974.

== Medalists ==
Gold	Faina Melnik; Soviet Union
Silver	Argentina Menis; Romania
Bronze	Gabriele Hinzmann; East Germany

== Results ==
=== Final ===
6 September

Rank	Name	Nationality	Result	Notes
1st place, gold medalist(s)	Faina Melnik	Soviet Union	69.00	CR
2nd place, silver medalist(s)	Argentina Menis	Romania	64.62	
3rd place, bronze medalist(s)	Gabriele Hinzmann	East Germany	62.50	
4	Mariya Petkova	Bulgaria	61.92	
5	Karin Höldtke	East Germany	58.92	
6	Olimpia Cataramă	Romania	58.30	
7	Liesel Westermann	West Germany	57.40	
8	Vasilka Stoyeva	Bulgaria	57.12	
9	Helena Vyhnalova	Czechoslovakia	55.24	
10	Svetla Bozhkova	Bulgaria	54.28	
11	Rosemary Payne	Great Britain	49.16	

== Participation ==
According to an unofficial count, 11 athletes from 7 countries participated in the event.

- Bulgaria (3)
- Czechoslovakia (1)
- East Germany (2)
- Romania (2)
- Soviet Union (1)
- Great Britain (1)
- West Germany (1)
