= Athletics at the 1976 Summer Olympics – Women's discus throw =

Women's discus throw at the Games of the XXI Olympiad
- Venue: Olympic Stadium
- Date: 28 July 1976 (qualifications); 29 July 1976 (final)
- Competitors: 15 from 9 nations
- Winning distance: 69.00 OR

Medalists
1st place, gold medalist(s)		Evelin Schlaak; East Germany
2nd place, silver medalist(s)		Mariya Vergova; Bulgaria
3rd place, bronze medalist(s)		Gabriele Hinzmann; East Germany

The Women's discus throw competition at the 1976 Summer Olympics in Montreal was held on 28–29 July.

== Records ==
Prior to the competition, the existing world and Olympic records were as follows:

World record	Faina Melnik (URS)	70.52 m.	Sochi, Soviet Union	24 June 1976
Olympic record	Faina Melnik (URS)	66.62 m.	Munich, West Germany	10 September 1972

This following new Olympic record was set during the competition:

Date	Athlete	Country	Distance	OR	WR	29 July	Evelin Schlaak	69.00 m.	OR

== Results ==
=== Qualification ===
The qualification distance was set to 55.00 metres.

Rank	Name	Nationality	#1	#2	#3	Result	Note
1	Gabriele Hinzmann	East Germany	65.12			65.12	Q
2	Faina Melnik	Soviet Union	63.74			63.74	Q
3	Carmen Romero	Cuba	63.40			63.40	Q
4	Evelin Schlaak	East Germany	61.86			61.86	Q
5	María Cristina Betancourt	Cuba	61.46			61.46	Q
6	Natalya Gorbachova	Soviet Union	59.84			59.84	Q
7	Argentina Menis	Romania	59.56			59.56	Q
8	Olga Andrianova	Soviet Union	51.72	58.66		58.66	Q
9	Jane Haist	Canada	52.96	57.98		57.98	Q
10	Mariya Vergova	Bulgaria	57.96			57.96	Q
~~11~~	Danuta Rosani	Poland	x	57.78		~~57.78~~	DQ
11	Sabine Engel	East Germany	56.94			56.94	Q
12	Rita Pfister	Switzerland	55.94			55.94	Q
13	Lucette Moreau	Canada	51.56	54.12	55.22	55.22	Q
14	Lynne Winbigler	United States	x	48.22	46.96	48.22	

=== Final ===
Rank	Name	Nationality	#1	#2	#3	#4	#5	#6	Result	Notes
1st place, gold medalist(s)	Evelin Schlaak	East Germany	69.00	66.80	66.12	x	61.24	64.80	69.00	OR
2nd place, silver medalist(s)	Mariya Vergova	Bulgaria	62.22	67.30	60.44	59.86	62.70	x	67.30	
3rd place, bronze medalist(s)	Gabriele Hinzmann	East Germany	66.68	66.10	66.84	66.24	66.32	x	66.84	
4	Faina Melnik	Soviet Union	64.48	65.42	62.76	66.40	x	64.20	66.40	
5	Sabine Engel	East Germany	x	61.18	65.46	65.88	64.92	61.18	65.88	
6	Argentina Menis	Romania	62.82	62.50	63.70	64.14	65.38	63.48	65.38	
7	María Cristina Betancourt	Cuba	61.28	60.24	63.86	59.58	58.28	61.24	63.86	
8	Natalya Gorbachova	Soviet Union	63.02	60.98	62.24	x	63.46	x	63.46	
9	Carmen Romero	Cuba	60.90	59.90	61.18				61.18	
10	Olga Andrianova	Soviet Union	60.80	56.18	59.90				60.80	
11	Jane Haist	Canada	59.74	x	x				59.74	
12	Rita Pfister	Switzerland	x	56.72	57.24				57.24	
13	Lucette Moreau	Canada	55.88	x	53.00				55.88	
	Danuta Rosani	Poland							DNS	
