= Athletics at the 1965 Summer Universiade – Women's shot put =

The women's shot put event at the 1965 Summer Universiade was held at the People's Stadium in Budapest on 28 August 1965.

== Results ==
Rank	Name	Nationality	Result	Notes
1st place, gold medalist(s)	Tamara Press	Soviet Union	18.31	UR
2nd place, silver medalist(s)	Nadezhda Chizhova	Soviet Union	17.27	
3rd place, bronze medalist(s)	Judit Bognár	Hungary	15.37	
4	Ludmila Jamborová	Czechoslovakia	14.71	
5	Brigitte Berendonk	West Germany	14.63	
6	Judit Mikuss	Hungary	14.56	
