= Athletics at the 1967 Summer Universiade – Women's shot put =

The women's shot put event at the 1967 Summer Universiade was held at the National Olympic Stadium in Tokyo on 4 September 1967.

== Results ==
Rank	Name	Nationality	Result	Notes
1st place, gold medalist(s)	Liesel Westermann	West Germany	15.30	
2nd place, silver medalist(s)	Ryoko Sugiyama	Japan	15.04	
3rd place, bronze medalist(s)	Brigitte Berendonk	West Germany	14.36	
4	Noriko Takada	Japan	14.07	
5	Liese Prokop	Austria	13.65	
6	Lynne Parry	Australia	13.35	
7	Iris Malnig	Austria	11.84	
