= Athletics at the 1967 Summer Universiade – Women's discus throw =

The women's discus throw event at the 1967 Summer Universiade was held at the National Olympic Stadium in Tokyo on 4 September 1967.

== Results ==
Rank	Name	Nationality	Result	Notes
1st place, gold medalist(s)	Liesel Westermann	West Germany	59.22	
2nd place, silver medalist(s)	Brigitte Berendonk	West Germany	53.61	
3rd place, bronze medalist(s)	Iris Malnig	Austria	48.20	
4	Noriko Takada	Japan	45.90	
5	Atsuko Okudaira	Japan	45.58	
6	Lynne Parry	Australia	36.12	
