= Women's discus throw world record progression =

The first world record in the women's discus throw was recognized by the International Association of Athletics Federations in 1923. As of 2013, 55 world records have been ratified by the IAAF in the event.

== World record progression ==
Ratified
Not ratified
Ratified but later rescinded

Mark	Athlete	Location	Date
24.90 m (81 ft 8 1/4 in)	Lilli Henoch (GER)	Berlin	1 October 1922
26.62 m (87 ft 4 in)	Lilli Henoch (GER)	Berlin	8 July 1923
27.39 m (89 ft 10 1/4 in)	Yvonne Tembouret (FRA)	Paris	23 September 1923
27.70 m (90 ft 10 1/2 in)	Lucie Petit (FRA)	Paris	14 July 1924
28.325 m (92 ft 11 in)	Lucie Petit-Daigré (BEL)	Brussels	21 July 1924
30.225 m (99 ft 1 3/4 in)	Lucienne Velu (FRA)	Paris	14 September 1924
31.15 m (102 ft 2 1/4 in)	Maria Vidlaková (TCH)	Prague	11 October 1925
34.15 m (112 ft 1/4 in)	Halina Konopacka (POL)	Warsaw	23 May 1926
38.34 m (125 ft 9 1/4 in)	Milly Reuter (GER)	Braunschweig, Germany	22 August 1926
39.18 m (128 ft 6 1/2 in)	Halina Konopacka (POL)	Warsaw	4 September 1927
39.62 m (129 ft 11 3/4 in)	Halina Konopacka (POL)	Amsterdam	31 July 1928
40.345 m (132 ft 4 1/4 in)	Jadwiga Wajs (POL)	Pabianice, Poland	15 May 1932
40.39 m (132 ft 6 in)	Jadwiga Wajs (POL)	Łódź, Poland	16 May 1932
40.84 m (133 ft 11 3/4 in)	Grete Heublein (GER)	Hagen, Germany	19 Jun 1932
42.43 m (139 ft 2 1/4 in)	Jadwiga Wajs (POL)	Łódź, Poland	19 June 1932
43.08 m (141 ft 4 in)	Jadwiga Wajs (POL)	Królewska Huta, Poland	15 July 1933
43.795 m (143 ft 8 in)	Jadwiga Wajs (POL)	London	11 August 1934
44.34 m (145 ft 5 1/2 in)	Gisela Mauermayer (GER)	Ulm, Germany	2 June 1935
44.76 m (146 ft 10 in)	Gisela Mauermayer (GER)	Nuremberg, Germany	4 June 1935
45.53 m (149 ft 4 1/2 in)	Gisela Mauermayer (GER)	Munich	23 June 1935
46.10 m (151 ft 2 3/4 in)	Gisela Mauermayer (GER)	Jena, Germany	29 June 1935
47.12 m (154 ft 7 in)	Gisela Mauermayer (GER)	Dresden, Germany	25 August 1935
48.31 m (158 ft 5 3/4 in)	Gisela Mauermayer (GER)	Berlin	11 July 1936
53.25 m (174 ft 8 1/4 in)	Nina Dumbadze (URS)	Moscow	8 August 1948
53.37 m (175 ft 1 in)	Nina Dumbadze (URS)	Gori, Soviet Union	27 May 1951
53.61 m (175 ft 10 1/2 in)	Nina Romashkova (URS)	Odessa, Soviet Union	9 August 1952
57.04 m (187 ft 1 1/2 in)	Nina Dumbadze (URS)	Tbilisi, Soviet Union	18 October 1952
57.15 m (187 ft 6 in)	Tamara Press (URS)	Rome	12 September 1960
57.43 m (188 ft 5 in)	Tamara Press (URS)	Moscow	15 July 1961
58.06 m (190 ft 5 3/4 in)	Tamara Press (URS)	Sofia, Bulgaria	1 September 1961
58.98 m (193 ft 6 in)	Tamara Press (URS)	London	20 September 1961
59.29 m (194 ft 6 1/4 in)	Tamara Press (URS)	Moscow	18 May 1963
59.70 m (195 ft 10 1/4 in)	Tamara Press (URS)	Moscow	11 August 1965
61.26 m (200 ft 11 3/4 in)	Liesel Westermann (FRG)	São Paulo, Brazil	5 November 1967
61.64 m (202 ft 2 3/4 in)	Christine Spielberg (GDR)	Regis-Breitingen, East Germany	26 May 1968
62.54 m (205 ft 2 in)	Liesel Westermann (FRG)	Werdohl, West Germany	24 July 1968
62.70 m (205 ft 8 1/2 in)	Liesel Westermann (FRG)	East Berlin, East Germany	18 June 1969
63.96 m (209 ft 10 in)	Liesel Westermann (FRG)	Hamburg, West Germany	27 September 1969
64.22 m (210 ft 8 1/4 in)	Faina Melnik (URS)	Helsinki	12 August 1971
64.88 m (212 ft 10 1/4 in)	Faina Melnik (URS)	Munich	4 September 1971
65.42 m (214 ft 7 1/2 in)	Faina Melnik (URS)	Moscow	31 May 1972
65.48 m (214 ft 9 3/4 in)	Faina Melnik (URS)	Augsburg, West Germany	24 June 1972
66.76 m (219 ft 1/4 in)	Faina Melnik (URS)	Moscow	4 August 1972
67.32 m (220 ft 10 1/4 in)	Argentina Menis (ROU)	Constanța, Romania	23 September 1972
67.44 m (221 ft 3 in)	Faina Melnik (URS)	Riga, Soviet Union	25 May 1973
67.58 m (221 ft 8 1/2 in)	Faina Melnik (URS)	Moscow	10 July 1973
69.48 m (227 ft 11 1/4 in)	Faina Melnik (URS)	Edinburgh	7 September 1973
69.90 m (229 ft 3 3/4 in)	Faina Melnik (URS)	Prague	27 May 1974
70.20 m (230 ft 3 3/4 in)	Faina Melnik (URS)	Zurich	20 August 1975
70.50 m (231 ft 3 1/2 in)	Faina Melnik (URS)	Sochi, Soviet Union	24 April 1976
70.72 m (232 ft 1/4 in)	Evelin Jahl (GDR)	Dresden, East Germany	12 August 1978
71.50 m (234 ft 6 3/4 in)	Evelin Jahl (GDR)	Potsdam, East Germany	10 May 1980
71.80 m (235 ft 6 3/4 in)	Mariya Petkova (BUL)	Sofia, Bulgaria	13 July 1980
73.26 m (240 ft 4 1/4 in)	Galina Savinkova (URS)	Leselidze, Soviet Union	22 May 1983
73.36 m (240 ft 8 in)	Irina Meszynski (GDR)	Prague	17 August 1984
74.56 m (244 ft 7 1/4 in)	Zdeňka Šilhavá (TCH)	Nitra, Czechoslovakia	26 August 1984
76.80 m (251 ft 11 1/2 in)	Gabriele Reinsch (GDR)	Neubrandenburg, East Germany	9 July 1988

== See also ==
- Men's discus throw world record progression
