= Anita Otto =

East German discus thrower

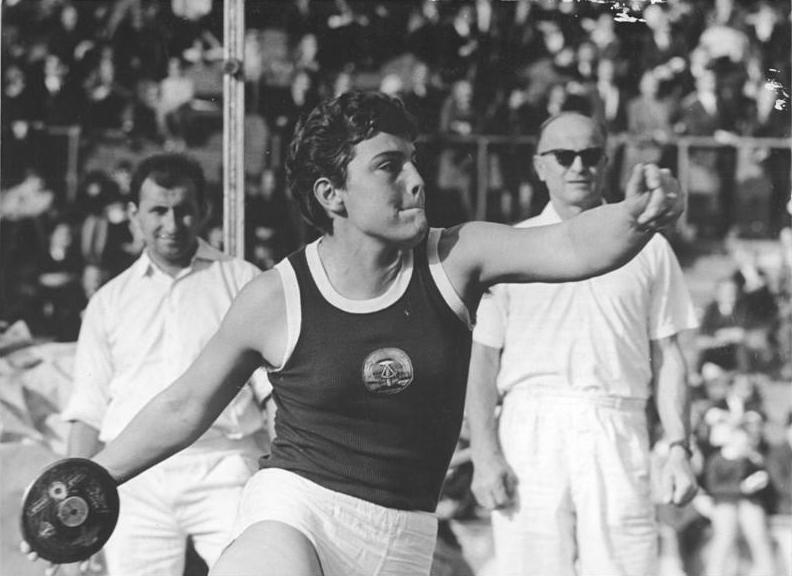

Personal information
- Born: 12 December 1942 Löbnitz, Germany
- Died: 18 April 2019 (aged 76)
- Height: 177 cm (5 ft 10 in)
- Weight: 88 kg (194 lb)

Sport
- Event: Discus throw
Medal record
Women's athletics
Representing East Germany
European Championships
Bronze medal – third place	1966 Budapest	Discus throw

Anita Otto (née Hentschel, 12 December 1942 – 18 April 2019) was a German discus thrower. Representing East Germany, she won bronze in women's discus at the 1966 European Athletics Championships and placed fourth at the 1968 Summer Olympics.

== Career ==
Otto was East German champion in 1965 (56.20 m) and 1966 (57.84 m), both of her winning marks being new meeting records. At the 1966 European Championships in Budapest she placed third behind her teammate Christine Spielberg and West Germany's Liesel Westermann with a throw of 56.80 m.

Otto placed fourth at the 1968 Summer Olympics in Mexico City, only throwing 54.40 m in rainy conditions and missing out on a medal by half a metre.

Czechoslovak sports statistician Jan Popper ranked Otto in the world's top five in women's discus throw every year from 1965 to 1968, and ninth in the world in 1969.
