= Athletics at the 1964 Summer Olympics – Women's shot put =

Women's shot put at the Games of the XVIII Olympiad
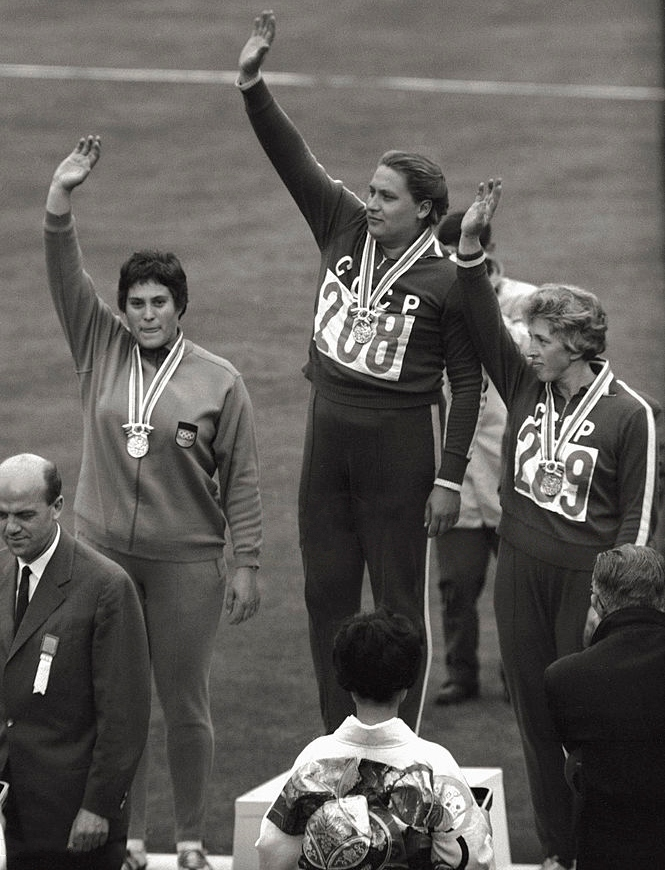
- Medal winners
- Venue: Olympic Stadium
- Date: 20 October 1964
- Competitors: 17 from 12 nations
- Winning distance: 18.14 OR

Medalists
1st place, gold medalist(s)		Tamara Press	Soviet Union
2nd place, silver medalist(s)		Renate Culmberger	United Team of Germany
3rd place, bronze medalist(s)		Galina Zybina	Soviet Union

Official Video Highlights

The women's shot put was one of three women's throwing events on the Athletics at the 1964 Summer Olympics program in Tokyo. It was held on 20 October 1964. 17 athletes from 12 nations entered, with 1 not starting the qualification round.

== Results ==
=== Qualification ===
The qualification standard was 15.00 metres. Each thrower had three attempts to reach that standard.

Place	Athlete	Nation	Best mark	Throw 1	Throw 2	Throw 3
1	Tamara Press	Soviet Union	16.57	16.57	—	
2	Valerie Young	New Zealand	16.40	16.40	—	
3	Renate Culmberger	United Team of Germany	16.32	16.32	—	
4	Irina Press	Soviet Union	15.67	15.67	—	
5	Margitta Helmbold	United Team of Germany	15.61	15.61	—	
6	Judit Bognár	Hungary	15.52	14.44	15.52	—
7	Earlene Brown	United States	15.44	13.84	14.67	15.44
8	Johanna Hübner	United Team of Germany	15.38	15.38	—	
9	Ana Sălăgean	Romania	15.31	15.31	—	
10	Ivanka Khristova	Bulgaria	15.24	15.24	—	
11	Galina Zybina	Soviet Union	15.17	15.17	—	
12	Nancy McCredie	Canada	15.10	15.10	—	
13	Jolán Kleiber-Kontsek	Hungary	14.52	14.48	14.39	14.52
14	Mary Elizabeth Peters	Great Britain	14.46	13.44	X	14.46
15	Seiko Obonai	Japan	13.70	13.70	13.47	12.70
16	Juliette Geverkof	Iran	9.17	X	8.79	9.17
—	Namjilmaa Dashzeveg	Mongolia	Did not start	—		

=== Final ===
The scores from the qualification were ignored, each thrower having three fresh attempts. The top six after those three received three more, taking their best throw from the six.

Place	Athlete	Nation	Best mark	Throw 1	Throw 2	Throw 3	Throw 4	Throw 5	Throw 6
1	Tamara Press	Soviet Union	18.14 OR	17.51	17.72	17.18	16.49	X	18.14
2	Renate Culmberger	United Team of Germany	17.61	17.41	17.10	16.38	17.61	17.00	17.01
3	Galina Zybina	Soviet Union	17.45	17.38	17.25	17.45	17.42	16.65	17.36
4	Valerie Young	New Zealand	17.26	17.08	15.84	16.81	17.26	17.24	17.23
5	Margitta Helmbold	United Team of Germany	16.91	16.67	15.87	X	16.60	16.91	16.34
6	Irina Press	Soviet Union	16.71	X	16.50	X	15.81	15.78	16.71
7	Nancy McCredie	Canada	15.89	15.89	15.13	15.27			
8	Ana Sălăgean	Romania	15.83	15.79	15.83	15.70			
9	Johanna Hubner	United Team of Germany	15.77	15.77	X	X			
10	Ivanka Khristova	Bulgaria	15.69	15.69	X	15.35			
11	Judit Bognar	Hungary	15.65	15.65	X	X			
12	Earlene Brown	United States	14.80	14.25	13.43	14.80			
