= Hatsell =

Hatsell is a surname. Notable people with the surname include:

- Dennis Hatsell (1930–1998), English footballer
- Henry Hatsell (died 1667), English naval official and member of parliament
- John Hatsell (1733–1820), English civil servant
