= Yevgeniya Kuznetsova =

Yevgeniya Kuznetsova is the name of

- Yevgeniya Kuznetsova (athlete) (born 1936), Soviet discus thrower
- Evgeniya Kuznetsova (born 1980), Bulgarian gymnast of Russian descent
