= Park Yeong-suk =

Park Yeong-suk or Pak Yŏng-suk (박영숙) may refer to:

- Park Yeong-suk (discus thrower) (born 1947), South Korean athlete
- Youngsook Park (born 1955), South Korean writer
- Park Young-sook (born 1988), South Korean table tennis player
