= W70 at the 2014 European Masters Athletics Championships =

The nineteenth European Masters Athletics Championships were held in Izmir, Turkey, from August 22–31, 2014. The European Masters Athletics Championships serve the division of the sport of athletics for people over 35 years of age, referred to as masters athletics.

== Results ==
=== 100 metres ===
Pos	Athlete	Country	Results
1st place, gold medalist(s)	Helgard Houben	Germany	16.99
2nd place, silver medalist(s)	Kerstin Nilsson	Sweden	17.58
3rd place, bronze medalist(s)	Ingrid Holzknecht	Germany	17.66

=== 200 metres ===
Pos	Athlete	Country	Results
1st place, gold medalist(s)	Marianne Maier	Austria	33.63
2nd place, silver medalist(s)	Hannelore Venn	Germany	36.50
3rd place, bronze medalist(s)	Sirkka-Liisa Ruuskanen	Finland	37.07

=== 400 metres ===
Pos	Athlete	Country	Results
1st place, gold medalist(s)	Inkeri Janhunen	Finland	1:24.20
2nd place, silver medalist(s)	Hannelore Venn	Germany	1:28.25

=== 800 metres ===
Pos	Athlete	Country	Results
1st place, gold medalist(s)	Inkeri Janhunen	Finland	3:11.22
2nd place, silver medalist(s)	Rigmor Osterlund	Denmark	3:11.40

=== 1500 metres ===
Pos	Athlete	Country	Results
1st place, gold medalist(s)	Rigmor Osterlund	Denmark	6:39.33
2nd place, silver medalist(s)	Inkeri Janhunen	Finland	6:44.73
3rd place, bronze medalist(s)	Maria Joaquina Flores	Portugal	7:17.36

=== 5000 metres ===
Pos	Athlete	Country	Results
1st place, gold medalist(s)	Rigmor Osterlund	Denmark	24:55.10
2nd place, silver medalist(s)	Maria Joaquina Flores	Portugal	25:39.79
3rd place, bronze medalist(s)	Eva Carlsen	Norway	31:39.53

=== 10000 metres ===
Pos	Athlete	Country	Results
1st place, gold medalist(s)	Maria Joaquina Flores	Portugal	52:53.57

=== 80 metres hurdles ===
Pos	Athlete	Country	Results
1st place, gold medalist(s)	Marianne Maier	Austria	15.97
2nd place, silver medalist(s)	Sirkka-Liisa Ruuskanen	Finland	18.63
3rd place, bronze medalist(s)	Kerstin Nilsson	Sweden	19.89

=== 200 metres hurdles ===
Pos	Athlete	Country	Results
1st place, gold medalist(s)	Sirkka-Liisa Ruuskanen	Finland	41.62
2nd place, silver medalist(s)	Kerstin Nilsson	Sweden	46.13
3rd place, bronze medalist(s)	Nelli Tomilova	Russia	46.33

=== 4×100 metres relay ===
Pos	Athletes	Country	Results
1st place, gold medalist(s)	Helgard Houben	Germany	1:09.86
1st place, gold medalist(s)	Hannelore Venn	Germany	1:09.86
1st place, gold medalist(s)	Vroni Lay	Germany	1:09.86
1st place, gold medalist(s)	Ingrid Holzknecht	Germany	1:09.86
2nd place, silver medalist(s)	Marjatta Taipale	Finland	1:11.38
2nd place, silver medalist(s)	Inkeri Janhunen	Finland	1:11.38
2nd place, silver medalist(s)	Irma Nieme-Pynttari	Finland	1:11.38
2nd place, silver medalist(s)	Sirkka-Liisa Ruuskanen	Finland	1:11.38

=== Marathon ===
Pos	Athlete	Country	Results
1st place, gold medalist(s)	Oline Lovise Yksnoey	Norway	5:07:56

=== High jump ===
Pos	Athlete	Country	Results
1st place, gold medalist(s)	Sirkka-Liisa Ruuskanen	Finland	1.17
2nd place, silver medalist(s)	Marianne Maier	Austria	1.14
3rd place, bronze medalist(s)	Kirsten Onsberg	Denmark	1.08

=== Long jump ===
Pos	Athlete	Country	Results
1st place, gold medalist(s)	Marianne Maier	Austria	3.75
2nd place, silver medalist(s)	Vroni Lay	Germany	3.25
3rd place, bronze medalist(s)	Kerstin Nilsson	Sweden	3.15

=== Triple jump ===
Pos	Athlete	Country	Results
1st place, gold medalist(s)	Helgard Houben	Germany	7.24
2nd place, silver medalist(s)	Grethe Maren Myklestad	Norway	6.37
3rd place, bronze medalist(s)	Seija Sario	Finland	5.88

=== Shot put ===
Pos	Athlete	Country	Results
1st place, gold medalist(s)	Marianne Maier	Austria	10.54
2nd place, silver medalist(s)	Karin Illgen	Germany	7.32
3rd place, bronze medalist(s)	Adelhei Graber-Bolliger	Switzerland	8.48

=== Discus throw ===
Pos	Athlete	Country	Results
1st place, gold medalist(s)	Maria Luisa Fancello	Italy	26.26
2nd place, silver medalist(s)	Ingrid Holzknecht	Germany	23.81
3rd place, bronze medalist(s)	Adelhei Graber-Bolliger	Switzerland	23.56

=== Hammer throw ===
Pos	Athlete	Country	Results
1st place, gold medalist(s)	Gudrun Mellmann	Germany	31.10
2nd place, silver medalist(s)	Maria Luisa Fancello	Italy	30.33
3rd place, bronze medalist(s)	Brunella del Giudice	Italy	27.62

=== Javelin throw ===
Pos	Athlete	Country	Results
1st place, gold medalist(s)	Adelhei Graber-Bolliger	Switzerland	23.98
2nd place, silver medalist(s)	Ingrid Holzknecht	Germany	23.56
3rd place, bronze medalist(s)	Christa Helmke	Germany	22.53

=== Weight throw ===
Pos	Athlete	Country	Results
1st place, gold medalist(s)	Brunella Del Giudice	Italy	11.69
2nd place, silver medalist(s)	Ingrid Holzknecht	Germany	11.03
3rd place, bronze medalist(s)	Helvi Erikson	Estonia	10.32

=== Throws pentathlon ===
Pos	Athlete	Country	Results
1st place, gold medalist(s)	Maria Luisa Fancello	Italy	4418
2nd place, silver medalist(s)	Ingrid Holzknecht	Germany	4287
3rd place, bronze medalist(s)	Brunella del Giudice	Italy	4038

=== Heptathlon ===
Pos	Athlete	Country	Results
1st place, gold medalist(s)	Marianne Maier	Austria	6218
2nd place, silver medalist(s)	Sirkka-Liisa Ruuskanen	Finland	4884
3rd place, bronze medalist(s)	Kateryna Shvedova	Ukraine	4135

=== 5000 metre track race walk ===
Pos	Athlete	Country	Results
1st place, gold medalist(s)	Heidi Maeder	Switzerland	31:44.85
2nd place, silver medalist(s)	Gisela Theunissen	Germany	36:08.21
3rd place, bronze medalist(s)	Vera Grinberte	Latvia	36:20.43

=== 10000 metre road race walk ===
Pos	Athlete	Country	Results
1st place, gold medalist(s)	Heidi Maeder	Switzerland	1:07:32
2nd place, silver medalist(s)	Gisela Theunissen	Germany	1:15:21
3rd place, bronze medalist(s)	Vera Grinberte	Latvia	1:16:45
