= Rogienice, Masovian Voivodeship =

Rogienice
- Village
- Location within Poland
- Coordinates: 52°45′N 19°47′E
- Country: Poland
- Voivodeship: Masovian
- County: Sierpc
- Gmina: Gozdowo
- Time zone: UTC+1 (CET)
  - Summer (DST): UTC+2 (CEST)
- Vehicle registration: WSE

Rogienice [rɔɡʲɛˈnit͡sɛ] is a village in the administrative district of Gmina Gozdowo, within Sierpc County, Masovian Voivodeship, in north-central Poland.

== Notable people ==
- Kazimiera Rykowska (1933–2012), discus thrower, Olympian
