= Kazimiera Rykowska =

Polish discus thrower

Personal information
- Nationality: Polish
- Born: 27 March 1933 Rogienice, Poland
- Died: 28 July 2018 (aged 85) Warsaw, Poland
- Height: 1.70 m (5 ft 7 in)
- Weight: 76 kg (168 lb)

Sport
- Sport: Athletics
- Event: Discus throw
- Club: CWKS Legia Warsaw (1953–1961); Gwardia Warsaw (1963–1968)
- Coached by: Andrzej Biliński

Kazimiera Rykowska, née Sobocińska (27 March 1933 – 28 July 2012) was a Polish athlete. She competed in the women's discus throw at the 1960 Summer Olympics.

== International competitions ==
Year	Competition	Venue	Position	Event	Notes
Representing Poland
1958	European Championships	Stockholm, Sweden	9th	Discus throw	45.94 m
1960	Olympic Games	Rome, Italy	13th (q)	Discus throw	46.75 m
1962	European Championships	Belgrade, Yugoslavia	9th	Discus throw	48.00 m
1965	European Cup Final	Kassel, West Germany	5th	Discus throw	50.50 m

== Personal bests ==
- Shot put – 13.72 (Spała 1964)
- Discus throw – 53.90 (Warsaw 1966)
- Javelin throw – 41.15 (Bielsko 1960)
