= Masters W55 discus world record progression =

Masters W55 discus world record progression is the progression of world record improvements of the discus W55 division of Masters athletics. Records must be set in properly conducted, official competitions under the standing IAAF rules unless modified by World Masters Athletics. The W55 division consists of female athletes who have reached the age of 55 but have not yet reached the age of 60, so exactly from their 55th birthday to the day before their 60th birthday. The W55 division throws exactly the same 1 kg implement as the Open division.

Key

Incomplete information Pending

Distance	Athlete	Nationality	Birthdate	Location	Date
43.36	Tamara Danilova	Russia	30.07.1939	Prien am Chiemsee	10.08.1996
40.98	Odette Domingos	Brazil	05.09.1934	São Paulo	22.06.1990
40.86	Rosemary Chrimes	United Kingdom	19.05.1933	Eugene	04.08.1989
