= Virzhiniya Mikhaylova =

Bulgarian discus thrower

Personal information
- Nationality: Bulgarian
- Born: 1 January 1932 (age 94)

Sport
- Sport: Athletics
- Event: Discus throw

Virzhiniya Mikhaylova (born 1 January 1932) is a Bulgarian athlete. She competed in the women's discus throw at the 1964 Summer Olympics.
