= Dashzevegiin Namjilmaa =

Mongolian discus thrower (born 1944)

Personal information
- Native name: Дашзэвэгийн Намжилмаа
- Full name: Dashzevegiin Namjilmaa
- Nationality: Mongolian
- Born: 25 May 1944 (age 82) Ulaanbaatar, Mongolia

Sport
- Sport: Athletics
- Event(s): Discus throw, shot put
Medal record
Women's athletics
Representing Mongolia
Asian Games
Silver medal – second place	1974 Tehran	Discus throw

Dashzevegiin Namjilmaa (Mongolian: Дашзэвэгийн Намжилмаа; born 25 May 1944) is a Mongolian thrower. She would compete at the 1964 Summer Olympics, representing Mongolia in women's athletics. She would be one of the first Mongolian athletes to compete at an Olympic Games as the nation would debut at these Summer Games. There, she would place 17th in the qualifying round for the women's discus throw and would not advance to the finals of the event.

Namjilmaa would then compete at the 1968 Summer Olympics, once again competing in the women's discus throw. There, she would place 12th overall. After the Summer Games, she would win a silver medal at the 1974 Asian Games in the same event.

== Biography ==
Dashzevegiin Namjilmaa was born on 25 May 1944 in Ulaanbaatar, Mongolia. Namjilmaa would compete at the 1964 Summer Olympics in Tokyo, Japan, representing Mongolia in women's athletics. She would be one of the first Mongolian athletes to compete at an Olympic Games as the nation had made their first appearance at these Summer Games.

She would compete in the qualifying round for the women's discus throw on 19 October against 20 other competitors. There, she would throw consecutive throws of 43.37 metres, 40.26 metres, and 44.55 metres, being credited with her last throw as it was the highest. She would place 17th in the event and would not qualify for the finals of the event. She was also entered to compete in the women's shot put but did not start in the event.

Her next appearance at the Olympic Games for the Mongolian team would be at the 1968 Summer Olympics in Mexico City, once again competing in women's athletics. She would compete in the women's discus throw on 18 October against 14 other competitors. She would throw 50.76 metres for her first attempt and would not record a second one, eventually 49.00 metres for her last. Her highest throw would not be sufficient to advance further into the competition, placing 12th overall. After the Summer Games, she would compete at the 1974 Asian Games held in Tehran, Iran. There, she would win the silver medal in the women's discus throw.
