= Masters W65 discus world record progression =

Masters W65 discus world record progression is the progression of world record improvements of the discus W65 division of Masters athletics. Records must be set in properly conducted, official competitions under the standing IAAF rules unless modified by World Masters Athletics. The W65 division consists of female athletes who have reached the age of 65 but have not yet reached the age of 70, so exactly from their 65th birthday to the day before their 70th birthday. The W65 division throws exactly the same 1 kg implement as the Open division.

Key

Incomplete information Pending

Distance	Athlete	Nationality	Birthdate	Age	Location	Date	Ref
37.62 m	Tamara Danilova	Russia	30 July 1939	66 years, 29 days	San Sebastian	28 August 2005	
36.11 m	Sirkka Kauppinen	Finland	23 August 1937	65 years, 8 days	Li	31 August 2002	
35.79 m	Anne Chatrine Rühlow	Germany	30 September 1936	65 years, 242 days	Ahlen	30 May 2002	
34.95 m	Rosemary Chrimes	Great Britain	19 May 1933	68 years, 92 days	Nuneaton	19 August 2001	
34.00 m	Zsuzsa Serédi Wissinger	Germany	7 February 1934	67 years, 185 days	Budapest	11 August 2001	
31.87 m	Sigrun Kofink	Germany	23 April 1935	65 years, 78 days	Jyväskylä	10 July 2000	
31.65 m	Jutta Schäfer	Germany	17 October 1931	66 years, 330 days	Cesenatico	12 September 1998	
30.00 m	Ingeborg Pfuller	Argentina	1 January 1932	65 years, 203 days	Durban	23 July 1997	
