= Danuta Rosani =

Polish discus thrower

Personal information
- Nationality: Polish
- Born: 30 April 1951 (age 75) Starogard Gdański

Sport
- Sport: Athletics
- Event: Discus throw

Danuta Rosani (born 30 April 1951) is a Polish athlete. She competed in the women's discus throw at the 1976 Summer Olympics.
