= Gabriele Hinzmann =

East German discus thrower

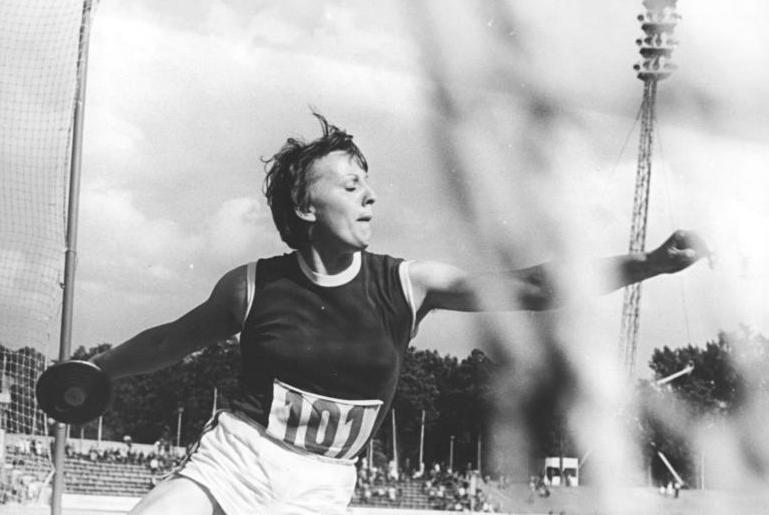
- Hinzmann in 1972

Personal information
- Born: 31 May 1947 (age 79) Schwerin, Soviet occupation zone of Germany
- Height: 1.80 m (5 ft 11 in)
- Weight: 78 kg (172 lb)

Sport
- Sport: Athletics
- Event: Discus throw
- Club: ASK Vorwärts Potsdam
- Coached by: Lothar Hillebrand

Achievements and titles
- Personal best: 67.02 m (1973)
Medal record
Women's athletics
Representing East Germany
Olympic Games
Bronze medal – third place	1976 Montreal	Discus
European Championships
Bronze medal – third place	1974 Rome	Discus

Gabriele Hinzmann (née Trepschek; born 31 May 1947) is a German former track and field athlete who competed mainly in the discus throw, such as at the 1976 Summer Olympics held in Montreal, Quebec, Canada, where she competed for East Germany and won the bronze medal.

== Competitions ==
Olympic Games

- 1972 Summer Olympics – Women's discus throw
- 1976 Summer Olympics – Women's discus throw

European Athletics Championships

- 1974 European Athletics Championships – Women's discus throw
- 1974 European Athletics Championships – Women's discus throw

European Cup

- 1973 European Cup – Women's discus throw
- 1975 European Cup – Women's discus throw

European Junior Games

- 1964 European Junior Games – Women's discus throw

== See also ==
- East Germany at the 1976 Summer Olympics
