= Masters W35 discus world record progression =

Masters W35 discus world record progression is the progression of world record improvements of the discus W35 division of Masters athletics. Records must be set in properly conducted, official competitions under the standing IAAF rules unless modified by World Masters Athletics. The W35 division consists of female athletes who have reached the age of 35 but have not yet reached the age of 40, so exactly from their 35th birthday to the day before their 40th birthday. The W35 division throws exactly the same 1 kg implement as the Open division. These competitors all threw their records in open competition.

Key

Incomplete information Pending

Distance	Athlete	Nationality	Birthdate	Location	Date
69.60	Faina Melnik Veleva	Soviet Union	09.07.1945	Donetsk	06.08.1980
68.32	Faina Melnik Veleva	Soviet Union	09.07.1945	Podolsk	12.07.1980
63.98	Lyudmila Khmelevskaya	Belarus	30.03.1940	Minsk	06.10.1976
60.08	Helgi Parts	Soviet Union	15.09.1937	Tallinn	11.07.1976
58.28	Lia Manoliu	Romania	25.04.1932	Mexico City	12.10.1968
52.48	Nina Ponomareva Romashkova	Soviet Union	27.04.1929	Tokyo	19.10.1964
52.15	Nina Ponomareva Romashkova	Soviet Union	27.04.1929	Tokyo	19.10.1964
50.18	Nina Ponomareva Romashkova	Soviet Union	27.04.1929	Tokyo	19.10.1964
44.89	Nina Ponomareva Romashkova	Soviet Union	27.04.1929	Tokyo	11.10.1964
44.69	Nina Ponomareva Romashkova	Soviet Union	27.04.1929	Tokyo	11.10.1964
