= Werner Franke =

German biology professor (1940–2022)

- Born: 31 January 1940; Paderborn, German Reich
- Died: 14 November 2022 (aged 82)
- Education: Heidelberg University (PhD)
- Occupations: Cell biologist; Molecular biologist; Academic teacher
- Known for: Cytoskeleton, doping in sport
- Spouse: Brigitte Berendonk
- Awards: Meyenburg Prize; Ernst Jung Prize; Order of Merit of the Federal Republic of Germany
- Scientific career
- Workplaces: University of Freiburg; German Cancer Research Center; Heidelberg University

Werner Wilhelm Franke (31 January 1940 – 14 November 2022) was a German biologist and a professor of cell and molecular biology at the German Cancer Research Center in Heidelberg. He was an anti-doping pioneer in Germany.

== Life ==
Franke was born in Paderborn on 31 January 1940. After completing high school (Abitur at Gymnasium Theodorianum), he studied chemistry, biology and physics at the University of Heidelberg. Following completion of his doctorate (Heidelberg) and habilitation (Freiburg) he became a university professor in Heidelberg and, at the same time, became the head of a department at the German Cancer Research Center. In 1982, Franke became the president of the European Cell Biology Organization (ECBO), a post he held until 1990. His main research field was the molecular characterization of the cytoskeleton in normal and transformed cells. He was also a doping expert.

Franke died on 14 November 2022 from an intracerebral hemorrhage, at age 82.

=== Drug abuse in sports ===
Franke is considered to have been a leading expert in performance-enhancing drugs and one of the most ardent critics of drug abuse in sports. Together with his wife, Brigitte Berendonk, once an Olympic discus thrower and shot putter, he fought against drug abuse in sports. He assisted his wife in researching the 1991 book Doping: From Research to Deceit, uncovering the systematic use of doping by East German athletes.

Franke defended cyclist Danilo Hondo after the banned substance Carphedon was found in his blood during the 2005 Vuelta a Murcia. Franke argued that the amount found in his blood was "laughably small" and that "you can only get this medication through certain channels in Russia or China, where it is used by the military and the space flight programs."

During an interview on 3 August 2006 with German regional television channel rheinmaintv, Franke claimed that cyclist Jan Ullrich purchased about €35,000 worth of doping products a year from Eufemiano Fuentes based on documents uncovered in the Operación Puerto doping case. A German court imposed a gag order on Franke after it found there was not enough evidence to link Ullrich to doping. However, that case returned to court with DNA analysis linking Ullrich to nine bags of blood seized in the Puerto case, and eventually after four years, Franke won the case.

== Awards ==
- 1981 Meyenburg Prize
- 1984 Ernst Jung Prize
- 2004 Order of Merit of the Federal Republic of Germany

=== Memberships ===
- 1977 European Molecular Biology Organization (EMBO)
- 1986 Heidelberg Academy of Sciences and Humanities
- 1988 Honorary Member of the American Association for Anatomy
- 1989 Academia Europaea

== Works ==
=== Cell biology ===
Franke is author and co-author of c. 660 original articles in the field of cell and molecular biology. As of 2022, his h-index is 158, according to Google scholar.

- Moll, Roland; Franke, Werner W.; Schiller, Dorothea L.; Geiger, Benjamin; Krepler, Reinhard (1982). "The catalog of human cytokeratins: Patterns of expression in normal epithelia, tumors and cultured cells". Cell. 31 (1). Elsevier BV: 11–24. doi:10.1016/0092-8674(82)90400-7. ISSN 0092-8674. PMID 6186379. S2CID 33701361.
- Wiedenmann, Bertram; Franke, Werner W. (1985). "Identification and localization of synaptophysin, an integral membrane glycoprotein of Mr 38,000 characteristic of presynaptic vesicles". Cell. 41 (3). Elsevier BV: 1017–1028. doi:10.1016/s0092-8674(85)80082-9. ISSN 0092-8674. PMID 3924408. S2CID 27796276.
- Franke, W W; Schmid, E; Osborn, M; Weber, K (1978). "Different intermediate-sized filaments distinguished by immunofluorescence microscopy". Proceedings of the National Academy of Sciences. 75 (10): 5034–5038. Bibcode:1978PNAS...75.5034F. doi:10.1073/pnas.75.10.5034. ISSN 0027-8424. PMC 336257. PMID 368806.

=== Doping ===
- Franke, Werner; Ludwig, Udo (2007). Der verratene Sport : Die Machenschaften der Doping-Mafia; Täter, Opfer und was wir ändern müssen (in German). [München]: Zabert Sandmann. ISBN 978-3-89883-185-7. OCLC 255677001.
- Berendonk, Brigitte (1992). Doping: Von der Forschung zum Betrug [Doping: From Research to Deceit] (in German). Reinbek bei Hamburg: Rowohlt. ISBN 3-499-18677-2. OCLC 231377968.
- Franke, Werner; Berendonk, Brigitte (1997). "Hormonal doping and androgenization of athletes: a secret program of the German Democratic Republic government". Clinical Chemistry. 43 (7): 1262–1279. doi:10.1093/clinchem/43.7.1262. ISSN 0009-9147. PMID 9216474.

== See also ==
- Doping in East Germany
