= Rita Pfister =

Swiss discus thrower

Personal information
- Nationality: Swiss
- Born: 20 March 1952 (age 74)

Sport
- Sport: Athletics
- Event: Discus throw

Rita Pfister (born 20 March 1952) is a Swiss athlete. She competed in the women's discus throw at the 1976 Summer Olympics.
