= Lucette Moreau =

Canadian athlete

Personal information
- Born: 17 January 1956 (age 70) Pointe-des-Cascades, Quebec, Canada

Sport
- Sport: Athletics
- Events: Shot put Discus
Medal record
Representing Canada
Commonwealth Games
Bronze medal – third place	1978 Edmonton	Discus throw
Pan American Games
Bronze medal – third place	1975 Mexico City	Shot put

Lucette Moreau (born 17 January 1956) is a Canadian athlete. She competed in the women's shot put and the women's discus throw at the 1976 Summer Olympics.
