= Olga Andrianova =

Soviet discus thrower

Personal information
- Nationality: Soviet
- Born: 12 June 1949 (age 77) Moscow, Russian SSR, USSR

Sport
- Sport: Athletics
- Event: Discus throw

Olga Viktorovna Andrianova (Russian: О́льга Ви́кторовна Андриа́нова; born 12 June 1949) is a Soviet athlete. She competed in the women's discus throw at the 1976 Summer Olympics.
