= Masters W70 discus world record progression =

Masters W70 discus world record progression is the progression of world record improvements of the discus W70 division of Masters athletics. Records must be set in properly conducted, official competitions under the standing IAAF rules unless modified by World Masters Athletics. The W70 division consists of female athletes who have reached the age of 70 but have not yet reached the age of 75, so exactly from their 70th birthday to the day before their 75th birthday. The W70 division throws exactly the same 1 kg implement as the Open division.

Key

Incomplete information Pending

Distance	Athlete	Nationality	Birthdate	Location	Date
33.80	Tamara Danilova	Russia	30.07.1939	Lahti	06.08.2009
31.62	Rosemary Chrimes	United Kingdom	19.05.1933	Derby	08.06.2003
27.54	Marianne Hamm	Germany	02.10.1927	Minden	31.07.1998
25.80	Toyoko Yoshino	Japan	23.04.1920	Aokicho	12.08.1990
