= Juliet Geverkof =

Iranian athletics competitor

Personal information
- Nationality: Iranian
- Born: 18 August 1945 (age 80)

Sport
- Sport: Athletics
- Events: Shot put Discus

Juliet Geverkof (born 18 August 1945) more known as Juliet Gevorgian (Persian: ژولیت گئورگیان, Armenian: Ժուլիէտ Գէորգեան) is an Iranian athlete. She competed in the women's shot put and the women's discus throw at the 1964 Summer Olympics.
