= Irene Schuch =

German discus thrower (1935–2023)

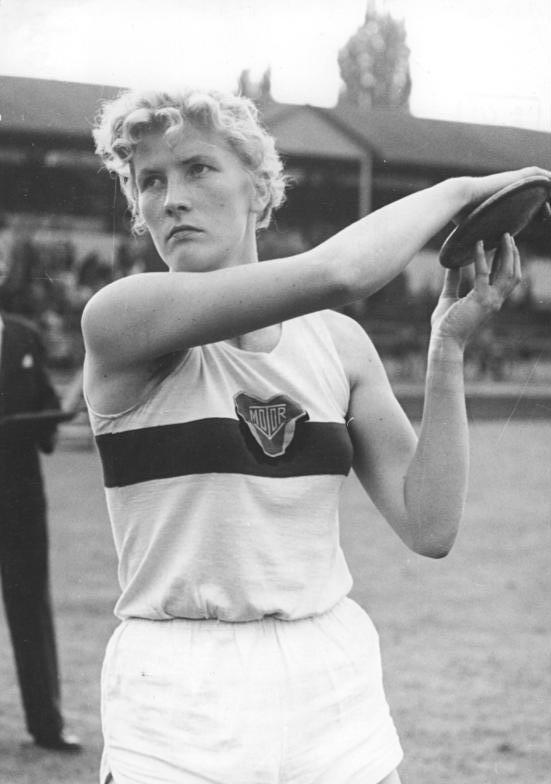
- Schuch in 1956

Personal information
- Nationality: German
- Born: 20 November 1935 Kutzleben, Germany
- Died: 6 September 2023 (aged 87) Leipzig, Saxony, Germany

Sport
- Sport: Athletics
- Event: Discus throw

Irene Schuch (20 November 1935 – 6 September 2023) was a German athlete. She competed in the women's discus throw at the 1960 Summer Olympics. Schuch died in Leipzig on 6 September 2023, at the age of 87.
