= Donald H. LeBrun =

American politician

Member of the New Hampshire House of Representatives from the Sullivan 3rd district
- In office 1974–1982

Personal details
- Born: September 18, 1912
- Died: January 21, 1998 (aged 85)
- Party: Democratic

Donald H. LeBrun (September 18, 1912 – January 21, 1998) was an American politician. He served as a Democratic member for the Sullivan 3rd district of the New Hampshire House of Representatives.

== Life and career ==
LeBrun was a member of the Claremont School Board.

LeBrun served in the New Hampshire House of Representatives from 1974 to 1982.

LeBrun died on January 21, 1998, at the age of 85.
