= Vasilka Stoeva =

Bulgarian athlete (born 1940)

Olympic medal record

Women's Athletics
Bronze medal – third place	1972 Munich	Discus

Vasilka Rafailova Stoeva (Bulgarian: Василка Рафаилова Стоева; born 14 January 1940 in Kotel, Sliven) is a Bulgarian athlete who competed mainly in the women's discus throw event during her career.

She competed for Bulgaria at the 1972 Summer Olympics held in Munich, Germany where she won the bronze medal in the women's discus throw event.
