= Wivianne Bergh =

Swedish discus thrower

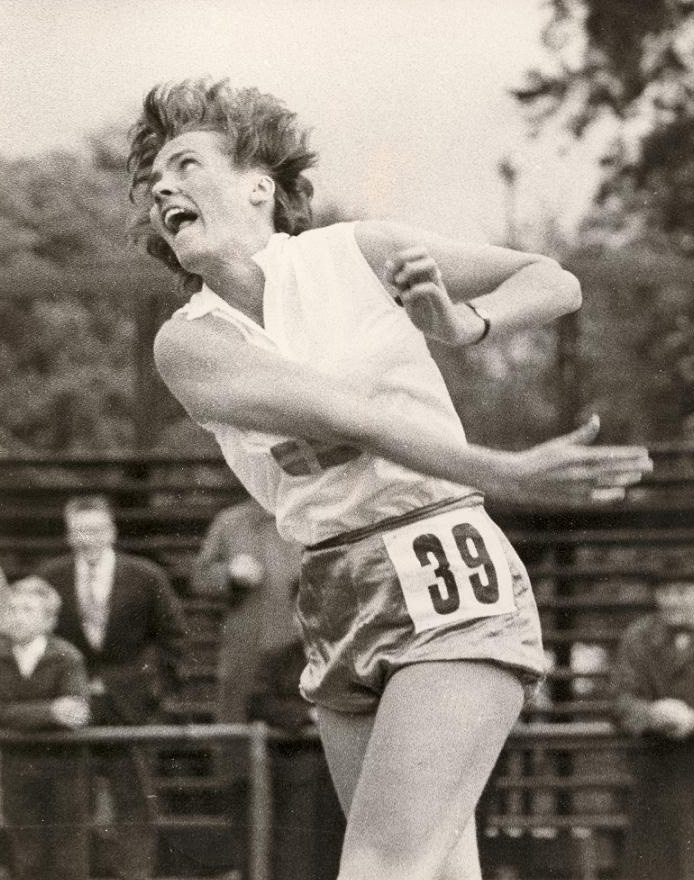

Personal information
- Born: 14 February 1939 Gothenburg, Sweden
- Died: 19 June 2017 (aged 78)
- Height: 1.78 m (5 ft 10 in)
- Weight: 71 kg (157 lb)

Sport
- Sport: Athletics
- Event: Discus throw
- Club: GKIK, Göteborg

Achievements and titles
- Personal best: 52.65 m (1964)

Maud Wivianne Bergh (later Freivald, 14 February 1939 – 19 June 2017) was a Swedish discus thrower. She competed at the 1960 Summer Olympics and finished 12th.

Born in Gothenburg to Olympic discus thrower Gunnar Bergh, Bergh competed for Göteborgs KIK. Bergh won the national discus title in 1960, 1962–64 and 1967–68, and set a national record at 52.65 m in 1964.
