= Booker Robinson =

- Third baseman
- Batted: Unknown Threw: Unknown

Negro league baseball debut
- 1944, for the Atlanta Black Crackers

Last appearance
- 1944, for the Newark Eagles

Teams
- Atlanta Black Crackers (1944); Newark Eagles (1944)

Booker Taliaferro Robinson (July 20, 1918 – January 29, 1998) was an American professional baseball third baseman in the Negro leagues. He played with the Atlanta Black Crackers and the Newark Eagles in 1944.
