= Park Yeong-suk (discus thrower) =

South Korean discus thrower

Personal information
- Nationality: South Korean
- Born: 24 January 1947 (age 79)

Sport
- Sport: Athletics
- Event: Discus throw

Park Yeong-suk (born 24 January 1947) is a South Korean athlete. She competed in the women's discus throw at the 1964 Summer Olympics.
