= Lyudmila Muravyova =

Soviet discus thrower

Personal information
- Nationality: Soviet
- Born: 10 November 1940 (age 85)

Sport
- Sport: Athletics
- Event: Discus throw
Medal record
Women's athletics
Representing Soviet Union
European Championships
Silver medal – second place	1969 Athens	Discus throw
Bronze medal – third place	1971 Helsinki	Discus throw

Lyudmila Muravyova (born 10 November 1940) is a Soviet athlete. She competed in the women's discus throw at the 1968 Summer Olympics and the 1972 Summer Olympics.
