= Christine Spielberg =

German track and field athlete

Christa Spielberg
Personal information
- Nationality: East German
- Born: 21 December 1941 (age 84) Niederlungwitz, Glauchau, Sachsen, Germany
- Height: 187 cm (6 ft 2 in)
- Weight: 83 kg (183 lb)

Sport
- Sport: Athletics
- Event: discus throw
- Club: SC Karl-Marx-Stadt
Medal record
Women's athletics
Representing East Germany
European Championships
Gold medal – first place	1966 Budapest	Discus

Christine Spielberg also known as Christa Spielberg (born 21 December 1941) is a former German track and field athlete who competed in the women's discus throw and comepeted at the 1968 Summer Olympics.

== Biography ==
She claimed the gold medal at the 1966 European Championships in the discus throw event.

Spielberg set the world record on 26 May 1968, reaching 61.64 m (202 ft 2 3/4 in) in Regis-Breitingen and on 20 July finished second behind Karin Illgen at the British 1968 WAAA Championships.

She represented East Germany at the 1968 Olympic Games and placed seventh in the final. She had the second-best throw of her career in the 1970 season, throwing 61.46 m (201 ft 7 1/2 in) which ranked her fifth in the world that year. In the last major outing, she finished eighth at the 1971 European Athletics Championships. Her season's best of 60.72 m (199 ft 2 1/2 in) that year made her the seventh best thrower for the season and was the final time she ranked in the top ten globally.

Records
Preceded by Liesel Westermann	Women's discus world record holder 26 May 1968 – 24 August 1968	Succeeded by Liesel Westermann
