= Dennis Hatsell =

English footballer (1930–1998)

Personal information
- Full name: Dennis Hatsell
- Date of birth: 9 June 1930
- Place of birth: Sheffield, England
- Date of death: 1 January 1998 (aged 67)
- Place of death: Basildon, England
- Position: Centre forward

Youth career
- 1945–1948: Preston North End

Senior career*
Years	Team	Apps	(Gls)
1948–1960	Preston North End	115	(54)
1960–1963	Chelmsford City		
1963–1965	Margate		
1965–1966	Gravesend & Northfleet		
- * Club domestic league appearances and goals

Dennis Hatsell (9 June 1930 – 1 January 1998) was an English footballer who played as a centre forward.

== Career ==
Born in Sheffield on 9 June 1930, Hatsell moved to Preston at the age of seven. Hatsell attended Middleforth School in Penwortham, where he played as a goalkeeper before converting to a forward. In 1945, Hatsell was signed by Preston North End as an amateur and signed a full professional contract three years later. On 19 September 1953, Hatsell made his debut for Preston in a 1–0 defeat away to Manchester United. Following the game against Manchester United, Hatsell scored six goals in six games. On 19 April 1954, Hatsell scored a hat-trick in a 6–2 away win at Tottenham Hotspur. Hatsell made 115 Football League appearances for Preston, scoring 54 goals.

In July 1960, Hatsell signed for non-league club Chelmsford City after being transfer listed by Preston for £10,000 as a result of a knee injury. Hatsell made 73 appearances for Chelmsford in all competitions, scoring 28 times. Hatsell also made 29 appearances for the club's reserve side after struggling with injuries. In May 1963, following his release from Chelmsford, Hatsell signed for Margate. In two years at Margate, Hatsell scored 27 times in 95 appearances. In May 1965, Hatsell signed for Gravesend & Northfleet. Hatsell made 15 appearances during his time at the club, scoring once, as injuries once again played a part. In 1966, Hatsell retired due to constant injuries.
