= Doris Lorenz-Müller =

German discus thrower (1935–2013)

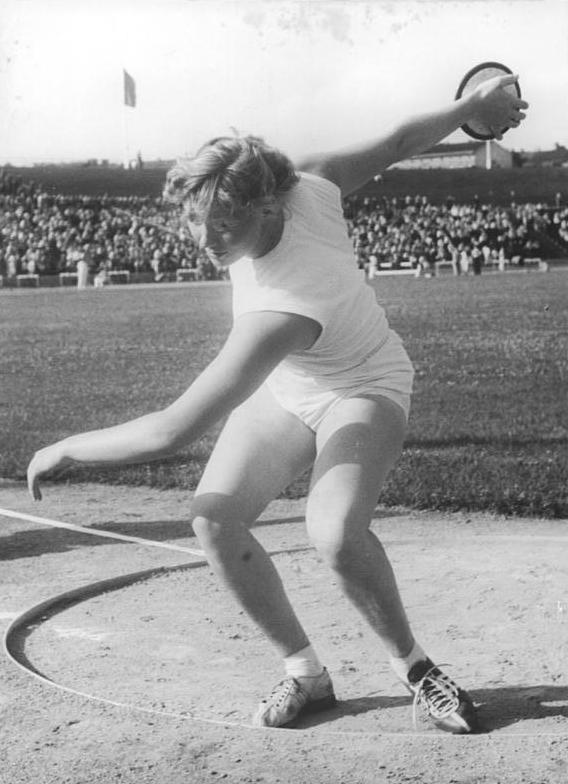
- Doris Lorenz-Müller in 1953

Personal information
- Nationality: German
- Born: 25 February 1935
- Died: 25 February 2013 (aged 78)

Sport
- Sport: Athletics
- Event: Discus throw
Medal record
Women's athletics
Representing East Germany
European Championships
Silver medal – second place	1962 Belgrade	Discus throw

Doris Lorenz-Müller, née Doris Müller, (25 February 1935 – 25 February 2013) was a German athlete. She competed in the women's discus throw at the 1960 Summer Olympics and the 1964 Summer Olympics.
