= Štěpánka Mertová =

Czech discus thrower (1930–2004)

Personal information
- Nationality: Czech
- Born: 11 December 1930 Moravičany, Czechoslovakia
- Died: 20 September 2004 (aged 73)

Sport
- Sport: Athletics
- Event: Discus throw
Medal record
Women's athletics
Representing Czechoslovakia
European Championships
Silver medal – second place	1958 Stockholm	Discus throw

Štěpánka Mertová (11 December 1930 – 20 September 2004) was a Czech athlete. She competed in the women's discus throw at the 1956 Summer Olympics and the 1960 Summer Olympics.
