= Antonina Popova =

Soviet discus thrower

Personal information
- Full name: Antonina Nikolayevna Popova
- Nationality: Soviet
- Born: Antonina Nikolayevna Zolotukhina; 25 April 1935 Taganrog, Soviet Union
- Died: 7 September 2022 (aged 87) St. Petersburg, Russia

Sport
- Sport: Athletics
- Event: Discus throw
Medal record
Representing Soviet Union
Summer Universiade
Silver medal – second place	1961 Sofia	Discus throw

Antonina Nikolayevna Popova (Russian: Антони́на Никола́eвна Попо́ва; née Zolotukhina; born 25 April 1935) is a Soviet athlete. She competed in the women's discus throw at the 1968 Summer Olympics.
