= Argentina Menis =

Romanian discus thrower (1948–2023)

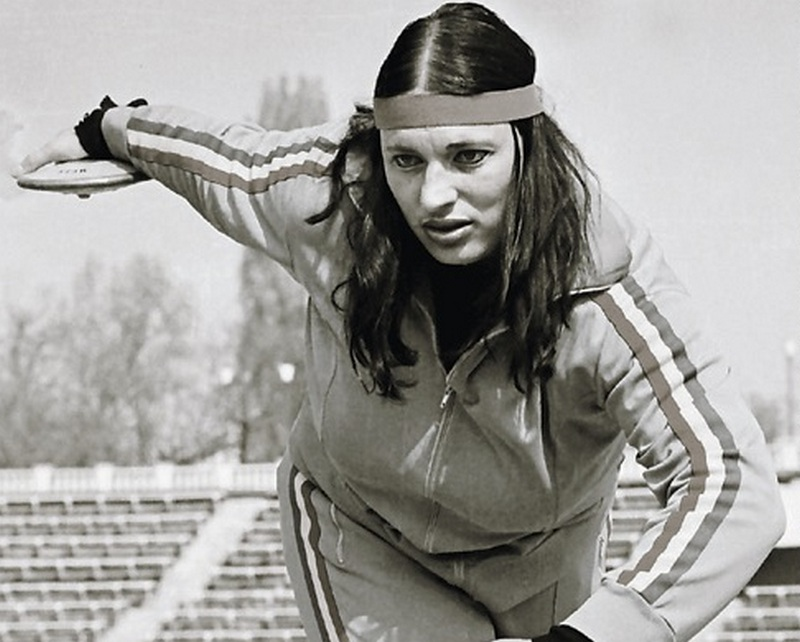
- Menis at the 1972 Olympics

Personal information
- Born: 19 July 1948 Cernele, Dolj, Romania
- Died: 3 March 2023 (aged 74)
- Height: 1.71 m (5 ft 7 in)
- Weight: 85 kg (187 lb)

Sport
- Sport: Athletics
- Event: Discus throw
- Club: CS Dinamo București
- Coached by: Mihai Nistor; Ion Rinderiu; Ioan Benga

Achievements and titles
- Personal best: 67.96 m (1976)
Medal record
Women's athletics
Representing Romania
Olympic Games
Silver medal – second place	1972 Munich	Discus throw
European Championships
Silver medal – second place	1974 Rome	Discus throw
Universiade
Silver medal – second place	1973 Moscow	Discus throw
Silver medal – second place	1975 Rome	Discus throw

Argentina Menis (19 July 1948 – 3 March 2023) was a Romanian discus thrower who won silver medals at the 1972 Summer Olympics in. Munich and 1974 European Athletics Championships. She finished sixth at the 1976 Olympics. On 23 September 1972, she set a world record that stood for eight months. After retiring from competitions she worked at her club Dinamo București.

Menis died on 3 March 2023, at the age of 74.

Records
Preceded by (Soviet Union) Faina Melnik	Women's Discus World Record Holder; 23 September 1972 – 25 May 1973	Succeeded by (Soviet Union) Faina Melnik
