= Yevgeniya Kuznetsova (athlete) =

Soviet discus thrower

Personal information
- Nationality: Soviet
- Born: 1 January 1936 (age 89)

Sport
- Sport: Athletics
- Event: Discus throw

Yevgeniya Kuznetsova (born 1 January 1936) is a Soviet athlete. She competed in the women's discus throw at the 1960 Summer Olympics and the 1964 Summer Olympics.
