= Faina Melnik =

Soviet discus thrower (1945–2016)

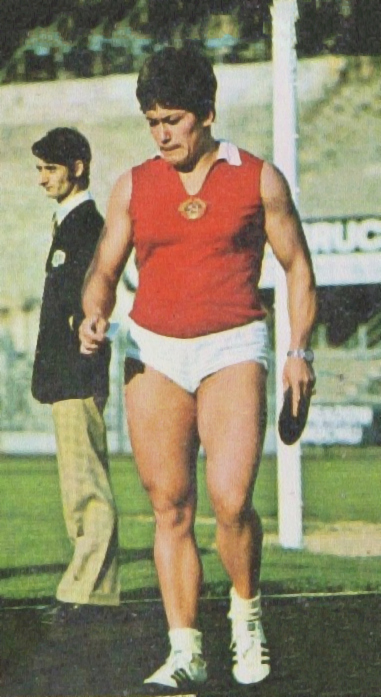
- Faina Melnik at the 1972 Olympics

Personal information
- Nationality: Soviet
- Born: Faina Grigorievna Melnik; 9 June 1945 Bakota, Ukrainian SSR, Soviet Union
- Died: 16 December 2016 (aged 71) Moscow, Russia
- Height: 1.74 m (5 ft 9 in)
- Weight: 88 kg (194 lb)

Sport
- Country: Soviet Union
- Sport: Discus throw, shot put
- Club: Sevan Yerevan (1969–73); Spartak Moscow (1976–80)

Achievements and titles
- Personal bests: DT – 70.50 m (1976); SP – 20.03 m (1976)
Medal record
Women's athletics
Representing the Soviet Union
Olympic Games
Gold medal – first place	1972 Munich	Discus
IAAF World Cup
Gold medal – first place	1977 Düsseldorf	Discus
European Championships
Gold medal – first place	1971 Helsinki	Discus
Gold medal – first place	1974 Rome	Discus
Universiade
Gold medal – first place	1973 Moscow	Discus

Faina Grigorievna Veleva-Melnik (Russian: Фаина Григорьевна Велева-Мельник; Ukrainian: Фаїна Григорівна Велєва-Мельник, romanized: Faina Hryhorivna Velieva-Melnyk; née Melnik; 9 June 1945 – 16 December 2016) was a Soviet discus thrower, a 1972 Summer Olympics champion in the discus event. During her career she set 11 world records.

== Career ==
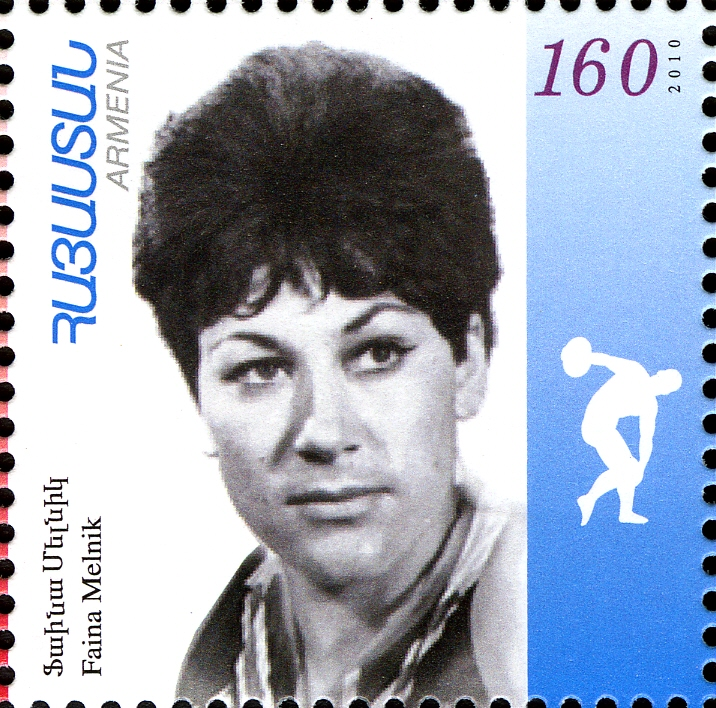
Faina Melnyk on a 2010 Armenian stamp

Melnik was Jewish and was born in Bakota, Khmelnytskyi, Ukraine. At the 1972 Summer Olympics, she broke the Olympic record three times, and set a world record at 66.62 metres. She had already broken the world record at the 1971 European Athletics Championships, representing the then Soviet Union. In 1976, she had her best ever discus throw of 70.50 m, but finished only fourth at the 1976 Summer Olympics. At those Olympics, she also competed in the shot put and finished tenth. She failed to reach the final in the discus event at the 1980 Games.

Continuing to throw after the 1980 Olympics, she set the masters world record in the W35 division that has stood since 1980.

Melnik graduated from the Moscow State University of Medicine and Dentistry and later worked as a dentist and athletics coach in Moscow. Her trainees include Natalya Lisovskaya and Svetlana Krivelyova. Melnik was married to Velko Velev, a Bulgarian discus thrower who also competed at the 1976 and 1980 Olympics.

She later became an inspiration for Miss Trunchbull in the Roald Dahl children's book Matilda.

== See also ==
- List of select Jewish track and field athletes

Records
Preceded by (West Germany) Liesel Westermann	Women's Discus World Record Holder; 12 August 1971 – 23 September 1972	Succeeded by (Romania) Argentina Menis
Preceded by (Romania) Argentina Menis	Women's Discus World Record Holder; 25 May 1973 – 12 August 1978	Succeeded by (East Germany) Evelin Jahl
Awards
Preceded by (Poland) Irena Szewińska	Women's Track & Field Athlete of the Year; 1975	Succeeded by (Soviet Union) Tatyana Kazankina
Sporting positions
Preceded by (Romania) Argentina Menis	Women's Discus Best Year Performance; 1973–1976	Succeeded by (East Germany) Sabine Engel
