= Kriemhild Limberg =

German discus thrower (1934–2020)

Personal information
- Nationality: German
- Born: 8 September 1934 Rheinhausen, Duisburg, Nordrhein-Westfalen, Germany
- Died: 24 August 2020 (aged 85) n Neuss, Nordrhein-Westfalen, Germany
- Height: 182 cm (6 ft 0 in)
- Weight: 76 kg (168 lb)

Sport
- Sport: Athletics
- Event: Discus throw
- Club: KTSV Preussen 1855
Medal record
Women's athletics
Representing West Germany
European Championships
Bronze medal – third place	1958 Stockholm	Discus throw

Kriemhild Limberg, née Kriemhild Hausmann, (8 September 1934 – 24 August 2020) was a German athlete, who competed at the 1960 Summer Olympics and the 1964 Summer Olympics.

== Biography ==
At the 1960 Olympic Games in Rome, Limberg competed in the women's discus throw.

Limberg won the British WAAA Championships title in the discus event at the 1964 WAAA Championships. Shortly afterwards, at the 1964 Olympic Games in Tokyo, she represented Germany again in the discus event.

Limberg returned to the British WAAA Championships and finished second behind Elivia Ballotta at the 1965 WAAA Championships.
