= Tamara Press =

Soviet athlete (1937–2021)

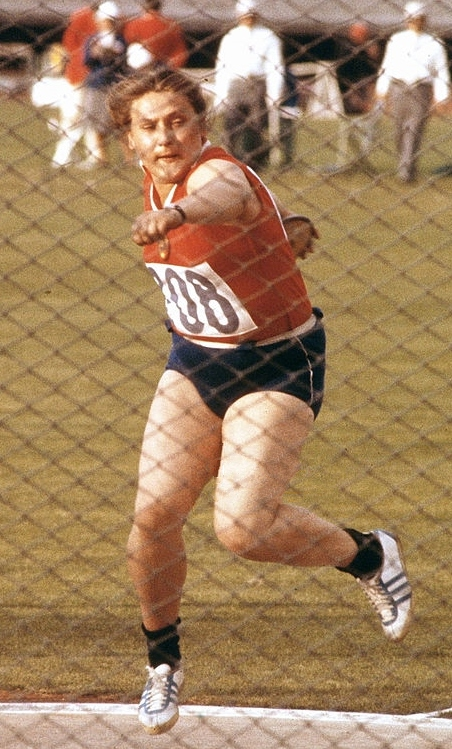
- Tamara Press at the 1964 Olympics

Personal information
- Born: 10 May 1937 Kharkov, Ukrainian SSR, Soviet Union
- Died: 26 April 2021 (aged 83) Moscow, Russia
- Height: 1.80 m (5 ft 11 in)
- Weight: 102 kg (225 lb)

Sport
- Sport: Shot put, discus throw
- Club: Trud St. Petersburg
Medal record
Women's athletics
Representing Soviet Union
Olympic Games
Gold medal – first place	1960 Rome	Shot put
Gold medal – first place	1964 Tokyo	Shot put
Gold medal – first place	1964 Tokyo	Discus throw
Silver medal – second place	1960 Rome	Discus throw
European Championships
Gold medal – first place	1958 Stockholm	Discus throw
Gold medal – first place	1962 Belgrade	Shot put
Gold medal – first place	1962 Belgrade	Discus throw
Bronze medal – third place	1958 Stockholm	Shot put
Universiade
Gold medal – first place	1961 Sofia	Discus throw
Gold medal – first place	1963 Porto Alegre	Discus throw

Tamara Natanovna Press (Note: Russian: Тамара Натановна Пресс, Ukrainian: Тамара Натанівна Пресс, Tamara Natanivna Press) (10 May 1937 – 26 April 2021) was a Soviet athlete who dominated the shot put and discus throw in the early 1960s. She won three gold medals and one silver medal at the 1960 and 1964 Olympics and three European titles in 1958–1962. Between 1959 and 1965, she set 11 world records: five in the shot put and six in the discus. Domestically, she held 16 national titles, nine in the shot put (1958–66) and seven in the discus (1960–66).

Her younger sister Irina Press was also a prominent track athlete, mostly in the sprint events.

== Career ==
Tamara Press was born to parents in Kharkov. Her father died fighting in World War II in 1942 and her mother took the daughters to Samarkand, where they started training in athletics. In 1955, Press moved to Leningrad to train under the renowned coach Viktor Alekseyev. The following year she was shortlisted for the Olympic team but was cut due to a strong domestic competition in the throwing events. She subsequently won four Olympic medals, three of them gold.

== Retirement and gender rumors ==
Both sisters were accused of being either secretly male or intersex. They retired in 1966, just before sex verification became mandatory on location. In 1942 wartime Soviet evacuation records (at age 5) Tamara Press is documented as a girl.

In retirement, Press worked as an athletics coach and official in Moscow. She wrote several books on sport, social and economical subjects. In 1974, she defended a PhD in pedagogy. She was awarded the Order of Lenin (1960), Order of the Badge of Honour (1964) and Order of Friendship (1997).

== Notes ==
Records
Preceded by Nina Dumbadze	Women's Discus World Record Holder; 12 September 1960 – 5 November 1967	Succeeded by Liesel Westermann
