= Liesel Westermann =

German discus thrower

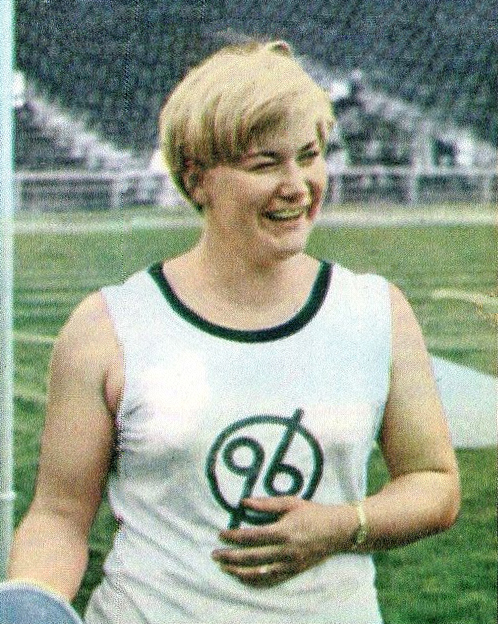
- Liesel Westermann in 1968

Personal information
- Born: 2 November 1944 (age 81) Sulingen, Germany
- Height: 1.72 m (5 ft 8 in)
- Weight: 78 kg (172 lb)

Sport
- Sport: Athletics
- Event: Discus throw
- Club: Bayer Leverkusen
- Coached by: Gerd Osenberg

Achievements and titles
- Personal best: 64.96 m (1972)
Medal record
Women's athletics
Representing West Germany
Olympic Games
Silver medal – second place	1968 Mexico City	Discus
European Championships
Silver medal – second place	1966 Budapest	Discus
Silver medal – second place	1971 Helsinki	Discus
Universiade
Gold medal – first place	1967 Tokyo	Discus

Lieselotte "Liesel" Westermann-Krieg (born Westermann on 2 November 1944; German pronunciation: [ˈliːzl̩ ˈvɛstɐˌman]) is a retired German discus thrower. She held the world record from 5 November 1967 to 12 August 1971, with a two-month break in 1968 and competed at two Olympic Games.

== Biography ==
Westermann competed for West Germany at the 1968 and 1972 Olympics and finished in second and fifth place, respectively. She won silver medals at the 1966 and 1971 European championships. For her athletics achievements Westermann was selected as the German Sportspersonality of the year in 1967 and 1969, and inducted into the Germany's Sports Hall of Fame in 2011.

Westermann won the British WAAA Championships title in the discus throw event at the British 1971 WAAA Championships.

After retiring from competitions Westermann worked as a teacher of physical education, eventually becoming a consultant for sports and health education with the Ministry for Science and Culture of Lower Saxony. An avid opponent of doping (she was once described as the last undoped discus world record holder) she was a member of the Anti-Doping Commission of the German Sports Federation and the National Olympic Committee. Westermann is married and has four children. As a member of the Free Democratic Party she unsuccessfully contested district elections in 1984.

== Publications ==
- Liesel Westermann (1977) Es kann nicht immer Lorbeer sein. Molden, Munich, ISBN 3-217-00846-4.

Records
Preceded by Tamara Press; Christine Spielberg	Women's Discus World Record Holder; 5 November 1967 – 26 May 1968; 24 August 1968 – 12 August 1971	Succeeded by Christine Spielberg; Faina Melnik
Awards
Preceded by Helga Hoffmann & Karin Frisch; Ingrid Becker	German Sportswoman of the Year; 1967; 1969	Succeeded by Ingrid Becker; Heide Rosendahl
