= Karin Illgen =

East German discus thrower (1941–2026)

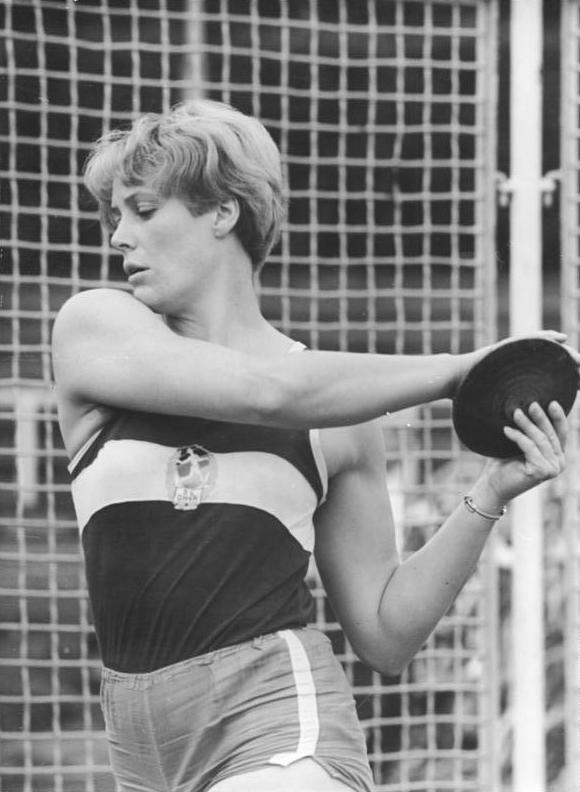
- Illgen in 1967

Personal information
- Nationality: East German
- Born: 7 April 1941 Greifswald, Gau Pomerania, Germany
- Died: 9 June 2026 (aged 85) Leipzig, Saxony, Germany

Sport
- Sport: Athletics
- Event: Discus throw

Karin Illgen (7 April 1941 – 9 June 2026) was a German discus thrower who competed for East Germany during her career and appeared at the 1968 Summer Olympics.

== Career ==
Illgen won the British WAAA Championships title in the discus throw event at the 1968 WAAA Championships.

At the 1968 Olympic Games in Mexico City, she represented East Germany, finishing in tenth place in the overall-rankings.

== Death ==
Illgen died on 9 June 2026, at the age of 85.
