= Judit Stugner =

Hungarian discus thrower

Personal information
- Nationality: Hungarian
- Born: 22 January 1942 (age 84) Budapest, Hungary

Sport
- Sport: Athletics
- Event: Discus throw
Medal record
Representing Hungary
Summer Universiade
Silver medal – second place	1965 Budapest	Discus throw

Judit Stugner (born 22 January 1942) is a Hungarian athlete. She competed in the women's discus throw at the 1964 Summer Olympics and the 1968 Summer Olympics.
