= Jolán Kleiber-Kontsek =

Hungarian discus thrower (1939–2022)

Personal information
- Born: Jolán Kontsek; 29 August 1939 Budapest, Hungary
- Died: 20 July 2022 (aged 82) Budapest, Hungary
Medal record
Women's athletics
Representing Hungary
Olympic Games
Bronze medal – third place	1968 Mexico City	Discus throw
European Championships
Bronze medal – third place	1962 Belgrade	Discus throw
Universiade
Gold medal – first place	1965 Budapest	Discus throw
Silver medal – second place	1963 Porto Alegre	Discus throw
Bronze medal – third place	1961 Sofia	Discus throw
Bronze medal – third place	1963 Porto Alegre	Shot put

Jolán Kleiber-Kontsek (née Kontsek; 29 August 1939 – 20 July 2022) was a Hungarian athlete who mainly competed in the discus throw event during her career.

In 1964, she finished sixth in the discus competition at the Olympics. She competed for Hungary in the 1968 Summer Olympics held in Mexico City, Mexico where she won a bronze medal in the discus throw competition.

She was named Hungarian Sportswoman of The Year in 1965 after having won the Summer Universiade the same year held in her hometown, Budapest.

Awards
Preceded by Ildikó Rejtő	Hungarian Sportswoman of The Year; 1965	Succeeded by Zsuzsa Nagy Szabó
