= Olimpia Cataramă =

Romanian discus thrower

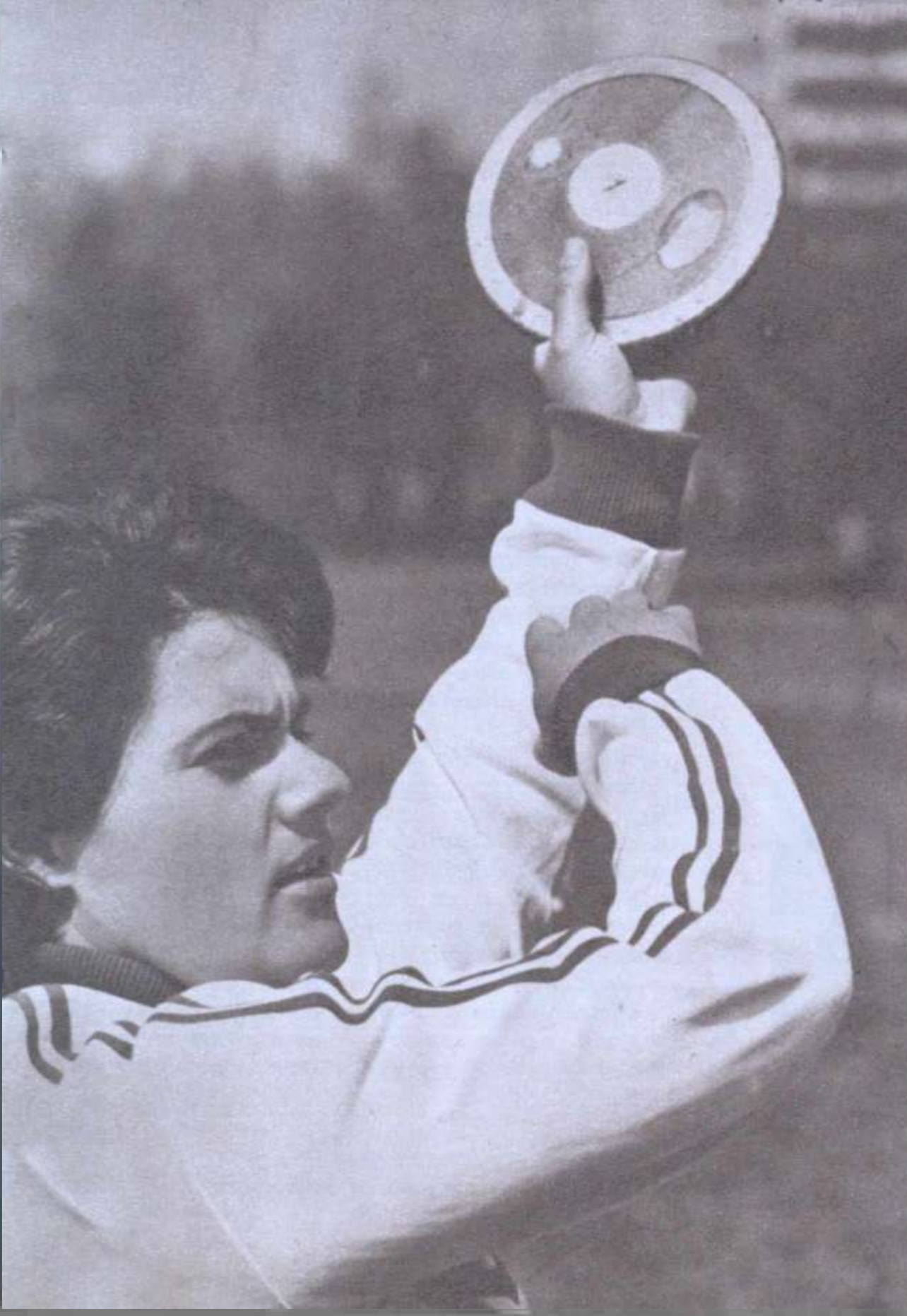
- Cataramă in 1972

Personal information
- Nationality: Romanian
- Born: 25 October 1940 (age 85) Lerești, Romania

Sport
- Sport: Athletics
- Event: Discus throw

Olimpia Cataramă (born 25 October 1940) is a Romanian athlete. She competed in the women's discus throw at the 1964 Summer Olympics and the 1968 Summer Olympics.
