= Brigitte Berendonk =

German discus thrower

Personal information
- Nationality: German
- Born: 2 May 1942 (age 84) Dankmarshausen, Thuringia, Germany
- Spouse: Werner Franke

Sport
- Sport: Athletics
- Event: Discus throw
Medal record
Representing West Germany
Summer Universiade
Silver medal – second place	1967 Tokyo	Discus throw
Silver medal – second place	1970 Turin	Discus throw
Bronze medal – third place	1967 Tokyo	Shot put

Brigitte Berendonk (born 2 May 1942) is a German athlete. She competed in the women's discus throw at the 1968 Summer Olympics and the 1972 Summer Olympics.

== Publications ==
- Berendonk, Brigitte (1992). Doping : von der Forschung zum Betrug (in German). Reinbek bei Hamburg: Rowohlt. ISBN 3-499-18677-2. OCLC 231377968.
