= Lia Manoliu =

Romanian discus thrower

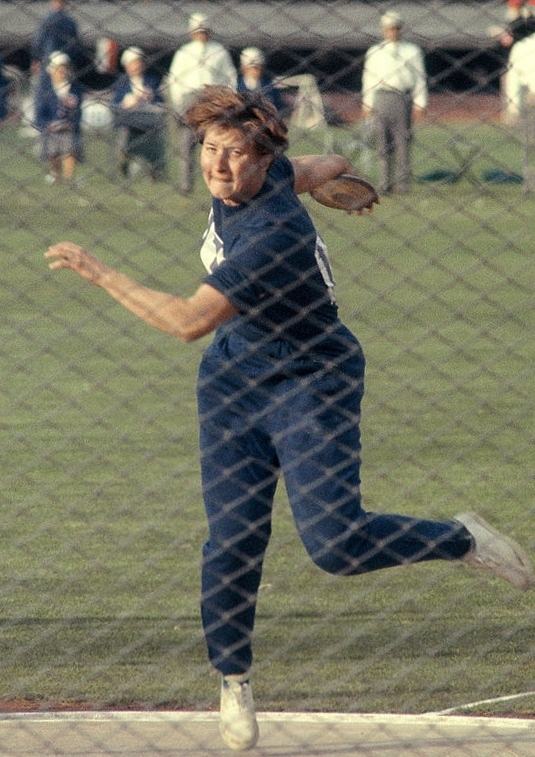
- Manoliu at the 1964 Olympics

Personal information
- Born: 25 April 1932 Chișinău, Kingdom of Romania (now Moldova)
- Died: 9 January 1998 (aged 65) Bucharest, Romania
- Resting place: Bellu Cemetery, Bucharest
- Education: Politehnica University of Bucharest
- Height: 1.79 m (5 ft 10 in)
- Weight: 85 kg (187 lb)

Sport
- Sport: Discus throw
- Club: Metalul București

Achievements and titles
- Personal best: 62.06 m (1972)
Medal record
Women's athletics
Representing Romania
Olympic Games
Gold medal – first place	1968 Mexico City	Discus throw
Bronze medal – third place	1960 Rome	Discus throw
Bronze medal – third place	1964 Tokyo	Discus throw

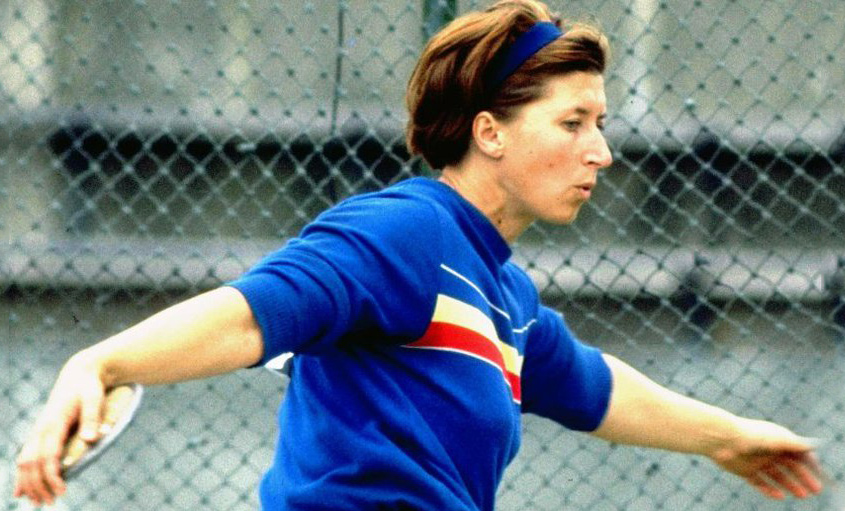
Lia Manoliu

Lia Manoliu (Romanian pronunciation: [ˈli.a manoˈli.u]; 25 April 1932 – 9 January 1998) was a Romanian discus thrower who won one gold and two bronze Olympic medals. She was the first track and field athlete to compete at six Olympics (1952–1972).

== Early life; sports and education ==
As a teenager Manoliu competed at the national level in tennis, table tennis, volleyball and basketball, before turning to throwing events at the age of 16. Two years later she became the first Romanian woman to throw the disc over 40 m (41.44 m, 22 May 1950). In the mid-1950s she graduated from the Polytechnic Institute of Bucharest.

== International career ==
At the 1952 Summer Olympics in Helsinki, Manoliu finished 6th with a throw of 42.64 m. She bettered this distance in 1956 in Melbourne, throwing 43.90 m for a ninth-place finish. At the 1960 Olympics in Rome, she held the lead after the first round with a throw of 52.36 m, and although she was unable to improve it, the throw was sufficient to earn her the bronze medal.

Manoliu won the British WAAA Championships title in the discus throw event at the 1963 WAAA Championships.

At the 1964 Olympics in Tokyo, Manoliu was outside the podium after round four, but then she produced a throw of 56.96 m to gain her second Olympic bronze medal.

In the winter of 1967–68, the Romanian Athletics Federation informed the 35-year-old Manoliu that she was too old to try for the Olympics again and that she need not bother turning out for their training camp sessions. This only increased her determination, and after months of individual training, she qualified for the Mexico City Olympics. There, she carried an arm injury, and the team doctor warned her that she would not last more than one good throw. Manoliu threw 58.28 m on her first attempt, which proved good enough for the gold medal.

On 19 July 1969, Manoliu won the UK national WAAA discus title at the 1969 WAAA Championships at Crystal Palace and finished second behind Brenda Bedford in the shot put event.

In 1972, she finished 9th in the discus final at the 1972 Olympics with a throw of 58.50 m.

== After retirement ==
She retired shortly after the 1972 Games, and in 1974 was awarded the UNESCO Fair Play Prize, for her support to the ideals of fair and loyal competition.

From 1973 and until her death Manoliu served as vice-president and then as president (since 1990) of the Romanian Olympic Committee. In 1975 she was awarded the Olympic Order in bronze and in 1994 the International Olympic Committee Centennial Trophy. She was a member of the IAAF Women's Committee (1976–1995) and of the Romanian Senate in the 1990–1992 legislature.

== Death and legacy ==
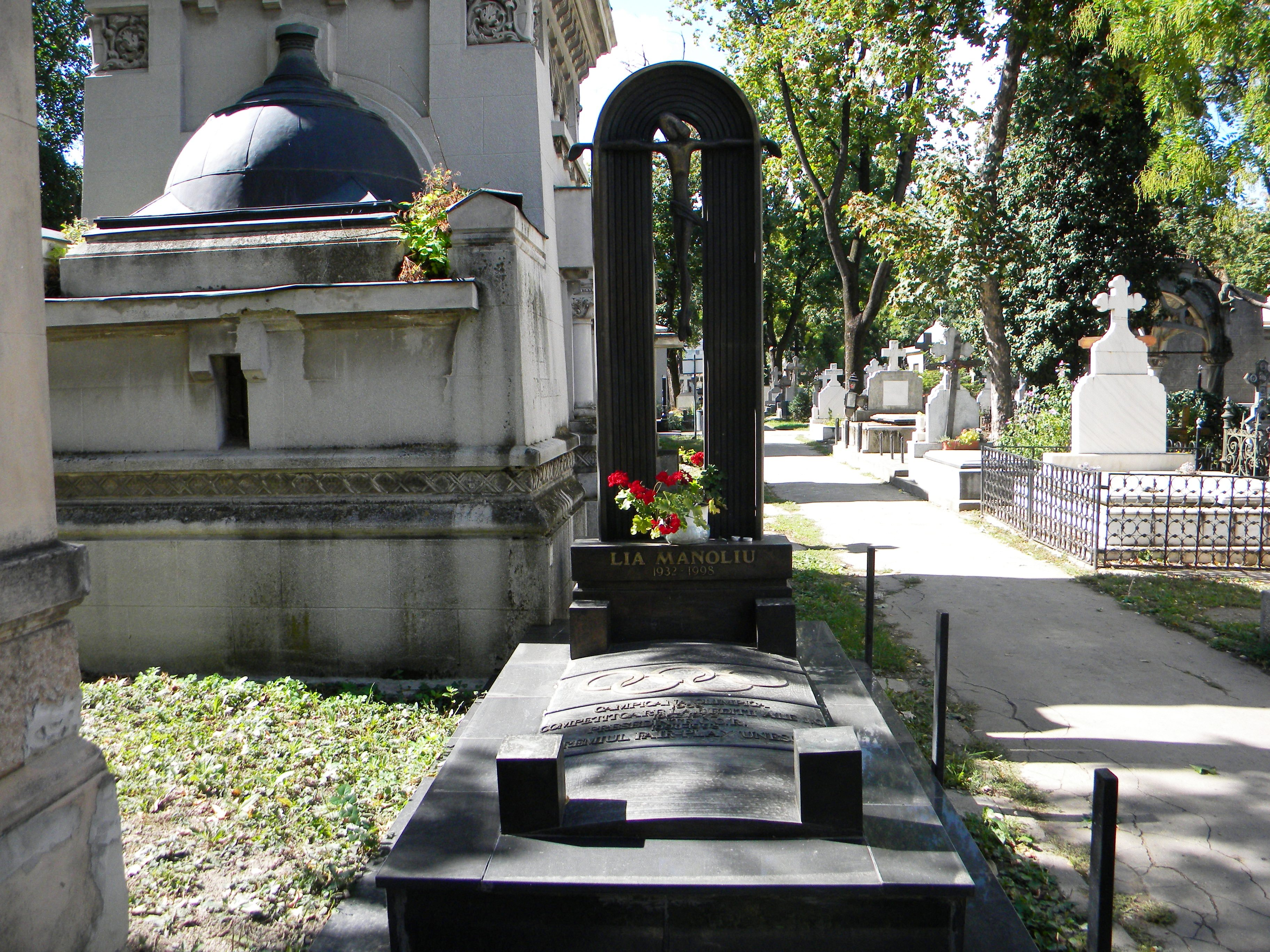
Grave of Lia Manoliu at Bellu Cemetery

She died of a heart attack in January 1998 after lapsing into a coma during surgery for a brain tumor the week before. She was buried at Bellu Cemetery. Until 2012 The National Stadium in Bucharest was named after her.

== See also ==
- List of athletes with the most appearances at Olympic Games
