= Deaths in March 2002 =

The following is a list of notable deaths in March 2002.

Entries for each day are listed alphabetically by surname. A typical entry lists information in the following sequence:

- Name, age, country of citizenship at birth, subsequent country of citizenship (if applicable), reason for notability, cause of death (if known), and reference.

== March 2002 ==
=== 1 ===
- John A. Blume, 92, American structural engineer, known as "the father of earthquake engineering".
- C. Farris Bryant, 87, American Governor (34th Governor of Florida from 1961 to 1965).
- John Challens, 86, British scientist and civil servant, helped develop Britain's first atomic bomb.
- David DiMeglio, 35, American professional wrestler, heart attack.
- Leigh Gerdine, 85, American musician, composer, and civic leader, heart attack.
- Rafael Lang, 92, Romanian-born Argentine boxer (1932).
- David Mann, 85, American songwriter.
- Bob Smith, 76, American professional football player (Brooklyn Dodgers, Detroit Lions).
- Hocine Soltani, 29, Algerian boxer, murdered.
- Doreen Waddell, 36, British soul singer (Soul II Soul), struck by vehicle.
- John Wieners, 68, American poet.
- Roger Wilson, 96, British Anglican prelate.

=== 2 ===
- Dionisio Aguilar, Mexican Olympic gymnast (1948).
- Andrés Archila, 88, Guatemalan violinist and music conductor.
- Kern Carson, 61, American football player (San Diego Chargers, New York Jets).
- Alvin Eicoff, 80, American advertising executive, known as a founder of direct response television advertising.
- Pasquale Giannattasio, 61, Italian sprinter and Olympian (1964).
- Finlay MacDonald, 79, Canadian senator, member of the Senate of Canada (1984-1998).
- Friedrich Gorenstein, 69, Russian-Jewish author and screenwriter.
- Don Haig, 68, Canadian filmmaker, editor, and producer.
- Jason Mayélé, 26, Congolese football player, traffic collision.
- Halfdan Rasmussen, 87, Danish poet.
- Fritz-Rudolf Schultz, 85, German army officer during World War II and politician.
- Alexei Yegorov, 26, Russian ice hockey player (San Jose Sharks), beating.

=== 3 ===
- Henry Nathaniel Andrews, 91, American paleobotanist.
- G. M. C. Balayogi, 50, Indian lawyer and politician, helicopter crash.
- Vijaya Bhaskar, 71, Indian music director and composer, heart attack.
- James Dunne, 60, British boxer and Olympian (1964).
- Marvin E. Frankel, 81, American judge (US district judge of the United States District Court for the Southern District of New York).
- Harlan Howard, 74, American country music songwriter ("I Fall to Pieces", "Busted", "Heartaches By The Number", "Why Not Me").
- Charles H. MacDonald, 87, American Air Force officer and a fighter ace during World War II.
- Fran McKee, 75, American Navy Rear Admiral.
- Al Pollard, 73, American gridiron football player (Army, New York Yanks, Philadelphia Eagles) and broadcaster, lymphoma.
- Roy Porter, 55, British historian and writer, heart attack.
- H. Keith Thompson, 79, American neo-Nazi and political writer..

=== 4 ===
- John A. Chapman, 36, US Air Force combat controller who was posthumously awarded the Medal of Honor.
- Eric Flynn, 62, British actor and singer (Ivanhoe, The Caesars, Freewheelers), cancer.
- Ryō Hanmura, 68, Japanese science fiction, fantasy, and horror author, pneumonia.
- Ugnė Karvelisehebeb, 66, Lithuanian writer and diplomat.
- Bernard Matemera, 56, Zimbabwean sculptor.
- Stephen McGonagle, 87, Northern Irish and Irish trade unionist.
- Elyne Mitchell, 88, Australian author.
- Prunella Ransome, 59, English actress, throat cancer.
- K. V. Raghunatha Reddy, 77, Indian politician.
- Shirley Ann Russell, 66, British costume designer, cancer.
- Velibor Vasović, 62, Serbian footballer and manager, heart attack.
- Jean Elizabeth Geiger Wright, 78, American conservationist, educator, and animal activist.

=== 5 ===
- Howard Cannon, 90, American politician (U.S. Senator from Nevada from 1959 to 1983).
- Stanisław Jankowski, 90, Polish SOE agent and resistance fighter during World War II.
- Surendra Jha 'Suman', 91, Indian poet, writer, publisher and politician, heart failure.
- Péter Kiss, 65, Hungarian mathematician.
- Pauline Elfriede Leps-Estam, 98, Estonian printmaker.
- Frances Macdonald, 87, English painter.
- Kai Outa, 71, Finnish Olympic weightlifter (1952).
- Clay Smith, 87, American baseball player (Cleveland Indians, Detroit Tigers).

=== 6 ===
- Piet Bannenberg, 91, Dutch Olympic swimmer (1928).
- Chuck Chapman, 90, Canadian Olympic basketball player (1936).
- Richard Kenneth Dell, 81, New Zealand malacologist.
- Bryan Fogarty, 32, Canadian ice hockey player (Quebec Nordiques, Pittsburgh Penguins, Montreal Canadiens), enlarged heart.
- Walter Goodman, 74, American author and journalist for The New York Times.
- David Jenkins, 89, Welsh librarian.
- Dan Jilek, 48, American football player (Buffalo Bills).
- Johnny Norlander, 81, American basketball player (Baltimore Bullets, Washington Capitols).
- Bill Radovich, 86, American gridiron football player (Detroit Lions), and film actor.
- Henry Rapoport, 83, American organic chemist and academic.
- Ralph Rumney, 67, English artist, cancer.
- Dietrich Schmidt, 82, German Luftwaffe night fighter ace during World War II.
- Elizabeth W. Stone, 83, American librarian and educator.
- Ernie Williamson, 79, American gridiron football player (Washington Redskins, New York Giants, Los Angeles Dons).
- Donald Wilson, 91, British television writer and producer (The Forsyte Saga, Doctor Who).

=== 7 ===
- Doris Twitchell Allen, 100, American child psychologist.
- Geoff Charles, 93, Welsh photojournalist.
- Daaf Drok, 87, Dutch football player.
- John Goodyear, 81, American gridiron football player (Washington Redskins).
- Troy Graham, 52, American professional wrestler, heart attack.
- Mickey Haslin, 92, American baseball player (Philadelphia Phillies, Boston Bees, New York Giants).
- Ian Vernon Hogg, 75, British author of books and biographies on military subjects.
- Mati Klarwein, 69, German painter, cancer.
- Franziska Rochat-Moser, 35, Swiss Olympic marathon runner (1992, 1996), avalanche .
- Charles H. Wright, 83, American physician, founder of the Charles H. Wright Museum of African American History.

=== 8 ===
- Justin Ahomadégbé-Tomêtin, 85, Beninese politician.
- Robin Anderson, 53, Australian documentary filmmaker, cancer.
- Al Bonniwell, 90, American basketball player (Akron Firestone Non-Skids).
- George F. Carrier, 83, American mathematician, esophageal cancer.
- Marțian Dan, 66, Romanian politician and university professor.
- Yury Gusov, 61, Russian Olympic welterweight freestyle wrestler (1972).
- Sanji Hase, 66, Japanese voice actor, lung cancer.
- Peter Holmes, 69, British businessman.
- Bill Johnson, 85, American football player (University of Minnesota, Green Bay Packers).
- Jansug Kakhidze, 66, Georgian musician, composer, singer and conductor.
- Santiago Lovell Jr., 60, Argentine Olympic boxer (1964).
- Winnie Markus, 80, Czechoslovakia-German actress, pneumonia.
- Ted Sepkowski, 78, American baseball player (Cleveland Indians, New York Yankees).
- Ellert Sölvason, 84, Icelandic football player.

=== 9 ===
- Denise Bosc, 85, French film actress.
- Carlos Casares, 60, Spanish Galician language writer, cardiac arrest.
- Mary Elmes, 93, Irish aid worker credited who saved over 200 Jewish children during World War II.
- Leonard Gershe, 79, American playwright, screenwriter, and lyricist, cerebrovascular disease.
- Hamish Henderson, 82, Scottish poet.
- Bora Spužić Kvaka, 67, Serbian vocalist and recording artist.
- Normand Lockwood, 95, American composer.
- Carol Los Mansmann, 59, American judge.
- Mohammad Paziraei, 72, Iranian Greco-Roman flyweight wrestler and Olympic medalist (1960).
- Oleg Trubachyov, 71, Soviet and Russian linguist.
- Sverre Zachariassen, 82, Norwegian footballer.

=== 10 ===
- Elguja Amashukeli, 73, Georgian sculptor and painter.
- Louise Carletti, 80, French film actress.
- Irán Eory, 64, Iranian-Mexican actress, stroke.
- Genevieve Fiore, 90, American women's rights and peace activist.
- George Fix, 62, American mathematician, cancer.
- Erik Lönnroth, 91, Swedish historian.
- George Mungwa, Zambian football coach.
- Vladimir Nakhabtsev, 63, Soviet cinematographer and actor.
- Gilmore Schjeldahl, 89, American businessman, Alzheimer's disease.
- Shirley Scott, 67, American jazz organist, heart failure.
- Howard Thompson, 82, American journalist and film critic, pneumonia.
- Irene Worth, 85, American actress (Tiny Alice, Sweet Bird of Youth, Lost in Yonkers), Tony winner (1965, 1976, 1991), stroke.

=== 11 ===
- Al Cowens, 50, American baseball player (Kansas City Royals, California Angels, Detroit Tigers, Seattle Mariners), heart attack.
- Marion Dönhoff, 92, German journalist and publisher of Die Zeit, known for opposing Hitler.
- Genevieve George, 74, Canadian baseball player.
- George Joseph Gottwald, 87, American prelate of the Roman Catholic Church.
- Rudolf Hell, 100, German inventor and manufacturer.
- Harry Jansson, 85, Swedish Olympic speed skater (1948).
- Willibald Jentschke, 90, Austrian-German nuclear physicist.
- Franjo Kuharić, 82, Croatian Catholic cardinal, cardiac arrest.
- Albert Ritserveldt, 86, Belgian racing cyclist.
- Herbert Spencer, 77, British designer, writer and photographer.
- Nicholas Gilman Thacher, 86, American diplomat, pulmonary fibrosis.
- James Tobin, 84, American economist, cerebrovascular disease.
- Carmela Toso, 89, Italian Olympic gymnast (1936).

=== 12 ===
- Louis-Marie Billé, 64, French Roman Catholic cardinal, cancer.
- Peter Blau, 84, American sociologist.
- Steve Gromek, 82, American baseball player (Cleveland Indians, Detroit Tigers).
- Hartini, 78, Indonesian wife of President Sukarno, heart disease
- Abdul Kadir, 57, Pakistani cricket player.
- John "Speedy" Keene, 56, English songwriter, vocalist, and drummer, heart failure.
- Spiros Kyprianou, 69, 2nd President of Cyprus, cancer.
- Jacqueline Patorni, 84, French tennis player.
- Heinz Pehlke, 79, Freelance German cinematographer in film and television.
- Vitaly Peskov, 57, Russian cartoonist.
- Jean Paul Riopelle, 78, Canadian painter and sculptor.
- Ben van der Voort, 87, Dutch Olympic cyclist (1936).

=== 13 ===
- Ivano Blason, 78, Italian football player.
- Hans-Georg Gadamer, 102, German philosopher.
- Abd al-Wahhab Hawmad, 87, Syrian politician, lawyer, and academic.
- Nasir Hussain, 75, Indian film producer, director, and screenwriter, cardiovascular disease.
- Jacques Jansen, 88, French baryton-martin singer.
- Lou Kahn, 86, American baseball player, manager, scout and coach.
- Bayliss Levrett, 88, American racecar driver from Jacksonville, Florida, Alzheimer's disease.
- Nick Mickoski, 74, Canadian ice hockey forward.
- Alice du Pont Mills, 89, American aviator.
- Marc Moreland, 44, American rock musician, kidney failure.
- Polly Riley, 75, American amateur golfer, cancer.
- Ri Tu-ik, 81, North Korean Army officer and politician.
- Hubert Wagner, 61, Polish volleyball player, coach, and Olympian (1968), traffic collision.

=== 14 ===
- Smail Balić, 81, Bosnian-Austrian historian, culturologist and scholar.
- Nelson Estupiñán Bass, 89, Ecuadorian writer, pneumonia.
- Kevin Danaher, 89, Irish folklorist and author on Irish traditional customs and beliefs.
- Karl Gratz, 83, Austrian-German Luftwaffe fighter ace during World War II.
- Leon L. Van Autreve, 82, American Army Sergeant Major.
- Antoine Verdu, 86, French Olympic weightlifter (1936).
- Cherry Wilder, 71, New Zealand writer, cancer.
- Thomas Winship, 81, American newspaper editor of the Boston Globe from 1965 until 1984.
- Henry Woods, 83, American district judge (United States District Court for the Eastern District of Arkansas).

=== 15 ===
- Yoshimitsu Aragaki, 51, Japanese Olympic boxer (1972).
- Tamala Krishna Goswami, 55, American Hare Krishna, car accident.
- Poul L. Hansen, 86, Danish footballer.
- Rand Holmes, 60, Canadian artist and illustrator, Hodgkin's lymphoma.
- Oscar Pérez, 79, Argentine Olympic basketball player (1948).
- Werner Unger, 70, German football player and Olympian (1964).
- Sylvester Weaver, 93, American television executive, credited with creating Today, Tonight, Home, Wide Wide World.
- Jairo Zulbarán, 32, Colombian football player and Olympian (1992), murdered.

=== 16 ===
- Kid Azteca, 88, Mexican boxer.
- Carmelo Bene, 64, Italian actor, director and screenwriter, cancer.
- Ricardo Bitancort, 29, Uruguayan footballer.
- Isaías Duarte Cancino, 63, Colombian Roman Catholic archbishop, killed by the FARC.
- Marcus Fox, 74, British politician (Member of Parliament for Shipley).
- Alfredo Goyeneche, 64, Spanish Olympic equestrian (1960).
- Salah-Hassan Hanifes, 89, Israeli politician.
- Umar Kayam, 69, Indonesian sociologist and writer, intestinal bleeding.
- Ernst Künnecke, 64, German football player and football coach.
- Danilo Stojković, 67, Serbian actor, lung cancer.
- Felipe Verdú, 74, Spanish Olympic boxer (1948).

=== 17 ===
- Arthur Altschul, 81, American banker.
- Lefty Bertrand, 93, American baseball player (Philadelphia Phillies).
- Bill Davis, 60, American football coach.
- Ernest E. Debs, 98, American politician, California State Assembly (1942–1947), L.A. County Supervisor (1958–1974).
- Rajammal P. Devadas, 82, Indian nutritionist and educator.
- Van Tien Dung, 84, Vietnamese general in the People's Army of Vietnam (PAVN).
- Georges Gorse, 87, French politician and diplomat.
- Rosetta LeNoire, 90, American actress (Family Matters, The Sunshine Boys, Brewster's Millions), diabetes.
- Vasil Mitkov, 58, Bulgarian football player.
- Luise Rinser, 90, German writer.
- Paul Runyan, 93, American golfer (two-time PGA Championship winner and a member of the World Golf Hall of Fame).
- Christian Graf von Krockow, 74, German writer and political scientist.
- William Witney, 86, American film and television director, known as a "B" movie action director.

=== 18 ===
- Don Betourne, 87, American basketball player.
- Dalton Camp, 81, Canadian journalist, political strategist, and commentator.
- Marcel Denis, 79, Belgian comic artist (Tif et Tondu).
- Rodolfo Falzoni, 76, Italian cyclist.
- Denis Forest, 41, Canadian actor, stroke.
- Mario Gariazzo, 71, Italian screenwriter and film director.
- R. A. Lafferty, 87, American science fiction writer.
- Van Leo, 80, Armenian-Egyptian photographer.
- Johnny Lombardi, 86, Canadian media tycoon and television producer/host.
- Gösta Winbergh, 58, Swedish operatic tenor, heart attack.

=== 19 ===
- Marco Biagi, 51, Italian jurist, homicide.
- Laura Bohannan, 80, American cultural anthropologist, heart attack.
- Kurt Czekalla, 71, German Olympic sport shooter (1968).
- John Patton, 66, American jazz, blues and R&B musician, complications from diabetes.
- David Beers Quinn, 92, Irish historian.
- Erkki Salmenhaara, 61, Finnish composer and musicologist.
- Bachtiar Siagian, 79, Indonesian film director and scriptwriter.
- Naren Tamhane, 70, Indian cricket player.
- Eduard Meine van Zinderen-Bakker, 94, Dutch-South African palynologist, stroke.

=== 20 ===
- Andra Akers, 58, American actress and philanthropist, complications following surgery.
- Ibn al-Khattab, 32, Saudi Arabian Saudi mujahid emir and terrorist, nerve agent poisoning.
- Giulio Alfieri, 77, Italian racing and production cars engineer, affiliated with Maserati .
- Samuel Warren Carey, 90, Australian geologist, an early advocate of continental drift.
- Eugene Figg, 65, American structural engineer, award-winning designer of dozens of bridges (Sunshine Skyway Bridge).
- George Macovescu, 88, Romanian writer and communist politician.
- Aleksei Yeskov, 57, Soviet football player and coach.

=== 21 ===
- David E. Blackmer, 75, American audio engineer, known as the inventor of the DBX noise reduction system and founder of dbx.
- James F. Blake, 89, American bus driver, antagonist for the Montgomery bus boycott, heart attack.
- Thomas Flanagan, 78, American professor and novelist.
- Horst Hauthal, 88, German ambassador.
- George Kiick, 84, American football player (Pittsburgh Steelers).
- Renée Massip, 94, French writer and journalist.
- Nikos Pangalos, 87, Greek football manager.
- Alain Pointet, 45, French Olympic sailor (1992).
- Eugene G. Rochow, 92, American inorganic chemist.
- Boris Sichkin, 79, Soviet and American film actor, dancer, choreographer, and entertainer.
- Herman Talmadge, 88, American politician.
- Ernest van den Haag, 87, Dutch-American sociologist, social critic, and author.

=== 22 ===
- Rudolf Baumgartner, 84, Swiss conductor, violinist, and music educator.
- Jaroslav Cejp, 77, Czechoslovak football player.
- Kingsford Dibela, 70, Governor-General of Papua New Guinea.
- Marcel Hansenne, 85, French middle distance runner and Olympic medalist (1948).
- Wilhelm Pankl, 86, Austrian Olympic weightlifter (1948).
- Hugh R. Stephen, 88, Canadian politician.

=== 23 ===
- Enzo Barboni, 79, Italian film director, cinematographer and screenwriter.
- John Biby, 90, American Olympic sailor (1932).
- Richard Bradford, 69, American novelist (Red Sky at Morning, So Far from Heaven).
- Antonio Calebotta, 71, Italian Olympic basketball player (1960).
- Jack Doolan, 82, American professional football player (Georgetown, New York Giants, Chicago Cardinals).
- Lloyd L. Duxbury, 80, American politician and member of the Minnesota House of Representatives.
- Eileen Farrell, 82, American soprano, performed both classical and popular music.
- Piara Singh Gill, 90, Indian nuclear physicist.
- Ben Hollioake, 24, English cricketer, car crash.
- Marcel Kint, 87, Belgian bicycle racer.
- Neal E. Miller, 92, American psychologist.
- Minnie Rojas, 68, Cuban-American baseball player (California Angels).
- Richard Sylbert, 73, American film production designer and art director (Who's Afraid of Virginia Woolf?, Dick Tracy, Chinatown), Oscar winner (1967, 1991), cancer.
- Leif Wager, 80, Finnish actor.

=== 24 ===
- Dick Bittner, 80, American ice hockey player (Boston Bruins).
- Beverly Bower, 76, American operatic soprano (New York City Opera, Metropolitan Opera), cancer.
- Mace Brown, 92, American baseball player (Pittsburgh Pirates, Brooklyn Dodgers, Boston Red Sox).
- Dorothy DeLay, 84, American violin instructor, cancer.
- César Milstein, 74, Argentinian biochemist.
- Wayne Molis, 58, American basketball player (New York Knicks, Oakland Oaks, Houston Mavericks), stroke.
- Erik Møller, 92, Danish architect.
- Bob Said, 69, American racing driver.

=== 25 ===
- Kevin Barry, 81, Irish Olympic equestrian (1956).
- Ronald Verlin Cassill, 82, American writer, editor, painter and lithographer.
- Eduardo Lim, 71, Filipino basketball player and Olympian (1952, 1956).
- Ken Traill, 75, British rugby league player.
- Kenneth Wolstenholme, 81, British football commentator.
- Hilde Zimmermann, 81, member of the Austrian Resistance during WWII.

=== 26 ===
- Randy Castillo, 51, American musician, Ozzy Osbourne and Mötley Crüe drummer, skin cancer.
- Miguel Godoy, 95, Peruvian Olympic basketball player (1936).
- Hugh Davis Graham, 65, American historian, sociologist, civil rights scholar and author.
- Louis M. Heyward, 81, American producer and film and television writer (The Ernie Kovacs Show, Winky Dink and You), pneumonia.
- Gerald Hylkema, 56, Dutch footballer.
- Ray Kemp, 94, American football player (Pittsburgh Pirates).
- Eugen Meier, 71, Swiss footballer.
- Taisto Sinisalo, 75, Finnish communist politician, leader of the Communist Party of Finland.
- Heinz Welzel, 90, German actor.
- Whitey Wietelmann, 83, American baseball player (Boston Bees/Braves, Pittsburgh Pirates) and coach.

=== 27 ===
- Teofila Băiașu, 74, Romanian gymnast and Olympian (1952).
- Milton Berle, 93, American comedian dubbed "Uncle Miltie" and "Mr. Television" (Texaco Star Theater, The Milton Berle Show), colorectal cancer.
- Giorgi Melikishvili, 83, Georgian historian.
- Dudley Moore, 66, British actor and writer (Foul Play, 10, Arthur), pneumonia.
- Cecil Pearce, 87, Australian Olympic rower (1936).
- Glen Robinson, 87, American special and visual effects artist, six-time Academy Award winner.
- Tadeusz Rut, 70, Polish Olympic hammer thrower (1956, 1960, 1964).
- Geoffrey Sim, 90, New Zealand politician.
- Jess Stearn, 87, American journalist and author of more than thirty books, nine of which were bestsellers, heart failure.
- Sture Stork, 71, Swedish Olympic sailor (1956, 1964).
- Lotte Ulbricht, 98, East Germany official and second wife of Walter Ulbricht, fall.
- Billy Wilder, 95, Austrian-American film director and screenwriter (Double Indemnity, The Apartment, Some Like It Hot), six-time Oscar winner, pneumonia.

=== 28 ===
- Tofail Ahmed, 83, Bangladeshi researcher of Folk Art.
- Clarence B. Craft, 80, U.S. Army soldier and a recipient of the Medal of Honor.
- Klaus Croissant, 70, East German lawyer of the Red Army Faction and later spy and a political activist.
- Tikka Khan, 86, Pakistani army general.
- Francis Newton Souza, 77, British artist.
- Albert Whitford, 96, American physicist and astronomer, dean of modern photoelectric photometry.

=== 29 ===
- Henning Bahs, 74, Danish screenwriter and special effects designer.
- John Cameron, 84, Australian baritone opera singer.
- James T. Cushing, 65, American professor of physics, philosophy, and the history and philosophy of science.
- Franklin S. Forsberg, 96, American publisher and diplomat (U.S. Ambassador to Sweden).
- Eberhard Mehl, 66, German fencer and Olympic medalist (1960, 1964).
- Jim Salsbury, 69, American football player (Detroit Lions, Green Bay Packers).
- Rico Yan, 27, Filipino model and actor, acute pancreatitis.

=== 30 ===
- Anand Bakshi, 71, Indian poet and lyricist.
- Queen Elizabeth, The Queen Mother, 101, British consort of King George VI, pneumonia.
- Jean Pictet, 87, Swiss jurist and legal practitioner.
- Ivan Simonsson, 78, Swedish Olympic rower (1952).
- Bjørn Spydevold, 83, Norwegian football player, manager, and Olympian (1952).
- Alfie Stokes, 69, British footballer.

=== 31 ===
- Richard Ackerschott, 80, German footballer.
- Yara Bernette, 82, Brazilian classical pianist, heart attack.
- Lady Anne Brewis, 91, English botanist.
- Alec Hannan, 86, South African Olympic boxer (1936).
- Edgardo Madinabeytia, 69, Argentine football goalkeeper.
- Eugene Pennell, 91, Canadian Olympic sailor (1956).
- Lucio D. San Pedro, 89, Filipino composer and teacher, cardiac arrest.
- Barry Took, 73, English writer, television presenter and comedian, cancer.
