= Deaths in April 1998 =

The following is a list of notable deaths in April 1998.

Entries for each day are listed alphabetically by surname. A typical entry lists information in the following sequence:

- Name, age, country of citizenship at birth, subsequent country of citizenship (if applicable), reason for notability, cause of death (if known), and reference.

== April 1998 ==
=== 1 ===
- Theodore Bloomfield, 74, American conductor, heart attack.
- Gene Evans, 75, American actor, heart failure.
- Anne Gullestad, 72, Norwegian actress and theatre director.
- Janusz Nasfeter, 77, Polish film director, screenwriter and writer.
- Lucille Norman, 76, American actress, mezzo-soprano and radio personality.
- Robert Ogle, 69, Canadian Roman Catholic priest and politician.
- Igor Ostashov, 60, Soviet Russian Olympic speed skater (1964).
- Dave Smith, 83, American baseball player (Philadelphia Athletics).
- Johnny Stevenson, 84, American basketball player.
- Mary Wynne Warner, 65, Welsh mathematician.
- Rozz Williams, 34, American singer, poet and artist, suicide by hanging.

=== 2 ===
- Joan Austin, 95, British tennis player.
- Dai Davies, 88, Welsh trade unionist.
- Ronnie Dix, 85, English football player.
- Hans Eberle, 72, German football player and Olympian (1952).
- Jock Gaynor, 68, American television actor and producer.
- Eberhard Rees, 89, German-American rocketry pioneer and NASA executive.
- Jackie Sardou, 78, French actress.
- Frank Steen, 84, American football player (Green Bay Packers).
- Alf Westman, 77, Swedish Olympic hurdler (1948).

=== 3 ===
- Mary Cartwright, 97, British mathematician.
- Caroline Fletcher, 91, American Olympic diver (1924).
- Elmer Iseler, 70, Canadian choir conductor and choral editor.
- Givi Kartozia, 69, Georgian middleweight Greco-Roman wrestler and Olympic champion (1956, 1960).
- Charles Lang, 96, American cinematographer (Some Like It Hot, A Farewell to Arms, Sabrina), Oscar winner (1934), pneumonia.
- Harkisan Mehta, 69, Indian author and journalist, heart attack.
- Rolf Olsen, 78, Austrian actor, screenwriter and film director, cancer.
- Rob Pilatus, 33, German model, dancer and singer (Milli Vanilli), accidental overdose.
- Herbert B. Powell, 94, United States Army general and diplomat.
- Jean-Pierre Roche, 73, Swiss Olympic field hockey player (1948, 1952).
- Josef Staudinger, 91, Austrian diver and Olympian (1928, 1932).
- John W. Sweeterman, 91, American newspaperman.
- Alvin Tyler, 72, American R&B and jazz musician.
- Wolf Vostell, 65, German painter and sculptor.

=== 4 ===
- Harry Wesley Bass Jr., 71, American businessman, coin collector and philanthropist.
- George Berry, 84, Australian politician.
- Kate Bosse-Griffiths, 87, German-British egyptologist.
- Marshall Fredericks, 90, American sculptor.
- Kay Hughes, 84, American actress.
- Pierre Lantier, 87, French composer and pianist.
- Predrag Milinković, 64, Serbian actor.
- Ian Percival, 76, British politician.
- Ganesh Prasad Rijal, 77, Nepali politician, heart attack.
- Ángel Schandlein, 67, Argentine footballer.

=== 5 ===
- Nick Forkovitch, 79, American football player (Brooklyn Dodgers).
- Charles Frank, 87, British theoretical physicist.
- Mick Miller, 61, Australian Aboriginal activist and politician, heart seizure.
- Elizabeth Mitchell, 79, New Zealand fencer.
- Cozy Powell, 50, English rock drummer (Rainbow, Whitesnake, Emerson, Lake & Powell, Black Sabbath), traffic collision.

=== 6 ===
- Edgar Ablowich, 84, American athlete and Olympian (1932).
- Reuben Berry, 63, American gridiron football coach.
- Sam Chaffey, 63, New Zealand Olympic alpine skier (1960).
- Rudy Dhaenens, 36, Belgian road bicycle racer, traffic collision.
- Helen Craig McCullough, 80, American academic, translator and japanologist.
- Heinz Neuhaus, 71, German boxer and heavyweight champion.
- Antonio Randi, 77, Italian Olympic wrestler (1952).
- Dewey Soriano, 78, American baseball executive.
- Wendy O. Williams, 48, American singer, songwriter, and actress, suicide by gunshot.
- John Wyatt, 63, American baseball player, heart attack.
- Tammy Wynette, 55, American country music singer-songwriter, heart arrhythmia, heart attack.

=== 7 ===
- Muhammad Karam Shah al-Azhari, 79, Pakistani Islamic scholar.
- Modesta Bor, 71, Venezuelan composer.
- Luis Díez del Corral, 86, Spanish jurist, writer and political scientist.
- Vitaly Galkov, 58, Soviet and Russian sprint canoer and Olympian (1968).
- Sirous Ghayeghran, 36, Iranian football player, traffic collision.
- John Kasper, 69, American Ku Klux Klan member and segregationist, boating accident.
- Ronald William John Keay, 77, British botanist, cancer.
- Ibrahim Khalil, 88-89, Egyptian Olympic diver (1936).
- John Larking, 76, English cricketer.
- Pancho Magalona, 76, Filipino actor, emphysema.
- Nick Auf der Maur, 55, Canadian journalist and politician, esophageal cancer.
- James McIntosh Patrick, 91, Scottish painter.
- Paul Sarringhaus, 77, American gridiron football player (Chicago Cardinals, Detroit Lions).
- Alex Schomburg, 92, Puerto Rican comic-book artist and painter.
- Carlos Vega, 41, Cuban-American session drummer, suicide by gunshot.
- S. V. Venkatraman, 86, Indian actor, singer and music director.

=== 8 ===
- Anatole Dauman, 73, French film producer.
- Charlie Drinkwater, 83, English football player and manager.
- Lee Elias, 77, British-American comics artist.
- Florence Virginia Foose Wilson Mayberry, 91, American writer and Baháʼí Faith convert.
- René Pellos, 98, French artist, cartoonist, writer, and Olympian (1928).
- Kurt Weinreich, 89, German football manager.

=== 9 ===
- Tom Cora, 44, American cellist and composer, melanoma.
- Mihai Grecu, 81, Moldovan painter.
- Vishnu Bhikaji Kolte, 89, Indian writer.
- Lü Shuxiang, 93, Chinese linguist, lexicographer and educator.
- Ronald Vernon Southcott, 79, Australian medical zoologist.
- Aleksey Spiridonov, 46, Soviet athlete and Olympic medalist (1976).
- John Tate, 43, American heavyweight boxer and Olympian (1976), traffic collision.
- David Vigor, 58, Australian politician, heart attack.

=== 10 ===
- Archbishop Serafim of Athens, 84, Greek archbishop.
- Alan Burgess, 83, English RAF pilot and author.
- Jean Chapot, 67, French screenwriter and film director.
- Campos de Carvalho, 81, Brazilian writer.
- Dieter Erler, 58, German footballer.
- Basil James, 77, American jockey.
- Charles Kessler, 87, Swiss Olympic ice hockey player (1936).
- Zezé Moreira, 90, Brazilian footballer and coach.
- Nguyen Co Thach, 76, Vietnamese revolutionary, diplomat, and politician.
- Horst Scheeser, 85, Romanian Olympic alpine skier (1936).

=== 11 ===
- Lillian Briggs, 65, American rock 'n roll musician, lung cancer.
- Pierre Cottier, 89, Swiss Olympic weightlifter (1936).
- Francis Durbridge, 85, English playwright and author.
- Tex Geddes, 78, Scottish author and adventurer.
- Rodney Harvey, 30, American actor, model and dancer, drug overdose.
- Leland Clure Morton, 82, American district judge (United States District Court for the Middle District of Tennessee).
- Kristaq Rama, 66, Albanian sculptor, art educator and politician.
- Ivan Tcherepnin, 55, French-American composer.
- Doris Tetzlaff, 77, American baseball player.
- Rover Thomas, 72, Aboriginal Australian artist.

=== 12 ===
- Xin Fengxia, Chinese pingju opera performer, cerebral hemorrhage.
- Robert Ford, 83, Canadian poet and diplomat.
- Dorothea Jameson, 77, American cognitive psychologist, lung cancer.
- Frederick Lenz, 48, American businessman and spiritual teacher, suicide by drowning.
- Felicitas Mendez, Puerto Rican-American civil right activist, heart failure.
- Bruno Rodzik, 62, French football player.
- Charles Sibley, 80, American ornithologist and molecular biologist.
- Marvin Wolfgang, 73, American sociologist and criminologist.

=== 13 ===
- Alec Albiston, 80, Australian rules footballer and coach.
- Jack Bolling, 81, American baseball player (Philadelphia Phillies, Brooklyn Dodgers).
- Randy Brown, 54, American baseball player (California Angels).
- Patrick de Gayardon, 38, French skydiver and skysurfing pioneer, skydiving accident.
- Nyta Dover, 70, Swiss actress.
- David Foster, 43, Irish equestrian and Olympian (1984, 1988, 1996).
- Bahi Ladgham, 85, Tunisian politician and Prime minister.
- Ian MacGregor, 85, Scottish-American metallurgist and industrialist.
- Pat Rainey, 72, American singer and actress.
- Jack Vard, 71, Irish wrestler and Olympian (1952).

=== 14 ===
- Roberts Bluķis, 85, Latvian basketball, ice hockey player, and Olympian (1936).
- Jake Colhouer, 76, American gridiron football player (Chicago Cardinals, New York Giants).
- Brian Crago, 71, Australian Olympic equestrian (1956, 1960).
- Weldon Humble, 76, American gridiron football player (Cleveland Browns, Dallas Texans).
- Harry Lee, 90, British tennis player.
- Dorothy Squires, 83, Welsh singer, lung cancer.
- Maurice Stans, 90, American civil servant and politician, congestive heart failure.

=== 15 ===
- William Congdon, 86, American painter.
- Pompeo D'Ambrosio, 81, Italian-Venezuelan businessman.
- Kenny Duckett, 38, American football player (New Orleans Saints, Dallas Cowboys), renal failure.
- William K. Jones, 81, United States Marine Corps lieutenant general.
- Rose Maddox, 72, American country singer-songwriter.
- Pol Pot, 72, Cambodian politician. General secretary of the CPK
- Kayo Wnorowski, 76, American basketball player.

=== 16 ===
- Kazimieras Antanavičius, 60, Lithuanian economist and politician.
- Djibo Bakary, 76, Nigerian nationalist and politician.
- Alberto Calderón, 77, Argentinian mathematician.
- Fernande Caroen, 77, Belgian freestyle swimmer and Olympian (1948).
- Leif Dahlgren, 92, Swedish athlete and Olympian (1936).
- Fred Davis, 84, English snooker and billiards player.
- Marie-Louise Meilleur, 117, Canadian supercentenarian, oldest living person at the time of her death.
- Ronald Millar, 78, English actor, scriptwriter, and dramatist.
- Esko Salminen, 77, Finnish Olympic field hockey player (1952).

=== 17 ===
- Michael Agbamuche, 77, Nigerian Attorney General and politician.
- Alberto Bovone, 75, Italian cardinal of the Catholic Church.
- Frances Clark, 93, American pianist, pedagogue, and academic.
- Geraldo de Barros, 75, Brazilian painter and photographer.
- Linda McCartney, 56, American musician, photographer and animal rights activist, breast cancer.
- William C. Scott, 76, Canadian politician.

=== 18 ===
- Stoffel Botha, 69, South African politician, heart attack.
- Ferenc Deák, 76, Hungarian football player.
- William Edmondson, 91, American sound engineer (Butch Cassidy and the Sundance Kid, The Twilight Zone, Vanishing Point).
- Nelson Gonçalves, 78, Brazilian singer and songwriter, heart attack.
- Johan Richter, 73, Danish architect and engineer.
- Terry Sanford, 80, American university administrator and politician, esophageal cancer.
- Linda Schele, 55, American Mesoamerican archaeologist, pancreatic cancer.
- Walter Sessi, 79, American baseball player (St. Louis Cardinals).

=== 19 ===
- Gardner Dickinson, 70, American golfer.
- J.C. Harrington, 96, American historical archaeologist.
- Denis Howell, Baron Howell, 74, British politician.
- Octavio Paz, 84, Mexican diplomat and writer, Nobel Prize laureate, cancer.
- Vladimir Sokolov, 70, Russian scientist.
- Liam Sullivan, 74, American actor and singer, heart attack.

=== 20 ===
- Severo Cominelli, 82, Italian football player.
- Trevor Huddleston, 84, English Anglican bishop.
- Yoshio Inaba, 77, Japanese actor (Seven Samurai), heart attack.
- Alfredo Palacio Moreno, 85, Ecuadorian sculptor and painter.
- Othmar Wessely, 75, Austrian musicologist and university teacher.

=== 21 ===
- Ivan Chtcheglov, 65, French political theorist, activist and poet.
- Rabi Das, Indian footballer and Olympian (1948).
- Peter Lind Hayes, 82, American vaudeville entertainer, songwriter and actor, vascular problems.
- Vernon Holland, 49, American gridiron football player (Cincinnati Bengals, Detroit Lions and New York Giants), heart attack.
- Egill Jacobsen, 87, Danish painter.
- Jean-François Lyotard, 73, French philosopher and sociologist, leukemia.
- Gábor Preisich, 88, Hungarian architect.
- Bruno Roth, 86, German racing cyclist.
- Irene Vernon, 76, American actress, congestive heart failure and coronary artery disease.
- Helen Ward, 84, American jazz singer.
- Frank Wootton, 86, British aviation artist.

=== 22 ===
- Edward Brongersma, 86, Dutch politician and doctor of law, voluntary euthanasia.
- Kitch Christie, 58, South African rugby coach, leukemia.
- Alfredo da Motta, 77, Brazilian basketball player and Olympian (1948, 1952).
- Carlo Donida, 77, Italian composer and pianist.
- Helena Dow, 80, American Olympic fencer (1948).
- Guy Henn, 88, Australian doctor and politician.
- Vadym Hetman, 62, Ukrainian statesman and banker, shot.
- León Najnudel, 56, Argentine basketball player and basketball coach, leukemia.
- Georges Paillard, 94, French cyclist and Olympian (1920).
- Régine Pernoud, 88, French historian and archivist.
- Shalimar Seiuli, 21, American-Samoan transgender dancer, accidental fall.
- Norm Wagner, 86, American basketball player.
- Marvin Worth, 72, American film producer, screenwriter and actor, lung cancer.

=== 23 ===
- Hattie Moseley Austin, 97-98, African-American entrepreneur, restaurateur
- Konstantinos Karamanlis, 91, Greek politician, Prime Minister and President.
- James Earl Ray, 70, American convict and assassin of Martin Luther King Jr., liver failure.
- Héctor Rensonnet, 73, Argentine Olympic weightlifter (1952).
- Sartaj Singh, Indian Army general.
- Red Stacy, 86, American gridiron football player (Detroit Lions).
- Gregor von Rezzori, 83, Austrian-Romanian journalist, actor, writer and art collector.

=== 24 ===
- Froduald Karamira, 50, Rwandan politician, execution by firing squad.
- Yakov Malkiel, 83, Russian-American etymologist and philologist.
- Mel Powell, 75, American composer and winner of the Pulitzer Prize, liver cancer.
- Christiane Rochefort, 80, French feminist writer.
- Leslie Stevens, 74, American producer, writer and director, angioplasty.

=== 25 ===
- Jorge Dominichi, 51, Argentine football player and manager, heart attack.
- Wright Morris, 88, American novelist, photographer and essayist, esophageal cancer.
- Christian Mortensen, 115, Danish-American supercentenarian, Alzheimer's disease.
- Don Petersen, 70, American playwright and screenwriter.
- Dave Ross, 80, Australian rugby league footballer.
- Stanley Brehaut Ryerson, 87, Canadian historian, educator, political activist.

=== 26 ===
- Alan Boxer, 81, British Royal Air Force officer.
- Theodor Broch, 94, Norwegian lawyer and politician.
- Juan José Gerardi Conedera, 75, Guatemalan Roman Catholic bishop and human rights activist, bludgeoned.
- David Fasold, 59, United States Merchant Marine officer and salvage expert, cancer.
- Gamini Jayasuriya, 73, Sri Lankan politician.
- Sven Olov Lindholm, 95, Swedish anti-communist and Nazi politician.
- Gabe Paul, 88, American Major League Baseball executive.
- Arif Pašalić, 54, Bosnian military officer, traffic collision.
- Ivy May Pearce, 83, Australian aerobatic pilot.
- Billy Strachan, 77, British communist, civil rights activist, and pilot.

=== 27 ===
- John W. H. Bassett, 82, Canadian media proprietor and politician.
- Carlos Castañeda, 72, American author, hepatocellular cancer.
- Ramakant Desai, 58, Indian cricketer.
- Anne Desclos, 90, French journalist and novelist.
- Edris Eckhardt, 93, American artist.
- John Kennedy, 71, American baseball player (Philadelphia Phillies).
- Nguyễn Văn Linh, 82, Vietnamese revolutionary and politician, liver cancer.
- Louis S. Peterson, 75, American playwright, actor, screenwriter and professor, lung cancer.
- Ralph Raphael, 77, British organic chemist, ischaemic heart disease.
- Browning Ross, 74, American long-distance runner and Olympian (1948, 1952).
- Geoffrey Serle, 76, Australian historian.

=== 28 ===
- Jerome Bixby, 75, American short story writer and scriptwriter.
- Frank Damiani, 75, American football player (New York Giants), and coach.
- Ramakant Desai, 58, Indian cricket player, complications following cardiac arrest.
- Roger Eason, 79, American gridiron football player (Cleveland/Los Angeles Rams, Green Bay Packers).
- Dorothy Lovett, 83, American film actress.
- Reed C. Rollins, 86, American botanist and professor.
- Mum Shirl, 76, Australian Wiradjuri humanitarian activist.
- Bogdan Sirotanović, 82, Croatian Olympic rower (1948).

=== 29 ===
- Ron Blackburn, 63, American baseball player (Pittsburgh Pirates).
- Mary Castle, 67, American actress, lung cancer.
- Charley Cowan, 59, American gridiron football player (Los Angeles Rams).
- Mário de Castro, 92, Brazilian footballer.
- Harold Devine, 88, American boxer and Olympian (1928).
- V. Gopalakrishnan, Indian actor.
- Hal Laycoe, 75, Canadian ice hockey player (New York Rangers, Montreal Canadiens, Boston Bruins), and coach.

=== 30 ===
- Guy Anderson, 91, American painter.
- Curly Chalker, 66, American pedal steel guitarist, brain tumor.
- Lise Gervais, 64, Canadian abstract painter and sculptor.
- Edwin Thompson Jaynes, 75, American physicist and statistician.
- Daniel V. Jones, 40, American maintenance worker, suicide by gunshot.
- Vora Mackintosh, 68, British Olympic alpine skier (1952).
- Nizar Qabbani, 75, Syrian diplomat, poet and publisher, heart attack.
- Jopie Selbach, 79, Dutch freestyle swimmer and Olympian (1936).
