= 1998 in film =

Many significant films were released in 1998, including Shakespeare in Love, Saving Private Ryan, Armageddon, American History X, The Truman Show, Primary Colors, Rushmore, Rush Hour, Lethal Weapon 4, There's Something About Mary, The Big Lebowski, and Terrence Malick's directorial return in The Thin Red Line.

== Highest-grossing films ==
The top 10 films released in 1998 by worldwide gross are as follows:

Highest-grossing films of 1998
Rank	Title	Distributor	Worldwide gross
1	Armageddon	Buena Vista	$553,709,788
2	Saving Private Ryan	DreamWorks / Paramount	$482,352,390
3	Godzilla	Sony / TriStar	$379,014,294
4	There's Something About Mary	20th Century Fox	$369,884,651
5	A Bug's Life	Buena Vista	$363,398,565
6	Deep Impact	Paramount / DreamWorks	$349,464,664
7	Mulan	Buena Vista	$304,320,254
8	Dr. Dolittle	20th Century Fox	$294,456,605
9	Shakespeare in Love	Miramax / Universal	$289,317,794
10	Lethal Weapon 4	Warner Bros.	$285,444,603

=== Box office records ===
- Armageddon achieved Touchstone Pictures' highest-grossing domestic opening weekend with $36 million grossed domestically. It later went on to become Touchstone Pictures' highest grossing film to date, overtaking Pretty Woman.
- Saving Private Ryan grossed $482 million worldwide, becoming the highest-grossing World War II film until it was surpassed by Dunkirk (2017). However, when both are adjusted for 2025 inflation, Saving Private Ryan grossed approximately $888 million worldwide compared to Dunkirk's approximately $709 million worldwide.
- Blade became the top-grossing film based on a Marvel Comics character, grossing $131.2 million worldwide at the time of its release.
- The Star Trek franchise became the seventh film franchise to gross $1 billion with the release of Star Trek: Insurrection.

== Events ==
- March 1 – Titanic becomes the first film to gross over $1 billion at the worldwide box office. Twenty days later, the film won 11 Academy Awards, including Best Picture.
- May 8 and July 1 – 1998 saw the release of two dueling science-fiction disaster films about asteroids: Armageddon and Deep Impact, both of which became box office successes. Armageddon became the more popular of the two and was also the highest-grossing film of 1998 worldwide.
- July 24 – Saving Private Ryan, directed by Steven Spielberg, was released and received critical acclaim, leading it to be the top-grossing domestic film of 1998. Saving Private Ryan won five Academy Awards, including Best Director. The film was lauded as an influential landmark in the war and action film genres, primarily due to its use of desaturated colors, hand-held cameras, and tight angles.
- August 21 – Blade, based on the character of the same name, grossed over $131.2 million worldwide. Its success would help stage future film adaptations of Marvel Comics.
- September 19 – Antz, DreamWorks' first animated feature film, premiered at the 23rd Toronto International Film Festival.
- October 23 - Gary Ross makes his directorial debut with Pleasantville.
- December 25 – Filmmaker Terrence Malick returned after a 20-year hiatus, with The Thin Red Line.

== Awards ==
Category/Organization	56th Golden Globe Awards January 24, 1999		4th Critics Choice Awards January 1999	Producers, Directors, Screen Actors, and Writers Guild Awards	71st Academy Awards March 21, 1999	52nd BAFTA Awards April 11, 1999
Category/Organization	Drama	Musical or Comedy	4th Critics Choice Awards January 1999	Producers, Directors, Screen Actors, and Writers Guild Awards	71st Academy Awards March 21, 1999	52nd BAFTA Awards April 11, 1999
Best Film	Saving Private Ryan	Shakespeare in Love	Saving Private Ryan		Shakespeare in Love	
Best Director	Steven Spielberg; Saving Private Ryan					Peter Weir; The Truman Show
Best Actor	Jim Carrey; The Truman Show	Michael Caine; Little Voice	Ian McKellen; Gods and Monsters; Apt Pupil	Roberto Benigni; Life Is Beautiful		
Best Actress	Cate Blanchett; Elizabeth	Gwyneth Paltrow; Shakespeare in Love	Cate Blanchett; Elizabeth	Gwyneth Paltrow; Shakespeare in Love		Cate Blanchett; Elizabeth
Best Supporting Actor	Ed Harris; The Truman Show		Billy Bob Thornton; A Simple Plan	Robert Duvall; A Civil Action	James Coburn; Affliction	Geoffrey Rush; Shakespeare in Love
Best Supporting Actress	Lynn Redgrave; Gods and Monsters		Kathy Bates; Primary Colors; Joan Allen; Pleasantville	Kathy Bates; Primary Colors	Judi Dench; Shakespeare in Love	
Best Screenplay, Adapted	Marc Norman and Tom Stoppard; Shakespeare in Love		Scott B. Smith; A Simple Plan	Scott Frank; Out of Sight	Bill Condon; Gods and Monsters	Elaine May; Primary Colors
Best Screenplay, Original	Marc Norman and Tom Stoppard; Shakespeare in Love		Marc Norman and Tom Stoppard; Shakespeare in Love			Andrew Niccol; The Truman Show
Best Animated Film	—N/a	—N/a	A Bug's Life / The Prince of Egypt (TIE)	—N/a	—N/a	—N/a
Best Original Score	The Truman Show; Burkhard Dallwitz and Philip Glass		Saving Private Ryan; John Williams	N/A	Life Is Beautiful; Nicola Piovani	Elizabeth; David Hirschfelder
Best Original Song	"The Prayer"; Quest for Camelot		"When You Believe"; The Prince of Egypt	N/A	"When You Believe"; The Prince of Egypt	N/A
Best Foreign Language Film	Central Station		Life Is Beautiful	N/A	Life Is Beautiful	Central Station

Palme d'Or (Cannes Film Festival):

Eternity and a Day (Mia aioniótita kai mia méra), directed by Theo Angelopoulos, Greece

Golden Lion (Venice Film Festival):

The Way We Laughed, directed by Gianni Amelio, Italy

Golden Bear (Berlin Film Festival):

Central Station, directed by Walter Salles, Brazil / France

People's Choice Award (Toronto International Film Festival):

Life Is Beautiful (La vita è bella), directed by Roberto Benigni, Italy

== 1998 films ==
=== By country/region ===
- List of American films of 1998
- List of Argentine films of 1998
- List of Australian films of 1998
- List of Bangladeshi films of 1998
- List of British films of 1998
- List of Canadian films of 1998
- List of French films of 1998
- List of Hong Kong films of 1998
- List of Indian films of 1998
  - List of Hindi films of 1998
  - List of Kannada films of 1998
  - List of Malayalam films of 1998
  - List of Marathi films of 1998
  - List of Tamil films of 1998
  - List of Telugu films of 1998
- List of Japanese films of 1998
- List of Mexican films of 1998
- List of Pakistani films of 1998
- List of Russian films of 1998
- List of South Korean films of 1998
- List of Spanish films of 1998

=== By genre/medium ===
- List of action films of 1998
- List of animated feature films of 1998
- List of avant-garde films of 1998
- List of crime films of 1998
- List of comedy films of 1998
- List of drama films of 1998
- List of horror films of 1998
- List of science fiction films of 1998
- List of thriller films of 1998
- List of western films of 1998

== Births ==
- January 1
  - Saura Lightfoot-Leon, Dutch-born English-Spanish actress
  - Lara Robinson, Australian actress
- January 4
  - Coco Jones, American actress/singer
  - Liza Soberano, Filipino actress
  - Julia McDermott, American actress
- January 5 – Marie Iitoyo, Japanese model and actress
- January 9
  - Kerris Dorsey, American actress and singer
  - Brent Rivera, American actor and YouTuber
- January 12
  - Nathan Gamble, American actor
  - Ally Ioannides, American actress
- January 15 – Ben Levi Ross, American actor and singer
- January 16
  - Curran Walters, American actor
  - Yerin Ha, Australian actress
- January 18 – Shin Ye-eun, South Korean actress
- January 19 – Lily Donoghue, American actress
- January 22 – Joe Serafini, American actor
- January 23 – Rachel Crow, American actress/singer and comedian
- January 24 – Michael Provost, American actor
- January 26 – Moonbin, South Korean singer and actor (d. 2023)
- January 27 – Devin Druid, American actor
- January 28 – Ariel Winter, American actress
- February 2 – Nina Bloomgarden, American actress
- February 6
  - Jay Lycurgo, British actor
  - Aviva Mongillo, Canadian actress and singer
- February 9 – Isabella Gomez, American actress
- February 10 – Ayesha Madon, Australian actress
- February 11
  - Olivia Scott Welch, American actress
  - Lauren Tsai, American actress, visual artist, and model
- February 13 – Bella Campos, Brazilian actress
- February 15 – Zachary Gordon, American actor
- February 16 – Lizze Broadway, American actress
- February 17
  - Fernanda Urdapilleta, Mexican actress
  - Kayla Cromer, American actress
  - Ania Magliano, English actress and comedian
- February 21 – Ella-Rae Smith, English actress and model
- February 22 – Sophie Wilde, Australian actress
- February 26 – Keyla Monterroso Mejia, American actress and comedian
- February 28 - Belmont Cameli, American actor
- March 3 – Jayson Tatum, American Basketball Player
- March 5 – Micah Fowler, American actor
- March 6 – Odessa Young, Australian actress
- March 11
  - Valentina Herszage, Brazilian actress
  - Emil Wakim, Lebanese-American actor and comedian
- March 13 – Jack Harlow, American rapper, singer, and actor
- March 15 – Juan Paiva, Brazilian actor
- March 18
  - Abigail Cowen, American actress
  - Keana Lyn Bastidas, Canadian actress
- March 19 – Caylee Cowan, American actress
- March 22 – Paola Andino, Puerto Rican-American actress
- March 24 – Christopher Briney, American actor
- March 25
  - Ryan Simpkins, American actor
  - Rhianne Barreto, British actress
  - Jessica Reynolds, Irish actress
- March 26 – Emily Tosta, Dominican actress
- March 29 – Alex Neustaedter, American actor
- April 3 – Paris Jackson, American model, actress, and musician
- April 6
  - Peyton List, American actress
  - Spencer List, American actor
- April 9
  - Elle Fanning, American actress
  - Lil Woods, British actress
- April 10 – Ruby Jerins, American actress
- April 12 – Larry Saperstein, American actor
- April 16 – Jordana Beatty, Australian actress
- April 20 – Felix Mallard, Australian actor
- April 24
  - Ryan Newman, American actress
  - Alli Simpson, Australian actress and singer
  - Stephen Kalyn, Canadian actor
- April 27 – Froy Gutierrez, American actor
- April 29 – Ella Hunt, English actress
- April 30 – Olivia DeJonge, Australian actress
- May 1 – Grayson Russell, American actor
- May 3 – Highdee Kuan, American actress
- May 4
  - Temara Melek, American actress
  - Taylar Hender, American actress
- May 5 – Chelsea Clark, Canadian actress
- May 7 – MrBeast, American YouTuber
- May 8 – Corey Mylchreest, English actor
- May 15 – Anjelika Washington, American actress
- May 20
  - Alanis Guillen, Brazilian actress
  - Zhou Ye, Chinese actress
- May 23 – Ramona Young, American actress
- May 24 – Daisy Edgar-Jones, British actress
- May 29 – Shealeigh, American singer
- June 13 – Zayne Emory, American actor
- June 10 – Ana Yi Puig, American actress
- June 11 – Charlie Tahan, American actor
- June 14 – Brianne Tju, American actress
- June 15 – Rachel Covey, American actress
- June 16 – Lauren Taylor, American actress
- June 19
  - Suzu Hirose, Japanese actress
  - Atticus Shaffer, American actor
- June 24
  - Coy Stewart, American actor and rapper
  - Matt Friend, American actor and comedian
- June 27 – Sistine Stallone, American actress and model
- July 1 – Chloe Bailey, American singer and actress
- July 2 – True Whitaker, American actress
- July 3 – Sara Waisglass, Canadian actress
- July 7 – Dylan Sprayberry, American actor
- July 8
  - Maya Hawke, American actress
  - Jaden Smith, American actor
- July 9 – Robert Capron, American actor
- July 10
  - Angus Cloud, American actor (d. 2023)
  - Haley Pullos, American actress
- July 13 – Cynthy Wu, American actress
- July 15 – Tyriq Withers, American actor
- July 17 – Lilli Schweiger, German actress
- July 22 – Madison Pettis, American actress
- July 23 – Helena Howard, American actress
- July 24
  - Bindi Irwin, Australian actress
  - Cailee Spaeny, American actress
- July 27 – Myles Erlick, Canadian actor and singer
- July 28 – Sasha Meneghel, Brazilian actress
- July 29 – Jessica Lord, English actress
- July 31 – Rico Rodriguez, American actor
- August 1 – Khamani Griffin, American actor
- August 3
  - Cozi Zuehlsdorff, American actress and singer
  - Jack Martin, American actor and comedian
- August 5 – Mimi Keene, English actress
- August 6 – Forrest Goodluck, American actor
- August 12 – Rudy Pankow, American actor
- August 15 - Gulliver McGrath, Australian actor
- August 18 – Mallori Johnson, American actress
- August 21 – Jade Chynoweth, American actress
- August 25 – China Anne McClain, American actress and singer
- August 28 - Mia Healey, Australian actress
- September 1
  - Fin Argus, American actor and musician
  - Fern Deacon, English actress
- September 2 – Choi Ye-bin, South Korean actress
- September 4 – Ainsley Seiger, American actress
- September 5 – Helena Barlow, English actress
- September 8
  - Emma Laird, British actress
  - Sierra Capri, American actress
- September 9 – Amita Rao, American actress and comedian
- September 13 – Nell Williams, English actress
- September 16
  - Belissa Escobedo, American actress
  - Emily Fairn, English actress
- September 17 – Miles Gutierrez-Riley, American actor
- September 19 – Phia Saban, English actress
- September 22 – Isis Hainsworth, English actress
- October 1
  - Isabella Amara, American actress and singer
  - Danika Yarosh, American actress
- October 2 – Zack Morris, English actor
- October 6 – Matt Cornett, American actor
- October 7 – Josh Levi, American actor and singer
- October 10 – Cameron Gellman, American actor
- October 11 – Ruby Ashbourne Serkis, English actress
- October 14 – Ariela Barer, American actress
- October 17 – Erin Kellyman, English actress
- October 18 – Emily Robinson, American actress
- October 19
  - Katie Douglas, Canadian actress
  - Sidney Flanigan, American actress
  - Tanner Zagarino, American actor
- October 23
  - Amandla Stenberg, American actress
- October 26 – Samantha Isler, American actress
- October 28 – Nolan Gould, American actor
- November 2 – Josh Wiggins, American actor
- November 4
  - Meadow Walker, American actress
  - Darcy Rose Byrnes, American and Irish actress
- November 7 – Octavio Ocaña, Mexican actor (died 2021)
- November 10 - Abigail Barlow, American actress and singer-songwriter
- November 13
  - Gattlin Griffith, American actor
  - Jaquel Spivey, American actor
- November 17 – Kara Hayward, American actress
- November 19 - Niamh Blackshaw, English actress
- November 23 – Bradley Steven Perry, American actor
- November 24 – Peyton Meyer, American actor
- November 29 – Lovie Simone, American actress
- December 2
  - Amber Montana, American actress
  - Celeste O'Connor, Kenyan-born American actor
  - Annalise Basso, American actress
- December 8
  - Owen Teague, American actor
  - Tanner Buchanan, American actor
- December 15 – Chandler Canterbury, American former child actor
- December 16
  - Kiara Muhammad, American actress
  - Clara Moneke, Brazilian actress
- December 17
  - Jasmine Armfield, English actress
  - Tyler Young, American actor
- December 23 – G Hannelius, American actress and singer
- December 27 – Briar Nolet, Canadian actress
- December 28 – Jared Gilman, American actor
- December 29
  - Paris Berelc, American actress
  - Seamus Davey-Fitzpatrick, American actor
- December 30 - Michael Bradway, American actor
- December 31 – Hunter Schafer, American actress

== Deaths ==
Month	Date	Name	Age	Country	Profession	Notable films
January	2	Max Colpet	92	US	Screenwriter	Mauvaise Graine; Germany, Year Zero
January	4	Mae Questel	89	US	Actress	Who Framed Roger Rabbit; National Lampoon's Christmas Vacation
January	5	Sonny Bono	62	US	Singer, Actor	Good Times; Hairspray
January	6	Walt Barnes	79	US	Actor	The Big Gundown; Escape to Witch Mountain
January	6	Murray Salem	47	US	Actor, Screenwriter	Kindergarten Cop; The Spy Who Loved Me
January	7	Jacqueline deWit	85	US	Actress	All That Heaven Allows; Little Giant
January	7	Dorothy Wilson	88	US	Actress	One in a Million; Scarlet River
January	16	Lorenzo Mongiardino	81	Italy	Production Designer	Romeo and Juliet; The Taming of the Shrew
January	21	Yoshifumi Kondō	47	Japan	Animator, Director	Kiki's Delivery Service; Whisper of the Heart
January	24	Jack Lord	77	US	Actor	Dr. No; God's Little Acre
January	26	Ethelreda Leopold	83	US	Actress	In the Sweet Pie and Pie; G.I. Wanna Home
January	28	Jim Bohan	52	US	Actor	American Graffiti; Punishment Park
January	30	Ferdy Mayne	81	Germany	Actor	Barry Lyndon; Conan the Destroyer
February	1	Jack T. Collis	75	US	Art Director, Production Designer	Magnum Force; The Last Tycoon
February	2	Duilio Del Prete	59	Italy	Actor	At Long Last Love; Alfredo, Alfredo
February	3	Davy Kaye	81	UK	Actor	Chitty Chitty Bang Bang; Those Magnificent Men in their Flying Machines
February	5	Douglas Gamley	73	Australia	Composer, Conductor	Tron; Enigma
February	15	George White	86	US	Film Editor	Green Dolphin Street; The Postman Always Rings Twice
February	17	Felix Nelson	84	US	Actor	The Learning Tree; The Ballad of Cable Hogue
February	17	Sheila Raynor	91	UK	Actor	A Clockwork Orange; The Omen
February	18	James Villiers	67	UK	Actor	For Your Eyes Only; Repulsion
February	21	John Nicolella	52	US	Director, Producer	Kull the Conqueror; Easy Money
February	23	Chuck Hayward	89	US	Actor, Stuntman	The Blues Brothers; The Longest Yard
February	24	Henny Youngman	91	UK	Comedian, Actor	History of the World, Part I; Goodfellas
February	26	James Algar	75	US	Director, Producer, Animator	Fantasia; The African Lion
February	27	J. T. Walsh	54	US	Actor	Good Morning, Vietnam; A Few Good Men
March	4	Betty Bird	96	Italy	Actress	The Escape to Nice; Waterloo
March	5	Donald Woods	91	Canada	Actor	Anthony Adverse; The Case of the Stuttering Bishop
March	10	Lloyd Bridges	85	US	Actor	High Noon; Airplane!
March	17	Helen Westcott	70	US	Actress	The Gunfighter; God's Little Acre
March	20	Beverley Cross	66	UK	Screenwriter	Clash of the Titans; Jason and the Argonauts
March	25	Daniel Massey	64	UK	Actor	Star!; In Which We Serve
March	30	Ramsay Ames	79	US	Actress	The Mummy's Ghost; The Gay Cavalier
April	1	Gene Evans	75	US	Actor	The Steel Helmet; Shock Corridor
April	1	Lucille Norman	76	US	Singer, Actress	Carson City; Painting the Clouds with Sunshine
April	3	Charles Lang	96	US	Cinematographer	Some Like It Hot; The Magnificent Seven
April	4	Kay Hughes	84	US	Actress	The Big Show; Dick Tracy
April	11	Rodney Harvey	30	US	Actor	My Own Private Idaho; Guncrazy
April	21	Peter Lind Hayes	82	US	Actor	The 5,000 Fingers of Dr. T.; The Senator Was Indiscreet
April	22	Marvin Worth	72	US	Producer	Malcolm X; The Rose
April	24	Leslie Stevens	74	US	Screenwriter, Director	The Marriage-Go-Round; Incubus
April	28	Jerome Bixby	75	US	Screenwriter	It! The Terror from Beyond Space; Fantastic Voyage
April	28	Dorothy Lovett	83	US	Actress	Meet Dr. Christian; The Mantrap
April	29	Mary Castle	67	US	Actress	Gunsmoke; The Jailbreakers
May	2	Maidie Norman	85	US	Actress	What Ever Happened to Baby Jane?; Halloween III: Season of the Witch
May	3	Gene Raymond	89	US	Actor	Flying Down to Rio; Mr. & Mrs. Smith
May	9	Alice Faye	83	US	Actress, Singer	In Old Chicago; Alexander's Ragtime Band
May	9	Nat Perrin	93	US	Screenwriter, Director	The Great Morgan; Hellzapoppin'
May	11	Gene Fowler Jr.	80	US	Film Editor	It's a Mad, Mad, Mad, Mad World; Hang 'Em High
May	14	Frank Sinatra	82	US	Singer, Actor	From Here to Eternity; The Manchurian Candidate
May	15	Linwood G. Dunn	93	US	Visual Effects Artist	West Side Story; 2001: A Space Odyssey
May	20	Wolf Mankowitz	73	UK	Screenwriter	Casino Royale; A Kid for Two Farthings
May	21	Douglas Fowley	86	US	Actor	Singin' in the Rain; Mighty Joe Young
May	22	John Derek	71	US	Actor, Director	Knock on Any Door; Saturday's Hero
May	28	Phil Hartman	49	US	Actor, Comedian, Screenwriter	Pee-wee's Big Adventure; Jingle All the Way
June	1	Darwin Joston	60	US	Actor	Assault on Precinct 13; Eraserhead
June	2	Dorothy Stickney	101	US	Actress	The Catered Affair; I Never Sang for My Father
June	4	Josephine Hutchinson	94	US	Actress	North by Northwest; The Story of Louis Pasteur
June	5	Jeanette Nolan	85	US	Actress	The Man Who Shot Liberty Valance; The Big Heat
June	12	Theresa Merritt	73	US	Actress	Billy Madison; The Wiz
June	18	Charles Korvin	90	Slovakia	Actor	Berlin Express; Ship of Fools
June	23	Kurt Kren	69	Austria	Director	8/64: Ana – Aktion Brus; 10/65: Selbstverstümmelung
June	23	Maureen O'Sullivan	87	Ireland	Actress	Tarzan the Ape Man; The Thin Man
June	24	Henry G. Saperstein	80	US	Producer	What's Up, Tiger Lily?; Mr. Magoo
July	1	Claire Kelly	64	US	Actress	The Badlanders; Party Girl
July	4	Gregg Burge	40	US	Actor	A Chorus Line; School Daze
July	6	Roy Rogers	86	US	Actor, Singer	Son of Paleface; King of the Cowboys
July	10	William Preston	76	US	Actor	The Fisher King; Waterworld
July	16	Leigh Brown	59	US	Screenwriter	A Christmas Story; It Runs in the Family
July	17	Joseph Maher	64	Ireland	Actor	Mars Attacks!; In & Out
July	19	Betty Marsden	79	UK	Actress	Night and the City; The Dresser
July	21	Robert Young	91	US	Actor	Crossfire; That Forsyte Woman
July	27	Binnie Barnes	95	UK	Actress	The Private Life of Henry VIII; The Spanish Main
July	28	Lenny McLean	49	UK	Actor	Lock, Stock and Two Smoking Barrels; The Fifth Element
July	29	Jerome Robbins	79	US	Director, Choreographer	West Side Story
July	29	O. Z. Whitehead	87	US	Actor	The Lion in Winter; The Grapes of Wrath
August	1	Eva Bartok	71	Hungary	Actress	The Crimson Pirate; Ten Thousand Bedrooms
August	7	Bob Wyman	66	US	Film Editor	Greased Lightning; Logan's Run
August	11	Derek Newark	65	UK	Actor	City Under the Sea; Dad's Army
August	15	Marc Akerstream	44	Canada	Stuntman, Actor	Needful Things; Rumble in the Bronx
August	16	Phil Leeds	82	US	Actor	Ghost; Rosemary's Baby
August	18	Persis Khambatta	49	India	Actress	Star Trek: The Motion Picture; Nighthawks
August	24	E. G. Marshall	84	US	Actor	12 Angry Men; The Caine Mutiny
August	24	Gene Page	58	US	Composer	Blacula; Brewster McCloud
August	26	Wade Dominguez	32	US	Actor	Dangerous Minds; City of Industry
August	26	Penny Edwards	70	US	Actress	Street Bandits; Missing Women
September	2	Fernando Carrere	87	Mexico	Art Director	The Great Escape; The Pink Panther
September	6	Akira Kurosawa	88	Japan	Director, Screenwriter	Seven Samurai; Rashomon
September	6	Elaine Shepard	85	US	Actress	Seven Days Ashore; You Can't Fool Your Wife
September	8	Leonid Kinskey	95	Russia	Actor	Casablanca; Duck Soup
September	11	Dane Clark	86	US	Actor	Whiplash; Destination Tokyo
September	19	Patricia Hayes	88	UK	Actress	A Fish Called Wanda; Willow
September	21	Clara Calamai	89	Italy	Actress	Deep Red; Ossessione
September	22	John Garrie	75	UK	Actor	if....; The Private Life of Sherlock Holmes
September	30	Marius Goring	86	UK	Actor	Ill Met by Moonlight; The Moonraker
September	30	Stephen Pearlman	63	US	Actor	Pi; Die Hard with a Vengeance
October	2	Gene Autry	91	US	Actor, Singer	The Singing Cowboy; The Phantom Empire
October	3	George Davis	84	US	Art Director	The Robe; All About Eve
October	3	Roddy McDowall	70	UK	Actor	Planet of the Apes; The Poseidon Adventure
October	8	Gigi Reder	70	Italy	Actor	Fantozzi; Who Is Afraid Of Dracula?
October	11	Richard Denning	84	US	Actor	An Affair to Remember; Creature from the Black Lagoon
October	17	Joan Hickson	92	UK	Actress	Clockwise; Theatre of Blood
October	22	Eric Ambler	89	UK	Screenwriter	A Night to Remember; Topkapi
October	23	Christopher Gable	58	UK	Actor	The Boy Friend; The Lair of the White Worm
October	24	Dennis Ayling	81	UK	Visual Effects Artist	Alien
October	26	Rick Dior	51	US	Sound Engineer	Apollo 13; Juice
October	27	Rosamund John	85	UK	Actress	When the Bough Breaks; Green for Danger
October	28	James Goldman	71	US	Screenwriter	The Lion in Winter; They Might Be Giants
November	2	Tommy Duggan	89	UK	Actor	The Omen; Superman II
November	3	Martha O'Driscoll	76	US	Actress	House of Dracula; Wagon Train
November	4	Vincent Winter	50	UK	Actor, Production Manager	The Kidnappers; Superman
November	5	Momoko Kōchi	66	Japan	Actress	Godzilla; The Mysterians
November	8	Jean Marais	84	France	Actor, Director	Julietta; White Nights
November	9	Ursula Reit	84	Germany	Actress	Willy Wonka & the Chocolate Factory; Three Men in the Snow
November	13	Valerie Hobson	81	UK	Actress	Kind Hearts and Coronets; Great Expectations
November	17	Dick O'Neill	70	US	Actor	The Taking of Pelham One Two Three; The Jerk
November	17	Esther Rolle	78	US	Actress	Driving Miss Daisy; Rosewood
November	19	Alan J. Pakula	70	US	Director, Producer, Screenwriter	All the President's Men; Sophie's Choice
November	22	Nicky Blair	72	US	Actor	The Godfather Part III; Rocky V
November	25	Enrico Sabbatini	66	Italy	Costume Designer	Seven Years in Tibet; The Mission
November	25	Flip Wilson	64	US	Comedian, Actor	Skatetown, USA; The Fish That Saved Pittsburgh
November	30	Ruth Clifford	98	US	Actress	The Dramatic Life of Abraham Lincoln; The Amazing Woman
December	1	Freddie Young	96	UK	Cinematographer	Lawrence of Arabia; Doctor Zhivago
December	7	John Addison	78	UK	Composer	A Bridge Too Far; Tom Jones
December	8	John Veitch	78	US	Producer, Executive	Bram Stoker's Dracula; Fly Away Home
December	13	Lew Grade	91	UK	Producer	The Dark Crystal; Sophie's Choice
December	13	Ariadna Welter	68	Mexico	Actress	The Devil's Hand; The Boxer
December	14	Norman Fell	74	US	Actor	Bullitt; Charley Varrick
December	17	John Robert Lloyd	78	US	Production Designer	Midnight Cowboy; Clue
December	20	Irene Hervey	89	US	Actress	Play Misty for Me; Cactus Flower
December	21	Roger Avon	84	UK	Actor	Daleks – Invasion Earth: 2150 A.D.; Curse of the Crimson Altar
December	23	David Manners	98	Canada	Actor	Dracula; The Mummy
December	25	Richard Paul	58	US	Actor	The People vs. Larry Flynt; Eating Raoul
December	26	Hurd Hatfield	81	US	Actor	The Picture of Dorian Gray; The Boston Strangler
December	28	William Frankfather	54	US	Actor	Death Becomes Her; Foul Play
December	29	Don Taylor	81	US	Actor, Director	Stalag 17; Father of the Bride

== Film debuts ==
- Juana Acosta – Time Out
- Carlos Alazraqui – The Godson
- Elizabeth Banks – Surrender Dorothy
- Kristen Bell – Polish Wedding
- Wes Bentley – Three Below Zero
- Kate Bosworth – The Horse Whisperer
- Billy Boyd – Urban Ghost Story
- A. J. Buckley – Disturbing Behavior
- Christian Campbell – Hairshirt
- Joelle Carter – The Horse Whisperer
- Lacey Chabert – Lost in Space
- Kevin Chapman – Monument Ave.
- Paz de la Huerta – The Object of My Affection
- August Diehl – 23
- Taye Diggs – How Stella Got Her Groove Back
- Snoop Dogg – Half Baked
- Lola Dueñas – Mensaka
- Hilary Duff – Casper Meets Wendy
- Cedric the Entertainer – Ride
- Golshifteh Farahani – The Pear Tree
- Vera Farmiga – Return to Paradise
- Josh Hartnett – Halloween H20: 20 Years Later
- Taraji P. Henson – Streetwise
- Kate Hudson – Desert Blue
- Oscar Isaac – Illtown
- Rashida Jones – Myth America
- Vinnie Jones – Lock, Stock and Two Smoking Barrels
- Shia LaBeouf – The Christmas Path
- Lindsay Lohan – The Parent Trap
- Mía Maestro – Tango
- Eva Mendes – A Night at the Roxbury
- Chris Messina – Rounders
- Cillian Murphy – The Tale of Sweety Barrett
- Julianne Nicholson – Harvest
- Christopher Nolan (director) – Following
- Michael Pitt – 54
- Jesse Plemons – Finding North
- Amy Poehler – Tomorrow Night
- Rebecca Romijn – Dirty Work
- Jason Schwartzman – Rushmore
- Jason Segel – Can't Hardly Wait
- Dax Shepard – Hairshirt
- Jason Statham – Lock, Stock and Two Smoking Barrels
- Ray Stevenson – The Theory of Flight
- Michael Stuhlbarg – A Price Above Rubies
- Wanda Sykes – Tomorrow Night
- Luis Tosar – Atilano for President
- Carice van Houten – Ivory Guardians
- Denis Villeneuve (director) – August 32nd on Earth
- Matt Walsh – Tomorrow Night
- Mark Webber – Edge City
- Michael Welch – Star Trek: Insurrection
- Shea Whigham – Of Love & Fantasy
- Daniel Wu - Bishonen
