= Hiroshi Yanaka =

Japanese voice actor (born 1958)

- 家中 宏
- Born: March 10, 1958 (age 68); Tokyo, Japan
- Occupation: voice actor
- Agent: Aptepro

Hiroshi Yanaka (家中 宏, Yanaka Hiroshi; born March 10, 1958) is a Japanese voice actor.

Born in Tokyo, he is affiliated with Aptepro. His wife is a fellow voice actress Miho Yoshida (吉田 美保, Yoshida Miho).

== Filmography ==
=== Anime ===
| Year | Series | Role | Notes | Source |
|---|---|---|---|---|
| 1997 | Eat-Man | Mark Mitchell | Ep. 1 | |
| 1997 | Rurouni Kenshin: The Motion Picture | Tsunan Tsukioka | | |
| 1998–99 | Master Keaton | Usami | | |
| 1999 | Karakurizōshi Ayatsuri Sakon | Jun Eda | | |
| 2000 | Gensomaden Saiyuki | Shien | | |
| 2000 | Sakura Wars | Matani Aoi | | |
| 2000 | Inuyasha | Naraku/Onigumo | before Toshiyuki Morikawa | |
| 2000 | Ah! My Goddess: The Movie | Celestine | | |
| 2001 | Noir | Cressoy | | |
| 2001 | Mazinkaiser | Tetsuya Tsurugi | OAV | |
| 2002 | .hack//Sign | Sora | | |
| 2002 | Wild 7 | Kuromatsu | | |
| 2002–07 | Naruto | Shikaku Nara | | |
| 2004 | Mars Daybreak | Poipoider | | |
| 2006 | Fist of the Blue Sky | Emperor Manchuko | | |
| 2007–11 | Kaiji | Kōji Ishida | | |
| 2008–11 | Stitch! | Dr. Jacques von Hämsterviel | | |
| 2010 | Junod | Junod | feature film | |
| 2012 | The Mystical Laws | General | feature film | |
| 2013 | Tamako Market | Nobuhiko Tokiwa | | |
| 2013–14 | Free! - Iwatobi Swim Club | Goro Sasabe | | |
| 2014 | Terra Formars | Ko Honda | | |
| 2015 | Shōwa Genroku Rakugo Shinjū | Seventh Generation Yakumo Yūrakutei | | |
| 2016 | Re:Zero − Starting Life in Another World | Ketty Muttat | Ep. 14, 23-24 | |
| 2016 | Regalia: The Three Sacred Stars | Jonathan Marshall | Ep. 2-9 | |
| 2016 | Nanbaka | Okina Otogi | | |
| 2017 | Mahojin Guru Guru | Minister | Ep. 11-12 | |
| 2019 | Isekai Cheat Magician | Gilmar | | |
| 2020 | BNA: Brand New Animal | Jem Horner | | |
| 2021 | Mars Red | Sonosuke Nakajima | | |
| 2021 | The Aquatope on White Sand | Kukuru's Grandfather | | |
| 2021 | Miss Kobayashi's Dragon Maid S | Shouta's Father | Ep. 9 | |
| 2021 | Super Crooks | Christopher Matts | ONA | |
| 2022 | Legend of Mana: The Teardrop Crystal | Nouvelle | | |
| 2023 | Vinland Saga Season 2 | Pater | | |
| 2023 | Hokkyoku Hyakkaten no Concierge-san | Sea Mink (Father) | feature film | |
| 2023 | The Apothecary Diaries | Luomen | | |
| 2023 | Pluto | Professor Hoffman | ONA | |
| 2024 | Metallic Rouge | Puppeteer | | |
| 2024 | I'll Become a Villainess Who Goes Down in History | Will | | |
| 2026 | Liar Game | Nao's Father | Eps. 1–2 | |
| 2026 | Witch Hat Atelier | Kukrow | | |
| 2026 | The Ghost in the Shell | Vice-Minister Ito | Ep. 1 | |

=== Tokusatsu ===
| Year | Series | Role | Notes | Source |
|---|---|---|---|---|
| 2004 | Kamen Rider 555 | Arch Orphnoch | Ep. 47, 49-50 | |
| 2008 | Kamen Rider Den-O | Death Imagin | Ep. 48-49 | |
| 2011 | Tensou Sentai Goseiger | Ro-O-Za-Ri of the Hydrapan Headder | Ep. 47-48 | |

=== Overseas dubs ===
| Series | Role | Notes | Source |
|---|---|---|---|
John Cusack
| City Hall | Kevin Calhoun | | |
| Con Air | Vince Larkin | | |
| Grosse Pointe Blank | Martin Q. Blank | | |
| Midnight in the Garden of Good and Evil | John Kelso | | |
| The Thin Red Line | Capt. John Gaff | | |
| Pushing Tin | Nick "The Zone" Falzone | | |
| America's Sweethearts | Eddie Thomas | | |
| Serendipity | Jonathan Trager | | |
| Max | Max Rothman | | |
| Runaway Jury | Nicholas Easter | | |
| The Contract | Ray Keene | | |
| 2012 | Jackson Curtis | | |
| Shanghai | Paul Soames | | |
| The Paperboy | Hillary Van Wetter | | |
| The Frozen Ground | Robert Hansen | | |
| Grand Piano | Clem | | |
| The Numbers Station | Emerson Kent | | |
| The Bag Man | Jack | | |
| Drive Hard | Simon Keller | | |
| The Prince | Sam | | |
| Reclaim | Benjamin | | |
| Dragon Blade | Lucius | | |
| Cell | Clayton "Clay" Riddell | | |
| Arsenal | Sal | | |
| Blood Money | Miller | | |
| Singularity | Elias VanDorne | | |
Sam Rockwell
| Charlie's Angels | Eric Knox | | |
| Conviction | Kenny Waters | | |
| Cowboys & Aliens | Doc | | |
| A Single Shot | John Moon | | |
| The Way, Way Back | Owen | | |
| Vice | George W. Bush | | |
| Richard Jewell | Watson Bryant | | |
John Leguizamo
| To Wong Foo, Thanks for Everything! Julie Newmar | Chi-Chi Rodriguez | | |
| Executive Decision | Captain Carlos "Rat" Lopez | | |
| Romeo + Juliet | Tybalt | | |
| Moulin Rouge! | Henri de Toulouse-Lautrec | | |
| John Wick | Aurelio | | |
| John Wick: Chapter 2 | Aurelio | | |
Robert Carlyle
| The Full Monty | Gary "Gaz" Schofield | | |
| Angela's Ashes | Malachy McCourt | | |
| Ravenous | Colonel Ives / F.W. Colqhoun | | |
| Eragon | Durza | | |
| 28 Weeks Later | Don | | |
| Once Upon a Time | Rumpelstiltskin / Mr. Gold | | |
Edward Norton
| American History X | Derek Vinyard | | |
| The Score | Jack Teller | | |
| Kingdom of Heaven | King Baldwin | | |
| Leaves of Grass | Bill and Brady Kincaid | | |
| Moonrise Kingdom | Scout Master Ward | | |
Others
| 12 Rounds 2: Reloaded | Patrick Heller | Voice dub for Brian Markinson | |
| 15 Minutes | Jordan Warsaw | Voice dub for Edward Burns | |
| 21 Grams | Paul Rivers | Voice dub for Sean Penn | |
| The Amazing Spider-Man 2 | Donald Menken | Voice dub for Colm Feore | |
| As Good as It Gets | Simon Bishop | Voice dub for Greg Kinnear | |
| Ballistic: Ecks vs. Sever | A.J. Ross | Voice dub for Ray Park | |
| Band of Brothers | Capt. Ronald Speirs | Voice dub for Matthew Settle | |
| The Bank Job | Kevin Swain | Voice dub for Stephen Campbell Moore | |
| Bean | David Langley | Voice dub for Peter MacNicol | |
| Before Night Falls | Pepe Malas | Voice dub for Andrea Di Stefano | |
| Big Daddy | Kevin Gerrity | Voice dub for Jon Stewart | |
| The Birth of a Nation | Samuel Turner | Voice dub for Armie Hammer | |
| Blitz | Porter Nash | Voice dub for Paddy Considine | |
| Blood Diamond | Rupert Simmons | Voice dub for Michael Sheen | |
| The Body Collector | Hans Knoop | Voice dub for Guy Clemens | |
| The Brothers McMullen | Barry McMullen | Voice dub for Edward Burns | |
| The Cell 2 | Duncan | Voice dub for Frank Whaley | |
| Charlie and the Chocolate Factory | Mr. Bucket | Voice dub for Noah Taylor; 2008 NTV edition | |
| Cinderella Man | Mike Wilson | Voice dub for Paddy Considine | |
| Collateral Damage | Claudio Perrini | Voice dub for Cliff Curtis | |
| Congo | Richard | Voice dub for Grant Heslov | |
| CSI: Crime Scene Investigation | Nick Stokes | Voice dub for George Eads | |
| Daddy Day Care | Marvin | Voice dub for Steve Zahn | |
| Desperate Housewives | Mike Delfino | Voice dub for James Denton | |
| Dirty | Lieutenant | Voice dub for Cole Hauser | |
| The Dukes of Hazzard | Luke Duke | Voice dub for Johnny Knoxville | |
| Emily Brontë's Wuthering Heights | Hindley Earnshaw | Voice dub for Jeremy Northam | |
| Face/Off | Pollux Trot | Voice dub for Alessandro Nivola | |
| Feast of Love | Bradley Smith | Voice dub for Greg Kinnear | |
| Firestorm | Paco | Voice dub for Ray Lui | |
| Flyboys | Reed Cassidy | Voice dub for Martin Henderson | |
| Ghost | Carl Bruner | Voice dub for Tony Goldwyn; 1999 TV Asahi edition | |
| The Great Gatsby | Tom Buchanan | Voice dub for Bruce Dern | |
| The Green Hornet | Popeye | Voice dub for Jamie Harris | |
| Harry Potter and the Deathly Hallows – Part 1 | Pius Thicknesse | Voice dub for Guy Henry | |
| Harry Potter and the Deathly Hallows – Part 2 | Pius Thicknesse | Voice dub for Guy Henry | |
| Hellboy II: The Golden Army | Prince Nuada Silverlance | Voice dub for Luke Goss | |
| iBoy | Ellman | Voice dub for Rory Kinnear | |
| Interview with the Vampire | Daniel Molloy | Voice dub for Christian Slater | |
| Kate & Leopold | His Grace Leopold Alexis Elijah Walker Gareth Thomas Mountbatten | Voice dub for Hugh Jackman | |
| The League of Extraordinary Gentlemen | Dorian Gray | Voice dub for Stuart Townsend | |
| Legends of the Fall | Alfred Ludlow | Voice dub for Aidan Quinn | |
| Lonely Hearts | Raymond Martinez Fernandez | Voice dub for Jared Leto | |
| Love, Honour and Obey | Matthew | Voice dub for Rhys Ifans | |
| A Man Called Hero | Hero Hua | Voice dub for Ekin Cheng | |
| Maximum Risk | Sebastien | Voice dub for Jean-Hugues Anglade | |
| Murder on the Orient Express | Gerhard Hardman | Voice dub for Willem Dafoe | |
| The Negotiator | Lieutenant Chris Sabian | Voice dub for Kevin Spacey | |
| Nurse Betty | George McCord | Voice dub for Greg Kinnear | |
| Our Brand Is Crisis | Pat Candy | Voice dub for Billy Bob Thornton | |
| Out for Justice | Richie Madano | Voice dub for William Forsythe | |
| The Padre | The Padre | Voice dub for Tim Roth | |
| Paparazzi | Bo Laramie | Voice dub for Cole Hauser | |
| The Paper Tigers | Danny | Voice dub for Alain Uy | |
| The Perfect Storm | Robert "Bobby" Shatford | Voice dub for Mark Wahlberg | |
| Quantum of Solace | Dominic Greene | Voice dub for Mathieu Amalric | |
| Rebound | Tim Fink | Voice dub for Breckin Meyer | |
| The Ring | Noah Clay | Voice dub for Martin Henderson | |
| Risen | Yeshua | Voice dub for Cliff Curtis | |
| Road to Perdition | Harlen Maguire | Voice dub for Jude Law | |
| Rumble in the Bronx | Angelo | Voice dub for Garvin Cross | |
| Saving Private Ryan | Irwin Wade | Voice dub for Giovanni Ribisi | |
| The Seeker: The Dark Is Rising | The Rider | Voice dub for Christopher Eccleston | |
| Showgirls | Zack Carey | Voice dub for Kyle MacLachlan | |
| The Silence of the Lambs | Buffalo Bill | Voice dub for Ted Levine | |
| Solaris | Snow | Voice dub for Jeremy Davies | |
| Starship Troopers | Colonel Carl Jenkins | Voice dub for Neil Patrick Harris | |
| Suburra | Cardinal Berchet | Voice dub for Jean-Hugues Anglade | |
| There's Something About Mary | Tucker / Norm Phipps | Voice dub for Lee Evans | |
| Train to Busan | Ki-chul | Voice dub for Jang Hyuk-jin | |
| True Romance | Clarence Worley | Voice dub for Christian Slater | |
| Unforgiven | The Schofield Kid | Voice dub for Jaimz Woolvett | |
| Unthinkable | Yusuf Atta Mohammed / Steven Arthur Younger | Voice dub for Michael Sheen | |
| Young and Dangerous | Chan Ho-nam | Voice dub for Ekin Cheng | |
Animation
| Atlantis: The Lost Empire | Mole | | |
| Atlantis: Milo's Return | Mole | | |
| Wreck-It Ralph | Wynnchel | | |
