= Larking =

Larking is a surname. Notable people with the surname include:

- Gunhild Larking (born 1936), Swedish high jumper
- John Larking (1921–1998), English cricketer
- Lambert Blackwell Larking (1797–1868), English clergyman, writer and antiquarian
- Ron Larking (1890–1918), Australian rules footballer
