= Weightlifting at the 1948 Summer Olympics – Men's 82.5 kg =

Men's 82.5 kg at the Games of the XIV Olympiad
- Venue: Empress Hall (Earls Court Exhibition Centre)
- Date: 11 August 1948
- Competitors: 16 from 13 nations
- Winning total: 417.5 kg OR

Medalists
1st place, gold medalist(s)		Stanley Stanczyk	United States
2nd place, silver medalist(s)		Harold Sakata	United States
3rd place, bronze medalist(s)		Gösta Magnusson	Sweden

The men's 82.5 kg weightlifting competitions at the 1948 Summer Olympics in London took place on 11 August at the Empress Hall of the Earls Court Exhibition Centre. It was the sixth time the light-heavyweight class competition was held, all at 82.5 kg.

Each weightlifter had three attempts at each of the three lifts. The best score for each lift was summed to give a total. The weightlifter could increase the weight between attempts (minimum of 5 kg between first and second attempts, 2.5 kg between second and third attempts) but could not decrease weight. If two or more weightlifters finished with the same total, the competitors' body weights were used as the tie-breaker (lighter athlete wins).

== Records ==
Prior to this competition, the existing world and Olympic records were as follows.

World record	Press	Grigory Novak (URS)	141.5 kg		1947
World record	Snatch	Grigory Novak (URS)	131.5 kg		1947
World record	Clean & Jerk	Henri Ferrari (FRA)	169 kg		1945
World record	Total	Grigory Novak (URS)	425 kg	Paris, France	18–19 October 1946
Olympic record	Press	Louis Hostin (FRA)	110 kg	Berlin, Germany	3 August 1936
Olympic record	Snatch	Louis Hostin (FRA)	117.5 kg	Berlin, Germany	3 August 1936
Olympic record	Clean & Jerk	Eugen Deutsch (GER)	150 kg	Berlin, Germany	3 August 1936
Olympic record	Clean & Jerk	Ibrahim Wasif (EGY)	150 kg	Berlin, Germany	3 August 1936
Olympic record	Total	Louis Hostin (FRA)	372.5 kg	Berlin, Germany	3 August 1936

== Results ==
Rank	Athlete	Nation	Body weight	Press (kg)				Snatch (kg)				Clean & Jerk (kg)				Total
Rank	Athlete	Nation	Body weight	1	2	3	Result	1	2	3	Result	1	2	3	Result	Total
1st place, gold medalist(s)	Stanley Stanczyk	United States	80.66	122.5	127.5	130	130 OR	122.5	130	~~132.5~~	130 OR	157.5	~~165~~	~~165~~	157.5 OR	417.5 OR
2nd place, silver medalist(s)	Harold Sakata	United States	80.85	105	~~110~~	110	110	112.5	~~117.5~~	117.5	117.5	142.5	150	152.5	152.5	380
3rd place, bronze medalist(s)	Gösta Magnusson	Sweden	82.49	105	110	~~112.5~~	110	115	~~120~~	120	120	145	~~150~~	~~150~~	145	375
4	Jean Debuf	France	82.20	100	105	107.5	107.5	107.5	112.5	~~115~~	112.5	142.5	147.5	150	150	370
5	Osvaldo Forte	Argentina	81.42	100	105	~~107.5~~	105	105	110	115	115	135	142.5	147.5	147.5	367.5
6	Jack Varaleau	Canada	80.84	105	110	112.5	112.5	105	110	112.5	112.5	135	140	~~145~~	140	365
7	Juhani Vellamo	Finland	80.98	95	100	~~102.5~~	100	110	115	~~117.5~~	115	140	~~145~~	~~145~~	140	355
8	Rasoul Raisi	Iran	81.15	102.5	107.5	110	110	100	105	110	110	130	135	~~140~~	135	355
9	Ernie Roe	Great Britain	82.24	105	110	~~115~~	110	105	~~110~~	~~110~~	105	135	~~140~~	140	140	355
10	László Buronyi	Hungary	82.40	95	100	102.5	102.5	105	110	112.5	112.5	135	140	~~142.5~~	140	355
11	Mohamed Ibrahim Saleh	Egypt	82.50	97.5	~~102.5~~	~~102.5~~	97.5	107.5	~~112.5~~	112.5	112.5	140	~~150~~	~~150~~	140	350
11	Raymond Herbaux	France	82.50	97.5	102.5	~~105~~	102.5	100	105	107.5	107.5	132.5	137.5	140	140	350
13	Wilhelm Pankl	Austria	79.92	90	~~95~~	95	95	102.5	~~107.5~~	107.5	107.5	137.5	~~145~~	145	145	347.5
14	Fritz Haller	Austria	82.09	95	~~100~~	100	100	107.5	~~112.5~~	~~112.5~~	107.5	135	~~140~~	~~140~~	135	342.5
15	Alex Bisiak	Peru	80.75	~~97.5~~	97.5	~~102.5~~	97.5	97.5	~~102.5~~	102.5	102.5	127.5	132.5	~~135~~	132.5	332.5
16	Lee Yeong-hwan	South Korea	81.39	100	~~105~~	~~105~~	100	~~105~~	105	~~110~~	105	~~145~~	~~145~~	~~145~~	0	205

== New records ==
Press	130 kg	Stanley Stanczyk (USA)	OR
Snatch	130 kg	Stanley Stanczyk (USA)	OR
Clean & Jerk	157.5 kg	Stanley Stanczyk (USA)	OR
Total	417.5 kg	Stanley Stanczyk (USA)	OR
