= Marmol (disambiguation) =

Marmol is a town and seat of Marmul District in Balkh Province in northern Afghanistan.

Marmol or Mármol may refer to:

People

- Luis del Mármol Carvajal (born 1520), Spanish historical chronicler
- Carlos Mármol (born 1982), Dominican former professional baseball relief pitcher
- Fernando Tarrida del Mármol (1861–1915), Cuban anarchist writer
- José Mármol (1818–1871), Argentine journalist, politician, librarian, and writer of the Romantic school
- Leo Marmol, a partner in the architecture firm Marmol Radziner
- Líder Mármol (born 1985), Paraguayan professional footballer
- Lluis Lopez Marmol (born 1997), Spanish professional footballer
- Manuel Sánchez Mármol (1839–1912), Mexican writer, journalist, lawyer, politician
- Miguel Mármol (1905–1993), Salvadoran communist activist, founder of the Communist Party of El Salvador
- Oliver Marmol (born 1986), manager of the St. Louis Cardinals of Major League Baseball
- Rubén Pérez del Mármol (born 1989), Spanish footballer who plays for CD Leganés on loan from Granada CF as a defensive midfielder

Other

- El coloso de mármol (The Marble Colossus), a 1929 Mexican silent drama film
- Mármol Macael CD, Spanish football team founded in 1952 and based in Macael, Almería, in the autonomous community of Andalusia

== See also ==
- Marmol Radziner, Los Angeles-based design-build practice founded in 1989 by American architects Leo Marmol and Ron Radziner
- José Mármol, Buenos Aires, a city in Argentina
