= Jorge Soto =

Jorge Soto may refer to:

- Jorge Soto (footballer) (born 1971), retired Peruvian footballer
- Jorge Soto (golfer) (1945–2011), Argentine professional golfer
- Jorge Soto (cyclist) (born 1986), Uruguayan road bicycle racer and track cyclist
- Jorge Soto (weightlifter) (1921–1973), Puerto Rican Olympic weightlifter
