= Red Sky at Morning (Bradford novel) =

1968 novel by Richard Bradford

- Author: Richard Bradford
- Language: English
- Publication date: 1968
- Publication place: United States

Red Sky at Morning is a 1968 novel by Richard Bradford. It was made into a 1971 film of the same name. The book follows Josh Arnold, a young man whose family relocates from Mobile, Alabama to Corazon Sagrado, New Mexico during World War II. It was regarded as a "true delight" (Washington Post Book World) and a "novel of consequence" (New York Times Book Review). The title of the novel comes from a line in an ancient mariner's rhyme "Red sky at morning, sailor take warning".

== Characters/plot details ==
- Joshua Arnold – in many ways a typical teenager, Josh possesses an underlying strength that allows him to endure a variety of pressures and difficulties. When his father leaves to join the United States Navy, Josh takes over his role as head of the household. These additional responsibilities turn Josh from the seemingly naïve boy at the beginning of the novel into the capable adult into which he evolves.
- Frank Arnold – Mr. Arnold is Josh's father. Although racism is a common issue at the time, Mr. Arnold often goes out of his way to help minorities, whom he may employ. Mr. Arnold owns a shipyard but insists on joining the Navy. His absence plays a major role in Josh's development.
- Ann Arnold – Mrs. Arnold is Josh's mother and is in sharp contrast to his father. Mrs. Arnold is a strong southern woman who does not display the same kindness to minorities. The absence of her husband, however, leads to her mental breakdown, another trying factor for Josh, halfway through the book.
- Amalie – Amalie was Mr. Arnold's high school friend. She spoke kindly of his treatment of her throughout high school. They dated in high school also but instead of marrying her Mr. Arnold married Ann Arnold. She did and still does love Mr. Arnold and does not hold back in telling Josh so.
- Jimbob Buel – Jimbob is a professional house guest, who has been bouncing between houses for quite some time. He spends several months with the Arnolds.
- Courtney Ann Conway – Courtney Anne, or Corky, is Josh's girlfriend from Mobile.
- Paul and Lacey – Paul and Lacey are the Arnolds' domestic employees in Mobile. Upon being let go, because the family is moving, they receive 500 dollars from Mr. Arnold, while "Mrs. Ann" gives them only 10.
- Amadeo and Excilda Montoya – The Arnolds' domestic help in Sagrado. In a rage, Josh's mother fires them. Later, they are rehired by Josh.
- Victoria – Victoria is the Montoyas' daughter. When he is younger, Josh proclaims that he loves her, however, years later she is not mentioned much because Josh's feelings for her may not be racially acceptable.
- Chango Lopez – Chango was the bully in Sagrado. He constantly picked on Josh and the other kids with his gang of associates. However, after a near fatal stabbing he is transformed into a devout Catholic and a friend of Josh.
- Viola Lopez – Viola is Chango's sister. She was very religious and the pride of her family and town for her studies. However, she is later corrupted by Tarzan Velarde.
- Tarzan Velarde – Tarzan was one of Chango's gang. After going crazy and stabbing Chango, he flees and hides in hills and abandoned buildings. Viola takes pity on him and tries to help him but after stealing liquor and subsequently getting drunk, he rapes Viola. Tarzan is eventually brought to justice by Chamaco.
- Marcia-An outgoing girl that resides in Sagrado. Her open personality and unbashfulness often contrast with Josh's own personality. She quickly becomes one of Josh's good friends and love interest.
- Steenie-The first friend Josh makes in Sagrado. Steenie is a meaty boy with a quick tongue. His father is the only obstetrician in Sagrado, and often runs around delivering babies. Steenie has a wide knowledge of anatomy and uses his knowledge to cleverly convince people to do things for him, or to just be funny.
- 'Chamaco – Chamaco is the town sheriff in Sagrado. His biggest role in the story is his pursuit of Tarzan, which he does with much enthusiasm because it is some of the only police work he gets to do in Sagrado.
- Venery Ann and Velva Mae Cloyd – The Cloyd sisters are the two beautiful shallow sisters in Sagrado. When they become pregnant, their father rushes into the school with a shotgun searching for the boy responsible.
- Mr. Cloyd – Mr. Cloyd is the crazy and over protective father of the Cloyd family. He is a professional con man (or "sewer") whose double jointed back allows him to fake getting hit by a car of a big company and sue for the insurance money.
- Romeo Bonino – Romeo is the wise carpenter turned sculptor of Sagrado. Once a friend of Josh's father, Josh meets him after hiding in Romeo's woodpile to escape Tarzan one day and sees a nude model inside. Romeo becomes a wise mentor for Josh throughout the book. He goes through a series of wacky but unimportant models who live with him for periods of time. He sculpts boulders of people he admires. At the end of the novel the head of Mr. Arnold appears next to the other boulders he sculpted.
- Dr. Temple – Dr. Temple is a psychiatrist. His wife drives their Rolls-Royce and accompanies him on official visits. They came to Sagrado for the dry air to cure Dr. Temple's supposed breathing illness (that was all in his head). Several times, Josh calls Dr. Temple to treat his mother.

== Setting ==
The novel is set in a fictional county called "Cabezon County". The opening of Chapter 13 reads, "A ratty blue bus makes a daily circle of the little mountain towns in Cabezon County, from Sagrado to the valley at Yunque, and then up through the hills -- San Esteban, San Maria, Villa Galicia, Ojo Amargo, Rio Venado, Rio Conejo, Amorcita and, at the end of the route, nearly 11,000 feet high, La Cima." These town place names are also fictional.

== Critical reception ==
Red Sky at Morning was reviewed by the New York Times in 1968. They wrote that it "succeeds very well in being what its author intended it to be: very entertaining, very readable, very funny. Unnoticed, beneath its always-diverting surface, are the deeper feelings of the people involved until suddenly, very briefly, they break through, and we find that they are real people, serious people, after all, and that what we are reading is not just very skillful entertainment but a novel of consequence".

Harper Lee said “Red Sky at Morning is a minor marvel: it is a novel of paradox, of identity, of an overwhelming YES to life that embraces with wonder what we are pleased to call the human condition. In short, a work of art.”
