= Ernie Roe =

British weightlifter

Personal information
- Nationality: British
- Born: 5 September 1919
- Died: 23 November 2007 (aged 88)

Sport
- Sport: Weightlifting

Ernie Roe (5 September 1919 – 23 November 2007) was a British weightlifter. He competed in the men's light-heavyweight event at the 1948 Summer Olympics.
