= Börje Jeppsson =

Swedish weightlifter

Personal information
- Nationality: Swedish
- Born: 14 February 1929; Eslöv, Sweden
- Died: 19 February 2013 (aged 84); Lund, Sweden

Sport
- Sport: Weightlifting

Börje Jeppsson (14 February 1929 – 19 February 2013) was a Swedish weightlifter. He competed in the men's middle heavyweight event at the 1952 Summer Olympics.
