= Red Sky at Morning (1971 film) =

1971 film by James Goldstone

- Directed by: James Goldstone
- Written by: Richard Bradford (story); Marguerite Roberts
- Produced by: Hal B. Wallis
- Starring: Richard Thomas; Catherine Burns; Desi Arnaz, Jr. Richard Crenna; Claire Bloom; Harry Guardino
- Cinematography: Vilmos Zsigmond
- Edited by: Edward A. Biery; Richard M. Sprague
- Music by: Billy Goldenberg; The Andrews Sisters
- Production company: Hal Wallis Productions
- Distributed by: Universal Pictures
- Release date: May 12, 1971
- Running time: 112 minutes
- Country: United States
- Language: English

Red Sky at Morning is a 1971 American drama film based on the 1968 Richard Bradford novel of the same name. Directed by James Goldstone, it stars Richard Thomas, Catherine Burns, and Desi Arnaz, Jr.

== Plot ==
The film follows Josh Arnold, who moves to Corazon Sagrado, New Mexico, with his mom while his dad serves in the military during World War II. The title of the book/film comes from a line in an ancient mariner's rhyme "Red sky at morning, sailor take warning".

== Cast ==
- Richard Thomas as Joshua Arnold
- Catherine Burns as Marcia Davidson
- Desi Arnaz Jr. as Agostino 'Steenie' Moreno
- Richard Crenna as Frank Arnold
- Claire Bloom as Ann Arnold
- John Colicos as Jimbob Buel
- Harry Guardino as Romeo Bonino
- Strother Martin as John Cloyd
- Nehemiah Persoff as Amadeo Montoya
- Pepe Serna as Chango Lopez
- Joaquin Garay as Ratoncito
- Joy Bang as Corky
- Alma Beltran as Excilda Montoya
- Gregory Sierra as Chamaco

== Reception ==
In The New York Times, Roger Greenspun wrote:

Set in New Mexico during the academic year of 1944‐45, the movie concerns a fine young lad who moves to a new town, enters a new school, makes new friends and new enemies, falls in love, loses his virginity, loses his dad, becomes a man, sets his mother's house in order and enlists in the Navy... rites of passage to end all rites of passage, “Red Sky at Morning” also contains valuable material on race relations, human dignity, doing your own thing, the Odyssey of Homer, and the corruption of the Old South.

I am inclined to attribute this range of illustration less to great ambition than to a ticklish urge to please everybody... [The] plot of “Red Sky at Morning” is so predictable that it might be chanted, without rehearsal, as Ancient Ritual of the Movies...

== Awards ==
The performance by Arnaz earned him the Golden Globe Award as New Star of the Year – Actor of 1972.

== See also ==
- List of American films of 1971
