= Raymond Herbaux =

French weightlifter

Personal information
- Nationality: French
- Born: 22 October 1919 Lille, France
- Died: 21 March 1989 (aged 69) Lille, France

Sport
- Sport: Weightlifting

Raymond Herbaux (22 October 1919 – 21 March 1989) was a French weightlifter. He competed in the men's light-heavyweight event at the 1948 Summer Olympics.
