= Theunis Jonck =

South African weightlifter

Personal information
- Nationality: South African
- Born: 24 January 1926
- Died: 6 April 2012 (aged 86); Cape Town, South Africa

Sport
- Sport: Weightlifting

Theunis Jonck (24 January 1926 – 6 April 2012) was a South African weightlifter. He competed in the men's middle heavyweight event at the 1952 Summer Olympics.
