= Luciano Zardi =

Italian weightlifter (1930-2026)

Personal information
- Nationality: Italian
- Born: 15 September 1930 Ferrara, Italy
- Died: 19 January 2026 Fiscaglia, Italy

Sport
- Sport: Weightlifting

Luciano Zardi (15 September 1930 – 19 January 2026) was an Italian weightlifter. He competed in the men's middle heavyweight event at the 1952 Summer Olympics. He died on 19 January 2026, at the age of 95.
