= Villa Galicia =

Argentine city

Coordinates: 34°46′S 58°23′W

Villa Galicia is a small city in the province of Buenos Aires, Argentina, which is located in the continent of South America. It was named after Galicia (Spain).

Cities, towns and places near Villa Galicia include Jose Marmol, Marmol, Turdera and Temperley. The closest major cities include La Plata, Montevideo, Rosario and Mar del Plata.
