= Alex Bisiak =

Peruvian weightlifter (1919–2009)

Personal information
- Nationality: Peruvian
- Born: 5 August 1919
- Died: 2009 (aged 89–90)

Sport
- Sport: Weightlifting

Alex Bisiak (5 August 1919 – 2009) was a Peruvian weightlifter. He competed in the men's light-heavyweight event at the 1948 Summer Olympics.
