= Jens Jørn Mortensen =

Danish weightlifter (1927–2023)

Personal information
- Nationality: Danish
- Born: 23 February 1927; Skanderborg, Denmark
- Died: 25 May 2023 (aged 96); Aarhus, Denmark

Sport
- Sport: Weightlifting

Jens Jørn Mortensen (23 February 1927 – 25 May 2023) was a Danish weightlifter. He competed in the men's middle heavyweight event at the 1952 Summer Olympics. He died in Aarhus on 25 May 2023, at the age of 96.
