= Lee Yeong-hwan =

South Korean weightlifter

Personal information
- Nationality: South Korean

Sport
- Sport: Weightlifting

Lee Yeong-hwan was a South Korean weightlifter. He competed in the men's light-heavyweight event at the 1948 Summer Olympics.
