= Gheorghe Pițicaru =

Romanian weightlifter (1926–1976)

Personal information
- Nationality: Romanian
- Born: 30 May 1926 Brașov, Romania
- Died: October 1976 (aged 50) Romania

Sport
- Sport: Weightlifting

Gheorghe Pițicaru (30 May 1926 – October 1976) was a Romanian weightlifter. He competed in the men's middle heavyweight event at the 1952 Summer Olympics. Pițicaru died in Romania in October 1976, at the age of 50.
