= Weightlifting at the 1952 Summer Olympics – Men's 90 kg =

Men's 90 kg at the Games of the XV Olympiad
- Venue: Messuhalli
- Date: 27 July 1952
- Competitors: 20 from 20 nations
- Winning total: 445 kg WR

Medalists
1st place, gold medalist(s)		Norbert Schemansky	United States
2nd place, silver medalist(s)		Grigory Novak	Soviet Union
3rd place, bronze medalist(s)		Lennox Kilgour	Trinidad and Tobago

The men's 90 kg weightlifting competitions at the 1952 Summer Olympics in Helsinki took place on 27 July at Messuhalli. It was the first appearance of the middle heavyweight class (or, as it was listed in the 1952 Official Report, the "heavy lightweight" class). Previously all weightlifters above the light heavyweight (82.5 kg) class competed together in the heavyweight class; this new middle heavyweight class featured weightlifters between 82.5 kg and 90 kg.

Each weightlifter had three attempts at each of the three lifts. The best score for each lift was summed to give a total. The weightlifter could increase the weight between attempts (minimum of 5 kg between first and second attempts, 2.5 kg between second and third attempts) but could not decrease weight. If two or more weightlifters finished with the same total, the competitors' body weights were used as the tie-breaker (lighter athlete wins).

== Records ==
Prior to this competition, the existing world and Olympic records were as follows.

World record	Press	Grigory Novak (URS)	143 kg		1952
World record	Snatch	Norbert Schemansky (USA)	133.5 kg	Milan, Italy	28 October 1951
World record	Clean & Jerk	Norbert Schemansky (USA)	175 kg	Milan, Italy	28 October 1951
World record	Total	Norbert Schemansky (USA)	427.5 kg	Milan, Italy	28 October 1951
Olympic record	Press	New event	–	–	–
Olympic record	Snatch	New event	–	–	–
Olympic record	Clean & Jerk	New event	–	–	–
Olympic record	Total	New event	–	–	–

== Results ==
Rank	Athlete	Nation	Body weight	Press (kg)				Snatch (kg)				Clean & Jerk (kg)				Total
Rank	Athlete	Nation	Body weight	1	2	3	Result	1	2	3	Result	1	2	3	Result	Total
1st place, gold medalist(s)	Norbert Schemansky	United States	90.00	122.5	127.5	~~130~~	127.5	130	135	140; ~~142.5~~ (Note: Schemansky was allowed to attempt to extend his world records in the snatch and clean & jerk)	140 WR	165	172.5	177.5; ~~182.5~~	177.5 WR	445 WR
2nd place, silver medalist(s)	Grigory Novak	Soviet Union	87.95	140	~~145~~	~~145~~	140 OR	~~125~~	~~125~~	125	125	145	~~150~~	—	145	410
3rd place, bronze medalist(s)	Lennox Kilgour	Trinidad and Tobago	89.40	120	125	~~130~~	125	112.5	120	~~122.5~~	120	147.5	155	157.5	157.5	402.5
4	Mohamed Ibrahim Saleh	Egypt	89.25	110	~~115~~	~~115~~	110	117.5	122.5	125	125	150	160	162.5	162.5	397.5
5	Firouz Pojhan	Iran	87.95	112.5	~~117.5~~	~~117.5~~	112.5	~~120~~	120	~~125~~	120	150	155	~~160~~	155	387.5
6	Ken McDonald	Australia	88.75	107.5	~~112.5~~	~~112.5~~	107.5	115	120	125	125	152.5	~~170~~	~~170~~	152.5	385
7	Héctor Rensonnet	Argentina	87.35	102.5	~~107.5~~	107.5	107.5	112.5	~~117.5~~	~~117.5~~	112.5	145	150	~~152.5~~	150	370
8	Theunis Jonck	South Africa	89.30	112.5	~~117.5~~	~~117.5~~	112.5	105	110	~~115~~	110	140	145	~~150~~	145	367.5
9	Luciano Zardi	Italy	89.75	95	100	~~105~~	100	110	115	117.5	117.5	140	145	150	150	367.5
10	Kai Outa	Finland	87.45	102.5	107.5	~~110~~	107.5	110	~~115~~	~~115~~	110	132.5	142.5	147.5	147.5	365
11	Börje Jeppsson	Sweden	89.70	107.5	112.5	~~115~~	112.5	102.5	~~107.5~~	107.5	107.5	137.5	142.5	~~147.5~~	142.5	362.5
12	Jorge Soto	Puerto Rico	89.05	107.5	112.5	112.5	107.5	102.5	110	110	110	140	145	145	140	357.5
13	Jørgen Barth-Jørgensen	Norway	89.80	100	~~105~~	~~105~~	100	112.5	~~120~~	~~120~~	112.5	135	142.5	~~145~~	142.5	355
14	Bruno Barabani	Brazil	89.95	92.5	97.5	~~102.5~~	97.5	107.5	~~112.5~~	112.5	112.5	140	145	~~150~~	145	355
15	Jens Jørn Mortensen	Denmark	89.55	95	100	102.5	102.5	100	~~107.5~~	~~107.5~~	100	135	142.5	~~147.5~~	142.5	345
16	Gheorghe Piţicaru	Romania	89.95	90	95	~~97.5~~	95	97.5	~~102.5~~	102.5	102.5	127.5	132.5	~~135~~	132.5	330
17	Melville Barnett	Great Britain	89.55	~~117.5~~	~~117.5~~	117.5	117.5	110	~~115~~	~~115~~	110	~~142.5~~	~~142.5~~	~~142.5~~	—	227.5
18	László Buronyi	Hungary	89.10	~~105~~	105	110	110	110	~~115~~	~~115~~	110	—	—	—	—	220
19	Kamineni Eswara Rao	India	89.40	107.5	~~112.5~~	~~112.5~~	107.5	~~97.5~~	97.5	105	105	~~130~~	~~130~~	~~130~~	—	212.5
20	Robert Allart	Belgium	90.00	110	~~115~~	~~115~~	110	—	—	—	—	—	—	—	—	110

== New records ==
Because the weight class was new to the Olympics, there was certain to be an initial Olympic record in each lift as well as the total. Schemansky, however, broke his own world records from the 1951 World Weightlifting Championships in two of the lifts as well as the combined score. Novak, who had set the world record in the press earlier in the year at 143 kg, was not able to match that score but still led handily in that lift at 140 kg (12.5 kg over Schemansky's second-place 127.5 kg).

Press	140 kg	Grigory Novak (URS)	OR
Snatch	140 kg	Norbert Schemansky (USA)	WR
Clean & Jerk	177.5 kg	Norbert Schemansky (USA)	WR
Total	445 kg	Norbert Schemansky (USA)	WR
