= Marmul District =

Marmul مارمل
- District
- Location within Afghanistan
- Coordinates: 36°37′48″N 67°20′24″E
- Country: Afghanistan
- Province: Balkh
- Elevation: 1,400 m (4,600 ft)

Population (2012)
  - Total: 11,100

Marmul (Dari: مارمل) is a small district, located in the central part of Balkh province in northern Afghanistan. The capital Marmul (also Marmol) is in its southern end on the border with the Chahar Kint district. This district contains the significant naibabad railway station.
