= Hans Eberle (footballer) =

German footballer

- Born: 28 September 1925
- Died: 2 April 1998
- Occupations: Primary school teacher; Football coach

Hans Eberle (28 September 1925 in Ulm – 2 April 1998) was a German footballer who competed in the 1952 Summer Olympics. The right back played for TSG Ulm (1946-1953), where Toni Turek, the 1954 World Champion, was among his teammates, and for the Stuttgart Kickers (1953-1957). After his career, he became a coach. He also worked as a primary school teacher.
