= Richard Bradford (novelist) =

American novelist

- Born: May 1, 1932; Chicago, Illinois
- Died: March 23, 2002 (aged 69); Santa Fe, New Mexico
- Occupations: Novelist, columnist

Richard Bradford (May 1, 1932 – March 23, 2002) was an American novelist, best known for his 1968 novel Red Sky at Morning, a film version of which was released in 1971. He also wrote So Far from Heaven, a novel about the adventures of a disillusioned executive who flees his life in the city for a New Mexico cattle ranch.

The son of Roark Bradford, he was born in Chicago. He resided in Santa Fe, New Mexico, at the time of his death.

Editor's Note from Red Sky At Morning: Commenting on his inclusion in Twentieth Century Western Writers, Richard Bradford wrote in 1982, "I don't consider myself as a western writer, in the sense that Zane Grey, Owen Wister, Jack Schaefer, or Louis L'Amour are western writers."

From the book jacket of Red Sky at Morning: Richard Bradford was born in Chicago and grew up in New Orleans, New York and Santa Fe. He was graduated from Tulane in 1952 and spent three years in the U.S. Marine Corps.

For many years, Richard wrote a column for El Palacio, a quarterly magazine of the Museum of New Mexico. This quarterly wrote a tribute to Richard Bradford entitled, The Man Who Loved New Mexico, shortly after his death on March 23, 2002.

== Novels ==
- Red Sky at Morning. Philadelphia: Lippincott. 1968. ISBN 0-340-04282-6.
- So Far from Heaven. Philadelphia: Lippincott. 1973. ISBN 0-397-00853-8.
