= Kai Outa =

Finnish weightlifter

Personal information
- Nationality: Finnish
- Born: 22 September 1930; Helsinki, Finland
- Died: 5 March 2002 (aged 71); Vihti, Finland

Sport
- Sport: Weightlifting

Kai Outa (22 September 1930 – 5 March 2002) was a Finnish weightlifter. He competed in the men's middle heavyweight event at the 1952 Summer Olympics.
