= Lise Gervais =

Canadian painter and sculptor

- Self-portrait, ca. 1953
- Born: 2 September 1933; Saint-Césaire, Quebec, Canada
- Died: 30 April 1998 (aged 64); Montreal, Quebec, Canada
- Known for: Painting, Sculpture
- Movement: Automatistes

Lise Gervais (1933–1998) was a Canadian abstract painter and sculptor. She was president of the Conseil des Artistes Peintres du Quebec in 1983 and 1984.

== Biography ==
Gervais was born in Saint-Césaire, Quebec on 2 September 1933. She studied painting and sculpture at the École des beaux-arts de Montréal. Her teachers included Jacques de Tonnancour and fr:Stanley Cosgrove, and sculpture with Louis Archambault.

In 1961 she had her first one-woman show at Galerie Denyse Delrue in Montreal. Her style is associated with the Automatistes and Paul-Émile Borduas.

For many years she taught art in Montreal at the Ecole des beaux-arts, the Université du Québec, and Concordia University.

In 1983 she was elected president of the Conseil des Artistes-Peintres du Quebec.

Gervais died on 30 April 1998 in Montreal.

== Exhibitions ==
Selected exhibitions

- 1961 Galerie Denyse Delrue, Montreal; Montreal Museum of Fine Arts
- 1964 Galerie du Siecle, Montreal; National Gallery of Canada, Ottawa
- 1967 Musee du Quebec; Art Gallery of Ontario, Toronto
- 1970 Galerie du Montreal; Musee d’art contemporain de Montreal; Musee Rodin, Paris
- 1983 Bishops University Art Gallery, Lennoxville, PQ
- 1990 Galerie d’Art du College Edouard-Montpetit, Longueuil
- 1993 Galerie d'art Contemporains Montreal PQ, curated by Stanley Borenstein, Karina Holosko, Peter G Pereira
- 2003 McIntosh Gallery, University of Western Ontario, London
