= Marc Akerstream =

Canadian actor (1954–1998)

- Born: 24 May 1954; Vancouver, British Columbia, Canada
- Died: 15 August 1998 (aged 44); Vancouver, British Columbia, Canada
- Cause of death: Head trauma
- Other name: Mark Akerstream
- Occupations: Stunt performer, stunt coordinator, actor
- Years active: 1988–1998

Marc Akerstream (May 24, 1954 – August 15, 1998) was a Canadian stuntman and actor. He was best known for his role as gang leader Tony in the 1995 film Rumble in the Bronx, starring Jackie Chan.

He died of head injuries while on the set of the Canadian television series The Crow: Stairway to Heaven. The accident occurred during filming at Minaty Bay, Vancouver, British Columbia, when he was hit by flying debris while observing an explosion of a rowboat.

== Filmography ==
Year	Title	Role	Notes
1994	Crackerjack	Hood #4	
1995	Rumble in the Bronx	Tony	
1995	Cyberjack	Sol	
1997	Exception to the Rule	Hooded Killer	Uncredited
1997	Wounded	Agent Waring	
1998	Shattered Image	Man in Motorboat	(final film role)
