= Héctor Rensonnet =

Argentine weightlifter

Personal information
- Full name: Francisco Héctor Rensonnet
- Nationality: Argentine
- Born: 9 March 1925

Sport
- Sport: Weightlifting

Héctor Rensonnet (9 March 1925 – 23 April 1998) was an Argentine weightlifter. He competed in the men's middle heavyweight event at the 1952 Summer Olympics.
