= Péter Kiss (mathematician) =

Hungarian mathematician

- Born: March 5, 1937
- Died: March 5, 2002 (aged 65)
- Education: Eötvös Loránd University
- Known for: Number theory
- Scientific career
- Fields: Mathematics

Péter Kiss (March 5, 1937 – March 5, 2002) was a Hungarian mathematician, Doctor of Mathematics, and professor of mathematics at Eszterházy Károly College, who specialized in number theory. In 1992 he won the Albert Szent-Györgyi Prize for his achievements.

== Life ==
He was born in Nagyréde, Hungary, in 1937.

He majored in Mathematics and Physics from Eötvös Loránd University. After graduation, he taught mathematics at Gárdonyi Géza Secondary School in Eger. In 1971 he was appointed to Teacher's College, and in 1972 he began teaching at the Department of Mathematics of Eszterházy Károly University.

He earned the Doctorate of Mathematics degree from the Hungarian Academy of Sciences in 1999.

He was the doctoral advisor for mathematicians like Ferenc Mátyás, Sándor Molnár, Béla Zay, Kálman Liptai, László Szalay. He also assisted other colleagues like Bui Minh Phong, Lászlo Gerőcs, and Pham Van Chung, in the writing of their dissertations.

He was a member of the János Bolyai Mathematical Society, where he held different positions.

Many of his academic papers have been published in the zbMATH database in the Periodica Mathematica Hungarica, in the Proceedings of the Japan Academy, Series A, in Mathematics of Computation, in the Fibonacci Quarterly, and in the American Mathematical Society journals.

== Academic papers ==
- Zuzana Galikova; Bela Laszlo; Péter Kiss (2002). "Remarks On Uniform Density Of Sets Of Integers".
- Péter Kiss; Ferenc Mátyás (2001). "Perfect powers from the sums of terms of linear recurrences". Periodica Mathematica Hungarica. 42 (1): 163–168. doi:10.1023/A:1015209026474. S2CID 35863292.
- Péter Kiss; Zs. Sinka (1991). "On the ratios of the terms of second order linear recurrences". Periodica Mathematica Hungarica. 23 (2): 139–143. doi:10.1007/BF02280665. S2CID 123065838.
- Péter Kiss; Robert F. Tichy (1989). "A discrepancy problem with applications to linear recurrences, I". Proceedings of the Japan Academy, Series A. 65 (1989): 135–138. doi:10.3792/pjaa.65.135.
- Péter Kiss; Robert F. Tichy (1989). "A discrepancy problem with applications to linear recurrences, II". Proceedings of the Japan Academy, Series A. 65 (1989): 191–194. doi:10.3792/pjaa.65.191.
- P. Kiss; F. Mátyás (1989). "An asymptotic formula for". Journal of Number Theory. 31 (3): 255–259. doi:10.1016/0022-314X(89)90072-3.
- Péter Kiss; Bui Minh Phong (1987). "On a Problem of A. Rotkiewicz". Mathematics of Computation. 48 (178): 751. doi:10.2307/2007841. JSTOR 2007841.
- P. Kiss; R. F. Tichy (1987). "On uniform distribution of sequences". Proceedings of the Japan Academy, Series A. 63 (1987): 205–207. doi:10.3792/pjaa.63.205.
- P Kiss; R Tichy (1986). "Distribution of the ratios of the terms of a second order linear recurrence". Indagationes Mathematicae (Proceedings). 89 (1): 79–86. doi:10.1016/1385-7258(86)90008-9.
- P. Kiss (1982). "On common terms of linear recurrences". Acta Mathematica Hungarica. 40 (1): 119–123. doi:10.1007/BF01897310.
- Bui Minh Phong; Péter Kiss (2003). "On Additive Functions Satisfying Congruence Properties". Acta Academiae Paedagogicae Agriensis, Sectio Mathematicae. 30: 123–132.
- Péter Kiss (2001). "On A Simultaneous Approximation Problem Concerning Binary Recurrences". Acta Mathematica Academiae Paedagogicae Nyíregyháziensis. 17 (2): 71–76.
- Péter Kiss; J. P. Jones (1993). "On Points Whose Coordinates Are Terms Of A Linear Recurrence". Fibonacci Quarterly. 31 (3): 239. doi:10.1080/00150517.1993.12429285.
- Kiss, P.; Phong, B.M. (1987). "On a problem of A. Rotkiewicz". Mathematics of Computation. 48 (178). AMS: 751–755. doi:10.2307/2007841. JSTOR 2007841.
