= Frank Damiani =

American football player and coach (1922–1998)

Francis Anthony Damiani (July 27, 1922 – April 28, 1998) was an American football player and coach. Born and in raised in Carnegie, Pennsylvania, Damiani entered Manhattan College as a freshman in 1939. He played football and was a member of the track and field team, carrying a double major in biology and English. He played professionally in the National Football League (NFL) with the New York Giants in 1944, as a tackle. He also played for the First Air Force Aces. Damiani served as the head football coach as Salem College—now known as Salem International University–in Salem, West Virginia from 1947 to 1948. He died on April 28, 1998.

== Family ==
Damiani married Ilda Plebani (May 26, 1926 – April 16, 2015) of Hershey, Pennsylvania, on June 12, 1948. They had four children: Sharon, Philip, Robert, and Mark. They returned to Carnegie in 1949 before the birth of their first child to open a business "The Sports Center".

== Head coaching record ==
Year	Team	Overall	Conference	Standing	Bowl/playoffs
Salem Tigers (West Virginia Intercollegiate Athletic Conference) (1947–1948)
1947	Salem	3–5	2–3	8th	
1948	Salem	3–4–3	2–1–1	4th	
Salem:		6–9–3	4–4–1		
Total:		6–9–3			
