= Jean-Pierre Roche =

Swiss hockey player

Personal information
- Nationality: Swiss
- Born: 10 April 1924
- Died: 3 April 1998 (aged 73) Lausanne, Switzerland

Sport
- Sport: Field hockey

Jean-Pierre Roche (10 April 1924 – 3 April 1998) was a Swiss field hockey player. He competed at the 1948 Summer Olympics and the 1952 Summer Olympics.
