= Jorge Soto (weightlifter) =

Puerto Rican weightlifter

Personal information
- Nationality: Puerto Rican
- Born: 24 December 1921
- Died: 24 December 1973 (aged 52)

Sport
- Sport: Weightlifting

Jorge Soto (24 December 1921 – 24 December 1973) was a Puerto Rican weightlifter. He competed in the men's middle heavyweight event at the 1952 Summer Olympics.
