= Marmol =

- Location in Afghanistan
- Coordinates: 36°40′39″N 66°48′21″E
- Country: Afghanistan
- Province: Balkh Province
- District: Marmul District
- Time zone: + 4.30

Marmol or Marmul is a town and seat of Marmul District in Balkh Province in northern Afghanistan. It is located in the foothills of the Hindu Kush mountains, near the provincial capital of Mazar-i-Sharif.

== See also ==
- Balkh Province
