= Garvin Cross =

Canadian actor and stuntman

- Born: 1970 (age 55–56)
- Other name: Gavin Cross
- Occupations: Stuntman, actor
- Years active: 1988–present

Garvin Cross is a Canadian stuntman, stunt coordinator, and actor. Cross appeared as Angelo in the 1995 martial arts film Rumble in the Bronx, which starred Jackie Chan.

== Career ==
Garvin Cross started his career as Ed Harris's stuntman in the film Needful Things. He later performed as a stuntman in films and television shows Carpool, Deep Rising, Shanghai Noon, Tron: Legacy, Fantastic 4 and Mission: Impossible – Ghost Protocol. Cross has performed stunts for Paul Bettany and Liam Neeson.

Cross has acted in films and television shows Rumble in the Bronx, Blade: Trinity, Battlestar: Galactica, and Marmaduke. He is uncredited as the "Military Snow Commander" in Christopher Nolan's Inception.

He is included in the Guinness Book of World Records for his precision stunt driving, and he has worked on films and television spots for automobile companies Ford, Porsche, Toyota, Dodge, Mercedes, Lincoln, Nissan and Lexus.

Cross is also a stunt coordinator; he has worked on film and television projects Steven Spielberg's Taken, Lost Boys: The Tribe, Big Time Rush, and Sea of Monsters.
