= Wilhelm Pankl =

Austrian weightlifter (1915 – 2002)

Personal information
- Nationality: Austrian
- Born: 25 April 1915
- Died: 22 March 2002 (aged 86)

Sport
- Sport: Weightlifting

Wilhelm Pankl (25 April 1915 – 22 March 2002) was an Austrian weightlifter. He competed in the men's light-heavyweight event at the 1948 Summer Olympics.
