= Sverre Zachariassen =

Norwegian footballer (1919-2002)

Personal information
- Date of birth: 21 June 1919
- Place of birth: Bergen, Norway
- Date of death: 9 March 2002 (aged 82)

International career
Years	Team	Apps	(Gls)
1945	Norway	1	(0)

Sverre Zachariassen (21 June 1919 – 9 March 2002) was a Norwegian footballer. He played in one match for the Norway national football team in 1945.
