= John Larking =

English cricketer (1921–1998)

Personal information
- Full name: John Gordon Larking
- Born: 4 November 1921; Loose, Kent
- Died: 7 April 1998 (aged 76); Aylesbury, Buckinghamshire
- Batting: Right-handed
- Role: Batsman

Domestic team information
- Years: Team
- 1946: Kent

Career statistics
Competition	First-class
Matches	3
Runs scored	15
Batting average	3.00
100s/50s	0/0
Top score	8
Catches/stumpings	2/–
- Source: CricInfo, 4 February 2012

John Gordon Larking (4 November 1921 – 7 April 1998) was an English cricketer who played briefly for Kent County Cricket Club after the Second World War. Larking was a right-handed opening batsman. He was born at Loose in Kent and was educated at Charterhouse School.

At school Larking played as a consistent opening batsman who was described as a "prolific run-getter". Batting in partnership with Anthony Lovett against Harrow School in 1940 the pair scored 250 runs between them in a little over two hours, Larking playing the "far superior innings" to score 129 runs during which he "scarcely made an error". He captained the Charterhouse team in 1940 and was described as an "ideal captain". Larking had toured North America with the Public School team in 1939.

After the war Larking made three first-class cricket appearances for Kent in the 1946 County Championship all in July. He made his debut against Surrey at The Oval before going on to play in the return match at Blackheath and then against Middlesex at Maidstone at the end of the month. He played for the Kent Second XI between 1946 and 1951, making 11 appearances in the Minor Counties Championship as well as playing occasional other matches.

He died at Aylesbury in Buckinghamshire in 1998 aged 76.
