= Rumble in the Bronx =

1995 Hong Kong action comedy film directed by Stanley Tong

- Hong Kong theatrical poster

Chinese name
- Traditional Chinese: 紅番區
- Simplified Chinese: 红番区
- Literal meaning: Red Foreigners District
Transcriptions
Standard Mandarin
- Hanyu Pinyin: hóng fān qū
Yue: Cantonese
- Jyutping: hung^{4} faan^{1} keoi^{1}
- Directed by: Stanley Tong
- Written by: Edward Tang; Fibe Ma
- Produced by: Barbie Tung
- Starring: Jackie Chan; Anita Mui; Françoise Yip
- Cinematography: Jingle Ma
- Edited by: Peter Cheung
- Music by: J. Peter Robinson (original); Nathan Wang (HK re-cut)
- Production companies: New Line Cinema; Paragon Films Ltd.
- Distributed by: New Line Cinema (US); Golden Harvest (HK)
- Release date: 21 January 1995 (HK)
- Running time: 90 minutes (original); 106 minutes (HK re-cut)
- Countries: United States; Hong Kong
- Languages: English; Cantonese
- Budget: US$7.5−13 million
- Box office: US$76 million

Rumble in the Bronx (Chinese: 紅番區; lit. 'Red Foreigners District') is a 1995 American-Hong Kong action comedy film directed by Stanley Tong, and starring Jackie Chan, Anita Mui, Françoise Yip, and Bill Tung. The film is about a Hong Kong police officer (Chan) who arrives in the Bronx area of New York City to meet his uncle and comes up against a local gang of street thugs.

The film was shot in Vancouver, Canada and was released theatrically in Hong Kong on 21 January 1995. A dubbed and re-edited version by American distributor New Line Cinema was released on February 23, 1996, and became Chan's mainstream breakthrough in North America. The film won Best Action Choreography at the 1996 Hong Kong Film Awards.

== Plot ==
Ma Hon Keung, a Hong Kong cop, comes to New York to attend the wedding of his Uncle Bill and his African-American bride-to-be Whitney at his supermarket, which he has sold to a young woman named Elaine. That night, a street gang starts a motorcycle race near Uncle Bill's apartment until Keung jumps down and stops them. He soon starts a feud with the gang after driving them away from Elaine's supermarket, which they tried to rob and vandalize. A series of brawls breaks out in which the bikers try to corner Keung and finish him off. After one attack in which the gang members pelt glass bottles at him, Keung returns home badly injured. His neighbor Nancy, the girlfriend of the bikers' leader Tony, and her younger brother Danny, a Chinese-American paraplegic who has taken a liking to Keung, take care of him and clean his wounds.

When a gang member named Angelo gets involved in an illegal diamond deal gone bad and steals the diamonds, the bikers unwittingly become targets for a large, vicious crime syndicate led by a man named White Tiger. While running away from White Tiger's men, Angelo hides the diamonds in a cushion which is unknowingly used by Keung for Danny's wheelchair. Keung befriends Nancy, and while visiting her at the seedy club she works at, advises her to stay away from crime. After visiting her again, Keung meets the gangsters, who pose as FBI agents and ask him to contact them when he finds the "stolen property" they are looking for. After the bikers inadvertently catch Keung and Nancy meeting in her club one evening, they trash Elaine's supermarket, during which two of Angelo's men are captured by White Tiger's men, who turn up at the supermarket in search of Angelo. Angelo's friends are unaware of his diamond heist, and one is executed in a tree-shredder. Keung and Nancy go to the bikers' headquarters after this latest attack, and Keung engages and defeats them in another brawl.

When the surviving kidnapped biker returns and reports the murder of their comrade, the bikers make peace with Keung and work with him to find Angelo and the diamonds and deliver them to the FBI. When Angelo identifies the false FBI agents, they instantly drop their charade; Tony and Nancy are taken away as hostages, but then Keung and the gangsters guarding him and Danny find the diamonds in the boy's wheelchair. Keung defeats the guards, goes to Elaine's store and calls White Tiger to propose an exchange, but White Tiger refuses his demands and wrecks the supermarket to make his point. Keung decides to involve the police, who have been trying to get a solid case on White Tiger for years, but the handover is botched; White Tiger's men hijack a hovercraft and are pursued by Keung and the police through the city streets. Keung ends the chase by using a jagged sword from an antiquity store and a commandeered vehicle to sidesweep the hovercraft and shred its rubber skirt, crashing the vehicle.

After forcing the syndicate men to reveal Tony and Nancy's location, and after freeing them, Keung drives the repaired hovercraft to a golf course where White Tiger is playing. With the police's approval and in Elaine, Tony and Nancy's company, Keung invades the golf course and runs White Tiger down, leaving him on the ground with his clothes shredded.

== Cast ==
- Jackie Chan as Ma Hon Keung (T: 馬漢強, S: 马汉强, P: Mǎ Hànqiáng)
- Anita Mui as Elaine
- Françoise Yip as Nancy
- Bill Tung as Uncle Bill Ma (T: 馬 驃, S: 马 骠, J: maa5 piu3, P: Mǎ Piào)
- Marc Akerstream as Tony
- Garvin Cross as Angelo
- Morgan Lam as Danny
- Kris Lord as White Tiger, the syndicate boss
- Carrie Cain Sparks as Whitney Ma
- Yueh Hua as Walter Wah, the Realtor (T: 華, S: 华)
- Eddy Ko as Prospective market buyer
- Emil Chau as Ice cream salesman
- Alex To as Ice cream customer
- Rainbow Ching as Mrs Cheung, worker in supermarket mistaken by Keung as Bill's wife-to-be
- Jordan Lennox as Jordan, a syndicate member with glasses
- Gabriel Ostevic as Gabriel, a syndicate member with a buzz cut who Keung subdues in Danny's apartment
- John Sampson, Richard Faraci, Terry Howsen, Mark Fielding, and Owen Walstrom as syndicate members
- Alan Sit Chun-wan and Richard Epcar as Tony's gang members
- Alf Humphreys as a Police Officer

== Production ==
Jackie Chan's right foot lands at a bad angle after jumping onto the hoverboat, causing a serious injury that would not heal for the remainder of filming. The shot still made it into the finished movie.

In his autobiography, I am Jackie Chan: My life in Action, Jackie Chan talked about the initial difficulty of filming a movie in Vancouver that is set in New York. The production team initially had to put up fake graffiti during the day and take it all down during the evening, while simultaneously making sure that no mountains made it into the background. However, Chan decided that it was best that the production team focus on the action only without worrying too much about scenery. In his review, Roger Ebert notes that there are mountains in the background, which are not present in the NYC landscape. There is also an NYC helicopter which displays a Canadian civil registration (C-GZPM - A Bell JetRanger).

The original spoken dialogue consisted of all of the actors speaking their native language most of the time. In the completely undubbed soundtrack, available on the Warner Japanese R2 DVD release, Jackie Chan actually speaks his native Cantonese while Françoise Yip and Morgan Lam (the actors playing Nancy and Danny) speak English. All of the original dialogue was intended to be dubbed over in the international and Hong Kong film markets, and New Line Cinema overdubbed and slightly changed the original English dialogue.

During filming, Chan broke his right ankle while performing a stunt. He spent much of the remaining shooting time with one foot in a cast. When it came to the film's climax, the crew colored a sock to resemble the shoe on his good foot, which Chan wore over his cast. His foot still had not completely healed when he went on to shoot his next film, Thunderbolt (filmed the same year, 1994, but released earlier in the U.S.).

The film had a production budget of US$7.5−13 million.

== Release ==
The film was the first Chinese film to be simultaneously released in China, Hong Kong and Taiwan.

New Line Cinema acquired the film for international distribution and commissioned a new music score and English dub (with participation from Jackie Chan). A scene of Keung's airplane flying into John F. Kennedy International Airport was added to the opening credits. Three scenes were added exclusively for the international version: a shot of the syndicate's car pulling up to the diamond deal, Keung and Nancy escaping from the nightclub after the bikers spot them together, and White Tiger taking a golf shot before a subordinate approaches him with his phone. None of these scenes were in the original Hong Kong release. In comparison to the Hong Kong version, 17 minutes of cuts were made, and the new English dub changed some of the context of the characters' conversations. Keung being a cop and having a girlfriend in Hong Kong is never mentioned. Keung's father being shot by a robber years ago is also not mentioned. In the New Line Cinema edit, Elaine buys the grocery store upon her first meeting with Uncle Bill, but in the Hong Kong version, she decides to buy the market at Bill's wedding.

The new soundtrack replaced Chan's song over the closing credits with the song "Kung Fu" by the band Ash, the lyrics of which mention Jackie Chan, as well as other Asian figures and characters ubiquitous in the west.

== Reception ==
=== Box office ===
In Hong Kong, Rumble in the Bronx broke the box office record, earning HK$56,911,136, making it the highest-grossing film in Hong Kong up until then. In China, within ten days of release, the film grossed CN¥100 million (US$15 million) from 10 million tickets sold at CN¥10 each. It set a record in Guangzhou, with CN¥3 million grossed in the city. It became the highest-grossing imported film in China up until then, grossing CN¥110 million (US$16.11 million). It was the year's eighth highest-grossing film in Taiwan, earning NT$53,787,720. In Japan, the film earned ¥635 million at the box office. In South Korea, it was the highest-grossing film of the year, selling 941,433 tickets and earning US$5.08 million.

Box office performance
| Market | Year | Gross revenue (est.) | | Ticket sales (est.) | Ref |
| Market | Year | Local currency | US dollars | Ticket sales (est.) | Ref |
|---|---|---|---|---|---|
| Hong Kong | 1995 | HK$56,911,136 | $7,356,820 | 1,200,000 | |
| China | 1995 | CN¥110 million | $16,110,000 | 11,000,000 | |
| Taiwan | 1995 | NT$53,787,720 | $2,060,705 | 295,892 | |
| Japan | 1995 | ¥635,000,000 | $6,751,000 | 510,000 | |
| South Korea | 1995 | ₩3,918,068,535 | $5,080,000 | 941,433 | |
| North America | 1996 | US$32,392,047 | $32,392,047 | 7,361,000 | |
| Germany | 1996 | €1,816,000 | $2,306,000 | 349,325 | |
| Italy | 1996 | €270,000 | $343,000 | 58,773 | |
| Switzerland | 1996 | €173,000 | $220,000 | 20,571 | |
| Sweden | 1996 | €132,000 | $168,000 | 18,556 | |
| Belgium | 1996 | €69,000 | $88,000 | 13,505 | |
| Denmark | 1996 | €19,000 | $24,000 | 3,162 | |
| Czech Republic | 1996 | €1,100 | $1,397 | 1,222 | |
| Spain | 1996 | €318,000 | $361,000 | 96,309 | |
| Spain | 1997 | €9,330 | $10,580 | 2,744 | |
| United Kingdom | 1997 | £965,700 | $1,581,000 | 237,271 | |
| Hungary | 1997 | €76,000 | $86,000 | 54,116 | |
| Romania | 1997 | ROL1,184,620,000 | $86,000 | 40,709 | |
| Romania | 1998 | ROL2,132,320,000 | $40,000 | 40,535 | |
| Romania | 1999 | ROL470,000 | $9 | 11 | |
| France | 1998 | €1,086,000 | $1,232,000 | 204,894 | |
| Total | | US$76,297,558 | | 22,450,028 | |
| Inflation adjusted (2021) | | US$154,476,114 | | | |

The film was Chan's mainstream breakthrough in North America. When the film made its North American premiere at the Sundance Film Festival in January 1996, the film drew overwhelmingly positive reactions from large crowds cheering loudly, comparable to a sold-out concert. It eventually got a wide release in February 1996. Opening on 1,736 North American screens, it was number one at the box office in its opening weekend, grossing US$9,858,380 ($5,678 per screen). It became one of the year's top 20 highest-grossing R-rated films, finishing its North American run with $32,392,047 (equivalent to $69 million adjusted for inflation in 2021). In the United Kingdom, the film sold 237,271 tickets and grossed £965,700. In France and Germany, the film sold 493,756 tickets. In other European countries, the film sold 460,254 tickets.

It became Chan's biggest ever hit up until then, with a worldwide box office gross of over US$76 million (equivalent to over $154 million adjusted for inflation in 2021). It was the most profitable film of 1996, with its US box office alone earning over 6 times its $13 million budget.

=== Critical response ===
When released in North America, Rumble in the Bronx received generally positive reviews, with most critics happy that a Jackie Chan film was finally getting a wide theatrical release in North America. On Rotten Tomatoes the film has an 81% approval rating based on reviews from 53 critics, with an average rating of 6.5/10. Most critics praised the action, stunts, and Chan's charm, but found the plot and acting to be lacking.

Roger Ebert gave the film a positive review, rating it 3 out of 4 stars. His review for the Chicago Sun-Times stated:

Any attempt to defend this movie on rational grounds is futile. Don't tell me about the plot and the dialogue. Don't dwell on the acting. The whole point is Jackie Chan – and, like Astaire and Rogers, he does what he does better than anybody. There is a physical confidence, a grace, an elegance to the way he moves. There is humor to the choreography of the fights (which are never too gruesome). He's having fun. If we allow ourselves to get in the right frame of mind, so are we.

Nate Jones in The Daily Utah Chronicle rated the film 3 1/2 stars. He described Chan as "the biggest action hero in the world" like a cross between Bruce Lee, Bruce Willis, Charlie Chaplin, and Harrison Ford, and said Chan "has brought the Kung-Fu action picture" genre "roaring back to life" in American pop culture. He praised the action choreography as "a masterfully seamless wave, proving that acting and fighting can coexist, if they're in the hands of a virtuoso." However, he criticized the English dubbing.

In a 1995 review for the Hong Kong Film Critics Society, Stephen Teo panned the film as "at best, an average Jackie Chan picture." He noted that despite the final hovercraft set piece, the action "is offset by the comedy underpinnings of the thin plot." In 1996, Asiaweek placed Rumble in the Bronx in its list of best films for that year.

=== Awards and nominations ===
- 1996 Hong Kong Film Awards
  - Winner: Best Action Choreography (Jackie Chan, Stanley Tong)
  - Nomination: Best Actor (Jackie Chan)
  - Nomination: Best Actress (Anita Mui)
  - Nomination: Best Film Editing (Peter Cheung)
  - Nomination: Best New Performer (Françoise Yip)
  - Nomination: Best Picture (Barbie Tang)
  - Nomination: Best Supporting Actress (Françoise Yip)
- 1997 Key Art Awards
  - Winner: Best of Show – Audiovisual
    For the "Ben Knows" comedy TV spot
- 1996 MTV Movie Awards
  - Nomination: Best Fight (Jackie Chan)

=== Television ===
In the United Kingdom, the film was watched by 1.1 million viewers on BBC1 in 2008, making it the year's most-watched foreign-language film on BBC. It was later watched by 1.2 million UK viewers on BBC1 in 2009, making it the year's most-watched foreign-language film on UK television. In 2011, it was again the year's most-watched foreign-language film on UK television with 900,000 viewers on BBC1. Combined, the film drew at least 3.2 million UK television viewership on BBC1 between 2008 and 2011.

== Home video ==
The majority of DVD versions of the film contain the heavily edited US New Line Cinema cut, with the relevant dubs created for each market. However, other versions exist, which are closer to the original theatrical release.

On March 27, 2026, Arrow Video announced that they would release both the international cut of the film as well as the Hong Kong theatrical cut on Blu-ray, as part of the "Jackie Chan's Breakout Hits" box set.

=== Warner ===
- A DVD was produced by Warner Brothers HK for Hong Kong and South Korea. This contains the New Line Cinema version with additional abridged Cantonese and Mandarin soundtracks. It has an aspect ratio of 2.35:1, but includes no English subtitles.
- Warner Home Video also released a DVD in Japan of the Hong Kong version. This version contains the Hong Kong cut of the film. The dialogue is completely undubbed in a mono 2.0. However, its aspect ratio is cropped to 1.85:1 and contains no English subtitles.
- In Hong Kong, a VCD containing the Hong Kong version in Cantonese, with newly generated English and Chinese subtitles was also released. It's 2.35:1.
- A Blu-ray was released in the United States on 6 October 2015.

=== Thakral/Chinastar ===
It appears that a joint-distribution deal was made, with Thakral releasing the film in China, and Chinastar releasing it in Hong Kong. This version contains no credits, not even the film title, but is otherwise the Hong Kong version. There are no English subtitles and the ratio is roughly 2.10:1.

=== Speedy ===
Malaysian distributor Speedy released a VCD. As well as local censorship (for profanity - also featuring a substituted shots of Angelo insulting Keung), it has a slightly different Cantonese/English soundtrack (some characters are dubbed in Cantonese); there are English, Chinese and Malay subtitles languages. It is cropped to approximately 1:85:1 and distorted to 1:56:1.

=== Funny ===
The film had three separate DVD releases by Taiwanese distributor Funny. Two of these DVDs feature the Taiwanese Mandarin-dubbed version with embedded subtitles. One of these contains a Dolby 5.1 soundtrack only, whilst the other contains both Dolby and DTS soundtracks. The third release is a double-sided disc, featuring the Taiwanese Mandarin dub on one side and the English-dubbed New Line Cinema version on the other. Despite containing a dubbed soundtrack, these DVDs are the only releases to contain English subtitles for a Chinese version. All three are presented in 2.35:1.

=== 4 Film Favorites ===
- Another DVD was released as part of the 4 Film Favorites: Martial Arts collection. The release is exactly like the New Line Cinema version. The film is also attached to The Corruptor, Showdown in Little Tokyo, and Bloodsport.

== See also ==
- Jackie Chan filmography
- List of Hong Kong films
