= Grigory Novak =

Soviet weightlifter (1919–1980)

Personal information
- Born: 5 March 1919 Chernobyl, Ukrainian People's Republic
- Died: 10 July 1980 (aged 61) Moscow, Russian SFSR, Soviet Union
- Height: 1.60 m (5 ft 3 in)

Sport
- Sport: Weightlifting
- Club: Dynamo Moscow
Medal record
Representing the Soviet Union
Olympic Games
Silver medal – second place	1952 Helsinki	-90 kg
World Championships
Gold medal – first place	1946 Paris	-82.5 kg
European Championships
Gold medal – first place	1947 Helsinki	-82.5 kg
Gold medal – first place	1952 Helsinki	-90 kg

Grigory Irmovich Novak (Russian: Григорий Ирмович Новак, 5 March 1919 – 10 July 1980) was a Soviet weightlifter who won a world title in 1946 and a silver medal at the 1952 Summer Olympics. During his career Novak set more than 50 world records, but only 18 became official: 14 in the press and 4 in the snatch.

As a child he worked in building construction alongside his father, and between 1933 and 1938 was an acrobat and juggler at a circus. In 1937, after the family moved to Kiev, Grigory seriously decided to go in for sports and enrolled in the wrestling section of the Dynamo society. He then started training in wrestling and weightlifting and finished second at the Soviet Weightlifting Championships in 1939. He won the national title in various weight categories in 1940, 1943, 1944–1946, 1948–49 and 1951.

After the 1952 Olympics, Novak retired from competitions and returned to the circus, where he worked as a strongman, weight juggler and choreographer until his death at the age of 61. He juggled with 30–40 kg weights, and his trademark feats included lifting large platforms on which several people were performing various activities, such as acrobatics, cycling and weightlifting. His two sons, Arkady and Roman, were also strongmen and acrobats, and they performed in the circus alongside his father.

Novak died of a heart attack while preparing his part of the 1980 Olympic entertainment program.
