= László Buronyi =

Hungarian weightlifter (1918–1982)

Personal information
- Nationality: Hungarian
- Born: 27 November 1918 Krompachy, Austria-Hungary
- Died: 1982 (aged 63–64) Budapest, Hungary

Sport
- Sport: Weightlifting

László Buronyi (27 November 1918 – 1982) was a Hungarian weightlifter. He competed at the 1948 Summer Olympics and the 1952 Summer Olympics. Buronyi died in Budapest in 1982.
