= List of East German Athletics Championships winners =

The East German Athletics Championships (German: DDR Leichtathletik-Meisterschaften) was an annual outdoor track and field competition organised by the East German Athletics Federation, which served as the East German national championships for the sport. The three- or four-day event was held in summer months, varying from late June to early September, and the venue changed on an annual basis. The winners were exclusively East Germans.

It was first held in 1948 following the division of Germany, initially known as the Eastern Zone Athletics Championships for the first two years. The final edition was held in 1990, at which point it ended and was succeeded by the all-Germany German Athletics Championships.

== Men ==
=== 100 metres ===
- 1960: Klaus Schüler
- 1961: Hans Pollex
- 1962: Heinz Erbstößer
- 1963: Dietmar Falgowski
- 1964: Heinz Erbstößer
- 1965: Heinz Erbstößer
- 1966: Harald Eggers
- 1967: Harald Eggers
- 1968: Heinz Erbstößer
- 1969: Detlef Lewandowski
- 1970: Siegfried Schenke
- 1971: Siegfried Schenke
- 1972: Bernd Borth
- 1973: Hans-Jürgen Bombach
- 1974: Manfred Kokot
- 1975: Klaus-Dieter Kurrat
- 1976: Klaus-Dieter Kurrat
- 1977: Eugen Ray
- 1978: Eugen Ray
- 1979: Olaf Prenzler
- 1980: Eugen Ray
- 1981: Frank Emmelmann
- 1982: Frank Emmelmann
- 1983: Thomas Schröder
- 1984: Thomas Schröder
- 1985: Frank Emmelmann
- 1986: Thomas Schröder
- 1987: Steffen Bringmann
- 1988: Sven Matthes
- 1989: Steffen Bringmann
- 1990: Steffen Görmer

=== 200 metres ===
- 1960: Helmuth Opitz
- 1961: Sigismund Kostulski
- 1962: Heinz Erbstößer
- 1963: Heinz Erbstößer
- 1964: Heinz Erbstößer
- 1965: Heinz Erbstößer
- 1966: Heinz Erbstößer
- 1967: Harald Eggers
- 1968: Hartmut Schelter
- 1969: Detlef Lewandowski
- 1970: Siegfried Schenke
- 1971: Jörg Pfeifer
- 1972: Siegfried Schenke
- 1973: Hans-Jürgen Bombach
- 1974: Hans-Jürgen Bombach
- 1975: Hans-Joachim Zenk
- 1976: Klaus-Dieter Kurrat
- 1977: Bernhard Hoff
- 1978: Olaf Prenzler
- 1979: Bernhard Hoff
- 1980: Bernhard Hoff
- 1981: Frank Emmelmann
- 1982: Detlef Kübeck
- 1983: Olaf Prenzler
- 1984: Frank Emmelmann
- 1985: Frank Emmelmann
- 1986: Thomas Schröder
- 1987: Frank Emmelmann
- 1988: Frank Emmelmann
- 1989: Steffen Schwabe
- 1990: Torsten Heimrath

=== 400 metres ===
- 1960: Karl Storm
- 1961: Gottfried Klimbt
- 1962: Edgar Benkwitz
- 1963: Arthur Speer
- 1964: Arthur Speer
- 1965: Hartmut Schwabe
- 1966: Wilfried Weiland
- 1967: Wilfried Weiland
- 1968: Michael Zerbes
- 1969: Wolfgang Müller
- 1970: Wolfgang Müller
- 1971: Klaus Hauke
- 1972: Wolfgang Müller
- 1973: Andreas Scheibe
- 1974: Andreas Scheibe
- 1975: Dietmar Krug
- 1976: Günter Arnold
- 1977: Jürgen Utikal
- 1978: Frank Richter
- 1979: Frank Schaffer
- 1980: Frank Schaffer
- 1981: Andreas Knebel
- 1982: Andreas Knebel
- 1983: Thomas Schönlebe
- 1984: Thomas Schönlebe
- 1985: Thomas Schönlebe
- 1986: Mathias Schersing
- 1987: Thomas Schönlebe
- 1988: Thomas Schönlebe
- 1989: Matthias Schrober
- 1990: Jens Carlowitz

=== 800 metres ===
- 1960: Manfred Matuschewski
- 1961: Manfred Matuschewski
- 1962: Manfred Matuschewski
- 1963: Manfred Matuschewski
- 1964: Manfred Matuschewski
- 1965: Manfred Matuschewski
- 1966: Manfred Matuschewski
- 1967: Rainer Fähse
- 1968: Dieter Fromm
- 1969: Manfred Matuschewski
- 1970: Ullrich Schmidt
- 1971: Dieter Fromm
- 1972: Dieter Fromm
- 1973: Hans-Henning Ohlert
- 1974: Hans-Henning Ohlert
- 1975: Dieter Fromm
- 1976: Olaf Beyer
- 1977: Olaf Beyer
- 1978: Detlef Wagenknecht
- 1979: Olaf Beyer
- 1980: Detlef Wagenknecht
- 1981: Olaf Beyer
- 1982: Detlef Wagenknecht
- 1983: Detlef Wagenknecht
- 1984: Detlef Wagenknecht
- 1985: Ralph Schumann
- 1986: Hans-Joachim Mogalle
- 1987: Jens-Peter Herold
- 1988: Ralph Schumann
- 1989: Jens-Peter Herold
- 1990: Ralph Schumann

=== 1500 metres ===
- 1960: Siegfried Valentin
- 1961: Siegfried Valentin
- 1962: Jürgen May
- 1963: Karl-Heinz Kruse
- 1964: Siegfried Valentin
- 1965: Jürgen May
- 1966: Jürgen May
- 1967: Mathias Siedler
- 1968: Dieter Fromm
- 1969: Manfred Matuschewski
- 1970: Klaus-Peter Justus
- 1971: Bernd Exner
- 1972: Klaus-Peter Justus
- 1973: Klaus-Peter Justus
- 1974: Klaus-Peter Justus
- 1975: Klaus-Peter Justus
- 1976: Gerhard Stolle
- 1977: Jürgen Straub
- 1978: Jürgen Straub
- 1979: Jürgen Straub
- 1980: Jürgen Straub
- 1981: Olaf Beyer
- 1982: Olaf Beyer
- 1983: Andreas Busse
- 1984: Andreas Busse
- 1985: Olaf Beyer
- 1986: Andreas Busse
- 1987: Jens-Peter Herold
- 1988: Jens-Peter Herold
- 1989: Jens-Peter Herold
- 1990: Jens-Peter Herold

=== 5000 metres ===
- 1960: Gerhard Hönicke
- 1961: Gerhard Hönicke
- 1962: Arthur Hannemann
- 1963: Friedrich Janke
- 1964: Siegfried Herrmann
- 1965: Siegfried Herrmann
- 1966: Siegfried Herrmann
- 1967: Gerd Eisenberg
- 1968: Bernd Dießner
- 1969: Jürgen Haase
- 1970: Gerd Eisenberg
- 1971: Bernd Dießner
- 1972: Frank Eisenberg
- 1973: Wilfried Scholz
- 1974: Manfred Kuschmann
- 1975: Manfred Kuschmann
- 1976: Jörg Peter
- 1977: Jörg Peter
- 1978: Jörg Peter
- 1979: Ralf Pönitzsch
- 1980: Jörg Peter
- 1981: Hansjörg Kunze
- 1982: Werner Schildhauer
- 1983: Hansjörg Kunze
- 1984: Hansjörg Kunze
- 1985: Werner Schildhauer
- 1986: Hansjörg Kunze
- 1987: Hansjörg Kunze
- 1988: Axel Krippschock
- 1989: Stephan Freigang
- 1990: Carsten Eich

=== 10,000 metres ===
- 1960: Bruno Bartholome
- 1961: Friedrich Janke
- 1962: Friedrich Janke
- 1963: Friedrich Janke
- 1964: Siegfried Herrmann
- 1965: Jürgen Haase
- 1966: Jürgen Haase
- 1967: Paul Krebs
- 1968: Jürgen Haase
- 1969: Jürgen Busch
- 1970: Jürgen Haase
- 1971: Konstantin Popow
- 1972: Jürgen Haase
- 1973: Jürgen Haase
- 1974: Manfred Kuschmann
- 1975: Lutz Obschonka
- 1976: Lutz Obschonka
- 1977: Jörg Peter
- 1978: Karl-Heinz Leiteritz
- 1979: Waldemar Cierpinski
- 1980: Waldemar Cierpinski
- 1981: Werner Schildhauer
- 1982: Werner Schildhauer
- 1983: Werner Schildhauer
- 1984: Hansjörg Kunze
- 1985: Werner Schildhauer
- 1986: Hansjörg Kunze
- 1987: Hansjörg Kunze
- 1988: Hansjörg Kunze
- 1989: Hagen Melzer
- 1990: Carsten Eich

=== 25K run ===
- 1962: Gerhard Hönicke
- 1963: Arthur Hannemann
- 1964: Klaus Böttger
- 1965: Gerhard Hönicke

=== Marathon ===
- 1960: Günter Havenstein
- 1961: Bruno Bartholome
- 1962: Gerhard Hönicke
- 1963: Heinrich Hagen
- 1964: Gerhard Hönicke
- 1965: Gerhard Hönicke
- 1966: Gerhard Lange
- 1967: Jürgen Busch
- 1968: Paul Krebs
- 1969: Steffen Gottert
- 1970: Joachim Truppel
- 1971: Jürgen Vesper
- 1972: Jürgen Busch
- 1973: Joachim Truppel
- 1974: Bernd Arnhold
- 1975: Joachim Truppel
- 1976: Karl-Heinz Baumbach
- 1977: Holger Runge
- 1978: Waldemar Cierpinski
- 1979: Joachim Truppel
- 1980: Martin Schröder
- 1981: Matthias Böckler
- 1982: Waldemar Cierpinski
- 1983: Stephan Seidemann
- 1984: Frank Konzack
- 1985: Jörg Peter
- 1986: Uwe Koch
- 1987: Michael Heilmann
- 1988: Rainer Wachenbrunner
- 1989: Steffen Dittmann
- 1990: Klaus Goldammer

=== 3000 metres steeplechase ===
- 1960: Fred Döring
- 1961: Hermann Buhl
- 1962: Hermann Buhl
- 1963: Rainer Dörner
- 1964: Fred Döring
- 1965: Dieter Hartmann
- 1966: Dieter Hartmann
- 1967: Dieter Hermann
- 1968: Dieter Hermann
- 1969: Dieter Hermann
- 1970: Ulrich Holbeck
- 1971: Dieter Hermann
- 1972: Waldemar Cierpinski
- 1973: Jürgen Straub
- 1974: Jürgen Straub
- 1975: Jürgen Straub
- 1976: Ralf Pönitzsch
- 1977: Ralf Pönitzsch
- 1978: Gerhard Wetzig
- 1979: Ralf Pönitzsch
- 1980: Hagen Melzer
- 1981: Ralf Pönitzsch
- 1982: Rainer Wachenbrunner
- 1983: Hagen Melzer
- 1984: Rainer Wachenbrunner
- 1985: Hagen Melzer
- 1986: Hagen Melzer
- 1987: Hagen Melzer
- 1988: Hagen Melzer
- 1989: Hagen Melzer
- 1990: Uwe Pflügner

=== 110 metres hurdles ===
- 1960: Hans Reimers
- 1961: Herbert Widera
- 1962: Hans-Werner Regenbrecht
- 1963: Hans-Werner Regenbrecht
- 1964: Christian Voigt
- 1965: Christian Voigt
- 1966: Richard Stotz
- 1967: Richard Stotz
- 1968: Richard Stotz
- 1969: Raimund Bethge
- 1970: Frank Siebeck
- 1971: Frank Siebeck
- 1972: Frank Siebeck
- 1973: Frank Siebeck
- 1974: Frank Siebeck
- 1975: Thomas Munkelt
- 1976: Thomas Munkelt
- 1977: Thomas Munkelt
- 1978: Thomas Munkelt
- 1979: Thomas Munkelt
- 1980: Thomas Munkelt
- 1981: Andreas Schlißke
- 1982: Thomas Munkelt
- 1983: Thomas Munkelt
- 1984: Thomas Munkelt
- 1985: Oliver Grawe
- 1986: Holger Pohland
- 1987: Andreas Oschkenat
- 1988: Holger Pohland
- 1989: Holger Pohland
- 1990: Holger Pohland

=== 200 metres hurdles ===
- 1961: Herbert Widera
- 1962: Joachim Singer
- 1963: W. Skarus
- 1964: Joachim Singer
- 1965: G. Schenk

=== 400 metres hurdles ===
- 1960: Christian Hille
- 1961: Herbert Widera
- 1962: Joachim Singer
- 1963: Joachim Singer
- 1964: Joachim Singer
- 1965: Werner Schiedewitz
- 1966: Joachim Singer
- 1967: Bernd Hopfer
- 1968: Lutz Waldner
- 1969: Christian Rudolph
- 1970: Christian Rudolph
- 1971: Christian Rudolph
- 1972: Christian Rudolph
- 1973: Jürgen Laser
- 1974: Klaus Schönberger
- 1975: Jochen Mayer
- 1976: Jochen Mayer
- 1977: Klaus Schönberger
- 1978: Manfred Konow
- 1979: Manfred Konow
- 1980: Volker Beck
- 1981: Volker Beck
- 1982: Uwe Ackermann
- 1983: Volker Beck
- 1984: Manfred Konow
- 1985: Hans-Jürgen Ende
- 1986: Ingo Krüger
- 1987: Uwe Ackermann
- 1988: Uwe Ackermann
- 1989: Hans-Jürgen Ende
- 1990: Daniel Blochwitz

=== High jump ===
- 1960: Werner Pfeil
- 1961: Gerd Dührkop
- 1962: Gerd Dührkop
- 1963: Gerd Dührkop
- 1964: Werner Pfeil
- 1965: Waldemar Schütz
- 1966: Werner Pfeil
- 1967: Rudi Köppen
- 1968: Rudi Köppen
- 1969: Herbert Hüttl
- 1970: Herbert Hüttl
- 1971: Gerd Dührkop
- 1972: Stefan Junge
- 1973: Stefan Junge
- 1974: Rolf Beilschmidt
- 1975: Rolf Beilschmidt
- 1976: Rolf Beilschmidt
- 1977: Rolf Beilschmidt
- 1978: Rolf Beilschmidt
- 1979: Rolf Beilschmidt
- 1980: Gerd Wessig
- 1981: Rolf Beilschmidt
- 1982: Jörg Freimuth
- 1983: Andreas Sam
- 1984: Gerd Wessig
- 1985: Gerd Wessig
- 1986: Gerd Wessig
- 1987: Matthias Grebenstein
- 1988: Gerd Wessig
- 1989: Gerd Wessig
- 1990: Uwe Bellmann

=== Pole vault ===
- 1960: Manfred Preußger
- 1961: Peter Laufer
- 1962: Manfred Preußger
- 1963: Manfred Preußger
- 1964: Manfred Preußger
- 1965: Wolfgang Nordwig
- 1966: Wolfgang Nordwig
- 1967: Wolfgang Nordwig
- 1968: Wolfgang Nordwig
- 1969: Wolfgang Nordwig
- 1970: Wolfgang Nordwig
- 1971: Wolfgang Nordwig
- 1972: Wolfgang Nordwig
- 1973: Manfred Frühauf
- 1974: Wolfgang Reinhardt
- 1975: Peter Wienick
- 1976: Axel Weber
- 1977: Axel Weber
- 1978: Wolfgang Reinhardt
- 1979: Axel Weber
- 1980: Axel Weber
- 1981: Axel Weber
- 1982: Steffen Giebe
- 1983: Olaf Kasten
- 1984: Andreas Kramss
- 1985: Christoph Pietz
- 1986: Uwe Langhammer
- 1987: Uwe Langhammer
- 1988: Uwe Langhammer
- 1989: Uwe Langhammer
- 1990: Uwe Langhammer

=== Long jump ===
- 1960: Karl Thierfelder
- 1961: Klaus Beer
- 1962: Klaus Beer
- 1963: Arndt Kluge
- 1964: Klaus Beer
- 1965: Udo Vogel
- 1966: Udo Vogel
- 1967: Klaus Beer
- 1968: Klaus Beer
- 1969: Klaus Beer
- 1970: Klaus Beer
- 1971: Max Klauß
- 1972: Max Klauß
- 1973: Max Klauß
- 1974: Max Klauß
- 1975: Peter Rieger
- 1976: Frank Wartenberg
- 1977: Erwin Plöger
- 1978: Frank Paschek
- 1979: Lutz Dombrowski
- 1980: Frank Paschek
- 1981: Uwe Lange
- 1982: Uwe Lange
- 1983: Frank Nowak
- 1984: Lutz Dombrowski
- 1985: Uwe Lange
- 1986: Ron Beer
- 1987: Marco Delonge
- 1988: Ron Beer
- 1989: Marco Delonge
- 1990: André Müller

=== Triple jump ===
- 1960: Karl Thierfelder
- 1961: Hans-Jürgen Rückborn
- 1962: Manfred Hinze
- 1963: Hans-Jürgen Rückborn
- 1964: Klaus Neumann
- 1965: Hans-Jürgen Rückborn
- 1966: Siegfried Dähne
- 1967: Hans-Jürgen Rückborn
- 1968: Heinz-Günter Schenk
- 1969: Jörg Drehmel
- 1970: Jörg Drehmel
- 1971: Jörg Drehmel
- 1972: Jörg Drehmel
- 1973: Heinz-Günter Schenk
- 1974: Jörg Drehmel
- 1975: Hans-Dieter Haberland
- 1976: Klaus Hufnagel
- 1977: Klaus Hufnagel
- 1978: Lothar Gora
- 1979: Klaus Hufnagel
- 1980: Klaus Hufnagel
- 1981: Matthias Schröder
- 1982: Heiko Fermumm
- 1983: Axel Gross
- 1984: Volker Mai
- 1985: Dirk Gamlin
- 1986: Dirk Gamlin
- 1987: Jörg Friess
- 1988: Volker Mai
- 1989: Dirk Gamlin
- 1990: Jörg Friess

=== Shot put ===
- 1960: Peter Gratz
- 1961: Rudolf Langer
- 1962: Peter Gratz
- 1963: Rudolf Langer
- 1964: Rudolf Langer
- 1965: Uwe Grabe
- 1966: Rudolf Langer
- 1967: Dieter Prollius
- 1968: Dieter Hoffmann
- 1969: Hans-Peter Gies
- 1970: Hartmut Briesenick
- 1971: Hartmut Briesenick
- 1972: Hans-Peter Gies
- 1973: Hartmut Briesenick
- 1974: Hartmut Briesenick
- 1975: Heinz-Joachim Rothenburg
- 1976: Hans-Peter Gies
- 1977: Udo Beyer
- 1978: Udo Beyer
- 1979: Udo Beyer
- 1980: Udo Beyer
- 1981: Udo Beyer
- 1982: Udo Beyer
- 1983: Udo Beyer
- 1984: Udo Beyer
- 1985: Udo Beyer
- 1986: Udo Beyer
- 1987: Udo Beyer
- 1988: Ulf Timmermann
- 1989: Ulf Timmermann
- 1990: Ulf Timmermann

=== Discus throw ===
- 1960: Fritz Kühl
- 1961: Lothar Milde
- 1962: Lothar Milde
- 1963: Lothar Milde
- 1964: Fritz Kühl
- 1965: Fritz Kühl
- 1966: Hartmut Losch
- 1967: Detlef Thorith
- 1968: Lothar Milde
- 1969: Lothar Milde
- 1970: Detlef Thorith
- 1971: Lothar Milde
- 1972: Detlef Thorith
- 1973: Siegfried Pachale
- 1974: Gunnar Müller
- 1975: Wolfgang Schmidt
- 1976: Wolfgang Schmidt
- 1977: Wolfgang Schmidt
- 1978: Wolfgang Schmidt
- 1979: Wolfgang Schmidt
- 1980: Wolfgang Schmidt
- 1981: Armin Lemme
- 1982: Armin Lemme
- 1983: Jürgen Schult
- 1984: Jürgen Schult
- 1985: Jürgen Schult
- 1986: Jürgen Schult
- 1987: Jürgen Schult
- 1988: Jürgen Schult
- 1989: Jürgen Schult
- 1990: Jürgen Schult

=== Hammer throw ===
- 1960: Klaus Peter
- 1961: Horst Niebisch
- 1962: Martin Lotz
- 1963: Martin Lotz
- 1964: Manfred Losch
- 1965: Martin Lotz
- 1966: Manfred Losch
- 1967: Manfred Losch
- 1968: Reinhard Theimer
- 1969: Reinhard Theimer
- 1970: Reinhard Theimer
- 1971: Jochen Sachse
- 1972: Jochen Sachse
- 1973: Reinhard Theimer
- 1974: Reinhard Theimer
- 1975: Jochen Sachse
- 1976: Jochen Sachse
- 1977: Karl-Heinz Beilig
- 1978: Roland Steuk
- 1979: Roland Steuk
- 1980: Roland Steuk
- 1981: Roland Steuk
- 1982: Roland Steuk
- 1983: Roland Steuk
- 1984: Ralf Haber
- 1985: Matthias Moder
- 1986: Günther Rodehau
- 1987: Ralf Haber
- 1988: Ralf Haber
- 1989: Ralf Haber
- 1990: Günther Rodehau

=== Javelin throw ===
- 1960: Walter Krüger
- 1961: Erich Ahrendt
- 1962: Wolfgang Frommhagen
- 1963: Horst Bade
- 1964: Horst Bade
- 1965: Manfred Stolle
- 1966: Horst Bade
- 1967: Manfred Stolle
- 1968: Manfred Stolle
- 1969: Manfred Stolle
- 1970: Manfred Stolle
- 1971: Manfred Stolle
- 1972: Manfred Stolle
- 1973: Manfred Stolle
- 1974: Manfred Ahlert
- 1975: Detlef Michel
- 1976: Wolfgang Hanisch
- 1977: Wolfgang Hanisch
- 1978: Wolfgang Hanisch
- 1979: Detlef Michel
- 1980: Detlef Michel
- 1981: Gerald Weiß
- 1982: Detlef Michel
- 1983: Detlef Michel
- 1984: Uwe Hohn
- 1985: Uwe Hohn
- 1986: Detlef Michel
- 1987: Detlef Michel
- 1988: Silvio Warsönke
- 1989: Volker Hadwich
- 1990: Raymond Hecht

=== Decathlon ===
- 1960: Wolfgang Utech
- 1961: Wolfgang Utech
- 1962: Gerhard Lohse
- 1963: Wolfgang Utech
- 1964: Wolfgang Utech
- 1965: Horst Mempel
- 1966: Rudolf Langer
- 1967: Max Klauß
- 1968: Herbert Wessel
- 1969: Rüdiger Demmig
- 1970: Rüdiger Demmig
- 1971: Herbert Wessel
- 1972: Stefan Schreyer
- 1973: Dieter Krüger
- 1974: Rainer Pottel
- 1975: Dieter Krüger
- 1976: Siegfried Stark
- 1977: Siegfried Stark
- 1978: Rainer Pottel
- 1979: Steffen Grumbt
- 1980: Dietmar Jentsch
- 1981: Rainer Pottel
- 1982: Torsten Voss
- 1983: Torsten Voss
- 1984: Uwe Freimuth
- 1985: Uwe Freimuth
- 1986: Uwe Freimuth
- 1987: Torsten Voss
- 1988: Uwe Freimuth
- 1989: René Günther
- 1990: Torsten Voss

=== 10,000 metres walk ===
- 1987: Axel Noack

=== 20 kilometres walk ===
The event was held on a track from 1970 to 1972 and in 1990

- 1960: Hans-Joachim Pathus
- 1961: Hans-Joachim Pathus
- 1962: Hans-Georg Reimann
- 1963: Hans-Joachim Pathus
- 1964: Hans-Georg Reimann
- 1965: Hans-Joachim Pathus
- 1966: Gerhard Sperling
- 1967: Hans-Georg Reimann
- 1968: Gerhard Sperling
- 1969: Gerhard Sperling
- 1970: Peter Frenkel
- 1971: Gerhard Sperling
- 1972: Peter Frenkel & Hans-Georg Reimann
- 1973: Karl-Heinz Stadtmüller
- 1974: Karl-Heinz Stadtmüller
- 1975: Hartwig Gauder
- 1976: Hartwig Gauder
- 1977: Werner Heyer
- 1978: Roland Wieser
- 1979: Fred Sparmann
- 1980: Karl-Heinz Stadtmüller
- 1981: Ralf Kowalsky
- 1982: Werner Heyer
- 1983: Ralf Kowalsky
- 1984: Ronald Weigel
- 1985: Hartwig Gauder
- 1986: Hartwig Gauder
- 1987: Axel Noack
- 1988: Ronald Weigel
- 1989: Ronald Weigel
- 1990: Axel Noack

=== 35 kilometres walk ===
- 1963: Burkhard Leuschke
- 1964: Christoph Höhne
- 1965: Christoph Höhne

=== 50 kilometres walk ===
- 1960: Max Weber
- 1961: Hannes Koch
- 1962: Helmut Wilke
- 1963: Christoph Höhne
- 1964: Christoph Höhne
- 1965: Christoph Höhne
- 1966: Peter Selzer
- 1967: Peter Selzer
- 1968: Christoph Höhne
- 1969: Christoph Höhne
- 1970: Christoph Höhne
- 1971: Christoph Höhne
- 1972: Karl-Heinz Stadtmüller
- 1973: Peter Selzer
- 1974: Winfried Skotnicki
- 1975: Olaf Pilarski
- 1976: Steffen Müller
- 1977: Ralf Knütter
- 1978: Karl-Heinz Stadtmüller
- 1979: Hartwig Gauder
- 1980: Hans-Jürgen Lange
- 1981: Uwe Dünkel
- 1982: Hartwig Gauder
- 1983: Ronald Weigel
- 1984: Axel Noack
- 1985: Ronald Weigel
- 1986: Hartwig Gauder
- 1987: Dietmar Meisch
- 1988: Ronald Weigel
- 1989: Bernd Gummelt

=== Cross country (long course) ===
From 1960 to 1974 the event was held in December of the previous year, but the winners were classed as the champion for the subsequent year.

- 1960: Hans Grodotzki
- 1961: Gerhard Hönicke
- 1962: Not held
- 1963: Friedrich Janke
- 1964: Siegfried Herrmann
- 1965: Klaus Böttger
- 1966: Siegfried Herrmann
- 1967: Jürgen Haase
- 1968: Jürgen Haase
- 1969: Jürgen Haase
- 1970: Stefan Künzel
- 1971: Manfred Kuschmann
- 1972: Jürgen Haase
- 1973: Ronald Schwert
- 1974: Karl-Heinz Leiteritz
- 1975: Frank Baumgartl
- 1976: Wilfried Scholz
- 1977: Hans-Henning Bräutigam
- 1978: Hans-Henning Bräutigam
- 1979: Lutz Obschonka
- 1980: Ralf Pönitzsch
- 1981: Werner Schildhauer
- 1982: Hansjörg Kunze
- 1983: Werner Schildhauer
- 1984: Werner Schildhauer
- 1985: Frank Heine
- 1986: Frank Heine
- 1987: Frank Heine
- 1988: Rainer Wachenbrunner
- 1989: Steffen Dittmann
- 1990: Rainer Wachenbrunner

=== Cross country (short course) ===
From 1960 to 1974 the event was held in December of the previous year, but were classed as the champion for the subsequent year.

- 1960: Siegfried Herrmann
- 1961: Siegfried Herrmann
- 1962: Not held
- 1963: Jürgen May
- 1964: Jürgen May
- 1965: Jürgen May
- 1966: Wolf-Dieter Holtz
- 1967: Dieter Hermann
- 1968: Bernd Dreke
- 1969: Frank Eisenberg
- 1970: Bernd Dießner
- 1971: Klaus-Peter Justus
- 1972: Jürgen Hemmerling
- 1973: Andreas/Horst? Lohmann
- 1974: Klaus-Dieter Schieminz
- 1975: Siegfried Arndt
- 1976: Olaf Beyer
- 1977: Helfried Tannert
- 1978: Werner Schildhauer
- 1979: Johannes Ehmcke
- 1980: Frank Baumgartl
- 1981: Lutz Zauber
- 1982: Olaf Beyer
- 1983: Lutz Zauber
- 1984: Olaf Beyer
- 1985: Olaf Beyer
- 1986: Steffen Matthes
- 1987: André Wessel
- 1988: Olaf Beyer
- 1989: Heiner Mebes
- 1990: Thomas Margott

== Women ==
=== 100 metres ===
- 1960: Gisela Birkemeyer
- 1961: Hannelore Räpke
- 1962: Hannelore Räpke
- 1963: Hannelore Räpke
- 1964: Heilwig Jakob
- 1965: Gundula Diel
- 1966: Ingrid Tiedtke
- 1967: Renate Heldt
- 1968: Angela Vogel
- 1969: Petra Kandarr
- 1970: Renate Stecher
- 1971: Renate Stecher
- 1972: Evelin Kaufer
- 1973: Renate Stecher
- 1974: Renate Stecher
- 1975: Renate Stecher
- 1976: Monika Hamann
- 1977: Marlies Göhr
- 1978: Marlies Göhr
- 1979: Marlies Göhr
- 1980: Marlies Göhr
- 1981: Marlies Göhr
- 1982: Marlies Göhr
- 1983: Marlies Göhr
- 1984: Marlies Göhr
- 1985: Marlies Göhr
- 1986: Silke Möller
- 1987: Silke Möller
- 1988: Marlies Göhr
- 1989: Katrin Krabbe
- 1990: Kerstin Behrendt

=== 200 metres ===
- 1960: Gisela Birkemeyer
- 1961: Hannelore Räpke
- 1962: Hannelore Räpke
- 1963: Hannelore Räpke
- 1964: Hannelore Räpke
- 1965: Gundula Diel
- 1966: Ingrid Tiedtke
- 1967: Ingrid Tiedtke
- 1968: Karin Balzer
- 1969: Petra Kandarr
- 1970: Renate Stecher
- 1971: Renate Stecher
- 1972: Christina Heinich
- 1973: Renate Stecher
- 1974: Renate Stecher
- 1975: Carla Bodendorf
- 1976: Bärbel Wöckel
- 1977: Bärbel Wöckel
- 1978: Marlies Göhr
- 1979: Marita Koch
- 1980: Bärbel Wöckel
- 1981: Bärbel Wöckel
- 1982: Marita Koch
- 1983: Marita Koch
- 1984: Marlies Göhr
- 1985: Marita Koch
- 1986: Heike Drechsler
- 1987: Silke Möller
- 1988: Heike Drechsler
- 1989: Silke Möller
- 1990: Katrin Krabbe

=== 400 metres ===
- 1960: Crista Wessler
- 1961: Bärbel Mayer
- 1962: Barbara Reinnagel
- 1963: Gertrude Schmidt
- 1964: Gertrude Schmidt
- 1965: Gertrude Schmidt
- 1966: Brigitte Flach
- 1967: Ingrid Zander
- 1968: Waltraud Dietsch
- 1969: Hannelore Middecke
- 1970: Monika Zehrt
- 1971: Helga Seidler
- 1972: Monika Zehrt
- 1973: Monika Zehrt
- 1974: Ellen Streidt
- 1975: Brigitte Rohde
- 1976: Brigitte Rohde
- 1977: Marita Koch
- 1978: Marita Koch
- 1979: Christina Lathan & Gabriele Löwe
- 1980: Marita Koch
- 1981: Marita Koch
- 1982: Dagmar Neubauer
- 1983: Sabine Busch
- 1984: Marita Koch
- 1985: Kirsten Emmelmann
- 1986: Petra Schersing
- 1987: Petra Schersing
- 1988: Petra Schersing
- 1989: Grit Breuer
- 1990: Grit Breuer

=== 800 metres ===
- 1960: Ursula Donath
- 1961: Ilse Schönemann
- 1962: Waltraud Strotzer
- 1963: Waltraud Strotzer
- 1964: Waltraud Strotzer
- 1965: Hannelore Suppe
- 1966: Waltraud Strotzer
- 1967: Regine Kleinau
- 1968: Karin Krebs
- 1969: Barbara Wieck
- 1970: Gunhild Hoffmeister
- 1971: Gunhild Hoffmeister
- 1972: Gunhild Hoffmeister
- 1973: Gunhild Hoffmeister
- 1974: Gunhild Hoffmeister
- 1975: Christina Neumann
- 1976: Gunhild Hoffmeister
- 1977: Christina Liebetrau
- 1978: Anita Weiß
- 1979: Anita Weiß
- 1980: Hildegard Körner
- 1981: Martina Steuk
- 1982: Martina Steuk
- 1983: Christine Wachtel
- 1984: Hildegard Körner
- 1985: Christine Wachtel
- 1986: Sigrun Wodars
- 1987: Christine Wachtel
- 1988: Christine Wachtel
- 1989: Sigrun Wodars
- 1990: Sigrun Wodars

=== 1500 metres ===
- 1967: Waltraud Strotzer
- 1968: Gunhild Hoffmeister
- 1969: Gunhild Hoffmeister
- 1970: Gunhild Hoffmeister
- 1971: Gunhild Hoffmeister
- 1972: Gunhild Hoffmeister
- 1973: Gunhild Hoffmeister
- 1974: Gunhild Hoffmeister
- 1975: Waltraud Strotzer
- 1976: Gunhild Hoffmeister
- 1977: Christina Liebetrau
- 1978: Ulrike Bruns
- 1979: Christiane Wartenberg
- 1980: Christiane Wartenberg
- 1981: Angelika Zauber
- 1982: Ulrike Bruns
- 1983: Christiane Wartenberg
- 1984: Ulrike Bruns
- 1985: Ulrike Bruns
- 1986: Ines Bibernell
- 1987: Hildegard Körner
- 1988: Birgit Barth
- 1989: Ellen Kiessling
- 1990: Ellen Kiessling

=== 3000 metres ===
- 1976: Ulrike Bruns
- 1977: Gabriele Meinel
- 1978: Gabriele Meinel
- 1979: Petra Sabban
- 1980: Katrin Dörre-Heinig
- 1981: Ulrike Bruns
- 1982: Ulrike Bruns
- 1983: Gabriele Meinel
- 1984: Ulrike Bruns
- 1985: Ines Bibernell
- 1986: Ines Bibernell
- 1987: Kathrin Weßel
- 1988: Kathrin Weßel
- 1989: Kathrin Weßel
- 1990: Kathrin Weßel

=== 10,000 metres ===
- 1985: Ines Bibernell
- 1986: Ulrike Bruns
- 1987: Kathrin Weßel
- 1988: Kathrin Weßel
- 1989: Kathrin Weßel
- 1990: Kathrin Weßel

=== Marathon ===
- 1982: Katrin Dörre-Heinig
- 1983: Gabriele Meinel
- 1984: Ute Möckel
- 1985: Birgit Weinhold
- 1986: Uta Pippig
- 1987: Uta Pippig
- 1988: Andrea Fleischer
- 1989: Annette Fincke
- 1990: Andrea Fleischer

=== 80 metres hurdles ===
- 1960: Gisela Birkemeyer
- 1961: Gisela Birkemeyer
- 1962: Karin Balzer
- 1963: Karin Balzer
- 1964: Gundula Diel
- 1965: Gundula Diel
- 1966: Karin Balzer
- 1967: Karin Balzer
- 1968: Karin Balzer

=== 100 metres hurdles ===
- 1967: Inge Köppen
- 1968: Petra Gloger
- 1969: Karin Balzer
- 1970: Annelie Jahns
- 1971: Karin Balzer
- 1972: Annelie Ehrhardt
- 1973: Annelie Ehrhardt
- 1974: Annelie Ehrhardt
- 1975: Annerose Fiedler
- 1976: Johanna Klier
- 1977: Johanna Klier
- 1978: Johanna Klier
- 1979: Kerstin Knabe
- 1980: Johanna Klier
- 1981: Kerstin Knabe
- 1982: Bettine Jahn
- 1983: Bettine Jahn
- 1984: Cornelia Oschkenat
- 1985: Cornelia Oschkenat
- 1986: Cornelia Oschkenat
- 1987: Gloria Siebert
- 1988: Cornelia Oschkenat
- 1989: Cornelia Oschkenat
- 1990: Gloria Siebert

=== 200 metres hurdles ===
- 1970: Annelie Jahns

=== 400 metres hurdles ===
In 1977 a women's 400 m hurdles was held, but did not yet have official championship status.

- 1977: Karin Roßley
- 1978: Anita Weiß
- 1979: Bärbel Broschat
- 1980: Petra Pfaff
- 1981: Ellen Fiedler
- 1982: Ellen Fiedler
- 1983: Ellen Fiedler
- 1984: Birgit Uibel
- 1985: Sabine Busch
- 1986: Sabine Busch
- 1987: Sabine Busch
- 1988: Sabine Busch
- 1989: Petra Krug
- 1990: Heike Meißner

=== High jump ===
- 1960: Doris Langer
- 1961: Renate Feige
- 1962: Doris Langer
- 1963: Doris Langer
- 1964: Gerda Kupferschmidt
- 1965: Rita Gildemeister
- 1966: Bärbel Graf
- 1967: Rita Kirst
- 1968: Rita Kirst
- 1969: Rita Kirst
- 1970: Rita Kirst
- 1971: Rita Kirst
- 1972: Rita Kirst
- 1973: Rosemarie Ackermann
- 1974: Rosemarie Ackermann
- 1975: Rita Kirst
- 1976: Rosemarie Ackermann
- 1977: Rosemarie Ackermann
- 1978: Jutta Kirst
- 1979: Rosemarie Ackermann
- 1980: Rosemarie Ackermann
- 1981: Andrea Reichstein
- 1982: Andrea Reichstein
- 1983: Susanne Beyer
- 1984: Andrea Reichstein
- 1985: Susanne Beyer
- 1986: Andrea Reichstein
- 1987: Susanne Beyer
- 1988: Gabriele Günz
- 1989: Heike Balck
- 1990: Heike Balck

=== Long jump ===
- 1960: Hildrun Laufer-Claus
- 1961: Hildrun Laufer-Claus
- 1962: Hildrun Laufer-Claus
- 1963: Karin Balzer
- 1964: Hildrun Laufer
- 1965: Inge Bauer
- 1966: Burghild Wieczorek
- 1967: Bärbel Löhnert
- 1968: Bärbel Löhnert
- 1969: Kristina Hauer
- 1970: Margrit Olfert
- 1971: Margrit Olfert
- 1972: Angelika Liebsch
- 1973: Angela Voigt
- 1974: Marianne Voelzke
- 1975: Angela Voigt
- 1976: Angela Voigt
- 1977: Brigitte Wujak
- 1978: Angela Voigt
- 1979: Angela Voigt
- 1980: Siegrun Siegl
- 1981: Heike Drechsler
- 1982: Ramona Neubert
- 1983: Heike Drechsler
- 1984: Heike Drechsler
- 1985: Heike Drechsler
- 1986: Heike Drechsler
- 1987: Heike Drechsler
- 1988: Heike Drechsler
- 1989: Helga Radtke
- 1990: Heike Drechsler

=== Shot put ===
- 1960: Johanna Lüttge
- 1961: Renate Boy
- 1962: Renate Boy
- 1963: Renate Boy
- 1964: Renate Boy
- 1965: Renate Boy
- 1966: Margitta Gummel
- 1967: Renate Boy
- 1968: Margitta Gummel
- 1969: Margitta Gummel
- 1970: Marita Lange
- 1971: Margitta Gummel
- 1972: Margitta Gummel
- 1973: Marita Lange
- 1974: Marianne Adam
- 1975: Marianne Adam
- 1976: Marianne Adam
- 1977: Ilona Slupianek
- 1978: Margitta Pufe
- 1979: Ilona Slupianek
- 1980: Ilona Slupianek
- 1981: Ilona Slupianek
- 1982: Ilona Slupianek
- 1983: Ilona Slupianek
- 1984: Ilona Slupianek
- 1985: Ines Müller
- 1986: Ines Müller
- 1987: Heike Hartwig
- 1988: Kathrin Neimke
- 1989: Heike Hartwig
- 1990: Heike Hartwig

=== Discus throw ===
- 1960: Doris Lorenz-Müller
- 1961: Doris Lorenz-Müller
- 1962: Ingrid Lotz
- 1963: Ingrid Lotz
- 1964: Ingrid Lotz
- 1965: Anita Otto
- 1966: Anita Otto
- 1967: Karin Illgen
- 1968: Karin Illgen
- 1969: Gabriele Hinzmann
- 1970: Anna Mickler
- 1971: Karin Illgen
- 1972: Gabriele Hinzmann
- 1973: Gabriele Hinzmann
- 1974: Gabriele Hinzmann
- 1975: Sabine Engel
- 1976: Evelin Jahl
- 1977: Evelin Jahl
- 1978: Evelin Jahl
- 1979: Evelin Jahl
- 1980: Evelin Jahl
- 1981: Evelin Jahl
- 1982: Irina Meszynski
- 1983: Gisela Beyer
- 1984: Gisela Beyer
- 1985: Martina Hellmann
- 1986: Martina Hellmann
- 1987: Martina Hellmann
- 1988: Diana Gansky
- 1989: Ilke Wyludda
- 1990: Ilke Wyludda

=== Javelin throw ===
- 1960: Crista Ranke
- 1961: Crista Ranke
- 1962: Marion Lüttge
- 1963: Marion Lüttge
- 1964: Inga Schwalbe
- 1965: Helga Schulze
- 1966: Marion Lüttge
- 1967: Ruth Fuchs
- 1968: Helga Schulze
- 1969: Helga Börner
- 1970: Ruth Fuchs
- 1971: Ruth Fuchs
- 1972: Ruth Fuchs
- 1973: Ruth Fuchs
- 1974: Jacqueline Todten
- 1975: Ruth Fuchs
- 1976: Ruth Fuchs
- 1977: Ruth Fuchs
- 1978: Ruth Fuchs
- 1979: Ruth Fuchs
- 1980: Ruth Fuchs
- 1981: Rositha Potreck
- 1982: Ute Richter
- 1983: Antje Zöllkau
- 1984: Petra Felke
- 1985: Petra Felke
- 1986: Petra Felke
- 1987: Petra Felke
- 1988: Petra Felke
- 1989: Petra Felke
- 1990: Karen Forkel

=== Pentathlon ===
- 1960: Christa Gutsche
- 1961: Christa Gutsche
- 1962: Karin Balzer
- 1963: Karin Balzer
- 1964: Inge Bauer
- 1965: Inge Bauer
- 1966: Gerda Uhlemann
- 1967: Bärbel Löhnert
- 1968: Bärbel Löhnert
- 1969: Burglinde Pollak
- 1970: Burglinde Pollak
- 1971: Margrit Olfert
- 1972: Christine Bodner
- 1973: Burglinde Pollak
- 1974: Burglinde Pollak
- 1975: Siegrun Siegl
- 1976: Petra Rampf
- 1977: Petra Rampf
- 1978: Petra Steinbrück
- 1979: Burglinde Pollak

=== Heptathlon ===
- 1980: Anke Behmer
- 1981: Ramona Neubert
- 1982: Anke Behmer
- 1983: Anke Behmer
- 1984: Sabine John
- 1985: Sibylle Thiele
- 1986: Anke Behmer
- 1987: Anke Behmer
- 1988: Heike Tischler
- 1989: Birgit Gautzsch
- 1990: Heike Tischler

=== 3000 metres walk ===
- 1984: Doris Kampa

=== 5000 metres walk ===
- 1990: Beate Gummelt

=== 10 kilometres walk ===
- 1985: Ula Klaedtke
- 1986: Ines Estedt
- 1987: Beate Gummelt
- 1988: Beate Gummelt
- 1989: Beate Gummelt

=== Cross country (long course) ===
- 1986: Gabriele Meinel
- 1987: Kathrin Weßel
- 1988: Kristina Garlipp
- 1989: Kathrin Weßel
- 1990: Kathrin Weßel∂

=== Cross country (short course) ===
From 1960 to 1974 the event was held in December of the previous year, but the winners were classed as the champion for the subsequent year.

- 1960: Ursula Donath
- 1961: Gisela Breier
- 1962: Not held
- 1963: Annemarie Hübner
- 1964: Annemarie Hübner
- 1965: Annemarie Hübner
- 1966: Irene Hansen
- 1967: Waltraud Strotzer
- 1968: Karin Krebs
- 1969: Gertrude Schmidt
- 1970: Katharina Clausnitzer
- 1971: Gunhild Hoffmeister
- 1972: Iris Claus
- 1973: Heidrun Schröder
- 1974: Waltraud Strotzer
- 1975: Katja Hermann
- 1976: Ulrike Bruns
- 1977: Ulrike Bruns
- 1978: Gabriele Meinel
- 1979: Ulla Sauer
- 1980: Anita Weiß
- 1981: Ulrike Bruns
- 1982: Beate Liebich
- 1983: Gabriele Meinel
- 1984: Ulrike Bruns
- 1985: Jeanette Hain
- 1986: Yvonne Grabner
- 1987: Sabine Leist
- 1988: Andrea Fleischer
- 1989: Katrin Kowalski
- 1990: Hildegard Körner
