= Georg Ackermann (athlete) =

German long jumper

Personal information
- Born: 13 July 1972 (age 54) Gernsbach, Baden-Württemberg, Germany

Sport
- Sport: Track and field
Medal record
Representing Germany
Summer Universiade
| Silver medal – second place | 1995 Fukuoka | Long jump |

Georg Ackermann (born 13 July 1972) is a retired German long jumper.

He won a bronze medal at the 1991 European Junior Championships, finished fourth at the 1995 World Championships and won a silver medal at the 1995 Summer Universiade with a personal best of 8.21 metres. Furthermore, he was a member of the German Olympic Team in Atlanta 1996. He represented the sports clubs LG Karlsruhe and TV Heppenheim, and became German champion in 1993 and 1995.

His personal best jump of 8.21 metres ranks him tenth among German long jumpers, behind Lutz Dombrowski, Frank Paschek, Josef Schwarz, Henry Lauterbach, Marco Delonge, Konstantin Krause, Dietmar Haaf, Ron Beer and Uwe Lange, and equal to Nils Winter and Christian Thomas.
