= Nils Winter =

German long jumper (born 1977)

Medal record

Representing Germany

Men's athletics

European Indoor Championships
Silver medal – second place	2009 Turin	Long Jump

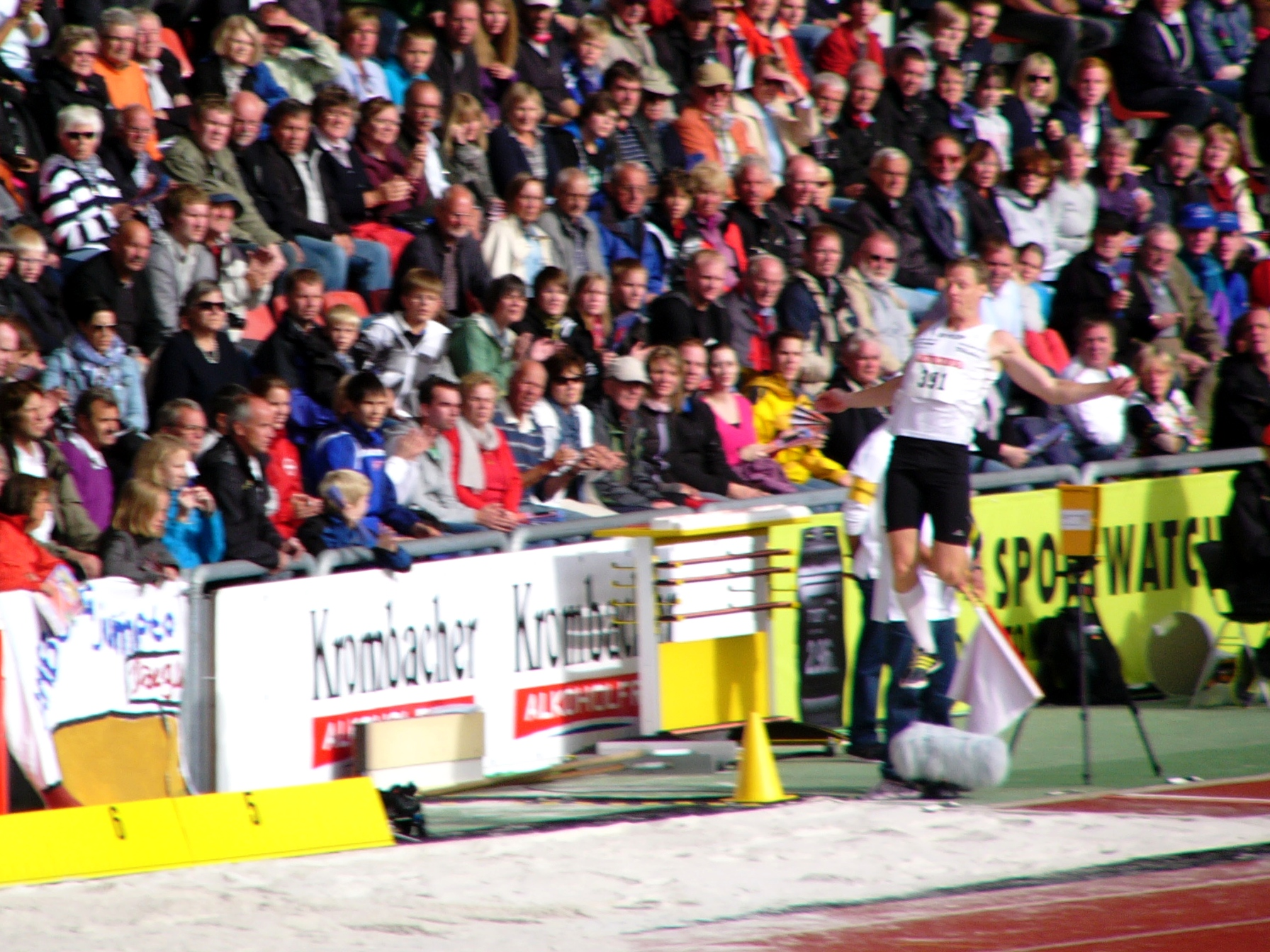
Nils Winter at the 2011 German Athletics Championships

Nils Winter (born 27 March 1977 in Buxtehude) is a German long jumper.

He finished seventh at the 2005 European Indoor Athletics Championships and the 2007 European Indoor Athletics Championships. Before this he had competed at the 2003 World Championships, 2004 World Indoor Championships and the 2004 Summer Olympics without reaching the finals.

His personal best jump is 8.21 metres, achieved in June 2005 in Bad Langensalza. This ranks him tenth among German long jumpers, behind Lutz Dombrowski, Frank Paschek, Josef Schwarz, Henry Lauterbach, Marco Delonge, Konstantin Krause, Dietmar Haaf, Ron Beer and Uwe Lange, and equal to Georg Ackermann and Christian Thomas.

== Competition record ==
Year	Competition	Venue	Position	Notes
Representing Germany
2003	World Championships	Paris, France	21st (q)	7.80 m
2004	World Indoor Championships	Budapest, Hungary	10th (q)	7.95 m
2004	Olympic Games	Athens, Greece	31st (q)	7.51 m
2005	European Indoor Championships	Madrid, Spain	7th	7.80 m
2005	World Championships	Helsinki, Finland	12th	7.72 m
2005	Universiade	İzmir, Turkey	16th (q)	7.41 m
2007	European Indoor Championships	Birmingham, United Kingdom	7th	7.88 m
2009	European Indoor Championships	Turin, Italy	2nd	8.22 m
2009	World Championships	Berlin, Germany	34th (q)	7.69 m
2011	European Indoor Championships	Paris, France	19th (q)	7.61 m
2012	European Championships	Helsinki, Finland	22nd (q)	7.71 m
