= Christian Thomas (long jumper) =

German long jumper

Personal information
- Born: 31 March 1965 (age 61)

Sport
- Sport: Track and field
Medal record
Representing West Germany
European Indoor Championships
Bronze medal – third place	1987 Lievin	Long jump

Christian Thomas (born 31 March 1965) is a retired West German long jumper.

Thomas represented the sports club TV Heppenheim. His personal best jump was 8.21 metres, achieved in July 1994 in Germering. This ranks him tenth among German long jumpers, behind Lutz Dombrowski, Frank Paschek, Josef Schwarz, Henry Lauterbach, Marco Delonge, Konstantin Krause, Dietmar Haaf, Ron Beer and Uwe Lange, and equal to Georg Ackermann and Nils Winter.

== Achievements ==
Year	Competition	Venue	Position	Notes
Representing West Germany
1987	World Indoor Championships	Indianapolis, United States	15th	7.48 m
1987	European Indoor Championships	Liévin, France	3rd	8.12 m
1989	European Indoor Championships	The Hague, Netherlands	9th	7.75 m
1990	European Indoor Championships	Glasgow, Scotland	4th	7.88 m
1990	European Championships	Split, Yugoslavia	12th	7.74 m (wind: 0.0 m/s)
Representing Germany
1994	European Championships	Helsinki, Finland	20th (q)	7.66 m (wind: +0.5 m/s)
