= Athletics at the 1959 World Festival of Youth and Students =

The 7th World Festival of Youth and Students featured an athletics competition among its programme of events. The events were contested in Vienna, Austria on 30 and 31 July 1959. Mainly contested among Eastern European athletes, it served as an alternative to the more Western European-oriented 1959 Universiade held in Turin the same year.

Four reigning men's champions from the 1958 European Athletics Championships were present at the competition: high jumper Richard Dahl, long jumper Igor Ter-Ovanesyan, javelin thrower Janusz Sidło and discus thrower Edmund Piątkowski (the latter a world record holder at the time). Sidło's fifth win in Union Internationale des Étudiants (UIE) competition made him the most successful individual athlete of the competition's history.

In the women's competition, Vera Krepkina did a 100 metres/long jump double and she became Olympic champion in the latter event a year later. The emerging Tamara Press dominated the shot put and discus throw (a year later she became an Olympic champion in both disciplines). Iolanda Balaș, reigning European champion at the time, retained her high jump title for a fourth straight UIE win.

== Medal summary ==
=== Men ===
Event	Gold		Silver		Bronze	
100 metres	Jerzy Juskowiak (POL)	10.5	Edvin Ozolin (URS)	10.6	Reinhard Seidler (GDR)	10.7
200 metres	Jerzy Kowalski (POL)	21.4	Vilém Mandlík (TCH)	21.5	Edvin Ozolin (URS)	21.5
400 metres	Jerzy Kowalski (POL)	48.2	Jaroslav Jirásek (TCH)	48.5	Vilém Mandlík (TCH)	48.9
800 metres	Siegfried Valentin (GDR)	1:49.3	Traian Sudrigean (ROM)	1:51.0	Ingemar Hägglund (SWE)	1:52.9
1500 metres	Siegfried Valentin (GDR)	3:49.4	Witold Baran (POL)	3:51.1	Hans Grodotzki (GDR)	3:54.0
5000 metres	Friedrich Janke (GDR)	14:12.6	Aleksandr Artinyuk (URS)	14:13.2	Osvaldo Suárez (ARG)	14:14.4
110 m hurdles	Anatoliy Mikhailov (URS)	14.4	Ivan Veselský (TCH)	15.3	Georgi Kaburov (BUL)	15.5
400 m hurdles	Hans Dittner (GDR)	53.4	Ingvar Carlsson (SWE)	53.9	Elio Catola (ITA)	54.1
High jump	Igor Kashkarov (URS)	2.09 m	Jiří Lanský (TCH)	2.03 m	Richard Dahl (SWE)	2.00 m
Pole vault	Gerhard Jeitner (GDR)	4.30 m	Ihor Petrenko (URS)	4.20 m	Peter Laufer (GDR)	4.20 m
Long jump	Igor Ter-Ovanesyan (URS)	7.61 m	Branko Miler (YUG)	7.02 m	Peter Becher (GDR)	6.90 m
Triple jump	Oleg Ryakhovskiy (URS)	15.21 m	Y. Sidorov (URS)	14.82 m	Karl Thierfelder (GDR)	14.57 m
Shot put	Fritz Kühl (GDR)	16.12 m	Dako Radošević (YUG)	15.62 m	Manfred Grieser (GDR)	15.12 m
Discus throw	Edmund Piątkowski (POL)	57.87 m	Manfred Grieser (GDR)	54.60 m	Fritz Kühl (GDR)	52.54 m
Hammer throw	Heinrich Thun (AUT)	61.23 m	Olgierd Ciepły (POL)	60.70 m	Imre Trényi (HUN)	58.95 m
Javelin throw	Janusz Sidło (POL)	76.53 m	Vladimir Kuznetsov (URS)	75.08 m	Alexandru Bizim (ROM)	74.27 m

=== Women ===
Event	Gold		Silver		Bronze	
100 metres	Vera Krepkina (URS)	11.7	Gisela Birkemeyer (GDR)	11.9	Olga Šikovec (YUG)	12.2
200 metres	Lyudmila Ignatyeva (URS)	24.4	Gisela Birkemeyer (GDR)	24.5	Antónia Munkácsi (HUN)	24.6
400 metres	Maria Bienia (POL)	58.5	Bedriška Kulhavá (TCH)	58.8	Antónia Munkácsi (HUN)	60.0
80 m hurdles	Gisela Birkemeyer (GDR)	10.9	Alena Stolzová (TCH)	11.3	Draga Stamejcic (YUG)	11.4
High jump	Iolanda Balaș (ROM)	1.75 m	Taisiya Chenchik (URS)	1.70 m	Margarita Fatyanova (URS)	1.55 m
Long jump	Vera Krepkina (URS)	6.12 m	Teresa Wieczorek (POL)	5.98 m	Hildrun Claus (GDR)	5.75 m
Shot put	Tamara Press (URS)	16.65 m	Johanna Lüttge (GDR)	15.25 m	Judit Bognár (HUN)	15.09 m
Discus throw	Tamara Press (URS)	55.80 m	Štepánka Mertová (TCH)	51.20 m	Irene Schuch (GDR)	50.75 m
Javelin throw	Alevtina Shastikova (URS)	54.33 m	Dana Zátopková (TCH)	54.09 m	Biruté Zalogaitité (URS)	52.25 m

== Medal table ==
Rank	Nation	Gold	Silver	Bronze	Total
1	Soviet Union (URS)	10	6	3	19
2	East Germany (GDR)	7	4	9	20
3	Poland (POL)	6	3	0	9
4	Romania (ROM)	1	1	1	3
5	Austria (AUT)	1	0	0	1
6	Czechoslovakia (TCH)	0	8	1	9
7	Yugoslavia (YUG)	0	2	2	4
8	Sweden (SWE)	0	1	2	3
9	Hungary (HUN)	0	0	4	4
10	Argentina (ARG)	0	0	1	1
10	Bulgaria (BUL)	0	0	1	1
10	Italy (ITA)	0	0	1	1
Totals (12 entries)		25	25	25	75

== See also ==
- FISU World University Games § Precursors
- University and college sport
