= 1966 European Athletics Championships – Men's hammer throw =

Field event

Men's hammer throw at the European Athletics Championships

The men's hammer throw at the 1966 European Athletics Championships was held in Budapest, Hungary, at Népstadion on 3 and 4 September 1966.

== Medalists ==
Gold	Romuald Klim; Soviet Union
Silver	Gyula Zsivótzky; Hungary
Bronze	Uwe Beyer; West Germany

== Results ==
=== Final ===
4 September

Rank	Name	Nationality	Result	Notes
1st place, gold medalist(s)	Romuald Klim	Soviet Union	70.02	CR
2nd place, silver medalist(s)	Gyula Zsivótzky	Hungary	68.62	
3rd place, bronze medalist(s)	Uwe Beyer	West Germany	67.28	
4	Manfred Losch	East Germany	65.84	
5	Vladimir Tribunskiy	Soviet Union	65.28	
6	Lázár Lovász	Hungary	65.28	
7	Sándor Eckschmiedt	Hungary	64.52	
8	Martin Lotz	East Germany	63.16	
9	Hans Fahsl	West Germany	63.00	
10	Gheorghe Costache	Romania	62.60	
11	Gennadiy Kondrashov	Soviet Union	62.38	
	Ernst Ammann	Switzerland	NM	

=== Qualification ===
3 September

Rank	Name	Nationality	Result	Notes
1	Gyula Zsivótzky	Hungary	68.40	Q
2	Uwe Beyer	West Germany	67.00	Q
3	Romuald Klim	Soviet Union	66.82	Q
4	Ernst Ammann	Switzerland	65.70	NR Q
5	Gheorghe Costache	Romania	64.88	Q
6	Hans Fahsl	West Germany	64.28	Q
7	Gennadiy Kondrashov	Soviet Union	64.20	Q
8	Lázár Lovász	Hungary	64.04	Q
9	Sándor Eckschmiedt	Hungary	63.90	Q
10	Manfred Losch	East Germany	63.20	Q
11	Martin Lotz	East Germany	62.02	Q
12	Vladimir Tribunskiy	Soviet Union	61.78	Q
13	Tadeusz Rut	Poland	61.26	
14	John Lawlor	Ireland	57.08	
15	Frangiskos Politis	Greece	55.18	
16	Marcel Hertogs	Belgium	52.36	
17	Kujtim Shehu	Albania	50.70	

== Participation ==
According to an unofficial count, 17 athletes from 10 countries participated in the event.

- Albania (1)
- Belgium (1)
- East Germany (2)
- Greece (1)
- Hungary (4)
- Ireland (1)
- Poland (1)
- Soviet Union (3)
- Switzerland (1)
- West Germany (2)
