= 1962 European Athletics Championships – Men's hammer throw =

Men's hammer throw at the European Athletics Championships

The men's hammer throw at the 1962 European Athletics Championships was held in Belgrade, then Yugoslavia, at JNA Stadium on 15 and 16 September 1962.

== Medalists ==
Gold	Gyula Zsivótzky; Hungary
Silver	Aleksey Baltovskiy; Soviet Union
Bronze	Yuriy Bakarinov; Soviet Union

== Results ==
=== Final ===
16 September

Rank	Name	Nationality	Result	Notes
1st place, gold medalist(s)	Gyula Zsivótzky	Hungary	69.64	AR
2nd place, silver medalist(s)	Aleksey Baltovskiy	Soviet Union	66.93	
3rd place, bronze medalist(s)	Yuriy Bakarinov	Soviet Union	66.57	
4	Heinrich Thun	Austria	65.23	
5	Olgierd Ciepły	Poland	64.34	
6	Vasily Rudenkov	Soviet Union	63.94	
7	Josef Matoušek	Czechoslovakia	63.52	
8	Tadeusz Rut	Poland	62.95	
9	Hans Fahsl	West Germany	62.30	
10	Manfred Losch	East Germany	62.09	
11	Sándor Eckschmiedt	Hungary	60.64	
12	Martin Lotz	East Germany	58.84	

=== Qualification ===
15 September

Rank	Name	Nationality	Result	Notes
1	Gyula Zsivótzky	Hungary	66.17	CR Q
2	Yuriy Bakarinov	Soviet Union	64.49	Q
3	Sándor Eckschmiedt	Hungary	63.35	Q
4	Heinrich Thun	Austria	63.02	Q
5	Aleksey Baltovskiy	Soviet Union	62.92	Q
6	Martin Lotz	East Germany	62.39	Q
7	Vasily Rudenkov	Soviet Union	62.34	Q
8	Josef Matoušek	Czechoslovakia	62.34	Q
9	Olgierd Ciepły	Poland	62.27	Q
10	Manfred Losch	East Germany	62.24	Q
11	Hans Fahsl	West Germany	62.10	Q
12	Tadeusz Rut	Poland	61.94	Q
13	Sverre Strandli	Norway	61.78	
14	Kalevi Horppu	Finland	60.99	
15	Vasil Krumov	Bulgaria	60.71	
16	Birger Asplund	Sweden	60.15	
17	Zvonko Bezjak	Yugoslavia	59.79	
18	Rajmund Niwiński	Poland	59.53	
19	Josef Málek	Czechoslovakia	59.15	
20	Hansruedi Jost	Switzerland	57.95	

== Participation ==
According to an unofficial count, 20 athletes from 13 countries participated in the event.

- Austria (1)
- Bulgaria (1)
- Czechoslovakia (2)
- East Germany (2)
- Finland (1)
- Hungary (2)
- Norway (1)
- Poland (3)
- Soviet Union (3)
- Sweden (1)
- Switzerland (1)
- West Germany (1)
- Yugoslavia (1)
