= Lotz =

Lotz is a German surname. Notable people with the surname include:

- Anne Graham Lotz (born 1948), American evangelist
- Amanda D. Lotz, American educator and scholar
- Caity Lotz (born 1986), American actress
- Christian Lotz (born 1970), German-American philosopher
- Denton Lotz (1939–2019), American pastor
- Deon Lotz (born 1964), South African actor
- Dick Lotz (born 1942), American golfer
- Gernot Lotz (born 1967), German architect
- Hans Lotz (1947–2021), Australian hammer thrower
- Heinrich Lotz (1905–1982), German engineer
- Ingrid Lotz (born 1934), German discus thrower
- Irmgard Flügge-Lotz (1903–1974), German mathematician and engineer
- Jack Lotz (1933–2020), American wrestling referee
- Joe Lotz (1891–1971), American baseball player
- John Lotz (1935–2001), American basketball player and coach
- John N. Lotz, American general
- Károly Lotz (1833–1904), German-Hungarian painter
- Kurt Lotz (1912–2005), German business executive
- Marc Lotz (born 1973), Dutch cyclist
- Martin Lotz (born 1938), German hammer thrower
- Matilda Lotz (1858–1923), American painter
- René Lotz (born 1938), Dutch cyclist
- Ron M. Lotz, American pastor
- Sarah Lotz, British novelist and screenwriter
- Ute Lotz-Heumann (born 1966), German-American historian
- Wolfgang Lotz (1921–1993), Israeli spy

== See also ==
- Brissonneau and Lotz, French locomotive manufacturer
- Lotz Cisterns, an archaeological site in Negev Mountains, Israel
