= Ron Beer =

German long jumper

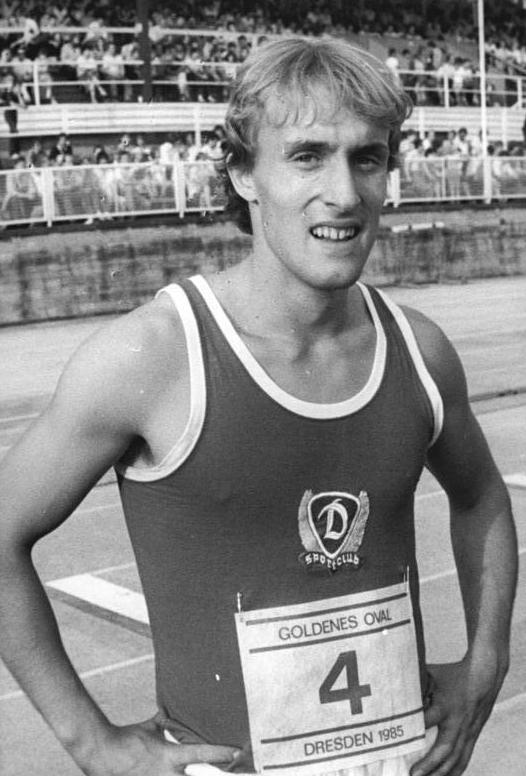
Ron Beer in 1985.

Ron Beer (born 29 August 1965) is a retired East German long jumper.

He won the gold medal at the 1983 European Junior Championships and finished seventh at the 1987 European Indoor Championships. He represented the sports club SC Dynamo Berlin, and became East German champion in 1986 and 1988.

His personal best jump is 8.23 meters, achieved in July 1988 in East Berlin. This ranks him eighth among German long jumpers, behind Lutz Dombrowski, Frank Paschek, Josef Schwarz, Henry Lauterbach, Marco Delonge, Konstantin Krause and Dietmar Haaf.
