= Athletics at the 1961 Summer Universiade – Men's hammer throw =

The men's hammer throw event at the 1961 Summer Universiade was held at the Vasil Levski National Stadium in Sofia, Bulgaria, in September 1961.

== Results ==
Rank	Athlete	Nationality	Result	Notes
1st place, gold medalist(s)	Gyula Zsivótzky	Hungary	64.62	
2nd place, silver medalist(s)	Gennadiy Kondrashov	Soviet Union	63.38	
3rd place, bronze medalist(s)	John Lawlor	Ireland	63.33	
4	Sándor Eckschmiedt	Hungary	60.95	
5	Olgierd Ciepły	Poland	60.59	
6	Takeo Sugawara	Japan	60.46	
7	Valcho Ivanov	Bulgaria	57.97	
8	Vasil Vasilev	Bulgaria	57.95	
9	Warwick Dixon	Great Britain	57.70	
10	Manlio Cristin	Italy	56.51	
11	Shohei Kasahara	Japan	55.44	
