= Kasahara (surname) =

Kasahara (written: 笠原 lit. "bamboo-hat meadow") is a Japanese surname. Notable people with the surname include:

- Erika Kasahara (born 1990), Japanese taekwondo practitioner
- Hiroko Kasahara (born 1970), Japanese voice actress and J-pop singer
- Kazuo Kasahara (1927–2002), Japanese screenwriter
- Kenji Kasahara (born 1975), Japanese entrepreneur
- Kasahara Kenju (1852–1883), Japanese Buddhologist and Indologist
- Kunihiko Kasahara (born 1941), Japanese origami master
- Momona Kasahara (born 2003), Japanese pop singer
- Rumi Kasahara (born 1970), Japanese voice actress
- Shigeru Kasahara (born 1933), Japanese wrestler
- Shohei Kasahara (笠原 章平, born 1939), Japanese hammer thrower
- Shoki Kasahara (born 1991), Japanese baseball player
- Shotaro Kasahara (born 1995), Japanese baseball player
- Sunao Kasahara (born 1989), Japanese football player
- Takashi Kasahara (footballer, born 1918), Japanese football player
- Takashi Kasahara (footballer, born 1988), Japanese football player goalkeeper
- Tokushi Kasahara (born 1944), Japanese historian
- Yōko Kasahara (born 1939), Japanese volleyball player
- Yukio Kasahara (1889–1988), leading general in the Imperial Japanese Army
- Yuri Kasahara, Japanese opera singer
