= Axel Weber =

Axel Weber may refer to:

- Axel Weber (athlete) (1954–2001), German pole vaulter
- Axel A. Weber (born 1957), German economist, professor and banker
