= Konstantin Krause =

German long jumper

Personal information
- Born: 8 October 1967 (age 59) Bad Langensalza, West Germany

Sport
- Sport: Track and field
Medal record
Representing Germany
European Indoor Championships
Silver medal – second place	1992 Genoa	Long jump

Konstantin Krause (born 8 October 1967) is a retired German long jumper.

He won the silver medal at the 1992 European Indoor Championships. He represented the sports clubs TV Wattenscheid, TV Heppenheim and LG Ohra/Hörsel, and became German champion in 1998 and 1999.

His personal best jump is 8.27 metres, achieved in June 1997 in Bad Langensalza. This ranks him fifth among German long jumpers, behind Lutz Dombrowski, Frank Paschek, Josef Schwarz and Henry Lauterbach and equal to Marco Delonge.
