= Kasahara =

Kasahara may refer to:

- Kasahara (surname)
- Kasahara, Gifu, a former town in Gifu Prefecture, Japan
- Sakai–Kasahara scheme, an encryption system
- 7133 Kasahara, a main-belt asteroid named after Shin Kasahara
