= Olgierd Ciepły =

Polish hammer thrower (1936–2007)

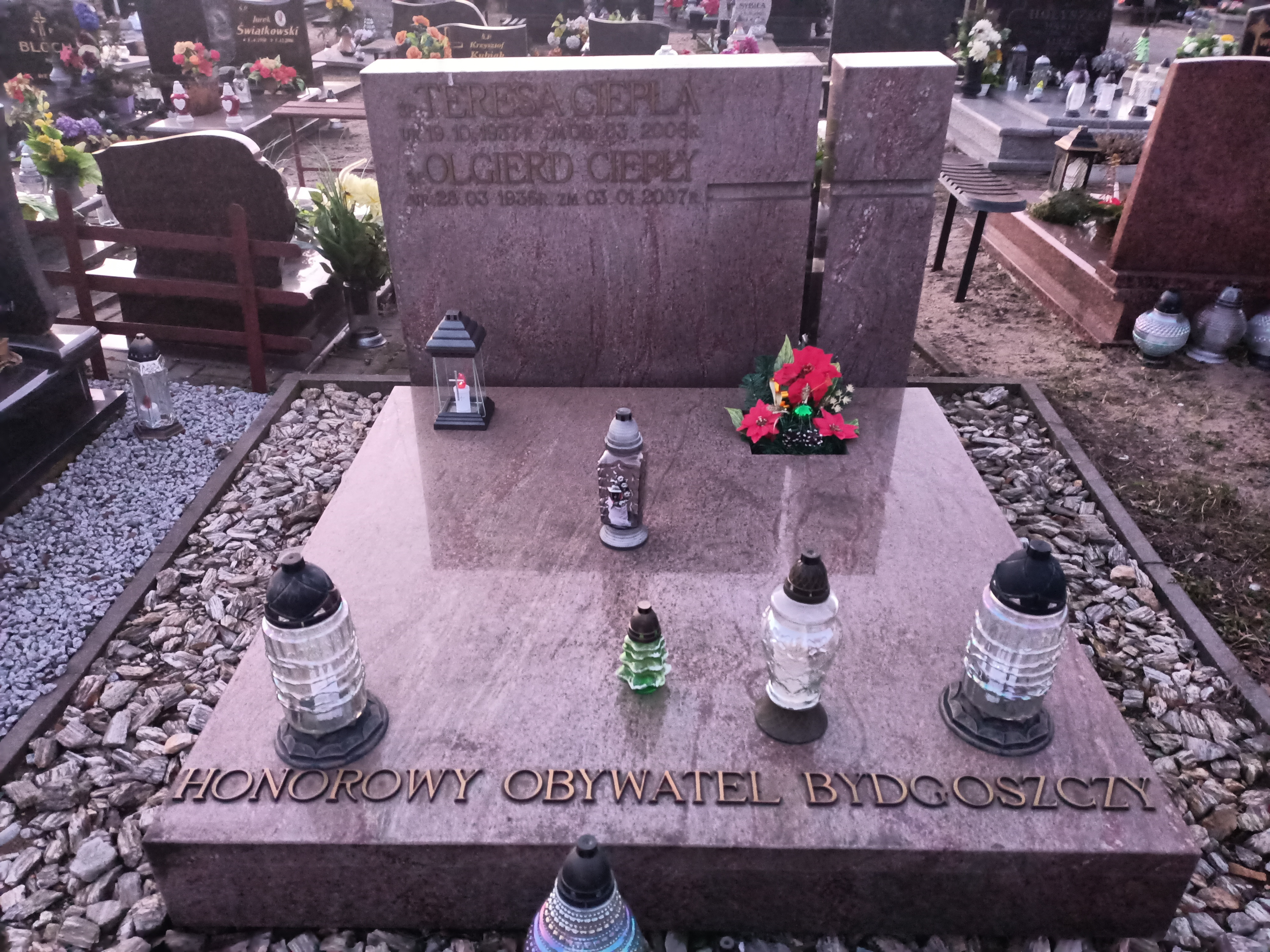
- Olgierd Ciepły's grave

Personal information
- Nationality: Polish
- Born: 28 March 1936 Chernyaty, Poland (present day Belarus)
- Died: 3 January 2007 (aged 70) Bydgoszcz, Poland

Sport
- Sport: Athletics
- Event: Hammer throw

Olgierd Ciepły (28 March 1936 – 3 January 2007) was a Polish athlete. He competed in the men's hammer throw at the 1960 Summer Olympics and the 1964 Summer Olympics.

His personal best in the event was 67.50 metres set in 1964.

He was married to fellow Olympian, Teresa Ciepły.

== International competitions ==
Year	Competition	Venue	Position	Event	Notes
Representing Poland
1958	European Championships	Stockholm, Sweden	4th	Hammer throw	63.37 m
1959	World Festival of Youth and Students	Vienna, Austria	2nd	Hammer throw	60.70 m
1960	Olympic Games	Rome, Italy	5th	Hammer throw	64.57 m
1961	Universiade	Sofia, Bulgaria	5th	Hammer throw	60.59 m
1962	European Championships	Belgrade, Yugoslavia	5th	Hammer throw	64.34 m
1964	Olympic Games	Tokyo, Japan	8th	Hammer throw	64.83 m
1965	European Cup Final	Stuttgart, West Germany	4th	Hammer throw	61.72 m
