= 1958 European Athletics Championships – Men's hammer throw =

Men's hammer throw at the European Athletics Championships

The men's hammer throw at the 1958 European Athletics Championships was held in Stockholm, Sweden, at Stockholms Olympiastadion on 19 and 21 August 1958.

== Medalists ==
Gold	Tadeusz Rut; Poland
Silver	Mikhail Krivonosov; Soviet Union
Bronze	Gyula Zsivótzky; Hungary

== Results ==
=== Final ===
21 August

Rank	Name	Nationality	Result	Notes
1st place, gold medalist(s)	Tadeusz Rut	Poland	64.78	CR NR
2nd place, silver medalist(s)	Mikhail Krivonosov	Soviet Union	63.78	
3rd place, bronze medalist(s)	Gyula Zsivótzky	Hungary	63.68	NR
4	Olgierd Ciepły	Poland	63.37	
5	Zvonko Bezjak	Yugoslavia	62.39	
6	Birger Asplund	Sweden	62.18	NR
7	John Lawlor	Ireland	61.49	
8	József Csermák	Hungary	61.00	
9	Michael Ellis	Great Britain	59.71	
10	Krešimir Račić	Yugoslavia	59.28	
11	Nicolae Rascanescu	Romania	58.53	
12	Guy Husson	France	58.52	
13	Heinrich Thun	Austria	58.17	
14	Horst Niebisch	East Germany	57.83	
15	Vasil Krumov	Bulgaria	57.82	
16	Anatoliy Samotsvetov	Soviet Union	57.00	
17	Oddvar Krogh	Norway	55.65	
18	Peter Allday	Great Britain	55.05	

=== Qualification ===
19 August

Rank	Name	Nationality	Result	Notes
1	Tadeusz Rut	Poland	62.71	Q
2	Anatoliy Samotsvetov	Soviet Union	60.42	Q
3	Heinrich Thun	Austria	60.11	Q
4	Mikhail Krivonosov	Soviet Union	59.96	Q
5	Gyula Zsivótzky	Hungary	59.83	Q
6	József Csermák	Hungary	59.71	Q
7	Olgierd Ciepły	Poland	59.48	Q
8	Nicolae Rascanescu	Romania	59.14	Q
9	Oddvar Krogh	Norway	58.33	Q
10	Krešimir Račić	Yugoslavia	58.22	Q
11	Horst Niebisch	East Germany	57.75	Q
12	Zvonko Bezjak	Yugoslavia	57.52	Q
13	Michael Ellis	Great Britain	57.26	Q
14	Vasil Krumov	Bulgaria	56.73	Q
15	Guy Husson	France	56.70	Q
16	Birger Asplund	Sweden	56.55	Q
17	John Lawlor	Ireland	55.41	Q
18	Peter Allday	Great Britain	55.24	Q
19	Silvano Giovanetti	Italy	54.45	
20	Alfons Wiegand	West Germany	54.18	

== Participation ==
According to an unofficial count, 20 athletes from 15 countries participated in the event.

- Austria (1)
- Bulgaria (1)
- East Germany (1)
- France (1)
- Hungary (2)
- Ireland (1)
- Italy (1)
- Norway (1)
- Poland (2)
- Romania (1)
- Soviet Union (2)
- Sweden (1)
- Great Britain (2)
- West Germany (1)
- Yugoslavia (2)
