= Bettina Popp =

German former track and field sprinter (born 1957)

Medal record

Women's athletics

Representing East Germany

IAAF World Cup
| Gold medal – first place | 1977 Düsseldorf | 4 × 100 m relay |

Bettina Popp (born 6 September 1957) is a German former track and field sprinter who competed in the 400 metres. Her personal best of 51.62 seconds was set in 1977. She represented East Germany and was a gold medallist in the 4 × 400 metres relay at the 1977 IAAF World Cup alongside Barbara Krug, Christina Lathan, and Marita Koch.

She was a member of SC DHfK Leipzig sports club.
