= Ursula Donath =

East German middle-distance runner (1931–2026)

Ursula Donath-
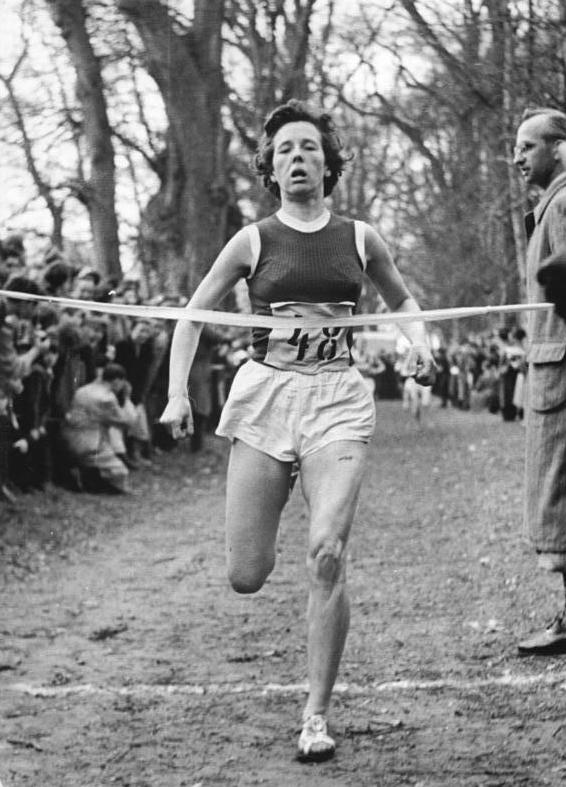
- Donath in 1955

Personal information
- Born: 30 July 1931 Saldus, Latvia
- Died: 12 April 2026 (aged 94) Halle (Saale), Germany
Medal record
Women's athletics
Representing Germany
Bronze medal – third place	1960 Rome	800 metres

Ursula Donath (née Jurewitz, later Brehme, 30 July 1931 – 12 April 2026) was an athlete from East Germany who specialised in the 400 metres and 800 metres. She was born in Saldus, Latvia.

Her biggest achievement came at the 1960 Summer Olympics, where she competed for the United Team of Germany. She won the bronze medal in the 800 metres.

Donath was also a prolific winner at the World Student Games. At the 1954 edition she won the 400 and 800 metres. At the 1955 edition she won the 400 metres with a bronze medal in the 800 metres, while the 1957 edition brought her a silver medal in the 400 and gold in the 800 metres.

She won the East German national title in 400 metres, representing the club SC Chemie Halle. This was the inaugural national 400 metres competition. She was even more prolific in the East German cross-country championships, which she won in 1951 (inaugural), 1952, 1953, 1954, 1955, 1956, 1957 and 1960. During these years, Donath also helped SC Chemie Halle win the club competition in 1957, 1960 and 1961.

Donath died in Halle (Saale) on 12 April 2026, at the age of 94.
