= Tadeusz Rut =

Polish athlete (1931–2002)

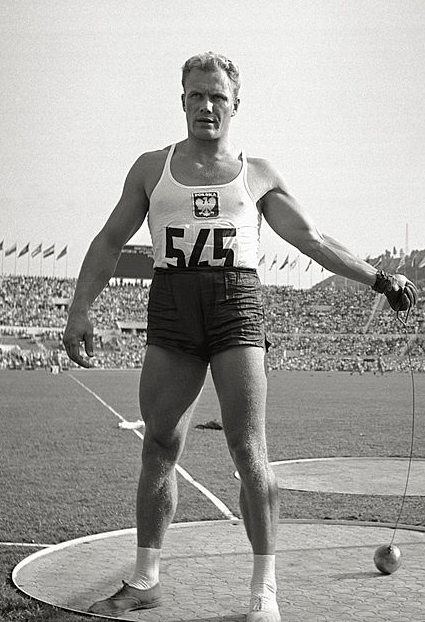
- Tadeusz Rut at the 1960 Olympics

Personal information
- Born: 11 October 1931 Przeworsk, Poland
- Died: 27 March 2002 (aged 70) Warsaw, Poland
- Height: 1.83 m (6 ft 0 in)
- Weight: 90 kg (198 lb)

Sport
- Sport: Athletics
- Events: Hammer throw, discus throw
- Club: MKS Czarni (1949–1951); OWKS (1952–1953); Odry (1956–1957); Burzy Wrocław (1958); Legia Warsaw (1959–1967)
- Coached by: Sławomir Zieleniewski, Paweł Kozubek

Achievements and titles
- Personal bests: HT – 67.07 m (1964); DT – 51.09 m (1959)
Medal record
Men's athletics
Representing Poland
Olympic Games
Bronze medal – third place	1960 Rome	Hammer throw
European Championships
Gold medal – first place	1958 Stockholm	Hammer throw

Tadeusz Rut (11 October 1931 – 27 March 2002) was a Polish athlete. He competed at the 1956, 1960 and 1964 Olympics in the hammer throw and won a bronze medal in 1960. In 1956 he also finished 17th in the discus throw and was selected as the Olympic flag bearer for Poland. At the European championships he won a gold medal in 1958 setting a new continental record. That year he was ranked as the world's best hammer thrower.

Rut was born in a family of a carpenter in Przeworsk, and completed his school studies in Wrocław in 1950. In 1966 he received a master's degree in sanitation engineering. During his athletics career Rut won 8 national titles in the hammer throw (1955–1958, 1961, 1964, 1965) and discus throw (1956) and set 18 national records.

== International competitions ==
Year	Competition	Venue	Position	Event	Notes
Representing Poland
1954	European Championships	Bern, Switzerland	4th	Hammer throw	57.70 m
1955	World Festival of Youth and Students	Warsaw, Poland	5th	Hammer throw	58.65 m
1956	Olympic Games	Melbourne, Australia	17th (q)	Discus throw	46.62 m
1956	Olympic Games	Melbourne, Australia	14th	Hammer throw	53.43 m
1958	European Championships	Stockholm, Sweden	1st	Hammer throw	64.78 m
1960	Olympic Games	Rome, Italy	3rd	Hammer throw	65.64 m
1962	European Championships	Belgrade, Yugoslavia	8th	Hammer throw	62.95 m
1964	Olympic Games	Tokyo, Japan	10th	Hammer throw	64.52 m
1966	European Championships	Budapest, Hungary	13th (q)	Hammer throw	61.26 m

Olympic Games
Preceded by Teodor Kocerka	Flagbearer for Poland; 1956 Melbourne	Succeeded by Teodor Kocerka
