= 1977 IAAF World Cup =

International track and field sporting event

The 1st IAAF World Cup in Athletics was an international track and field sporting event sponsored by the International Association of Athletics Federations, held from 2 to 4 September 1977, at the Rheinstadion in Düsseldorf, West Germany.

== Overall results ==
=== Men ===
Pos.	Team	Result
1	East Germany	127
2	United States	120
3	West Germany	112
4	Europe	111
5	America	92
6	Africa	78
7	Oceania	48
8	Asia	44

=== Women ===
Pos.	Team	Result
1	Europe	109
2	East Germany	93
3	Soviet Union	90
4	United States	60
5	America	56
6	Oceania	46
7	Africa	32
8	Asia	30

== Medal summary ==
=== Men ===
Event	Gold		Silver		Bronze	
100 metres	Steve Williams (USA); United States	10.13	Eugen Ray (GDR); East Germany	10.15	Silvio Leonard (CUB); America	10.19
200 metres	Clancy Edwards (USA); United States	20.17	Pietro Mennea (ITA); Europe	20.17	Silvio Leonard (CUB); America	20.30
400 metres	Alberto Juantorena (CUB); America	45.36	Volker Beck (GDR); East Germany	45.50	Robert Taylor (USA); United States	45.57
800 metres	Alberto Juantorena (CUB); America	1:44.04	Mike Boit (KEN); Africa	1:44.14	Willi Wülbeck (FRG); West Germany	1:45.47
1500 metres	Steve Ovett (GBR); Europe	3:34.45	Thomas Wessinghage (FRG); West Germany	3:35.98	Jürgen Straub (GDR); East Germany	3:37.50
5000 metres	Miruts Yifter (ETH); Africa	13:13.82	Marty Liquori (USA); United States	13:15.06	David Fitzsimons (AUS); Oceania	13:17.42
10,000 metres	Miruts Yifter (ETH); Africa	28:32.31	Jörg Peter (GDR); East Germany	28:34.00	Jos Hermens (NED); Europe	28:35.00
110 metre hurdles	Thomas Munkelt (GDR); East Germany	13.41	Alejandro Casañas (CUB); America	13.50	Charles Foster (USA); United States	13.51
400 metre hurdles	Edwin Moses (USA); United States	47.58	Volker Beck (GDR); East Germany	48.83	Harald Schmid (FRG); West Germany	48.85
3000 metre steeplechase	Michael Karst (FRG); West Germany	8:21.60	Eshetu Tura (ETH); Africa	8:22.50	George Malley (USA); United States	8:25.20
4×100 metre relay	United States; Bill Collins; Steve Riddick; Cliff Wiley; Steve Williams	38.03 WR	East Germany; Manfred Kokot; Eugen Ray; Detlef Kübeck; Alexander Thieme	38.57	America; Rui da Silva; Silvio Leonard; Don Quarrie; Osvaldo Lara	38.66
4×400 metre relay	West Germany; Lothar Krieg; Franz-Peter Hofmeister; Harald Schmid; Bernd Herrmann	3:01.34	Europe; Josip Alebić; Francis Demarthon; David Jenkins; Ryszard Podlas	3:02.47	America; Delmo da Silva; Fred Sowerby; Brian Saunders; Alberto Juantorena	3:02.66
High jump	Rolf Beilschmidt (GDR); East Germany	2.30	Dwight Stones (USA); United States	2.27	Jacek Wszoła (POL); Europe	2.24
Pole vault	Mike Tully (USA); United States	5.60	Władysław Kozakiewicz (POL); Europe	5.55	Axel Weber (GDR); East Germany	5.30
Long jump	Arnie Robinson (USA); United States	8.19	Hans Baumgartner (FRG); West Germany	7.96	Charlton Ehizuelen (NGR); Africa	7.89
Triple jump	João Carlos de Oliveira (BRA); America	16.68	Anatoliy Piskulin (URS); Europe	16.61	Klaus Hufnagel (GDR); East Germany	16.43
Shot put	Udo Beyer (GDR); East Germany	21.74	Reijo Ståhlberg (FIN); Europe	20.46	Ralf Reichenbach (FRG); West Germany	19.97
Discus throw	Wolfgang Schmidt (GDR); East Germany	67.14	Mac Wilkins (USA); United States	66.64	Hein-Direck Neu (FRG); West Germany	62.64
Hammer throw	Karl-Hans Riehm (FRG); West Germany	75.64	Jochen Sachse (GDR); East Germany	75.40	Peter Farmer (AUS); Oceania	73.92
Javelin throw	Michael Wessing (FRG); West Germany	87.46	Wolfgang Hanisch (GDR); East Germany	84.28	Miklós Németh (HUN); Europe	80.82

=== Women ===
Event	Gold		Silver		Bronze	
100 metres	Marlies Oelsner (GDR); East Germany	11.16	Sonia Lannaman (GBR); Europe	11.26	Silvia Chivás (CUB); America	11.34
200 metres	Irena Szewińska (POL); Europe	22.72	Bärbel Eckert (GDR); East Germany	23.02	Tatyana Prorochenko (URS); Soviet Union	23.26
400 metres	Irena Szewińska (POL); Europe	49.52	Marita Koch (GDR); East Germany	49.76	Marina Sidorova (URS); Soviet Union	51.29
800 metres	Totka Petrova (BUL); Europe	1:59.20	Christine Liebetrau (GDR); East Germany	1:59.47	Svetlana Styrkina (URS); Soviet Union	1:59.72
1500 metres	Tatyana Kazankina (URS); Soviet Union	4:12.74	Francie Larrieu (USA); United States	4:13.00	Ulrike Bruns (GDR); East Germany	4:13.10
3000 metres	Grete Waitz (NOR); Europe	8:43.50	Lyudmila Bragina (URS); Soviet Union	8:46.30	Jan Merrill (USA); United States	8:46.60
100 metre hurdles	Grażyna Rabsztyn (POL); Europe	12.70	Johanna Klier (GDR); East Germany	12.86	Lyubov Nikitenko (URS); Soviet Union	12.87
4×100 metre relay	Europe; Elvira Possekel; Andrea Lynch; Annegret Richter; Sonia Lannaman	42.51	East Germany; Monika Hamann; Romy Schneider; Ingrid Brestrich; Marlies Oelsner	42.65	Soviet Union; Vera Anisimova; Lyudmila Maslakova; Marina Sidorova; Lyudmila Storozhkova	42.91
4×400 metre relay	East Germany; Bettina Popp; Barbara Krug; Christina Brehmer; Marita Koch	3:24.04	Europe; Rita Bottiglieri; Donna Hartley; Dagmar Fuhrmann; Irena Szewińska	3:25.80	Soviet Union; Lyudmila Aksyonova; Natalya Sokolova; Tatyana Prorochenko; Marina Sidorova	3:27.00
High jump	Rosemarie Ackermann (GDR); East Germany	1.98	Sara Simeoni (ITA); Europe	1.92	Debbie Brill (CAN); America	1.89
Long jump	Lyn Jacenko (AUS); Oceania	6.54	Jarmila Nygrýnová (TCH); Europe	6.48	Tatyana Skachko (URS); Soviet Union	6.48
Shot put	Helena Fibingerová (TCH); Europe	20.63 ^{1}	Svetlana Krachevskaya (URS); Soviet Union	20.39	Maren Seidler (USA); United States	15.50
Discus throw	Faina Veleva (URS); Soviet Union	68.10	Argentina Menis (ROU); Europe	63.38	Sabine Engel (GDR); East Germany	63.12
Javelin throw	Ruth Fuchs (GDR); East Germany	62.36	Nadezhda Yakubovich (URS); Soviet Union	62.02	Tessa Sanderson (GBR); Europe	60.30

^{1} Ilona Schoknecht of East Germany originally won the shot put with 20.93m, but she was disqualified after it was found that she had failed a doping test at the European Cup.
