= Hildrun Laufer-Claus =

East German long jumper

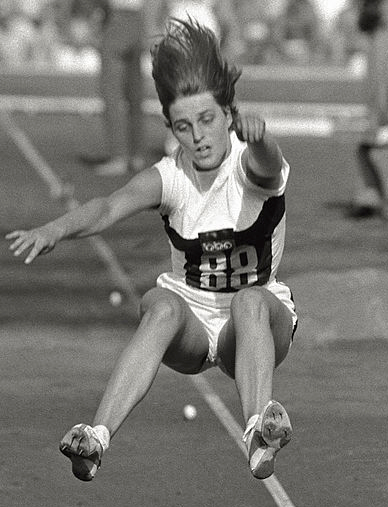
- Hildrun Claus at the 1960 Olympics

Personal information
- Born: 13 May 1939 (age 87) Dresden, Germany
- Height: 1.72 m (5 ft 8 in)
- Weight: 66 kg (146 lb)

Sport
- Sport: Athletics
- Event: Long jump
- Club: SC Dynamo Berlin

Achievements and titles
- Personal best: 6.48 m (1964)
Medal record
Women's athletics
Representing Germany
Olympic Games
Bronze medal – third place	1960 Rome	Long jump

Hildrun Laufer-Claus (née Claus; born 13 May 1939) is a former East German athlete. She competed in the long jump at the 1960 and 1964 Summer Olympics and finished in third and seventh place, respectively.

Claus was born in Dresden, but later moved to East Berlin. She won East German championships in the long jump in 1957–1962 and 1964, and set three world records (6.36 m and 6.40 m in 1960 and 6.42 m in 1961). She married Peter Laufer, a German Olympic pole vaulter, and at the 1964 Games competed as Hildrun Laufer-Claus. She has a degree of a landscape designer. In 1995 she was paralyzed as a result of a sports-related accident.
