= Gyula Zsivótzky =

Hungarian hammer thrower

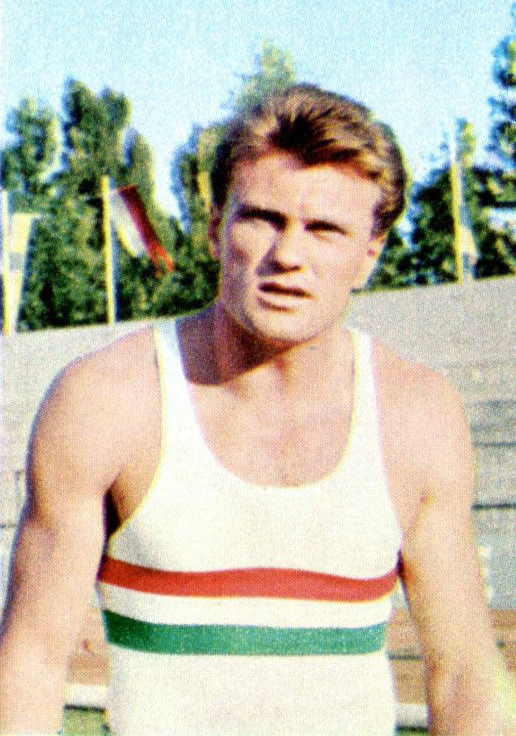
- Zsivótzky in 1969

Personal information
- Nationality: Hungarian
- Born: 25 February 1937 Budapest, Hungary
- Died: 29 September 2007 (aged 70) Budapest, Hungary
- Height: 1.90 m (6 ft 3 in)
- Weight: 102 kg (225 lb)

Sport
- Country: Hungary
- Sport: Athletics
- Event: Hammer throw
- Club: Újpesti TE

Achievements and titles
- Personal best: 73.76 m (1968)
Medal record
Men's athletics
Representing Hungary
Olympic Games
Gold medal – first place	1968 Mexico City	Hammer throw
Silver medal – second place	1960 Rome	Hammer throw
Silver medal – second place	1964 Tokyo	Hammer throw
European Championships
Gold medal – first place	1962 Belgrade	Hammer throw
Silver medal – second place	1966 Budapest	Hammer throw
Bronze medal – third place	1958 Stockholm	Hammer throw
Universiade
Gold medal – first place	1959 Torino	Hammer throw
Gold medal – first place	1961 Sofia	Hammer throw
Gold medal – first place	1965 Budapest	Hammer throw

Gyula Zsivótzky (25 February 1937 – 29 September 2007) was a Hungarian hammer thrower. He won a gold medal at the 1968 Olympics, silvers in 1960 and 1964, and finished fifth in 1972. Zsivótzky set two world record: one in 1965 and the other in 1968. He was twice elected as Hungarian Sportsman of the Year: in 1965, after winning at the Summer Universiade, and in 1968, for his Olympic gold medal.

Zsivótzky won the British AAA Championships title in the hammer throw event at the 1965 AAA Championships and 1966 AAA Championships.

Zsivótzky retired in 1973 and later worked in the clothing industry. He remained involved with athletics as an administrator, becoming a member of the Hungarian Olympic Committee and vice-president of his athletic club Újpesti TE. He married Magdolna Komka, an Olympic high jumper. One of his sons is decathlete Attila Zsivoczky, the other is football player Gyula Zsivóczky Jr.

Zsivótzky died from cancer in his native Budapest, aged 70.

Records
Preceded by (United States) Harold Connolly	Men's Hammer World Record Holder; 4 September 1965 – 15 June 1969	Succeeded by (Soviet Union) Romuald Klim
Awards
Preceded by Ferenc Török	Hungarian Sportsman of The Year; 1965	Succeeded by András Balczó
Preceded by István Kozma	Hungarian Sportsman of The Year; 1968	Succeeded by András Balczó
