= Arthur Hannemann =

German middle-distance runner (born 1935)

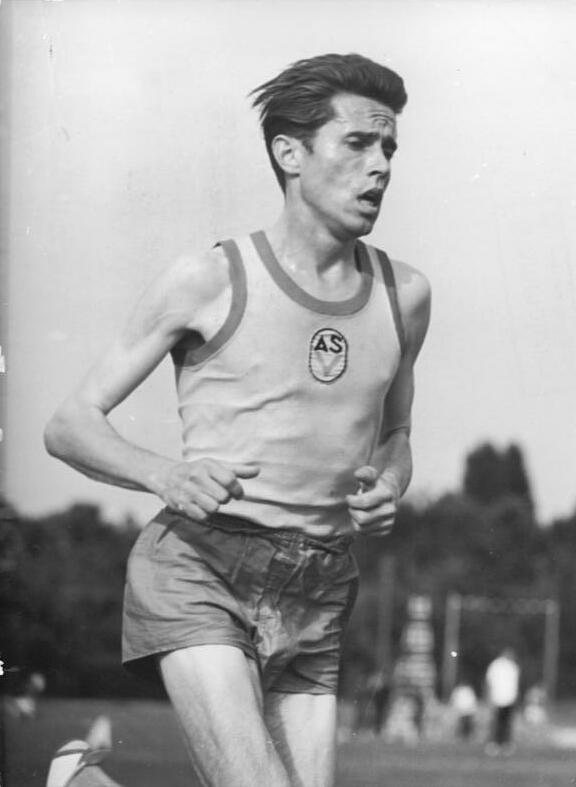
- Hannemann in 1963

Personal information
- Nationality: German
- Born: 23 October 1935 (age 90)

Sport
- Sport: Middle-distance running
- Event: 1500 metres

Arthur Hannemann (born 23 October 1935) is a German former middle-distance runner. He competed in the men's 1500 metres at the 1960 Summer Olympics.
