= Uwe Langhammer =

East German pole vaulter (born 1965)

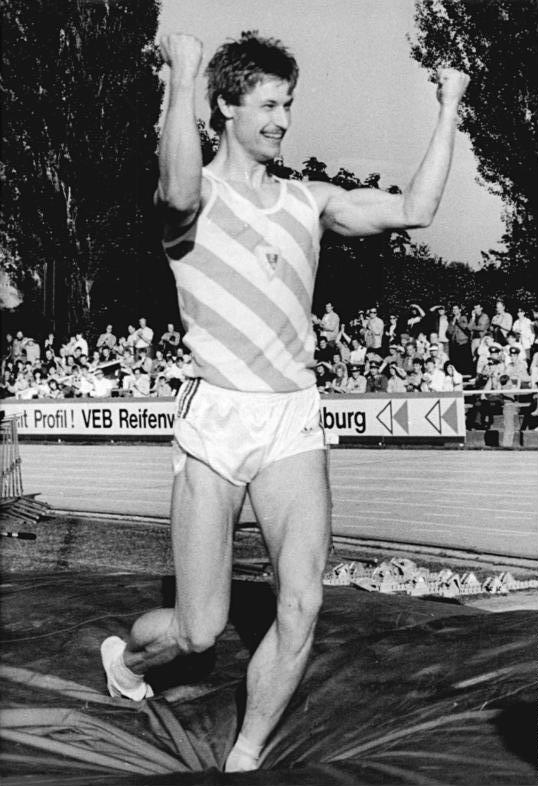
- Uwe Langhammer (1987)
- Born: 12 June 1965 (age 60); Apolda, East Germany
- Awards: Bronze Medal, 1989 IAAF World Cup

Uwe Langhammer (born 12 June 1965 in Apolda, Thuringia) is a retired East German pole vaulter.

He won the bronze medal at the 1989 IAAF World Cup. He became the East German champion in from 1986 to 1990, representing the SC Motor Jena club. He had represented SC Turbine Erfurt before 1982, and TuS Jena after 1990. He also became indoor champion in 1990.

His personal best jump was 5.65 metres, achieved in August 1987 in Potsdam.
