= Rainer Pottel =

East German decathlete

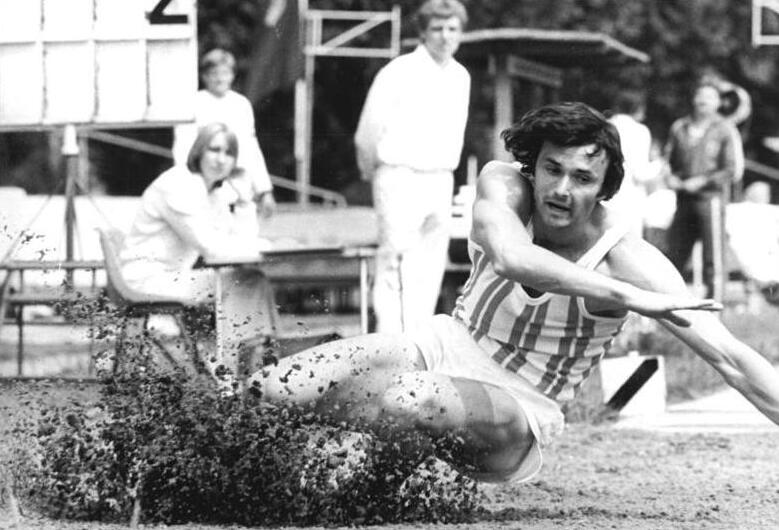
Rainer Pottel on 24 May 1981 in Halle

Rainer Pottel (born 29 August 1953 in Berlin) is a retired decathlete, who represented East Germany in the 1970s and 1980s. He had the best performance in the world in 1981, collecting 8,334 points at a meet in Birmingham, England (30 August 1981). He is a three-time national champion (1974, 1977 and 1981) for East Germany in the men's decathlon.

== Sources ==
- 1981 Year List
- GBRathletics
- sports-reference
