= Hermann Buhl (runner) =

German middle-distance runner

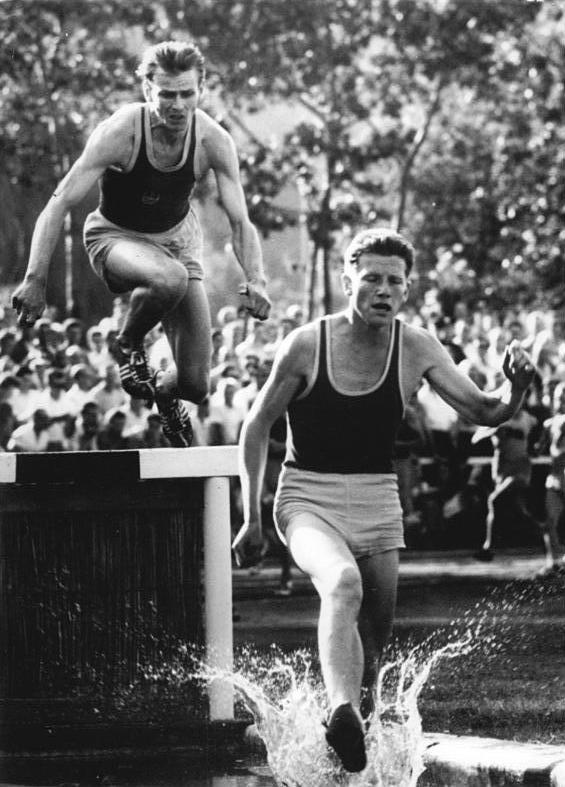
- Hermann Buhl (front) in 1958

Personal information
- Nationality: German
- Born: 31 October 1935 Freital, Saxony, Nazi Germany
- Died: 22 March 2014 (aged 78) Tyrol, Austria

Sport
- Sport: Middle-distance running
- Event: Steeplechase

Hermann Buhl (31 October 1935 – 22 March 2014) was a German middle-distance runner and sports physician. He was notable for his achievements in the 3000 metres steeplechase and his subsequent career in sports medicine.

== Early life ==
Buhl was born on 31 October 1935 in the Hainsberg Subdivision of Freital, Saxony, Germany.

== Athletic career ==
Buhl specialized in the 3000 metres steeplechase. He was affiliated with ASK Vorwärts Berlin, a prominent sports club in East Berlin. Standing at 175 cm and weighing 66 kg, he secured the East German national steeplechase title in 1958, 1959, 1961, and 1962.

At the 1960 Summer Olympics in Rome, representing the United Team of Germany, Buhl competed in the men's 3000 metres steeplechase but was eliminated.

Buhl is also remembered for a notable incident in 1958, where he fell headfirst into the water jump during a steeplechase race, a moment captured in the "Sport Picture of the Year," yet he managed to win that race.

== Post-athletic career ==
After retiring from competitive athletics, Buhl pursued a career in medicine. He became a doctor and physician in the GDR, and later in Reunified Germany. In March 2014, during a mountain hike in the Tyrolean area of Reith near Seefeld, Austria, Buhl went missing. Despite extensive search efforts, his body was not discovered until 19 August 2014, at an elevation of 1700 meters. The exact cause of death remains undetermined, though evidence suggests he did not suffer a severe fall.
