= Werner Heyer =

German racewalker

Personal information
- Nationality: German
- Born: 14 November 1956 (age 69)

Sport
- Sport: Athletics
- Event: Racewalking

Werner Heyer (born 14 November 1956) is a German racewalker. He competed in the men's 20 kilometres walk at the 1980 Summer Olympics.
