= Ingrid Lotz =

East German discus thrower

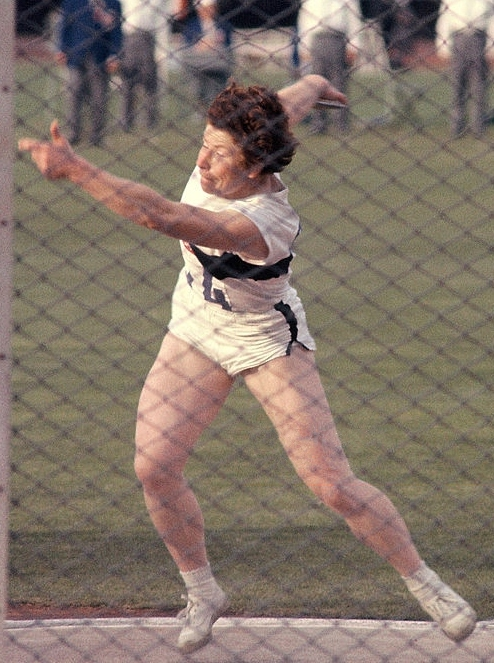
- Lotz at the 1964 Olympics

Personal information
- Born: 11 March 1934 (age 92) Malliß, Germany
- Height: 1.69 m (5 ft 7 in)
- Weight: 74 kg (163 lb)
- Spouse: Martin Lotz

Sport
- Sport: Discus throw
- Club: SC DHfK, Leipzig

Achievements and titles
- Personal best: 57.21 m (1964)
Medal record
Women's athletics
Representing Germany
Olympic Games
Silver medal – second place	1964 Tokyo	Discus throw

Ingrid Lotz (née Eichmann on 11 March 1934) is a retired East German discus thrower. She won a silver medal at the 1964 Summer Olympics for the United Team of Germany, with her all-time best throw of 57.21 m. Her husband, Martin Lotz competed in the hammer throw at the same Olympics. Next year she finished third at the 1965 European Cup.
