= Rudolf Langer =

German athlete (born 1939)

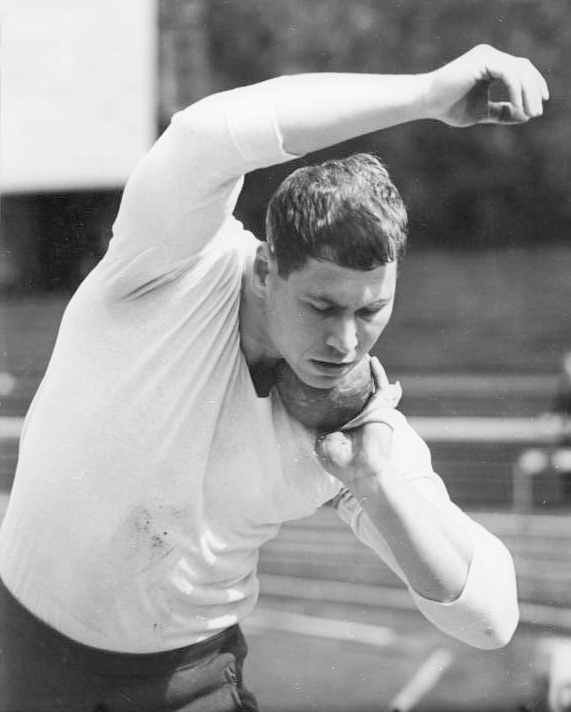
- Rudolf Langer in 1963

Personal information
- Born: 29 March 1939 (age 87) Sprottau, Germany
- Height: 1.91 m (6 ft 3 in)
- Weight: 105 kg (231 lb)

Sport
- Sport: Athletics
- Club: SC Magdeburg

Rudolf Langer (born 29 March 1939) is a retired German athlete. He competed at the 1964 Summer Olympics in the men's shot put and finished in 11th place. His wife Johanna Lüttge competed in the women's shot put at the same Olympics. His personal best is 19.83 m (1969).
