= Waltraud Strotzer =

German middle-distance runner

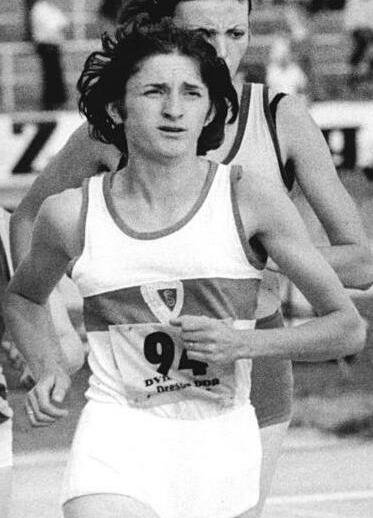
- Strotzer in 1977

Personal information
- Born: 16 September 1952 (age 73) Wünschendorf/Elster, East Germany

Sport
- Sport: Track and field
Medal record
Representing East Germany
European Junior Championships
Gold medal – first place	1970 Paris	800m
Silver medal – second place	1968 Leipzig	800m

Waltraud Strotzer (née Pöhland, born 16 September 1952) is a German middle distance runner who specialized in the 800 metres.

As a teenager she won the silver medal at the 1968 European Junior Championships and the gold medal at the 1970 European Junior Championships. She also competed at the European Championships in 1966, 1969 and 1971 without reaching the final.

In domestic competitions, she represented the sports club SC Motor Jena. She became East German indoor champion in 1970 and 1971. In 1975 she became 1500 metres champion.
