= Jürgen Busch =

German long-distance runner (born 1942)

Personal information
- Nationality: German
- Born: 24 December 1942 (age 83) Deuben, Germany
- Height: 162 cm (5 ft 4 in)
- Weight: 53 kg (117 lb)

Sport
- Sport: Long-distance running
- Event: Marathon
- Club: ASK Vorwärts Potsdam

Jürgen Busch (born 24 December 1942) is a German long-distance runner. He competed in the marathon at the 1968 Summer Olympics representing East Germany.

Busch finished third behind Ron Hill in the marathon event at the 1971 AAA Championships.
