= Karl Thierfelder =

German triple jumper

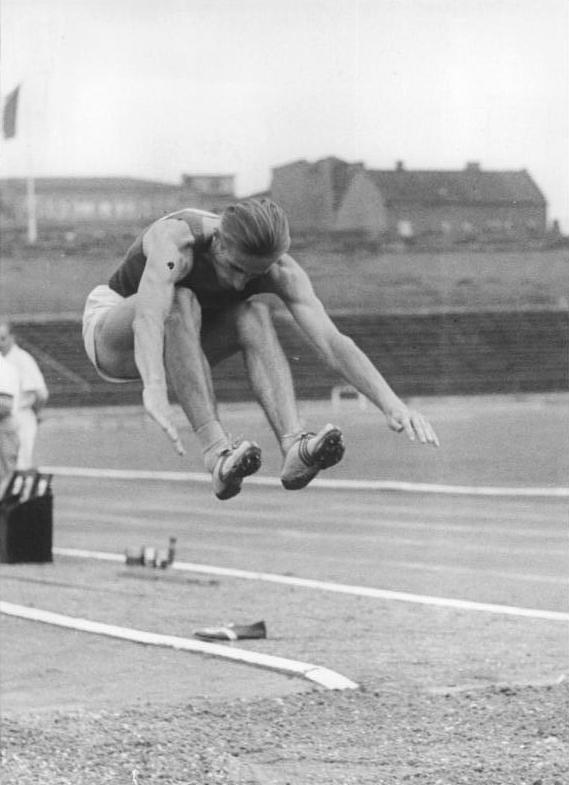
- Karl Thierfelder in 1957

Personal information
- Nationality: German
- Born: 9 August 1933 (age 92) Geyer, Erzgebirgskreis, Saxony, Germany
- Height: 1.77 m (5 ft 10 in)
- Weight: 65 kg (143 lb)

Sport
- Sport: Athletics
- Events: Triple jump, Long jump

Karl Thierfelder (born 9 August 1933) is a former track and field athlete who competed for the German Democratic Republic (East Germany). In both 1957 and 1960 he became the East German champion in the triple jump. He competed in the men's triple jump at the 1960 Summer Olympics.

== Biography ==
At the East German Championships in 1956, Thierfelder competed in the high jump and triple jump. In the high jump he came third with 1.80m behind Günter Lein and Werner Pfeil, in the triple jump he took second place with 14.23m behind Klaus Hübschmann. The following year he came sixth in the high jump with 1.80m and he won the triple jump with 14.84m. In 1958 he jumped 15.32m at the East German championships in the triple jump, but only finished second because Wolfgang Kleinert had increased the East German record to 15.50m. In 1959, Thierfelder jumped 15.48m and came second behind Manfred Hinze, who had jumped 16.04m. In 1959 Thierfelder also started at the UIE Weeks, the Universiade of the Eastern Bloc, and won bronze with a jump of 14.57m.

In 1960, Karl Thierfelder managed to win two championship titles: he won the long jump with 7.51m and the triple jump with 15.63m. In the triple jump, Thierfelder was also able to qualify for the United Team of Germany, but dropped out at the 1960 Olympic Games in Rome with 15.0m as 23rd in the qualification. After coming fourth place in 1961, Thiefelder finished second behind Manfred Hinze at the 1962 East German Championships with a jump of 15.74m. At the 1962 European Championships in Belgrade, the triple jump was one of the few disciplines in which all three starting places for the all-German team were occupied by athletes from East Germany. While Manfred Hinze and Hans-Jürgen Rückborn qualified for the final, Thierfelder again took 23rd place in the qualification with 14.94m. In 1963, Thierfelder once again took third place in the East German Championships, and in 1964 he finished sixth in the long jump.

Karl Thierfelder mainly competed for SC Dynamo Berlin, with a height of 1.77m and a weight of 65 kg.

== Best performances ==
- Long Jump: 7.54m 1962
- Triple Jump: 16.04m 1964
