= Christina Liebetrau =

German track and field athlete

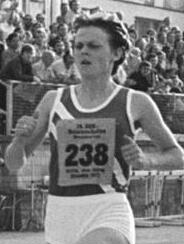
- Liebetrau at the 1977 East German Championships

Medal record

Women's athletics

Representing East Germany

IAAF World Cup
Silver medal – second place	1977 Dusseldorf	800 m

Christina Liebetrau (née Neumann; born 30 December 1953) is a former East German track and field athlete who competed in the 800 metres. She set a personal best of 1:58.81 minutes in 1976. Her sole international successes came in the 1977 season when she was a silver medallist at the 1977 IAAF World Cup and the winner at the 1977 European Cup.

She was a three-time national champion during her career. She won the 800 m in 1975 and completed an 800/1500 metres double at the East German Athletics Championships in 1977. She represented the club SC Turbine Erfurt.
