= Gerhard Hönicke =

German long-distance runner (1930–1984)

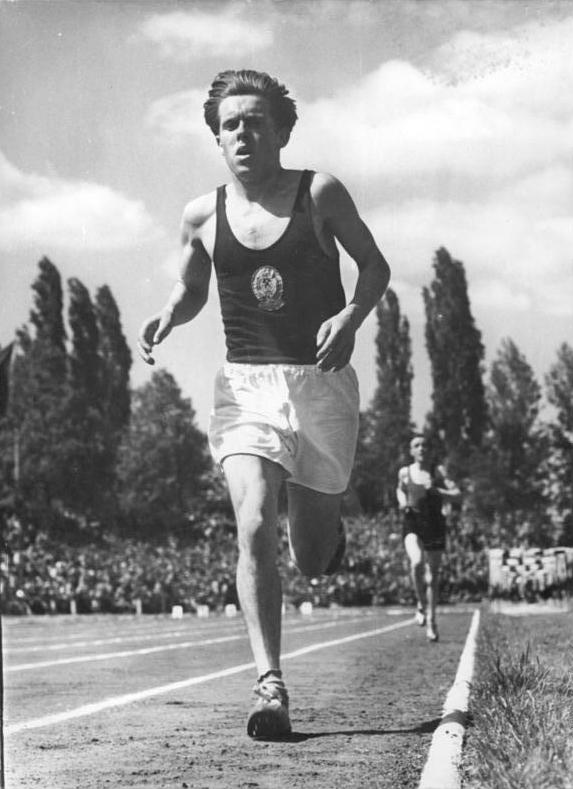
- Gerhard Hönicke in 1955

Personal information
- Nationality: German
- Born: 25 March 1930 Hirschstein, Germany
- Died: 5 November 1984 (aged 54) Karl-Marx-Stadt, East Germany

Sport
- Sport: Long-distance running
- Event: Marathon

Gerhard Hönicke (25 March 1930 – 5 November 1984) was a German long-distance runner. He competed in the 10,000 metres at the 1960 Summer Olympics and the marathon at the 1964 Summer Olympics.
