= Bärbel Löhnert =

German long jumper

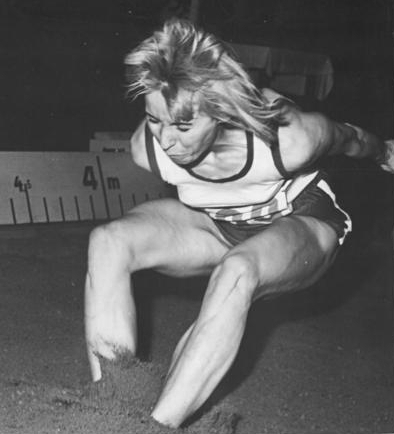
- Bärbel Löhnert in 1967

Personal information
- Nationality: German
- Born: 23 September 1942 (age 83)

Sport
- Sport: Athletics
- Event: Long jump

Bärbel Löhnert (born 23 September 1942) is a German athlete. She competed in the women's long jump at the 1968 Summer Olympics.
