= Siegfried Herrmann =

German long-distance runner (1932–2017)

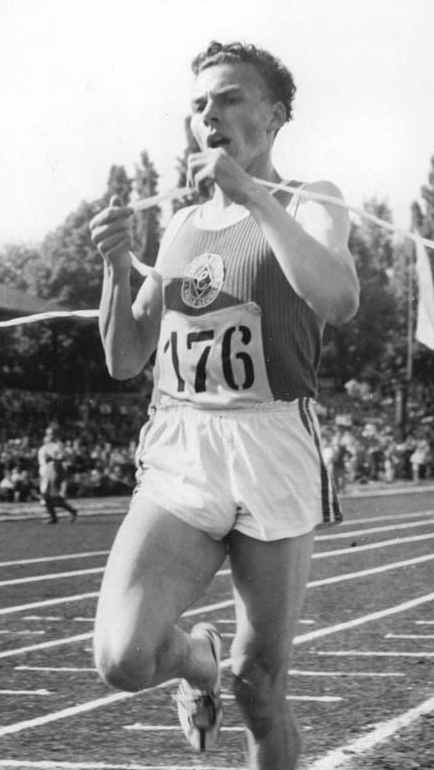
- Siegfried Herrmann in 1956

Personal information
- Born: 7 November 1932 Unterschönau, Thuringia, Germany
- Died: 14 February 2017 (aged 84) Erfurt, Thuringia, Germany
- Height: 1.75 m (5 ft 9 in)
- Weight: 67 kg (148 lb)

Sport
- Sport: Athletics
- Club: BSG Einheit Mitte Halle; Sportclub Chemie Halle; Sportclub Turbine Erfurt

Siegfried Herrmann (7 November 1932 – 14 February 2017) was a German long-distance runner. Shortly before the 1956 Olympics his time in the 1500 m, was only 1.2 seconds behind the world record. However, he tore an Achilles tendon at the Olympics and failed to reach the final. He later changed to longer distances and at the 1964 Summer Olympics finished 11th in the 10,000 m event.

In 1965 he set a world record in 3000 m. Next year he finished second in this event at the 1966 European Indoor Games.

After retirement from competitions, between 1976 and 2000 he worked as athletics coach.

Herrmann died on 14 February 2017, aged 84.

Records
Preceded by Michel Jazy	Men's 3000 m world record holder 5 August 1965 – 27 August 1965	Succeeded by Kipchoge Keino
