= Christian Voigt =

German hurdler

Personal information
- Nationality: German
- Born: 20 December 1943 (age 82)

Sport
- Sport: Track and field
- Event: 110 metres hurdles

Christian Voigt (born 20 December 1943) is a German hurdler. He competed in the men's 110 metres hurdles at the 1964 Summer Olympics.
