= Joachim Singer =

German hurdler

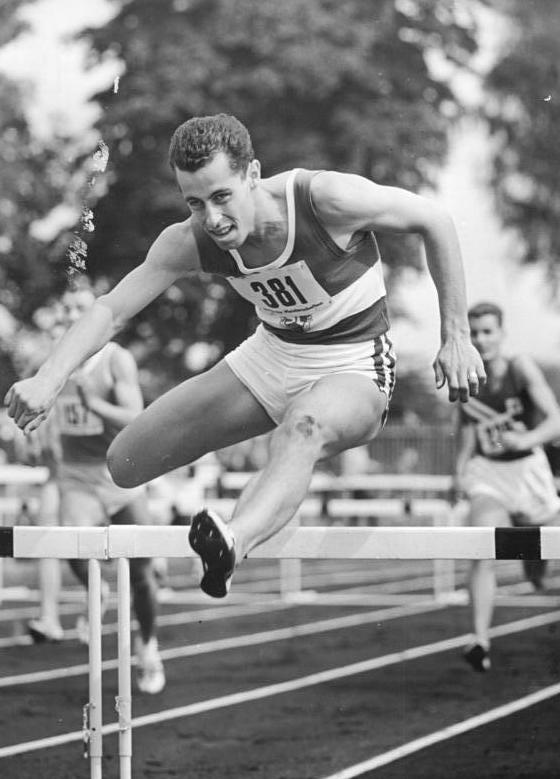
- Singer at the 1963 German Athletics Championships in Jena

Personal information
- Nationality: German
- Born: 5 November 1942 (age 83)

Sport
- Sport: Track and field
- Event: 400 metres hurdles

Joachim Singer (born 5 November 1942) is a German hurdler. He competed in the men's 400 metres hurdles at the 1964 Summer Olympics.
