= Ralf Pönitzsch =

German distance runner

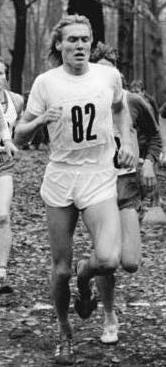
Ralf Pönitzsch competing in a race in 1978

Ralf Pönitzsch (born 20 October 1957) is a former East German runner who specialized in the 3000 metres steeplechase.

He won the silver medal in this event at the 1979 IAAF World Cup behind Kip Rono. He won four East German national titles (1976, 1977, 1979, 1981) in his special distance as well as the 5000 metres title in 1979. He competed for the sports club SC Karl-Marx-Stadt during his active career.

He also competed in the men's 3000 metres steeplechase at the 1980 Summer Olympics.
