= Kasahara Kenju =

Kasahara Kenju (笠原 研寿, 1852–1883) was a Japanese priest and scholar of Buddhism and Indology.

With Takakusu Junjiro and Nanjo Bunyu, Kasahara was sent to the United Kingdom in 1876. Nanjo, the son of an abbot in the Ōtani sect of Shin Buddhism, and Kasahara, as a young priest, were selected by the future leader of the group, Ōtani Kōzui, to study Sanskrit and collect Buddhist text in Europe in order to counter the threat of Christian proselytism. They studied Sanskrit and Pali texts at Oxford under the academic guidance of Max Müller, seeking a more authentic understanding of Buddhist teachings from their original languages. Previously they had only used Chinese texts that were possibly dubious translations. They were the first Japanese scholars to study Buddhism from the perspective of Western "Buddhology".

However in 1882, Kasahara was forced to cut short his studies due to a severe and worsening case of tuberculosis. While returning to Japan from England, he spent three weeks touring Buddhist sites in Sri Lanka (then Ceylon), including the Temple of the Tooth and Anuradhapura, the ancient Sinhalese capital. He arrived in Japanese in November 1882 and died less than 12 months later in 1883.
