= Klaus Hufnagel =

German triple jumper

Medal record

Men's athletics

Representing East Germany

IAAF World Cup
Bronze medal – third place	1977 Düsseldorf	Triple jump

Klaus Hufnagel (born 16 June 1955) is a former East German track and field athlete who competed in the triple jump. He was a bronze medallist at the IAAF World Cup in 1977.

At national level, he was a five-time champion, taking four titles at the East German Athletics Championships (1976, 1977, 1979, 1980) and one title at the East German Indoor Athletics Championships (1979). He was a member of SC Magdeburg sports club.
