= Manfred Hinze =

German triple jumper

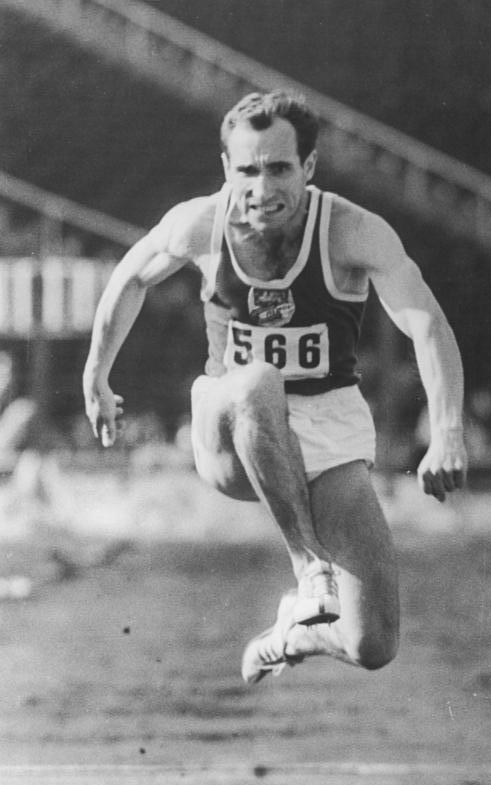
- Manfred Hinze in 1960

Personal information
- Nationality: German
- Born: 8 January 1933 (age 92)

Sport
- Sport: Athletics
- Event: Triple jump

Manfred Hinze (born 8 January 1933) is a German athlete. He competed in the men's triple jump at the 1960 Summer Olympics and the 1964 Summer Olympics.
