= Marco Delonge =

German long jumper (born 1966)

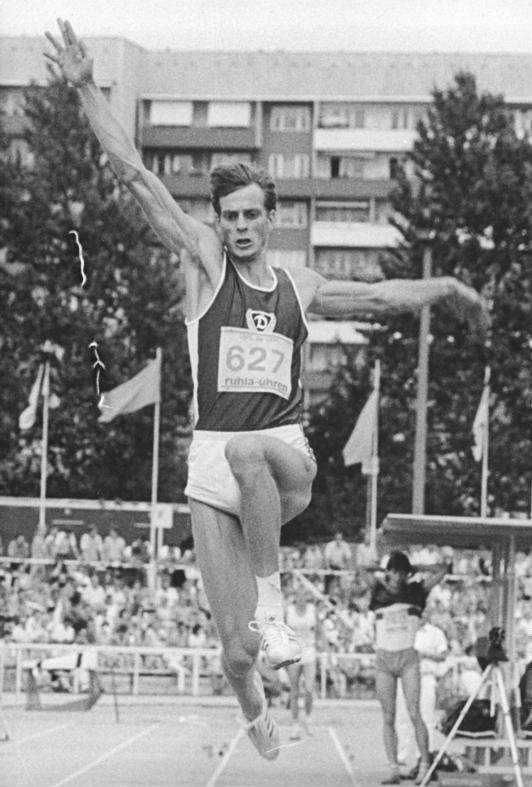
Marco Delonge.

Marco Delonge (born 16 June 1966) is a retired East German long jumper.

He won the silver medal at the 1985 European Junior Championships. He represented the sports club SC Dynamo Berlin, and became East German champion in 1987 and 1989.

His personal best jump is 8.27 metres, achieved in June 1987 in Potsdam. This ranks him fifth among German long jumpers, behind Lutz Dombrowski, Frank Paschek, Josef Schwarz and Henry Lauterbach.
