= Siegfried Valentin =

German middle-distance runner (1936–2022)

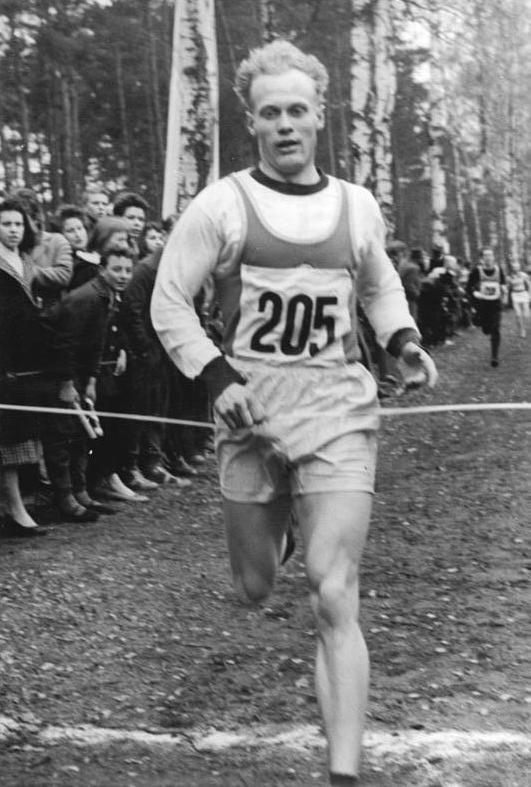
- Siegfried Valentin in 1958

Personal information
- Nationality: German
- Born: 23 February 1936 Wallwitz, Landkreis Guben, Germany
- Died: 17 December 2021 (aged 85) Potsdam, Germany

Sport
- Sport: Middle-distance running
- Event: 1500 metres

Siegfried Valentin (23 February 1936 – 17 December 2021) was a German middle-distance runner. He competed in the 1500 metres at the 1960 Summer Olympics and the 1964 Summer Olympics.
