= Fritz Kühl =

German shot putter

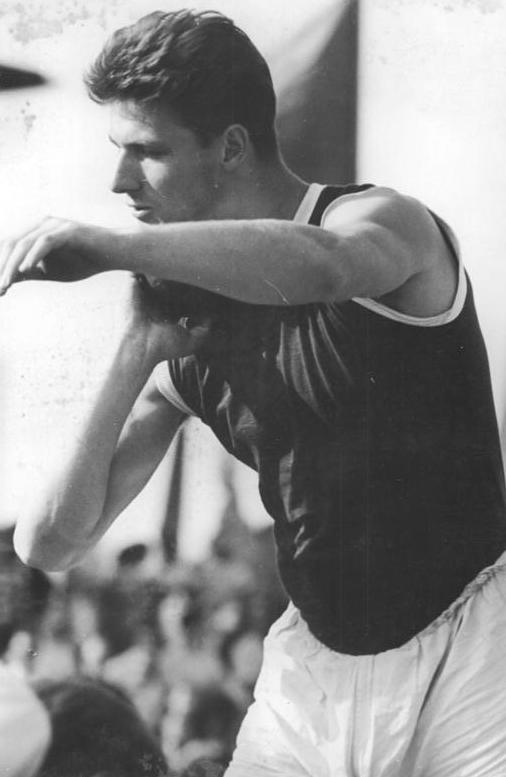
- Fritz Kühl in 1958

Personal information
- Nationality: German
- Born: 7 May 1935 (age 90)

Sport
- Sport: Athletics
- Event(s): Shot put Discus

Fritz Kühl (born 7 May 1935) is a German athlete. He competed at the 1960 Summer Olympics and the 1964 Summer Olympics.
