= Hans Fahsl =

German hammer thrower

Personal information
- Nationality: German
- Born: 15 August 1941 Duisburg, West Germany
- Died: 3 August 2017 (aged 75)

Sport
- Sport: Athletics
- Event: Hammer throw

Hans Fahsl (15 August 1941 – 3 August 2017) was a German athlete. He competed in the men's hammer throw at the 1964 Summer Olympics and the 1968 Summer Olympics.
