= Shohei Kasahara =

Japanese hammer thrower

Personal information
- Born: 21 July 1939 (age 86)

Sport
- Sport: Track and field
- Event: Hammer throw

Shohei Kasahara (笠原 章平, Kasahara Shōhei; born 21 July 1939) is a Japanese former hammer thrower who competed in the 1964 Summer Olympics.
