= Johanna Lüttge =

East German shot putter

- Lüttge in 1958

Personal information
- Born: 20 March 1936 Gebesee, Province of Saxony, Germany
- Died: 14 November 2022 (aged 86)
- Height: 1.76 m (5 ft 9 in)
- Weight: 81 kg (179 lb)

Sport
- Sport: Athletics
- Event: Shot put
- Club: SC DHfK, Leipzig
Medal record
Women's athletics
Representing Germany
Olympic Games
Silver medal – second place	1960 Rome	Shot put

Johanna Lüttge (later Hübner then Langer; 20 March 1936 – 14 November 2022) was a retired East German athlete. She competed in the shot put at the 1956, 1960 and 1964 Summer Olympics and finished in 11th, 2nd and 9th place, respectively.

She married twice, first to Mr. Hübner and later to Rudolf Langer, a German athlete who also competed in the shot put at the 1964 Olympics.
