= Axel Weber (athlete) =

East German pole vaulter

Axel Weber (19 May 1954 – 29 May 2001) was an East German pole vaulter. He won the bronze medal at the inaugural 1977 IAAF World Cup. He became East German champion in 1976, 1977, 1979, 1980 and 1981, representing the club SC Motor Jena. He also became indoor champion in 1980, 1981 and 1982. His personal best jump was 5.50 metres, achieved in May 1980 in Potsdam.
