= Henry Lauterbach =

East German athlete (born 1957)

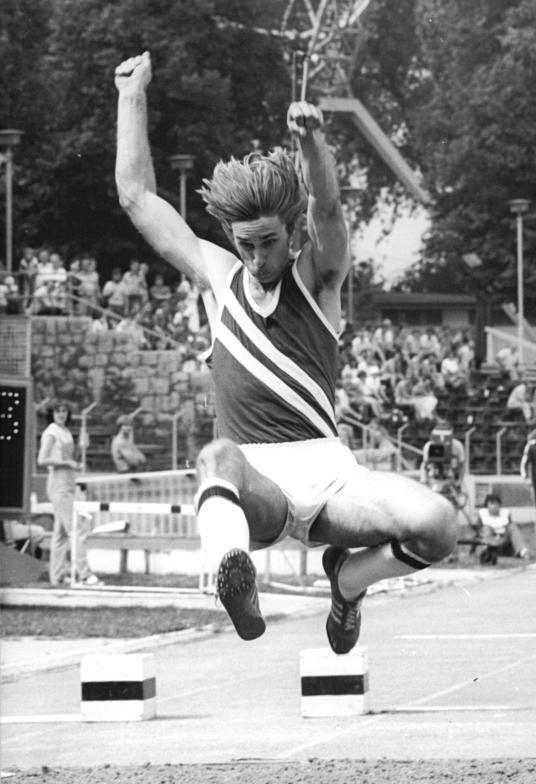

Personal information
- National team: East Germany
- Born: October 22, 1957 (age 68) Buttstädt, Bezirk Erfurt, East Germany

Sport
- Sport: Athletics
- Event(s): High jump, Long jump
- Club: SC Turbine Erfurt
- Retired: yes

Achievements and titles
- Personal best(s): High jump: 2.30 m (August 1978, Potsdam); Long jump: 8.35 m (August 1981, Erfurt)
Medal record
Men's Athletics
Representing East Germany
European Indoor Championships
Gold medal – first place	1982 Milan	Long jump

Henry Lauterbach (born 22 October 1957 in Buttstädt, Bezirk Erfurt) is a retired East German high jumper and long jumper.

In the high jump he finished fourth at the 1978 European Championships in Prague, Czechoslovakia and sixth at the 1979 European Indoor Championships in Vienna, Austria. He competed at the 1976 Olympic Games, but did not reach the final round; at the 1980 Olympic Games however he finished fourth. With a jump of 2.29 metres he missed out on the bronze medal by 2 centimetres; the bronze and gold medals were won by his compatriots Jörg Freimuth and Gerd Wessig respectively. Lauterbach was ranked sixth in the world that season by Track and Field News.

In domestic competitions, Lauterbach represented the sports club SC Turbine Erfurt. He won silver medals at the East German championships in 1976, 1977, 1978 and 1980 and a bronze medal in 1981. The East German champion during those years was usually Rolf Beilschmidt. Lauterbach became East German indoor champion in 1979.

Lauterbach had a personal best high jump of 2.30 metres, achieved in August 1978 in Potsdam.

Lauterbach also competed in the long jump on an international level, winning the gold medal at the 1982 European Indoor Championships in Milan, Italy. His winning result of 7.86 metres has been improved in all of the later editions of the European Indoor Championships. On the national level Lauterbach won silver medals in this event at the East German championships in 1970, 1972, 1976 and 1981. Additionally he won a bronze medal in 1974. He became East German indoor champion in 1982.

His personal best long jump was 8.35 metres, achieved in August 1981 in Erfurt. This ranks him third among German long jumpers, behind Olympic medalists Lutz Dombrowski and Frank Paschek, and equal to Josef Schwarz.
