= Peter Laufer (athlete) =

German pole vaulter

Personal information
- Nationality: German
- Born: 13 September 1936 Breslau, Germany
- Died: 4 March 2016 (aged 79)

Sport
- Sport: Athletics
- Event: Pole vault

Peter Laufer (13 September 1936 – 4 March 2016) was a German athlete. He competed in the men's pole vault at the 1960 Summer Olympics.
