= Manfred Losch =

German hammer thrower

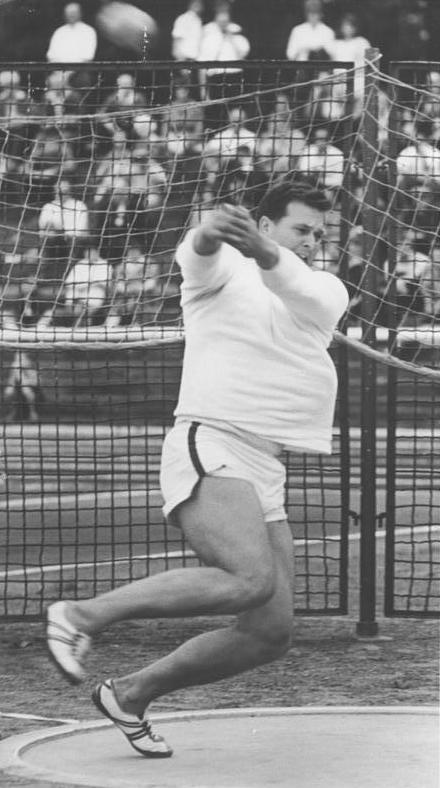
- Manfred Losch in 1964

Personal information
- Nationality: German
- Born: 27 December 1938 Angermünde, Germany
- Died: 1 November 2009 (aged 70) Schkeuditz, Germany

Sport
- Sport: Athletics
- Event: Hammer throw

Manfred Losch (27 December 1938 – 1 November 2009) was a German athlete. He competed in the men's hammer throw at the 1960 Summer Olympics.
