= Martin Lotz =

German hammer thrower

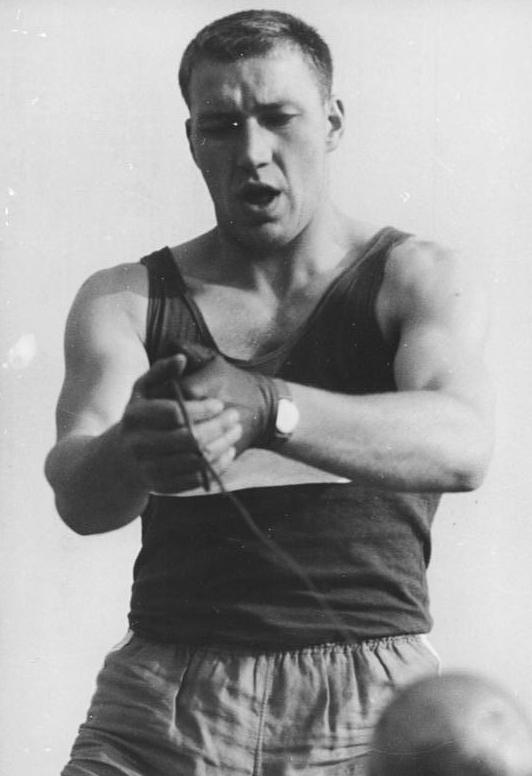
- Lotz in 1962

Personal information
- Nationality: German
- Born: 28 May 1938 (age 88) Benshausen, Germany

Sport
- Sport: Athletics
- Event: Hammer throw

Martin Lotz (born 28 May 1938) is a German former athlete. He competed in the men's hammer throw at the 1964 Summer Olympics.
