= Frank Paschek =

East German long jumper

Personal information
- Born: 25 June 1956 (age 70) Bad Doberan, East Germany
Medal record
Men's athletics
Representing East Germany
Olympic Games
Silver medal – second place	1980 Moscow	Long jump

Frank Paschek (born 25 June 1956) is a retired East German long jumper.

He was born in Bad Doberan, Bezirk Rostock, and won a silver medal for East Germany at the 1980 Summer Olympics held in Moscow, Soviet Union.

His personal best jump was 8.36 metres, achieved in May 1980 in Berlin. This ranks him fourth among German long jumpers, behind Lutz Dombrowski, Christian Reif and Sebastian Bayer.
