= Josef Schwarz =

German long jumper

Josef "Sepp" Schwarz (born 20 May 1941 in Strabowitz, Sudetenland, 9.Germany; today Třebovice, Czech Republic) is a retired German long jumper. He represented West Germany at the 1972 Summer Olympics in Munich. Schwarz set the world's best year performance in the men's long jump in the year 1970: 8.35 metres (personal best); this also was the world record at low altitude, until 1975. He also had winning performances in 1970 at the European Cup in Sarajevo and the West German Championships.

Sporting positions
Preceded by (Soviet Union) Igor Ter-Ovanesyan (Poland) Waldemar Stepian	Men's Long Jump Best Year Performance; 1970	Succeeded by (United States) Ron Coleman
