= Lutz Dombrowski =

East German long jumper

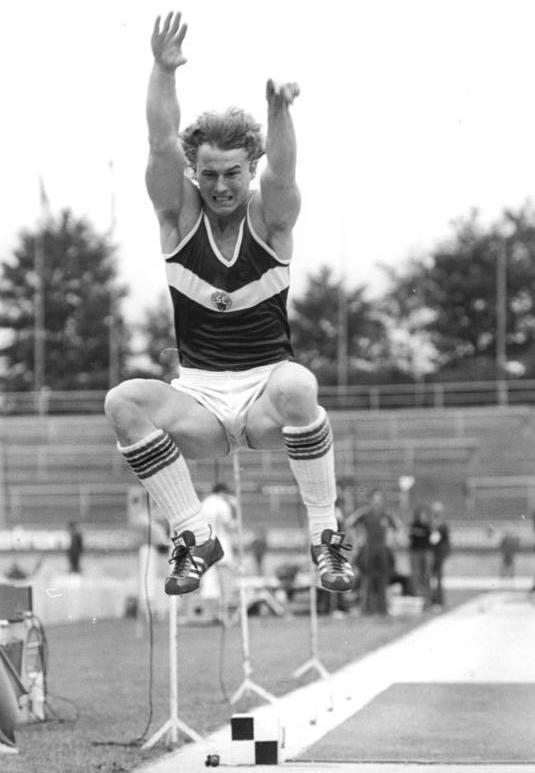

Medal record

Men's athletics

Representing East Germany

Olympic Games
Gold medal – first place	1980 Moscow	Long jump

European Championships
Gold medal – first place	1982 Athens	Long jump

Lutz Dombrowski (born 25 June 1959) is a former German track and field athlete and Olympic champion.

== Early life ==
Dombrowski was born in 1959 in Zwickau. Wilhelm Pieck, who at the time of Dombrowski's birth was president of East Germany, was his god-father; he was Pieck's second god-child after Hannelore Anke.

== Career ==
Dombrowski was the best-ever long jumper from the former East Germany. After winning at the European cup in 1979 he won the gold medal at the 1980 Summer Olympic games in Moscow. In 1982, he was European champion. He represented the Karl-Marx-Stadt sport club. His 8.54 meter winning jump in Moscow was a low-altitude record and still stands as the German national record. At the time, it was the second best jump in history behind Bob Beamon's world record of 8.90 set in 1968.

Today he is employed as a sports teacher and works as a representative of the sports society in Schwäbisch Gmünd. On 10 April 2003, he was inducted into Germany's track and field "Hall of Fame".

During his career he was 1.87 meters tall and weighed 87 kilograms. In 1991, researcher Brigitte Berendonk found doctoral theses recording state run doping in the GDR. Among the list of doped athletes was the name of Dombrowski.

Sporting positions
Preceded by (United States) Larry Myricks	Men's Long Jump Best Year Performance; 1980	Succeeded by (United States) Carl Lewis
