= 1971 European Athletics Championships – Men's hammer throw =

Men's hammer throw at the European Athletics Championships

The men's hammer throw at the 1971 European Athletics Championships was held in Helsinki, Finland, at Helsinki Olympic Stadium on 13 and 14 August 1971.

== Medalists ==
Gold	Uwe Beyer; West Germany
Silver	Reinhard Theimer; East Germany
Bronze	Anatoliy Bondarchuk; Soviet Union

== Results ==
=== Final ===
14 August

Rank	Name	Nationality	Result	Notes
1st place, gold medalist(s)	Uwe Beyer	West Germany	72.36	
2nd place, silver medalist(s)	Reinhard Theimer	East Germany	71.80	
3rd place, bronze medalist(s)	Anatoliy Bondarchuk	Soviet Union	71.40	
4	Romuald Klim	Soviet Union	70.64	
5	Walter Schmidt	West Germany	70.54	
6	Sándor Eckschmiedt	Hungary	69.74	
7	Jochen Sachse	East Germany	69.74	
8	Stanisław Lubiejewski	Poland	67.50	
9	Vasiliy Khmelevskiy	Soviet Union	67.00	
10	Mario Vecchiato	Italy	66.96	
11	Gyula Zsivótzky	Hungary	64.94	
	Lutz Caspers	West Germany	NM	

=== Qualification ===
13 August

Rank	Name	Nationality	Result	Notes
1	Gyula Zsivótzky	Hungary	71.58	Q
2	Reinhard Theimer	East Germany	71.44	Q
3	Sándor Eckschmiedt	Hungary	69.98	Q
4	Anatoliy Bondarchuk	Soviet Union	69.42	Q
5	Vasiliy Khmelevskiy	Soviet Union	68.32	Q
6	Jochen Sachse	East Germany	68.24	Q
7	Romuald Klim	Soviet Union	67.90	Q
8	Lutz Caspers	West Germany	67.02	Q
9	Uwe Beyer	West Germany	66.98	Q
10	Walter Schmidt	West Germany	66.90	Q
11	Stanisław Lubiejewski	Poland	66.18	Q
12	Mario Vecchiato	Italy	66.02	Q
13	István Encsi	Hungary	65.96	
14	Ernst Ammann	Switzerland	65.74	
15	Howard Payne	Great Britain	65.54	
16	Jacques Accambray	France	65.50	
17	Srećko Štiglić	Yugoslavia	65.14	
18	Risto Miettinen	Finland	64.12	
19	Vladimir Prikhodko	France	63.48	
20	Sune Blomqvist	Sweden	62.68	
21	Hans Pötsch	Austria	62.60	
22	Barry Williams	Great Britain	60.56	
	Carlos Sustelo	Portugal	NM	

== Participation ==
According to an unofficial count, 23 athletes from 14 countries participated in the event.

- Austria (1)
- East Germany (2)
- Finland (1)
- France (2)
- Hungary (3)
- Italy (1)
- Poland (1)
- Portugal (1)
- Soviet Union (3)
- Sweden (1)
- Switzerland (1)
- Great Britain (2)
- West Germany (3)
- Yugoslavia (1)
