= Athletics at the 1972 Summer Olympics – Men's hammer throw =

Men's hammer throw at the Games of the XX Olympiad
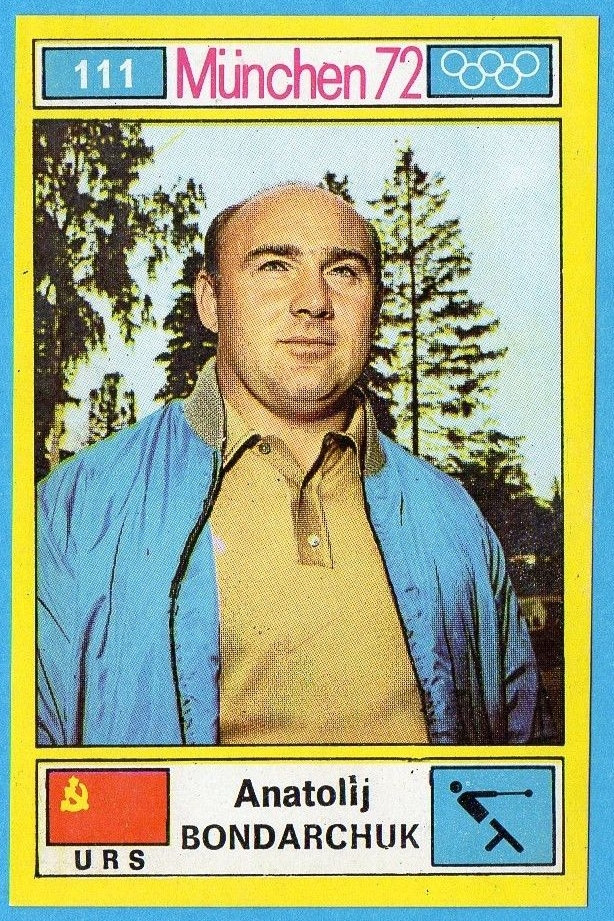
- Card depicting Anatoliy Bondarchuk
- Venue: Olympic Stadium
- Dates: September 4 & 7, 1972
- Competitors: 31 from 17 nations
- Winning distance: 75.50 OR

Medalists
1st place, gold medalist(s)		Anatoliy Bondarchuk; Soviet Union
2nd place, silver medalist(s)		Jochen Sachse; East Germany
3rd place, bronze medalist(s)		Vasiliy Khmelevskiy; Soviet Union

The men's hammer throw field event at the 1972 Summer Olympics took place on September 4 & 7. There were 31 competitors from 17 nations. The maximum number of athletes per nation had been set at 3 since the 1930 Olympic Congress. The event was won by Anatoliy Bondarchuk of the Soviet Union, the nation's third victory in the men's hammer throw. Fellow Soviet Vasiliy Khmelevskiy took bronze. Silver went to Jochen Sachse of East Germany, the nation's first medal in the event. The Soviet Union's medal streak in the event extended to five Games, while Hungary's ended after three Games (three-time medalist Gyula Zsivótzky finished fifth this time).

== Background ==
This was the 16th appearance of the event, which has been held at every Summer Olympics except 1896. Six of the 13 finalists from the 1968 Games returned: gold medalist (and 1960 and 1964 silver medalist) Gyula Zsivótzky of Hungary, fourth-place finisher (who lost the bronze on a tie-breaker) Takeo Sugawara of Japan, fifth-place finisher (and 1964 finalist) Sándor Eckschmiedt of Hungary, seventh-place finisher Reinhard Theimer of East Germany, tenth-place finisher Howard Payne of Great Britain, and thirteenth-place finisher Yoshihisa Ishida of Japan. Anatoliy Bondarchuk of the Soviet Union was the 1969 European Champion and the favorite in the event.

Bulgaria and Uruguay each made their debut in the event. The United States appeared for the 16th time, the only nation to have competed at each appearance of the event to that point.

== Competition format ==
The competition used the two-round format introduced in 1936, with the qualifying round completely separate from the divided final. In qualifying, each athlete received three attempts; those recording a mark of at least 66.00 metres advanced to the final. If fewer than 12 athletes achieved that distance, the top 12 would advance. The results of the qualifying round were then ignored. Finalists received three throws each, with the top eight competitors receiving an additional three attempts. The best distance among those six throws counted.

== Records ==
Prior to this competition, the existing world and Olympic records were as follows:

World record	Walter Schmidt (FRG)	76.40	Lahr, Germany	4 September 1971
Olympic record	Gyula Zsivótzky (HUN)	73.36	Mexico City, Mexico	17 October 1968

Anatoliy Bondarchuk's first throw of the final went 75.50 metres for a new Olympic record; nobody was able to better it. The other two medalists, Jochen Sachse and Vasiliy Khmelevskiy, beat the old record but not Bondarchuk's new one.

== Schedule ==
All times are Central European Time (UTC+1)

Date	Time	Round
Monday, 4 September 1972	10:30	Qualifying
Thursday, 7 September 1972	14:00	Final

== Results ==
All throwers reaching 66.00 m (216 ft 6 1/2 in) and the top 12 including ties advanced to the finals. All qualifiers are shown in blue. All distances are listed in metres.

=== Qualifying ===
Rank	Athlete	Nation	Group	1	2	3	Distance	Notes
1	Anatoliy Bondarchuk	Soviet Union	B	72.88	—	—	72.88	Q
2	Gyula Zsivótzky	Hungary	B	71.20	—	—	71.20	Q
3	Reinhard Theimer	East Germany	A	70.66	—	—	70.66	Q
4	Vasiliy Khmelevskiy	Soviet Union	A	70.00	—	—	70.00	Q
5	Jochen Sachse	East Germany	B	69.94	—	—	69.94	Q
6	Strećko Štiglić	Yugoslavia	A	65.52	69.60	—	69.60	Q
7	Tom Gage	United States	B	65.32	65.14	69.40	69.40	Q
8	Mario Vecchiato	Italy	A	68.12	—	—	68.12	Q
9	Jacques Accambray	France	B	68.00	—	—	68.00	Q
10	Karl-Hans Riehm	West Germany	A	64.44	67.64	—	67.64	Q
11	István Encsi	Hungary	A	67.38	—	—	67.38	Q
12	Shigenobu Murofushi	Japan	B	65.94	67.26	—	67.26	Q
13	Stavros Moutaftsidis	Greece	A	67.22	—	—	67.22	Q
14	Edwin Klein	West Germany	A	67.14	—	—	67.14	Q
15	Uwe Beyer	West Germany	B	67.04	—	—	67.04	Q
16	Peter Sternad	Austria	B	X	66.74	—	66.74	Q
17	Iosyp Hamskiy	Soviet Union	B	X	X	66.72	66.72	Q
18	Takeo Sugawara	Japan	A	65.94	64.56	66.50	66.50	Q
19	Sándor Eckschmiedt	Hungary	B	66.44	—	—	66.44	Q
20	Barry Williams	Great Britain	A	X	66.32	—	66.32	Q
21	Todor Manolov	Bulgaria	B	X	X	65.62	65.62	
22	Al Schoterman	United States	A	65.18	63.74	64.06	65.18	
23	Stanisław Lubiejewski	Poland	A	60.34	64.80	X	64.80	
24	Howard Payne	Great Britain	B	63.58	64.56	64.10	64.56	
25	Yoshihisa Ishida	Japan	B	63.00	63.82	X	63.82	
26	Georgios Georgiadis	Greece	B	63.58	X	X	63.58	
27	George Frenn	United States	A	57.28	62.14	58.86	62.14	
28	William Silen	Puerto Rico	B	X	X	62.02	62.02	
29	Vladimir Prikhodko	France	A	60.80	61.78	59.58	61.78	
30	José Alberto Vallejo	Argentina	B	X	60.08	X	60.08	
31	Darwin Piñeyrúa	Uruguay	A	59.84	X	58.50	59.84	
—	Jorge Nuñez	Mexico	B	DNS				

=== Final ===
Rank	Athlete	Nation	1	2	3	4	5	6	Distance	Notes
1st place, gold medalist(s)	Anatoliy Bondarchuk	Soviet Union	75.50 OR	72.62	71.76	73.78	73.50	72.90	75.50	OR
2nd place, silver medalist(s)	Jochen Sachse	East Germany	71.54	X	73.70	71.26	X	74.96	74.96	
3rd place, bronze medalist(s)	Vasiliy Khmelevskiy	Soviet Union	68.82	71.62	74.04	68.16	X	X	74.04	
4	Uwe Beyer	West Germany	70.32	71.52	X	68.98	69.90	X	71.52	
5	Gyula Zsivótzky	Hungary	71.38	70.44	70.48	X	70.66	70.20	71.38	
6	Sándor Eckschmiedt	Hungary	71.20	X	67.26	69.24	67.90	68.86	71.20	
7	Edwin Klein	West Germany	71.14	X	X	69.70	70.26	X	71.14	
8	Shigenobu Murofushi	Japan	69.36	70.88	70.32	65.70	69.08	68.54	70.88	
9	Mario Vecchiato	Italy	X	69.46	70.58	Did not advance			70.58	
10	Karl-Hans Riehm	West Germany	70.12	68.98	69.44	Did not advance			70.12	
11	István Encsi	Hungary	66.32	69.82	70.06	Did not advance			70.06	
12	Tom Gage	United States	66.94	69.50	X	Did not advance			69.50	
13	Reinhard Theimer	East Germany	X	69.16	X	Did not advance			69.16	
14	Strećko Štiglić	Yugoslavia	67.60	68.34	67.60	Did not advance			68.34	
15	Stavros Moutaftsidis	Greece	68.14	68.30	67.04	Did not advance			68.30	
16	Barry Williams	Great Britain	68.18	66.56	X	Did not advance			68.18	
17	Peter Sternad	Austria	65.60	65.94	66.64	Did not advance			66.64	
18	Iosyp Hamskiy	Soviet Union	66.26	X	65.34	Did not advance			66.26	
19	Jacques Accambray	France	X	65.06	X	Did not advance			65.06	
20	Takeo Sugawara	Japan	55.82	64.56	64.70	Did not advance			64.70	
