= Athletics at the 1964 Summer Olympics – Men's hammer throw =

Men's hammer throw at the Games of the XVIII Olympiad
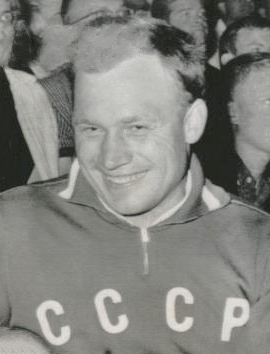
- Romuald Klim
- Venue: Olympic Stadium
- Dates: 17–18 October 1964
- Competitors: 24 from 13 nations
- Winning distance: 69.74 OR

Medalists
1st place, gold medalist(s)		Romuald Klim; Soviet Union
2nd place, silver medalist(s)		Gyula Zsivótzky; Hungary
3rd place, bronze medalist(s)		Uwe Beyer; United Team of Germany

Official Video Highlights @52:50 Video on YouTube

The men's hammer throw was one of four men's throwing events on the Athletics at the 1964 Summer Olympics program in Tokyo. It was held on 17 October and 18 October 1964, with the qualification on the first day and the final the next. 25 athletes from 14 nations entered, with 1 not starting in the qualification round. The maximum number of athletes per nation had been set at 3 since the 1930 Olympic Congress. The event was won by Romuald Klim of the Soviet Union, the nation's second consecutive victory in the men's hammer throw. Gyula Zsivótzky of Hungary repeated as silver medalist, the fifth man to win multiple medals in the event. Uwe Beyer took bronze, the first medal for the United Team of Germany and the first medal for any German hammer thrower since 1952.

== Background ==
This was the 14th appearance of the event, which has been held at every Summer Olympics except 1896. Nine of the 15 finalists from the 1960 Games returned: silver medalist Gyula Zsivótzky of Hungary, bronze medalist (and 1956 finalist) Tadeusz Rut of Poland, fourth-place finisher John Lawlor of Ireland, fifth-place finisher Olgierd Ciepły of Poland, eighth-place finisher (and 1956 gold medalist) Hal Connolly of the United States, ninth-place finisher Heinrich Thun of Austria, tenth-place finisher Yuriy Nikulin of the Soviet Union, thirteenth-place finisher Noboru Okamoto of Japan, and fourteenth-place finisher (and 1956 finalist) Albert Hall of the United States. Zsivótzky and Soviet Romuald Klim were favored.

No nations made their debut in the event. The United States appeared for the 14th time, the only nation to have competed at each appearance of the event to that point.

== Competition format ==
The competition used the two-round format introduced in 1936, with the qualifying round completely separate from the divided final. In qualifying, each athlete received three attempts; those recording a mark of at least 63.00 metres advanced to the final. If fewer than 12 athletes achieved that distance, the top 12 would advance. The results of the qualifying round were then ignored. Finalists received three throws each, with the top six competitors receiving an additional three attempts. The best distance among those six throws counted.

== Records ==
Prior to this competition, the existing world and Olympic records were as follows:

World record	Hal Connolly (USA)	70.67	Palo Alto, United States	21 July 1962
Olympic record	Vasily Rudenkov (URS)	67.10	Rome, Italy	3 September 1960

Romuald Klim matched the Olympic record of 67.10 metres in his qualifying throw; Hal Connolly bettered it with 67.40 metres in his before Gyula Zsivótzky had the best throw of the round at 67.99 metres to take the record going into the final.

Zsivótzky broke his own record with his first throw in the final, reaching 69.09 metres. That record held until Klim's fourth throw, which went 69.74 metres for a new Olympic record. Uwe Beyer and Yuriy Nikulin also beat the old record, but never held the record as their throws came after better ones by Zsivótzky.

== Schedule ==
All times are Japan Standard Time (UTC+9)

Date	Time	Round
Saturday, 17 October 1964	10:00	Qualifying
Sunday, 18 October 1964	13:00	Final

== Results ==
=== Qualifying ===
The qualification standard was 63.00 metres. Each thrower had three attempts to reach that standard.

Rank	Athlete	Nation	1	2	3	Distance	Notes
1	Gyula Zsivótzky	Hungary	67.99 OR	—	—	67.99	Q, OR
2	Hal Connolly	United States	67.40 OR	—	—	67.40	Q
3	Romuald Klim	Soviet Union	67.10 =OR	—	—	67.10	Q
4	Zdzisław Smoliński	Poland	66.00	—	—	66.00	Q
5	Yuriy Nikulin	Soviet Union	65.64	—	—	65.64	Q
6	Tadeusz Rut	Poland	65.03	—	—	65.03	Q
7	Uwe Beyer	United Team of Germany	65.01	—	—	65.01	Q
8	Ed Burke	United States	62.23	64.94	—	64.94	Q
9	Heinrich Thun	Austria	64.73	—	—	64.73	Q
10	Sándor Eckschmiedt	Hungary	64.64	—	—	64.64	Q
11	Albert Hall	United States	64.31	—	—	64.31	Q
12	Yuriy Bakarinov	Soviet Union	63.86	—	—	63.86	Q
13	Takeo Sugawara	Japan	63.84	—	—	63.84	Q
14	Olgierd Ciepły	Poland	X	63.66	—	63.66	Q
15	Josef Matoušek	Czechoslovakia	59.61	63.53	—	63.53	Q
16	Hans Fahsl	United Team of Germany	58.90	X	62.35	62.35	
17	Howard Payne	Great Britain	61.90	X	61.74	61.90	
18	Martin Lotz	United Team of Germany	60.97	61.88	58.66	61.88	
19	Shohei Kasahara	Japan	56.38	61.87	X	61.87	
20	Noboru Okamoto	Japan	58.99	60.78	61.51	61.51	
21	Karl Birger Asplund	Sweden	60.60	61.15	60.91	61.15	
22	Guy Husson	France	60.04	59.86	X	60.04	
23	John Lawlor	Ireland	X	58.22	59.12	59.12	
24	Im Dong-sil	South Korea	X	53.71	56.43	56.43	
—	Nicolae Murafa	Romania	DNS				

=== Final ===
Zsivótzky threw 69.09 in the first throw, beating his own Olympic record from the qualifier. Klim's fourth throw overtook that record and held for the gold medal distance.

Rank	Athlete	Nation	1	2	3	4	5	6	Distance	Notes
1st place, gold medalist(s)	Romuald Klim	Soviet Union	67.19	64.64	68.59	69.74 OR	68.81	68.17	69.74	OR
2nd place, silver medalist(s)	Gyula Zsivótzky	Hungary	69.09 OR	66.20	68.47	67.41	67.85	67.32	69.09	
3rd place, bronze medalist(s)	Uwe Beyer	United Team of Germany	68.09	65.64	62.91	X	65.71	X	68.09	
4	Yuriy Nikulin	Soviet Union	67.08	67.01	67.69	X	X	65.61	67.69	
5	Yuriy Bakarinov	Soviet Union	65.91	66.50	65.39	65.25	66.72	X	66.72	
6	Hal Connolly	United States	X	62.95	66.65	X	64.73	X	66.65	
7	Ed Burke	United States	65.66	65.06	62.68	Did not advance			65.66	
8	Olgierd Ciepły	Poland	64.83	X	X	Did not advance			64.83	
9	Josef Matoušek	Czechoslovakia	64.49	64.59	63.29	Did not advance			64.59	
10	Tadeusz Rut	Poland	61.03	61.94	64.52	Did not advance			64.52	
11	Sándor Eckschmiedt	Hungary	63.83	63.19	X	Did not advance			63.83	
12	Albert Hall	United States	59.72	62.35	63.82	Did not advance			63.82	
13	Takeo Sugawara	Japan	X	62.66	63.69	Did not advance			63.69	
14	Zdzisław Smoliński	Poland	X	X	62.90	Did not advance			62.90	
15	Heinrich Thun	Austria	62.76	62.42	X	Did not advance			62.76	
