= 1969 European Athletics Championships – Men's hammer throw =

Men's hammer throw at the European Athletics Championships

The men's hammer throw at the 1969 European Athletics Championships was held in Athens, Greece, at Georgios Karaiskakis Stadium on 19 and 20 September 1969.

== Medalists ==
Gold	Anatoliy Bondarchuk; Soviet Union
Silver	Romuald Klim; Soviet Union
Bronze	Reinhard Theimer; East Germany

== Results ==
=== Final ===
20 September

Rank	Name	Nationality	Result	Notes
1st place, gold medalist(s)	Anatoliy Bondarchuk	Soviet Union	74.68	WR
2nd place, silver medalist(s)	Romuald Klim	Soviet Union	72.74	
3rd place, bronze medalist(s)	Reinhard Theimer	East Germany	72.02	
4	Gyula Zsivótzky	Hungary	69.68	
5	Jochen Sachse	East Germany	68.60	
6	Lázár Lovász	Hungary	66.90	
7	Sándor Eckschmiedt	Hungary	66.02	
8	Howard Payne	Great Britain	65.90	
9	Kauko Harlos	Finland	65.16	
10	Johann Pötsch	Austria	64.00	
11	Dimitar Mindov	Bulgaria	61.48	
12	Lars-Inge Ström	Sweden	61.44	

=== Qualification ===
19 September

Rank	Name	Nationality	Result	Notes
1	Reinhard Theimer	East Germany	71.06	CR Q
2	Gyula Zsivótzky	Hungary	69.98	Q
3	Anatoliy Bondarchuk	Soviet Union	69.06	Q
4	Romuald Klim	Soviet Union	68.50	Q
5	Lázár Lovász	Hungary	66.86	Q
6	Jochen Sachse	East Germany	66.72	Q
7	Sándor Eckschmiedt	Hungary	66.68	Q
8	Kauko Harlos	Finland	64.74	Q
9	Howard Payne	Great Britain	64.58	Q
10	Johann Pötsch	Austria	63.20	Q
11	Lars-Inge Ström	Sweden	62.70	Q
12	Dimitar Mindov	Bulgaria	62.08	Q
13	Georgios Babaniotis	Greece	61.98	
14	Ernst Ammann	Switzerland	60.88	
15	Jacques Accambray	France	60.76	
16	Carlos Sustelo	Portugal	60.54	
17	Stanisław Lubiejewski	Poland	59.50	
18	Gérard Chadefaux	France	59.42	
19	Erlendur Valdimarsson	Iceland	51.04	

== Participation ==
According to an unofficial count, 19 athletes from 14 countries participated in the event.

- Austria (1)
- Bulgaria (1)
- East Germany (2)
- Finland (1)
- France (2)
- Greece (1)
- Hungary (3)
- Iceland (1)
- Poland (1)
- Portugal (1)
- Soviet Union (2)
- Sweden (1)
- Switzerland (1)
- Great Britain (1)
