= Athletics at the 1973 Summer Universiade – Men's hammer throw =

The men's hammer throw event at the 1973 Summer Universiade was held at the Central Lenin Stadium in Moscow on 20 August.

== Results ==
Rank	Athlete	Nationality	Result	Notes
1st place, gold medalist(s)	Valentin Dmitriyenko	Soviet Union	72.42	
2nd place, silver medalist(s)	Aleksey Spiridonov	Soviet Union	71.82	
3rd place, bronze medalist(s)	Uwe Beyer	West Germany	71.18	
4	Jacques Accambray	France	68.40	
5	Edwin Klein	West Germany	67.90	
6	Manfred Seidel	East Germany	67.66	
7	Ian Chipchase	Great Britain	65.84	
8	Peter Stiefenhofer	Switzerland	61.52	
9	Orlando Barbolini	Italy	60.72	
9	Dimitar Mindov	Bulgaria	60.72	
11	Boris Djerassi	United States	59.98	
12	Murray Keating	Canada	59.88	
13	Ted Bregar	United States	58.74	
