= Athletics at the 1968 Summer Olympics – Men's hammer throw =

Men's hammer throw at the Games of the XIX Olympiad
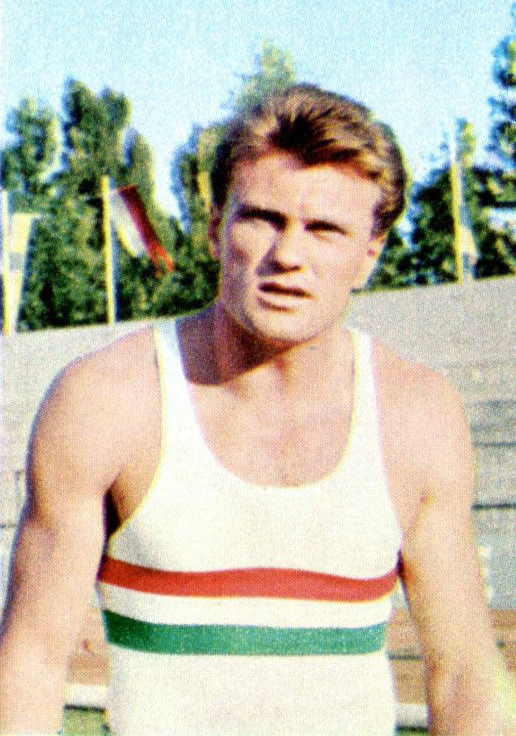
- Gyula Zsivótzky (1967)
- Venue: Estadio Olímpico Universitario
- Dates: October 16–17, 1968
- Competitors: 22 from 12 nations
- Winning distance: 73.36 OR

Medalists
1st place, gold medalist(s)		Gyula Zsivótzky; Hungary
2nd place, silver medalist(s)		Romuald Klim; Soviet Union
3rd place, bronze medalist(s)		Lázár Lovász; Hungary

The men's hammer throw competition at the 1968 Summer Olympics in Mexico City, Mexico took place on October 16–17. There were 22 competitors from 12 nations. The maximum number of athletes per nation had been set at 3 since the 1930 Olympic Congress. The event was won by Gyula Zsivótzky of Hungary, who had taken silver in both 1960 and 1964; he was the third man to win three medals in the hammer throw (after John Flanagan and Matt McGrath. Zsivótzky defeated defending champion Romuald Klim of the Soviet Union, who earned silver this time to become the sixth man to win multiple medals in the event. Bronze went to Lázár Lovász of Hungary.

The winning margin was 8 cm which as of 2023 remains the only time the men's hammer throw was won by less than 10 cm at the Olympics.

== Background ==
This was the 15th appearance of the event, which has been held at every Summer Olympics except 1896. Eight of the 15 finalists from the 1964 Games returned: gold medalist Romuald Klim of the Soviet Union, two-time silver medalist Gyula Zsivótzky of Hungary, bronze medalist Uwe Beyer of the United Team of Germany (now competing for West Germany), sixth-place finisher (and 1956 gold medalist and 1960 finalist) Hal Connolly of the United States, seventh-place finisher Ed Burke of the United States, eleventh-place finisher Sándor Eckschmiedt of Hungary, twelfth-place finisher (and 1956 and 1960 finalist) Albert Hall of the United States, and thirteenth-place finisher Takeo Sugawara of Japan. Klim and Zsivótzky had been favored in 1964; they were favored again in 1968. Zsivótzky had the best throw of the pair, a world record 73.76 metres, but Klim had won nine straight head-to-head matchups between the two.

El Salvador and Nicaragua each made their debut in the event; East and West Germany both competed separately for the first time. The United States appeared for the 15th time, the only nation to have competed at each appearance of the event to that point.

== Competition format ==
The competition consisted of two rounds, qualification and final. Each athlete received three throws in the qualifying round. All who achieved the qualifying distance of 66.00 metres progressed to the final. If fewer than twelve athletes achieved this mark, then the twelve furthest throwing athletes would reach the final. Each finalist was allowed three throws in last round, with the top eight athletes after that point being given three further attempts.

== Records ==
Prior to the competition, the existing world and Olympic records were as follows.

World record	Gyula Zsivótzky (HUN)	73.76	Budapest, Hungary	14 September 1968
Olympic record	Romuald Klim (URS)	69.74	Tokyo, Japan	18 October 1964

For the second straight Games, Gyula Zsivótzky led the qualifying round with an Olympic record throw, this time of 72.60 metres. In the final, Romuald Klim beat that record with a fourth throw of 73.28 metres to take the lead. Zsivótzky was able to answer on the fifth throw with 73.36 metres to finish with the gold medal and a new Olympic record. Lázár Lovász and Takeo Sugawara each threw 69.78 metres in the final to make four men in total surpassing the old record (but after Zsivótzky's better throw in the qualifying round, so neither ever held the record).

== Schedule ==
All times are Central Standard Time (UTC-6)

Date	Time	Round
Wednesday, 16 October 1968	10:00	Qualifying
Thursday, 17 October 1968	15:00	Final

== Results ==
=== Qualifying ===
Qual. rule: qualification standard 66.00m (Q) or at least best 12 qualified (q). Hall and Connolly, both finalists in each of the last three Games, each missed the qualifying mark.

Rank	Group	Athlete	Nation	1	2	3	Distance	Notes
1	A	Gyula Zsivótzky	Hungary	72.60 OR	—	—	72.60	Q, OR
2	A	Lázár Lovász	Hungary	68.96	—	—	68.96	Q
3	B	Sándor Eckschmiedt	Hungary	68.60	—	—	68.60	Q
4	A	Helmuth Baumann	East Germany	68.24	—	—	68.24	Q
5	A	Reinhard Theimer	East Germany	65.78	68.12	—	68.12	Q
6	B	Howard Payne	Great Britain	65.52	64.80	68.06	68.06	Q
7	A	Hans Fahsl	West Germany	65.80	67.90	—	67.90	Q
8	A	Takeo Sugawara	Japan	67.76	—	—	67.76	Q
9	A	Gennadiy Kondrashov	Soviet Union	67.56	—	—	67.56	Q
10	A	Ed Burke	United States	67.36	—	—	67.36	Q
11	B	Yoshihisa Ishida	Japan	67.16	—	—	67.16	Q
12	A	Romuald Klim	Soviet Union	66.82	—	—	66.82	Q
13	A	Anatoly Shchuplyakov	Soviet Union	64.78	66.56	—	66.56	Q
14	B	Al Hall	United States	X	65.70	58.28	65.70	
15	B	Lutz Caspers	West Germany	X	65.54	64.70	65.54	
16	A	Uwe Beyer	West Germany	65.02	64.88	65.44	65.44	
17	B	Hal Connolly	United States	X	X	65.00	65.00	
18	B	José Luis Martínez	Spain	60.60	63.40	62.84	63.40	
19	B	Ernst Ammann	Switzerland	X	61.48	62.40	62.40	
20	B	Praveen Kumar	India	X	59.80	60.84	60.84	
21	B	Gustavo Morales	Nicaragua	X	43.88	45.76	45.76	
22	B	Carlos Hasbún	El Salvador	X	37.02	37.46	37.46	
	B	Frangiskos Politis	Greece				DNS	

=== Final ===
The tie between Lovász and Sugawara was broken by their second-best throws.

Rank	Athlete	Nation	1	2	3	4	5	6	Distance	Notes
1st place, gold medalist(s)	Gyula Zsivótzky	Hungary	72.26	72.46	72.54	X	73.36 OR	72.22	73.36	OR
2nd place, silver medalist(s)	Romuald Klim	Soviet Union	72.24	68.96	72.82	73.28 OR	71.16	71.64	73.28	
3rd place, bronze medalist(s)	Lázár Lovász	Hungary	64.76	X	69.78	X	69.38	X	69.78	2nd best 69.38
4	Takeo Sugawara	Japan	67.24	68.12	X	69.06	69.78	61.40	69.78	2nd best 69.06
5	Sándor Eckschmiedt	Hungary	67.84	68.50	69.46	X	67.64	68.08	69.46	
6	Gennadiy Kondrashov	Soviet Union	69.08	67.00	68.64	67.10	67.98	67.70	69.08	
7	Reinhard Theimer	East Germany	68.82	X	66.16	68.84	67.86	63.54	68.84	
8	Helmuth Baumann	East Germany	65.94	66.98	68.26	X	63.76	X	68.26	
9	Anatoly Shchuplyakov	Soviet Union	67.58	67.74	66.90	Did not advance			67.74	
10	Howard Payne	Great Britain	65.98	67.62	66.58	Did not advance			67.62	
11	Hans Fahsl	West Germany	X	64.00	66.36	Did not advance			66.36	
12	Ed Burke	United States	X	65.72	65.46	Did not advance			65.72	
13	Yoshihisa Ishida	Japan	65.04	63.72	X	Did not advance			65.04	
