= Athletics at the 1965 Summer Universiade – Men's hammer throw =

The men's hammer throw event at the 1965 Summer Universiade was held at the People's Stadium in Budapest on 27 and 28 August 1965.

== Medalists ==
Gold	Silver	Bronze
Gyula Zsivótzky; Hungary	Gennadiy Kondrashov; Soviet Union	Yuriy Bakarinov; Soviet Union

== Results ==
=== Qualification ===
Rank	Group	Name	Nationality	Result	Notes
1	?	Gyula Zsivótzky	Hungary	68.56	Q
2	?	Gennadiy Kondrashov	Soviet Union	60.86	Q
3	?	Sándor Eckschmiedt	Hungary	58.68	Q
4	?	Piotr Gaździk	Poland	57.80	Q
5	?	José Luis Martínez	Spain	55.86	Q
6	?	Shigenobu Murofushi	Japan	55.84	Q
7	?	Ernst Ammann	Switzerland	54.92	Q
7	?	Lawrie Bryce	Great Britain	54.92	Q
9	?	Koji Oshita	Japan	54.90	Q
10	?	Yuriy Bakarinov	Soviet Union	54.52	Q
11	?	Martin Šebesta	Czechoslovakia	54.38	Q
12	?	Vladimir Prikhodko	France	53.42	Q
13	?	Todor Markov	Bulgaria	52.92	Q
14	?	Bruce Fraser	Great Britain	52.20	Q
15	?	Heinz Zaunschirm	Austria	51.58	Q
16	?	Lars-Inge Ström	Sweden	50.98	Q
17	?	Heinrich Liewald	West Germany	50.22	Q
18	?	Bernard Vovau	France	49.30	

=== Final ===
Rank	Name	Nationality	Result	Notes
1st place, gold medalist(s)	Gyula Zsivótzky	Hungary	67.74	
2nd place, silver medalist(s)	Gennadiy Kondrashov	Soviet Union	65.76	
3rd place, bronze medalist(s)	Yuriy Bakarinov	Soviet Union	63.74	
4	Sándor Eckschmiedt	Hungary	61.04	
5	Koji Oshita	Japan	60.86	
6	Shigenobu Murofushi	Japan	59.70	
7	Vladimir Prikhodko	France	57.72	
8	Piotr Gaździk	Poland	57.06	
9	Lawrie Bryce	Great Britain	55.26	
10	Bruce Fraser	Great Britain	54.76	
11	Ernst Ammann	Switzerland	54.60	
12	José Luis Martínez	Spain	54.36	
13	Martin Šebesta	Czechoslovakia	53.74	
14	Heinrich Liewald	West Germany	52.98	
15	Lars-Inge Ström	Sweden	52.90	
16	Todor Markov	Bulgaria	51.12	
17	Heinz Zaunschirm	Austria	49.08	
