= Athletics at the 1960 Summer Olympics – Men's hammer throw =

Men's hammer throw at the Games of the XVII Olympiad
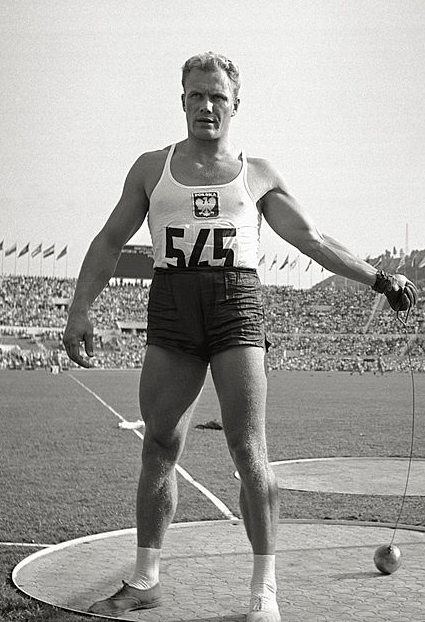
- Bronze medalist Tadeusz Rut
- Venue: Stadio Olimpico
- Dates: September 2, 1960 (qualifying); September 3, 1960 (final)
- Competitors: 28 from 18 nations
- Winning distance: 67.10 OR

Medalists
1st place, gold medalist(s)		Vasily Rudenkov; Soviet Union
2nd place, silver medalist(s)		Gyula Zsivótzky; Hungary
3rd place, bronze medalist(s)		Tadeusz Rut; Poland

The men's hammer throw at the 1960 Summer Olympics took place on September 2 (qualifying) and September 3 (final) at the Stadio Olimpico. The qualifying standards for the 1960 event were 60 m (196 ft 10 in). There were 28 competitors from 18 nations. The maximum number of athletes per nation had been set at 3 since the 1930 Olympic Congress. The event was won by Vasily Rudenkov of the Soviet Union, the nation's first victory in the event. Gyula Zsivótzky took silver, Hungary's fourth medal in the last four Games in the men's hammer throw. Tadeusz Rut's bronze was Poland's first medal in the event.

== Background ==
This was the 13th appearance of the event, which has been held at every Summer Olympics except 1896. Ten of the 15 finalists from the 1956 Games returned: gold medalist Hal Connolly of the United States, bronze medalist Anatoli Samotsvetov of the Soviet Union, fourth-place finisher Albert Hall of the United States, fifth-place finisher (and 1952 gold medalist) József Csermák of Hungary, sixth-place finisher Krešimir Račić of Yugoslavia, eighth-place finisher (and 1952 finalist) Sverre Strandli of Norway, eleventh-place finisher Muhammad Iqbal of Pakistan, thirteenth-place finisher Guy Husson of France, fourteenth-place finisher Tadeusz Rut of Poland, and Birger Asplund of Sweden, who did not make a legal mark in the final. Vasily Rudenkov of the Soviet Union was the favorite over defending champion Connolly.

Portugal and Spain each made their debut in the event; East and West Germany competed together as the United Team of Germany for the first time. The United States appeared for the 13th time, the only nation to have competed at each appearance of the event to that point.

== Competition format ==
The competition used the two-round format introduced in 1936, with the qualifying round completely separate from the divided final. In qualifying, each athlete received three attempts; those recording a mark of at least 60.00 metres advanced to the final. If fewer than 12 athletes achieved that distance, the top 12 would advance. The results of the qualifying round were then ignored. Finalists received three throws each, with the top six competitors receiving an additional three attempts. The best distance among those six throws counted.

== Records ==
Prior to this competition, the existing world and Olympic records were as follows:

World record	Hal Connolly (USA)	70.33	Walnut, United States	20 June 1960
Olympic record	Hal Connolly (USA)	63.19	Melbourne, Australia	24 November 1956

The Olympic record was beaten by Gyula Zsivótzky in the qualifying round with a distance of 64.80 metres. Vasily Rudenkov bettered that with a distance of 67.03 metres. Anatoli Samotsvetov was better than the old record, but behind Rudenkov's new record.

In the final, Rudenkov bettered his own new record with 67.10 metres on his third throw. The top nine men in the final threw further than Connolly's old record, including Connolly himself (who finished eighth despite improving by 40 centimetres).

== Schedule ==
All times are Central European Time (UTC+1)

Date	Time	Round
Friday, 2 September 1960	10:15	Qualifying
Saturday, 3 September 1960	16:00	Final

== Results ==
=== Qualifying round ===
Throwers achieving 60.00 metres advanced to the final.

Rank	Order	Athlete	Nation	1	2	3	Distance	Notes
1	26	Vasily Rudenkov	Soviet Union	67.03 OR	—	—	67.03	Q, OR
2	6	Gyula Zsivótzky	Hungary	64.80 OR	—	—	64.80	Q
3	27	Anatoli Samotsvetov	Soviet Union	64.67	—	—	64.67	Q
4	13	Michael Ellis	Great Britain	63.21	—	—	63.21	Q
5	11	Hal Connolly	United States	63.02	—	—	63.02	Q
6	9	Heinrich Thun	Austria	62.73	—	—	62.73	Q
7	22	John Lawlor	Ireland	X	62.10	—	62.10	Q
8	24	Noboru Okamoto	Japan	X	X	61.95	61.95	Q
9	12	Sverre Strandli	Norway	58.67	61.41	—	61.41	Q
10	8	Antun Bezjak	Yugoslavia	60.90	—	—	60.90	Q
11	21	Muhammad Iqbal	Pakistan	57.84	60.86	—	60.86	Q
12	7	Albert Hall	United States	57.43	X	60.76	60.76	Q
13	2	Tadeusz Rut	Poland	60.73	—	—	60.73	Q
14	25	Olgierd Ciepły	Poland	60.61	—	—	60.61	Q
15	15	Yuriy Nikulin	Soviet Union	60.40	—	—	60.40	Q
16	28	Guy Husson	France	59.31	X	59.83	59.83	
17	17	Claus Peter	United Team of Germany	X	59.83	X	59.83	
18	10	József Csermák	Hungary	X	X	62.73	59.72	
19	20	Ed Bagdonas	United States	X	59.48	X	59.48	
20	5	Manfred Losch	United Team of Germany	X	58.85	59.38	59.38	
21	3	Takeo Sugawara	Japan	58.40	59.32	57.66	59.32	
22	29	Hansruedi Jost	Switzerland	55.09	57.07	59.12	59.12	
23	19	Siegfried Lorenz	United Team of Germany	X	59.06	X	59.06	
24	16	Birger Asplund	Sweden	57.27	X	X	57.27	
24	18	Krešimir Račić	Yugoslavia	57.27	X	X	57.27	
26	14	José Luis Falcón	Spain	51.26	57.24	X	57.24	
27	23	Andreas Kouvelogiannis	Greece	53.43	X	55.18	55.18	
28	1	Eduardo Albuquerque	Portugal	53.26	54.31	54.92	54.92	
—	4	Erman Bastian	India	DNS				

=== Final ===
The six highest-ranked competitors after three rounds qualified for the final three throws to decide the medals.

Rank	Athlete	Nation	1	2	3	4	5	6	Distance	Notes
1st place, gold medalist(s)	Vasily Rudenkov	Soviet Union	65.60	64.98	67.10 OR	66.62	64.58	66.23	67.10	OR
2nd place, silver medalist(s)	Gyula Zsivótzky	Hungary	60.83	63.83	64.87	65.79	X	65.11	65.79	
3rd place, bronze medalist(s)	Tadeusz Rut	Poland	64.51	65.64	64.95	X	64.85	63.54	65.64	
4	John Lawlor	Ireland	X	62.59	64.09	64.95	X	X	64.95	
5	Olgierd Ciepły	Poland	60.03	64.07	62.27	64.57	62.48	62.06	64.57	
6	Antun Bezjak	Yugoslavia	61.96	64.21	63.54	63.95	62.86	X	64.21	
7	Anatoli Samotsvetov	Soviet Union	X	63.60	X	Did not advance			63.60	
8	Hal Connolly	United States	63.05	62.57	63.59	Did not advance			63.59	
9	Heinrich Thun	Austria	62.23	X	63.53	Did not advance			63.53	
10	Yuriy Nikulin	Soviet Union	61.56	63.10	62.23	Did not advance			63.10	
11	Sverre Strandli	Norway	X	62.02	63.05	Did not advance			63.05	
12	Muhammad Iqbal	Pakistan	60.55	61.79	60.80	Did not advance			61.79	
13	Noboru Okamoto	Japan	X	60.08	X	Did not advance			60.08	
14	Albert Hall	United States	59.64	X	59.76	Did not advance			59.76	
15	Michael Ellis	Great Britain	X	54.22	X	Did not advance			54.22	
