= Athletics at the 1976 Summer Olympics – Men's hammer throw =

Men's hammer throw at the Games of the XXI Olympiad
- Pictogram for athletics
- Venue: Olympic Stadium
- Dates: 26–28 July 1976
- Competitors: 20 from 13 nations
- Winning distance: 77.52 OR

Medalists
1st place, gold medalist(s)		Yuriy Sedykh; Soviet Union
2nd place, silver medalist(s)		Aleksey Spiridonov; Soviet Union
3rd place, bronze medalist(s)		Anatoliy Bondarchuk; Soviet Union

The men's hammer throw competition at the 1976 Summer Olympics in Montreal, Quebec, Canada took place on 26–28 July. There were 20 competitors from 13 nations. The maximum number of athletes per nation had been set at 3 since the 1930 Olympic Congress. The event was won by Yuriy Sedykh of the Soviet Union, the nation's second consecutive and fourth overall victory in the men's hammer throw (moving out of a tie with Hungary into sole possession of second-most all-time after the United States' seven). The Soviets swept the medals, with Aleksey Spiridonov taking silver and defending champion Anatoliy Bondarchuk earning bronze. It was the third medal sweep in the men's hammer throw (the United States had done it in 1900 and 1904). Bondarchuk was the seventh man to win multiple medals in the event.

== Background ==
This was the 17th appearance of the event, which has been held at every Summer Olympics except 1896. Seven of the 20 finalists from the 1972 Games returned: gold medalist Anatoliy Bondarchuk of the Soviet Union, silver medalist Jochen Sachse of East Germany, seventh-place finisher Edwin Klein of West Germany, eighth-place finisher Shigenobu Murofushi of Japan, tenth-place finisher Karl-Hans Riehm of West Germany, seventeenth-place finisher Peter Sternad of Austria, and nineteenth-place finisher Jacques Accambray of France. The Soviets and West Germans were favored, particularly Yuriy Sedykh and Karl-Hans Riehm.

New Zealand made its debut in the event. The United States appeared for the 17th time, the only nation to have competed at each appearance of the event to that point.

== Competition format ==
The competition consisted of two rounds, qualification and final. Each athlete received three throws in the qualifying round. All who achieved the qualifying distance of 69.00 metres progressed to the final. If fewer than twelve athletes achieved this mark, then the twelve furthest throwing athletes would reach the final. Each finalist was allowed three throws in last round, with the top eight athletes after that point being given three further attempts.

== Records ==
Prior to the competition, the existing world and Olympic records were as follows.

World record	Walter Schmidt (FRG)	79.30	Frankfurt, West Germany	14 August 1975
Olympic record	Anatoliy Bondarchuk (URS)	75.50	Munich, West Germany	7 September 1972

Yuriy Sedykh broke the Olympic record with his second throw of the final, at 77.52 metres. That throw was unbeaten through the rest of the competition. Aleksey Spiridonov also (but later) bettered the old record, with 76.08 metres; Anatoliy Bondarchuk's best throw was 2 centimetres short of his own old record.

== Schedule ==
All times are Eastern Daylight Time (UTC-4)

Date	Time	Round
Monday, 26 July 1976	10:00	Qualifying
Wednesday, 28 July 1976	14:00	Final

== Results ==
=== Qualifying ===
Qual. rule: qualification standard 69.00m (Q) or at least best 12 qualified (q).

Rank	Group	Athlete	Nation	1	2	3	Distance	Notes
1	A	Karl-Hans Riehm	West Germany	74.46	—	—	74.46	Q
2	A	Yuriy Sedykh	Soviet Union	71.46	—	—	71.46	Q
3	A	Anatoliy Bondarchuk	Soviet Union	71.08	—	—	71.08	Q
4	A	Manfred Seidel	East Germany	70.84	—	—	70.84	Q
5	A	Walter Schmidt	West Germany	70.76	—	—	70.76	Q
6	B	Chris Black	Great Britain	70.76	—	—	70.76	Q
7	B	Jacques Accambray	France	70.72	—	—	70.72	Q
8	A	Aleksey Spiridonov	Soviet Union	70.64	—	—	70.64	Q
9	A	Jochen Sachse	East Germany	X	70.64	—	70.64	Q
10	A	Peter Farmer	Australia	67.50	68.94	69.92	69.92	Q
11	B	Shigenobu Murofushi	Japan	66.22	68.84	68.24	68.84	q
12	A	Edwin Klein	West Germany	68.68	68.36	68.72	68.72	q
13	B	Giampaolo Urlando	Italy	X	66.18	68.54	68.54	
14	A	Paul Dickenson	Great Britain	67.52	X	68.52	68.52	
15	B	Larry Hart	United States	67.74	65.74	X	67.74	
16	B	Murray Cheater	New Zealand	66.30	67.38	X	67.38	
17	B	Edoardo Podberscek	Italy	66.56	66.28	X	66.56	
18	B	Peter Sternad	Austria	65.80	66.08	66.14	66.14	
19	B	Murray Keating	Canada	65.00	65.28	65.68	65.68	
20	B	Kleanthis Ierissiotis	Greece	65.50	X	X	65.50	

=== Final ===
Rank	Athlete	Nation	1	2	3	4	5	6	Distance	Notes
1st place, gold medalist(s)	Yuriy Sedykh	Soviet Union	75.64	77.52 OR	X	X	75.58	76.40	77.52	OR
2nd place, silver medalist(s)	Aleksey Spiridonov	Soviet Union	75.74	73.94	75.28	75.60	X	76.08	76.08	
3rd place, bronze medalist(s)	Anatoliy Bondarchuk	Soviet Union	75.48	X	74.64	74.16	X	75.46	75.48	
4	Karl-Hans Riehm	West Germany	75.00	73.08	X	75.46	75.42	74.62	75.46	
5	Walter Schmidt	West Germany	72.58	74.72	74.36	73.52	74.72	72.42	74.72	
6	Jochen Sachse	East Germany	71.90	72.84	72.80	73.14	74.30	73.70	74.30	
7	Chris Black	Great Britain	70.56	72.38	73.18	X	69.54	X	73.18	
8	Edwin Klein	West Germany	68.14	70.52	70.32	70.36	69.76	71.34	71.34	
9	Jacques Accambray	France	X	67.52	70.44	Did not advance			70.44	
10	Manfred Seidel	East Germany	69.66	X	70.02	Did not advance			70.02	
11	Shigenobu Murofushi	Japan	X	68.62	68.88	Did not advance			68.88	
12	Peter Farmer	Australia	67.98	67.92	68.00	Did not advance			68.00	
