= 1974 European Athletics Championships – Men's hammer throw =

Sport

Men's hammer throw at the European Athletics Championships

The men's hammer throw at the 1974 European Athletics Championships was held in Rome, Italy, at Stadio Olimpico on 6 and 7 September 1974.

== Medalists ==
Gold	Aleksey Spiridonov; Soviet Union
Silver	Jochen Sachse; East Germany
Bronze	Reinhard Theimer; East Germany

== Results ==
=== Final ===
7 September

Rank	Name	Nationality	Result	Notes
1st place, gold medalist(s)	Aleksey Spiridonov	Soviet Union	74.20	
2nd place, silver medalist(s)	Jochen Sachse	East Germany	74.00	
3rd place, bronze medalist(s)	Reinhard Theimer	East Germany	71.62	
4	Valentin Dmitrenko	Soviet Union	71.18	
5	Uwe Beyer	West Germany	71.04	
6	Manfred Hüning	West Germany	70.58	
7	Heikki Kangas	Finland	70.04	
8	István Encsi	Hungary	68.50	
9	Edwin Klein	West Germany	68.48	
10	Ian Chipchase	Great Britain	68.44	
11	Karl-Heinz Beilig	East Germany	67.82	
12	Chris Black	Great Britain	65.54	
13	Szymon Jagliński	Poland	65.52	

=== Qualification ===
6 September

Rank	Name	Nationality	Result	Notes
1	Aleksey Spiridonov	Soviet Union	72.36	Q
2	Jochen Sachse	East Germany	72.32	Q
3	Heikki Kangas	Finland	70.84	Q
4	Reinhard Theimer	East Germany	70.64	Q
5	Manfred Hüning	West Germany	70.10	Q
6	Valentin Dmitrenko	Soviet Union	69.76	Q
7	Edwin Klein	West Germany	69.38	Q
8	Ian Chipchase	Great Britain	69.28	Q
9	Karl-Heinz Beilig	East Germany	69.14	Q
10	István Encsi	Hungary	69.06	Q
11	Chris Black	Great Britain	69.04	Q
12	Uwe Beyer	West Germany	68.48	Q
13	Szymon Jagliński	Poland	68.46	Q
14	Peter Stiefenhofer	Switzerland	67.76	
15	Howard Payne	Great Britain	67.44	
16	Anatoliy Bondarchuk	Soviet Union	66.62	
17	Peter Sternad	Austria	66.44	
18	Jaroslav Charvát	Czechoslovakia	65.54	
19	Faustino de Boni	Italy	65.12	
20	Jacques Accambray	France	64.98	
21	Josef Hájek	Czechoslovakia	64.80	
22	Daniel Mikolajczyk	France	62.12	
	Georgios Babaniotis	Greece	DNS	

== Participation ==
According to an unofficial count, 22 athletes from 12 countries participated in the event.

- Austria (1)
- Czechoslovakia (2)
- East Germany (3)
- Finland (1)
- France (2)
- Hungary (1)
- Italy (1)
- Poland (1)
- Soviet Union (3)
- Switzerland (1)
- Great Britain (3)
- West Germany (3)
