= Athletics at the 1970 Summer Universiade – Men's hammer throw =

The men's hammer throw event at the 1970 Summer Universiade was held at the Stadio Comunale in Turin on 4 September 1970.

== Records ==
Standing records prior to the 1970 Summer Universiade
World record	Anatoliy Bondarchuk (URS)	75.48	Rovno, Soviet Union	12 October 1969
Universiade record	Gyula Zsivótzky (HUN)	67.74	Budapest, Hungary	August 1965

== Results ==
Rank	Athlete	Nationality	Result	Notes
1st place, gold medalist(s)	Jochen Sachse	East Germany	72.34	UR
2nd place, silver medalist(s)	Vasiliy Khmelevskiy	Soviet Union	68.54	
3rd place, bronze medalist(s)	Vladimir Ambrosyev	Soviet Union	66.80	
4	Shigenobu Murofushi	Japan	66.48	
5	Walter Schmidt	East Germany	64.70	
6	Mario Vecchiato	Italy	64.02	
7	José Alcantara	Spain	62.86	
8	Dimitar Mindov	Bulgaria	62.30	
9	Walter Bernardini	Italy	60.78	
10	Eberhard Gäde	West Germany	60.38	
11	Nurullah İvak	Turkey	58.88	
12	Barry Williams	Great Britain	58.26	
13	Heimo Viertbauer	Austria	57.34	
	Alexander Gusbeth	Australia	NM	
