= Yuriy Bakarinov =

Soviet-Russian hammer thrower

Personal information
- Native name: Юрий Михайлович Бакаринов
- Full name: Yuriy Mikhailovich Bakarinov
- Nationality: Russian
- Born: 8 May 1938 Moscow, Russian SFSR, Soviet Union
- Died: 12 November 2025 (aged 87)
- Height: 169 cm (5 ft 7 in)
- Weight: 100 kg (220 lb)

Sport
- Country: Soviet Union
- Event: Hammer throw

Achievements and titles
- Personal best: HT: 69.55 m (1964)
Medal record
Men's athletics
Representing Soviet Union
European Championships
Bronze medal – third place	1962 Belgrade	Hammer throw
Summer Universiade
Bronze medal – third place	1965 Budapest	Hammer throw

Yuriy Mikhailovich Bakarinov (Russian: Юрий Михайлович Бакаринов; 8 May 1938 – 12 November 2025) was a Russian athletics coach and former hammer thrower. Representing the Soviet Union, he won bronze at the 1962 European Championships and placed fifth at the 1964 Summer Olympics.

== Biography ==
Bakarinov was born in Moscow on 8 May 1938. During the early 1960s he was one of many top Soviet hammer throwers, together with Vasily Rudenkov, Romuald Klim, Yuriy Nikulin, Gennadiy Kondrashov, Anatoliy Samotsvetov and Aleksey Baltovskiy; he was ranked in the world's top 10 for five consecutive years from 1960 to 1964, but faced strong competition for spots on the national team. In 1962 he threw 66.57 m at the European Championships in Belgrade, winning bronze behind Hungary's Gyula Zsivótzky (who set a new European record of 69.64 m) and Baltovskiy. Bakarinov's best throw that year, 68.90 m, ranked him third on the world year list and first in the Soviet Union.

Bakarinov won the Soviet championship once, in an upset in 1964; the favorites, Kondrashov and Klim, surprisingly only placed fifth and sixth. Bakarinov's winning throw, 69.55 m, was a new Soviet record and secured him a place on the Soviet team for the Olympics in Tokyo; his national record was, however, short-lived, as Klim broke it at a secondary tryout meeting two weeks later. Bakarinov placed fifth in the Olympic final, with a best throw of 66.72 m; Klim won with 69.74 m, breaking the Soviet record again. Bakarinov's results dropped slightly after 1964, though he remained in the world's top 20 on season bests for three more years; in 1965 he won bronze behind Zsivótzky and Kondrashov at the Universiade in Budapest.

Bakarinov was short for a thrower, only 169 cm (5 ft 6 1/2 in) tall, but had good speed and technique. After his throwing career he remained active in the sport as a coach, and served as the national team's throwing events coach for both the Soviet Union and Russia; he was replaced with Aleksey Malyukov in 2007 after disappointing performances from Russian throwers at the World Championships in Osaka and other major meets. Throwers personally coached by Bakarinov include Aleksey Zagorniy and Igor Astapkovich.
