= Athletics at the 1975 Summer Universiade – Men's hammer throw =

The men's hammer throw event at the 1975 Summer Universiade was held at the Stadio Olimpico in Rome on 20 September.

== Results ==
| Rank | Athlete | Nationality | #1 | #2 | #3 | #4 | #5 | #6 | Result | Notes |
|---|---|---|---|---|---|---|---|---|---|---|
| 1st place, gold medalist(s) | Aleksey Spiridonov | Soviet Union | | | 73.82 | | | | 73.82 | |
| 2nd place, silver medalist(s) | Walter Schmidt | West Germany | 72.00 | | | | | | 72.00 | |
| 3rd place, bronze medalist(s) | Yuriy Sedykh | Soviet Union | | | | | | | 71.32 | |
| 4 | Gábor Tamás | Hungary | | | | | | | 66.26 | |
| 5 | Peter Stiefenhofer | Switzerland | | | | | | | 62.66 | |
| 6 | Jacques Accambray | France | | | | | | | 59.08 | |
| 7 | Miguel Erdozaín | Spain | 53.88 | 54.90 | 52.46 | 54.00 | 56.18 | x | 56.18 | |
| 8 | Carl Shields | United States | | | | | | | 55.24 | |
| 9 | Alfonso Rodríguez | Mexico | | | | | | | 49.84 | |
