= Lubiejewski =

Lubiejewski is a Polish surname. Notable people with the surname include:

- Stanisław Lubiejewski (born 1947), Polish athlete
- Zbigniew Lubiejewski (born 1949), Polish volleyball player
- Marcin Lubiejewski (born 1981), Polish volleyball player
