= Masters M40 hammer throw world record progression =

Masters M40 hammer throw world record progression is the progression of world record improvements of the hammer throw M40 division of Masters athletics. Records must be set in properly conducted, official competitions under the standing IAAF rules unless modified by World Masters Athletics. The M40 division consists of male athletes who have reached the age of 40 but have not yet reached the age of 45, so exactly from their 40th birthday to the day before their 45th birthday. The M40 division throws exactly the same 7.257 kg implement as the Open division. These competitors all threw their records in open competition. In 1918 Matt McGrath (US) threw 53.87.

Key

Incomplete information Pending

Distance	Athlete	Nationality	Birthdate	Location	Date
82.23	Igor Astapkovich	Belarus	04.01.1963	Minsk	09.07.2004
81.35	Igor Astapkovich	Belarus	04.01.1963	Minsk	10.06.2003
80.03	Vasiliy Sidorenko	Russia	01.05.1961	Tula	14.07.2001
75.66	Yuriy Sedykh	Ukraine	11.06.1955	Dreux	29.06.1995
74.34	Ed Burke	United States	04.03.1940	Stanford	28.04.1984
70.90	Romuald Klim	Soviet Union	25.05.1933	Minsk	22.06.1973
68.42	Yuriy Nikulin	Soviet Union	08.01.1931	Moscow	30.05.1972
68.30	Harold Connolly	United States	01.08.1931	Long Beach	07.05.1972
64.70	Birger Asplund	Sweden	21.07.1929	Helsinki	05.09.1970
