= Masters M35 hammer throw world record progression =

Masters M35 hammer throw world record progression is the progression of world record improvements of the hammer throw M35 division of Masters athletics. Records must be set in properly conducted, official competitions under the standing IAAF rules unless modified by World Masters Athletics. The M35 division consists of male athletes who have reached the age of 35 but have not yet reached the age of 40, so exactly from their 35th birthday to the day before their 40th birthday. The M35 division throws exactly the same 7.257 kg implement as the Open division. These competitors all threw their records in open competition. In 1912 Matt McGrath threw 58.34.

Key

Incomplete information Pending

Distance	Athlete	Nationality	Birthdate	Location	Date
83.62	Igor Astapkovich	Belarus	04.01.1963	Stajki	20.06.1998
82.80	Yuriy Sedykh	Soviet Union	11.06.1955	Pieksämäki	12.08.1990
78.16	Giampaolo Urlando	Italy	07.01.1945	Walnut	25.07.1984
77.80	Boris Zajčuk	Soviet Union	28.08.1947	Moscow	11.06.1983
77.42	Anatolij Bondarčuk	Soviet Union	31.05.1940	Kiev	24.06.1976
72.04	Gyula Zsivótzky	Hungary	25.02.1937	Budapest	14.05.1972
70.84	Harold Connolly	United States	01.08.1931	Long Beach	20.07.1969
69.40	Guy Husson	France	02.03.1931	Aix-les-Bains	15.10.1967
66.82	Josef Matoušek	Czechoslovakia	07.09.1928	Kutná Hora	22.09.1963
