= Ian Chipchase =

British hammer thrower

Personal information
- Nationality: British (English)
- Born: 26 February 1952 (age 74) Hebburn, County Durham, England

Sport
- Sport: Athletics
- Event: hammer throw
- Club: North Shields Polytechnic; Liverpool University
Medal record
Representing England
British Commonwealth Games
Gold medal – first place	1974 Christchurch	Hammer throw

Ian Alan Chipchase (born 26 February 1952) is an English former track and field athlete who competed in the hammer throw. He was the gold medallist in the event at the 1974 British Commonwealth Games with a games' record performance. His career best was 71.00 m (232 ft 11 1/4 in), set in 1974.

He also represented England at the 1978 Commonwealth Games and Great Britain at the 1974 European Athletics Championships.

== Biography ==
Chipchase was born in Hebburn, County Durham, in the north of England. He rose to prominence at national level as a junior in 1969 when he won the English Schools Championships, AAA Junior Championships and the British Schools international match. He retained all of those titles for following year. His international championship debut came at the 1970 European Athletics Junior Championships, where he placed eighth with a mark of 57.76 m (189 ft 6 in).

His first senior hammer throw title at the North of England Athletics Championships was achieved while he was still a teenager in 1970. He would go on to take that title six times over his career. He set a British junior record of 64.14 m (210 ft 5 in) in the 1971 season. This stood for eight years until it was beaten by Martin Girvan. He continued to compete while entering higher education and was a three-time champion consecutively at the Universities Athletic Union Championships from 1971 to 1973. At the 1973 AAA Championships he placed third behind Britain's most dominant throwers and 1972 Olympians, Howard Payne and Barry Williams.

Chipchase's career peaked in the 1974 season. He was chosen to represent England at the 1974 British Commonwealth Games and held off both Howard Payne and Peter Farmer to win the gold medal. He improved the previous games record three time during the competition, ending with a best of 69.56 m (228 ft 2 1/2 in). That August he set a personal best of 71.00 m (232 ft 11 1/4 in) in Edinburgh – a mark which placed him among Britain's best ever throwers at that point, behind Barry Williams, Paul Dickenson and Chris Black. He competed at the 1974 European Athletics Championships, coming tenth in a field dominated by Soviet and German athletes.

He made only one major international appearance after 1974 – a sixth-place finish at the 1978 Commonwealth Games. He was competitive domestically until the early 1980s, and his achievements include two titles at the Inter-Counties Championships (1978, 1980) and a third place at the 1981 UK Athletics Championships.

Chipchase married Dorothy Swinyard, also an English Commonwealth Games representative.

== International competitions ==
Year	Competition	Venue	Position	Notes
1970	European Junior Championships	Colombes, France	8th	57.76
1974	British Commonwealth Games	Christchurch, New Zealand	1st	69.56 GR
1974	European Championships	Rome, Italy	10th	68.44
1978	Commonwealth Games	Edmonton, Canada	6th	64.80
