= Vasiliy Khmelevskiy =

Soviet hammer thrower

Personal information
- Native name: Васіль Уладзіміравіч Хмялеўскі
- Full name: Vasiliy Vladimirovich Khmelevskiy
- Nationality: Belarusian
- Born: 14 January 1948 Mikalaikaǔščyna, Hrodna Region, Belarusian SSR, Soviet Union
- Died: 2002 (aged 54)
- Height: 1.96 m (6 ft 5 in)
- Weight: 124 kg (273 lb)

Sport
- Country: Soviet Union
- Sport: Hammer throw
- Club: Dynamo Stavropol

Achievements and titles
- Personal best: 74.98 m (1972)
Medal record
Men's athletics
Representing the Soviet Union
Olympic Games
Bronze medal – third place	1972 Munich	Hammer throw
Universiade
Silver medal – second place	1970 Turin	Hammer throw

Vasiliy Vladimirovich Khmelevskiy (Belarusian: Васіль Уладзіміравіч Хмялеўскі, Russian: Василий Владимирович Хмелевский; 14 January 1948 – 2002) was a Soviet athlete who competed mainly in the hammer throw. He won a bronze medal at the 1972 Summer Olympics with a throw of 74.04 metres, behind compatriot Anatoly Bondarchuk (75.50 m) and Jochen Sachse of East Germany (74.96 m). He also finished in third place at the national championships in 1971 and 1972. He achieved a personal best of 74.98 meters on 8 July 1975 in Minsk.

Khmelevskiy was born and raised in Belarus, but later moved to Stavropol, Russia while serving in the Soviet Army. There he graduated from the Stavropol Pedagogical Institute. He began training in athletics in 1963 and became a member of the Soviet team in 1970. In 1972 he was awarded the Medal "For Distinguished Labour". He married a former athletics competitor, who also specialized in throwing, and took her to his native Belarus. There they raised three daughters and a son. After retirement from competitions, Khmelevskiy fell into depression and became a heavy drinker. On 30 December 1979, he set on fire, for a joke, a costumed person during a celebration in Minsk and was charged with hooliganism. He died from heart failure in 2002.
