= Masters M55 hammer throw world record progression =

Masters M55 hammer throw world record progression is the progression of world record improvements of the hammer throw M55 division of Masters athletics. Records must be set in properly conducted, official competitions under the standing IAAF rules unless modified by World Masters Athletics. The M55 division consists of male athletes who have reached the age of 55 but have not yet reached the age of 60, so exactly from their 55th birthday to the day before their 60th birthday. The M55 division throws a 6 kg implement. In 1933 Matt McGrath threw the 16-Lb HT 45.82 and then 45.98 (This is before masters specifications existed).

Key

Incomplete information Pending

Distance	Athlete	Nationality	Birthdate	Location	Date
63.70	Hans Pötsch	Austria	20.03.1933	Budapest	05.07.1990
60.26	Bob Backus	United States	11.07.1926		02.08.1981
58.78	Josef Matoušek	Czechoslovakia	07.09.1928	Prostějov	31.08.1985
52.28	Silvano Giovannetti	Italy	22.05.1929	Salsomaggiore	24.06.1984
