= Athletics at the 1967 Summer Universiade – Men's hammer throw =

The men's hammer throw event at the 1967 Summer Universiade was held at the National Olympic Stadium in Tokyo on 4 September 1967.

== Results ==
Rank	Name	Nationality	Result	Notes
1st place, gold medalist(s)	Yoshihisa Ishida	Japan	64.94	
2nd place, silver medalist(s)	Heiner Liewald	West Germany	62.18	
3rd place, bronze medalist(s)	Shigenobu Murofushi	Japan	61.76	
4	Lawrie Bryce	Great Britain	58.58	
5	José Luis Martínez	Spain	56.52	
6	Koo In-tae	South Korea	54.44	
7	Claude Gallien	France	50.10	
