= Siegfried Lorenz =

Siegfried Lorenz can refer to:

- Siegfried Lorenz (athlete) (born 1933), German hammer thrower
- Siegfried Lorenz (baritone) (1945–2024), German singer
- Siegfried Lorenz (politician) (born 1930), German politician
