= Murray Cheater =

New Zealand hammer thrower (1947–2020)

Personal information
- Born: 26 January 1947 Auckland, New Zealand
- Died: 4 August 2020 (aged 73) Rotorua, New Zealand
- Height: 1.78 m (5 ft 10 in)
- Weight: 100 kg (220 lb)

Sport
- Sport: Athletics
- Event: Hammer throw
- Club: Papatoetoe Athletic Club; Rotorua Athletic Club; Lake City Athletic Club

Achievements and titles
- National finals: Hammer throw champion (1974, 1975, 1976, 1977, 1978, 1979, 1981, 1982, 1983, 1984)
- Personal best: 71.20 m (233 ft 7 in)

Murray Spencer Cheater (26 January 1947 – 4 August 2020) was a New Zealand hammer thrower who represented his country at the 1976 Summer Olympics.

== Biography ==
Born in Auckland on 26 January 1947, Cheater was the son of Robert Walter Cheater and Joycene Verona Cheater (née Clarke). His father later served as president of Athletics Auckland between 1964 and 1966.

Initially competing for the Papatoetoe Athletic Club, Cheater moved to Rotorua in the mid-1970s, becoming a member of the Rotorua Athletic Club, later the Lake City Athletic Club. He won the New Zealand national men's hammer throw title on ten occasions: every year from 1974 to 1984, except in 1980. He broke the New Zealand record for the event 16 times, recording his personal best of 71.20 m in January 1976.

Cheater represented New Zealand in the hammer throw at the 1974 British Commonwealth Games in Christchurch, where he finished fifth with a best throw of 65.82 m. Two years later, he competed in the men's hammer throw at the 1976 Summer Olympics, recording a best throw of 67.38 m in the qualifying round, to finish in 16th place and not progress to the final.

Cheater finished third behind Barry Williams in the hammer throw event at the British 1972 AAA Championships and third behind Chris Black at the 1976 AAA Championships.

Cheater operated a contracting business in Rotorua. He died in Rotorua on 4 August 2020.
