= Mark Thomas (sprinter) =

British sprinter (born 1965)

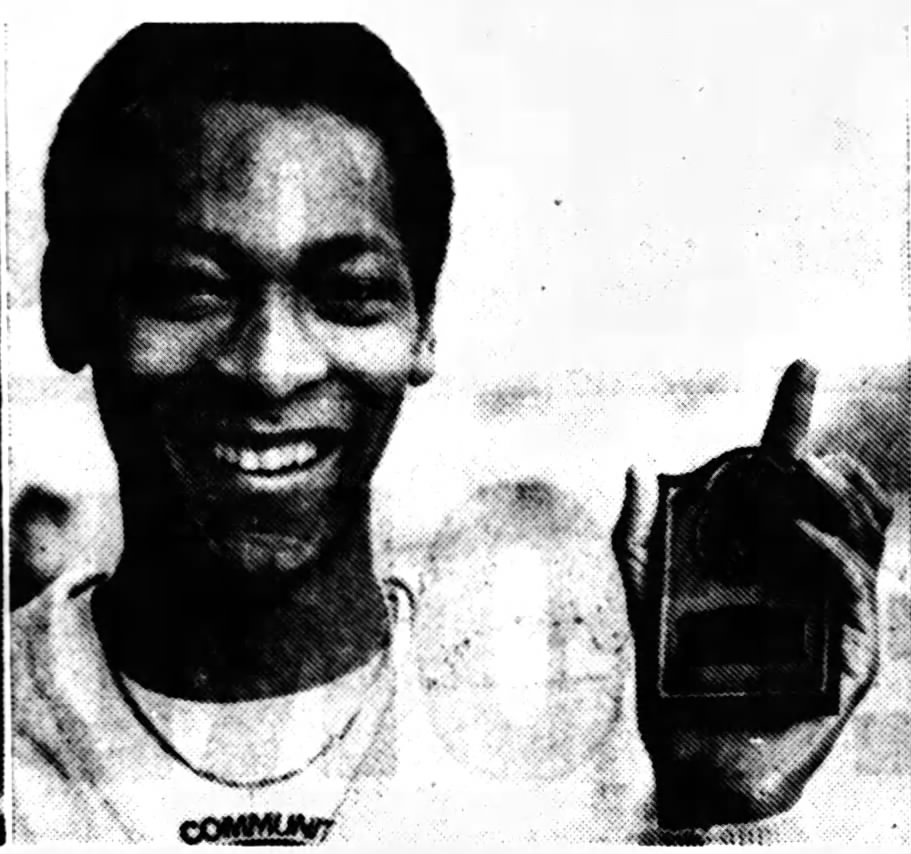
- Thomas in 1983

Personal information
- Born: 12 May 1965 (age 61) Blackburn, Lancashire, England
- Home town: Sefton Park, Toxteth, Liverpool, England
- Height: 6 ft (183 cm)

Sport
- Country: Great Britain
- Sport: Sport of athletics
- Event: 400 metres
- College team: Iowa State Cyclones
- Club: Liverpool Harriers; Birchfield Harriers (since 1988)
- Coached by: Ben Laing

Achievements and titles
- National finals: 1988 AAA Indoor Championships; • 400 m, 1st (gold)
- Personal best: 400m: 45.92 (1987)
Medal record
Men's athletics
Representing the United Kingdom
World Championships
Silver medal – second place	1987 Rome	4 × 400 m relay
- Updated on November 2024

Mark Thomas (born 12 May 1965) is a British former sprinter specializing in the 400 metres. He was the 1988 AAA Indoor Championships winner in his event, and he won the silver medal representing the U.K. at the 1987 World Athletics Championships by virtue of running in the heats and semi-finals.

== Career ==
At the 1983 Midland Bank Lancashire County Championships, Thomas won the U20 100 m and finished second in the 200 m and 400 m. He was compared with Paul Dunn, silver medalist at the 1981 UK Athletics Championships. At the British U20 championships in August 1984, Thomas finished 2nd in the 400 m. He debuted in the 800 metres in September 1984, running 1:55.3.

Thomas competed at and won several international meets, including qualifying for two meets in China in 1985. Following a stint for the Iowa State Cyclones track and field team in the U.S., Thomas returned to Liverpool in 1987.

Thomas competed at his first continental championship in 1987, placing 4th in his heat at the European Indoor Championships 400 m. Later that year, Thomas was selected for the British team at the 1987 World Championships in Athletics, set to compete in the 4 × 400 m. Thomas led off his team to a heat win and runner-up position in the semi-finals, but him and Todd Bennett were both substituted out by Derek Redmond and Roger Black in the finals. Nonetheless, the team won the silver medal, making Thomas the first Liverpool Harrier to medal at the World Athletics Championships or Olympics. Thomas was disappointed at being replaced in the finals, and he was not immediately given his medal as only four were awarded at the championships.

Now representing the Birchfield Harriers, Thomas won his only British senior title at the AAA Indoor Championships in the indoor 400 m. He followed that up with another showing at the 1988 European Indoor 400 m, where he again finished 4th in his heat and did not advance.

Thomas qualified for the finals of the 1990 European Champion Clubs Cup, but he did not compete due to work obligations at the Liverpool J.M. Centre.

== Personal life ==
Thomas was born 12 May 1965 in Blackburn, Lancashire, England. He grew up in Sefton Park, Toxteth, Liverpool, England where he was a member of the Liverpool Harriers athletic club. In July 1983, he was injured in a car accident causing him to miss competition.

He did not return to full health from the accident until mid-1984. Thomas disliked travelling internationally for competitions due to the cold weather, and he spent most of his time in Liverpool.

Thomas went to college in the United States, competing for the Iowa State Cyclones track and field team. After his return to Liverpool in 1987, Thomas was known for achieving success despite not having a coach, and was labeled a "Do It Yourself Champion".

Thomas quit the Liverpool Harriers in September 1987, transferring to the Birchfield Harriers instead.

== Statistics ==
=== Personal best progression ===
400m progression
#	Mark	Pl.	Competition	Venue	Date	Ref.
1	47.9	3rd place, bronze medalist(s)		Crewe, England	18 Jun 1983	
2	46.54	2nd place, silver medalist(s)		Karlovac, Croatia	15 Sep 1984	
3	46.05				17 May 1986	
4	45.92	1st place, gold medalist(s)		Wigan, England	26 Jun 1987	
