= Athletics at the 1981 Summer Universiade – Men's hammer throw =

Hammer throw

The men's hammer throw event at the 1981 Summer Universiade was held at the Stadionul Naţional in Bucharest on 24 and 25 July 1981.

== Medalists ==
Gold	Silver	Bronze
Klaus Ploghaus; West Germany	Jüri Tamm; Soviet Union	Igor Nikulin; Soviet Union

== Results ==
=== Qualification ===
Rank	Athlete	Nationality	Result	Notes
1	Manfred Hüning	West Germany	72.16	
2	Jüri Tamm	Soviet Union	71.20	
3	Igor Nikulin	Soviet Union	70.56	
4	Nicolae Bindar	Romania	69.24	
5	Orlando Bianchini	Italy	67.50	
6	Petru Lengyel	Romania	67.24	
7	Klaus Ploghaus	West Germany	67.02	
8	Tibor Tánczi	Hungary	66.46	
9	Matthew Mileham	Great Britain	66.24	
10	Leszek Woderski	Poland	65.86	
11	Raúl Jimeno	Spain	63.90	
12	Robert Weir	Great Britain	63.60	
13	Xie Yingqi	China	63.20	
14	Daniel Obrist	Switzerland	63.14	
15	Doug Barnett	United States	59.62	
16	Luis Martínez	Puerto Rico	53.83	

=== Final ===
Rank	Athlete	Nationality	Result	Notes
1st place, gold medalist(s)	Klaus Ploghaus	West Germany	77.74	UR
2nd place, silver medalist(s)	Jüri Tamm	Soviet Union	76.54	
3rd place, bronze medalist(s)	Igor Nikulin	Soviet Union	75.24	
4	Manfred Hüning	West Germany	74.44	
5	Nicolae Bindar	Romania	73.92	
6	Leszek Woderski	Poland	71.38	
7	Petru Lengyel	Romania	68.20	
8	Orlando Bianchini	Italy	67.96	
9	Tibor Tánczi	Hungary	67.38	
10	Raúl Jimeno	Spain	65.98	
11	Matthew Mileham	Great Britain	64.70	
12	Robert Weir	Great Britain	64.56	
