= Dave Leech =

New Zealand hammer thrower

Personal information
- Full name: David Dower Leech
- Born: 9 March 1927 Christchurch, New Zealand
- Died: 21 October 2017 (aged 90) Christchurch, New Zealand
- Spouse: Pat Hastie (m. 1955)
- Children: 3

Sport
- Country: New Zealand
- Sport: Track and field

Achievements and titles
- National finals: Hammer throw champion (1952, 1962, 1964, 1965)
Medal record
Men's Masters athletics
Representing New Zealand
World Masters Athletics Championships
Bronze medal – third place	1997 Durban	M70 Hammer throw

David Dower Leech (9 March 1927 – 21 October 2017) was a New Zealand hammer thrower and athletics official. He represented his country at the 1962 British Empire and Commonwealth Games. In 1997, he won a World Masters hammer throw title in the M70 category.

== Early life and family ==
Leech was born in Christchurch on 9 March 1927. He was educated at St Bede's College, and then studied at Canterbury College and Christchurch Teachers' College, becoming a primary school teacher. He married Patricia Elizabeth Hastie in 1955, and the couple went on to have three children.

== Athletics ==
=== National competition ===
Leech won his first national hammer throw championship in 1952, with a distance of 142 ft 8 in (43.48 m). It was another 10 years before he won a second national, with a best throw of 169 ft 1/2 in (51.52 m) in 1962. He went on to win the national title on four occasions in all, with successive victories in 1964 and 1965. His best winning throw was 177 ft 6 in (54.10 m) in 1964, when he became the first New Zealander to achieve a distance of over 54 metres.

Leech held the New Zealand residents' record for the hammer throw from 1962 to 1967.

=== International competition ===
At the 1962 British Empire and Commonwealth Games in Perth, Leech represented New Zealand in the hammer throw. He finished in seventh place with a best throw of 166 ft 5 1/2 in (50.74 m).

=== Masters athletics ===
Leech went on to be active in Masters athletics. Between 1976 and 2014, he won 20 age-group titles in the hammer throw at New Zealand Masters championships, and he won a world Masters hammer throw bronze medal in the M70 category at the 1997 World Veterans Athletics Championships.

=== Management ===
At the 1974 British Commonwealth Games in Christchurch, Carr was a New Zealand's athletics section assistant manager, and two years later he was the athletics section manager for the New Zealand team at the 1976 Summer Olympics in Montreal. He received a merit award from Athletics New Zealand in 1988, and was awarded life membership of Athletics Canterbury in 1988. In 1990, Leech was awarded the New Zealand 1990 Commemoration Medal.

== Working life ==
After a period as a teacher, Leech spent the rest of his working life, from 1958 to 1992, with the New Zealand Probation Service, first as a probation officer and later as a probation manager.

== Death ==
Leech died in Christchurch on 21 October 2017. His wife, Pat, died in 2021.
