= Helmuth Baumann =

East German javelin thrower

Personal information
- Nationality: East German
- Born: 23 January 1940 (age 86) Oelsnitz, Vogtland
- Height: 181 cm (5 ft 11 in)
- Weight: 98 kg (216 lb)

Sport
- Country: East Germany
- Sport: Hammer throw

Achievements and titles
- Personal best: 69.90

Helmuth Baumann is an East German former Olympic javelin thrower. He represented his country in the men's hammer throw at the 1968 Summer Olympics. His distance was a 68.24 in the qualifiers, and a 68.26 in the finals.
