= Hansruedi Jost =

Swiss hammer thrower (1934–2016)

Personal information
- Nationality: Swiss
- Born: 29 March 1934 Aarau, Switzerland
- Died: 29 March 2016 (aged 82)

Sport
- Sport: Athletics
- Event: Hammer throw

Hansruedi Jost (29 March 1934 – 29 March 2016) was a Swiss athlete. He competed in the men's hammer throw at the 1960 Summer Olympics.
