= Anatoly Shchuplyakov =

Belarusian hammer thrower

- Shchuplyakov in 1969

Personal information
- Nationality: Belarusian
- Born: 2 August 1938 (age 88) Nizhny Novgorod, Soviet Union

Sport
- Sport: Athletics
- Event: Hammer throw

Anatoly Shchuplyakov (born 2 August 1938) is a Belarusian athlete. He competed in the men's hammer throw at the 1968 Summer Olympics, representing the Soviet Union.
