= Athletics at the 1962 British Empire and Commonwealth Games – Men's hammer throw =

Men's hammer throw at the 1962 British Empire and Commonwealth Games
- Venue: Perry Lakes Stadium
- Date: 1 December 1962
- Competitors: 9 from 4 nations
- Winning distance: 202 ft 3 in (61.65 m)

Medalists
gold medal	Howard Payne	England
silver medal	Dick Leffler	Australia
bronze medal	Robert Brown	Australia

The men's hammer throw at the 1962 British Empire and Commonwealth Games as part of the athletics programme was held at the Perry Lakes Stadium on Saturday 1 December 1962.

The event was won by Englishman Howard Payne with a throw of 202 ft 3 in (61.65 m). Payne won by 5 ft 11 1/2 in (1.82 m) ahead of the Australian pairing of Dick Leffler and Robert Brown.

== Records ==
World record	Hal Connolly (USA)	231 ft 10 1/2 in (70.68 m)	Palo Alto, California, United States	21 July 1962
Commonwealth record				
Games record	Mike Ellis (ENG)	206 ft 4 in (62.89 m)	Cardiff, Wales	27 July 1958

== Final ==
Rank	Name	Nationality	Result	Notes
1st place, gold medalist(s)	Howard Payne	England	202 ft 3 in (61.65 m)	
2nd place, silver medalist(s)	Dick Leffler	Australia	196 ft 3 1/2 in (59.83 m)	
3rd place, bronze medalist(s)	Robert Brown	Australia	189 ft 1 1/2 in (57.65 m)	
4	Charlie Morris	Australia	186 ft 3 1/2 in (56.78 m)	
=5	Laurie Hall	Wales	178 ft 6 in (54.41 m)	
=5	Mike Edwards	Australia	178 ft 6 in (54.41 m)	
7	Dave Leech	New Zealand	166 ft 5 1/2 in (50.74 m)	
	John Sheldrick	England		DNS
	John McSorley	England		DNS
