= Stavros Moutaftsidis =

Greek hammer thrower

Personal information
- Nationality: Greek
- Born: 22 November 1947
- Died: 13 March 2021 (aged 73)

Sport
- Sport: Athletics
- Event: Hammer throw

Stavros Moutaftsidis (22 November 1947 – 13 March 2021) was a Greek athlete. He competed in the men's hammer throw at the 1972 Summer Olympics.
