= Tom Farrell (hurdler) =

British hurdler (born 1932)

Personal information
- Nationality: British (English)
- Born: 23 September 1932 (age 93) Liverpool, England
- Height: 175 cm (5 ft 9 in)
- Weight: 70 kg (154 lb)

Sport
- Sport: Track and field
- Events: 400 metres hurdles; 800 metres
- Club: Liverpool Harriers & Athletics Club

Achievements and titles
- Personal bests: 400 metres hurdles: 50.98 seconds (1960); 800 metres: 1:48.0 (1960)

Thomas Stanley Farrell (born 23 September 1932) is a retired British athlete who specialised in the 400 metres hurdles and later transitioned to middle-distance running. He represented Great Britain in two Olympic Games and had a distinguished career in national and international competitions.

== Early life and education ==
Farrell attended Liverpool Collegiate School, where he initially focused on sprints and the long jump. His athletic prowess was evident early on, finishing fourth in the All England Schools Long Jump final with a leap of 20 feet 4 inches. He later shifted his focus to the quarter-mile (400 metres) event.

== Athletic career ==
Farrell was a member of the Liverpool Harriers and Athletic Club. He competed in the men's 400m metres hurdles at the 1956 Summer Olympics in Melbourne, but did not advance past the heats.

Farrell became the British 440 yards hurdles champion after winning the British AAA Championships title at the 1957 AAA Championships.

In 1958, representing the England athletics team, he participated in the 440 yards hurdles at the British Empire and Commonwealth Games in Cardiff, reaching the semi finals. That same year, he placed fourth in the 400 metres hurdles at the European Athletics Championships in Stockholm, where he also captained the team.

In 1960, Farrell transitioned to middle-distance running, focusing on the 800 metres. He won the Amateur Athletic Association (AAA) championship over 880 yards that year. At the 1960 Rome Olympics, he competed in the 800 metres, where he won his heat and advanced to the quarter final, where he finished fifth behind the eventual gold and silver medalists Peter Snell and Roger Moens.

This was also the year in which Farrell achieved his personal bests in both 400 metres hurdles (beating his own national record) and the 800 metres.

== Post-Athletic Career ==
After retiring from competitive athletics, Farrell pursued a career in education, teaching at various schools, including Quarry Bank High School and Maghull High School. He later became an ordained minister, serving as a curate at St. Peter's Church in Woolton, Liverpool. In 1972 he returned to the Olympic Games in Munich as a chaplain offering spiritual guidance to athletes.

== Publications ==
In 2011, Farrell (a first cousin of twice Booker prize winning author J.G. Farrell) authored the semi-autobiographical novel Tim Oliver Evacuee, drawing on his own experiences as a child evacuee during World War II. The work offers insights into the emotional and social upheavals faced by child evacuees during that period.

In 2018, Farrell went on to publish Evacuee’s Return a sequel to Tim Oliver Evacuee, continuing Tim Oliver’s story as he returns to war-scarred Liverpool in June 1941.

In 2021, Farrell published his autobiography, Making of an Olympian, detailing his journey from amateur athlete to Olympian, his service in the Royal Air Force, and his experiences during his athletics career. The book includes a foreword by Olympic medallist and former executive chairman of the British Athletics Federation, Peter Radford.
