= Geoff Smith (runner) =

British long-distance runner

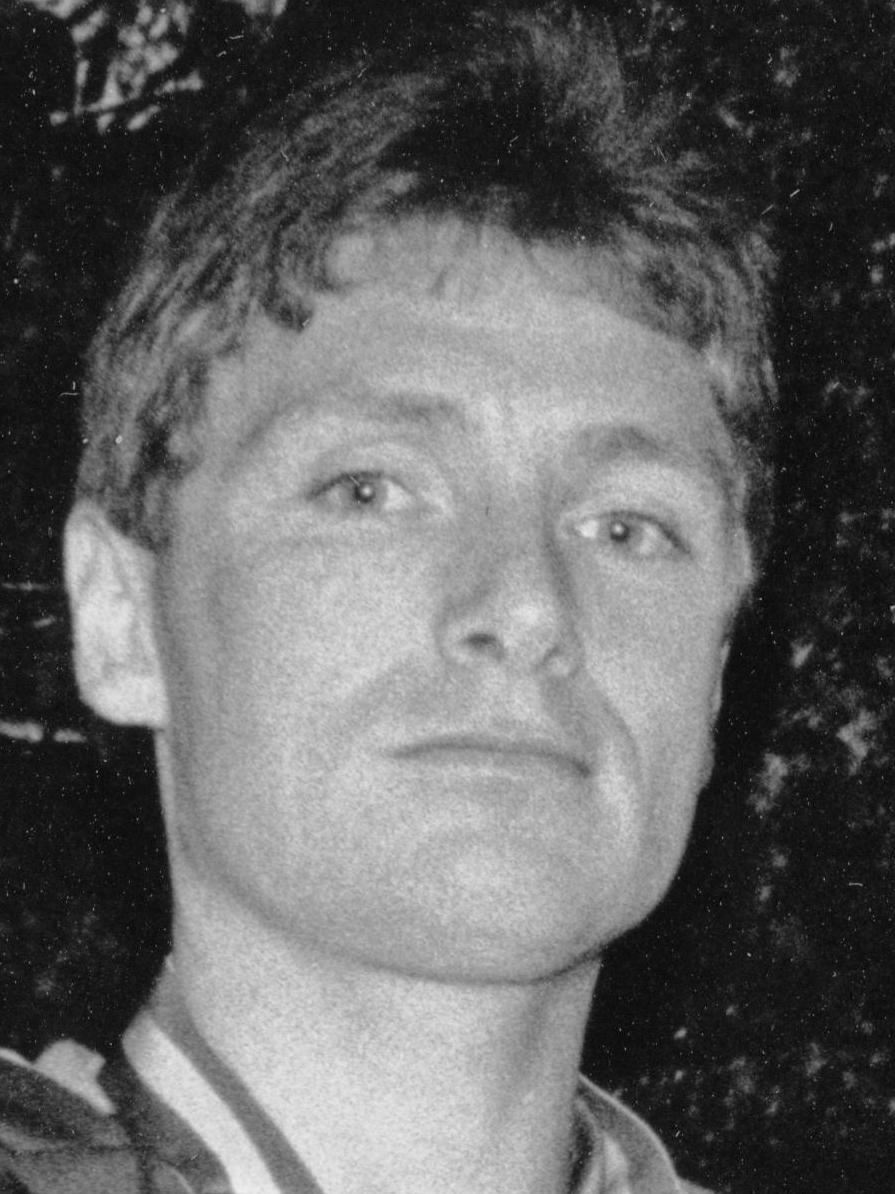
- Smith after the 1984 Boston Marathon

Personal information
- Nationality: British (English)
- Born: 24 October 1953 (age 72) Liverpool, England
- Height: 173 cm (5 ft 8 in)
- Weight: 61 kg (134 lb)

Sport
- Sport: Athletics
- Event: long-distance
- Club: Liverpool Harriers

Geoffrey Smith (born 24 October 1953) is a British former long-distance runner who won the Boston Marathon in both 1984 and 1985 and competed in the 1980 Summer Olympics and the 1984 Summer Olympics.

== Biography ==
Smith was born in Liverpool and was a member of the Liverpool Harriers.

At the 1980 Olympics Games in Moscow, he represented Great Britain in the 10,000 metres. He finished second behind Barry Smith in the 10,000 metres event at the 1981 AAA Championships.

He ran a sub-four-minute mile in 1982, recording 3:55 minutes in Wales. In 1982 he won the world class Bermuda 10K on a very hilly course in a record time of 28:14, although many world class runners have attempted this race over the years since, none have been any closer than 54 seconds behind this record. He finished second behind Charlie Spedding at the 1983 AAA Championships.

Smith's best time in the marathon was 2:09:08, when he finished second to Rod Dixon in the New York City Marathon in 1983, his first attempt at the marathon distance. Smith only lost by nine seconds. He won the 1984 Boston Marathon by over four minutes. He was the last person to win the Boston Marathon before the race organizers began giving out prize money to the winners.

Smith worked as a firefighter for ten years in the United Kingdom, joining the profession straight out of high school. He later went back to study, enrolling at Providence College and competing for the Providence Friars track and field team in Rhode Island at the age of 26 in 1980. He remained in the United States and began working as a middle school teacher and lives in Mattapoisett, Massachusetts as of 2004. He ceased running competitively in 1990 after he was injured in a fall and has had both hips replaced. He began running again, and is involved in coaching and race management in southeastern Massachusetts.

== Marathons ==
Year	Competition	Venue	Position	Notes
1983	New York City Marathon	New York, United States	2nd	2:09:08
1984	Boston Marathon	Boston, United States	1st	2:10:34
1984	Chicago Marathon	Chicago, United States	5th	2:10:08
1985	Boston Marathon	Boston, United States	1st	2:14:05
1987	Boston Marathon	Boston, United States	3rd	2:12:42
1990	Boston Marathon	Boston, United States	7th	2:13:38

== International competitions ==
Year	Competition	Venue	Position	Event	Notes
Representing Great Britain
1980	Olympic Games	Moscow, Soviet Union	26th (q)	10,000 m	30:00.01
1984	Olympic Games	Los Angeles, United States	—	Marathon	DNF
1987	World Championships	Rome, Italy	—	Marathon	DNF

== See also ==
- List of winners of the Boston Marathon
