= Eduardo Albuquerque =

Portuguese hammer thrower

Personal information
- Nationality: Portuguese
- Born: 23 July 1928 Lisbon, Portugal
- Died: 12 January 2011 (aged 82)

Sport
- Sport: Athletics
- Event: Hammer throw

Eduardo Albuquerque (23 July 1928 – 12 January 2011) was a Portuguese athlete. He competed in the men's hammer throw at the 1960 Summer Olympics.
