= Kleanthis Ierissiotis =

Greek hammer thrower (born 1953)

Personal information
- Nationality: Greek
- Born: 14 March 1953 (age 73) Thessaloniki, Greece

Sport
- Sport: Athletics
- Event: Hammer throw

Kleanthis Ierissiotis (born 14 March 1953) is a Greek athlete. He competed in the men's hammer throw at the 1976 Summer Olympics.
