= Athletics at the 1977 Summer Universiade – Men's hammer throw =

The men's hammer throw event at the 1977 Summer Universiade was held at the Vasil Levski National Stadium in Sofia on 23 August.

== Results ==
Rank	Athlete	Nationality	Result	Notes
1st place, gold medalist(s)	Emanuil Dyulgerov	Bulgaria	73.50	
2nd place, silver medalist(s)	Yuriy Sedykh	Soviet Union	72.42	
3rd place, bronze medalist(s)	Aleksandr Kozlov	Soviet Union	72.40	
4	Karl-Heinz Reißmüller	East Germany	71.56	
5	Manfred Hüning	West Germany	70.84	
6	Tamás Gábor	Hungary	69.50	
7	Scott Neilson	Canada	67.90	
8	Roland Klein	West Germany	67.20	
9	Ireneusz Golda	Poland	67.12	
10	Peter Stiefenhofer	Switzerland	65.62	
11	Tudor Stan	Romania	64.96	
12	Paul Buxton	Great Britain	64.02	
13	Rumen Kayrakov	Bulgaria	63.00	
14	Gérard Steunou	France	61.62	
