= Im Dong-sil =

South Korean hammer thrower

Personal information
- Nationality: South Korean
- Born: 15 January 1937 (age 89)

Sport
- Sport: Athletics
- Event: Hammer throw

Im Dong-sil (born 15 January 1937) is a South Korean athlete. He competed in the men's hammer throw at the 1964 Summer Olympics.

In January 1962, Im set a new South Korean record in the hammer throw at a meeting in Busan. He threw 57 m to break the old record of 55.25 m.
