= Athletics at the 1979 Summer Universiade – Men's hammer throw =

The men's hammer throw event at the 1979 Summer Universiade was held at the Estadio Olimpico Universitario in Mexico City on 12 September 1979.

== Results ==
Rank	Athlete	Nationality	Result	Notes
1st place, gold medalist(s)	Klaus Ploghaus	West Germany	75.74	UR
2nd place, silver medalist(s)	Manfred Hüning	West Germany	75.68	
3rd place, bronze medalist(s)	Yuriy Sedykh	Soviet Union	75.54	
4	Roland Steuk	East Germany	72.96	
5	Orlando Bianchini	Italy	69.34	
6	Emanuil Dyulgerov	Bulgaria	66.48	
7	Nicolae Bindar	Romania	65.96	
8	Michel Decker	France	63.78	
9	Juan Carlos Álvarez	Spain	61.50	
10	John McArdle	United States	60.36	
11	Gerardo Díaz	Mexico	49.30	
