= Claus Peter =

German hammer thrower

Personal information
- Nationality: German
- Born: 27 March 1940 (age 86) Cottbus, Germany

Sport
- Sport: Athletics
- Event: Hammer throw

Claus Peter (born 27 March 1940) is a German athlete. He competed in the men's hammer throw at the 1960 Summer Olympics.
