= Iosyp Hamskiy =

Ukrainian hammer thrower

Personal information
- Nationality: Ukrainian
- Born: 20 October 1949 (age 76) Lviv, Soviet Union

Sport
- Sport: Athletics
- Event: Hammer throw

Iosyp Hamskiy (born 20 October 1949) is a Ukrainian athlete. He competed in the men's hammer throw at the 1972 Summer Olympics, representing the Soviet Union.
