= Manfred Hüning =

West German hammer thrower

Personal information
- Born: 13 November 1953 (age 72) Rhede, West Germany

Sport
- Sport: Track and field
Medal record
Representing West Germany
Summer Universiade
Silver medal – second place	1979 Mexico City	Hammer throw

Manfred Hüning (born 13 November 1953) is a retired West German hammer thrower.

He finished sixth at the 1974 European Championships, fifth at the 1977 Summer Universiade, fifth at the 1978 European Championships, won the silver medal at the 1979 Summer Universiade, and finished fourth at the 1981 Summer Universiade.

He was set to compete at the 1980 Olympic Games, but was stopped by the West German 1980 Summer Olympics boycott. Though the hammer throw is more rarely featured in one-day track meets, Hüning competed in the Weltklasse Zürich, ISTAF Berlin and Golden Gala meets. His last year on elite level was 1983.

Domestically, he won the silver medal at the West German Championships in 1977, 1978 and 1980 as well as the bronze medals in 1974, 1976, 1979 and 1981. All these competitions except for 1974 were won by Karl-Hans Riehm. Hüning competed for the club LAZ Rhede. His personal best throw was 79.16 metres, achieved in August 1979 in Dortmund.
