= Ed Bagdonas =

American hammer thrower

Personal information
- Born: June 20, 1937 Winchendon, Massachusetts, United States
- Died: March 29, 1985 (aged 47) Bolton, Massachusetts, United States

Sport
- Sport: Athletics
- Event: Hammer throw

Ed Bagdonas (June 20, 1937 – March 29, 1985) was an American athlete. He competed in the men's hammer throw at the 1960 Summer Olympics.

Bagdonas competed for the Army Black Knights track and field team in the NCAA. He also competed on their football team.
