= Zdzisław Smoliński =

Polish hammer thrower

Personal information
- Nationality: Polish
- Born: 7 December 1942 Warsaw, Poland
- Died: 4 April 1993 (aged 50) Warsaw, Poland

Sport
- Sport: Athletics
- Event: Hammer throw

Zdzisław Smoliński (7 December 1942 – 4 April 1993) was a Polish athlete. He competed in the men's hammer throw at the 1964 Summer Olympics.

His personal best in the event was 66.99 m set in Himeji, Japan, in 1964.

== International competitions ==
Year	Competition	Venue	Position	Event	Notes
Representing Poland
1964	Olympic Games	Tokyo, Japan	14th	Hammer throw	62.90 m
1967	European Cup Final	Kiev, Soviet Union	4th	Hammer throw	64.72 m
