= William Silen =

Puerto Rican hammer thrower

Personal information
- Nationality: Puerto Rican
- Born: 29 July 1949 (age 76)

Sport
- Sport: Athletics
- Event: Hammer throw

William Silen (born 29 July 1949) is a Puerto Rican athlete. He competed in the men's hammer throw at the 1972 Summer Olympics.
