= Siegfried Lorenz (athlete) =

German hammer thrower

Personal information
- Nationality: German
- Born: 21 June 1933 (age 93) Rastenburg, Germany

Sport
- Sport: Athletics
- Event: Hammer throw

Siegfried Lorenz (born 21 June 1933) is a German athlete. He competed in the men's hammer throw at the 1960 Summer Olympics.
