= Josef Matoušek (athlete) =

Czech hammer thrower (1928–2019)

Josef Matoušek (7 September 1928 – 11 May 2019) was a Czech track and field athlete known primarily for the hammer throw.

== Life and career ==
He was born in Žampach in Czechoslovakia. He represented Czechoslovakia at the Athletics at the 1964 Summer Olympics finishing ninth. At the time he made it to the Olympics, he was 36 years old. A year before the Olympics, he threw his personal best of 68.78 m, and later that season after his 35th birthday he threw 66.82 m which became the Masters M35 world record. Had he been able to put together another 68 meter throw in the Olympics it would have made a bronze medal. He also competed at the 1962 European Athletics Championships. He died in his home in the village of Častolovice.
