= Murray Keating =

Canadian hammer thrower (born 1952)

Personal information
- Born: 28 May 1952 (age 74) Manning, Alberta, Canada

Sport
- Sport: Athletics
- Event: Hammer throw
- College team: Simon Fraser Red Leafs

Murray Keating (born 28 May 1952) is a Canadian athlete. He competed and finished in fourth place at the men's hammer throw at the 1976 Summer Olympics.
