= Manfred Seidel =

German hammer thrower

Personal information
- Nationality: German
- Born: 25 August 1949 (age 76) Bobbau, East Germany

Sport
- Sport: Athletics
- Event: Hammer throw

Manfred Seidel (born 25 August 1949) is a German athlete. He competed in the men's hammer throw at the 1976 Summer Olympics.
