= Marcin Lubiejewski =

Polish volleyball player (born 1981)

Personal information
- Full name: Marcin Lubiejewski
- Born: October 10, 1981 (age 45)
- Height: 2.05 m (6 ft 9 in)
- Spike: 350 cm (138 in)
- Block: 339 cm (133 in)

Marcin Lubiejewski (born October 10, 1981) is a Polish volleyball player playing in an attacking position.

He started his career at MKS MDK Warsaw and in the 2000/2001 season he joined Stilon Gorzów Wielkopolski. Since 2002, he has played for Joker Piła from where, in 2004, he returned to Gorzów, where coach Waldemar Wspaniały switched him to the attacking position. In 2005, he left GTPS and joined Chemik Bydgoszcz. From the 2006/2007 season he was a player of AZS Olsztyn. In 2008, he left Olsztyn and moved to Siatkarz Wieluń.
