= Lutz Caspers =

German hammer thrower

Personal information
- Nationality: German
- Born: 10 July 1943 (age 83) Winterberg, West Germany

Sport
- Sport: Athletics
- Event: Hammer throw

Lutz Caspers (born 10 July 1943) is a German athlete. He competed in the men's hammer throw at the 1968 Summer Olympics.
