= Boris Zaitchouk =

Soviet hammer thrower

Boris Pavlovich Zaitchouk (Russian: Борис Павлович Зайчук; born August 28, 1947, in Kazakhstan) (Used earlier alternative English spelling is Boris Zaichuk) is a male hammer thrower from the Soviet Union. He was the world record holder for nearly one month in 1978, when he became the first man ever to throw 80 meters. During the 2007 World Masters Athletics Championships in Riccione, Italy, Zaitchouk (throwing for Canada) threw 61.96 meters, a new world record in the M60 class. Zaitchouk lives in Ottawa, Ontario, Canada and as of 2021 is still active in throwing (at the Master level) and coaching.

Records
Preceded by (West Germany) Walter Schmidt	Men's Hammer World Record Holder; July 9, 1978 – August 6, 1978	Succeeded by (West Germany) Karl-Hans Riehm
