= Tom Gage (athlete) =

American hammer thrower (1943–2010)

Medal record

Men's Athletics

Representing the United States

Pan American Games
Gold medal – first place	1967 Winnipeg	Hammer Throw

Thomas Lewis Gage (May 16, 1943 – July 15, 2010) was an American Hammer Thrower from Billings, Montana. Gage graduated from Cornell University in 1965. During the late 1960s to the early 1970s he was in the top 10 among American hammer throwers for 10 years including achieving number 1 in 1972. He won the gold medal at the 1967 Pan American Games in Winnipeg, Manitoba, Canada and was a finalist in the 1972 Olympics in Munich, Germany, ultimately finishing 12th. His personal best was 71.17, set in 1971.

== Masters ==
He continued to throw the hammer and weight implements through the various Masters age groups, setting the M60 World Record in 2004. He also held the M50 age group world record for 9 years before it was surpassed by another former Olympian Jud Logan. He was a 2001 inductee into the Masters division of the USATF National Track and Field Hall of Fame.

The University of Montana hosts the Tom Gage Classic named in his honor.
