= Liverpool Harriers and Athletic Club =

British athletics club

- Founded: 1882
- Ground: Wavertree Athletics Centre
- Location: Wavertree Sports Park, Wellington Road, Liverpool L15 4LE, England
- Coordinates: 53°23′45″N 2°55′26″W
- Website: official website

Liverpool Harriers and Athletic Club is a British athletics club based in Liverpool, England. The club is based primarily at the Wavertree Athletics Centre on Wellington Road and train on Tuesday and Thursday evenings.

== History ==
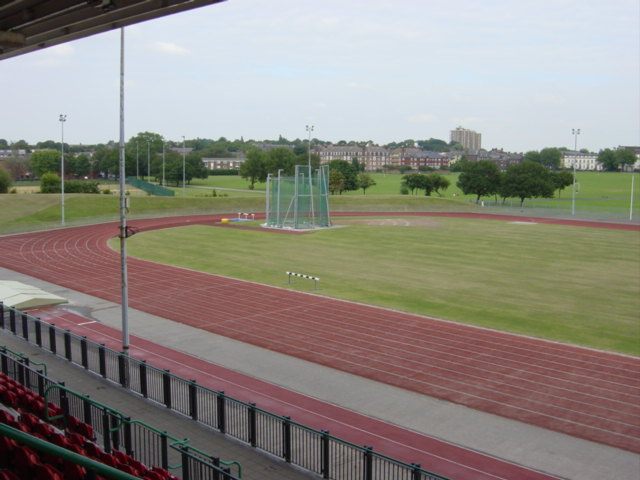
The track in 2005

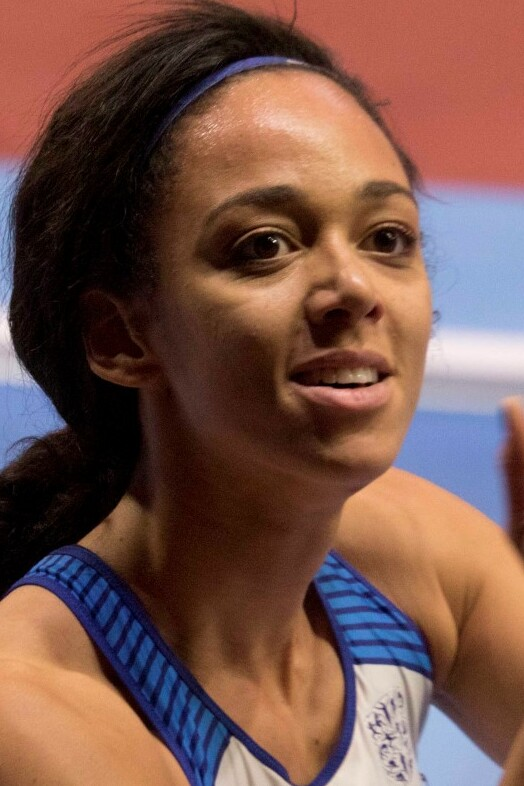
Double world champion Katarina Johnson-Thompson

The club was founded as a cross-country club on 27 September 1882, following a meeting at the Farnworth Hotel on Prescot Road. In 1885, the club won the English National Cross Country Championships, with the runners consisting of Paddy Shay, Edward McCabe, Tommy Duckett, George Henry Bannister, P. Giblin and McAffee.

It is believed that towards the end of the century that the club were also referred to as Liverpool Sefton Park and All Saints but on Monday 19 November 1894, the club was renamed the Liverpool Harriers & Athletic Club.

The club's first Olympian was Benjamin Howard Baker who competed in the high jump event at the 1912 Summer Olympics in Stockholm, Sweden.

From 1943 to 1970 the club were based at Woolton Woods, followed by Woolton Boys Club from 1970 to 1980 and Woolton Priory from 1980 until 1990. The club moved to its present site at the Wavertree Athletics Centre in 1990.

The club continue to produce international class athletes, with the latest star being double world heptathlon champion Katarina Johnson-Thompson.

== Honours ==
- English National Cross Country Championships winners: 1885

== Notable athletes ==
=== Olympians ===
Athlete	Events	Games	Medals/Ref
Benjamin Howard Baker	high jump, triple jump	1912, 1920	
Ken Box	100m, 4x100m	1956	
Tom Farrell	400m hurdles, 800m	1956, 1960	
Joe Speake	4x100m	1968	
Keith Oliver	XC Sking, biathlon	1972, 1976, 1980	
Barry Williams	hammer throw	1972	
(Republic of Ireland) John Woods	marathon	1988	
Geoff Smith	10,000m	1980	
Curtis Robb	800m	1992, 1996	
Steve Smith	high jump	1992, 1996	Bronze medal
(Northern Ireland) Paul Brizzel	100m, 200m, 4x100m	2000	
(Northern Ireland) Paul McKee	4 x 400m	2000	
(Northern Ireland) John McAdorey	4 x 100m	2000	
Allyn Condon	bobsleigh	2010	+
Anyika Onuora	100m, 200m 4x400m	2012, 2016	Bronze medal
Katarina Johnson-Thompson	heptathlon	2012, 2016, 2020	

- English unless stated

+Trained with the club during bobsleigh career
