= Reinhard Theimer =

East German hammer thrower (1948–2020)

Personal information
- Nationality: East Germany
- Born: 28 February 1948 Berlin, Allied-occupied Germany
- Died: 3 September 2020 (aged 72) Hohen Neuendorf, Germany
- Height: 1.84 m (6 ft 0 in)
- Weight: 105 kg (231 lb)

Sport
- Country: East Germany
- Sport: Men's athletics
- Event: Men's Hammer throw
- Club: Berliner TSC

Achievements and titles
- Personal best: 76.60 (1974)
Medal record
Men's athletics
Representing East Germany
European Championships
Silver medal – second place	1971 Helsinki	Hammer throw
Bronze medal – third place	1969 Athens	Hammer throw
Bronze medal – third place	1974 Rome	Hammer throw

Reinhard Theimer (28 February 1948 – 3 September 2020) was an East German hammer thrower. He competed for the sports club TSC Berlin during his active career.

== International competitions ==
Year	Competition	Venue	Position	Notes
Representing East Germany
1966	European Junior Championships	Odessa, Soviet Union	2nd	
1968	Olympic Games	Mexico City, Mexico	7th	
1969	European Championships	Athens, Greece	3rd	
1971	European Championships	Helsinki, Finland	2nd	
1972	Olympic Games	Munich, West Germany	13th	
1974	European Championships	Rome, Italy	7th	

Records
Preceded by Walter Schmidt	Men's Hammer World Record Holder; 4 July 1974 – 11 September 1974	Succeeded by Aleksei Spiridonov
