= Noboru Okamoto =

Japanese hammer thrower

Personal information
- Nationality: Japanese
- Born: 19 February 1937 (age 89) Korea
- Height: 178 cm (5 ft 10 in)
- Weight: 90 kg (198 lb)

Sport
- Sport: Athletics
- Event: hammer throw

Noboru Okamoto (岡本 登, Okamoto Noboru; born 19 February 1937) is a Japanese former hammer thrower who competed in the 1960 Summer Olympics and in the 1964 Summer Olympics.

Okamoto won the British AAA Championships title in the hammer throw event at the 1962 AAA Championships.
