= Aleksey Spiridonov (athlete) =

Soviet hammer thrower

Personal information
- Native name: Алексей Сергеевич Слирдонов
- Nationality: Russian
- Born: 20 November 1951 Leningrad, Russian SFSR, Soviet Union
- Died: 9 April 1998 (aged 46)
- Height: 1.92 m (6 ft 4 in)
- Weight: 117 kg (258 lb)

Sport
- Country: Soviet Union
- Sport: Athletics
- Event: Hammer throw
- Club: Trud Leningrad

Achievements and titles
- Personal best: 78.62 m (1976)
Medal record
Men's Athletics
Representing the Soviet Union
Olympic Games
Silver medal – second place	1976 Montreal	Hammer throw
European Championships
Gold medal – first place	1974 Rome	Hammer throw
Universiade
Gold medal – first place	1975 Rome	Hammer throw
Silver medal – second place	1973 Moscow	Hammer throw

Aleksey Sergeyevich Spiridonov (Russian: Алексей Серге́евич Спиридонов) (20 November 1951 – 9 April 1998) was a Soviet athlete who mainly competed in the men's hammer throw event. Born in Leningrad he trained at VSS Trud in Leningrad.

He competed for the Soviet Union in the 1976 Summer Olympics held in Montreal, Quebec, Canada in the hammer throw where he won the silver medal. His trainer was Oleg Kolodiy.

Records
Preceded by Reinhard Theimer	Men's Hammer World Record Holder; 11 September 1974 – 19 May 1975	Succeeded by Karl-Hans Riehm
