= Gennadiy Kondrashov =

Personal information
- Born: 8 December 1938 (age 87) Zugres, Sverdlovsk Oblast

Sport
- Sport: Track and field
Medal record
Representing Soviet Union
Summer Universiade
Gold medal – first place	1961 Sofia	Hammer throw
Silver medal – second place	1963 Porto Alegre	Hammer throw
Silver medal – second place	1965 Budapest	Hammer throw

Gennadiy Dmitriyevich Kondrashov (Russian: Геннадий Дмитриевич Кондрашов; born 8 December 1938) is a retired male hammer thrower, who competed for the Soviet Union at the 1968 Summer Olympics. He set his personal best (70.52 metres) on 21 July 1968 in Leningrad.

== International competitions ==
Representing the Soviet Union
Year	Competition	Venue	Position	Notes
1963	World Student Games	Porto Alegre, Brazil	1st	
1968	Olympic Games	Mexico City, Mexico	6th	69.08 m
