= José Luis Martínez (hammer thrower) =

Spanish hammer thrower

Personal information
- Nationality: Spanish
- Born: 2 July 1943 León, Spain
- Died: 19 April 2004 (aged 60) Madrid, Spain

Sport
- Sport: Athletics
- Event: Hammer throw

José Luis Martínez Vázquez (2 July 1943 – 19 April 2004) was a Spanish athlete. He competed in the men's hammer throw at the 1968 Summer Olympics.
