= Birger Asplund =

Swedish hammer thrower (1929–2023)

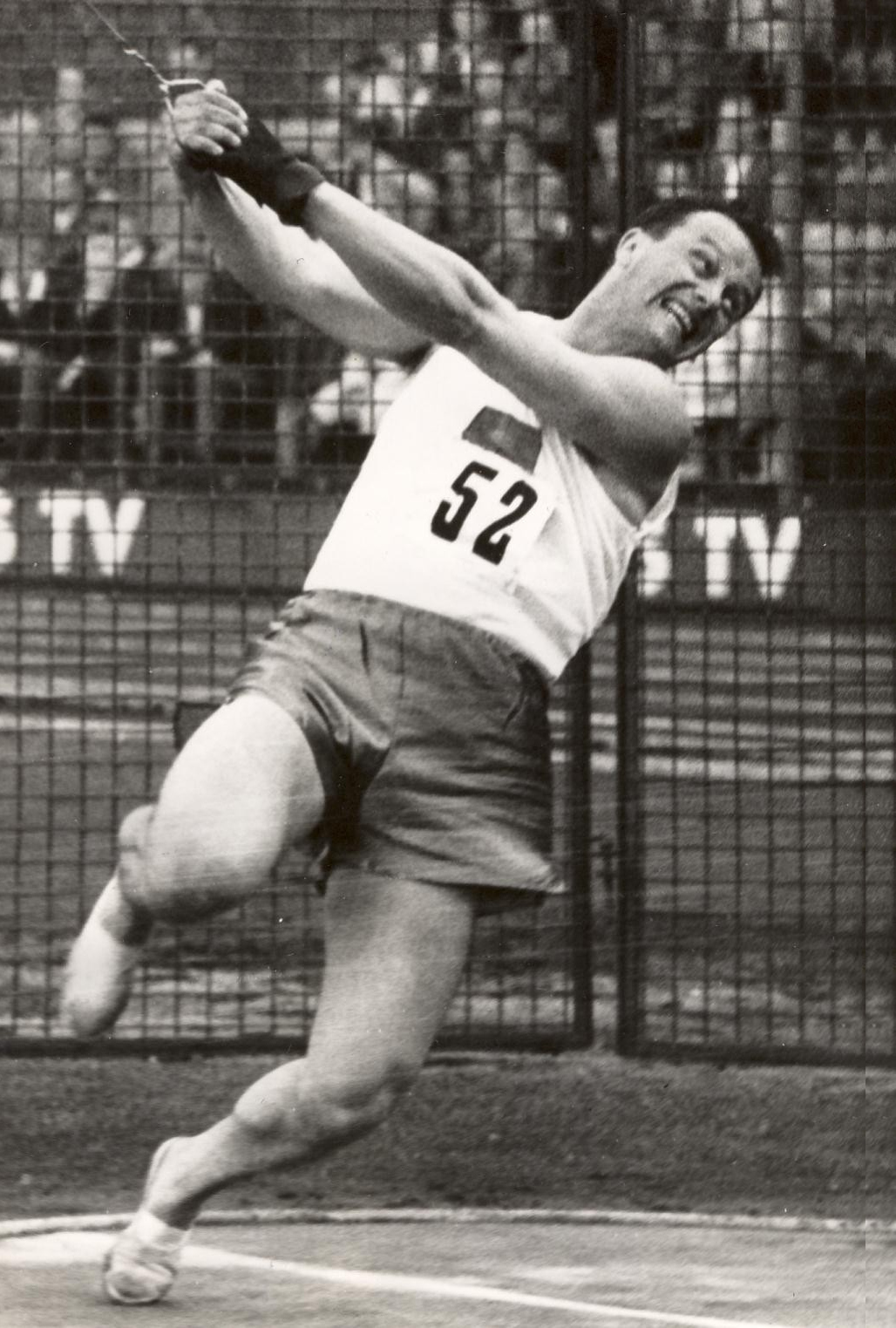
- Asplund in the 1950s

Personal information
- Born: 21 July 1929 Anjan, Åre, Sweden
- Died: 1 July 2023 (aged 93) Ås, Sweden
- Height: 1.78 m (5 ft 10 in)
- Weight: 86 kg (190 lb)

Sport
- Sport: Athletics
- Event: Hammer throw
- Club: IF Castor; IFK Västerås; Hofors AIF

Achievements and titles
- Personal best: 66.37 m (1964)

Karl Birger Asplund (21 July 1929 – 1 July 2023) was a Swedish hammer thrower. He represented his native country at the 1956, 1960, and 1964 Olympics with the best result of 21st place in 1964. At the 1958 European Athletics Championships he placed sixth, setting a national record.

Asplund won 15 consecutive national titles in 1954–68 and became the Nordic champion in 1961 and 1963. Before 1964 he improved the national record 17 times. In 1970 Asplund set the Masters M40 World Record at 64.70 m. It was broken almost two years later by Hal Connolly, the 1956 Olympic champion. Asplund's record was more than a metre and a half further than Connolly threw in the Olympics.

Asplund died in Ås on 1 July 2023, at the age of 93.
