= Lázár Lovász =

Hungarian hammer thrower (1942–2023)

Personal information
- Nationality: Hungarian
- Born: 24 May 1942 Lipar, Serbia
- Died: 17 April 2023 (aged 80) Pécs, Hungary
- Height: 189 cm (6 ft 2 in)
- Weight: 99 kg (218 lb)

Sport
- Sport: Athletics
- Event: Hammer throw
- Club: Pécsi Mecsek
Medal record
Men's athletics
Bronze medal – third place	1968 Mexico City	Hammer throw

Lázár Lovász (24 May 1942 – 17 April 2023) was a Hungarian athlete who competed in hammer throw, who competed at the 1968 Summer Olympics.

== Biography ==
Lovász won the British AAA Championships title in the hammer throw event at the 1968 AAA Championships. Later thay year at the 1968 Olympic Games in Mexico City, he represented Hungary and won a bronze medal, throwing 69.78 metres.

Lovász died on 17 April 2023, at the age of 80.
