= Takeo Sugawara =

Japanese hammer thrower (born 1938)

Personal information
- Nationality: Japanese
- Born: 23 May 1938 (age 88) Akita Prefecture, Japan
- Height: 174 cm (5 ft 9 in)
- Weight: 83 kg (183 lb)

Sport
- Sport: Athletics
- Event: hammer throw
Medal record
Representing Japan
Asian Games
Gold medal – first place	1966 Bangkok	Hammer throw
Silver medal – second place	1962 Jakarta	Hammer throw

Takeo Sugawara (菅原 武男, Sugawara Takeo; born 23 May 1938) is a Japanese former hammer thrower who competed in the 1960 Summer Olympics, in the 1964 Summer Olympics, in the 1968 Summer Olympics, and in the 1972 Summer Olympics.

Sugawara won the British AAA Championships title at the 1963 AAA Championships and returned in 1968 to finish second behind Lázár Lovász at the 1968 AAA Championships.
