= Vasily Rudenkov =

Soviet athlete

Personal information
- Native name: Василиӣ Васильевич Руденков
- Full name: Vasily Vasilyevich Rudenkov
- Nationality: Belarusian
- Born: 3 May 1931 Zhlobin, Zhlobin District, Byelorussian SSR, Soviet Union
- Died: 2 November 1982 (aged 51) Zhlobin, Byelorussian SSR, Soviet Union
- Height: 1.87 m (6 ft 2 in)
- Weight: 96 kg (212 lb)

Sport
- Country: Soviet Union
- Sport: Athletics
- Event: Hammer throw
- Club: Dynamo Moscow

Achievements and titles
- Personal best: 68.91 m (1961)
Medal record
Men's Athletics
Representing the Soviet Union
Olympic Games
Gold medal – first place	1960 Rome	Hammer throw

Vasily Vasilyevich Rudenkov (Belarusian: Васіль Васілевіч Рудзянкоў; Russian: Василий Васильевич Руденков; 3 May 1931 – 2 November 1982) was a Soviet athlete who competed mainly in the hammer throw. He was born in Zhlobin.

Rudenkov competed for the USSR in the 1960 Summer Olympics held in Rome, Italy in the hammer throw where he won the gold medal. It was his only Olympics appearance.

He trained at Dynamo in Moscow and became an Honoured Master of Sport of the USSR in 1960, along with being awarded the Order of the Red Banner of Labour the same year.
