= Romuald Klim =

Soviet and Belarusian hammer thrower (1933–2011)

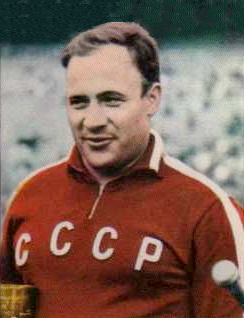
- Klim in 1968

Personal information
- Native name: Рамуальд Язэпавіч Клім
- Nationality: Belarusian
- Born: Romuald Iosifovich Klim; 25 May 1933 Khvoevo, Nieśwież county, Nowogródek Voivodeship (1919–1939), Second Polish Republic
- Died: 28 May 2011 (aged 78) Minsk, Belarus
- Height: 1.85 m (6 ft 1 in)
- Weight: 103 kg (227 lb)

Sport
- Country: Soviet Union
- Sport: Athletics
- Event: Hammer throw
- Club: Krasnoye Zhnamya Vitebsk; SKA Minsk

Achievements and titles
- Personal best: 74.52 m (1969)
Medal record
Men's athletics
Representing the Soviet Union
Olympic Games
Gold medal – first place	1964 Tokyo	Hammer throw
Silver medal – second place	1968 Mexico City	Hammer throw
European Championships
Gold medal – first place	1966 Budapest	Hammer throw
Silver medal – second place	1969 Athens	Hammer throw

Romuald Iosifovich Klim (Belarusian: Рамуальд Язэпавіч Клім, Russian: Ромуальд Иосифович Клим, 25 May 1933 – 28 May 2011) was a Soviet hammer thrower. He competed at the 1964 and 1968 Olympics and won a gold and a silver medal, respectively. Klim was awarded the Order of the Badge of Honor in 1965.

Klim was born in a farmer's family. He started training in hammer throw around 1955, but became noticed only in 1963, after winning the Riga Cup and finishing second at the 1963 Soviet Championships. In those years Klim was lighter (ca. 90 kg) and physically weaker than elite Soviet throwers, but he had a strong mental balance and a superior throwing technique; he added weight only after joining the national team. The 1964 Olympics were his first international competitions. After three attempts he was third behind Gyula Zsivótzky and world record holder Hal Connolly, but then threw 69.74 m (228.8 ft) and won a surprising gold medal. After that Klim won the 1966 European Championships, the European Cup in 1965 and 1967, and three Soviet Championships (1966–1968). He finished second at the 1968 Games behind Zsivótzky, who had been his main rival all those years. In 1969 Klim finished second at the 1969 European Championships and set his only world record (74.52 m). He retired in 1973 to become an athletics coach and referee. From 1989 until his death he was professor at the Belorussian Academy of Physical Culture and Sports. Since 1976 a hammer throwing competition has been held in his honor in Minsk.

Klim was married and had a daughter born in 1957 and two twin sons born in 1960.

Romuald Klim died in Minsk on 28 May 2011. He was buried at the Eastern Cemetery.

Records
Preceded by (Hungary) Gyula Zsivótzky	Men's Hammer World Record Holder; 15 June 1969 – 12 October 1969	Succeeded by (Soviet Union) Anatoliy Bondarchuk
