= Barry Williams (athlete) =

British athlete

Personal information
- Nationality: British (English)
- Born: 5 March 1947 (age 79) Liverpool, Great Britain
- Height: 188 cm (6 ft 2 in)
- Weight: 105 kg (231 lb)

Sport
- Sport: Athletics
- Event: Hammer throw
- Club: Liverpool Harriers
Medal record
Athletics
Representing England
Commonwealth Games
Bronze medal – third place	1970 Edinburgh	hammer

Barry Williams (born 5 March 1947) is a British retired international athlete who competed at the 1972 Summer Olympics.

== Biography ==
Williams, a member of the Liverpool Harriers, represented England and won a bronze medal in the hammer throw, at the 1970 British Commonwealth Games in Edinburgh, Scotland.

Williams finished second behind Howard Payne in the hammer throw event at the 1971 AAA Championships but the following year became the British hammer throw champion after winning the British AAA Championships title at the 1972 AAA Championships. Shortly afterwards Williams represented Great Britain at the 1972 Olympics Games in Munich, where he participated in the men's hammer throw.

Williams was on the podium twice more at the AAAs in 1973 and 1974 and sandwiched in between he competed in the hammer throw again at the 1974 British Commonwealth Games in Christchurch, New Zealand.
