= Stanisław Lubiejewski =

Polish hammer thrower

Personal information
- Nationality: Polish
- Born: 27 May 1947 (age 79) Kleczków, Dolnośląskie, Poland

Sport
- Sport: Athletics
- Event: Hammer throw

Stanisław Lubiejewski (born 27 May 1947) is a Polish athlete. He competed in the men's hammer throw at the 1972 Summer Olympics.
