= Yuriy Nikulin =

Soviet hammer thrower (1931–1988)

Yuriy Nikulin (Russian: Юрий Никулин; January 8, 1931 – 1988) was a Soviet hammer thrower. He was born in Moscow. He competed for the USSR in the 1960 Summer Olympics and 1964 Summer Olympics. His son Igor would also take up the hammer, taking an Olympic bronze medal for the United Team in 1992.
