= Edwin Klein =

German hammer thrower

Personal information
- Nationality: German
- Born: 19 June 1948 (age 77) Konz, West Germany

Sport
- Sport: Athletics
- Event: Hammer throw

Edwin Klein (born 19 June 1948) is a German former athlete. He competed in the men's hammer throw at the 1972 Summer Olympics and the 1976 Summer Olympics.
