= Ernst Ammann =

Swiss hammer thrower

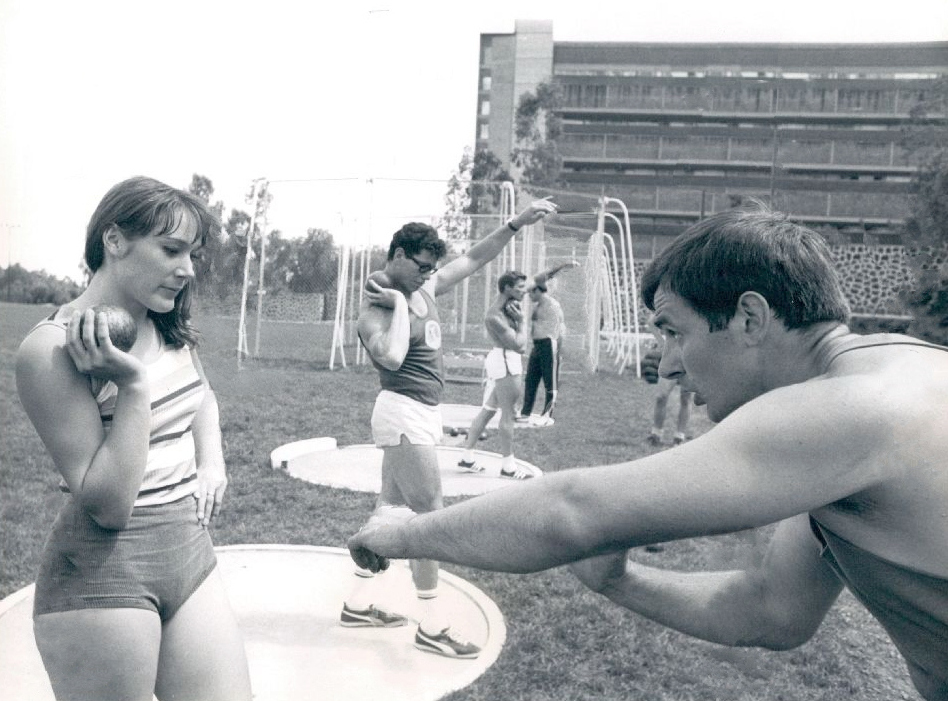
- Sieglinde and Ernst Ammann at the 1968 Olympics

Personal information
- Born: 24 January 1941 (age 85) Tägerwilen, Switzerland
- Height: 188 cm (6 ft 2 in)
- Weight: 113 kg (249 lb)

Sport
- Sport: Athletics
- Event: Hammer throw
- Club: SC Liestal

Achievements and titles
- Personal best: 68.74 m (1971)

Ernst Ammann (born 24 January 1941) is a retired Swiss hammer thrower. He competed at the 1968 Summer Olympics and placed 19th; his wife Sieglinde competed alongside in the pentathlon and long jump.
