= Uwe Beyer =

German hammer thrower (1945–1993)

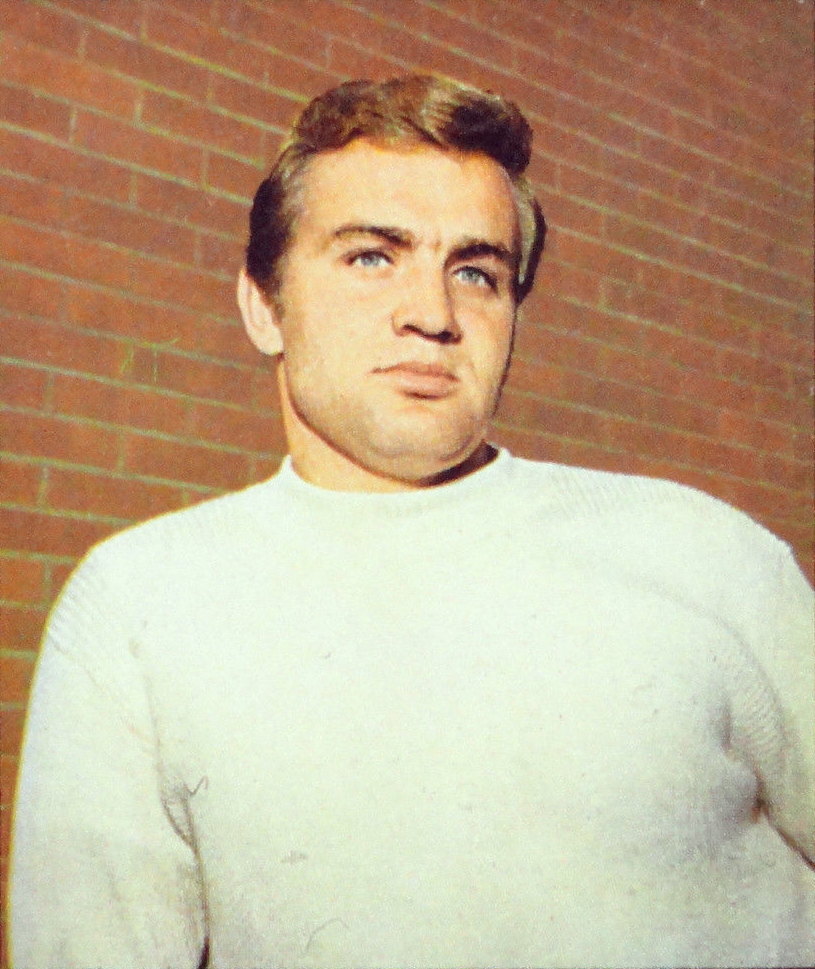
- Uwe Beyer in 1972

Personal information
- Born: 14 April 1945 Timmendorf, Schleswig-Holstein, Germany
- Died: 15 April 1993 (aged 48) Belek, Turkey
- Height: 1.91 m (6 ft 3 in)
- Weight: 108 kg (238 lb)

Sport
- Sport: Athletics
- Event: Hammer throw
- Club: Holstein Kiel; Bayer Leverkusen; Universitätssportclub Mainz

Achievements and titles
- Personal best: 74.90 m (1971)
Medal record
Men's athletics
Representing Germany
Olympic Games
Bronze medal – third place	1964 Tokyo	Hammer throw
Representing West Germany
European Championships
Gold medal – first place	1971 Helsinki	Hammer throw
Bronze medal – third place	1966 Budapest	Hammer throw
Summer Universiade
Bronze medal – third place	1973 Moscow	Hammer throw

Uwe Beyer (14 April 1945 – 15 April 1993) was a West German hammer thrower. He competed at the 1964, 1968 and 1972 Olympics and won the bronze medal in 1964, representing the United Team of Germany, and later finished fourth in 1972 representing West Germany. He won the European title in 1971 and finished third in 1966 and fifth in 1974. Domestically Beyer won eight consecutive German titles in 1964–71, and received the Silbernes Lorbeerblatt in 1964. He also starred as Siegfried in Die Nibelungen. Beyer had a degree in physical education and in retirement ran a sports store in Mainz. His father Erich competed nationally in the shot put.

Beyer suffered a fatal heart attack while playing tennis in the Turkish beach resort of Belek, possibly as a delayed result of the use of anabolic steroids throughout his career, to which he freely admitted in a 1977 interview in the "Aktuelles Sportstudio" on ZDF.
