= Walter Schmidt (hammer thrower) =

Personal information
- Born: August 7, 1948 (age 77) Lahr, Baden-Württemberg

Sport
- Sport: Track and field
Medal record
Representing West Germany
Summer Universiade
Silver medal – second place	1975 Rome	Hammer throw

Walter Schmidt (born August 7, 1948) is a male retired hammer thrower from West Germany. He was one of the leading athletes in his discipline in the 1970s, setting two world records. He ended up in fifth place at the 1976 Summer Olympics in Montreal, Quebec, Canada.

Records
Preceded by (Soviet Union) Anatoliy Bondarchuk	Men's Hammer World Record Holder; September 4, 1971 – July 4, 1974	Succeeded by (East Germany) Reinhard Theimer
Preceded by (West Germany) Karl-Hans Riehm	Men's Hammer World Record Holder; August 14, 1975 – July 9, 1978	Succeeded by (Soviet Union) Boris Zaychuk
