= Anatoliy Bondarchuk =

Ukrainian hammer thrower (1940–2025)

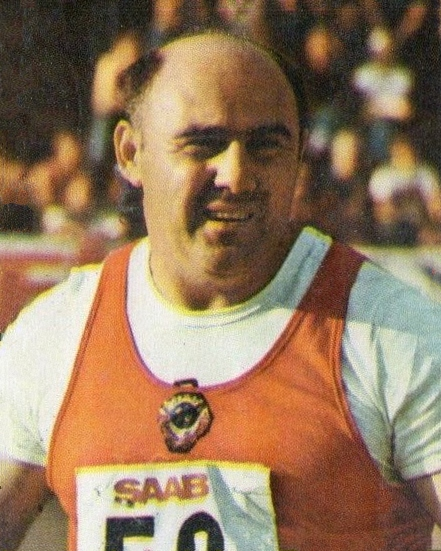

Personal information
- Nationality: Ukrainian
- Born: 31 May 1940 Starokostiantyniv, Kamianets-Podilskyi Oblast, Ukrainian SSR, Soviet Union
- Died: 23 December 2025 (aged 85) Kamloops, Canada
- Height: 1.83 m (6 ft 0 in)
- Weight: 113 kg (249 lb)

Sport
- Country: Soviet Union
- Sport: Athletics
- Event: Hammer throw
- Club: Kolos Kiev

Achievements and titles
- Personal best: 77.42 m (1976)
Medal record
Men's athletics
Representing the Soviet Union
Olympic Games
Gold medal – first place	1972 Munich	Hammer throw
Bronze medal – third place	1976 Montreal	Hammer throw
European Championships
Gold medal – first place	1969 Athens	Hammer throw
Bronze medal – third place	1971 Helsinki	Hammer throw

Anatoliy Pavlovych Bondarchuk (Ukrainian: Анатолій Павлович Бондарчук, 31 May 1940 – 23 December 2025) was a Ukrainian hammer thrower who competed for the Soviet Union. An Olympic gold medallist, he is regarded as one of the most accomplished hammer throw coaches of all time. He was the author of a two-volume book, Transfer of Training, which was translated from Russian to English by Michael Yessis.

== Career ==
As an athlete, Bondarchuk accumulated numerous international awards and honors throughout a long career. Beginning the hammer throw at a late age of 24, he won his first international title at the 1969 European championships. Near the end of the season, Bondarchuk set two world records in the event. Bondarchuk remained among the world's elite for several years and won the gold medal at the 1972 Summer Olympics while setting an Olympic record of 75.50 meters. Four years later, he earned the bronze medal at the 1976 Summer Olympics. For his Olympic achievements Bondarchuk was awarded the Order of the Badge of Honour in 1972 and the Order of the Red Banner of Labour in 1976.

Besides his athletic achievements, Bondarchuk is equally well known as a coach. He began coaching while competing himself and thereafter worked with medal-winning athletes at five Olympic Games. More than 31 high athletes have achieved podium performances in World Championships and Olympic Games under his tutelage. His most famous trainee is two-time Olympic champion and current hammer world record holder Yuri Sedykh. Bondarchuk lived and coached in Kamloops, British Columbia, Canada, where he guided Canadian shot put record holder Dylan Armstrong to a bronze medal at the 2008 Summer Olympics. His trainees in hammer throw include Canadian record holder Sultana Frizell, former Canadian record holders Jennifer Joyce and Crystal Smith, Megann Rodhe, U.S. champion Kibwe Johnson, Caymanian record holder Michael Letterlough, Swiss champion Martin Bingisser, and 2012 Canadian Olympian Justin Rodhe.

== Death ==
On 23 December 2025, it was announced that Bondarchuk had died at the age of 85.

Records
Preceded by (Soviet Union) Romuald Klim	Men's Hammer World Record Holder; 12 October 1969 – 4 September 1971	Succeeded by (West Germany) Walter Schmidt
