= Jochen Sachse =

East German hammer thrower

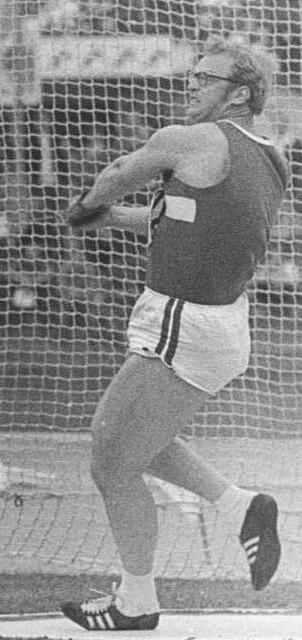
- Sachse competing in the hammer at the 1972 Summer Olympics

Personal information
- Nationality: East Germany
- Born: 2 October 1948 (age 78) Frankenberg, Saxony, Soviet occupation zone of Germany
- Height: 1.93 m (6 ft 4 in)
- Weight: 112 kg (247 lb)

Sport
- Country: East Germany
- Sport: Men's athletics
- Event: Men's Hammer throw
- Club: SC Karl-Marx-Stadt

Achievements and titles
- Personal best: 76.44 m (1977)
Medal record
Men's athletics
Representing East Germany
Olympic Games
Silver medal – second place	1972 Munich	Hammer throw
European Championships
Silver medal – second place	1974 Rome	Hammer throw
Universiade
Gold medal – first place	1970 Turin	Hammer throw

Jochen Sachse (born 2 October 1948 in Frankenberg, Saxony) is an East German former track and field athlete who competed mainly in the hammer throw.

He competed for East Germany in the 1972 Summer Olympics held in Munich, Germany in the hammer throw where he won the silver medal.
