= Sándor Eckschmiedt =

Hungarian hammer thrower (1938–2023)

Personal information
- Nationality: Hungarian
- Born: 25 October 1938 Budapest, Hungary
- Died: 12 August 2023 (aged 84)

Sport
- Sport: Athletics
- Event: Hammer throw

Sándor Eckschmiedt (25 October 1938 – 12 August 2023) was a Hungarian athlete. He competed in the men's hammer throw at the 1964, 1968 and the 1972 Summer Olympics.

Eckschmiedt died on 12 August 2023, at the age of 84.
