= Howard Payne (athlete) =

English hammer thrower (1931–1992)

Personal information
- Nationality: British (English)
- Born: 17 April 1931 Benoni, Gauteng, South Africa
- Died: 1 March 1992 (aged 60) Birmingham, England

Sport
- Sport: Athletics
- Event: hammer throw
- Club: Birchfield Harriers
Medal record
Men's Athletics
Representing England
British Empire and Commonwealth Games
Gold medal – first place	1962 Perth	Hammer throw
Gold medal – first place	1966 Kingston	Hammer throw
Gold medal – first place	1970 Edinburgh	Hammer throw
Silver medal – second place	1974 Christchurch	Hammer throw

Andrew 'Howard' Payne (17 April 1931 – 1 March 1992) was an English Olympic track and field athlete. He specialised in the hammer throw event during his career and competed at three Olympic Games.

== Biography ==
He was born in Benoni, Gauteng (South Africa) and studied physics at the University of Birmingham. In 1971 he was a lecturer at the university.

Payne represented Great Britain in three consecutive Olympic Games, starting in 1964. He previously competed for Southern Rhodesia at the 1958 British Empire and Commonwealth Games.

Payne claimed the gold medal for England in the men's hammer throw event at three consecutive Commonwealth Games in 1962, 1966 and the 1970 British Commonwealth Games in Edinburgh, Scotland. He also represented England and won a silver medal, at the 1974 British Commonwealth Games in Christchurch, New Zealand.

Payne was 13 times British hammer throw champion from 1961 to 1974 after winning the British AAA Championships title. He won the title outright in 1964, 1969, 1970, 1971 and 1973 and was the best placed British athlete in 1961, 1962, 1963, 1965, 1966, 1967, 1968 and 1974.

He died in Birmingham aged 60. Payne was at one time married to discus thrower Rosemary Payne.

== Archives ==
Archives of Howard Payne are held at the Cadbury Research Library, University of Birmingham.
