= Athletics at the 1979 Summer Universiade – Men's 400 metres =

The men's 400 metres event at the 1979 Summer Universiade was held at the Estadio Olimpico Universitario in Mexico City on 8, 9 and 11 September 1979.

== Medalists ==
Gold	Silver	Bronze
Harald Schmid; West Germany	Franz-Peter Hofmeister; West Germany	Walter McCoy; United States

== Results ==
=== Heats ===
Rank	Heat	Athlete	Nationality	Time	Notes
1	4	Nikolay Chernetsky	Soviet Union	45.45	Q
2	2	Walter McCoy	United States	46.00	Q
3	1	Harald Schmid	West Germany	46.12	Q
4	6	Horia Toboc	Romania	46.15	Q
5	7	Koen Gijsbers	Netherlands	46.19	Q
6	6	Isidoro Hornillos	Spain	46.24	Q, NR
7	2	Jens Smedegaard	Denmark	46.32	Q
7	7	Remigijus Valiulis	Soviet Union	46.32	Q
9	6	Roberto Tozzi	Italy	46.34	Q, PB
10	4	Lew Davis	Jamaica	46.39	Q
11	1	Geraldo José Pegado	Brazil	46.49	Q
12	6	Rolf Gisler	Switzerland	46.69	q
13	5	Leslie Kerr	United States	46.79	Q
14	3	Franz-Peter Hofmeister	West Germany	46.93	Q
15	3	Robert Froissart	France	47.06	Q
16	7	Eiji Natori	Japan	47.15	Q
17	2	Alan Bell	Great Britain	47.22	Q
18	3	Avognan Nogboum	Ivory Coast	47.23	Q
19	4	Jenaro Iritia	Spain	47.45	Q
20	4	Marcel Klarenbeek	Netherlands	47.54	q
21	5	Alexander Fortelny	Austria	47.66	Q
22	5	Chum Darvall	Australia	47.96	Q
23	7	Jean-Prosper Rajaonarison	Madagascar	48.13	q
24	1	Takashi Nagao	Japan	48.45	Q
25	4	Gabriel Leseku	Tanzania	48.46	
26	2	Antonis Georgallidis	Cyprus	48.61	
27	7	Alfonso Pérez	Mexico	49.17	
28	3	António Mota Gomes	Angola	49.23	
29	4	Adodo Djobokou	Togo	49.68	
30	1	Patrick Kagwisagne	Uganda	49.75	
31	5	David Martínez	Mexico	49.86	
32	6	Ngare Kinywa	Kenya	50.26	
33	7	Orlando Ruano	Guatemala	50.39	
34	2	Lauwi Adjambao	Togo	50.47	
35	2	David Beylon	Kenya	50.50	
36	2	Nelson González	Guatemala	50.75	
37	3	E. N. Quargraine	Ghana	50.90	
38	5	Roberto Prado	Bolivia	51.23	
39	6	Ibrahim Rashed	Saudi Arabia	51.69	
40	7	Jorge Camacho	Costa Rica	51.92	
41	1	Fahad Abdullah	Saudi Arabia	52.56	
42	5	Miguel Banegas	Honduras	53.05	
43	6	Manuel Machado	Costa Rica	53.56	
44	6	José Guillermo Brenes	Honduras	55.30	
	7	Stefano Malinverni	Italy	DNF	

=== Semifinals ===
Rank	Heat	Athlete	Nationality	Time	Notes
1	1	Nikolay Chernetsky	Soviet Union	45.12	Q
2	2	Walter McCoy	United States	45.16	Q
3	2	Franz-Peter Hofmeister	West Germany	45.40	Q
4	3	Harald Schmid	West Germany	45.72	Q
5	2	Remigijus Valiulis	Soviet Union	45.73	q
6	1	Leslie Kerr	United States	45.79	Q
7	1	Horia Toboc	Romania	45.87	q
8	2	Koen Gijsbers	Netherlands	46.17	
9	2	Geraldo José Pegado	Brazil	46.18	
10	3	Robert Froissart	France	46.24	Q
11	3	Avognan Nogboum	Ivory Coast	46.25	
12	3	Roberto Tozzi	Italy	46.28	PB
13	3	Isidoro Hornillos	Spain	46.51	
14	2	Alan Bell	Great Britain	46.53	
15	1	Eiji Natori	Japan	46.64	
16	1	Marcel Klarenbeek	Netherlands	46.68	NJR
17	3	Rolf Gisler	Switzerland	46.76	
18	1	Jens Smedegaard	Denmark	46.89	
19	3	Takashi Nagao	Japan	47.49	
20	2	Genaro Iritia	Spain	47.61	
21	3	Alexander Fortelny	Austria	47.74	
22	2	Jean-Prosper Rajaonarison	Madagascar	47.83	
23	1	Lew Davis	Jamaica	48.62	
	1	Chum Darvall	Australia	DNS	

=== Final ===
Rank	Athlete	Nationality	Time	Notes
1st place, gold medalist(s)	Harald Schmid	West Germany	44.98	
2nd place, silver medalist(s)	Franz-Peter Hofmeister	West Germany	45.12	
3rd place, bronze medalist(s)	Walter McCoy	United States	45.90	
4	Leslie Kerr	United States	45.94	
5	Horia Toboc	Romania	46.56	
6	Remigijus Valiulis	Soviet Union	48.40	
	Nikolay Chernetskiy	Soviet Union	DNS	
	Robert Froissart	France	DNS	
