= Athletics at the 1980 Summer Olympics – Men's 4 × 400 metres relay =

Men's 4 × 400 metres relay at the Games of the XXII Olympiad
- Venue: Grand Arena of the Central Lenin Stadium
- Date: 31 July 1980 (round 1); 1 August 1980 (final)
- Competitors: 97 from 24 nations
- Teams: 97
- Winning time: 3:01.08

Medalists
1st place, gold medalist(s)		Remigijus Valiulis, Mikhail Linge, Nikolay Chernetskiy, Viktor Markin	Soviet Union
2nd place, silver medalist(s)		Klaus Thiele, Andreas Knebel, Frank Schaffer, Volker Beck	East Germany
3rd place, bronze medalist(s)		Stefano Malinverni, Mauro Zuliani, Roberto Tozzi, Pietro Mennea	Italy

These are the official results of the Men's 4 × 400 metre relay event at the 1980 Summer Olympics in Moscow, USSR. There were a total number of 24 nations competing. The top two in each heat and next two fastest advanced to the final.

== Final ==
- Held on Friday 1 August 1980

RANK	NATION	FINAL	TIME
	Soviet Union	• Remigijus Valiulis • Mikhail Linge • Nikolay Chernetskiy • Viktor Markin	3:01.08
	East Germany	• Klaus Thiele • Andreas Knebel • Frank Schaffer • Volker Beck	3:01.26
	Italy	• Stefano Malinverni • Mauro Zuliani • Roberto Tozzi • Pietro Mennea	3:04.54
4.	France	• Jacques Fellice • Robert Froissart • Didier Dubois • Francis Demarthon	3:04.8
5.	Brazil	• Paulo Correia • Antônio Dias Ferreira • Agberto Guimarães • Geraldo Pegado	3:05.9
6.	Trinidad and Tobago	• Joseph Coombs • Charles Joseph • Rafee Mohammed • Mike Solomon	3:06.6
7.	Czechoslovakia	• Josef Lomický • Dusan Malovec • František Břečka • Karel Kolář	3:07.0
8.	Great Britain	• Alan Bell • Terry Whitehead • Rod Milne • Glen Cohen	DNF

== Heats ==
- Held on Thursday 31 July 1980

RANK	NATION	HEAT 1	TIME
1.	Soviet Union	• Nikolay Chernetskiy • Mikhail Linge • Remigijus Valiulis • Viktor Burakov	3:01.8
2.	Brazil	• Paulo Correia • Antônio Dias Ferreira • Agberto Guimarães • Geraldo Pegado	3:04.9
3.	Yugoslavia	• Željko Knapić • Milovan Savić • Rok Kopitar • Josip Alebić	3:05.3
4.	Poland	• Jan Pawłowicz • Jerzy Pietrzyk • Adam Starostka • Andrzej Stępień	3:05.8
5.	Netherlands	• Henk Brouwer • Mario Westbroek • Marcel Klarenbeek • Harry Schulting	3:06.0
6.	Spain	• Isidoro Hornillos • Colomán Trabado • Benjamín González • José Casabona	3:06.9
7.	Zambia	• Charles Lupiya • Alston Muziyo • Archfell Musango • Davison Lishebo	3:14.9
8.	Sierra Leone	• William Akabi-Davis • Jimmy Massallay • Sahr Kendor • George Branche	3:25.0

RANK	NATION	HEAT 2	TIME
1.	East Germany	• Klaus Thiele • Andreas Knebel • Frank Schaffer • Volker Beck	3:03.4
2.	Czechoslovakia	• Josef Lomický • Dušan Malovec • František Břečka • Karel Kolář	3:03.5
3.	Italy	• Stefano Malinverni • Mauro Zuliani • Roberto Tozzi • Pietro Mennea	3:03.5
4.	Trinidad and Tobago	• Joseph Coombs • Mike Solomon • Rafer Mohammed • Charles Joseph	3:04.3
5.	Uganda	• Pius Olowo • Charles Dramiga • John Akii-Bua • Silver Ayoo	3:07.0
6.	Libya	• Bashir Al-Fellah • Salem El-Margini • Ahmed Seluma • Elmehdi Diab	3:16.7
7.	Ethiopia	• Besha Tuffa • Kumela Fituma • Asfaw Deble • Atre Bezabeh	3:18.2
—	Belgium	• Eddy de Leeuw • Danny Roelandt • Rik Vandenberghe • Alfons Brijdenbach	DNF

RANK	NATION	HEAT 3	TIME
1.	France	• Jacques Fellice • Robert Froissart • Didier Dubois • Francis Demarthon	3:05.4
2.	Great Britain	• Alan Bell • Terry Whitehead • Rod Milne • Glen Cohen	3:05.9
3.	Switzerland	• Rolf Strittmatter • Peter Haas • Rolf Gisler • Urs Kamber	3:07.2
4.	Iraq	• Hussain Ali Nasayyif • Ali Hassan Kadhum • Fahim Abdul Al-Sada • Abbas Murshid Al-Aibi	3:10.5
5.	Nigeria	• Sunday Uti • Hope Ezeigbo • Felix Imadiyi • Dele Udo	3:14.1
6.	Sri Lanka	• Samararatne Dharmasena • Kosala Sahabandu • Newton Perera • Appunidage Premachandra	3:14.4
7.	Seychelles	• Vincent Confait • Regis Tranquille • Marc La Rose • Casimir Pereira	3:19.2
—	Jamaica	• Derrick Peynado • Colin Bradford • Ian Stapleton • Bert Cameron	DNF

== See also ==
- 1976 Men's Olympic Games 4 × 400 m Relay (Montreal)
- 1978 Men's European Championships 4 × 400 m Relay (Prague)
- 1982 Men's European Championships 4 × 400 m Relay (Athens)
- 1983 Men's World Championships 4 × 400 m Relay (Helsinki)
- 1984 Men's Olympic Games 4 × 400 m Relay (Los Angeles)
