= Athletics at the 1979 Summer Universiade – Men's 4 × 400 metres relay =

The men's 4 × 400 metres relay event at the 1979 Summer Universiade was held at the Estadio Olimpico Universitario in Mexico City on 12 and 13 September 1979.

== Results ==
=== Heats ===
Rank	Heat	Nation	Athletes	Time	Notes
1	2	West Germany	Hans-Peter Ferner, Franz-Peter Hofmeister, Bernd Herrmann, Harald Schmid	3:03.64	Q
2	1	United States	Fred Taylor, Leslie Kerr, Ronnie Harris, Walter McCoy	3:04.12	Q
3	1	Netherlands	Hugo Pont, Koen Gijsbers, Marcel Klarenbeek, Harry Schulting	3:04.37	Q, NR
4	1	Italy	Alfonso Di Guida, Flavio Borghi, Stefano Malinverni, Roberto Tozzi	3:07.27	Q
5	1	Spain	Ángel Cruz, Jenaro Iritia, Benjamín González, Isidoro Hornillos	3:08.76	q
6	1	Switzerland	Rolf Gisler, Peter Haas, Franco Fähndrich, Thomas Wild	3:09.38	q
7	2	Brazil	Geraldo Pegado, Agberto Guimarães, Altevir de Araújo, Donizete Soares	3:10.58	Q
8	2	Jamaica	Leonard Smith, Lee Davis, Michael Feurtado, Floyd Brown	3:13.57	Q
9	2	Mexico	Ignacio Melesio, Erasmo Garca, David Martínez, Alfonso Pérez	3:16.39	
10	2	Togo	Lauwi Adjambao, Adodo Djobokou, Kossivi Attikpo, Yabaty Agbéré	3:18.51	
11	1	Guatemala	Emilio Eva, Nelson González, Orlando Ruano, Arturo Girón	3:19.90	
12	2	Honduras	Oscar Muñoz, José Flores, José Guillermo Brenes, Miguel Banegas	3:37.13	

=== Final ===
Rank	Nation	Athletes	Time	Notes
1st place, gold medalist(s)	United States	Fred Taylor, Leslie Kerr, Ronnie Harris, Walter McCoy	3:00.98	
2nd place, silver medalist(s)	Netherlands	Hugo Pont, Koen Gijsbers, Marcel Klarenbeek, Harry Schulting	3:03.18	NR
3rd place, bronze medalist(s)	Italy	Stefano Malinverni, Alfonso Di Guida, Flavio Borghi, Roberto Tozzi	3:03.80	NR
4	Spain	Ángel Cruz, José Casabona, Benjamín González, Isidoro Hornillos	3:04.22	NR
5	Switzerland	Rolf Gisler, Franco Fähndrich, Peter Haas, Thomas Wild	3:04.90	
6	Brazil	Geraldo Pegado, Agberto Guimarães, Altevir de Araújo, Milton de Castro	3:05.61	
7	Jamaica	Leonard Smith, Lee Davis, Michael Feurtado, Floyd Brown	3:12.04	
	West Germany		DNS	
