= Athletics at the 1979 Summer Universiade – Men's 4 × 100 metres relay =

The men's 4 × 100 metres relay event at the 1979 Summer Universiade was held at the Estadio Olimpico Universitario in Mexico City on 12 and 13 September 1979.

== Results ==
=== Heats ===
Rank	Heat	Nation	Athletes	Time	Notes
1	2	Italy	Gianfranco Lazzer, Luciano Caravani, Giovanni Grazioli, Pietro Mennea	38.55	Q, NR
2	2	Ivory Coast	Patrice Ouré, Avognan Nogboum, Amadou Meïté, Georges Kablan Degnan	39.34	Q
3	1	Congo	Antoine Kiakouama, Louis Nkanza, Théophile Nkounkou, Jean-Pierre Bassegela	39.54	Q
4	3	France	Jean Gracia, Pierrick Thessard, Gabriel Brothier, Pascal Barré	39.71	Q
5	3	Poland	Jan Alończyk, Leszek Dunecki, Kazimierz Grubecki, Jerzy Brunner	39.72	Q
6	2	Nigeria	Joshua Kio, Dele Udo, Hammed Adio, Kayode Elegbede	39.81	q
7	3	Japan	Toshio Kawashima, Eiji Natori, Junichi Usui, Akira Harada	39.94	q
8	1	Brazil	Milton de Castro, Geraldo José Pegado, Nelson dos Santos, Altevir de Araújo	40.10	Q
9	1	Hungary	Béla Bakosi, Jozsef Novobáczky, László Szalma, István Nagy	40.41	
10	3	Madagascar	Jean-Lalao Razafindranaivo, Jean-Joseph Randrianasolo, Jean-Prosper Rajaonarison, Lucien Ralaivita	41.16	
11	2	Mexico	Victor Velazco, Óscar Conde, Francisco Ramírez, Jesús Aguilasocho	41.39	
12	2	Gambia	Suleiman Fye, Banana Jarju, Bamba Njie, Oumar Fye	42.37	
13	3	Ghana	Ernest Obeng, Emmanuel Wiredu, George Enchill, E. N. Quargraine	42.58	
14	1	United States	Mike Roberson, Harvey Glance, Mel Lattany, Fred Taylor	42.82	
15	2	Guatemala	Javier Fernández, Nelson González, Orlando Ruano, Arturo Girón	43.71	
	2	Switzerland	Franco Fähndrich, Urs Gisler, ?, ?	DNF	

=== Final ===
Rank	Nation	Athletes	Time	Notes
1st place, gold medalist(s)	Italy	Gianfranco Lazzer, Luciano Caravani, Giovanni Grazioli, Pietro Mennea	38.42	UR, =AR
2nd place, silver medalist(s)	Ivory Coast	Patrice Ouré, Amadou Meïté, Avognan Nogboum, Georges Kablan Degnan	38.73	AR
3rd place, bronze medalist(s)	France	Jean Gracia, Pierrick Thessard, Gabriel Brothier, Pascal Barré	39.07	
4	Poland	Jan Alończyk, Leszek Dunecki, Kazimierz Grubecki, Jerzy Brunner	39.33	
5	Nigeria	Joshua Kio, Hammed Adio, Dele Udo, Kayode Elegbede	39.90	
6	Japan	Toshio Kawashima, Eiji Natori, Junichi Usui, Akira Harada	39.94	
7	Congo	Antoine Kiakouama, Louis Nkanza, Théophile Nkounkou, Jean-Pierre Bassegela	40.74	
8	Brazil	Milton de Castro, Geraldo José Pegado, Nelson dos Santos, Altevir de Araújo	42.82	
