= Athletics at the 1979 Summer Universiade – Men's 200 metres =

The men's 200 metres event at the 1979 Summer Universiade was held at the Estadio Olimpico Universitario in Mexico City on 10, 11 and 12 September 1979.

== Medalists ==
Gold	Silver	Bronze
Pietro Mennea; Italy	Leszek Dunecki; Poland	Ainsley Bennett; Great Britain

== Results ==
=== Heats ===
Wind:
Heat 1: +0.1 m/s, Heat 2: +1.6 m/s, Heat 3: 0.0 m/s, Heat 4: +0.5 m/s, Heat 5: +1.3 m/s
Heat 6: +0.7 m/s, Heat 7: +0.1 m/s, Heat 8: +2.3 m/s, Heat 9: +0.2 m/s

Rank	Heat	Athlete	Nationality	Time	Notes
1	9	Pietro Mennea	Italy	19.96	Q, UR, AR
2	4	Altevir de Araújo	Brazil	20.55	Q
2	5	Otis Melvin	United States	20.55	Q
4	8	Ainsley Bennett	Great Britain	20.66	Q
5	4	Georges Kablan Degnan	Ivory Coast	20.71	Q
6	2	Jens Smedegaard	Denmark	20.76	Q
7	4	Viktor Burakov	Soviet Union	20.83	q
8	8	Boubacar Diallo	Senegal	20.84	Q
9	8	Tomás González	Cuba	20.89	q
10	2	Andrey Shlyapnikov	Soviet Union	20.91	Q
11	1	Su Mal-guh	South Korea	20.94	Q
12	1	Roland Bombardella	Luxembourg	20.95	Q
13	9	Peter Muster	Switzerland	21.01	Q
14	7	Floyd Brown	Jamaica	21.04	Q
15	5	Frank van Doorn	Canada	21.05	Q
16	6	Leszek Dunecki	Poland	21.06	Q
17	9	Yasuhiro Harada	Japan	21.09	q
18	2	Patrice Ouré	Ivory Coast	21.11	q
19	3	Georgios Vamvakas	Greece	21.14	Q
20	5	István Nagy	Hungary	21.15	q
21	7	Patrick Wamister	Switzerland	21.16	Q
22	3	Charles Pickens	United States	21.21	Q
23	1	Kazimierz Grubecki	Poland	21.33	q
24	6	Ángel Cruz	Spain	21.48	Q
25	7	Marcel Klarenbeek	Netherlands	21.49	PB
26	3	Akira Harada	Japan	21.54	
27	7	Jean Gracia	France	21.56	
28	6	Daniel Biocchi	Canada	21.58	
29	3	Sabidou Touré	Senegal	21.64	
30	8	Lucien Ralaivita	Madagascar	21.65	
31	8	Nicos Hadjinicolau	Cyprus	21.65	
32	9	Benjamín González	Spain	21.71	
33	7	Alan Bell	Great Britain	21.74	
34	5	Vilmundur Vilhjálmsson	Iceland	21.82	
35	6	Antonis Georgallidis	Cyprus	22.01	
36	8	Francisco Ramírez	Mexico	22.02	
37	9	Marco Mautinho	Peru	22.11	
38	3	Sergio Barajas	Mexico	22.15	
39	6	José Luis Valverde	Peru	22.22	
39	9	Jean-Jacques Randrianasolo	Madagascar	22.22	
41	5	Ernest Obeng	Ghana	22.23	
42	1	Konlan Martelot	Togo	22.37	
43	5	Sheikh Omar Faye	Gambia	22.41	
44	2	Kossi Adolo Djobokou	Togo	22.43	
45	2	Cheung Lai Chi	Hong Kong	22.56	
45	8	Javier Fernández	Guatemala	22.56	
47	4	Sulayman Faye	Gambia	22.76	
48	2	Nelson González	Guatemala	22.87	
49	5	Oscar Muñoz	Honduras	22.89	
50	4	Roberto Prado	Bolivia	22.91	
51	1	Ehsan Salih	Saudi Arabia	23.05	
52	6	Marco Luque	Bolivia	23.05	
53	1	José Flores	Honduras	23.28	
54	6	Mordhi Abdulhakim	Saudi Arabia	23.75	
55	3	Clifford Maseko	Swaziland	24.05	
	9	Louis Nkanza	Congo	DNS	

=== Semifinals ===
Wind:
Heat 1: 0.0 m/s, Heat 2: 0.0 m/s, Heat 3: 0.0 m/s

Rank	Heat	Athlete	Nationality	Time	Notes
1	1	Pietro Mennea	Italy	20.04	Q
2	2	Altevir de Araújo	Brazil	20.46	Q
3	1	Leszek Dunecki	Poland	20.48	Q, NR
4	1	Ainsley Bennett	Great Britain	20.67	q
5	3	Jens Smedegaard	Denmark	20.69	Q
6	3	Otis Melvin	United States	20.74	Q
7	2	Georges Kablan Degnan	Ivory Coast	20.78	Q
8	2	Viktor Burakov	Soviet Union	20.90	q
9	2	Su Mal-guh	South Korea	20.91	
10	2	Floyd Brown	Jamaica	20.92	
11	1	Andrey Shlyapnikov	Soviet Union	20.95	
12	1	Peter Muster	Switzerland	21.04	
13	3	Patrice Ouré	Ivory Coast	21.07	
14	2	István Nagy	Hungary	21.09	
14	3	Frank van Doorn	Canada	21.09	
16	3	Roland Bombardella	Luxembourg	21.10	
17	1	Georgios Vamvakas	Greece	21.13	
18	3	Patrick Wamister	Switzerland	21.14	
19	1	Charles Pickens	United States	21.18	
19	3	Tomás González	Cuba	21.18	
21	1	Boubacar Diallo	Senegal	21.23	
21	2	Kazimierz Grubecki	Poland	21.33	
23	2	Yasuhiro Harada	Japan	21.37	
24	3	Ángel Cruz	Spain	21.56	

=== Final ===
Wind: +1.8 m/s

Rank	Lane	Athlete	Nationality	Time	Notes
1st place, gold medalist(s)	4	Pietro Mennea	Italy	19.72	WR
2nd place, silver medalist(s)	1	Leszek Dunecki	Poland	20.24	NR
3rd place, bronze medalist(s)	8	Ainsley Bennett	Great Britain	20.42	
4	6	Altevir de Araújo	Brazil	20.43	NR
5	5	Jens Smedegaard	Denmark	20.52	NR
6	2	Viktor Burakov	Soviet Union	20.74	
7	3	Georges Kablan Degnan	Ivory Coast	20.88	
8	7	Otis Melvin	United States	22.97	
