= Athletics at the 1979 Summer Universiade – Men's 100 metres =

The men's 100 metres event at the 1979 Summer Universiade was held at the Estadio Olimpico Universitario in Mexico City on 8 and 9 September 1979.

== Medalists ==
Gold	Silver	Bronze
Mike Roberson; United States	Leszek Dunecki; Poland	Ainsley Bennett; Great Britain

== Results ==
=== Heats ===
Held on 8 September

Wind:
Heat 1: +0.6 m/s, Heat 2: +0.7 m/s, Heat 3: +0.8 m/s, Heat 4: 0.0 m/s, Heat 5: +0.1 m/s, Heat 6: 0.0 m/s, Heat 7: +0.2 m/s

Rank	Heat	Athlete	Nationality	Time	Notes
1	2	Mike Roberson	United States	10.08	Q, =UR
2	7	Nelson Rocha dos Santos	Brazil	10.22	Q
3	7	Ainsley Bennett	Great Britain	10.23	Q
4	1	Mel Lattany	United States	10.25	Q
5	3	Leszek Dunecki	Poland	10.28	Q
6	3	Pascal Barré	France	10.32	Q
6	4	Aleksandr Aksinin	Soviet Union	10.32	Q
8	7	Amadou Meïté	Ivory Coast	10.33	Q
9	1	Su Mal-guh	South Korea	10.34	Q
10	7	Floyd Brown	Jamaica	10.34	q
11	6	Gianfranco Lazzer	Italy	10.35	Q
12	5	Luciano Caravani	Italy	10.40	Q
13	5	Théophile Nkounkou	Congo	10.41	Q
13	7	Roland Bombardella	Luxembourg	10.41	q, NR
15	5	Andrey Shlyapnikov	Soviet Union	10.42	Q
16	1	Georges Kablan Degnan	Ivory Coast	10.45	Q
17	4	Gabriel Brothier	France	10.47	Q
18	4	Milton de Castro	Brazil	10.48	Q
19	2	Yasuhiro Harada	Japan	10.50	Q
19	6	Franco Fähndrich	Switzerland	10.50	Q
21	2	Jerzy Brunner	Poland	10.52	Q
22	6	István Nagy	Hungary	10.55	Q
23	1	Frank van Doorn	Canada	10.56	q
24	5	Urs Gisler	Switzerland	10.57	
25	6	Tomás González	Cuba	10.58	
26	1	Akira Harada	Japan	10.59	
27	7	Alfredo Melão	Angola	10.63	
28	4	Sory Sangare	Senegal	10.67	
28	6	Jean-Pierre Bassegela	Congo	10.67	
30	6	Georgios Vamvakas	Greece	10.69	
31	1	Adille Sumariwalla	India	10.72	
31	7	Daniel Biocchi	Canada	10.72	
33	7	Víctor Velasco	Mexico	10.78	
34	2	Nicos Hadjinicolau	Cyprus	10.80	
35	3	Sabidou Touré	Senegal	10.83	Q
35	4	Lucien Ralaivita	Madagascar	10.83	
37	3	Vilmundur Vilhjálmsson	Iceland	10.84	
38	2	Jean-Jacques Randrianasolo	Madagascar	10.89	
39	4	Emilio Eva Moss	Guatemala	10.98	
40	4	Jesús Aguilasocho	Mexico	10.98	
41	3	Sheikh Omar Faye	Gambia	11.05	
41	5	Marco Mautinho	Peru	11.05	
43	2	Emmanuel Wiredu	Ghana	11.18	
44	3	Cheung Lai Chi	Hong Kong	11.20	
45	1	Konlan Martelot	Togo	11.24	
46	2	Suleiman Fye	Gambia	11.28	
46	3	George Enchill	Ghana	11.28	
48	3	Ehsan Salih	Saudi Arabia	11.31	
49	6	Marco Luque	Bolivia	11.35	
50	1	José Flores	Honduras	11.42	
51	4	José Luis Elias	Peru	11.63	
52	5	Clifford Maseko	Swaziland	11.75	
53	2	Oscar Muñoz	Honduras	11.87	
54	5	Mohamed Saleh Al-Balkheer	Saudi Arabia	11.93	

=== Semifinals ===
Held on 9 September

Wind:
Heat 1: +0.6 m/s, Heat 2: +0.8 m/s, Heat 3: +0.6 m/s

Rank	Heat	Athlete	Nationality	Time	Notes
1	1	Mike Roberson	United States	10.07	Q, UR
2	3	Ainsley Bennett	Great Britain	10.21	Q
3	3	Luciano Caravani	Italy	10.23	Q
4	1	Théophile Nkounkou	Congo	10.28	Q
4	2	Leszek Dunecki	Poland	10.28	Q
4	3	Mel Lattany	United States	10.28	q
7	1	Pascal Barré	France	10.29	q
8	2	Nelson Rocha dos Santos	Brazil	10.33	Q
9	3	Andrey Shlyapnikov	Soviet Union	10.34	
10	3	Floyd Brown	Jamaica	10.35	
11	2	Gianfranco Lazzer	Italy	10.40	
12	1	Aleksandr Aksinin	Soviet Union	10.41	
13	1	Su Mal-guh	South Korea	10.43	
13	3	Milton de Castro	Brazil	10.43	PB
15	1	Franco Fähndrich	Switzerland	10.44	
16	2	Amadou Meïté	Ivory Coast	10.44	
17	2	Roland Bombardella	Luxembourg	10.45	
18	1	Georges Kablan Degnan	Ivory Coast	10.46	
19	1	István Nagy	Hungary	10.53	
20	2	Frank van Doorn	Canada	10.56	
21	2	Yasuhiro Harada	Japan	10.59	
22	2	Gabriel Brothier	France	10.62	
23	3	Sabidou Touré	Senegal	10.79	
	3	Jerzy Brunner	Poland	?	

=== Final ===
Held on 9 September

Wind: 0.0 m/s

Rank	Athlete	Nationality	Time	Notes
1st place, gold medalist(s)	Mike Roberson	United States	10.19	
2nd place, silver medalist(s)	Leszek Dunecki	Poland	10.30	
3rd place, bronze medalist(s)	Ainsley Bennett	Great Britain	10.38	
4	Pascal Barré	France	10.40	
5	Théophile Nkounkou	Congo	10.41	
6	Luciano Caravani	Italy	10.46	
7	Mel Lattany	United States	10.50	
	Nelson Rocha dos Santos	Brazil	DNS	
