= Altevir de Araújo =

Brazilian sprinter and long jumper

Personal information
- Born: December 23, 1955 (age 70)

Sport
- Sport: Track and field
Medal record
Representing Brazil
Pan American Games
Bronze medal – third place	1979 San Juan	4×100m relay

Altevir Silva de Araújo Filho (born December 23, 1955) is a retired sprinter from Brazil, he was a Brazilian champion, but he was best known for winning two gold medals (100 and 200 metres) at the 1979 South American Championships in Bucaramanga, Colombia.

He represented his native country at the 1980 Summer Olympics, where he was eliminated in the second round of the men's 200 metres. In the same tournament he finished in 8th place with the men's relay team in the 4×100 metres, alongside Milton de Castro, Nelson Rocha dos Santos, and Katsuhiko Nakaya.

== International competitions ==
Year	Competition	Venue	Position	Event	Notes
Representing Brazil
1979	Pan American Games	San Juan, Puerto Rico	4th	200 m	20.60
1979	Pan American Games	San Juan, Puerto Rico	3rd	4 × 100 m relay	39.44
1979	Pan American Games	San Juan, Puerto Rico	4th	Long jump	7.73 m
1979	Universiade	Mexico City, Mexico	4th	200 m	20.43
1979	Universiade	Mexico City, Mexico	8th	4 × 100 m relay	42.82
1979	Universiade	Mexico City, Mexico	6th	4 × 400 m relay	3:05.61
1979	World Cup	Montreal, Canada	1st	4 × 100 m relay	38.70^{1}
1979	South American Championships	Bucaramanga, Colombia	1st	100 m	10.1
1979	South American Championships	Bucaramanga, Colombia	1st	200 m	20.5
1979	South American Championships	Bucaramanga, Colombia	2nd	4 × 100 m relay	40.2
1980	Olympic Games	Moscow, Soviet Union	22nd (qf)	200 m	21.22
1980	Olympic Games	Moscow, Soviet Union	8th	4 × 100 m relay	39.54
1981	South American Championships	La Paz, Bolivia	2nd	100 m	10.3
1981	South American Championships	La Paz, Bolivia	1st	4 × 100 m relay	39.6

^{1}Representing the Americas

== Personal bests ==
Outdoor

- 100 metres – 10.28 (Santiago de Chile 1979)
- 200 metres – 20.43 (+1.8 m/s, Mexico City 1979)
- Long jump – 7.87 (Rio de Janeiro 1978)
