= Athletics at the 1979 Pan American Games – Men's 4 × 100 metres relay =

Men's 4 × 100 metres relay at the 1979 Pan American Games
- Venue: Estadio Sixto Escobar
- Dates: 14 July
- Winning time: 38.85

Medalists
Gold medal	Mike Roberson, Harvey Glance, Cliff Wiley, Steve Riddick	United States
Silver medal	Osvaldo Lara, Alejandro Casañas, Silvio Leonard, Juan Saborit	Cuba
Bronze medal	Milton de Castro, Nelson dos Santos, Rui da Silva, Altevir de Araújo	Brazil

The men's 4 × 100 metres relay competition of the athletics events at the 1979 Pan American Games took place at the Estadio Sixto Escobar. The defending Pan American Games champion was the United States team.

== Records ==
Prior to this competition, the existing world and Pan American Games records were as follows:

World record	United States	38.03	Düsseldorf, West Germany	September 3, 1977
Pan American Games record	United States	38.31	Mexico City, Mexico	1975

== Results ==
KEY:	WR	World Record	GR	Pan American Record

=== Final ===
Held on 14 July

Rank	Competitors	Nation	Time	Notes
1st place, gold medalist(s)	United States	Mike Roberson, Harvey Glance, Cliff Wiley, Steve Riddick	38.85	
2nd place, silver medalist(s)	Cuba	Osvaldo Lara, Alejandro Casañas, Silvio Leonard, Juan Saborit	39.14	
3rd place, bronze medalist(s)	Brazil	Milton de Castro, Nelson dos Santos, Rui da Silva, Altevir de Araújo	39.44	
4	Jamaica	George Walcott, Colin Bradford, Don Quarrie, Oliver Heywood	39.83	
5	Canada	Tony Sharpe, Desai Williams, Hugh Spooner, Marvin Nash	39.92	
6	Puerto Rico	Luis Alers, Jesús Cabrera, Iván Mangual, Wilfredo Molina	40.28	
7	Trinidad and Tobago	Edwin Noel, Ephraim Serrette, Linton Williams, Hasely Crawford	40.44	
	Dominican Republic	Mariano Reyes, Francisco Solis, Rafael Félix, Gerardo Suero	DQ	
