= 1981 European Athletics Indoor Championships – Men's 400 metres =

The men's 400 metres event at the 1981 European Athletics Indoor Championships was held on 21 and 22 February.

== Medalists ==
Gold	Silver	Bronze
Andreas Knebel; East Germany	Martin Weppler; West Germany	Stefano Malinverni; Italy

== Results ==
=== Heats ===
First 2 from each heat (Q) qualified directly for the semifinals.

Rank	Heat	Name	Nationality	Time	Notes
1	1	Dinko Penev	Bulgaria	47.58	Q
2	2	Andreas Knebel	East Germany	47.86	Q
3	1	Didier Dubois	France	47.93	Q
4	2	Martin Weppler	West Germany	48.11	Q
5	3	Jacques Fellice	France	48.17	Q
6	3	Koen Gijsbers	Netherlands	48.21	Q, NR
7	3	Ainsley Bennett	Great Britain	48.23	
8	2	Benjamín González	Spain	48.37	
9	4	Stefano Malinverni	Italy	48.44	Q
10	4	Paul Bourdin	France	48.49	Q
11	4	Rolf Gisler	Switzerland	48.86	
12	1	Roberto Ribaud	Italy	49.53	
	1	Hartmut Weber	West Germany	DNF	

=== Semifinals ===
First 2 from each semifinal qualified directly (Q) for the final.

Rank	Heat	Name	Nationality	Time	Notes
1	2	Andreas Knebel	East Germany	47.10	Q
2	2	Paul Bourdin	France	47.43	Q
3	2	Didier Dubois	France	47.68	
4	1	Martin Weppler	West Germany	48.04	Q
5	2	Koen Gijsbers	Netherlands	48.23	
6	1	Stefano Malinverni	Italy	48.27	Q
7	1	Dinko Penev	Bulgaria	48.50	
8	1	Jacques Fellice	France	48.61	

=== Final ===
Rank	Lane	Name	Nationality	Time	Notes
1st place, gold medalist(s)	2	Andreas Knebel	East Germany	46.52	
2nd place, silver medalist(s)	1	Martin Weppler	West Germany	46.88	
3rd place, bronze medalist(s)	3	Stefano Malinverni	Italy	46.96	
4	4	Paul Bourdin	France	47.69	
