= Athletics at the West African University Games =

The athletics competition at the West African University Games has featured at all editions since the first in 1965. the most recent edition of the competition was the 14th, held in 2018.

A limited number of athletics medallists are known from the competitions.

== Men's champions ==
=== 100 metres ===
- 1977: Bernard Oulassé (CIV)
- 1981: Barthélémy Koffi (CIV)
- 1989: Hyacinthe Kamélan (CIV)

=== 200 metres ===
- 1977: Georges Kablan Degnan (CIV)
- 1981: Bernard Oulassé (CIV)
- 1989: Hyacinthe Kamélan (CIV)

=== 400 metres ===
- 1977: Georges Kablan Degnan (CIV)
- 1981: Emmanuel Bitanga (CMR)
- 1989: Hachim Ndiaye (SEN)

=== 800 metres ===
- 1977: Dramane Diarrassouba (CIV)
- 1981: N'Drin Gnandjué (CIV)
- 1989: Ismail Raji (NGR)

=== 1500 metres ===
- 1977: ?. Yaya (CIV)
- 1981: Kouakou Menzan (CIV)
- 1989: Ismail Raji (NGR)

=== 5000 metres ===
- 1977: Daniel Kouassi (CIV)
- 1981: Mohamed Kolo (NGR)
- 1989: John Tizhe (NGR)

=== 10,000 metres ===
- 1989: Améwouho Atsou (TOG)

=== 3000 metres steeplechase ===
- 1989: Boukary Ouédraogo (BUR)

=== 110 metres hurdles ===
- 1977: Ofori Henaku (GHA)
- 1981: Barthélémy Niodogo (CIV)
- 1989: Kojo Arko Duodu (GHA)

=== 400 metres hurdles ===
- 1977: Albert Ghummey (GHA)
- 1981: Michael Ojo (NGR)
- 1989: Théodore Zoumbaboué (CIV)

=== High jump ===
- 1977: Albert Ghummey (GHA)
- 1981: Michael Ojo (NGR)
- 1989: Théodore Zoumbaboué (CIV)

=== Pole vault ===
- 1977: Jimmy Kouakou N'Dri (CIV)
- 1981: Loué Legbo (CIV)

=== Long jump ===
- 1977: Essodina Atchadé (TOG)
- 1981: Joshua Kio (NGR)
- 1989: Anthony Chukwu (NGR)

=== Triple jump ===
- 1977: ?. Kosei (GHA)
- 1981: Joshua Kio (NGR)
- 1989: Patrick Gyan (GHA)

=== Shot put ===
- 1977: Oumarou Poro (CMR)
- 1981: Lohouri Tapé (CIV)
- 1989: Alhassan Yakmut (NGR)

=== Discus throw ===
- 1977: Tiékité Somet (CIV)
- 1981: Lohouri Tapé (CIV)
- 1989: Alassane Neya (BUR)

=== Javelin throw ===
- 1977: Emanuel Okunte (NGR)
- 1981: Agbodan Atchontchon (TOG)
- 1989: John Ukaegbu (NGR)

=== 4 × 100 metres relay ===
- 1977: Abidjan University (CIV)
- 1981: Ivory Coast (CIV)
- 1989: Ivory Coast (CIV)

=== 4 × 400 metres relay ===
- 1977: Abidjan University (CIV)
- 1981: Ivory Coast (CIV)
- 1989: University of Ife (NGR)

== Women's champions ==
=== 100 metres ===
- 1977: Kemi Sandgodeyi (NGR)
- 1981: Elizabeth Mokogwu (NGR)
- 1989: Aminata Konaté (GUI)

=== 200 metres ===
- 1977: Gloria Ayanlaja (NGR)
- 1981: Elizabeth Mokogwu (NGR)
- 1989: Ndèye Aminata Niang (SEN)

=== 400 metres ===
- 1977: Célestine N'Drin (CIV)
- 1981: Gloria Ayanlaja (NGR)
- 1989: Fatimata Podié (BUR)

=== 800 metres ===
- 1977: Célestine N'Drin (CIV)
- 1981: Gloria Ayanlaja (NGR)
- 1989: Ngozi Ohaechesi (NGR)

=== 1500 metres ===
- 1981: Solange Allingra (CIV)
- 1989: Ngozi Ohaechesi (NGR)

=== 3000 metres ===
- 1989: Ngozi Ohaechesi (NGR)

=== 110 metres hurdles ===
- 1977: Kemi Sandgodeyi (NGR)
- 1981: Cécile Ngambi (CMR)
- 1989: Salimata Coulibaly (CIV)

=== 400 metres hurdles ===
- 1989: Fatimata Podié (BUR)

=== High jump ===
- 1977: R. Agbeja (NGR)
- 1981: Cécile Ngambi (CMR)
- 1989: Salimata Coulibaly (CIV)

=== Long jump ===
- 1977: Kemi Sandgodeyi (NGR)
- 1981: Albertine Koutouan (CIV)
- 1989: Justina Ukasaunya (NGR)

=== Shot put ===
- 1977: Lucie Vabré (CIV)
- 1981: Grace Apiafi (NGR)
- 1989: Mariam Ibekwe (NGR)

=== Discus throw ===
- 1977: R. Kayode (NGR)
- 1981: Grace Apiafi (NGR)
- 1989: Ann Otutu (NGR)

=== Javelin throw ===
- 1977: Agnès Tchuinté (CMR)
- 1981: Ténin Camara (CIV)
- 1989: Ann Otutu (NGR)

=== 4 × 100 metres relay ===
- 1977: University of Ife (NGR)
- 1981: Cameroon (CMR)
- 1989: University of Ife (NGR)

=== 4 × 400 metres relay ===
- 1981: University of Ife (NGR)
- 1989: University of Ife (NGR)
