= Geraldo José Pegado =

Brazilian sprinter

Personal information
- Born: 23 November 1954 (age 71) Rio de Janeiro, Brazil
- Height: 1.85 m (6 ft 1 in)
- Weight: 73 kg (161 lb)

Sport
- Sport: Sprinting
- Event: 400 metres

Geraldo José Pegado (born 23 November 1954) is a Brazilian sprinter. He competed in the men's 400 metres at the 1980 Summer Olympics. He was eliminated in round one when he came last in heat seven.

== International competitions ==
Year	Competition	Venue	Position	Event	Notes
Representing Brazil
1979	Pan American Games	San Juan, Puerto Rico	5th	4 × 400 m relay	3:10.9
1979	Universiade	Mexico City, Mexico	9th (sf)	400 m	46.18
1979	Universiade	Mexico City, Mexico	8th	4 × 100 m relay	42.82
1979	Universiade	Mexico City, Mexico	6th	4 × 400 m relay	3:05.61
1979	South American Championships	Bucaramanga, Colombia	1st	400 m	46.20
1979	South American Championships	Bucaramanga, Colombia	2nd	4 × 100 m relay	40.2
1979	South American Championships	Bucaramanga, Colombia	3rd	4 × 400 m relay	3:10.5
1980	Olympic Games	Moscow, Soviet Union	38th (h)	400 m	48.71
1980	Olympic Games	Moscow, Soviet Union	5th	4 × 400 m relay	3:05.9
1981	South American Championships	La Paz, Bolivia	1st	400 m	46.8
1981	South American Championships	La Paz, Bolivia	1st	4 × 400 m relay	3:09.5

== Personal bests ==
Outdoor

- 400 metres – 46.0 h (São Paulo 1980)
- 400 metres – 46.18 A (Mexico City 1979)
