= Athletics at the 1980 Summer Olympics – Men's 400 metres =

Men's 400 metres at the Games of the XXII Olympiad
- Venue: Central Lenin Stadium
- Dates: 27 July 1980 (heats); 28 July 1980 (quarter-finals and semi-finals); 30 July 1980 (final)
- Competitors: 50 from 32 nations
- Winning time: 44.60

Medalists
1st place, gold medalist(s)		Viktor Markin; Soviet Union
2nd place, silver medalist(s)		Rick Mitchell; Australia
3rd place, bronze medalist(s)		Frank Schaffer; East Germany

The men's 400 metres was an event at the 1980 Summer Olympics in Moscow. The competition was held from July 27 to July 30, 1980. Fifty athletes from 32 nations competed. The maximum number of athletes per nation had been set at three since the 1930 Olympic Congress. The event was won by 0.24 seconds by Viktor Markin of the Soviet Union, the nation's first title in the men's 400 metres and first medal in the event since 1956. With the United States boycotting the Games, the country was not represented on the podium for the first time since 1920. Australia earned its first medal in the event with Rick Mitchell's silver, while East Germany won its first medal with Frank Schaffer's bronze, which was the first medal by any German since the United Team took silvers in 1956 and 1960.

== Background ==
This was the nineteenth appearance of the event, which is one of 12 athletics events to have been held at every Summer Olympics. Defending gold medalist from 1976 Alberto Juantorena of Cuba returned to try to repeat without competition from the Americans, but with an Achilles tendon injury from 1979. Other returning finalists were fourth-place finisher Fons Brijdenbach of Belgium, sixth-place finisher Rick Mitchell of Australia, and seventh-place finisher David Jenkins of Great Britain. The field was relatively open, with no clear favorite.

Botswana, Guinea, Laos, Libya, the Seychelles, Sierra Leone, and Syria appeared in this event for the first time. Great Britain made its seventeenth appearance in the event, most of any present in Moscow but still one behind the United States at 18.

== Competition format ==
The competition retained the basic four-round format from 1920. The "fastest loser" system, introduced in 1964, was available but not used because there were eight first-round heats, making for even advancement. Each heat has six or seven runners, with the top four advancing. The four quarterfinals each had eight runners; the top four athletes in each quarterfinal heat advanced to the semifinals, with no "fastest loser" spots. The semifinals featured two heats of eight runners each. The top four runners in each semifinal heat advanced, making an eight-man final.

== Records ==
These were the standing world and Olympic records (in seconds) prior to the 1976 Summer Olympics.

World record	Lee Evans (USA)	43.86	Mexico City, Mexico	18 October 1968
Olympic record	Lee Evans (USA)	43.86	Mexico City, Mexico	18 October 1968

No world or Olympic records were set during this event.

== Schedule ==
The quarterfinals were moved to the second day (along with the semifinals) after one time on the first day in 1976.

All times are Moscow Time (UTC+3)

Date	Time	Round
Sunday, 27 July 1980	11:30	Round 1
Monday, 28 July 1980	11:00; 19:30	Quarterfinals; Semifinals
Wednesday, 30 July 1980	18:40	Final

== Results ==
=== Round 1 ===
Eight Round One heats were held at the Lenin Stadium on Sunday, 27 July 1980. The first four in each heat progressed to the quarterfinals.

==== Heat 1 ====
Rank	Lane	Athlete	Nation	Time	Notes
1	6	David Jenkins	Great Britain	46.67	Q
2	5	Karel Kolář	Czechoslovakia	47.26	Q
3	2	Francis Demarthon	France	47.43	Q
4	3	Eddy De Leeuw	Belgium	47.59	Q
5	7	Charles Dramiga	Uganda	48.69	
6	4	Asfaw Deble	Ethiopia	49.77	
—	—	Constantino Reis	Mozambique	DNS	

==== Heat 2 ====
Rank	Lane	Athlete	Nation	Time	Notes
1	1	Bert Cameron	Jamaica	47.54	Q
2	3	Didier Dubois	France	47.57	Q
3	4	Silver Ayoo	Uganda	47.78	Q
4	6	Charles Lupiya	Zambia	48.49	Q
5	7	Horia Toboc	Romania	49.90	
6	2	Léopold Hounkanrin	Benin	51.04	
7	5	Joseph Ramotshabi	Botswana	51.49	

==== Heat 3 ====
Rank	Lane	Athlete	Nation	Time	Notes
1	1	Dele Udo	Nigeria	46.48	Q
2	7	Joseph Coombs	Trinidad and Tobago	46.55	Q
3	3	Rick Mitchell	Australia	46.63	Q
4	5	Jens Smedegaard Hansen	Denmark	47.01	Q
5	4	Jimmy Massallay	Sierra Leone	49.68	
6	6	El-Mehdi Sallah Diab	Libya	49.89	
7	2	Panh Khemanith	Laos	53.74	

==== Heat 4 ====
Rank	Lane	Athlete	Nation	Time	Notes
1	4	Derrick Peynado	Jamaica	47.37	Q
2	3	Fons Brydenbach	Belgium	47.72	Q
3	1	Andrzej Stępień	Poland	47.99	Q
4	2	Glen Cohen	Great Britain	48.35	Q
5	6	Régis Tranquille	Seychelles	49.34	
6	5	Mohamed Diakité	Guinea	49.59	
—	—	Emmanuel Bitanga	Cameroon	DNS	

==== Heat 5 ====
Rank	Lane	Athlete	Nation	Time	Notes
1	3	Viktor Markin	Soviet Union	46.88	Q
2	1	Mike Solomon	Trinidad and Tobago	47.24	Q
3	6	Hope Ezeigbo	Nigeria	47.46	Q
4	4	Jacques Borlée	Belgium	47.77	Q
5	2	Mohamed El-Abed	Syria	50.47	
6	5	Sahr Kendor	Sierra Leone	52.98	
—	—	Koen Gijsbers	Netherlands	DNS	

==== Heat 6 ====
Rank	Lane	Athlete	Nation	Time	Notes
1	4	Jozo Alebić	Yugoslavia	47.61	Q
2	2	Stefano Malinverni	Italy	47.63	Q
3	3	Ian Stapleton	Jamaica	47.97	Q
4	6	Hussain Ali Nasayyif	Iraq	48.03	Q
5	5	Harry Schulting	Netherlands	48.53	
6	1	William Akabi-Davis	Sierra Leone	50.80	
—	—	Ramyan al-Ramian	Kuwait	DNS	

==== Heat 7 ====
Rank	Lane	Athlete	Nation	Time	Notes
1	7	Frank Schaffer	East Germany	46.13	Q
2	5	Viktor Burakov	Soviet Union	46.41	Q
3	4	Alberto Juantorena	Cuba	46.69	Q
4	3	Roberto Tozzi	Italy	47.01	Q
5	6	Jerzy Pietrzyk	Poland	47.18	
6	1	Geraldo José Pegado	Brazil	48.71	
—	—	Ruben Inacio	Angola	DNS	
—	—	Boubacar Diallo	Senegal	DNS	

==== Heat 8 ====
Rank	Lane	Athlete	Nation	Time	Notes
1	6	Nikolay Chernetskiy	Soviet Union	47.04	Q
2	2	Mauro Zuliani	Italy	47.16	Q
3	3	Marcel Klarenbeek	Netherlands	47.67	Q
4	7	Alan Bell	Great Britain	47.38	Q
5	5	Oddur Sigurðsson	Iceland	47.39	
6	1	Isidoro Hornillos	Spain	47.45	
—	—	Christer Gullstrand	Sweden	DNS	

=== Quarterfinals ===
The quarterfinals were held on 28 July 1980. The top four in each heat advanced to the semifinals.

==== Quarterfinal 1 ====
Rank	Lane	Athlete	Nation	Time	Notes
1	7	Rick Mitchell	Australia	45.73	Q
2	6	Fons Brijdenbach	Belgium	45.88	Q
3	2	Jens Smedegaard Hansen	Denmark	45.89	Q
4	1	Dele Udo	Nigeria	46.18	Q
5	4	Francis Demarthon	France	46.38	
6	3	Jozo Alebić	Yugoslavia	46.60	
7	5	Charles Lupiya	Zambia	47.67	
8	8	Stefano Malinverni	Italy	47.79	

==== Quarterfinal 2 ====
Rank	Lane	Athlete	Nation	Time	Notes
1	2	Viktor Markin	Soviet Union	45.58	Q
2	4	Joseph Coombs	Trinidad and Tobago	45.81	Q
3	1	Mauro Zuliani	Italy	45.93	Q
4	3	Alan Bell	Great Britain	46.17	Q
5	5	Andrzej Stępień	Poland	46.31	
6	7	Eddy De Leeuw	Belgium	46.47	
7	8	Derrick Peynado	Jamaica	46.50	
8	6	Marcel Klarenbeek	Netherlands	46.81	

==== Quarterfinal 3 ====
Rank	Lane	Athlete	Nation	Time	Notes
1	7	Frank Schaffer	East Germany	46.15	Q
2	6	Alberto Juantorena	Cuba	46.23	Q
3	2	Viktor Burakov	Soviet Union	46.23	Q
4	5	Didier Dubois	France	46.60	Q
5	1	Silver Ayoo	Uganda	47.03	
6	4	Bert Cameron	Jamaica	47.31	3
7	3	Glen Cohen	Great Britain	47.35	
8	8	Jacques Borlée	Belgium	47.73	

==== Quarterfinal 4 ====
Rank	Lane	Athlete	Nation	Time	Notes
1	8	David Jenkins	Great Britain	45.99	Q
2	1	Mike Solomon	Trinidad and Tobago	46.12	Q
3	2	Karel Kolář	Czechoslovakia	46.27	Q
4	3	Nikolay Chernetskiy	Soviet Union	46.30	Q
5	5	Roberto Tozzi	Italy	46.73	
6	6	Hope Ezeigbo	Nigeria	46.88	
7	4	Ian Stapleton	Jamaica	47.64	
8	7	Hussain Ali Nasayyif	Iraq	48.50	

=== Semifinals ===
The semifinals were held on Tuesday, July 29, 1980.

Rank	Lane	Athlete	Nation	Time	Notes
1	5	Fons Brijdenbach	Belgium	45.46	Q
2	4	Rick Mitchell	Australia	45.48	Q
3	7	David Jenkins	Great Britain	45.59	Q
4	8	Mike Solomon	Trinidad and Tobago	45.61	Q
5	3	Dele Udo	Nigeria	45.88	
6	2	Nikolay Chernetskiy	Soviet Union	45.94	
7	6	Mauro Zuliani	Italy	46.01	
8	1	Karel Kolář	Czechoslovakia	46.11	

==== Semifinal 2 ====
Rank	Lane	Athlete	Nation	Time	Notes
1	7	Frank Schaffer	East Germany	45.47	Q
2	1	Viktor Markin	Soviet Union	45.60	Q
3	8	Alberto Juantorena	Cuba	45.95	Q
4	3	Joseph Coombs	Trinidad and Tobago	45.96	Q
5	6	Viktor Burakov	Soviet Union	45.97	
6	4	Didier Dubois	France	46.72	
7	5	Jens Smedegaard Hansen	Denmark	47.00	
8	2	Alan Bell	Great Britain	48.50	

=== Final ===
Rank	Lane	Athlete	Nation	Time
1st place, gold medalist(s)	2	Viktor Markin	Soviet Union	44.60
2nd place, silver medalist(s)	4	Rick Mitchell	Australia	44.84
3rd place, bronze medalist(s)	6	Frank Schaffer	East Germany	44.87
4	3	Alberto Juantorena	Cuba	45.09
5	1	Fons Brydenbach	Belgium	45.10
6	7	Mike Solomon	Trinidad and Tobago	45.55
7	8	David Jenkins	Great Britain	45.56
8	5	Joseph Coombs	Trinidad and Tobago	46.33

== See also ==
- 1976 Men's Olympic 400 metres (Montreal)
- 1978 Men's European Championships 400 metres (Prague)
- 1982 Men's European Championships 400 metres (Athens)
- 1983 Men's World Championships 400 metres (Helsinki)
- 1984 Men's Olympic 400 metres (Los Angeles)
