= Martin Weppler =

German sprinter (born 1958)

Personal information
- Born: 21 February 1958 (age 68) Schramberg, West Germany
Medal record
Men's athletics
Representing West Germany
European Championships
| Gold medal – first place | 1978 Prague | 4×400 m |
European Indoor Championships
| Silver medal – second place | 1981 Grenoble | 400 m |

Martin Weppler (born 21 February 1958) is a retired West German sprinter who specialized in the 400 metres.

== Biography ==
He was born in Schramberg. He won a gold medal in the 4 × 400 metres relay at the 1978 European Championships together with Franz-Peter Hofmeister, Bernd Herrmann und Harald Schmid. He won a silver medal in 400 metres behind Andreas Knebel at the 1981 European Indoor Championships. At the 1983 World Championships he entered the 400 m competition without reaching the final and ran in the opening round of the relay race. The same thing happened at the 1984 Summer Olympics.

Domestically he won bronze medals at the West German championships in 1978, 1979, 1981 and 1983. He represented the sports team VfB Stuttgart, and VfL Sindelfingen from 1983.

His personal best was 45.74 seconds, achieved in July 1983 in Munich.
