= Volker Beck =

Volker Beck may refer to:

- Volker Beck (athlete) (born 1956), German athlete
- Volker Beck (politician) (born 1960), German politician
