= Klaus Thiele =

East German sprinter

Medal record

Men's athletics

Representing East Germany

Olympic Games
Silver medal – second place	1980 Moscow	4 × 400 m relay

Klaus Thiele (born 21 January 1958 in Potsdam) was an East German athlete who competed mainly in the 400 metres.

He competed for East Germany in the 1980 Summer Olympics held in Moscow, Soviet Union in the 4 × 400 metres relay where he won the silver medal with his teammates Andreas Knebel, Frank Schaffer and Volker Beck.
