= Frank Schaffer =

East German sprinter

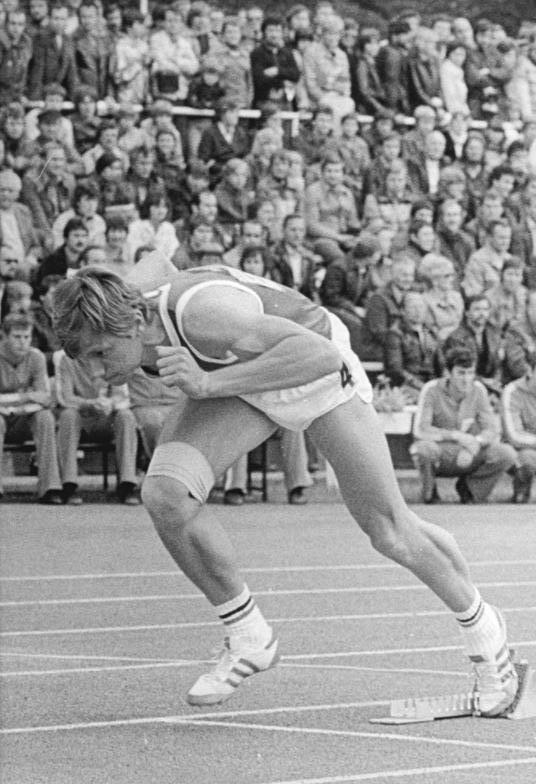

Medal record

Men's athletics

Representing East Germany

Olympic Games
Silver medal – second place	1980 Moscow	4 × 400 m relay
Bronze medal – third place	1980 Moscow	400 m

Frank Schaffer (born 23 October 1958 in Stalinstadt (today Eisenhüttenstadt), Bezirk Frankfurt) is an East German retired athlete who specialised in the 400 metres.

He won the bronze medal in the 400 metres at the 1980 Summer Olympics in a lifetime best time of 44.87 seconds. He also assisted the East German team of Klaus Thiele, Andreas Knebel and Volker Beck in winning the silver medal in the 4 × 400 metres relay.

His personal best time of 44.87 seconds ranks him eighth among German 400 m sprinters, behind Thomas Schönlebe, Erwin Skamrahl, Ingo Schultz, Karl Honz, Hartmut Weber, Mathias Schersing and Jens Carlowitz.

Frank Schaffer retired from athletics in 1984.
