= Newton Perera =

Sri Lankan sprinter (born 1954)

Personal information
- Nationality: Sri Lankan
- Born: 8 July 1954 (age 72)

Sport
- Sport: Sprinting
- Event: 4 × 400 metres relay

K. T. Newton Perera (born 8 July 1954) is a Sri Lankan former sprinter. He competed in the men's 4 × 400 metres relay at the 1980 Summer Olympics.
