= Constantino Reis =

Mozambican sprinter

Personal information
- Nationality: Mozambican
- Born: 1961 (age 64–65)

Sport
- Sport: Sprinting
- Events: 200 metres 400 metres

Constantino Reis (born 1961) is a former Mozambican sprinter. He competed in the men's 200 metres and the men's 400 metres at the 1980 Summer Olympics.
