= Nelson dos Santos =

Brazilian sprinter (born 1952)

Personal information
- Born: 8 May 1952 (age 74) Rio de Janeiro, Brazil

Sport
- Sport: Track and field
Medal record
Representing Brazil
Pan American Games
Bronze medal – third place	1979 San Juan	4x100m relay
Bronze medal – third place	1983 Caracas	4x100m relay

Nelson Rocha dos Santos (born 8 May 1952) is a Brazilian former sprinter who competed in the 1980 Summer Olympics and in the 1984 Summer Olympics.

Nelson dos Santos finished fourth (1979) and sixth (1983) in the 100 metres at the Pan American Games. He was also a member of two bronze medal winning Pan American Games 4×100 metres relay teams in 1979 (with Milton de Castro, Ruy da Silva, and Altevir de Araújo Filho) and in 1983 (with João Batista da Silva, Gérson de Souza, and Róbson da Silva).

Personal Best: 100 – 10.22 (1979).

== International competitions ==
Year	Competition	Venue	Position	Event	Notes
Representing Brazil
1975	South American Championships	Rio de Janeiro, Brazil	2nd	100 m	10.7
1975	South American Championships	Rio de Janeiro, Brazil	1st	4 × 100 m relay	40.8
1975	Pan American Games	Mexico City, Mexico	9th (sf)	100 m	10.39
1975	Pan American Games	Mexico City, Mexico	4th	4 × 100 m relay	39.18
1977	South American Championships	Montevideo, Uruguay	1st	4 × 100 m relay	41.4
1979	Pan American Games	San Juan, Puerto Rico	4th	100 m	10.33
1979	Pan American Games	San Juan, Puerto Rico	3rd	4 × 100 m relay	39.44
1979	Universiade	Mexico City, Mexico	8th (sf)	100 m	10.33^{1}
1979	Universiade	Mexico City, Mexico	8th	4 × 100 m relay	42.82
1979	World Cup	Montreal, Canada	1st	4 × 100 m relay	38.70^{2}
1980	Olympic Games	Moscow, Soviet Union	23rd (qf)	100 m	10.45
1980	Olympic Games	Moscow, Soviet Union	8th	4 × 100 m relay	39.54
1983	Pan American Games	Caracas, Venezuela	6th	100 m	10.35
1983	Pan American Games	Caracas, Venezuela	3rd	4 × 100 m relay	39.08
1983	Ibero-American Championships	Barcelona, Spain	2nd	100 m	10.54
1983	Ibero-American Championships	Barcelona, Spain	3rd	4 × 100 m relay	41.00
1983	Ibero-American Championships	Barcelona, Spain	2nd	4 × 400 m relay	3:07.62
1983	South American Championships	Santa Fe, Argentina	1st	100 m	10.3
1983	South American Championships	Santa Fe, Argentina	2nd	200 m	21.5
1983	South American Championships	Santa Fe, Argentina	1st	4 × 100 m relay	40.7
1984	Olympic Games	Los Angeles, United States	29th (qf)	100 m	10.53
1984	Olympic Games	Los Angeles, United States	8th	4 × 100 m relay	39.40

^{1}Did not start in the final
^{2}Representing the Americas
