= Ronnie Harris (sprinter) =

American sprinter (born 1956)

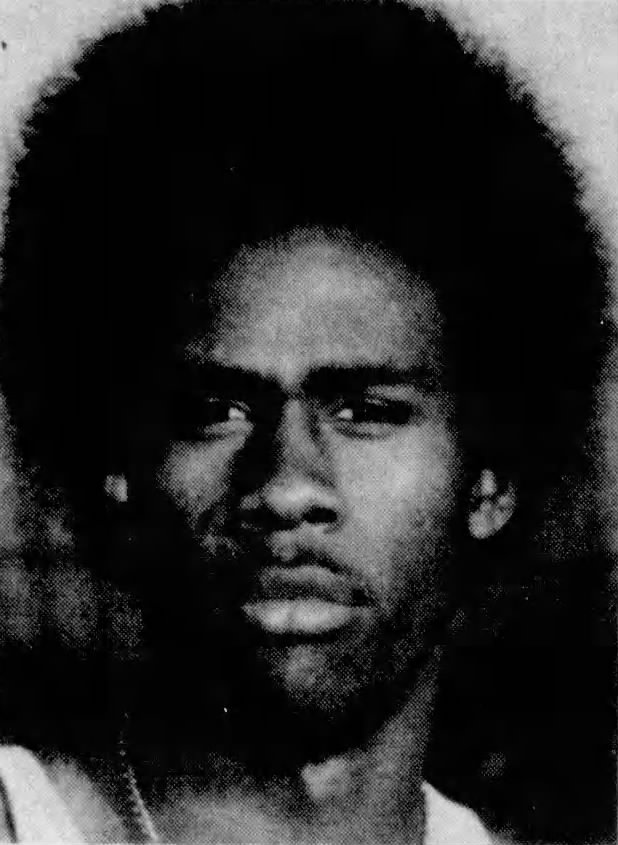

Personal information
- Born: 12 December 1956 (age 69)
- Education: Albemarle High School; University of Tennessee
- Height: 185 cm (6 ft 1 in)
- Weight: 71 kg (157 lb)

Sport
- College team: Tennessee Volunteers
- Club: Athletic Attic
- Coached by: Stan Huntsman; Jimmy Carnes

Achievements and titles
- National finals: 1976 NCAA Indoors; • 440 y, 6th; • 4 × 440 y, 1st (gold); 1976 NCAAs; • 400 m, 6th; 1977 NCAAs; • 4 × 400 m, 3rd (bronze); 1978 NCAA Indoors; • 4 × 440 y, 4th; 1978 NCAAs; • 4 × 400 m, 3rd (bronze); 1979 NCAAs; • 400 m, 3rd (bronze); • 4 × 400 m, 4th
- Personal bests: 200 m: 20.86 (1980); 400 m: 45.79 (1979)
Medal record
Men's athletics
Representing the United States
Spartakiad of the Peoples of the USSR
Gold medal – first place	1979 Moscow	4 × 400 m relay
World University Games
Gold medal – first place	1979 Mexico City	4 × 400 m relay

Ronnie Harris (born 12 December 1956), also known as Ron Harris, is an American former sprinter who won the 4 × 400 m relay gold medal at the 1979 Summer Universiade. Before becoming a professional with the Athletic Attic track club, Harris was a Virginia state champion and world age group record-holder. He was a seven-time All-American for the Tennessee Volunteers men's track and field team.

== Career ==
Running for Albemarle High School in Virginia, Harris was a two-time high school All American sprinter. He won three state titles at the 1975 Virginia High School League track and field championships and set a world age group record in the 440 yards. He was signed to the Tennessee Volunteers men's track and field team to start in 1976.

Harris had a successful freshman season with the Volunteers. He won his first national title at the 1976 4 × 440 yard relay at the NCAA Division I Indoor Track and Field Championships in 3:16.03, splitting 48.5 seconds for 440 yards on the third leg. He also placed 6th in the individual 440 yards. Outdoors, he again placed 6th in the metric 400 metres.

Harris began to struggle his sophomore year in 1977 due to issues with influenza and a viral chest congestion, but nonetheless rebounded to finish 3rd in the 4 × 400 m at the outdoor NCAA Championships. As a junior, Harris finished 4th and 3rd in the indoor 4 × 440 yard and outdoor 4 × 400 m relay NCAA championships respectively, and as a senior he earned his final individual honors by placing 3rd in the 400 m at the 1979 NCAA Division I Outdoor Track and Field Championships and 4th in the relay.

Harris was particularly successful on relays, saying, "Put a baton in my hand and I go crazy". He tied two world records in his career with the Volunteers relay team, consisting of Harris, Reggie Jones, Jerome Morgan, and Lamar Pryor. On 10 April 1976, Harris tied the world best in the 4 × 220 yards relay by running 1:21.7 in Knoxville. He split 20.3 seconds, the second-fastest mark on the team behind Pryor. Then on 24 April 1976, Harris' team tied the top mark in the 4 × 200 m relay, running 1:21.5 hand-timed while Harris split 19.8. Harris said after, "Nobody pushed us through and it was kind of disappointing to just tie the record".

Harris was controversially not selected for the second U.S. Olympic Festival in August 1979. Later that month, Harris was selected for his first international team at the 1979 Spartakiad of the Peoples of the USSR in Moscow. He placed a disappointing 6th in the 400 m but won a gold medal in the 4 × 400 m relay.

By virtue of his finish at the NCAA Championships, Harris was selected to represent the U.S. at the 1979 World University Games in Mexico City on the 4 × 400 m relay. The West German team was "heavily favored", but at the last minute they decided not to race, leaving an opportunity for Harris to win the gold medal. Harris helped his team win in 3:00.98, a Games record.

Harris was considered a serious contender to make the U.S. team at the 1980 Summer Olympics before United States president Carter decided to boycott the Games. Competing at the 1980 United States Olympic trials, Harris failed to qualify for the relay squad.

== Personal life ==
Harris was born 12 December 1956 and attended Albemarle High School in Charlottesville, Virginia. After graduation from college, he competed professionally for the Athletic Attic team coached by Jimmy Carnes.

== Statistics ==
=== Personal best progression ===
400 m progression
#	Mark	Pl.	Competition	Venue	Date	Ref.
1	46.53	3rd place, bronze medalist(s)		Tuscaloosa, AL	13 May 1977	
2	45.79	3rd place, bronze medalist(s)		Champaign, IL	1 Jun 1979	
