= Patricia Jackson =

American sprinter

Personal information
- Born: March 17, 1958 (age 68) Muskogee, Oklahoma, United States

Sport
- Sport: Track and field
Medal record
Representing United States
Pan American Games
Gold medal – first place	1979 San Juan	4x400m relay
Bronze medal – third place	1979 San Juan	400m

Patricia "Pat" Jackson (born March 17, 1958) is a former American sprinter.

In 1979 she won at the Pan American Games in San Juan bronze in the 400 metres and gold in the 4 × 400 metres relay. At the 1979 IAAF World Cup she placed seventh in the 400 metres and third in the 4 × 400 metres relay.

Jackson competed in the AIAW for the Prairie View A&M Lady Panthers track and field team. She ran the 3rd leg on the winning 4 × 110 yards relay at the 1977 AIAW Outdoor Track and Field Championships.
