= Steve Williams (sprinter) =

American sprinter (born 1953)

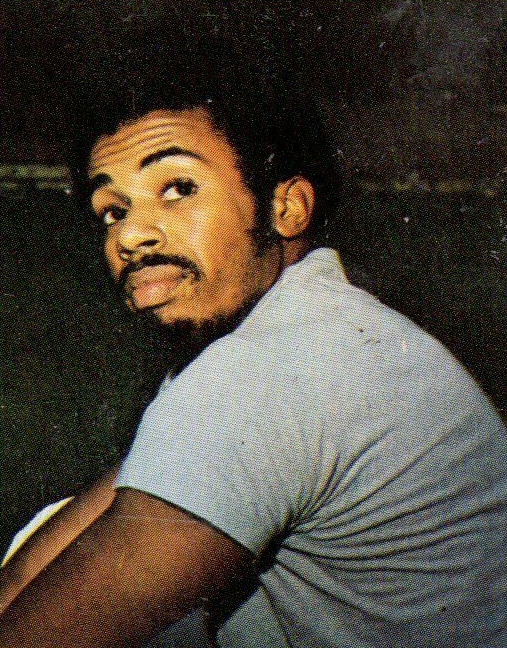
- Steve Williams in 1976.

Personal information
- Nationality: American
- Born: November 13, 1953 (age 72) New York City, United States
- Education: San Diego State University
- Height: 1.92 m (6 ft 4 in)
- Weight: 79 kg (174 lb)

Sport
- Sport: Running
- Events: 100 meters, 200 meters

Achievements and titles
- Personal bests: 100 m: 10.07 s (Zurich, Switzerland; 16/08/1978)/ 9.9 s (hand-time, then WR=) 200 m: 20.16 s (Stuttgart, Germany; 26/08/1975) / 19.8 s (hand-time, then WR=) (Note: Timed during 220 yards race in 1975, E L Quercetani & G Pallicca, A World History of Sprint Racing 1850-2005, p 307.); 400 m: 44.9 s (El Paso, Texas, USA; 13/05/1972) hand-time, 440 yards race (Note: Conversion from 440 yards time by subtracting 0.3 s, http://speedendurance.com/2007/07/20/440-yard-and-400-meter-racing-facts-and-figures/ 440 Yard and 400 Meter Racing – Facts and Figures.) 4x100m m: 38.03 s (Düsseldorf, Germany; 03/09/1977, then WR)
Medal record
Men's athletics
Representing the United States
IAAF World Cup
Gold medal – first place	1977 Düsseldorf	100 m
Gold medal – first place	1977 Düsseldorf	4 × 100 m
Bronze medal – third place	1981 Rome	4 × 100 m

Steve Williams (born November 13, 1953) is a retired track and field sprinter from the United States. He equalled the men's world records for the 100 m and 200 m with hand-timed runs of 9.9 seconds and 19.8 seconds, respectively, and was also a member of a team that set a world record in the 4 × 100 m relay.

He never competed at the Olympics, but had success at the IAAF World Cup: he won the 100 m and set a world record in the 4×100-meter relay with the US team at the inaugural championship in 1977. He won the 100 yd and 220 yd American titles at the 1973 AAU Championships and retained his short sprint title with a 100 m victory in 1974.

== Career ==
He won the 100 meters at the 1977 IAAF Athletics World Cup in Düsseldorf whilst representing the US. He also anchored the 4x100 meters USA relay team to a new world record time of 38.03 seconds, alongside Bill Collins, Steve Riddick and Cliff Wiley – an event statistician Mark Butler for the IAAF puts in his top 10 men's World Cup moments. Williams also received a bronze medal as a member of the 4x100 meters USA relay team at the 1981 IAAF World Cup in Rome.

At the peak of his career he was claimant to the title the world's fastest man. He recorded four 9.9 seconds hand-timings for the 100 meters, so equalling the then world record. He also jointly held the world record for 220 yards (with Don Quarrie) at 19.9 seconds (achieved in 1975). (Note: From 1 January 1977, imperial distances were no longer recognised for world-record purposes by the IAAF.)

Recognized as one of the favorites, his chance of winning the 1976 Olympic 100 meters title was ruined by injury at the quarter-final stage of the USA Olympics trials (the injury suffered was a repeat of the muscle pull he had suffered at the AAU meet earlier in the season). Williams's injury emerged in the qualifying heat in the morning, he grabbed at his thigh 15 meters from the finish line. In the afternoon quarter-final, he could only run 20 meters before pulling-up. The crowd gave him a warm ovation as he sadly left the stadium. The injury also forced him to withdraw from the 200 m trial.

Williams attempted to qualify in the 100 meters again for the Olympics in 1980 (finishing 6th) (Note: A probable place in the sprint relay team was denied by the US boycott of the 1980 Olympics.) and 1984 (eliminated at the quarter-final stage) but failed to make the team by finishing in the top three finishers.

Williams emerged as a formidable talent nationally in 1972 with impressive times in the 100, 220 and 440 yards events (9.3/20.3/45.2 respectively). However, an injury suffered at the quarter-final stage of the 200 m event at the Olympic Trials cost him a chance of going to the 1972 Munich Olympics. He first came to the world's attention in 1973, first by tying the world record for 100 yards (at 9.1 seconds), second by winning both the 100 and 220 yards events at the AAU meet (the first person to do this since Ray Norton in 1960), and thirdly by defeating the great Soviet sprinter Valeriy Borzov on the final leg of the sprint relay at the US versus USSR meet in Minsk. He also set the world's best electronically timed performance in the men's 200 meters that year on June 16 at a meet in Bakersfield, clocking 20.33 s. Williams impressive form continued into 1974 where he equalled the 100 m world record, defended his short sprint title at the AAU Championships, and came second at the NCAA Championships 200 meters event.; and 1975 where he equalled the 200 m world record. While on tour in 1974, he won the French national championship and won the British AAA Championships title at the 1974 AAA Championships.

In 1976, after completing his studies at San Diego State University, majoring in English and journalism, he moved to Florida. Here he worked with his coach, Brooks Johnson, at the Florida Track Club, to help achieve his Olympic dream and a "9.8 and 19.6 kind of human excellence". Williams himself has commented on what Brooks was able to show him about his then running style, "I was shocked....I never realized how bad I was. I had been winning by accident." His style was once described as a "quaint, bobbing-and-weaving, shoulder-rolling style that seems to have been choreographed by Bo Diddley" and that in any race he won he "accomplished the feat with soul, style, lousy starts and great finishes" His equalling again of the then world record for 100 meters early in the 1976 season showed that he was on course to achieve his Olympic dream but sadly it would remain unfulfilled. Both Hasely Crawford, the gold medallist, and Don Quarrie, the silver medallist, in the 1976 Montreal Olympics 100 m event have expressed the belief that with Williams there a faster time, possibly a new world record, would have happened.

His disappointment at being denied Olympic glory was only somewhat assuaged by success at the 1977 IAAF Athletics World Cup - 'This is as close as I can get', he is reported as saying. His narrow victory in the 100 m over Eugen Ray (representing East Germany) was followed by a world record as the anchor for the US team in the sprint relay. Williams has reported that he was troubled with a painful bone spur in one foot leading up to the competition. This meant he had to limit his races, and caused him to lean prematurely with pain at the finish of the 100 m. Williams has also admitted his decision to swap the baton between his hands after the final exchange of the relay may have cost the team the distinction of being the first to run under 38 s, but he also counters that it was a movement that was natural to him, and is a tactic shared by other great sprinters, including Carl Lewis. Usain Bolt is another anchor runner who always swapped hands. Williams also offers the opinion that being a one-off race meant the team did not get to practise under the competitive conditions of running in a heat and semi-final first. This would have allowed the team to further finesse the exchanges that would have allowed the two fastest runners, himself and Steve Riddick, the maximum possible length of the track to run in. (Note: Bill Collins has confirmed in an interview that there was no relay camp in 1977 and that race was the first time they'd run with Steve Williams on the final leg.)

== Rankings ==
Williams was ranked among the best in the US and the world in both the 100 and 200 m sprint events from 1972 to 1980, according to the votes of the experts of Track and Field News.

Williams also showed early promise as 440y/400m runner and in 1972 was ranked seventh by Track and Field News in the United States for the 400 meters.

100 meters
Year	World rank	US rank
1973	1st	1st
1974	2nd	1st
1975	1st	1st
1976	5th	2nd
1977	3rd	2nd
1978	5th	2nd
1979	-	10th
1980	-	8th

200 meters
Year	World rank	US rank
1972	-	6th
1973	1st	1st
1974	6th	2nd
1975	2nd	1st
1976	3rd	2nd
1977	5th	2nd
1978	6th	2nd
1979	-	-
1980	4th	1st

== Seasons bests ==
Notes for tables:

1. world rankings are based on the best time for each athlete.
2. 220 yard times are converted to 200 meters times by subtracting 0.1 s for manual-timed results and 0.12 s for automatic-timed results.
3. for comparison with automatically timed races, manual times have a factor of 0.24 s added.

100 meters
Year	Result	World Rank	Location	Date
1973	10.15	1st	Dakar	Apr 15
1974	9.9	1st	Westwood	Jun 21
1975	10.08	2nd	Zurich	Aug 20
1976	9.9	4th	Gainesville	Mar 27
1977	10.13	5th=	Düsseldorf	Sep 2
1978	10.07	1st=	Zurich	Aug 16

200 meters
Year	Result	World Rank	Location	Date
1972	20.2	3rd	El Paso	Apr 15
1973	20.33	1st	Bakersfield	Jun 16
1974	20.2	4th	Viareggio	Aug 7
1975	19.8	1st	Eugene	Jun 7
1976	19.9	2nd	Gainesville	Apr 17
1977	20.31	5th	Kingston	May 13
1978	20.26	6th	Zurich	Aug 16
1980	20.26	5th	Brussels	Aug 22

== National championships ==
At the peak of his career, Williams was a formidable performer at the US national championships. For instance, his second place in the 100 m in 1977 (Don Quarrie of Jamaica was 1st) qualified him for the Athletics World Cup that year.

USA Championships
Year	100m	200m
1973	1st	1st
1974	1st	4th
1975	2nd	4th
1976	-	-
1977	2nd	-
1978	5th	-

In addition, Williams was United States champion indoors at 60 y in 1976.

== Personal life ==
Williams is a native of The Bronx, New York City, where he attended the Evander Childs High School. Following his birth, Williams had to have his legs put in braces for six months to correct for an acute case of pigeon toes. Always a fast runner as a child, he concentrated on 220 and 440 yards at school, and did not run 100 yards seriously until his senior year. During that time he was also coached by Melvin Clark a policemen at the 32nd princinct, who coached girls and boys in the PAL and AAU programs. The different AAU competitions built his desire and grit. Williams also attributes his competitiveness to his New York upbringing, "you are constantly competing in New York", he has said.

Williams's high-school track coach, Duke Marshall, has written warmly about how, because of unusually long stride length, he had to train in the school hallways and not on the steeply banked school gymnasium track.

After graduation from high school, he went to the University of Texas at El Paso on a full scholarship, but after a year moved to the San Diego State University where he did a degree in television and film production. Here, coached by track coach Dick Hill, he rose to national prominence as a sprinter.

While in college, Williams was sometimes confused with a sprinter by the same name who ran for Idaho State University and set American records in the indoor 300 meters and 100 meters.

In the 1980s, Williams was married to Robin Robinson, who was a long-time news anchor for WFLD in Chicago.

Julie Cart of the LA Times has described how Williams in 1983 had written a screenplay, called Speeding, based upon his experiences of athletics in the 1970s, a screenplay he himself describes as an 'Animal House-type look at the world of big time track and field'. Williams always represented himself with promoters so was more aware than most of the machinations and characters involved with event promotion and payments to athletes. Williams has also discussed how he was an advocate for other athletes and a keen defender of their rights, often working alongside other senior, influential athletes of the time like the high-jumper Dwight Stones. An example of Williams's patience advising younger athletes is given by Carl Lewis who has described how he effectively interrogated Williams for 2 days when they shared a hotel room for a track meet they were both participants in.

Williams has reported that he retired at age 30 because he considered 10 years in the sport at that time was a good career - with the sport being neither as lucrative as it is now, nor having the same level of facilities available for the care of athletes' bodies. Williams believes that in terms of the financial returns for athletes he actively helped move the sport from the amateur to the professional world - from an amateur world that had led earlier sprinting greats like Jesse Owens and Bob Hayes to leave the sport prematurely to the professional world where athletes, like Carl Lewis as one example, could achieve a financially lucrative career and so stay in the sport.

Joseph Durso of the NY Times has written about how Williams, after retiring, worked as a speed coach for the NY Mets baseball team. He is also reported to have worked for the New York Jets football team, the San Francisco 49ers football team, the Montreal Expos baseball team, and the U.S. Tennis Association.

Williams has also worked as a designer of sports shoes, for which he holds patents, and is an office holder in companies involved in this field.

In 2020, Williams is described as living in San Francisco with his Brazilian wife Flavia who he met in 2002.

== Awards ==
In November 2013, Williams was inducted into the United States National Track and Field Hall of Fame.

In August 2016, Williams was inducted into the San Diego State University's Hall of Fame as part of 2016 class.

In May 2025, Steve Williams published a (Always Speeding Memoirs Worlds Fastest).

== Author ==
Steve Williams's first book, Always Speeding Memoirs Worlds Fastest was published on 22 May 2025.

Achievements
Preceded by Valeriy Borzov; Silvio Leonard	Men's 100 m Best Year Performance; 1973, 1974; 1978	Succeeded by Steve Riddick; Pietro Mennea
Preceded by Valeriy Borzov; Donald Quarrie	Men's 200 m Best Year Performance; 1973; 1975	Succeeded by Donald Quarrie; Millard Hampton
