= Rik Vandenberghe =

Belgian sprinter

Personal information
- Nationality: Belgian
- Born: 12 January 1953 (age 73)

Sport
- Sport: Sprinting
- Event: 4 × 400 metres relay

Rik Vandenberghe (born 12 January 1953) is a Belgian sprinter. He competed in the men's 4 × 400 metres relay at the 1980 Summer Olympics.
