= Samararatne Dharmasena =

Sri Lankan sprinter

Personal information
- Nationality: Sri Lankan
- Born: 28 September 1950
- Died: 16 February 2007 (aged 56) Kandy, Sri Lanka
- Height: 173 cm (5 ft 8 in)
- Weight: 60 kg (132 lb)

Sport
- Sport: Sprinting
- Event: 4 × 400 metres relay

Samararatne V. A. Dharmasena (28 September 1950 – 16 February 2007) was a Sri Lankan sprinter. He competed in the men's 4 × 400 metres relay at the 1980 Summer Olympics.
