= Steve Riddick =

American sprinter (born 1951)

Personal information
- Nationality: American
- Born: Steven Earl Riddick; September 18, 1951 (age 74) Newport News, Virginia, United States
- Height: 6 ft 3 in (1.91 m)
- Weight: 165 lb (75 kg)

Sport
- Sport: Running
- Event: 100 meters
- College team: Norfolk State University
- Club: Philadelphia Pioneers

Achievements and titles
- Personal best: 100 m: 10.05 s (Zürich 1975)
Medal record
Men's athletics
Representing the United States
Olympic Games
Gold medal – first place	1976 Montreal	4 × 100 m relay
Pan American Games
Gold medal – first place	1979 San Juan	4 × 100 m relay
Athletics World Cup
Gold medal – first place	1977 Düsseldorf	4 × 100 m relay
Silver medal – second place	1979 Montreal	4 × 100 m relay
Summer Universiade
Gold medal – first place	1973 Moscow	4 x 100 m relay

Steven Earl Riddick (born September 18, 1951) is an American athlete and winner of the gold medal in 4 × 100 meter relay at the 1976 Summer Olympics.

== Personal life ==
Riddick was raised in Hampton, Virginia. His father was a Church of Christ minister there.

Riddick was a late starter in track, concentrating on team sports until his junior year at high school.

After high school, Riddick attended at Norfolk State University, having been recruited by coach Dick Price. There he met his wife Theresita Renee Coleman.

For the last year of his psychology degree course he ran for the Philadelphia Pioneers track club because his college eligibility had ended. It was a move engineered by Coach Price who put Riddick in contact with the Philadelphia Pioneers coach Alex Woodley.

After graduation in 1975, Riddick moved first to Washington D.C. and then Philadelphia and continued to run for the Philadelphia Pioneers club.

== Track career ==
Riddick attempted to qualify for the 1972 Munich Olympics but was eliminated at the semi-final stage in both the 100 and 200 m at the U.S. Olympic Trials.

In 1975, in Zurich, he ran the fastest automatically timed 100 m of the year at 10.05 s, a time that remained his personal best. He had started that year by causing some amazement and amusement when he ran and won an indoor race in his sweat pants. The reason: he had forgotten his shorts. He won the final in borrowed shorts.

At the 1976 Montreal Olympics, Riddick was eliminated in the semi-final of the 100 m race, but ran the anchor leg for the gold medal-winning American 4 × 100 m relay team (with Harvey Glance, Johnny 'Lam' Jones, and Millard Hampton). Riddick had finished third in the 100 m final at the U.S. Olympic Trials. He just missed another medal in the 200 m and finished fourth, narrowly passed in the closing stages of the final by Mark Lutz.

Riddick was a member of American 4 × 100 m relay team, which won the 1977 IAAF World Cup with a new world record of 38.03 s (with Cliff Wiley, Bill Collins and Steve Williams). He was also a member of American 4 × 100 m relay team, which won the 1979 Pan American Games(with Mike Roberson, Harvey Glance and Cliff Wiley) and placed second in 1979 IAAF World Cup (with Mike Roberson, Harvey Glance and Mel Lattany).

In 1978, he won the 100 m and anchored the United States 4 × 100 m relay team to victory in the USA versus USSR meet at the University of California's Edwards Stadium, and so helping the United States to its first overall victory in the dual meet series since 1969.

Riddick attempted to qualify for the 100 m at the 1984 Los Angeles Olympics, but was eliminated at the quarter-final stage at the U.S. Olympic Trials.

Surprisingly, Riddick never achieved much success at the USA National Championships outdoors during his career - his best was fourth in the 100 m (in 1974, 1977, 1978 and 1979) and fifth in the 200 m (in 1977 and 1979) - he was, however, twice United States champion indoors at 60 y in 1977 and 1979. His indoor successes in 1977 led him to being voted Track and Field News's indoor athlete of the year. He also won a British AAA Championships title double in the 100 and 200 metres events at the 1975 AAA Championships.

Riddick ran for his college Norfolk State University until 1974 winning NCAA division titles. He then joined the Philadelphia Pioneers track club. The Philadelphia Pioneer Educational Athletic Development Club, the proper name for the Philadelphia Pioneers, were the brainchild of Alexander J. Woodley. During the period 1977–1981, when Riddick was a member, they were the premier track club in the United States.

In 1980, Riddick was inducted into the Athletic Hall of Fame of The Lower Virginia Peninsula.

In 1997, Riddick was inducted into the Hampton Roads African American Sports Hall of Fame.

== Rankings ==
Riddick was ranked among the best in the US and the world in both the 100 and 200 m sprint events from 1973 to 1979, according to the votes of the experts of Track and Field News.

100 meters
Year	World rank	US rank
1973	-	6th
1974	7th	4th
1975	6th	2nd
1976	6th	3rd
1977	10th	5th
1978	8th	4th
1979	10th	6th

200 meters
Year	World rank	US rank
1973	-	8th
1974	-	-
1975	4th	2nd
1976	8th	5th
1977	6th	3rd
1978	-	10th
1979	-	-

== Coaching career ==
After his athletics career, Riddick was a coach at Norfolk State University.

Riddick enjoyed some early success in the role, but his reputation was tarnished when he was embroiled in a scandal over the misappropriation of university travel funds for which he was sacked.

== Money laundering and bank fraud scandal ==
In 2006, Riddick was indicted and arrested on fraud charges for his alleged involvement in a money laundering scheme. His former student, Tim Montgomery, was also a defendant in the case and Montgomery's former girlfriend, 5-time Olympic medalist sprinter Marion Jones, was also found to have been involved in the operation.

In 2008, Riddick was sentenced to five years and three months in federal prison for counterfeiting checks.
