= Milton de Castro =

Brazilian sprinter (born 1954)

Personal information
- Born: 19 April 1954 (age 72) Rio de Janeiro, Brazil
- Height: 1.76 m (5 ft 9 in)
- Weight: 67 kg (148 lb)

Sport
- Sport: Sprinting
- Event: 100 metres
Medal record
Representing Brazil
Pan American Games
Bronze medal – third place	1979 San Juan	4x100m relay

Milton Costa de Castro (born 19 April 1954) is a Brazilian sprinter. He competed in the men's 100 metres at the 1980 Summer Olympics.

== International competitions ==
Year	Competition	Venue	Position	Event	Notes
Representing Brazil
1979	Pan American Games	San Juan, Puerto Rico	3rd	4 × 100 m relay	39.44
1979	Universiade	Mexico City, Mexico	13th (sf)	100 m	10.43
1979	Universiade	Mexico City, Mexico	8th	4 × 100 m relay	42.82
1979	Universiade	Mexico City, Mexico	6th	4 × 400 m relay	3:05.61
1979	South American Championships	Bucaramanga, Colombia	8th	100 m	10.8
1979	South American Championships	Bucaramanga, Colombia	2nd	4 × 100 m relay	40.2
1980	Olympic Games	Moscow, Soviet Union	39th (h)	100 m	10.74
1980	Olympic Games	Moscow, Soviet Union	8th	4 × 100 m relay	39.54

== Personal bests ==
Outdoor

- 100 metres – 10.43 (Mexico City 1979)
