= Ian Stapleton =

Jamaican sprinter

Personal information
- Born: 6 September 1959 (age 66) Kingston, Colony of Jamaica, British Empire

Sport
- Country: Jamaica
- Sport: Track and field
- Event: Sprints
Medal record
Men's athletics
Representing Jamaica
Pan American Games
Silver medal – second place	1979 Puerto Rico	4 × 100 metres relay
- Updated on 11 December 2016

Ian Stapleton (born 6 September 1959 in Kingston, Jamaica) is a former Jamaican sprinter.

Stapleton competed for the Texas Longhorns track and field team in the NCAA.

At the 1979 Pan American Games he won silver in the 4 × 400 metres relay.

At the 1980 Summer Olympics he was eliminated in the quarterfinal of the 400 metres and in the heat of the 4 × 400 metres relay.
