= Andreas Knebel =

East German sprinter

Personal information
- Born: 21 June 1960 (age 66) Sangerhausen, Bezirk Halle, East Germany
Medal record
Men's athletics
Representing East Germany
Olympic Games
Silver medal – second place	1980 Moscow	4×400 m
European Championships
Silver medal – second place	1982 Athens	400 m
European Indoor Championships
Gold medal – first place	1981 Grenoble	400 m

Andreas Knebel (born 21 June 1960) is a former East German athlete who competed mainly in the 400 metres.

He competed for East Germany in the 1980 Summer Olympics held in Moscow in the 4 × 400 metres relay where he won the silver medal with his teammates Klaus Thiele, Frank Schaffer and Volker Beck.
