= Rafer Mohammed =

Trinidad and Tobago sprinter

Rafer Mohammed (born October 4, 1955 on Trinidad) is a retired athlete from Trinidad and Tobago who specialized in the 400 metres and 4 x 400 metres relay.

== Achievements ==
| Year | Tournament | Venue | Result | Extra |
|---|---|---|---|---|
| 1979 | Pan American Games | San Juan, Puerto Rico | 6th | 4 × 400 m relay |
| 1980 | Olympic Games | Moscow, Soviet Union | 6th | 4 × 400 m relay |
