= Cliff Wiley =

American sprinter (born 1955)

Personal information
- Born: Clifford Wiley; May 21, 1955 (age 71)

Achievements and titles
- Personal bests: 100 m: 10.21 s (Lawrence, USA; 23/04/1977) 200 m: 20.39 s (Zurich, SWI; 15/08/1979); 400 m: 44.70 s (Sacramento, USA; 21/06/1981); 4 × 100 m;38.03 s WR (Düsseldorf, GER; 03/09/1997) 4 × 400 m;2.59.12 (Rome, ITA; 06/09/1981)
Medal record
Representing United States
Pan American Games
Gold medal – first place	1979 San Juan	4x100m relay
Gold medal – first place	1983 Caracas	400m
Summer Universiade
Gold medal – first place	1981 Bucharest	400m
Gold medal – first place	1983 Edmonton	4x400m relay

Clifford 'Cliff' Wiley (born May 21, 1955) is an American former track and field athlete, who competed in the sprints events during his career. He is best known for winning the men's 400 metres event at the 1981 Athletics World Cup in Rome and the 1983 Pan American Games in Caracas.

== Track career ==
Wiley originally competed at the 100 and 200 m events but later moved up to compete more successfully at the 400 m. A two-time USA National Champion at 400 m, in 1981 and 1982, Wiley set his personal best (44.70) in the 400 metres on 21 June 1981 in Sacramento. Wiley competed for his college, the University of Kansas, in the short sprints but did run 400 m relay legs, and it was his success at the latter that led his track coach, Bob Timmons, to believe this would be his best event.

He was also a world record holder in the 4 × 100-meter relay (Bill Collins-Steve Riddick-Cliff Wiley-Steve Williams), as part of the winning USA team at the 1977 Athletics World Cup with a time of 38.03 s – an event statistician Mark Butler for the IAAF puts in his top 10 men's World Cup moments.

In 1979, Wiley was a member of the winning 4 × 100 m United States relay team at the 1979 Pan American Games

In 1981, Wiley at 400 m because USA Champion, winner of the Summer Universiade and the IAAF World Cup. He was also number one ranked in the world at the event.

In 1983, Wiley became United States champion indoors at 440 y. and won the Pan American Games title at 400 m.

Wiley never ran in the Olympics. Having qualified as second in the 200 m at the US Olympic Trials in 1980, he was denied participation at the 1980 Moscow Olympics because of the USA boycott. In 1984, a contender in the 400 m, his chances at the Olympic Trials were ruined by injury, he could only reach the quarter-final stage. He had also run in the 1976 Olympic Trials in the 100 and 200 m reaching the quarter-final stage at both events.

== Personal life ==
Wiley attended Douglass High School in Baltimore.

After graduation, he went to the University of Kansas, attending the law school there. A successful athlete during his time there - he won All-America honors 13 times and was part of the team that won the NCAA indoor title in the 1,600 relay in 1977. This success was later recognised by him being inducted into the Kansas Athletics Hall of Fame. Wiley was always more than just an athlete, during his time at university, for instance, he served as leader of the Black American Law Students Association. During his time at the University of Kansas, Wiley was involved in a case against the NCAA over his personal funding. He was awarded an injunction that allowed him to continue to compete. The case was eventually dismissed (after Wiley had graduated) but it did lead to a voluntary rule change by the NCAA.

After leaving college, Wiley settled in Kansas City, Kansas, and became a lawyer.

Wiley organised an annual running event, the Cliff Wiley Track Classic, in Baltimore to give something back to his home area. This has been superseded by the International Youth track and Field Championships that Wiley also helps organise.

An experienced track coach and meet organiser in his local area, in 2004 he was appointed head manager of Team USA at the IAAF World Junior Championships in Italy.

Wiley is very interested in the organization of track and field and has spoken up for a clean, ethical sport. As he has stated 'When you're on drugs or counting on drugs, what kind of example are you setting?' Another example is when he spoke out against the athletes who withdrew from the 1983 Pan-American Games when the nature of the new drug-testing regime became clear.

In 2021, Wiley was involved in the launch of the Topeka Super Indoor Invitational at Washburn University.

Wiley has spoken that as a child his dreams were to "Run in the Olympics, and be the mayor of Baltimore City." He may yet achieve his second dream but the first was denied by the USA boycott in 1980 and has left a painful memory. As a member of the 1980 team he was invited to the White House to meet President Jimmy Carter. Wiley has said of meeting the President, "I respected the situation, but I guess I wanted to tell him that he was fighting with the wrong instrument. I heard all of this talk about sacrifice. I thought making a sacrifice was a voluntary thing."

== Achievements ==
Year	Competition	Venue	Position	Notes
Representing the United States
1977	IAAF World Cup	Düsseldorf, Germany	1st	4 × 100 metres
1979	Pan American Games	San Juan, Puerto Rico	1st	4 × 100 metres
1981	Universiade	Bucharest, Romania	1st	400 meters
	IAAF World Cup	Rome, Italy	1st	400 meters
	IAAF World Cup	Rome, Italy	1st	4 × 400 meters
1983	Pan American Games	Caracas, Venezuela	1st	400 metres

== Rankings ==
Wiley was ranked among the best in the US and the world in both the 200 and 400 m sprint events from 1977 to 1983, according to the votes of the experts of Track and Field News.

200 meters
Year	World rank	US rank
1977	-	8th
1978	-	9th
1980	-	10th
1981	-	7th

400 meters
Year	World rank	US rank
1981	1st	1st
1982	4th	1st
1983	-	5th

== USA Championships ==
Wiley was a very successful competitor at both 200 and 400 m in the USA National Track and Field Championships between 1977 and 1983.:

USA Championships
Year	200 m	400 m
1977	4th	-
1978	-	-
1979	3rd	-
1980	-	-
1981	-	1st
1982	-	1st
1980	-	6th

== See also ==
- http://www.trackandfieldnews.com/images/stories/tfn_pdfs/Interviews/cliff%20wiley.pdf T&F N Interview: Cliff Wiley, Jon Henderschott, October 1981.
