= Hope Ezeigbo =

Nigerian sprinter

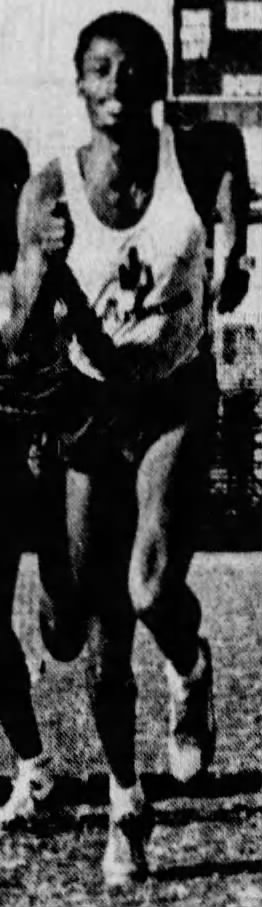
- Hope Ezeigbo running alongside his Arizona Wildcats track and field teammates

Personal information
- Nationality: Nigerian
- Born: 26 May 1958 (age 68)

Sport
- Sport: Sprinting
- Event: 400 metres
Medal record
Men's athletics
Representing Nigeria
African Championships
Silver medal – second place	1979 Dakar	4×400 m

Hope Ezeigbo (born 26 May 1958) is a Nigerian sprinter. He competed in the men's 400 metres at the 1980 Summer Olympics.

Ezeigbo was a prominent athlete as a member of the Phoenix College Bears before being signed to the Arizona Wildcats track and field team in 1980. At Arizona, he broke the 4 x 400 metres relay school record with a 3:07.20 mark at the 1981 NCAA Division I Outdoor Track and Field Championships.
