= Mikhail Linge =

Soviet athlete (1958–1994)

Olympic medal record

Men's Athletics
| Gold medal – first place | 1980 Moscow | 4 × 400 m relay |

Mikhail Innokentyevich Linge (Russian: Михаил Иннокентьевич Линге; November 26, 1958, in Kaluga – February 4, 1994) was a gold medalist in the men's 4 × 400 m relay at the 1980 Summer Olympics for the Soviet Union.

After the Olympics, Linge lived in Moscow, studied at the State Central Institute of Physical Culture and played for the team in Moscow. Domestic problems and an obscure sporting future caused Linge to enter criminal activities. Linge was sentenced to nine and a half years in prison. After he was granted amnesty in 1990, Linge started a business project (what it was is unknown). His partner in the project (in which Mikhail had invested almost all his money) deceived him. As a result, Linge ended up bankrupt and in debt. Linge was found dead on 4 February 1994, in Moscow, killed under mysterious circumstances.
