= Derrick Peynado =

Jamaican sprinter

Personal information
- Nationality: Jamaican
- Born: 30 January 1960 (age 66)

Sport
- Sport: Sprinting
- Event: 400 metres

Derrick Peynado (born 30 January 1960) is a Jamaican sprinter. He competed in the men's 400 metres at the 1980 Summer Olympics.

From Kingston, Jamaica, Peynado moved to the United States in 1975 and attended Thomas Jefferson High School and Seton Hall University.
