= Athletics at the 1979 Pan American Games =

Athletics at the VIII Pan American Games
- Dates: 7–14 July
- Host city: San Juan, Puerto Rico
- Venue: Estadio Sixto Escobar
- Events: 39
- Participation: 380 athletes from 30 nations

Athletics competitions at the 1979 Pan American Games in San Juan were held from July 7 to 14 at the Estadio Sixto Escobar.

== Medalists ==
Key
GR	Pan American Games record

=== Men's events ===
Event	Gold		Silver		Bronze	
100 metres (wind: +1.5 m/s)	Silvio Leonard; Cuba	10.13	Harvey Glance; United States	10.19	Emmit King; United States	10.30
200 metres (wind: +3.9 m/s)	Silvio Leonard; Cuba	20.37	James Gilkes; Guyana	20.46	Don Coleman; United States	20.56
400 metres	Tony Darden; United States	45.11	Alberto Juantorena; Cuba	45.24	Willie Smith; United States	45.3
800 metres	James Robinson; United States	1:46.3 GR	Alberto Juantorena; Cuba	1:46.4	Agberto Guimarães; Brazil	1:46.8
1500 metres	Don Paige; United States	3:40.4 GR	Todd Harbour; United States	3:41.5	Agberto Guimarães; Brazil	3:41.5
5000 metres	Matt Centrowitz; United States	14:01.0	Herb Lindsay; United States	14:04.1	Rodolfo Gómez; Mexico	14:05.0
10,000 metres	Rodolfo Gómez; Mexico	29:02.4	Enrique Aquino; Mexico	29:03.9	Frank Shorter; United States	29:06.4
110 metres hurdles (wind: +2.0 m/s)	Renaldo Nehemiah; United States	13.20 GR	Alejandro Casañas; Cuba	13.46	Charles Foster; United States	13.56
400 metres hurdles	James Walker; United States	49.66	Antônio Dias Ferreira; Brazil	50.85	Frank Montiéh; Cuba	51.30
3000 metres steeplechase	Henry Marsh; United States	8:43.6	William McCullough; United States	8:44.7	Demetrio Cabanillos; Mexico	8:52.4
4 × 100 metres relay	United States; Mike Roberson; Harvey Glance; Cliff Wiley; Steve Riddick	38.85	Cuba; Osvaldo Lara; Alejandro Casañas; Silvio Leonard; Juan Saborit	39.14	Brazil; Milton de Castro; Nelson dos Santos; Rui da Silva; Altevir de Araújo	39.44
4 × 400 metres relay	United States; James Walker; Herman Frazier; Maurice Peoples; Tony Darden	3:03.8	Jamaica; Ian Stapleton; Floyd Brown; Bert Cameron; Colin Bradford	3:04.7	Cuba; Frank Montiéh; Carlos Álvarez; Alberto Juantorena; Pedro Tanis	3:06.3
Marathon	Radamés González; Cuba	2:24:09	Luis Barbosa; Colombia	2:24:44	Rich Hughson; Canada	2:25:34
20 kilometres walk	Daniel Bautista; Mexico	1:28:15 GR	Neal Pyke; United States	1:30:17	Todd Scully; United States	1:32:30
50 kilometres walk	Raúl González; Mexico	4:05:17 GR	Martín Bermúdez; Mexico	4:11:13	Marco Evoniuk; United States	4:24:20
High jump	Franklin Jacobs; United States	2.26 GR	Benn Fields; United States	2.19	Milton Ottey; Canada	2.19
Pole vault	Bruce Simpson; Canada	5.15	Greg Woepse; United States	5.05	Brian Morrissette; Virgin Islands	4.85
Long jump	João Carlos de Oliveira; Brazil	8.18	David Giralt; Cuba	8.15	Carl Lewis; United States	8.13
Triple jump	João Carlos de Oliveira; Brazil	17.27	Willie Banks; United States	16.88	James Butts; United States	16.69
Shot put	Dave Laut; United States	20.22 GR	Bishop Dolegiewicz; Canada	19.67	Bruno Pauletto; Canada	19.61
Discus throw	Mac Wilkins; United States	63.30	Bradley Cooper; Bahamas	62.16 GR	Luis Delís; Cuba	61.70
Hammer throw	Scott Neilson; Canada	69.64 GR	Armando Orozco; Cuba	68.48	Genovevo Morejón; Cuba	67.66
Javelin throw	Duncan Atwood; United States	84.16 GR	Antonio González; Cuba	84.12	Raúl Pupo; Cuba	81.96
Decathlon	Bobby Coffman; United States	8078 GR	Tito Steiner; Argentina	7638	Zenon Smiechowski; Canada	7337

=== Women's events ===
Event	Gold		Silver		Bronze	
100 metres (wind: +0.9 m/s)	Evelyn Ashford; United States	11.07	Brenda Morehead; United States	11.11	Angella Taylor; Canada	11.36
200 metres (wind: +2.2 m/s)	Evelyn Ashford; United States	22.24	Angella Taylor; Canada	22.74	Merlene Ottey; Jamaica	22.79
400 metres	Sharon Dabney; United States	51.81	June Griffith; Guyana	51.81	Patricia Jackson; United States	52.32
800 metres	Essie Kelley; United States	2:01.2 GR	Julie Brown; United States	2:01.2	Aurelia Pentón; Cuba	2:02.1
1500 metres	Mary Decker; United States	4:05.7 GR	Julie Brown; United States	4:06.4	Penny Werthner; Canada	4:14.8
3000 metres	Jan Merrill; United States	8:53.6 GR	Julie Brown; United States	8:59.9	Geri Fitch; Canada	9:35.7
100 metres hurdles (wind: +3.9 m/s)	Deby LaPlante; United States	12.90	Sharon Lane; Canada	13.56	Grisel Machado; Cuba	13.60
4 × 100 metres relay	United States; Valerie Brisco; Karen Hawkins; Chandra Cheeseborough; Brenda Morehead	43.30	Jamaica; Lelieth Hodges; Rosie Allwood; Carmetta Drummond; Merlene Ottey	44.18	Cuba; Marta Zulueta; Silvia Chivás; Isabel Taylor; Eloína Echevarría	46.26
4 × 400 metres relay	United States; Sharon Dabney; Patricia Jackson; Rosalyn Bryant; Essie Kelley	3:29.4 GR	Cuba; Ana Fidelia Quirot; Nery McKeen; Ana Luisa Guibert; Aurelia Pentón	3:36.3a	Canada; Micheline Racette; Marita Payne; Jeanette Wood; Anne Mackie-Morelli	3:37.6a
High jump	Louise Ritter; United States	1.93 GR	Pam Spencer; United States	1.87	Debbie Brill; Canada	1.85
Long jump	Kathy McMillan; United States	6.46	Ana Alexander; Cuba	6.31	Eloína Echevarría; Cuba	6.27
Shot put	María Elena Sarría; Cuba	18.81 GR	Maren Seidler; United States	18.57	Carmen Ionesco; Canada	16.50
Discus throw	Carmen Romero; Cuba	60.58 GR	María Cristina Betancourt; Cuba	60.44	Carmen Ionesco; Canada	57.14
Javelin throw	María Caridad Colón; Cuba	62.30 GR	Lynn Cannon; United States	56.18	Cathy Sulinski; United States	55.82
Pentathlon	Diane Konihowski; Canada	4605	Jodi Anderson; United States	4434	Jill Ross; Canada	4112

== Medal table ==
Rank	Nation	Gold	Silver	Bronze	Total
1	United States	25	16	11	52
2	Cuba	6	10	9	25
3	Canada	3	3	12	18
4	Mexico	3	2	2	7
5	Brazil	2	1	3	6
6	Jamaica	0	2	1	3
7	Guyana	0	2	0	2
8	Argentina	0	1	0	1
8	Bahamas	0	1	0	1
8	Colombia	0	1	0	1
11	Virgin Islands	0	0	1	1
Totals (11 entries)		39	39	39	117

== Participating nations ==
- Antigua and Barbuda (7)
- Argentina (14)
- Bahamas (3)
- Barbados (5)
- Bermuda (6)
- Bolivia (1)
- Brazil (26)
- Canada (50)
- Chile (13)
- Colombia (6)
- Costa Rica (5)
- Cuba (50)
- Dominican Republic (11)
- Ecuador (2)
- Guatemala (1)
- Guyana (3)
- Honduras (8)
- Jamaica (17)
- Mexico (15)
- Panama (2)
- Paraguay (1)
- Peru (1)
- Puerto Rico (41)
- El Salvador (3)
- Suriname (1)
- Trinidad and Tobago (9)
- United States (68)
- Virgin Islands (8)
- Uruguay (2)
- Venezuela (1)
