= Jens Smedegaard Hansen =

Danish sprinter (born 1957)

Personal information
- Nationality: Danish
- Born: 16 June 1957 (age 69) Aalborg, Denmark

Sport
- Sport: Sprinting
- Event: 400 metres

Jens Smedegaard Hansen (born 16 June 1957) is a Danish sprinter. He competed in the men's 400 metres at the 1980 Summer Olympics.
