= Amadou Meïté =

Ivorian sprinter

Personal information
- Born: November 28, 1949
- Died: February 11, 2014 (aged 64)
Medal record
Men's athletics
Representing Ivory Coast
All-Africa Games
Gold medal – first place	1978 Algiers	100 m
African Championships
Gold medal – first place	1979 Dakar	4×100 m
Summer Universiade
Silver medal – second place	1979 Mexico City	4x100m

Amadou Meïté (November 28, 1949 – February 11, 2014) was a sprinter from Côte d'Ivoire, who represented his country twice at the Summer Olympics, in 1972 and 1976. He is best known for winning the gold medal in the men's 100 metres at the 1978 All-Africa Games.

== History ==
Meïté was the father of Ben Youssef Meïté, a double African champion in 2010 and 2012 in 100 and 200 meters, respectively.

In January 2014, Amadou Meïté was hospitalized in Abidjan for an undisclosed illness, after being transferred there from the University Hospital in Yopougon. He died in February 2014 at the age of 64.

== Personal bests ==
- 100 metres – 10.32 (1980)
