= Leslie Kerr =

American sprinter

Personal information
- Born: September 17, 1958 (age 67) Snook, Texas, United States

Sport
- Sport: Track and field
Medal record
Representing United States
Summer Universiade
Gold medal – first place	1979 Mexico City	4x400m relay

Leslie Kerr (born September 17, 1958) is a retired American sprinter.

Formerly one of the top quartermilers in the United States, he was a six-time All-America and won six Southwest Conference titles.

== Life and career ==
Kerr grew up outside Snook, Texas. He attended Texas A&M University, where he majored in poultry science.

Kerr was a track letterman in 1978, 1979, 1980 and 1981. He was coached by Charlie Thomas at Texas A&M.

In May 1981, Kerr ran 400 meters in 44.90 seconds. In 1989, he was inducted into the Texas A&M Athletic Hall of Fame.
