= Joshua Kio =

Nigerian long jumper

Personal information
- Full name: Jubobaraye Joshua Kio
- Nationality: Nigerian
- Born: 7 September 1957 (age 68)

Sport
- Sport: Athletics
- Event: Long jump

Jubobaraye Joshua Kio (born 7 September 1957) is a Nigerian athlete. He competed in the men's long jump at the 1980 Summer Olympics and the 1984 Summer Olympics.
