= Walter McCoy (sprinter) =

American sprinter

Personal information
- Nationality: United States
- Born: November 15, 1958 (age 67) Daytona Beach, Florida, U.S.

Sport
- Sport: Running
- Event: Sprints
- College team: Florida State Seminoles
Medal record
Representing United States
Summer Universiade
Gold medal – first place	1979 Mexico City	4x400m relay
Silver medal – second place	1981 Bucharest	400m
Silver medal – second place	1981 Bucharest	4x400m relay
Bronze medal – third place	1979 Mexico City	400m

Walter Lee McCoy (born November 15, 1958) is an American former sprinter who qualified for the 1980 U.S. Olympic team but was unable to compete due to the 1980 Summer Olympics boycott. He did however receive one of 461 Congressional Gold Medals created especially for the spurned athletes. He did compete in the 1984 Summer Olympics.

A native of Daytona Beach, Florida, McCoy attended Seabreeze High School. The Orlando Sentinel named McCoy among their list of the best high school track and field athletes in Central Florida history.

McCoy twice finished on the podium at the British AAA Championships finishing second behind fellow American Tony Darden at the 1981 AAA Championships and third at the 1983 AAA Championships.
