= Avognan Nogboun =

Ivorian athlete

Personal information
- Nationality: Ivorian
- Born: 1954 (age 71–72)

Sport
- Sport: Sprinting
- Event: 400 metres
Medal record
Men's athletics
Representing Ivory Coast
African Championships
Gold medal – first place	1979 Dakar	4×100 m
Summer Universiade
Silver medal – second place	1979 Mexico City	4x100m

Avognan Nogboun (born 1954) is an Ivorian sprinter. He competed in the men's 400 metres at the 1976 Summer Olympics.
