= Jacques Fellice =

French sprinter

Jacques Fellice (born 8 February 1955 in Pointe-a-Pitre, Guadeloupe) is a French athlete who specialises in the 4 x 400 meter relay. Fellice competed at the 1980 Summer Olympics and 1984 Summer Olympics.
