= Rolf Gisler =

Swiss sprinter

Personal information
- Nationality: Swiss
- Born: 3 October 1953 (age 72)

Sport
- Sport: Sprinting
- Event: 4 × 400 metres relay

Rolf Gisler (born 3 October 1953) is a Swiss sprinter. He competed in the men's 4 × 400 metres relay at the 1980 Summer Olympics.
