= Alan Bell (sprinter) =

British sprinter (born 1957)

Personal information
- Full name: Alan Richard Bell
- Nationality: British
- Born: 10 June 1957 (age 68) Wakefield, England

Sport
- Sport: Sprinting
- Event: 400 metres

Alan Richard Bell (born 10 June 1957) is a British sprinter. He competed in the men's 400 metres at the 1980 Summer Olympics.

Bell was a member of the Wakefield Harriers. He started his career in the 100 metres and 200 metres, winning medals at the Yorkshire Athletics Championships and Northern Championships, before moving up to 400 metres. In July 1977, Bell represented Britain in a meeting against France in Nice.

Bell opened his 1978 season with wins over both 100 and 300 metres, highlighting the spring Liverpool Harriers meeting in Kirkby. He first represented the United Kingdom in June 1978, in a dual meet with East Germany in Crystal Palace, London.

By winning the silver medal at the 1980 UK Athletics Championships, he qualified for the Olympics, at which he reached the semi-finals but did not advance to the finals due to a stomach bug.

In 1980, Bell worked at St Thomas' Hospital in Middlesex on weekends.

Bell competed at the 1981 Anniversary Games in a specially-arranged race over 300 metres against Olympic decathlon champion Daley Thompson, hurdler Bill Hartley, and other runners.

At the 1982 West Yorkshire Championships, Bell led the "highlight of the meeting" by running 47.8 seconds to win the 400 metres.

Bell's brother is Roger Bell, silver medalist in the 400 m hurdles at the 1979 UK Athletics Championships. After retiring from athletics, he worked in medicine.
