= Harry Schulting =

Dutch athletics competitor

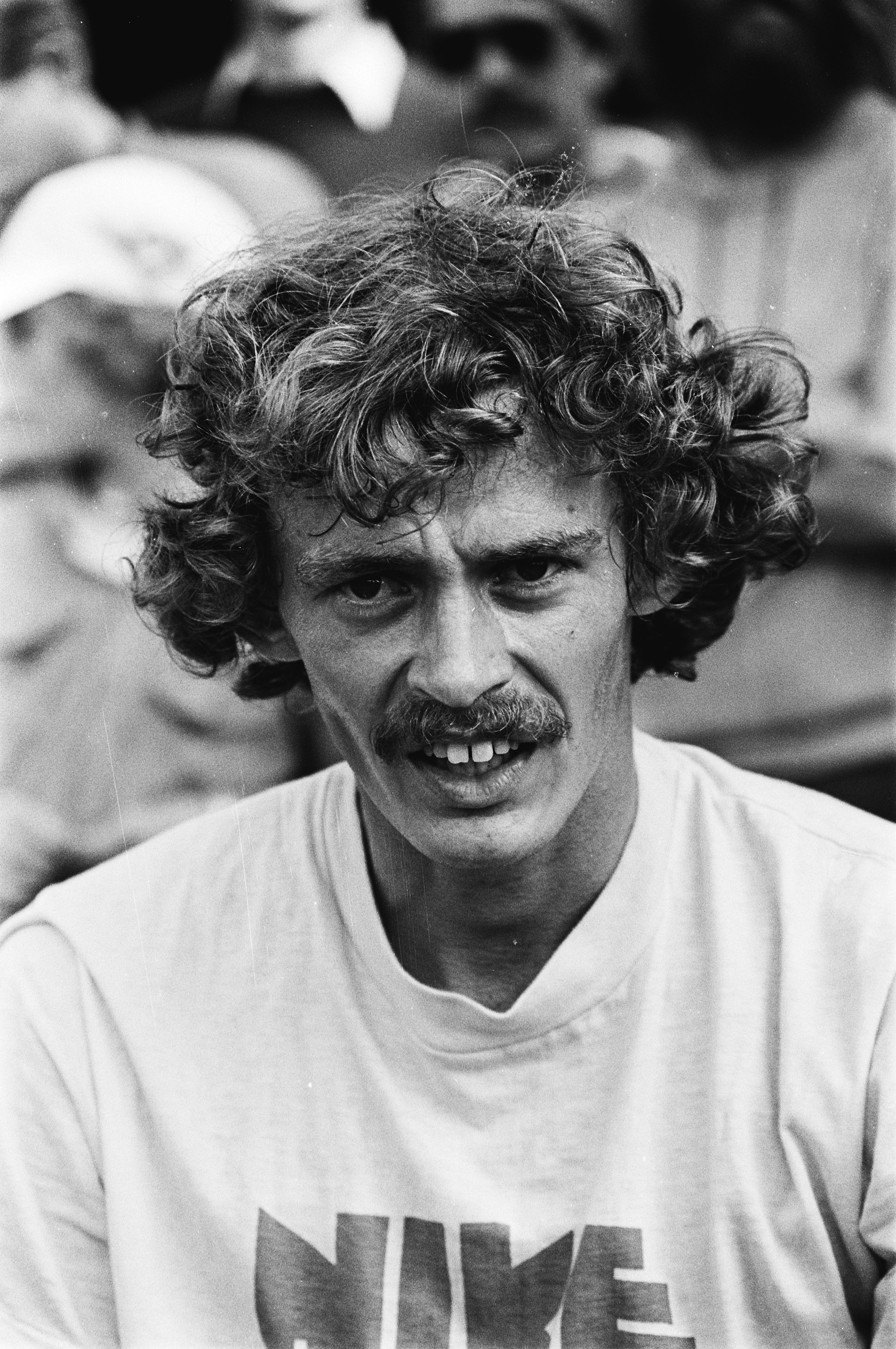
- Schulting in 1979

Personal information
- Born: 14 February 1956 (age 70) Haarlem, the Netherlands
- Height: 1.92 m (6 ft 4 in)
- Weight: 79 kg (174 lb)

Sport
- Sport: Middle-distance running, hurdling
- Club: Prins Hendrik, Vught
Medal record
Representing Netherlands
Summer Universiade
Gold medal – first place	1979 Mexico City	400m hurdles
Silver medal – second place	1979 Mexico City	4x400m relay

Hermanus Richardus Johannes "Harry" Schulting (born 14 February 1956) is a Dutch former middle-distance runner and hurdler.

Schulting won a gold medal on the 400 m hurdles at the 1979 Summer Universiade in Mexico City in 48.44 seconds, a time that is still (as of 2022) the Dutch national record. At these games he also won a silver medal with the 4 × 400 m relay team. Schulting competed in the 1980 Summer Olympics on the 400 m, 4 × 400 m and the 400 m hurdling, but only reached the semifinals in the latter event.

Awards
Preceded by Gerard Tebroke	Herman van Leeuwen Cup; 1979	Succeeded by Gerard Nijboer
