= Isidoro Hornillos =

Spanish sprinter

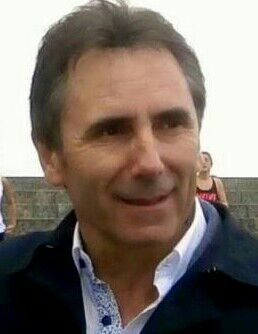
- Isidoro Hornillos in 2014

Personal information
- Nationality: Spanish
- Born: 27 April 1957 (age 69) Castronuño, Spain

Sport
- Sport: Sprinting
- Event: 400 metres

Isidoro Hornillos Baz (born 27 April 1957) is a Spanish sprinter. He competed in the men's 400 metres at the 1980 Summer Olympics.
