= Volker Beck (athlete) =

East German sprinter and hurdler

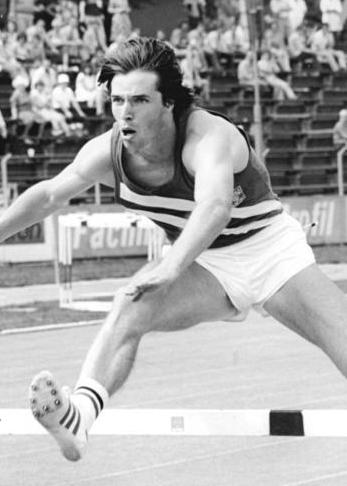
- Beck at a 400m hurdles race in 1981

Medal record

Men's athletics

Representing East Germany

Olympic Games
Gold medal – first place	1980 Moscow	400 m hurdles
Silver medal – second place	1980 Moscow	4 × 400 m relay

IAAF World Cup
Silver medal – second place	1977 Düsseldorf	400 m
Silver medal – second place	1977 Düsseldorf	400 m hurdles
Silver medal – second place	1981 Rome	400 m hurdles

Volker Beck (born 30 June 1956 in Nordhausen, Bezirk Erfurt) is a former East German athlete, winner of 400 m hurdles at the 1980 Summer Olympics.

With the best 400 m hurdler in the late 1970s and early 1980s Edwin Moses missing due to the boycott, the most likely winner of the Olympic gold was Volker Beck, the East German 400 m hurdles champion in 1980, 1981 and 1983.

In Moscow, Beck won the 400 m hurdles in 48,70 s, beating second-placed Vasyl Arkhypenko from Soviet Union by 0.16 seconds, although it was the slowest Olympic final since 1964. Beck won his second Olympic medal in 4 × 400 m relay, when he was beaten to a second place by Soviet anchor Viktor Markin.

After his athletics career, Beck started to work as a coach, among other things he was a coach of German National Team.
