= Georges Kablan Degnan =

Ivorian sprinter

Personal information
- Nationality: Ivorian
- Born: 23 April 1953 (age 73) Nouamou, Ivory Coast

Sport
- Sport: Sprinting
- Event: 200 metres
Medal record
Men's athletics
Representing Ivory Coast
African Championships
| Gold medal – first place | 1979 Dakar | 4×100 m |
| Gold medal – first place | 1982 Cairo | 4×100 m |
| Silver medal – second place | 1979 Dakar | 200 m |
| Silver medal – second place | 1982 Cairo | 200 m |
| Silver medal – second place | 1984 Rabat | 4×100 m |
Summer Universiade
| Silver medal – second place | 1979 Mexico City | 4x100m |
| Bronze medal – third place | 1981 Bucharest | 200m |

Georges Kablan Degnan (born 23 April 1953) is an Ivorian former sprinter. He competed in the 200 metres at the 1976 Summer Olympics and the 1984 Summer Olympics.

Kablan competed for the Washington State Cougars track and field team in the NCAA.
