= Koen Gijsbers =

Dutch sprinter

Personal information
- Nationality: Dutch
- Born: 22 August 1958 (age 67)

Sport
- Sport: Track and field
- Events: 400 metres 800 metres 4 × 400 metres relay
Medal record
Track and field
Representing Netherlands
Summer Universiade
Silver medal – second place	1979 Mexico City	4 x 400m relay
IAAF World Cup
Silver medal – second place	1981 Rome	4 x 400m relay

Koen Gijsbers (born 22 April 1958) is a former Dutch sprinter and middle-distance runner. He competed in the men's 400 metres at the 1980 Summer Olympics.

== Statistics ==
=== Personal bests ===
==== Indoor ====
Event	Time	Venue	Date	Records
400 metres	48.21	Grenoble, France	21 February 1981	NR
800 metres	1:50.2	Sindelfingen, Germany	1 March 1980	IL

==== Outdoor ====
Event	Time	Venue	Date	Records
400 metres	45.80	Villeneuve d'Ascq, France	4 July 1981	
800 metres	1:46.8	Arnhem, Netherlands	22 September 1979	IL
4 × 400 metres relay	3:01.47	Rome, Italy	6 September 1981	

=== Season's best ===
==== Indoor ====
Year	400 metres	800 metres
1977	—	—
1978	—	—
1979	—	1:51.9 IL
1980	—	1:50.2 IL
1981	48.21	—

==== Outdoor ====
Year	400 metres	800 metres	4 × 400 metres relay
1977	—	1:50.8 IL	3.12.4 IL
1978	46.20	1:47.7 IL	3:07.6 IL
1979	46.17	1:46.8 IL	―
1980	46.12	—	—
1981	45.80	—	3:01.47
