= Mike Roberson =

American sprinter

Personal information
- Born: March 25, 1956 (age 70) Winter Park, Florida, United States

Sport
- Sport: Track and field
Medal record
Representing United States
Pan American Games
Gold medal – first place	1979 San Juan	4x100m relay
Summer Universiade
Gold medal – first place	1979 Mexico City	100m

Mike Roberson (born March 25, 1956) was an American former sprinter. He was a very talented track athlete for his high school, Winter Park, and college. His university was the Florida State.

At Winter Park, Roberson competed in the 120-yard high hurdles, and the 100- and 220-yard sprint races. At the state meet in 1975, Roberson set a national high school record of 13.2 s in the 120 hurdles plus recording the outstanding times of 9.4 s for the 100 y and 21.1 s for the 220 y. Also in 1975, Robertson clocked a high-school record for the 100 y at 9.2 s and equalled the then records for the 120 y hurdles (his new record was pending) and 220 y.

Roberson was a key member of the Florida State track team during his years there, 1976–1980, setting college indoor and outdoor records in the 60, 100, and 200 m, and Metro Conference records in the 100 and 200 m. His greatest triumph was winning the 1980 NCAA (United States college) title at 200 m.

Roberson also triumphed on the international stage by winning gold in the 100 m at the 1979 World University Games and as part of the winning United States 4 × 100 m relay team at the 1979 Pan American Games.

His triumphs as a high-school and college athlete in Florida were honoured by having a track meet named after him - the Mike Roberson Invitational. The meet was started by the former coach of his old high school, Winter Park, Bob Mosher.

In 1985, he was inducted into the Florida State University Hall of Fame.

In 1989, he was inducted into the Central Florida Sports Hall of Fame.

In 2010, he was inducted into the Winter Park Sports Hall of Fame.
