= Marcel Klarenbeek =

Dutch sprinter

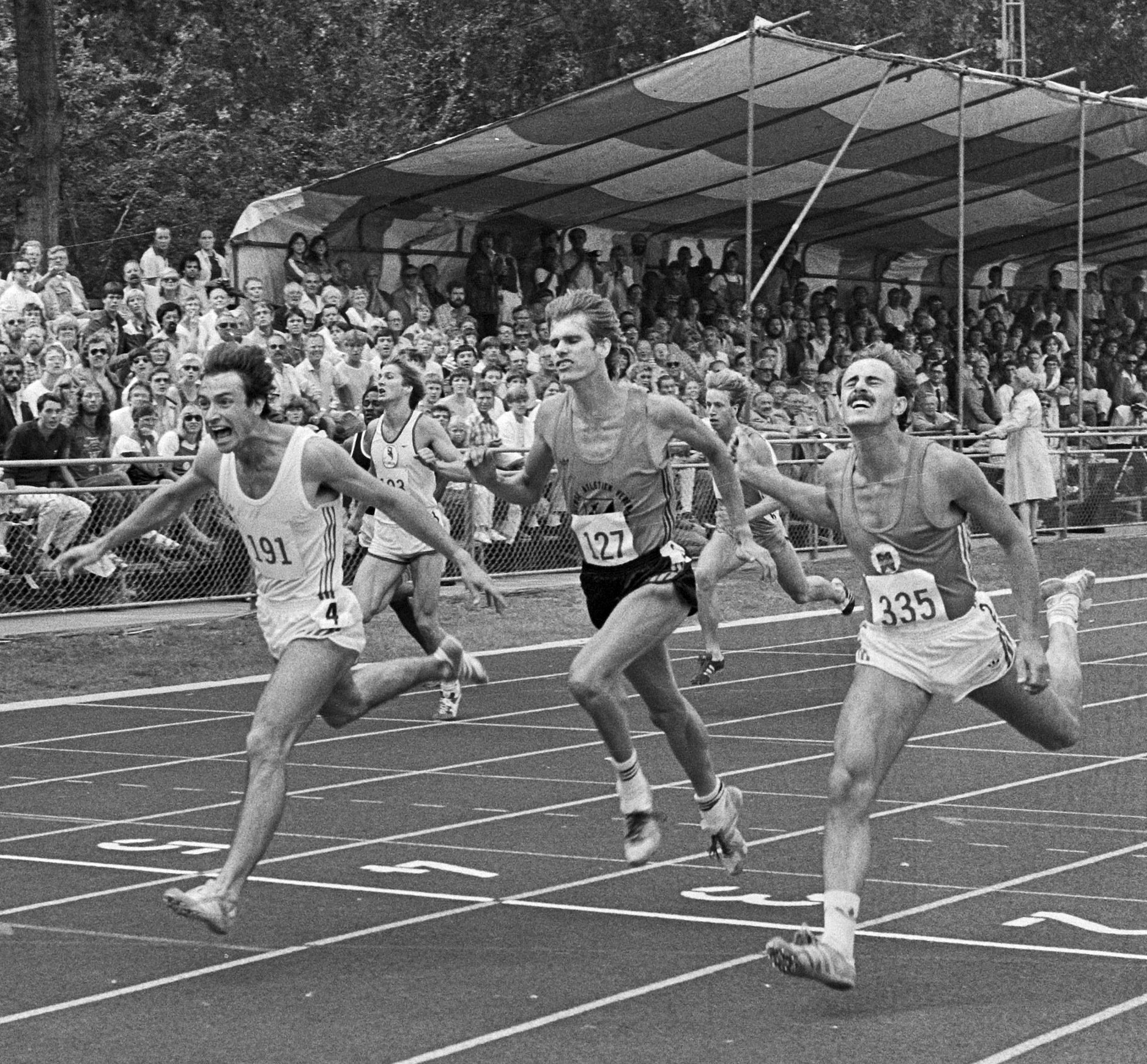
- Finish of the Dutch 200 m championships in 1982. Left-right: Mario Westbroek (winner), Henk Brouwer and Marcel Klarenbeek

Personal information
- Born: 1 June 1960 (age 66) Amsterdam, the Netherlands
- Height: 1.82 m (6 ft 0 in)
- Weight: 76 kg (168 lb)

Sport
- Sport: Sprint
- Club: SOS, Almelo
Medal record
Representing Netherlands
Summer Universiade
Silver medal – second place	1979 Mexico City	4x400m relay

Marcel Klarenbeek (born 1 June 1960) is a retired Dutch sprinter. He competed in the 400 m and 4 × 400 m relay at the 1980 Summer Olympics, but failed to reach the finals.
