= Athletics at the 1979 Summer Universiade =

Athletics at the X Summer Universiade
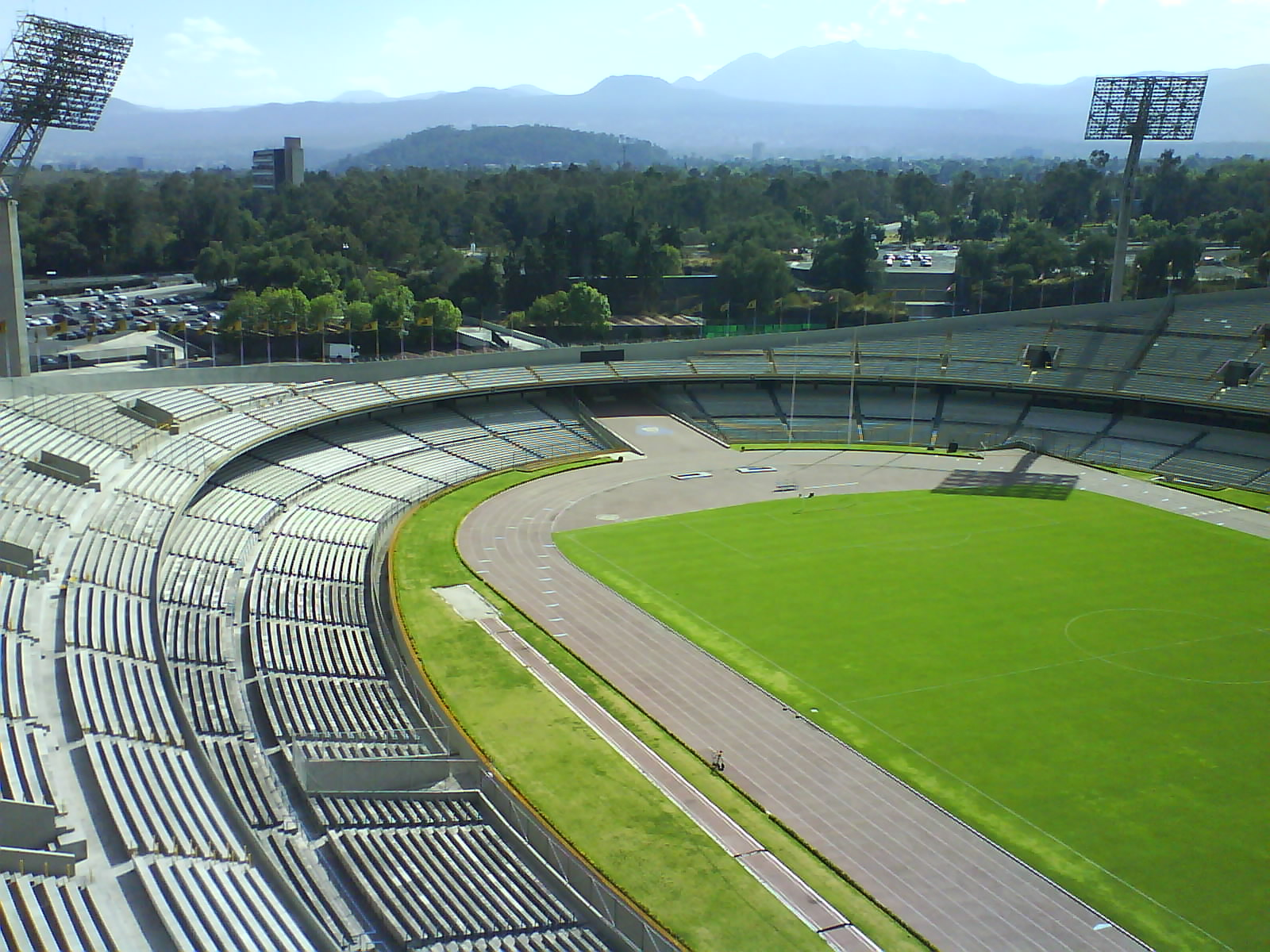
- The host stadium for the events
- Dates: 8–13 September 1979
- Host city: Mexico City, Mexico
- Venue: Estadio Olimpico Universitario
- Level: University
- Events: 34
- Records set: 1 WR, 12 UR

Athletics events were contested at the 1979 Summer Universiade in Mexico City, Mexico between 8 and 13 September.

== Medal summary ==
=== Men's events ===
Event	Gold		Silver		Bronze	
100 metres (wind: 0.0 m/s)	Mike Roberson (USA)	10.19	Leszek Dunecki (POL)	10.30	Ainsley Bennett (GBR)	10.38
200 metres (wind: +1.8 m/s)	Pietro Mennea (ITA)	19.72 WR	Leszek Dunecki (POL)	20.24	Ainsley Bennett (GBR)	20.42
400 metres	Harald Schmid (FRG)	44.98	Franz-Peter Hofmeister (FRG)	45.12	Walter McCoy (USA)	45.90
800 metres	Evans White (USA)	1:48.87	Garry Cook (GBR)	1:49.50	Hans-Peter Ferner (FRG)	1:49.77
1500 metres	Graham Williamson (GBR)	3:45.37	Pierre Délèze (SUI)	3:45.8	Richie Harris (USA)	3:46.4
5000 metres	Ilie Floroiu (ROM)	14:12.9	José Gómez (MEX)	14:15.4	Enrique Aquino (MEX)	14:18.0
10,000 metres	Ilie Floroiu (ROM)	29:56.1	Enrique Aquino (MEX)	30:16.4	Samuel Nyariki (KEN)	30:49.1
110 metres hurdles (wind: +0.3 m/s)	Andrey Prokofyev (URS)	13.50	Thomas Munkelt (GDR)	13.50	Aleksandr Puchkov (URS)	13.55
400 metres hurdles	Harry Schulting (NED)	48.44 UR	Vasyl Arkhypenko (URS)	48.60	James Walker (USA)	48.88
3000 metres steeplechase	Paul Copu (ROM)	8:57.7	Mariano Scartezzini (ITA)	8:58.1	Michele Cina (ITA)	9:08.7
4 × 100 metres relay	Italy (ITA); Gianfranco Lazzer; Luciano Caravani; Giovanni Grazioli; Pietro Mennea	38.42 UR	Ivory Coast (CIV); Patrice Ouré; Amadou Meïté; Avognan Nogboum; Georges Kablan Degnan	38.73	France (FRA); Jean Gracia; Pierrick Thessard; Gabriel Brothier; Pascal Barré	39.07
4 × 400 metres relay	United States (USA); Fred Taylor; Leslie Kerr; Ronnie Harris; Walter McCoy	3:00.98	Netherlands (NED); Hugo Pont; Koen Gijsbers; Marcel Klarenbeek; Harry Schulting	3:03.18	Italy (ITA); Stefano Malinverni; Alfonso Di Guida; Flavio Borghi; Roberto Tozzi	3:03.80
High jump	Gerd Nagel (FRG)	2.28 UR	Rolf Beilschmidt (GDR)	2.28 UR	Holger Marten (FRG)	2.26
Pole vault	Władysław Kozakiewicz (POL)	5.60	Philippe Houvion (FRA)	5.60	Patrick Abada (FRA)	5.55
Long jump	Valeriy Pidluzhnyy (URS)	8.16	Junichi Usui (JPN)	8.05	LaMonte King (USA)	7.99
Triple jump	Willie Banks (USA)	17.23	Jaak Uudmäe (URS)	17.20	Roberto Mazzucato (ITA)	16.87
Shot put	Udo Beyer (GDR)	20.49	Reijo Ståhlberg (FIN)	19.96	Nikolai Khristov (BUL)	19.60
Discus throw	Wolfgang Schmidt (GDR)	60.78	Markku Tuokko (FIN)	59.82	Antonín Wybraniec (TCH)	58.32
Hammer throw	Klaus Ploghaus (FRG)	75.74 UR	Manfred Hüning (FRG)	75.68	Yuriy Sedykh (URS)	75.54
Javelin throw	Helmut Schreiber (FRG)	88.68 UR	Arto Härkönen (FIN)	87.10	Heino Puuste (URS)	82.62
Decathlon	Sepp Zeilbauer (AUT)	8203 UR	Jürgen Hingsen (FRG)	8033	Heinz Antretter (FRG)	7868

=== Women's events ===
Event	Gold		Silver		Bronze	
100 metres (wind: 0.0 m/s)	Marlies Göhr (GDR)	11.00 UR	Kathy Smallwood (GBR)	11.27	Beverley Goddard (GBR)	11.32
200 metres (wind: +1.9 m/s)	Marita Koch (GDR)	21.91 UR	Kathy Smallwood (GBR)	22.70	Beverley Goddard (GBR)	22.76
400 metres	Mariya Kulchunova (URS)	50.35 UR	Rosalyn Bryant (USA)	51.35	Christina Brehmer (GDR)	51.59
800 metres	Nadezhda Mushta (URS)	2:00.50	Olga Dvirna (URS)	2:00.77	Fiţa Lovin (ROM)	2:00.81
1500 metres	Natalia Mărăşescu (ROM)	4:13.9	Olga Dvirna (URS)	4:14.5	Valentina Ilyinykh (URS)	4:14.6
100 metres hurdles (wind: 0.0 m/s)	Lucyna Langer (POL)	12.62 UR	Danuta Perka (POL)	12.66	Vera Komisova (URS)	12.90
4 × 100 metres relay	Soviet Union (URS); Vera Komisova; Vera Anisimova; Tatyana Prorochenko; Olga Korotkova	43.14	Great Britain (GBR); Yvette Wray; Kathy Smallwood; Ruth Kennedy; Bev Goddard	43.26	France (FRA); Odile Madkaud; Jacqueline Curtet; Marie-Pierre Philippe; Chantal Réga	43.94
High jump	Andrea Mátay (HUN)	1.94	Ulrike Meyfarth (FRG)	1.92	Sara Simeoni (ITA)	1.92
Long jump	Anita Stukāne (URS)	6.80	Jodi Anderson (USA)	6.67	Tatyana Skachko (URS)	6.57
Shot put	Ilona Slupianek (GDR)	19.98	Helma Knorscheidt (GDR)	19.56	Mihaela Loghin (ROM)	19.41
Discus throw	Svetlana Melnikova (URS)	63.54	Evelin Jahl (GDR)	63.00	Florenţa Ţacu (ROM)	59.28
Javelin throw	Éva Ráduly-Zörgő (ROM)	67.20	Ivanka Vancheva (BUL)	63.04	Mayra Vila (CUB)	60.98
Pentathlon	Yekaterina Smirnova (URS)	4497	Sylvia Barlag (NED)	4306	Ina Losch (FRG)	4272

== Medal table ==
Rank	Nation	Gold	Silver	Bronze	Total
1	Soviet Union (URS)	8	4	6	18
2	East Germany (GDR)	5	4	1	10
3	Romania (ROM)	5	0	3	8
4	West Germany (FRG)	4	4	4	12
5	United States (USA)	4	2	4	10
6	Poland (POL)	2	3	0	5
7	Italy (ITA)	2	1	4	7
8	Great Britain (GBR)	1	4	4	9
9	Netherlands (NED)	1	2	0	3
10	Austria (AUT)	1	0	0	1
10	Hungary (HUN)	1	0	0	1
12	Finland (FIN)	0	3	0	3
13	Mexico (MEX)	0	2	1	3
14	France (FRA)	0	1	3	4
15	Bulgaria (BUL)	0	1	1	2
16	Ivory Coast (CIV)	0	1	0	1
16	Japan (JPN)	0	1	0	1
16	Switzerland (SUI)	0	1	0	1
19	Cuba (CUB)	0	0	1	1
19	Czechoslovakia (TCH)	0	0	1	1
19	Kenya (KEN)	0	0	1	1
Totals (21 entries)		34	34	34	102

== See also ==
- 1979 in the sport of athletics
- FISU World University Games
- University and college sport
