= 1977 European Cup "A" Final =

These are the full results of the 1977 European Cup "A" Final in athletics which was held at the Olympic Stadium on 13 and 14 August 1977 in Helsinki, Finland.

== Team standings ==
Men
Pos.	Nation	Points
1	East Germany	125
2	West Germany	113
3	Soviet Union	100
4	Great Britain	95
5	Poland	93
6	France	70
7	Finland	66
8	Italy	54

Women
Pos.	Nation	Points
1	East Germany	106
2	Soviet Union	94
3	West Germany	68
	Great Britain	68
5	Poland	58
6	Romania	55
7	Bulgaria	53
8	Finland	36

== Men's results ==
=== 100 metres ===
13 August
Wind: 0.0 m/s

Rank	Lane	Name	Nationality	Time	Notes	Points
1	7	Eugen Ray	East Germany	10.12	CR, NR	8
2	2	Pietro Mennea	Italy	10.29		7
3	6	Valeriy Borzov	Soviet Union	10.33		6
4	1	Ainsley Bennett	Great Britain	10.48		5
5	5	Lucien Sainte-Rose	France	10.52		4
6	2	Werner Bastians	West Germany	10.60		3
7	3	Antti Rajamäki	Finland	10.64		2
8	8	Marian Woronin	Poland	10.73		1

=== 200 metres ===
14 August
Wind: -2.4 m/s

Rank	Name	Nationality	Time	Notes	Points
1	Eugen Ray	East Germany	20.86		8
2	Valeriy Borzov	Soviet Union	21.10		7
3	Ainsley Bennett	Great Britain	21.27		6
4	Ossi Karttunen	Finland	21.35		5
5	Joseph Arame	France	21.48		4
6	Luciano Caravani	Italy	21.65		3
7	Michael Gruse	West Germany	21.80		2
8	Zenon Licznerski	Poland	21.82		1

=== 400 metres ===
13 August

Rank	Name	Nationality	Time	Notes	Points
1	Bernd Herrmann	West Germany	45.92		8
2	Ryszard Podlas	Poland	46.00		7
3	Francis Demarthon	France	46.38		6
4	David Jenkins	Great Britain	46.40		5
5	Reinhard Kokot	East Germany	46.80		4
6	Alfonso Di Guida	Italy	47.04		3
7	Valeriy Yurchenko	Soviet Union	47.53		2
8	Hannu Mäkelä	Finland	47.73		1

=== 800 metres ===
14 August

Rank	Name	Nationality	Time	Notes	Points
1	Willi Wülbeck	West Germany	1:47.21		8
2	Olaf Beyer	East Germany	1:47.29		7
3	José Marajo	France	1:47.49		6
4	Sebastian Coe	Great Britain	1:47.61		5
5	Marian Gęsicki	Poland	1:47.69		4
6	Vladimir Ponomaryov	Soviet Union	1:47.74		3
7	Ari Paunonen	Finland	1:47.93		2
8	Gabriele Ferrero	Italy	1:48.80		1

=== 1500 metres ===
13 August

Rank	Name	Nationality	Time	Notes	Points
1	Steve Ovett	Great Britain	3:44.94		8
2	Thomas Wessinghage	West Germany	3:45.38		7
3	Ari Paunonen	Finland	3:45.90		6
4	Henryk Wasilewski	Poland	3:45.93		5
5	Francis Gonzalez	France	3:46.56		4
6	Jürgen Straub	East Germany	3:46.58		3
7	Anatoliy Mamontov	Soviet Union	3:46.60		2
8	Mariano Scartezzini	Italy	3:48.67		1

=== 5000 metres ===
14 August

Rank	Name	Nationality	Time	Notes	Points
1	Nick Rose	Great Britain	13:27.84	CR	8
2	Enn Sellik	Soviet Union	13:29.20		7
3	Karl Fleschen	West Germany	13:29.44		6
4	Manfred Kuschmann	East Germany	13:33.42		5
5	Ryszard Kopijasz	Poland	13:42.16		4
6	Jacques Boxberger	France	13:45.50		3
7	Luigi Zarcone	Italy	13:50.41		2
8	Pekka Päivärinta	Finland	14:12.86		1

=== 10,000 metres ===
13 August

Rank	Name	Nationality	Time	Notes	Points
1	Jörg Peter	East Germany	27:55.50	CR	8
2	Detlef Uhlemann	West Germany	27:58.79		7
3	Leonid Moseyev	Soviet Union	28:03.60		6
4	Martti Vainio	Finland	28:07.23		5
5	Jerzy Kowol	Poland	28:09.96	NR	4
6	Franco Fava	Italy	28:11.59		3
7	Jean-Paul Gomez	France	28:15.66		2
8	Tony Simmons	Great Britain	29:03.97		1

=== 110 metres hurdles ===
14 August
Wind: +2.0 m/s

Rank	Name	Nationality	Time	Notes	Points
1	Thomas Munkelt	East Germany	13.37	CR	8
2	Jan Pusty	Poland	13.60		7
3	Eduard Pereverzev	Soviet Union	13.63		6
4	Arto Bryggare	Finland	13.66		5
5	Berwyn Price	Great Britain	13.87		4
6	Giuseppe Buttari	Italy	14.18		3
7	Thierry Sellier	France	14.57		2
	Dieter Gebhard	West Germany	DNF		0

=== 400 metres hurdles ===
13 August

Rank	Name	Nationality	Time	Notes	Points
1	Volker Beck	East Germany	48.90	CR, NR	8
2	Harald Schmid	West Germany	49.27		7
3	Alan Pascoe	Great Britain	49.65		6
4	Jerzy Hewelt	Poland	50.44		5
5	Vasyl Arkhypenko	Soviet Union	50.56		4
6	Raimo Alanen	Finland	51.02		3
7	Lucien Baggio	France	51.24		2
8	Lorenzo Brigante	Italy	51.96		1

=== 3000 metres steeplechase ===
14 August

Rank	Name	Nationality	Time	Notes	Points
1	Michael Karst	West Germany	8:27.87		8
2	Frank Baumgartl	East Germany	8:31.53		7
3	Tapio Kantanen	Finland	8:33.27		6
4	Dennis Coates	Great Britain	8:33.94		5
5	Franco Fava	Italy	8:37.06		4
6	Vladimir Filonov	Soviet Union	8:38.55		3
7	Krzysztof Wesołowski	Poland	8:40.94		2
8	Philippe Gauthier	France	9:12.09		1

=== 4 × 100 metres relay ===
13 August

Rank	Lane	Nation	Athletes	Time	Note	Points
1	5	East Germany	Manfred Kokot, Eugen Ray, Detlef Kübeck, Alexander Thieme	38.84	CR	8
2	4	Soviet Union	Nikolay Kolesnikov, Aleksandr Aksinin, Juris Silovs, Valeriy Borzov	39.27		7
3	6	Poland	Andrzej Świerczyński, Zenon Licznerski, Zenon Nowosz, Leszek Dunecki	39.38		6
4	7	West Germany	Werner Bastians, Dieter Gebhard, Dieter Steinmann, Michael Gruse	39.74		5
5	1	Great Britain	Ainsley Bennett, Allan Wells, Tim Bonsor, Steve Green	39.84		4
6	3	France	Éric Bigon, Joseph Arame, Lucien Sainte-Rose, Jacques Rousseau	39.84		3
7	2	Finland	Antti Rajamäki, Ossi Karttunen, Markku Juhola, Raimo Räty	40.51		2
	8	Italy	Stefano Curini, Luciano Caravani, Pietro Farina, Pietro Mennea	DQ		0

=== 4 × 400 metres relay ===
14 August

Rank	Nation	Athletes	Time	Note	Points
1	West Germany	Lothar Krieg, Harald Schmid, Franz-Peter Hofmeister, Bernd Herrmann	3:02.66	CR	8
2	East Germany	Reinhard Kokot, Jürgen Pfennig, Gόnter Arnold, Volker Beck	3:03.23	NR	7
3	Poland	Cezary Łapiński, Henryk Galant, Jerzy Pietrzyk, Ryszard Podlas	3:03.83		6
4	Great Britain	Steve Scutt, Danny Laing, Glen Cohen, David Jenkins	3:04.82		5
5	France	Robert Froissart, Jean-Claude Nallet, Lionel Malingre, Francis Demarthon	3:05.22		4
6	Finland	Matti Rusanen, Juhani Tiihonen, Hannu Mäkelä, Markku Kukkoaho	3:07.12		3
7	Soviet Union	Vladimir Yevstyunin, Viktor Burakov, Vasyl Arkhypenko, Valeriy Yurchenko	3:07.47		2
8	Italy	Stefano Malinverni, Roberto Tozzi, Daniele Zanini, Alfonso Di Guida	3:09.07		1

=== High jump ===
13 August

Rank	Name	Nationality	Result	Notes	Points
1	Rolf Beilschmidt	East Germany	2.31	CR	8
2	Jacek Wszoła	Poland	2.28		7
3	Aleksandr Grigoryev	Soviet Union	2.20		6
4	Bruno Bruni	Italy	2.20		5
5	Carlo Thränhardt	West Germany	2.20		4
6	Paul Poaniewa	France	2.11		3
7	Mike Butterfield	Great Britain	2.08		2
~~8~~	Asko Pesonen	Finland	~~2.08~~	DQ, Doping	0

=== Pole vault ===
14 August

Rank	Name	Nationality	Result	Notes	Points
1	Władysław Kozakiewicz	Poland	5.60	CR	8
2	Antti Kalliomäki	Finland	5.35		7
3	Günther Lohre	West Germany	5.30		6
4	Brian Hooper	Great Britain	5.30		5
5	Jean-Michel Bellot	France	5.25		4
6	Renato Dionisi	Italy	5.20		3
7	Axel Weber	East Germany	5.20		2
8	Vladimir Kishkun	Soviet Union	5.00		1

=== Long jump ===
13 August

Rank	Name	Nationality	#1	#2	#3	#4	#5	#6	Result	Notes	Points
1	Jacques Rousseau	France	7.95	x	x	x	8.05	7.96	8.05		8
2	Valeriy Pidluzhny	Soviet Union	7.76	6.65	7.84	7.94	7.88	7.90	7.94		7
3	Roy Mitchell	Great Britain	5.07	7.72	x	7.94	7.90	7.94		6	
4	Hans Baumgartner	West Germany						7.72		5	
5	Uwe Lange	East Germany						7.68		4	
6	Maurizio Siega	Italy						7.66		3	
7	Andrzej Korniak	Poland						7.55		2	
8	Erkki Päivärinta	Finland						7.44		1	

=== Triple jump ===
14 August

Rank	Name	Nationality	#1	#2	#3	#4	#5	#6	Result	Notes	Points
1	Anatoliy Piskulin	Soviet Union	17.09w	16.69	x	x	x	16.56	17.09w		8
2	Pentti Kuukasjärvi	Finland	16.32	15.93	15.79	x	15.88	15.99	16.32		7
3	Eugeniusz Biskupski	Poland	15.99w	15.76	14.05	16.09	15.90	16.19	16.19		6
4	Keith Connor	Great Britain						16.17		5	
5	Bernard Lamitié	France						16.07		4	
6	Wolfgang Kolmsee	West Germany						15.94		3	
7	Klaus Hufnagel	East Germany						15.93		2	
8	Roberto Mazzucato	Italy						15.82		1	

=== Shot put ===
13 August

Rank	Name	Nationality	#1	#2	#3	#4	#5	#6	Result	Notes	Points
1	Udo Beyer	East Germany	21.65	21.50	20.98	20.66	21.14	20.90	21.65	CR	8
2	Reijo Ståhlberg	Finland	19.85	20.59	20.90	x	x	x	20.90		7
3	Ralf Reichenbach	West Germany	20.30	19.99	20.42	20.42	19.86	x	20.42		6
4	Geoff Capes	Great Britain							20.15		5
5	Władysław Komar	Poland							19.71		4
6	Marco Montelatici	Italy							19.09		3
7	Anatoliy Yarosh	Soviet Union							19.04		2
8	Arnjolt Beer	France							18.07		1

=== Discus throw ===
14 August

Rank	Name	Nationality	#1	#2	#3	#4	#5	#6	Result	Notes	Points
1	Wolfgang Schmidt	East Germany	64.44	63.34	x	66.86	65.02	x	66.86	CR	8
~~2~~	Markku Tuokko	Finland	~~x~~	~~64.10~~	~~67.06~~	~~x~~	~~63.56~~	~~66.42~~	~~66.42~~	DQ, Doping	0
2	Nikolay Vikhor	Soviet Union	60.46	x	61.50	58.46	x	x	61.50		7
3	Stanisław Wołodko	Poland							61.20		6
4	Hein-Direck Neu	West Germany							60.68		5
5	Silvano Simeon	Italy							57.98		4
6	Frédéric Piette	France							57.08		3
7	John Hillier	Great Britain							53.92		2

=== Hammer throw ===
13 August

Rank	Name	Nationality	#1	#2	#3	#4	#5	#6	Result	Notes	Points
1	Karl-Hans Riehm	West Germany	75.90	75.64	75.38	x	75.08	x	75.90		8
2	Jochen Sachse	East Germany	71.34	69.64	70.82	74.60	73.14	71.52	74.60		7
3	Yuriy Sedykh	Soviet Union	70.22	72.62	73.60	72.28	72.68	73.34	73.60		6
4	Chris Black	Great Britain							71.18		5
5	Giampaolo Urlando	Italy							70.34		4
6	Juha Tiainen	Finland							70.12		3
7	Philippe Suriray	France							66.12		2
8	Ireneusz Golda	Poland							65.74		1

=== Javelin throw ===
14 August – Old model

Rank	Name	Nationality	#1	#2	#3	#4	#5	#6	Result	Notes	Points
1	Nikolay Grebnyev	Soviet Union	78.54	77.64	81.28	83.10	84.38	87.18	87.18		8
~~2~~	Seppo Hovinen	Finland	~~83.98~~	~~x~~	~~x~~	~~x~~	~~84.06~~	~~78.50~~	~~84.06~~	DQ, Doping	0
2	Piotr Bielczyk	Poland	78.62	73.08	69.18	73.08	79.62	78.68	79.62		7
3	Michael Wessing	West Germany							79.56		6
4	Wolfgang Hanisch	East Germany							79.04		5
5	Penitio Lutui	France							74.42		4
6	David Ottley	Great Britain							72.70		3
7	Vincenzo Marchetti	Italy							66.64		2

== Women's results ==
=== 100 metres ===
13 August
Wind: +1.0 m/s

Rank	Name	Nationality	Time	Notes	Points
1	Marlies Oelsner	East Germany	11.07	CR	8
2	Sonia Lannaman	Great Britain	11.22		7
3	Irena Szewińska	Poland	11.26		6
4	Lyudmila Maslakova	Soviet Union	11.32		5
5	Elvira Possekel	West Germany	11.57		4
6	Ivanka Valkova	Bulgaria	11.60		3
7	Mona-Lisa Pursiainen	Finland	11.64		2
8	Veronica Buia	Romania	11.77		1

=== 200 metres ===
14 August
Wind: -0.8 m/s

Rank	Name	Nationality	Time	Notes	Points
1	Irena Szewińska	Poland	22.71		8
2	Sonia Lannaman	Great Britain	22.83		7
3	Bärbel Eckert	East Germany	22.99		6
4	Marina Sidorova	Soviet Union	23.28		5
5	Dagmar Schenten	West Germany	23.61		4
6	Pirjo Häggman	Finland	24.02		3
7	Ivanka Valkova	Bulgaria	24.29		2
8	Veronica Buia	Romania	24.52		1

=== 400 metres ===
13 August

Rank	Name	Nationality	Time	Notes	Points
1	Marita Koch	East Germany	49.53	CR	8
2	Marina Sidorova	Soviet Union	51.20		7
3	Donna Hartley	Great Britain	51.62		6
4	Pirjo Häggman	Finland	52.11		5
5	Dagmar Fuhrmann	West Germany	52.12		4
6	Elena Tărîță	Romania	52.36		3
7	Elżbieta Katolik	Poland	53.06		2
8	Svetla Koleva	Bulgaria	54.26		1

=== 800 metres ===
13 August

Rank	Name	Nationality	Time	Notes	Points
1	Christina Liebetrau	East Germany	2:00.17		8
2	Totka Petrova	Bulgaria	2:00.18		7
3	Svetlana Styrkina	Soviet Union	2:00.96		6
4	Ileana Silai	Romania	2:01.28		5
5	Elisabeth Schacht	West Germany	2:01.61		4
6	Jolanta Januchta	Poland	2:01.97		3
7	Jane Colebrook	Great Britain	2:02.98		2
8	Sinikka Tyynelä	Finland	2:03.48	NR	1

=== 1500 metres ===
14 August

Rank	Name	Nationality	Time	Notes	Points
1	Tatyana Kazankina	Soviet Union	4:04.35	CR	8
2	Ulrike Bruns	East Germany	4:04.52		7
3	Natalia Mărășescu	Romania	4:05.08		6
4	Vesela Yatsinska	Bulgaria	4:05.35		5
5	Sinikka Tyynelä	Finland	4:06.01	NR	4
6	Elisabeth Schacht	West Germany	4:09.95		3
7	Celina Sokołowska	Poland	4:10.75	NR	2
8	Hilary Hollick	Great Britain	4:21.86		1

=== 3000 metres ===
14 August

Rank	Name	Nationality	Time	Notes	Points
1	Lyudmila Bragina	Soviet Union	8:49.86		8
2	Maricica Puică	Romania	8:50.96		7
3	Gabriele Veith	East Germany	8:53.91	NR	6
4	Ann Ford	Great Britain	8:55.92		5
5	Brigitte Kraus	West Germany	9:01.29	NR	4
6	Rumyana Chavdarova	Bulgaria	9:06.28		3
7	Bronisława Ludwichowska	Poland	9:14.40		2
8	Aila Paunonen	Finland	9:35.22		1

=== 100 metres hurdles ===
14 August
Wind: 0.0 m/s

Rank	Name	Nationality	Time	Notes	Points
1	Johanna Klier	East Germany	12.83		8
2	Natalya Lebedeva	Soviet Union	13.08		7
3	Bożena Nowakowska	Poland	13.29		6
4	Sharon Colyear	Great Britain	13.48		5
5	Lidia Guseva	Bulgaria	13.64		4
6	Sylvia Kempin	West Germany	13.76		3
7	Ulla Lempiäinen	Finland	13.87		2
8	Elena Mirza	Romania	14.22		1

=== 400 metres hurdles ===
13 August

Rank	Name	Nationality	Time	Notes	Points
1	Karin Roßley	East Germany	55.63	WR	8
2	Tatyana Storocheva	Soviet Union	56.84		7
3	Krystyna Kacperczyk	Poland	57.01		6
4	Erika Weinstein	West Germany	57.36		5
5	Christine Warden	Great Britain	58.51		4
6	Alexandra Badescu	Romania	59.28		3
7	Zlatina Ilieva	Bulgaria	59.55		2
8	Tuija Helander	Finland	1:01.39		1

=== 4 × 100 metres relay ===
13 August

Rank	Nation	Athletes	Time	Note	Points
1	East Germany	Monika Hamann, Romy Schneider, Ingrid Brestrich, Marlies Oelsner	42.62	CR	8
2	Soviet Union	Tatyana Prorochenko, Lyudmila Maslakova, Marina Sidorova, Lyudmila Storozhkova	43.43		7
3	West Germany	Elvira Possekel, Dagmar Schenten, Petra Sharp, Annegret Richter	43.72		6
4	Poland	Ewa Długołęcka, Małgorzata Bogucka, Elżbieta Kaniecka, Irena Szewińska	43.74		5
5	Great Britain	Wendy Clarke, Sonia Lannaman, Sharon Colyear, Andrea Lynch	43.74		4
6	Bulgaria	Sofka Popova, Ivanka Valkova, Lyubina Dimitrova, Galina Penkova	44.72		3
7	Finland	Helinä Laihorinne, Mona-Lisa Pursiainen, Yvonne Hannus, Barbro Lindström	45.32		2
8	Romania	Otilia Șomănescu, Eugenia Baciu, Elena Mirza, Veronica Buia	47.28		1

=== 4 × 400 metres relay ===
14 August

Rank	Nation	Athletes	Time	Note	Points
1	East Germany	Bettina Popp, Barbara Krug, Christina Brehmer, Marita Koch	3:23.70	CR	8
2	Soviet Union	Lyudmila Aksenova, Svetlana Styrkina, Tatyana Prorochenko, Natalya Sokolova	3:26.62		7
3	Poland	Krystyna Kacperczyk, Elżbieta Katolik, Barbara Kwietniewska, Irena Szewińska	3:27.76		6
4	Great Britain	Ruth Kennedy, Gladys McCormack, Verona Elder, Donna Hartley	3:28.78		5
5	West Germany	Marlies Kühn, Erika Weinstein, Elke Decker, Dagmar Fuhrmann	3:31.95		4
6	Finland	Yvonne Hannus, Mona-Lisa Pursiainen, Barbro Lindström, Pirjo Häggman	3:37.78		3
7	Bulgaria	Violeta Tsvetkova, Svetla Koleva, Angelina Khristova, Totka Petrova	3:37.78		2
	Romania		DQ		0

=== High jump ===
14 August

Rank	Name	Nationality	Result	Notes	Points
1	Rosemarie Ackermann	East Germany	1.97	WR	8
2	Brigitte Holzapfel	West Germany	1.88		7
3	Cornelia Popa	Romania	1.84		6
4	Brenda Gibbs	Great Britain	1.84		5
5	Yordanka Blagoeva	Bulgaria	1.84		4
6	Susann Sundkvist	Finland	1.82		3
7	Tatyana Boyko	Soviet Union	1.82		2
8	Danuta Bułkowska	Poland	1.79		1

=== Long jump ===
14 August

Rank	Name	Nationality	#1	#2	#3	#4	#5	#6	Result	Notes	Points
1	Brigitte Künzel	East Germany	x	6.44	6.76	6.30	x	6.28	6.76		8
2	Christa Striezel	West Germany	6.14	6.39	x	6.17	x	6.05	6.39		7
3	Sue Reeve	Great Britain	x	6.35	6.35	6.35	6.30	6.28	6.35		6
4	Alina Gheorghiu	Romania							6.35		5
5	Tatyana Skachko	Soviet Union							6.34		4
6	Lidia Gusheva	Bulgaria							6.26		3
7	Anna Włodarczyk	Poland							6.23		2
8	Pirkko Helenius	Finland							6.00		1

=== Shot put ===
14 August

Rank	Name	Nationality	#1	#2	#3	#4	#5	#6	Result	Notes	Points
~~1~~	Ilona Slupianek	East Germany	~~20.76~~	~~21.20~~	~~21.11~~	~~20.84~~	~~20.81~~	~~x~~	~~21.20~~	DQ, Doping	0
1	Eva Wilms	West Germany	19.30	20.01	19.95	x	19.69	x	20.01		8
2	Esfir Krachevskaya	Soviet Union	19.21	18.41	19.76	19.09	x	19.51	19.76		7
3	Radostina Bakhchevanova	Bulgaria							17.75		6
4	Valentina Groapa	Romania							17.70		5
5	Beata Habrzyk	Poland							16.52		4
6	Judy Oakes	Great Britain							15.65		3
7	Ritva Metso	Finland							15.08		2

=== Discus throw ===
13 August

Rank	Name	Nationality	#1	#2	#3	#4	#5	#6	Result	Notes	Points
1	Faina Melnik	Soviet Union	67.32	52.32	x	68.08	x	x	68.08		8
2	Sabine Engel	East Germany	60.64	62.98	60.52	64.20	65.60	63.18	65.60		7
3	Argentina Menis	Romania	61.42	61.66	x	60.74	x	62.22	62.22		6
4	Sinikka Salminen	Finland							55.44		5
5	Lenka Strelyova	Bulgaria							54.96		4
6	Krystyna Nadolna	Poland							54.64		3
7	Ingra Manecke	West Germany							53.90		2
8	Meg Ritchie	Great Britain							52.40		1

=== Javelin throw ===
13 August – Old model

Rank	Name	Nationality	#1	#2	#3	#4	#5	#6	Result	Notes	Points
1	Ruth Fuchs	East Germany	x	62.22	68.92	67.46	x	x	68.92	CR	8
2	Tessa Sanderson	Great Britain	55.46	62.36	59.66	62.28	x	x	62.36		7
3	Nadezhda Yakubovich	Soviet Union	61.84	x	x	59.14	56.12	x	61.84		6
4	Éva Zörgő	Romania							60.16		5
5	Ivanka Vancheva	Bulgaria							59.98		4
6	Marion Becker	West Germany							57.30		3
7	Bernadetta Blechacz	Poland							55.46		2
8	Ritva Metso	Finland							53.20		1
