= 1977 European Cup (athletics) =

- Host city: Helsinki, Finland
- Level: Senior
- Type: Outdoor
- Events: 35

The 1977 European Cup was the 6th edition of the European Cup of athletics.

It was the first edition to introduce "A" and "B" Finals. The three best non-qualifying teams in the Semifinals would now compete in the "B" Final, the winner of which would qualify for the "A" Final.

The "A" Finals were held in Helsinki, Finland. The first two teams in those qualified for the inaugural IAAF World Cup.

== "A" Final ==
Held in Helsinki on 13 and 14 August for both men and women.

=== Team standings ===
Men
Pos.	Nation	Points
1	East Germany	125
2	West Germany	113
3	Soviet Union	100
4	Great Britain	95
5	Poland	93
6	France	70
7	Finland	66
8	Italy	54

Women
Pos.	Nation	Points
1	East Germany	106
2	Soviet Union	94
3	West Germany	68
	Great Britain	68
5	Poland	58
6	Romania	55
7	Bulgaria	53
8	Finland	36

=== Results summary ===
==== Men's events ====
Event	Gold		Silver		Bronze	
100 m (Wind: 0.0 m/s)	Eugen Ray; East Germany	10.12; NR, CR	Pietro Mennea; Italy	10.29	Valeriy Borzov; Soviet Union	10.33
200 m (Wind: -1.2 m/s)	Eugen Ray; East Germany	20.86	Valeriy Borzov; Soviet Union	21.10	Ainsley Bennett; Great Britain	21.27
400 m	Bernd Herrmann; West Germany	45.92	Ryszard Podlas; Poland	46.00	Francis Demarthon; France	46.38
800 m	Willi Wülbeck; West Germany	1:47.21	Olaf Beyer; East Germany	1:47.27	José Marajo; France	1:47.49
1500 m	Steve Ovett; Great Britain	3:44.94	Thomas Wessinghage; West Germany	3:45.38	Ari Paunonen; Finland	3:45.90
5000 m	Nick Rose; Great Britain	13:27.84 CR	Enn Sellik; Soviet Union	13:29.20	Karl Fleschen; West Germany	13:29.44
10,000 m	Jörg Peter; East Germany	27:55.50 CR	Detlef Uhlemann; West Germany	27:58.79	Leonid Moseyev; Soviet Union	28:03.60
3000 m steeplechase	Michael Karst; West Germany	8:27.87	Frank Baumgartl; East Germany	8:31.53	Tapio Kantanen; Finland	8:33.27
110 m hurdles (Wind: +2.0 m/s)	Thomas Munkelt; East Germany	13.37 CR	Jan Pusty; Poland	13.60	Eduard Pereverzev; Soviet Union	13.63
400 m hurdles	Volker Beck; East Germany	48.90 CR	Harald Schmid; West Germany	49.27	Alan Pascoe; Great Britain	49.65
4 × 100 m	East Germany; Manfred Kokot; Eugen Ray; Detlef Kübeck; Alexander Thieme	38.84 CR	Soviet Union; Nikolay Kolesnikov; Aleksandr Aksinin; Juris Silovs; Valeriy Borzov	39.27	Poland; Andrzej Świerczyński; Zenon Licznerski; Zenon Nowosz; Leszek Dunecki	39.74
4 × 400 m	West Germany; Lothar Krieg; Harald Schmid; Franz-Peter Hofmeister; Bernd Herrmann	3:02.66 CR	East Germany; Reinhard Kokot; Jürgen Pfennig; Günter Arnold; Volker Beck	3:03.23	Poland; Cezary Łapiński; Henryk Galant; Jerzy Pietrzyk; Ryszard Podlas	3:03.83
High jump	Rolf Beilschmidt; East Germany	2.31 CR	Jacek Wszoła; Poland	2.28	Aleksandr Grigoryev; Soviet Union	2.20
Pole vault	Władysław Kozakiewicz; Poland	5.60 CR	Antti Kalliomäki; Finland	5.35	Günther Lohre; West Germany	5.30
Long jump	Jacques Rousseau; France	8.05	Valeriy Podluzhniy; Soviet Union	7.94	Roy Mitchell; Great Britain	7.94
Triple jump	Anatoliy Piskulin; Soviet Union	17.09w	Pentti Kuukasjärvi; Finland	16.32	Eugeniusz Biskupski; Poland	16.19
Shot put	Udo Beyer; East Germany	21.65 CR	Reijo Ståhlberg; Finland	20.90	Ralf Reichenbach; West Germany	20.42
Discus throw	Wolfgang Schmidt; East Germany	66.86 CR	Nikolay Vikhor; Soviet Union	61.50	Stanisław Wołodko; Poland	61.20
Hammer throw	Karl-Hans Riehm; West Germany	75.90	Jochen Sachse; East Germany	74.60	Yuriy Sedykh; Soviet Union	73.60
Javelin throw	Nikolay Grebnyev; Soviet Union	87.18	Piotr Bielczyk; Poland	79.62	Michael Wessing; West Germany	79.56
WR world record | AR area record | CR championship record | GR games record | NR national record | OR Olympic record | PB personal best | SB season best | WL world leading (in a given season)

==== Women's events ====
Event	Gold		Silver		Bronze	
100 m (Wind: +1.0 m/s)	Marlies Oelsner; East Germany	11.07 CR	Sonia Lannaman; Great Britain	11.22	Irena Szewińska; Poland	11.26
200 m (Wind: -0.8 m/s)	Irena Szewińska; Poland	22.71	Sonia Lannaman; Great Britain	22.83	Bärbel Eckert; East Germany	22.99
400 m	Marita Koch; East Germany	49.53 CR	Marina Sidorova; Soviet Union	51.20	Donna Hartley; Great Britain	51.62
800 m	Christina Liebetrau; East Germany	2:00.17	Totka Petrova; Bulgaria	2:00.18	Svetlana Styrkina; Soviet Union	2:00.96
1500 m	Tatyana Kazankina; Soviet Union	4:04.35 CR	Ulrike Bruns; East Germany	4:04.52	Natalia Mărășescu; Romania	4:05.08
3000 m	Lyudmila Bragina; Soviet Union	8:49.86	Maricica Puica; Romania	8:50.96	Gabriele Meinel; East Germany	8:53.91
100 m hurdles (Wind: 0.0 m/s)	Johanna Klier; East Germany	12.83	Natalya Lebedeva; Soviet Union	13.08	Bożena Nowakowska; Poland	13.29
400 m hurdles	Karin Rossley; East Germany	55.63; WR	Tatyana Storosheva; Soviet Union	56.84	Krystyna Kacperczyk; Poland	57.01
4 × 100 m	East Germany; Monika Hamann; Romy Schneider; Ingrid Brestrich; Marlies Oelsner	42.62 CR	Soviet Union; Tatyana Prorochenko; Lyudmila Maslakova; Marina Sidorova; Lyudmila Storozhkova	43.43	West Germany; Elvira Possekel; Dagmar Schenten; Petra Sharp; Annegret Richter	43.72
4 × 400 m	East Germany; Bettina Popp; Barbara Krug; Christina Brehmer; Marita Koch	3:23.70 CR	Soviet Union; Lyudmila Aksenova; Svetlana Styrkina; Tatyana Prorochenko; Natalya Sokolova	3:26.62	Poland; Krystyna Kacperczyk; Elżbieta Katolik; Barbara Kwietniewska; Irena Szewińska	3:27.76
High jump	Rosemarie Ackermann; East Germany	1.97; WR, CR	Brigitte Holzapfel; West Germany	1.88	Cornelia Popa; Romania	1.84
Long jump	Brigitte Künzel; East Germany	6.76	Christa Striezel; West Germany	6.39	Sue Reeve; Great Britain	6.35
Shot put	Eva Wilms; West Germany	20.01	Svetlana Krachevskaya; Soviet Union	19.76	Radostina Bakhchevanova; Bulgaria	17.75
Discus throw	Faina Veleva; Soviet Union	68.08	Sabine Engel; East Germany	65.60	Argentina Menis; Romania	62.22
Javelin throw	Ruth Fuchs; East Germany	68.92 CR	Tessa Sanderson; Great Britain	62.36	Nadezhda Yakubovich; Soviet Union	61.84
WR world record | AR area record | CR championship record | GR games record | NR national record | OR Olympic record | PB personal best | SB season best | WL world leading (in a given season)

== "B" Final ==
The winners qualified for the "A" final.

Men
Held on 6 and 7 August in Gothenburg, Sweden

Pos.	Nation	Points
1	France	115
2	Sweden	108
3	Romania	94
4	Czechoslovakia	92
5	Switzerland	88
6	Yugoslavia	87
7	Hungary	78
8	Bulgaria	57

Women
Held on 6 August in Třinec, Czechoslovakia

Pos.	Nation	Points
1	Bulgaria	98
2	Italy	83
3	France	79
4	Hungary	76
5	Czechoslovakia	75
6	Belgium	63
7	Netherlands	38
8	Austria	27

== Semifinals ==
=== Men ===
All semifinals were held on 16 and 17 July. First two teams qualified for the "A" final (plus Finland as the host). Places 3–5 qualified for the "B" final.

Semifinal 1
Held in Athens, Greece

Pos.	Nation	Points
1	East Germany	132
2	Italy	117
3	Czechoslovakia	109
4	Finland	98
5	Hungary	86
6	Greece	77
7	Netherlands	59
8	Denmark	38

Semifinal 2
Held in Warsaw, Poland

Pos.	Nation	Points
1	West Germany	142
2	Poland	133
3	Romania	99
4	Bulgaria	87
5	Sweden	77
6	Spain	70
7	Norway	65
8	Portugal	45

Semifinal 3
Held in London, United Kingdom

Pos.	Nation	Points
1	Soviet Union	129
2	Great Britain	126
3	France	120
4	Switzerland	90
5	Yugoslavia	83
6	Belgium	78
7	Austria	54
8	Ireland	39

=== Women ===
All semifinals were held on 16 July. First two teams qualified for the "A" final (plus Finland as the host). Places 3–5 qualified for the "B" final.

Semifinal 1
Held in Stuttgart, West Germany

Pos.	Nation	Points
1	Poland	100
2	West Germany	92
3	Hungary	77
4	Czechoslovakia	65
5	Belgium	63
6	Sweden	59
7	Norway	45
8	Spain	36

Semifinal 2
Held in Dublin, Ireland

Pos.	Nation	Points
1	East Germany	114
2	Great Britain	106
3	Bulgaria	91
4	Netherlands	63
5	Austria	55
6	Ireland	48
7	Denmark	46
8	Iceland	21

Semifinal 3
Held in Bucharest, Romania

Pos.	Nation	Points
1	Soviet Union	106
2	Romania	99
3	Italy	84
4	France	77
5	Finland	65
6	Yugoslavia	46
7	Switzerland	42
8	Portugal	17

== Preliminaries ==
Preliminaries were held in Søllerød, Denmark, on 25 and 26 June for both men and women. First three teams advanced to the semifinals.

Men
Pos.	Nation	Points
1	Portugal	74
2	Ireland	65
3	Denmark	64
4	Iceland	54
5	Luxembourg	43

Women
Pos.	Nation	Points
1	Norway	49
2	Portugal	35
3	Iceland	34
4	Greece	31
