= 1978 European Athletics Championships – Men's 400 metres =

Men's 400 metres at the European Athletics Championships

The men's 400 metres at the 1978 European Athletics Championships was held in Prague, then Czechoslovakia, at Stadion Evžena Rošického on 30 and 31 August, and 1 September 1978.

== Medalists ==
Gold	Franz-Peter Hofmeister; West Germany
Silver	Karel Kolář; Czechoslovakia
Bronze	Francis Demarthon; France

== Results ==
1 September

Rank	Name	Nationality	Time	Notes
1st place, gold medalist(s)	Franz-Peter Hofmeister	West Germany	45.73	
2nd place, silver medalist(s)	Karel Kolář	Czechoslovakia	45.77	NR
3rd place, bronze medalist(s)	Francis Demarthon	France	45.97	
4	Lothar Krieg	West Germany	46.22	
5	Terry Whitehead	Great Britain	46.23	
6	Richard Ashton	Great Britain	46.34	
7	Bernd Herrmann	West Germany	46.69	
	Jerzy Pietrzyk	Poland	DNS	

=== Semi-finals ===
31 August

==== Semi-final 1 ====
Rank	Name	Nationality	Time	Notes
1	Jerzy Pietrzyk	Poland	46.27	Q
2	Karel Kolář	Czechoslovakia	46.28	Q
3	Lothar Krieg	West Germany	46.33	Q
4	Terry Whitehead	Great Britain	46.69	Q
5	Glen Cohen	Great Britain	46.91	
6	Eddy De Leeuw	Belgium	47.17	
7	Stefano Malinverni	Italy	47.18	
8	Maurice Volmar	France	47.50	

==== Semi-final 2 ====
Rank	Name	Nationality	Time	Notes
1	Bernd Herrmann	West Germany	46.09	Q
2	Franz-Peter Hofmeister	West Germany	46.18	Q
3	Francis Demarthon	France	46.26	Q
4	Richard Ashton	Great Britain	46.32	Q
5	Miroslav Tulis	Czechoslovakia	46.37	
6	Ryszard Podlas	Poland	46.59	
7	Viktor Burakov	Soviet Union	46.91	
8	Jens Hansen	Denmark	47.35	

=== Heats ===
30 August

==== Heat 1 ====
Rank	Name	Nationality	Time	Notes
1	Karel Kolář	Czechoslovakia	46.33	Q
2	Jerzy Pietrzyk	Poland	46.75	Q
3	Viktor Burakov	Soviet Union	47.18	Q
4	Željko Knapić	Yugoslavia	47.51	
5	Ornélien Gombault	France	47.91	
6	Mike Bayle	Luxembourg	48.71	
7	Alfons Brijdenbach	Belgium	53.05	

==== Heat 2 ====
Rank	Name	Nationality	Time	Notes
1	Franz-Peter Hofmeister	West Germany	46.28	Q
2	Richard Ashton	Great Britain	46.63	Q
3	Miroslav Tulis	Czechoslovakia	46.77	Q
4	Maurice Volmar	France	46.94	q
5	Eddy De Leeuw	Belgium	47.27	q
6	Koen Gijsbers	Netherlands	47.65	

==== Heat 3 ====
Rank	Name	Nationality	Time	Notes
1	Lothar Krieg	West Germany	46.57	Q
2	Francis Demarthon	France	46.73	Q
3	Glen Cohen	Great Britain	47.05	Q
4	Jens Hansen	Denmark	47.28	q
5	Rijk Van den Berghe	Belgium	47.55	
6	Ossi Karttunen	Finland	48.02	

==== Heat 4 ====
Rank	Name	Nationality	Time	Notes
1	Bernd Herrmann	West Germany	46.50	Q
2	Terry Whitehead	Great Britain	46.61	Q
3	Ryszard Podlas	Poland	46.81	Q
4	Stefano Malinverni	Italy	47.03	q
5	Markku Kukkoaho	Finland	47.33	
6	Frank Schaffer	East Germany	47.59	

== Participation ==
According to an unofficial count, 25 athletes from 14 countries participated in the event.

- Belgium (3)
- Czechoslovakia (2)
- Denmark (1)
- East Germany (1)
- Finland (2)
- France (3)
- Italy (1)
- Luxembourg (1)
- Netherlands (1)
- Poland (2)
- Soviet Union (1)
- Great Britain (3)
- West Germany (3)
- Yugoslavia (1)
