= 1977 European Athletics Indoor Championships – Men's 400 metres =

The men's 400 metres event at the 1977 European Athletics Indoor Championships was held on 12 and 13 March in San Sebastián.

== Medalists ==
| Gold | Silver | Bronze |
|---|---|---|
| Alfons Brijdenbach; Belgium | Francis Demarthon; France | Marian Gęsicki; Poland |

== Results ==
=== Heats ===
First 2 from each heat (Q) and the next 6 fastest (q) qualified for the semifinals.

| Rank | Heat | Name | Nationality | Time | Notes |
|---|---|---|---|---|---|
| 1 | 1 | Alfons Brijdenbach | Belgium | 48.18 | Q |
| 2 | 3 | Francis Demarthon | France | 48.24 | Q |
| 3 | 3 | Eddy De Leeuw | Belgium | 48.29 | Q |
| 4 | 2 | Hector Llatser | France | 48.30 | Q |
| 5 | 1 | Glen Cohen | Great Britain | 48.34 | Q |
| 6 | 3 | Ludger Zander | West Germany | 48.35 | q |
| 7 | 1 | Edward Antczak | Poland | 48.41 | q |
| 7 | 2 | Franz-Peter Hofmeister | West Germany | 48.41 | Q |
| 9 | 3 | Slavcho Kostov | Bulgaria | 48.46 | q |
| 10 | 2 | Marian Gęsicki | Poland | 48.48 | q |
| 11 | 1 | Luis Sarría | Spain | 48.61 | q |
| 12 | 1 | Flavio Borghi | Italy | 48.63 | q |
| 13 | 3 | Michael Frederiksson | Sweden | 48.86 | |
| 14 | 3 | Cezary Łapiński | Poland | 49.02 | |
| 15 | 2 | Jenaro Iritia | Spain | 49.20 | |
| 16 | 2 | Roberto Tozzi | Italy | 49.38 | |

=== Semifinals ===
First 2 from each heat (Q) and the next 2 fastest (q) qualified for the final.

| Rank | Heat | Name | Nationality | Time | Notes |
|---|---|---|---|---|---|
| 1 | 1 | Marian Gęsicki | Poland | 46.97 | Q |
| 2 | 1 | Glen Cohen | Great Britain | 47.07 | Q |
| 3 | 1 | Alfons Brijdenbach | Belgium | 47.64 | q |
| 4 | 2 | Edward Antczak | Poland | 47.67 | Q |
| 5 | 2 | Francis Demarthon | France | 47.76 | Q |
| 6 | 1 | Hector Llatser | France | 48.00 | q |
| 7 | 2 | Ludger Zander | West Germany | 48.13 | |
| 8 | 2 | Slavcho Kostov | Bulgaria | 48.20 | |
| 9 | 2 | Flavio Borghi | Italy | 48.60 | |
| 10 | 1 | Franz-Peter Hofmeister | West Germany | 48.68 | |
| 11 | 1 | Luis Sarría | Spain | 49.30 | |
| | 2 | Eddy De Leeuw | Belgium | DNS | |

=== Final ===
| Rank | Name | Nationality | Time | Notes |
|---|---|---|---|---|
| 1st place, gold medalist(s) | Alfons Brijdenbach | Belgium | 46.53 | NR |
| 2nd place, silver medalist(s) | Francis Demarthon | France | 47.11 | |
| 3rd place, bronze medalist(s) | Marian Gęsicki | Poland | 47.21 | |
| 4 | Hector Llatser | France | 47.47 | |
| 5 | Glen Cohen | Great Britain | 47.57 | |
| 6 | Edward Antczak | Poland | 47.82 | |
