= 1977 European Athletics Indoor Championships – Men's 800 metres =

The men's 800 metres event at the 1977 European Athletics Indoor Championships was held on 12 and 13 March in San Sebastián.

== Medalists ==
Gold	Silver	Bronze
Sebastian Coe; Great Britain	Erwin Gohlke; East Germany	Rolf Gysin; Switzerland

== Results ==
=== Heats ===
First 2 from each heat (Q) and the next 4 fastest (q) qualified for the semifinals.

Rank	Heat	Name	Nationality	Time	Notes
1	1	Antonio Páez	Spain	1:48.8	Q
2	2	Erwin Gohlke	East Germany	1:49.5	Q
3	2	Viktor Anokhin	Soviet Union	1:49.6	Q
4	1	Olaf Beyer	East Germany	1:49.7	Q
4	2	Günther Hasler	Liechtenstein	1:49.7	q
6	1	Carlo Grippo	Italy	1:49.9	q
7	1	Pavel Litovchenko	Soviet Union	1:50.4	q
8	1	Robert Hoofd	Belgium	1:50.4	q
9	2	Kees Ruyter	Netherlands	1:50.4	
10	4	Sebastian Coe	Great Britain	1:50.5	Q
11	3	Rainer Burmester	West Germany	1:50.7	Q
12	3	Rolf Gysin	Switzerland	1:50.7	Q
13	4	Feliks Wawrzon	Poland	1:50.8	Q
14	3	Milovan Savić	Yugoslavia	1:50.9	
14	4	Gabriele Ferrero	Italy	1:50.9	
14	4	Reinhard Aechtle	West Germany	1:50.9	
16	4	Arie Ruyter	Netherlands	1:52.0	
17	2	Eric Charron	France	1:52.5	
18	3	Stavros Mermingis	Greece	1:52.9	
19	4	Roger Milhau	France	1:54.8	
20	3	Jan Willem Boogman	Netherlands	2:02.2	
21	3	Markku Taskinen	Finland	2:31.6	

=== Semifinals ===
First 2 from each heat (Q) and the next 2 fastest (q) qualified for the final.

Rank	Heat	Name	Nationality	Time	Notes
1	2	Sebastian Coe	Great Britain	1:48.2	Q
2	2	Erwin Gohlke	East Germany	1:48.3	Q
3	2	Rolf Gysin	Switzerland	1:48.4	q
4	2	Viktor Anokhin	Soviet Union	1:48.7	q
5	2	Robert Hoofd	Belgium	1:49.5	
6	1	Günther Hasler	Liechtenstein	1:49.6	Q
7	1	Antonio Páez	Spain	1:49.6	Q
8	1	Olaf Beyer	East Germany	1:49.6	
9	1	Pavel Litovchenko	Soviet Union	1:49.7	
10	1	Rainer Burmester	West Germany	1:50.0	
11	1	Feliks Wawrzon	Poland	1:53.1	
	2	Carlo Grippo	Italy	DNF	

=== Final ===
Rank	Name	Nationality	Time	Notes
1st place, gold medalist(s)	Sebastian Coe	Great Britain	1:46.54	
2nd place, silver medalist(s)	Erwin Gohlke	East Germany	1:47.2	
3rd place, bronze medalist(s)	Rolf Gysin	Switzerland	1:47.6	
4	Viktor Anokhin	Soviet Union	1:47.7	
5	Günther Hasler	Liechtenstein	1:48.0	
6	Antonio Páez	Spain	1:48.3	
