= Slovenská Kajňa =

- Municipality
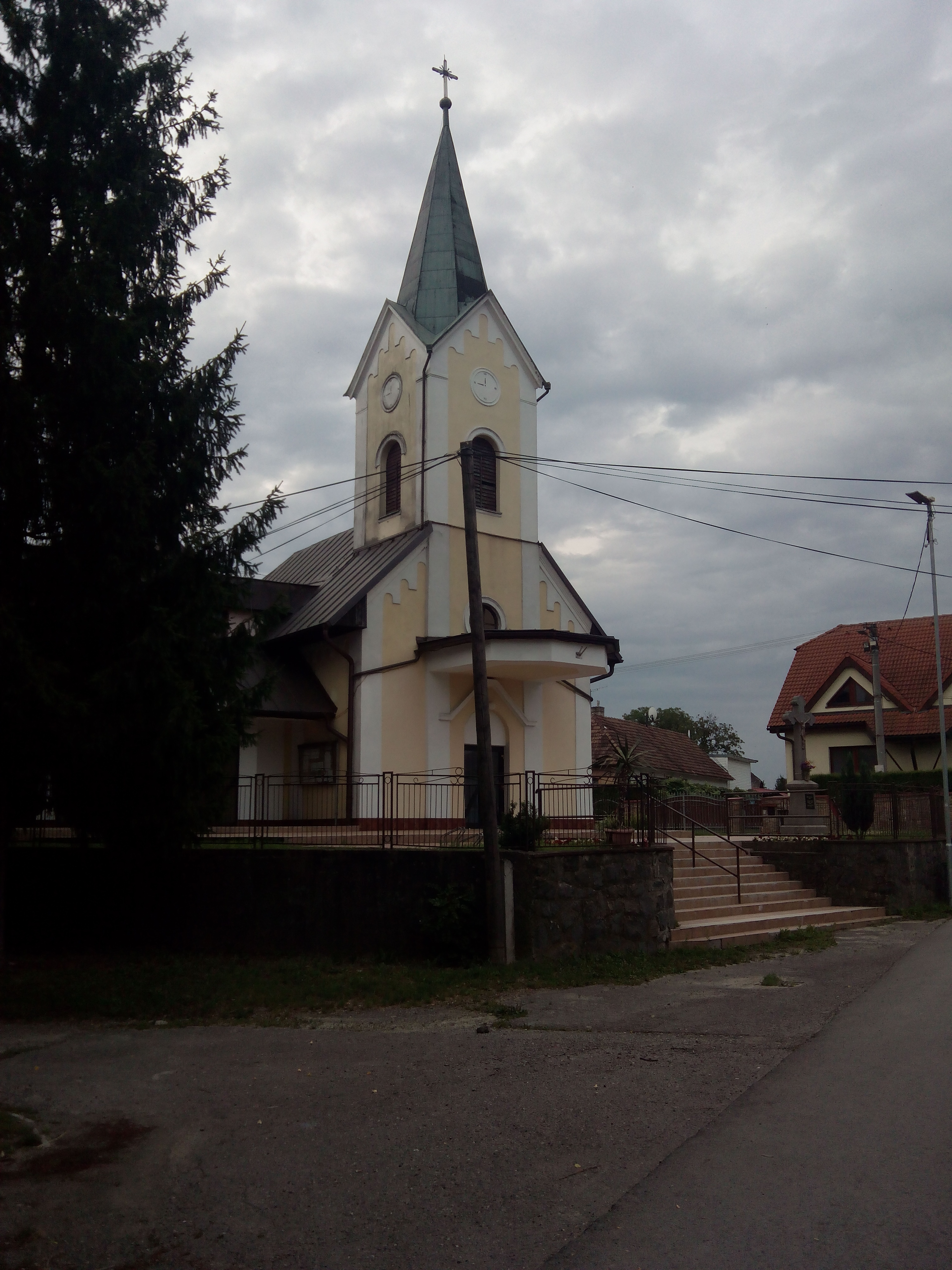

- Flag

- Location of Slovenská Kajňa in the Prešov Region Location of Slovenská Kajňa in Slovakia
- Coordinates: 48.97°N 21.75°E
- Country: Slovakia
- Region: Prešov Region
- District: Vranov nad Topľou District
- First mentioned: 1334

Government
  - Mayor: Marek Kačmár

Area
  - Total: 6.72 km^{2} (2.59 sq mi)
- Elevation: 140 m (460 ft)

Population (2025)
  - Total: 689
- Time zone: UTC+1 (CET)
  - Summer (DST): UTC+2 (CEST)
- Postal code: 940 2
- Area code: +421 57
- Vehicle registration plate (until 2022): VT
- Website: www.slovenskakajna.sk

Slovenská Kajňa (Hungarian: Alsónyírjes, until 1899: Tót-Kajnya) is a village and municipality in Vranov nad Topľou District in the Prešov Region of eastern Slovakia.

== History ==
In historical records the village was first mentioned in 1323.

== Geography ==
The municipality lies at an altitude of 140 metres (460 ft) and covers an area of 6.72 km^{2} (2.59 sq mi) (2025).

== Population ==
Population statistic (10 years)
Year	1995	2005	2015	2025
Count	820	816	784	689
Difference		−0.48%	−3.92%	−12.11%

Population statistic
Year	2024	2025
Count	701	689
Difference		−1.71%

It has a population of 689 people (31 December 2025).

=== Ethnicity ===
Census 2021 (1+ %)
Ethnicity	Number	Fraction
Slovak	680	93.53%
Not found out	40	5.5%
Total	727	

In year 2021 was 727 people by ethnicity 680 as Slovak, 40 as Not found out, 7 as Rusyn, 6 as Other, 4 as Czech, 4 as Austrian, 2 as Ukrainian, 1 as Russian and 1 as English.

Note on population: The difference values of population numbers in the table "Population statistic" and in the sections "Ethnicity" & "Religion" is caused by the use of various statistical methods.

=== Religion ===
Census 2021 (1+ %)
Religion	Number	Fraction
Roman Catholic Church	600	82.53%
Not found out	42	5.78%
Greek Catholic Church	38	5.23%
None	29	3.99%
Total	727	

In year 2021 was 727 people by religion 600 from Roman Catholic Church, 42 from Not found out, 38 from Greek Catholic Church, 29 from None, 4 from Other, 4 from Evangelical Church, 3 from Eastern Orthodox Church, 3 from Other and not ascertained christian church, 2 from Islam and 2 from Ad hoc movements.

== Notable people ==
- Marcel Matanin is a former long-distance runner, who represented his native country in the men's marathon at the 2004 Summer Olympics in Athens, Greece. There he finished in 81st and last place, clocking a total time of 2:50:26 hours. On 23 April 2006 Matanin won the Leipzig Marathon in 2:19:33 hours. Matanin was a former mayor of Slovenská Kajňa (from 1 January 2007 to 31 December 2010). Currently he is a sporting director of the ČSOB Bratislava Marathon.
- Tomáš Oslovič is a Slovak football defender who currently plays for Landesliga Bayern-Mitte club 1. FC Bad Kötzting in Germany. His former clubs were MFK Vranov nad Topľou, Czech 1. FC Karlovy Vary and German clubs SV Schwarzhofen e.V, SV Mitterteich.
