= Benny Brown =

American track and field athlete

Personal information
- Full name: Benjamin Gene Brown
- Nationality: American
- Born: September 27, 1953 San Francisco, California, U.S.
- Died: February 1, 1996 (aged 42) Ontario, California, U.S.

Sport
- Sport: Running
- College team: UCLA
Medal record
Men's athletics
Representing the United States
Olympic Games
Gold medal – first place	1976 Montreal	4 × 400 m relay

Benjamin Gene Brown (September 27, 1953 – February 1, 1996) was an Olympic gold-medal winner in the 1976 4 × 400 Men's Relay running the second leg. He teamed with Herman Frazier, Fred Newhouse and Maxie Parks.

Previously he had finished in 6th place at 440 yards in a very tight finish at the 1971 CIF California State Meet while running for the now closed Sunnyvale High School (California). Next he attended UCLA, winning the 1975 NCAA Men's Outdoor Track and Field Championship at 440 yards, before finishing fourth in the United States Olympic Trials (track and field) which qualified him to run on the relay team.

In 1979 Brown competed for the Athletes In Action under coach Maxie Parks winning the Meet of Champions.

June 1992 Benny Brown at age 38, competed in the Masters So Cal Track and Field Championship winning the M35 100 & 200 meter dash.

He died in an automobile accident at the age of 42. He had continued to be an active participant in the U. S. Corporate Games while working for Hughes Aircraft Company.

He was a part-time coach for Cal State Fullerton's track team.
