= Maxie Parks =

American sprinter

Maxwell Lander "Maxie" Parks
Personal information
- Nationality: American
- Born: July 9, 1951 (age 75) Arkansas City, Arkansas
- Height: 6 ft 2 in (188 cm)
- Weight: 172 lb (78 kg)

Sport
- Sport: Running
- College team: University of California Los Angeles

Achievements and titles
- Personal best: 400 m: 44.82

Maxie Parks
Medal record

Men's athletics

Representing the United States

Olympic Games
Gold medal – first place	1976 Montreal	4 × 400 m relay

Maxwell Lander ("Maxie") Parks (born July 9, 1951) is an American former athlete from Fresno, California.

Winner of the USA Olympic Trials in 1976, he did not gain a medal in the individual event (he came in fifth), but did become a winner of a gold medal in 4 × 400 m Men's relay race with Herman Frazier, Benny Brown, and Fred Newhouse at the 1976 Montreal Olympic Games. In the 1970s he competed for UCLA for several years. In 1977 he ran on the 1977 IAAF Athletics World Cup, anchoring the 4 × 400 m relay team to what appeared to be a runaway victory when he collapsed on the track with a severely pulled hamstring 150 m from the finish. This unfortunate injury denied the USA a seemingly certain victory in the team competition, the victory instead going to East Germany. Parks did not compete again that season, but did return in 1978 to again capture the national title at 400 m.

Any hope of Olympic success in 1980 was denied by the USA boycott of those games, but in any event Parks's form meant he only reached the semi-final stage at the Olympic trials.

Prior to UCLA he was a graduate of Washington Union High School, then Fresno City College.

In 1979 Parks coached for the Athletes in Action.

Parks was in 2010 honoured as a member of the '100 Stars for 100 Years' for Fresno City College. In the publicity for the event, Parks is stated as having received the honour of being, in 1990, inducted into the Fresno Athletic Hall of Fame. Parks has also been elected into the California Community College Track and Field Hall of Fame.

His grandson Cedric Coward plays for the NBA's Memphis Grizzlies.

== Rankings ==
Parks was ranked among the best in the US and the world in the 400 m/440 y events over the period 1973 to 1978, according to the votes of the experts of Track and Field News.

100 meters
Year	World rank	US rank
1973	-	5th
1974	-	6th
1975	-	-
1976	5th	3rd
1977	4th	2nd
1978	4th	3rd

== USA Championships ==
Parks was a very successful competitor in the US National Championships between 1973 and 1978:

USA Championships
Year	100 m
1973	4th
1974	-
1975	-
1976	1st
1977	3rd
1978	1st

== Best performances ==
Notes for tables:

1. world rankings are based on the best time for each athlete.
2. 440 yard times are converted to 400 metres times by subtracting 0.3 s for manual-timed results.
3. for comparison with automatically timed races, manual times have a factor of 0.14 s added.

400 meters
Year	Result	World Rank	Location	Date
1973	45.5	9th	Bakersfield	Jun 16
1974	45.76	11th	Austin	Aug 24
1975	45.9	30th	Bakersfield	May 17
1976	44.82	4th	Westwood	Jun 12
1977	45.45	7th	Zurich	Aug 24
1978	45.15	6th	Westwood	Jun 10
