= 1978 European Athletics Indoor Championships – Men's 800 metres =

The men's 800 metres event at the 1978 European Athletics Indoor Championships was held on 11 and 12 March in Milan.

== Medalists ==
Gold	Silver	Bronze
Markku Taskinen; Finland	Olaf Beyer; East Germany	Roger Milhau; France

== Results ==
=== Heats ===
First 2 from each heat (Q) qualified directly for the final.

Rank	Heat	Name	Nationality	Time	Notes
1	1	Roger Milhau	France	1:48.6	Q
2	1	Marian Gęsicki	Poland	1:48.9	Q
3	1	Arno Korneling	Netherlands	1:49.2	
4	1	Pavel Litovchenko	Soviet Union	1:50.9	
5	3	Olaf Beyer	East Germany	1:51.0	Q
6	3	Rolf Gysin	Switzerland	1:51.2	Q
7	3	Sermet Timurlenk	Turkey	1:51.6	
8	3	Paweł Szweda	Poland	1:52.1	
9	1	Jón Didriksson	Iceland	1:53.7	
10	2	Gabriele Ferrero	Italy	1:56.0	Q
11	2	Markku Taskinen	Finland	1:56.1	Q
12	2	Günther Hasler	Liechtenstein	1:56.3	
13	2	Milovan Savić	Yugoslavia	1:56.4	

=== Final ===
Rank	Name	Nationality	Time	Notes
1st place, gold medalist(s)	Markku Taskinen	Finland	1:47.36	NR
2nd place, silver medalist(s)	Olaf Beyer	East Germany	1:47.68	
3rd place, bronze medalist(s)	Roger Milhau	France	1:47.8	
4	Marian Gęsicki	Poland	1:48.1	
5	Rolf Gysin	Switzerland	1:49.3	
6	Gabriele Ferrero	Italy	1:49.5	
