= 1977 European Athletics Indoor Championships – Men's 3000 metres =

The men's 3000 metres event at the 1977 European Athletics Indoor Championships was held on 12 and 13 March in San Sebastián.

== Medalists ==
Gold	Silver	Bronze
Karl Fleschen; West Germany	Pekka Päivärinta; Finland	Markus Ryffel; Switzerland

== Results ==
=== Heats ===
First 3 from each heat (Q) and the next 2 fastest (q) qualified for the final.

Rank	Heat	Name	Nationality	Time	Notes
1	1	Karl Fleschen	West Germany	7:57.8	Q
2	1	Pekka Päivärinta	Finland	7:57.9	Q
3	1	Markus Ryffel	Switzerland	7:58.4	Q
4	1	Paul Thijs	Belgium	7:59.1	q
5	1	Štefan Polák	Czechoslovakia	7:59.2	q
6	2	Fernando Cerrada	Spain	7:59.5	Q
7	1	Christian Sanjurjo	Spain	7:59.7	
8	2	Michael Karst	West Germany	8:02.4	Q
9	2	Ray Smedley	Great Britain	8:02.4	Q
10	2	Leopold Tomaszewicz	Poland	8:07.9	
11	2	Alexandre Gonzalez	France	8:10.7	
12	1	Mehmet Tümkan	Turkey	8:14.0	
13	2	Klaas Lok	Netherlands	8:17.6	

=== Final ===
Rank	Name	Nationality	Time	Notes
1st place, gold medalist(s)	Karl Fleschen	West Germany	7:57.5	
2nd place, silver medalist(s)	Pekka Päivärinta	Finland	7:59.3	
3rd place, bronze medalist(s)	Markus Ryffel	Switzerland	8:00.3	
4	Fernando Cerrada	Spain	8:00.6	
5	Michael Karst	West Germany	8:03.2	
6	Ray Smedley	Great Britain	8:06.2	
7	Paul Thijs	Belgium	8:08.4	
8	Štefan Polák	Czechoslovakia	8:08.4	
