= Carl Clapp =

American college sports administrator

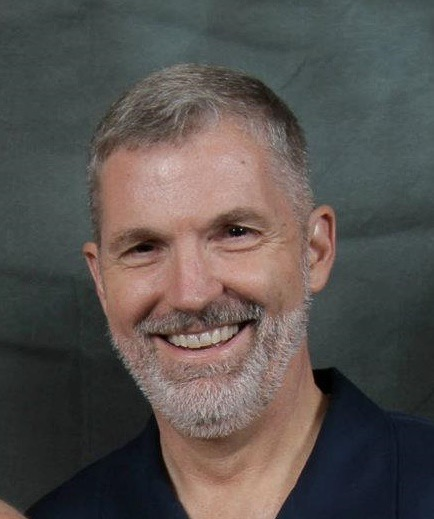

Biographical details
- Born: Santa Barbara, California, U.S.
- Education: UC Santa Barbara (1981); University of Arizona (1985)

Coaching career (HC unless noted)
- 1979–1981: Santa Barbara City (assistant)
- 1981–1982: Arizona (volunteer assistant)
- 1982–1984: Arizona State (GA)
- 1984–1986: Wichita State (assistant)
- 1988–1991: Emporia State (assistant)

Administrative career (AD unless noted)
- 1988–1992: Emporia State (assistant AD)
- 1992–1995: Avila
- 1995–2000: Redlands
- 2000–2006: Saint Mary's
- 2006–2021: Hawaii (associate AD)
- 2008: → Hawaii (interim AD)

Carl Clapp (born November 2, 1958) is an American retired college sports administrator who was most recently the associate athletics director for administrative services at the University of Hawaii at Manoa. Prior to working at Hawaii, Clapp was the athletic director at Saint Mary's College of California. Before that, he was previously the athletic director at the University of Redlands and Avila University. He also served as the interim athletics director at Hawaii in 2008 following the termination of Herman Frazier. His first task as interim AD was to find a new football coach after June Jones left to accept the head coaching position at SMU and was part of the selection committee that hired Greg McMackin. Clapp also played a crucial role in securing a partnership between Hawaii and sports apparel brand Under Armour.

Clapp was rumored to be a candidate for the open athletics director at his alma mater UC Santa Barbara after the retirement of Gary Cunningham. He applied for the open athletic director position at the University of Montana in 2012 and was one of four finalists, but the job ultimately went to Kent Haslam.
