= 1978 European Athletics Indoor Championships – Men's 3000 metres =

The men's 3000 metres event at the 1978 European Athletics Indoor Championships was held on 12 March in Milan.

== Results ==
Rank	Name	Nationality	Time	Notes
1st place, gold medalist(s)	Markus Ryffel	Switzerland	7:49.5	
2nd place, silver medalist(s)	Emiel Puttemans	Belgium	7:49.9	
3rd place, bronze medalist(s)	Jörg Peter	East Germany	7:50.1	
4	Dan Glans	Sweden	7:51.2	
5	Klaas Lok	Netherlands	7:51.4	
6	Karl Fleschen	West Germany	7:53.9	
7	Paul Thijs	Belgium	7:55.7	
8	Venanzio Ortis	Italy	7:55.8	
9	Józef Ziubrak	Poland	7:56.2	
10	Dietmar Millonig	Austria	7:57.5	
11	Christian Sanjurjo	Spain	7:58.1	
12	Patriz Ilg	West Germany	7:58.8	
13	Ari Paunonen	Finland	8:07.3	
14	Ingo Sensburg	West Germany	8:12.5	
