= Kiptum =

Kiptum, sometimes Kitum, is a surname of Kenyan origin meaning "someone born during a ceremony." Among the Nandi community, "Tum" is defined as a ceremony, therefore 'Kiptum' is a male name for someone born during a ceremony while 'Cheptum' is a female name for the same.

People with this name, 'Kiptum', 'Kitum', 'Cheptum', include:

- Kelvin Kiptum (1999–2024), Kenyan marathon runner and world record holder
- Fred Kiprop Kiptum (born 1974), Kenyan marathon runner and 1999 Amsterdam Marathon winner
- Jeruto Kiptum (born 1981), Kenyan steeplechase runner and 2005 World Championships medallist
- Julius Kiptum Rop (born 1977), Kenyan marathon runner
- Timothy Kitum (born 1994), Kenyan middle-distance runner and 2012 Olympic medallist
