= 1974 European Athletics Indoor Championships – Men's 400 metres =

The men's 400 metres event at the 1974 European Athletics Indoor Championships was held on 9 and 10 March in Gothenburg.

== Medalists ==
Gold	Silver	Bronze
Alfons Brijdenbach; Belgium	Andreas Scheibe; East Germany	Günther Arnold; East Germany

== Results ==
=== Heats ===
Held on 9 March.
First 2 from each heat (Q) qualified directly for the final.

Rank	Heat	Name	Nationality	Time	Notes
1	1	Alfons Brijdenbach	Belgium	46.85	Q
2	2	Günther Arnold	East Germany	47.15	Q, NR
3	2	Francis Demarthon	France	47.36	Q
4	1	Andreas Scheibe	East Germany	47.41	Q, NR
5	2	Michael Fredriksson	Sweden	47.64	
6	1	Falko Geiger	West Germany	47.88	
7	1	Kyriakos Onissiforou	Greece	48.73	

=== Final ===
Held on 10 March.

Rank	Name	Nationality	Time	Notes
1st place, gold medalist(s)	Alfons Brijdenbach	Belgium	46.60	
2nd place, silver medalist(s)	Andreas Scheibe	East Germany	46.80	NR
3rd place, bronze medalist(s)	Günther Arnold	East Germany	46.94	
4	Francis Demarthon	France	47.08	
