= Horace Tuitt =

Trinidad and Tobago sprinter

Personal information
- Nationality: Trinidad and Tobago
- Born: 25 January 1954 (age 72)

Sport
- Sport: Sprinting
- Event: 4 × 400 metres relay

Horace Clyde Tuitt (born 25 January 1954) is a Trinidad and Tobago sprinter. He competed in the men's 4 × 400 metres relay at the 1976 Summer Olympics.

Running for the Florida Gators track and field team, Tuitt won the 1975 4 × 440 yard relay at the NCAA Division I Indoor Track and Field Championships.
