= Victor Gooding =

Barbadian sprinter

Personal information
- Nationality: Barbadian
- Born: 13 November 1949 (age 76)

Sport
- Sport: Sprinting
- Event: 4 × 400 metres relay

Victor Gooding (born 13 November 1949) is a Barbadian sprinter. He competed in the men's 4 × 400 metres relay at the 1976 Summer Olympics.
