= Julius Kiptum Rop =

Kenyan long-distance runner

Julius Kiptum Rop (born 1977) is a long-distance runner from Kenya. On a windy April 17, 2005, Rop made his marathon debut in Germany, at the Leipzig Marathon, with a 2:16:22 win. Poland's Artur Blasinki finished a distant second in 2:19:24, Wilson Kipngetich (Kenya) third in 2:19:36.

== Achievements ==
Year	Competition	Venue	Position	Event	Notes
Representing Kenya
2005	Leipzig Marathon	Leipzig, Germany	1st	Marathon	2:16:22

Sporting positions
Preceded by Christopher Cheboiboch	Men's Leipzig Marathon winner 2005	Succeeded by Marcel Matanin
