= Hugues Roger =

French sprinter

Personal information
- Nationality: French
- Born: 20 October 1940 (age 85)

Sport
- Sport: Sprinting
- Event: 4 × 400 metres relay

Hugues Roger (born 20 October 1940) is a French sprinter. He competed in the men's 4 × 400 metres relay at the 1976 Summer Olympics.
