= Harcourt Wason =

Barbadian sprinter (born 1956)

Personal information
- Nationality: Barbadian
- Born: 14 April 1956 (age 70)

Sport
- Sport: Sprinting
- Event: 4 × 400 metres relay

Harcourt Wason (born 14 April 1956) is a Barbadian sprinter. He competed in the men's 4 × 400 metres relay at the 1976 Summer Olympics.

Wason competed for the Adelphi Panthers track and field team in the NCAA.
