= Hassan Masallam =

Saudi Arabian sprinter

Personal information
- Nationality: Saudi Arabian
- Born: 16 February 1960 (age 66)

Sport
- Sport: Sprinting
- Event: 4 × 400 metres relay

Hassan Masallam (born 16 February 1960) is a Saudi Arabian sprinter. He competed in the men's 4 × 400 metres relay at the 1976 Summer Olympics.
