= 1980 European Athletics Indoor Championships – Men's 3000 metres =

The men's 3000 metres event at the 1980 European Athletics Indoor Championships was held on 2 March in Sindelfingen.

== Results ==
Rank	Name	Nationality	Time	Notes
1st place, gold medalist(s)	Karl Fleschen	West Germany	7:57.5	
2nd place, silver medalist(s)	Klaas Lok	Netherlands	7:57.9	
3rd place, bronze medalist(s)	Hans-Jürgen Orthmann	West Germany	7:59.9	
4	Bernhard Gatzke	West Germany	8:07.8	
5	Marios Kassianidis	Cyprus	8:08.5	
6	Fulvio Costa	Italy	8:20.8	
