= Markus Ryffel =

Swiss long-distance runner

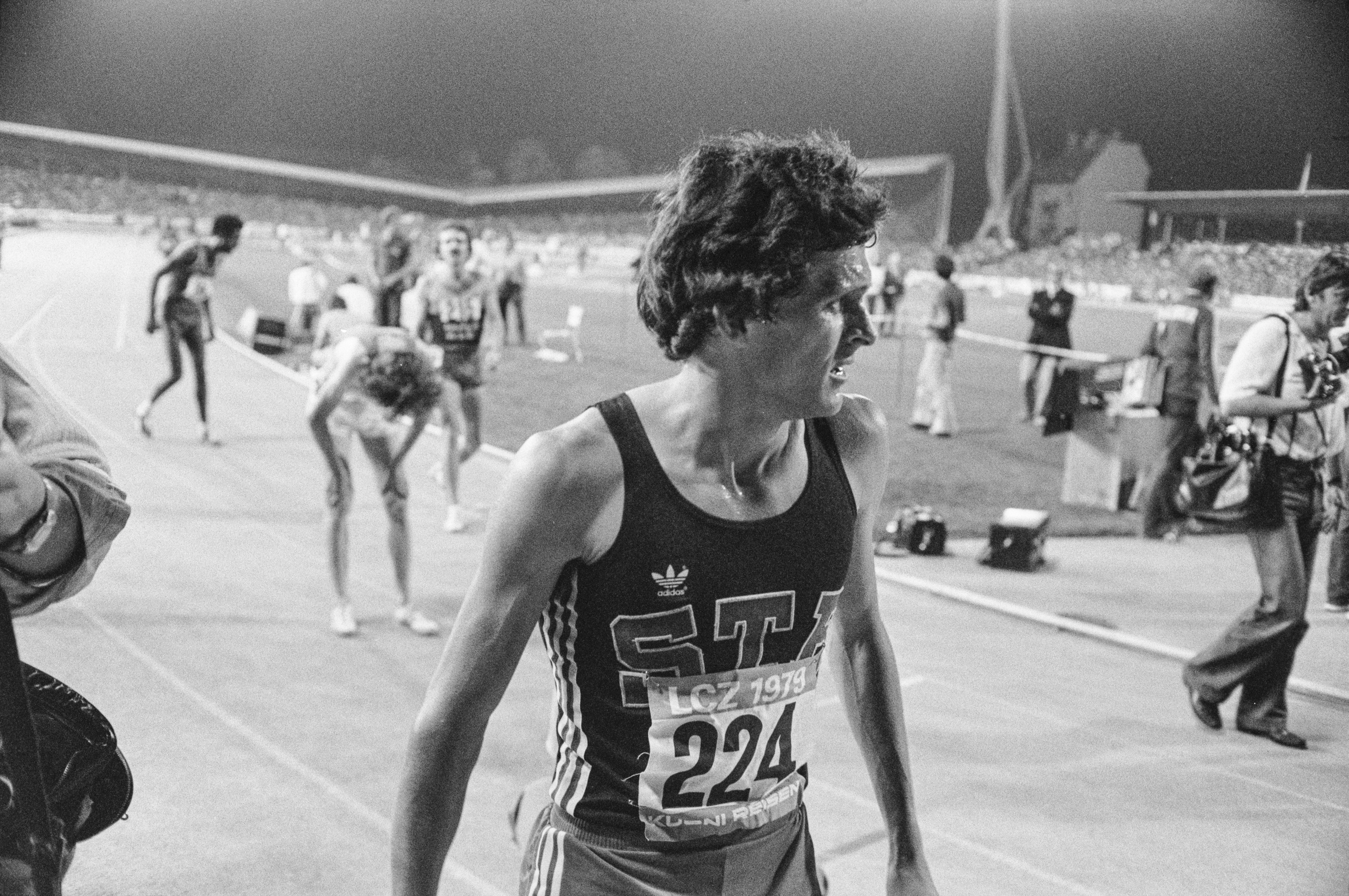

Medal record

Men's athletics

Representing Switzerland

Olympic Games
| Silver medal – second place | 1984 Los Angeles | 5000 m |

European Championships
| Silver medal – second place | 1978 Prague | 5000 m |

European Indoor Championships
| Gold medal – first place | 1978 Milan | 3000 m |
| Gold medal – first place | 1979 Vienna | 3000 m |
| Bronze medal – third place | 1977 San Sebastián | 3000 m |

Markus Ryffel (born 5 February 1955 in Bern) is a former long-distance runner from Switzerland who won the silver medal in the 5000 metres at the 1984 Summer Olympics in Los Angeles.

== Biography ==
He set the Swiss record at 13:07.54 min. He also won a silver medal at the 1978 European Championships in Athletics, sharing it with the Soviet Union's Alexander Fedotkin; they both lost just one-tenth of a second to Italy's Venanzio Ortis. Between these two major championships medals, Ryffel had a rather varying success as a 5,000-metre runner. In the 1980 Moscow Olympics, he placed fifth in that distance, losing to the winner, Ethiopia's Miruts Yifter, by 2.1 seconds. He ran significantly worse in the 1982 European Athletics Championships in Athens and in the 1983 World Athletics Championships in Helsinki, Finland, placing only tenth and twelfth, respectively. Ryffel's final few years as a competitive runner, after the Los Angeles Olympics, were also rather undistinguished. He placed third in a time of slightly over 14 minutes at 5,000 metres in the European Athletics Cup's B final in Budapest in 1985. In the 1986 European Athletics Championships, he dropped out of the 5,000-metre final. In his last major international championships, the 1987 World Athletics Championships, he placed well outside the top ten runners at 10,000 metres and was eliminated in the 5,000-metre qualifying heats.

== Personal Bests ==
1500m: 3:38.60 Mile: 3:58.05 2000m: 4:59.54 3000m: 7:41.00 5000m: 13:07.54 10000m: 27:54.29

Awards
| Preceded by (Switzerland) Michel Broillet | Swiss Sportsman of the Year; 1978 | Succeeded by (Switzerland) Peter Lüscher |
