= Athletics at the 1976 Summer Olympics – Men's 4 × 400 metres relay =

These are the official results of the men's 4 × 400 metres relay event at the 1976 Summer Olympics in Montreal, Quebec, Canada. The event was held on 30 and 31 July 1976. There were a total number of 16 nations competing.

== Medalists ==
| Gold | Silver | Bronze |
|---|---|---|
| United States; Herman Frazier; Benny Brown; Fred Newhouse; Maxie Parks | Poland; Ryszard Podlas; Jan Werner; Zbigniew Jaremski; Jerzy Pietrzyk | West Germany; Franz-Peter Hofmeister; Lothar Krieg; Harald Schmid; Bernd Herrmann |

== Records ==
These were the standing World and Olympic records (in seconds) prior to the 1976 Summer Olympics.

| World record | 2:56.16 | (United States) Vincent Matthews (United States) Ron Freeman (United States) Larry James (United States) Lee Evans | Mexico City (MEX) | October 20, 1968 |
| Olympic record | 2:56.16 | (United States) Vincent Matthews (United States) Ron Freeman (United States) Larry James (United States) Lee Evans | Mexico City (MEX) | October 20, 1968 |

== Results ==
=== Final ===
- Held on 31 July 1976. The final was run in a hard rain.

| RANK | NATION | ATHLETES | TIME |
|---|---|---|---|
| Gold medal | United States | • Herman Frazier • Benny Brown • Fred Newhouse • Maxie Parks | 2:58.65 |
| Silver medal | Poland | • Ryszard Podlas • Jan Werner • Zbigniew Jaremski • Jerzy Pietrzyk | 3:01.43 |
| Bronze medal | West Germany | • Franz-Peter Hofmeister • Lothar Krieg • Harald Schmid • Bernd Herrmann | 3:01.98 |
| 4. | Canada | • Ian Seale • Don Domansky • Leighton Hope • Brian Saunders | 3:02.64 |
| 5. | Jamaica | • Leighton Priestley • Donald Quarrie • Colin Bradford • Seymour Newman | 3:02.84 |
| 6. | Trinidad and Tobago | • Michael Solomon • Horace Tuitt • Joseph Coombs • Charles Joseph | 3:03.46 |
| 7. | Cuba | • Eddy Gutierrez • Damaso Alfonso • Carlos Alvarez • Alberto Juantorena | 3:03.81 |
| 8. | Finland | • Hannu Mäkelä • Ossi Karttunen • Stig Lönnqvist • Markku Kukkoaho | 3:06.51 |

=== Semifinals ===
- Held on 30 July 1976

==== Heat 1 ====
| RANK | NATION | ATHLETES | TIME |
|---|---|---|---|
| 1. | United States | • Herman Frazier • Benny Brown • Fred Newhouse • Maxie Parks | 2:59.52 |
| 2. | West Germany | • Franz-Peter Hofmeister • Lothar Krieg • Harald Schmid • Bernd Herrmann | 3:03.24 |
| 3. | Jamaica | • Leighton Priestley • Donald Quarrie • Colin Bradford • Seymour Newman | 3:03.86 |
| 4. | Canada | • Ian Seale • Don Domansky • Leighton Hope • Brian Saunders | 3:03.89 |
| 5. | Finland | • Hannu Mäkelä • Ossi Karttunen • Stig Lönnqvist • Markku Kukkoaho | 3:05.02 |
| 6. | Puerto Rico | • Pedro Ferrer • Ivan Mangual • Julio Ferrer • Jorge Ortíz | 3:06.08 |
| 7. | Saudi Arabia | • Kamil Al-Abbasi • Hamed Ali • Ahmed Asiry • Hassan Masallam | 3:17.53 |
| — | Great Britain | • Ainsley Bennett • Glen Cohen • David Jenkins • Alan Pascoe | DNF |

==== Heat 2 ====
| RANK | NATION | ATHLETES | TIME |
|---|---|---|---|
| 1. | Poland | • Ryszard Podlas • Jan Werner • Zbigniew Jaremski • Jerzy Pietrzyk | 3:03.03 |
| 2. | Trinidad and Tobago | • Michael Solomon • Horace Tuitt • Joseph Coombs • Charles Joseph | 3:03.54 |
| 3. | Cuba | • Eddy Gutierrez • Dámaso Alfonso • Carlos Álvarez • Alberto Juantorena | 3:05.19 |
| 4. | France | • Hugues Roger • Roger Velasquez • Francis Kerbiriou • Hector Llatser | 3:05.48 |
| 5. | Australia | • Max Binnington • Peter Grant • Don Hanly • Rick Mitchell | 3:05.75 |
| 6. | Soviet Union | • Dmitriy Stukalov • Vladimir Ponomaryov • Viktor Anokhin • Yevgeniy Gavrilenko | 3:07.72 |
| 7. | Barbados | • Victor Gooding • Harcourt Wason • Hamil Grimes • Orlando Greene | 3:08.13 |
| 8. | Antigua and Barbuda | • Cuthbert Jacobs • Paul Richards • Elroy Turner • Fred Sowerby | 3:09.66 |
