= Leighton Hope =

Canadian sprinter

Personal information
- Nationality: Canadian
- Born: 4 November 1952 (age 72) Kingston, Jamaica

Sport
- Sport: Sprinting
- Event: 4 × 400 metres relay

Leighton Hope (born 4 November 1952) is a Canadian sprinter. He competed in the men's 4 × 400 metres relay at the 1976 Summer Olympics.
