= Ian Seale =

Canadian sprinter

Personal information
- Born: 19 September 1954 (age 71) Toronto, Ontario, Canada

Sport
- Sport: Sprinting
- Event: 4 × 400 metres relay

Ian Seale (born 19 September 1954) is a Canadian sprinter. He competed in the men's 4 × 400 metres relay at the 1976 Summer Olympics.

Seale competed for the Texas Longhorns track and field team in the NCAA.
