= Eddy De Leeuw =

Belgian sprinter

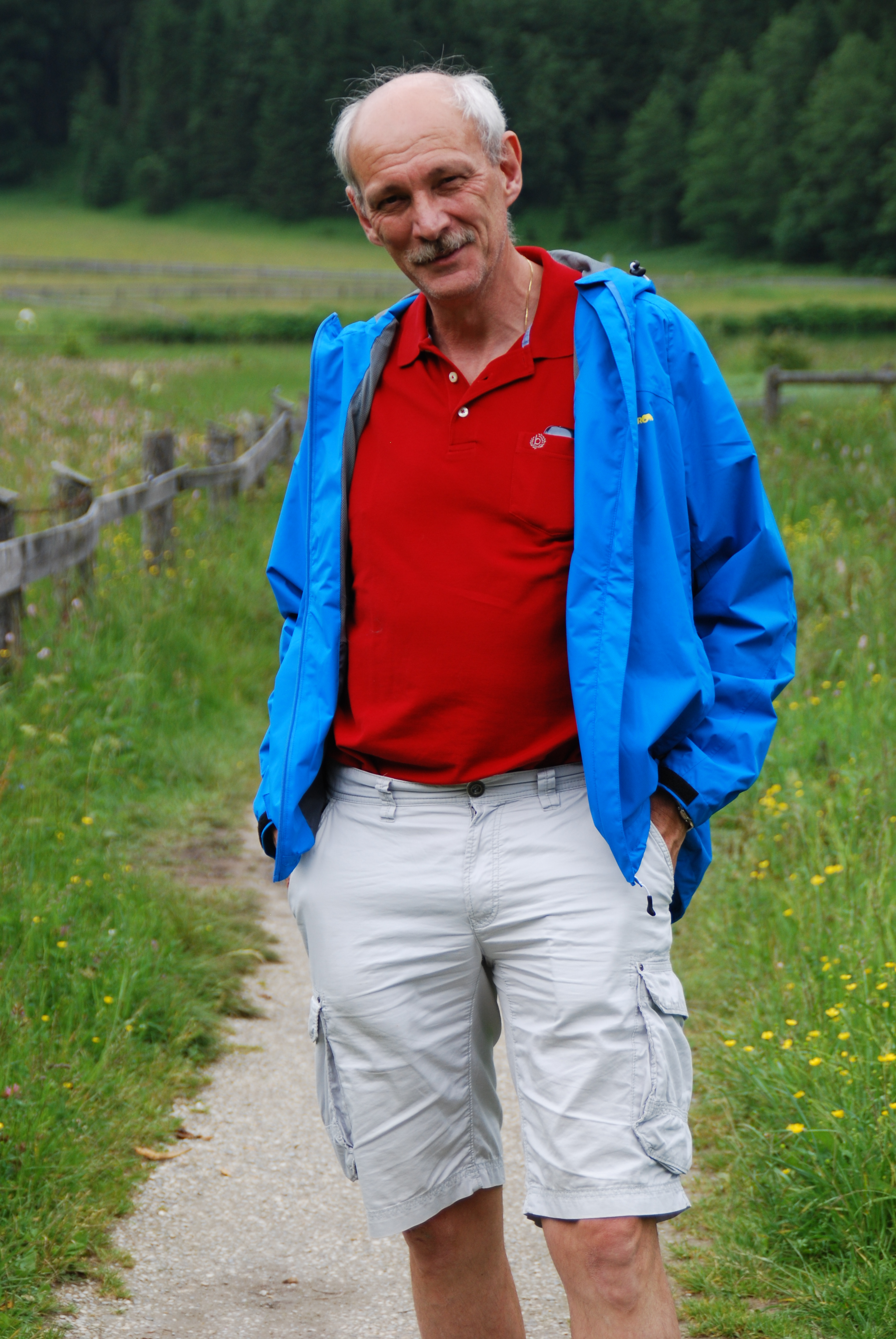

Personal information
- Nationality: Belgian
- Born: 16 June 1956
- Died: 26 November 2015 (aged 59) Asse, Belgium

Sport
- Sport: Sprinting
- Event: 400 metres

Eddy De Leeuw (16 June 1956 – 26 November 2015) was a Belgian sprinter specializing in the 400 metres. He competed in the men's 400 metres at the 1980 Summer Olympics.

De Leeuw was a 1978 European Athletics Championships semi-finalist. De Leeuw was a member of the Belgian 4 x 400 metres team of Danny Roelandt, Rik Vandenberghe and Fons Brydenbach, setting the Belgian national record three times and competing at the 1980 Olympics. He won two Belgian Athletics Championships national titles, in 1980 and 1983.
