= Marcel Matanin =

Slovak long-distance runner

Marcel Matanin (born December 15, 1973, in Vranov nad Topľou) is a long-distance runner from Slovakia, who represented his native country in the men's marathon at the 2004 Summer Olympics in Athens, Greece. There he finished in 81st and last place, clocking a total time of 2:50:26 hours. On April 23, 2006, Matanin won the Leipzig Marathon in 2:19:33 hours. His P.R. is 2:17:23 run in the Zurich Marathon which earning him his qualifying time for the Olympic Games.

== Achievements ==
- All results regarding marathon, unless stated otherwise

Year	Competition	Venue	Position	Notes
Representing Slovakia
2004	Olympic Games	Athens, Greece	81st	2:50:26
2006	Leipzig Marathon	Leipzig, Germany	1st	2:19:33
2007	Leipzig Marathon	Leipzig, Germany	1st	2:26:21

Sporting positions
Preceded by Julius Kiptum Rop	Men's Leipzig Marathon winner 2006–2007	Succeeded by Jörg Matthé
