= Vesela Yatsinska =

Bulgarian middle-distance runner

Personal information
- Born: 16 January 1951 (age 75) Botevgrad, Bulgaria

Sport
- Sport: Track and field
Medal record
Representing Bulgaria
European Indoor Championships
Silver medal – second place	1977 San Sebastián	1500 metres

Vesela Yatsinska (Bulgarian: Весела Яцинска, née Tasheva (Bulgarian: Ташева, born 16 January 1951) is a retired Bulgarian middle-distance runner who specialized in the 800 and 1500 metres.

She was born in Botevgrad, and represented the club Balkan Botevgrad. She finished eighth at the 1976 European Indoor Championships, won the silver medal at the 1977 European Indoor Championships, finished fourth at the 1978 European Indoor Championships and fourth again at the 1982 European Indoor Championships

She competed for the first time at the Olympics in 1976, only in the 1500 metres. She finished third in the first heat, but was knocked out in the semi-finals with a sixth place and a time of 4:07.89 minutes. At the 1980 Summer Olympics she did not progress past round one in the 1500 metres, despite achieving a personal best time of 4.04.70 minutes. She also competed in the 800 metres and reached the semi-final there. She ran almost identical in her two rounds: 1:59.83 in the heat and 1:59.84 in the semi-final. She later finished seventh in the 1500 metres at the 1982 European Championships.

She became Bulgarian 800 metres champion in 1980, 1500 metres champion in 1976 and 1982 and 3000 metres champion in 1979 and 1981. She also became Bulgarian indoor champion in the 800 metres in 1970, 1971, 1972 and 1982.

She had personal bests of 1:58.9 minutes in the 800 metres, achieved in July 1979 in Paris; 2:35.65 minutes in the 1000 metres, achieved in August 1982 in Sofia; 4:21.52 minutes in the mile run, achieved in June 1982 in Budapest; and 8:52.89 minutes in the 3000 metres, achieved in August 1979 in Turin.
