= Rolf Gysin =

Swiss long-distance runner

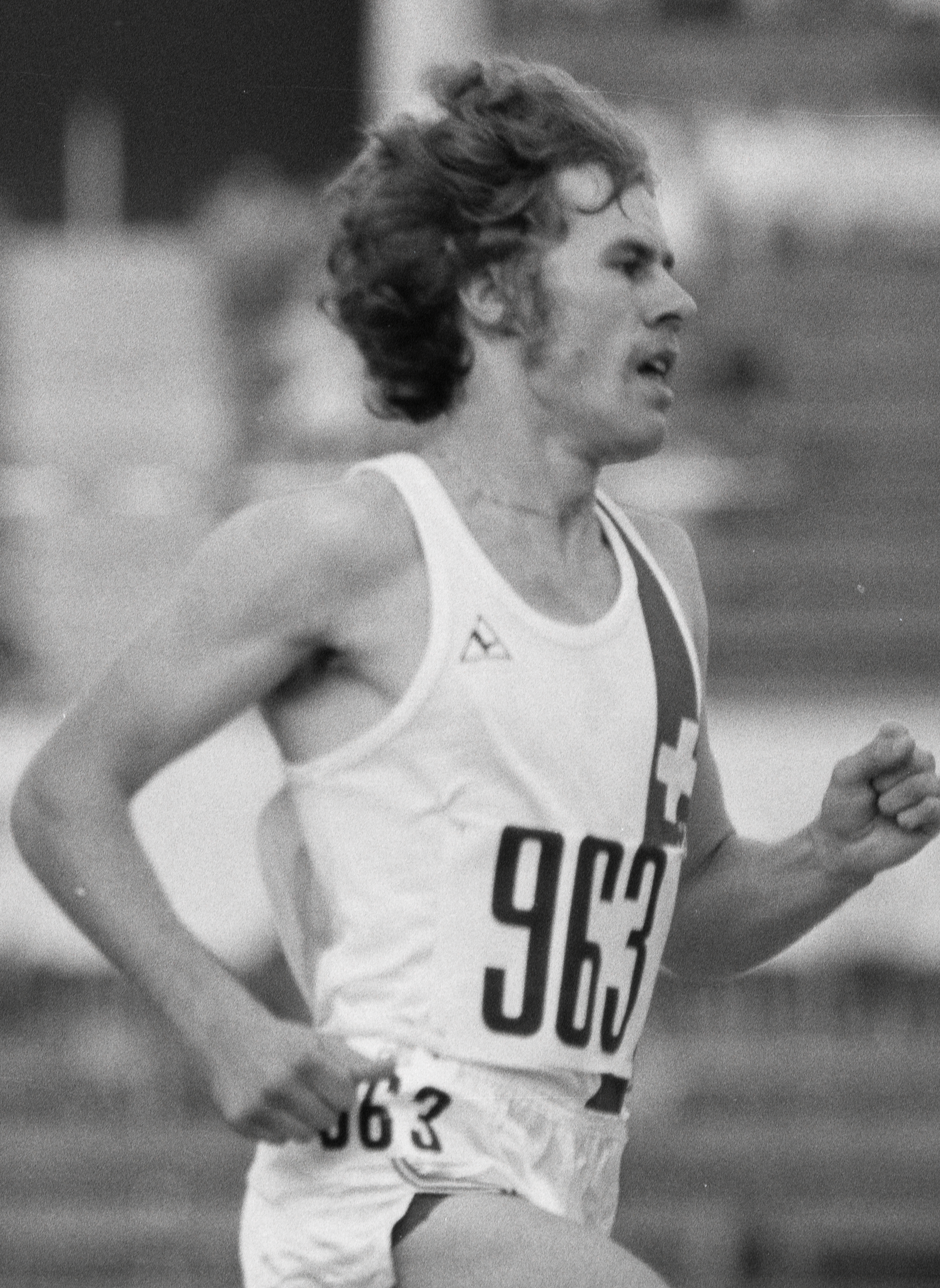
- Gysin in 1974

Personal information
- Nationality: Swiss
- Born: 29 January 1952 (age 74)
- Height: 180 cm (5 ft 11 in)
- Weight: 62 kg (137 lb)

Sport
- Country: Switzerland
- Sport: Middle-distance running

Achievements and titles
- Personal bests: 800 – 1:45.97 (1975); 1500 – 3:37.7 (1973)
Medal record
Men's athletics
Representing Switzerland
European Indoor Championships
Bronze medal – third place	1977 San Sebastián	800 m

Rolf Gysin is a Swiss Olympic middle-distance runner. He represented his country in the men's 1500 meters and 800 meters at the 1976 Summer Olympics and 800 meters at the 1972 Summer Olympics. His personal best was a 1:45.97 in 800 meters and a 3:37.7 in 1500 meters.
