= Christopher Cheboiboch =

Kenyan long-distance runner

Christopher Cheboiboch (born 3 March 1977) is a Kenyan long-distance runner who competes in the marathon. He has won the Leipzig Marathon and the San Diego Marathon and was the runner-up at the 2002 New York City Marathon. He represented his country at the 2003 World Championships in Athletics, but did not finish the marathon race.

== Achievements ==
Year	Competition	Venue	Position	Event	Notes
Representing Kenya
2001	World Half Marathon Championships	Bristol, England	8th	Half marathon	1:01:14
2001	World Half Marathon Championships	Bristol, England	2nd	Team	
2002	New York City Marathon	New York, United States	2nd	Marathon	2:08:17
2003	World Championships	Paris, France	—	Marathon	DNF
2004	City-Pier-City Loop	The Hague, Netherlands	1st	Half Marathon	1:02:41
2004	Leipzig Marathon	Leipzig, Germany	1st	Marathon	2:10:16
2005	Rock 'n' Roll San Diego Marathon	San Diego, United States	1st	Marathon	2:09:17

=== Marathons ===
- 2001 Nashville Marathon - 1st
- 2002 Boston Marathon - 2nd
- 2002 New York City Marathon - 2nd
- 2003 Boston Marathon - 5th
- 2003 New York City Marathon - 3rd
- 2004 New York City Marathon - 6th
- 2005 Rotterdam Marathon - 5th
- 2005 Rock 'n' Roll San Diego Marathon - 1st
- 2006 Rotterdam Marathon - 7th
- 2007 Chicago Marathon - 6th
- 2007 Las Vegas Marathon -1st

=== Half marathons ===
- 2004 City-Pier-City Loop (the Hague) - 1st.

=== Personal bests ===
- Half marathon - 1:00:49 hrs (2000)
- Marathon - 2:08:17 hrs (2002)
