= Viktor Anokhin =

Soviet sprinter

Personal information
- Nationality: Soviet
- Born: 18 July 1951 (age 74) Ufa, Russian SSR, USSR

Sport
- Sport: Sprinting
- Event: 4 × 400 metres relay

Viktor Anokhin (Russian: Виктор Анохин; born 18 July 1951) is a Soviet sprinter. He competed in the men's 4 × 400 metres relay at the 1976 Summer Olympics.
