= Leipzig Marathon =

Annual marathon race in Leipzig, Germany

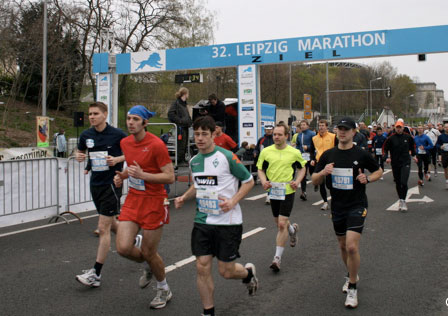
- Leipzig Marathon 2007
- Date: April
- Location: Leipzig, Germany
- Event type: Road
- Distance: Marathon, Half marathon, 10K run
- Established: 1977
- Course records: Men: 2:10:16 h, 2004; Kenya Women: 2:29:40 h, 2004; Kenya
- Website: Leipzig Marathon Homepage

The Leipzig Marathon is an annual marathon held in Leipzig, Germany. It has been held since 1977 and has been held in April since 2000. The organizers and hosts are the Leipzig Marathon e. V. and the Stadtsportbund Leipzig e. V. The program also includes a half marathon, a 10K run, a half marathon for inline skaters, a wheelchair half marathon and a school relay.

== Route ==
Since 2007, the start and finish has been at the Sportforum in the Zentrum-Nordwest locality, near the Arena Leipzig and the Red Bull Arena. The route first leads past the New Town Hall and then passes Augustusplatz with the Gewandhaus, the Opera House and the City-Hochhaus. Then it goes past the Grassi Museum, the Old Trade Fair Leipzig and the Monument to the Battle of the Nations into the Probstheida locality. There the line turns west, passes the Bruno-Plache-Stadion and reaches the Südvorstadt via Zwickauer and Richard-Lehmann-Strasse along Media City Leipzig. The route then crosses the Leipzig Riverside Forest and continues to Schleußig and over the White Elster river to the Kleinzschocher locality, where it turns north and returns to the Sportforum via Plagwitz and Jahnallee.

The length of the route is that of a half marathon. For the length of a marathon, it is necessary to run two laps.

== History ==
The event began as an East German competition and it hosted the German Democratic Republic's national championship on four occasions (1985, 1986, 1987, and 1990).

In 2020, the Leipzig Marathon was cancelled for the first time in its history due to the COVID-19 pandemic. In 2021, for the same reason, it was only held as a purely virtual competition, in which the participants completed the distance on a route of their own choosing. The Leipzig Marathon planned for April 10, 2022 also had to be canceled.

== Past winners ==
Key: Course record

=== Men ===
Date	Men's winner	Country	Time (h:m:s)
April 19, 2026	Jakob Lange	Germany	2:17:43
April 13, 2025	Nic Ihlow	Germany	2:25:42
April 23, 2024	Nic Ihlow	Germany	2:28:59
April 21, 2023	Nic Ihlow	Germany	2:30:03
April 10, 2022			
April 18-26, 2021			
April 26, 2020			
April 14, 2019	Nic Ihlow	Germany	2:24:49
April 22, 2018	Gabriel Svajda	Slovakia	2:35:23
April 9, 2017	Bartosz Olszewski	Poland	2:27:08
April 24, 2016	Marc Werner	Germany	2:39:29
April 19, 2015	Teknelegne Abebe Tebelu	Ethiopia	2:21:53
April 13, 2014	Benedikt Heil	Germany	2:32:47
April 21, 2013	Jakob Stiller	Germany	2:29:31
April 22, 2012	Jakob Stiller	Germany	2:33:30
April 17, 2011	Jakob Stiller	Germany	2:27:59
April 25, 2010	Maksym Salii	Ukraine	2:36:06
April 19, 2009	Maksym Salii	Ukraine	2:31:14
April 20, 2008	Jörg Matthé	Germany	2:37:56
April 22, 2007	Marcel Matanin	Slovakia	2:26:21
April 23, 2006	Marcel Matanin	Slovakia	2:19:33
April 17, 2005	Julius Kiptum Rop	Kenya	2:16:22
April 25, 2004	Christopher Cheboiboch	Kenya	2:10:16 CR
April 13, 2003	Mykola Rudyk	Ukraine	2:17:50
April 28, 2002	Carsten Eich	Germany	2:13:47
April 29, 2001	Stephan Freigang	Germany	2:15:57
April 16, 2000	Stanisław Cembrzyński	Poland	2:36:25
June 12, 1999	Peter Kapitza	Germany	2:28:58
June 13, 1998	Michael Asperger	Germany	2:29:21
June 14, 1997	Klaus Goldammer	Germany	2:31:29
March 31, 1996	Klaus Goldammer	Germany	2:33:42
March 26, 1995	Michael Asperger	Germany	2:32:18
March 27, 1994	Lars Neubauer	Germany	2:25:54
April 18, 1993	Matthias Körner	Germany	2:37:46
June 13, 1992	Janusz Sarnicki	Poland	2:23:55
June 22, 1991	Jerzy Skarżyński	Poland	2:22:50
June 16, 1990	Klaus Goldammer	East Germany	2:25:05
June 17, 1989	Jörg Peter	East Germany	2:31:38
June 18, 1988	Jörg Otto	East Germany	2:27:24
June 20, 1987	Michael Heilmann	East Germany	2:14:17
June 22, 1986	Uwe Koch	East Germany	2:17:04
June 22, 1985	Jörg Peter	East Germany	2:12:32
June 23, 1984	Klaus Goldammer	East Germany	2:26:05
June 18, 1983	Andreas Sprenger	East Germany	2:17:23
June 19, 1982	Klaus Goldammer	East Germany	2:30:42
June 20, 1981	Klaus Goldammer	East Germany	2:27:00
June 14, 1980	Karl-Heinz Baumbach	East Germany	2:32:25
June 16, 1979	Detlef Kröplin	East Germany	2:28:42
June 10, 1978	Detlef Kröplin	East Germany	2:31:17
June 18, 1977	Roland Winkler	East Germany	2:37:07

=== Women ===
Date	Women's winner	Country	Time (h:m:s)
April 19, 2026	Antonia Müller	Germany	2:43:07
April 13, 2025	Yvonne van Vlerken	Netherlands	2:47:12
April 23, 2024	Antonia Müller	Germany	2:54:30
April 21, 2023	Yvonne van Vlerken	Netherlands	2:44:27
April 10, 2022			
April 18-26, 2021			
April 26, 2020			
April 14, 2019	Yvonne van Vlerken	Netherlands	2:47:53
April 22, 2018	Juliane Meyer	Germany	3:00:37
April 9, 2017	Juliane Meyer	Germany	2:58:00
April 24, 2016	Laura Clart	Germany	2:53:47
April 19, 2015	Juliane Meyer	Germany	2:57:39
April 13, 2014	Anja Jakob	Germany	2:58:57
April 21, 2013	Sandra Boitz	Germany	2:53:40
April 22, 2012	Carina Schipp	Germany	2:57:35
April 17, 2011	Frida Södermark	Sweden	2:51:33
April 25, 2010	Carina Schipp	Germany	2:53:34
April 19, 2009	Carina Schipp	Germany	3:01:50
April 20, 2008	Carina Schipp	Germany	3:04:44
April 22, 2007	Tanja Semjonowa	Germany	3:16:40
April 23, 2006	Svetlana Ivanova	Latvia	2:49:35
April 17, 2005	Judy Kiplimo	Kenya	2:46:06
April 25, 2004	Tegla Loroupe	Kenya	2:29:40 CR
April 13, 2003	Tanja Semjonowa	Germany	2:58:01
April 28, 2002	Tanja Semjonowa	Germany	2:57:02
April 29, 2001	Tanja Semjonowa	Germany	2:53:45
April 16, 2000	Tanja Semjonowa	Germany	3:05:35
June 12, 1999	Kathrin Behrens	Germany	3:21:32
June 13, 1998	Tanja Semjonowa	Germany	3:06:27
June 14, 1997	Konstanze Saar	Germany	3:25:43
March 31, 1996	Elfriede Hofer	Germany	3:15:42
March 26, 1995	Konstanze Saar	Germany	3:14:33
March 27, 1994	Beate Kauke	Germany	2:57:58
April 18, 1993	Helga Heinze	Germany	3:43:56
June 13, 1992	Birgit Lennartz	Germany	2:47:54
June 22, 1991	Anuța Cătună	Romania	2:45:07
June 16, 1990	Andrea Fleischer	East Germany	2:41:59
June 17, 1989	Ina Ferkl	East Germany	3:02:39
June 18, 1988	Beate Kauke	East Germany	3:01:15
June 20, 1987	Uta Pippig	East Germany	2:30:50
June 22, 1986	Uta Pippig	East Germany	2:37:56
June 22, 1985	Birgit Weinhold	East Germany	2:32:48
June 23, 1984	Birgit Schuckmann	East Germany	2:53:45
June 18, 1983	Gabi Schmidt	East Germany	2:51:37
June 19, 1982	Petra Zocher	East Germany	2:56:29
June 20, 1981	Petra Zocher	East Germany	2:58:00
June 14, 1980	Gudrun Strohbach	East Germany	3:40:56
June 16, 1979	Inge Naumann	East Germany	3:18:19
June 10, 1978	Irmgard Kretzschmar	East Germany	3:25:58
June 18, 1977	Rosemarie Pfeiffer	East Germany	3:53:55

=== Multiple wins ===
Men's
Athlete	Wins	Years
Klaus Goldammer (GDR)	6	1981, 1982, 1984, 1990, 1996, 1997
Nic Ihlow (GER)	4	2019, 2023, 2024, 2025
Jakob Stiller (GER)	3	2011, 2012, 2013
Maksym Salii (UKR)	2	2009, 2010
Marcel Matanin (SVK)	2	2006, 2007
Jörg Peter (GDR)	2	1985, 1989
Detlef Kröplin (GDR)	2	1977, 1978

Women's
Athlete	Wins	Years
Tanja Semjonowa (GER)	6	1998, 2000, 2001, 2002, 2003, 2007
Yvonne van Vlerken (NED)	3	2019, 2023, 2025
Juliane Meyer (GER)	3	2015, 2017, 2018
Carina Schipp (GER)	3	2008, 2009, 2010
Konstanze Saar (GER)	2	1995, 1997
Beate Kauke (GDR)	2	1988, 1994
Uta Pippig (GDR)	2	1986, 1987
Petra Zocher (GDR)	2	1981, 1982
