= Hannu Mäkelä (athlete) =

Finnish sprinter

Personal information
- Nationality: Finnish
- Born: 23 April 1949 (age 77)

Sport
- Sport: Sprinting
- Event: 4 × 400 metres relay

Hannu Mäkelä (born 23 April 1949) is a Finnish sprinter. He competed in the men's 4 × 400 metres relay at the 1976 Summer Olympics.
