= Fons Brydenbach =

Belgian sprinter

Personal information
- Born: 12 October 1954 Vorselaar, Belgium
- Died: 8 May 2009 (aged 54) Wechelderzande, Belgium

Sport
- Sport: Track and field
Medal record
Representing Belgium
European Indoor Championships
Gold medal – first place	1974 Gothenburg	400 m
Gold medal – first place	1977 San Sebastián	400 m
Summer Universiade
Gold medal – first place	1977 Sofia	400 m

Alfons ("Fons") Brydenbach (12 October 1954 – 8 May 2009) was a Belgian sprinter who specialized in the 400 metres. He is a former world indoor record holder.

== Career ==
He was born in 1954 in Vorselaar. In 1973 he won the gold medal at the European Junior Championships. With the time of 45.86 seconds he smashed the previous championship record. The championship record stood until 1979, when Hartmut Weber broke it. Also in 1973, he took his first Belgian title in the 400 metres. He would defend 1976, 1977, 1978, 1979 and 1981, but faced competition from Mario De Marchi, Christian Allemeersch and Eddy De Leeuw. Brydenbach also won the Belgian 100 metres title in 1975 and the 200 metres title in 1974 and 1975.

In 1974 Brydenbach won the gold medal at the European Indoor Championships, ahead of Andreas Scheibe and Günter Arnold. In the same year he set a new world indoor record with 45.9 seconds. At the 1975 European Indoor Championships he only reached the semi-final, but at the 1977 European Indoor Championships, he won another gold medal.

In 1976, still only 21 years old, Brydenbach competed at the 1976 Summer Olympics in Montreal. After running in 45.28 seconds in the semi-final, he improved to 45.04 seconds in the final race. He finished fourth, but the time was a lifetime best result. It was a Belgian record, and stood until 2003 when Cédric Van Branteghem broke it. He came close to improving the result at the 1980 Summer Olympics, where he finished fifth in the final with 45.10 seconds. He also competed in the 4 × 400 metre relay, but the team failed to finish. The next year he contributed to a Belgian record in this event—3:03.68 minutes, which stood until 2008. Brydenbach also won the gold medal at the 1977 Summer Universiade. His new championship record of 45.18 seconds stood for two years.

Brydenbach had 10.46 seconds in the 100 metres and 20.68 seconds in the 200 metres, both achieved in 1975.

== Personal life and death ==
Brydenbach held a master's degree in physical education from the Katholieke Universiteit Leuven, and worked as a teacher. He was married, had three children and resided in Wechelderzande. He died of bladder cancer in May 2009.
