= Gabriele Ferrero =

Italian middle-distance runner

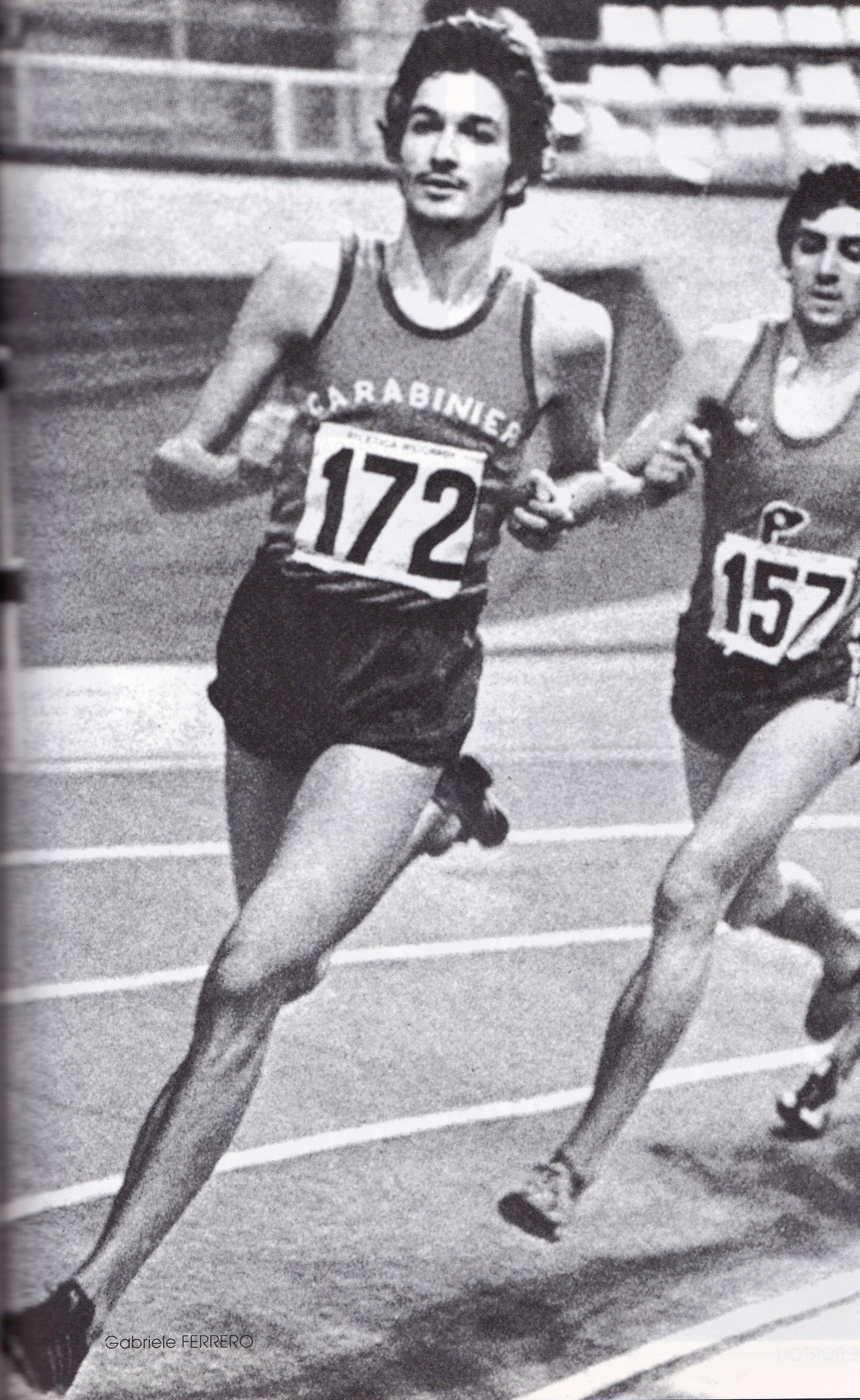
- Ferrero (#172) in 1970s.

Personal information
- National team: Italy: 16 caps (1976–1981)
- Born: 2 January 1957 (age 69) Treviso, Italy

Sport
- Sport: Athletics
- Event: Middle-distance running
- Club: Carabinieri Bologna (1976–1978); Snia Milano (1979–1982)

Achievements and titles
- Personal best: 80 m indoor: 1:47.64 (1977)

Gabriele Ferrero (born 2 January 1957) is a former Italian middle-distance runner who placed 6th in the 1978 European Indoor Championships.

== Achievements ==
Year	Competition	Venue	Rank	Event	Time	Notes
1978	European Indoor Championships	(Italy) Milan	6th	800 m	1:49.5	

== National titles ==
Ferrero won three national championships at individual senior level.

- Italian Athletics Championships
  - 800 m: 1977, 1982 (2)
- Italian Athletics Indoor Championships
  - 800 m: 1978 (1)
