= Fred Newhouse =

American sprinter (1948–2025)

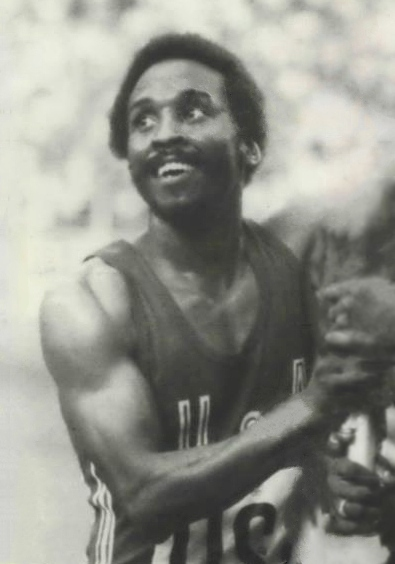
- Newhouse at the 1976 Olympics

Personal information
- Full name: Frederick Vaughn Newhouse
- Born: November 8, 1948 Honey Grove, Texas, U.S.
- Died: January 20, 2025 (aged 76)
- Height: 175 cm (5 ft 9 in)
- Weight: 68 kg (150 lb)

Sport
- Sport: Athletics
- Event: 100–400 m
- Club: Baton Rouge Track Club

Achievements and titles
- Personal bests: 100 yd – 9.6 (1968); 220 yd – 20.5 (1970); 400 m – 44.2 (1972)
Medal record
Representing the United States
Olympic Games
Gold medal – first place	1976 Montreal	4 × 400 m relay
Silver medal – second place	1976 Montreal	400 m
Pan American Games
Gold medal – first place	1971 Cali	4 × 400 m
Silver medal – second place	1971 Cali	400 m

Frederick Vaughn Newhouse (November 8, 1948 – January 20, 2025) was an American sprinter. He won a gold medal in the 4 × 400 meter relay and an individual silver in the 400 m, both at the 1971 Pan American Games and at the 1976 Olympics. His individual time of 44.40 seconds at the Olympics was the second fastest time of the 1970s.

Newhouse was one of the organizers of the Northwest Flyers Track Club in Houston, Texas. He graduated from Galilee High School in Hallsville, Texas. After graduating Prairie View A&M with a degree in electrical engineering, he received his master's degree in international business. He was director of public affairs for Valero Energy and served as the assistant treasurer of the Prairie View A&M Foundation.

Newhouse lived in Houston. After graduating, he was accepted into Prairie View A&M University in Texas and the University of Washington in Seattle, earning his degrees in electrical engineering and masters of international business. He served two years in the United States Army in between his undergraduate and graduate. After graduation he worked as an engineer with Exxon in Baton Rouge.

In his life, Newhouse had volunteered for the boards of directors for United States Olympic Committee and USA Track and Field. He was one of the past chairmen of the board of the Texas City/ LaMarque Chamber of Commerce, chair-elect for the Houston East End Chamber of Commerce, chairman of Houston's Community Family Center, and vice-chair of the Black Heritage Committee – Houston Livestock Show and Rodeo. Newhouse served on the Capital Campaign Committee for Prairie View A&M University. As well he was a supporter of the United Way and Boy Scouts of America. While being a part of Prairie View A&M, Newhouse became a three-time All-American and National Champion in the sport Track and Field. In 1976, he won Gold and Silver Medals participating in the Montreal Canada Olympic Games. By 2000, Newhouse was appointed team leader for the United States Men's Track and Field squad going to the Olympic Games in Sydney, Australia. He lived on to ref for the Texas Relays and the Texas State UIL Track and Field Championships.

Newhouse was inducted into the Texas Track and Field Coaches Hall of Fame, Class of 2014.

Newhouse died on January 20, 2025, at the age of 76.
