= Jörg Peter =

German long-distance runner

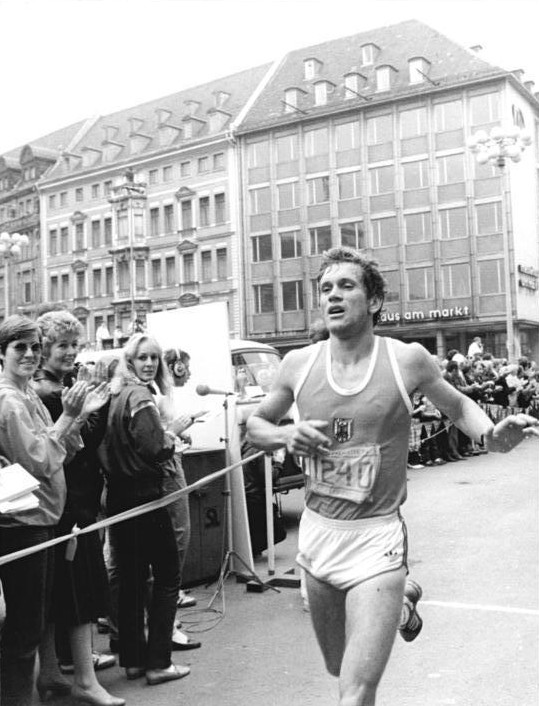
- Peter in 1985

Medal record

Men's athletics

Representing East Germany

European Indoor Championships
Bronze medal – third place	1978 Milan	3000 m

Jörg Peter (born 23 October 1955 in Dresden) is a German former long-distance runner. He held the German record over the marathon distance from 1988 till 2015.

== Biography ==
Peter won bronze at the 3000 m run at the 1978 European Indoor Championships. In 1980 he competed for the DDR at the 1980 Olympic Games in Moscow in the men's 10,000-meter run and finished in 6th place.

In February 1988, he won the Tokyo International Men's Marathon with a 2:08:47, which remained the German Record until 25 October 2015, when Arne Gabius improved the time by 14 seconds. Peter started until 1990 for the SC unit Dresden. He was East German champion in 5000-meter run in the years 1976, 1977, 1978 and 1980, in the 10,000-meter run in 1977 and in 1985 by his marathon victory at the Leipzig Marathon.

In 1990 and 1991 he won the Hamburg Marathon.

== Achievements ==
Year	Competition	Venue	Position	Event	Notes
Representing East Germany
1977	IAAF World Cup	Düsseldorf, West Germany	2nd	10,000 m	28:34.00
1978	European Indoor Championships	Milan, Italy	3rd	3000 m	7:50.1
1980	Summer Olympics	Moscow, Soviet Union	6th	10,000 m	28:05.5
1985	Leipzig Marathon	Leipzig, East Germany	1st	Marathon	2:12:32
1986	European Championships	Stuttgart, West Germany	17th	Marathon	2:18:05
1987	Košice Peace Marathon	Košice, Czechoslovakia	1st	Marathon	2:14:59
1988	Olympic Games	Seoul, South Korea	—	Marathon	DNF
1989	Leipzig Marathon	Leipzig, East Germany	1st	Marathon	2:31:38
Representing Germany
1990	Hamburg Marathon	Hamburg, West Germany	1st	Marathon	2:11:49
1991	Hamburg Marathon	Hamburg, Germany	1st	Marathon	2:10:43
1991	World Championships	Tokyo, Japan	—	Marathon	DNF
