= Franz-Peter Hofmeister =

German sprinter (born 1951)

Personal information
- Born: 5 August 1951 (age 74) Kerpen, West Germany
- Height: 1.85 m (6 ft 1 in)
- Weight: 71 kg (157 lb)
Medal record
Men's athletics
Representing West Germany
Olympic Games
Bronze medal – third place	1976 Montreal	4×400 m
European Championships
Gold medal – first place	1978 Prague	400 m
Gold medal – first place	1978 Prague	4×400 m
Silver medal – second place	1971 Helsinki	200 m
European Indoor Championships
Gold medal – first place	1975 Katowice	4×320 m
Summer Universiade
Silver medal – second place	1979 Mexico City	400 m

Franz-Peter Hofmeister (born 5 August 1951) is a West German athlete who competed mainly in the 400 metres.

He competed for West Germany in the 1976 Summer Olympics held in Montreal, Quebec, Canada in the 4 × 400 metre relay where he won the bronze medal with his teammates Lothar Krieg, Harald Schmid and Bernd Herrmann.

He was born in Kerpen, North Rhine-Westphalia.
