= Bernd Herrmann =

German sprinter (born 1951)

Personal information
- Born: 22 November 1951 (age 74) Hohenkirchen, West Germany
Medal record
Men's athletics
Representing West Germany
Olympic Games
Bronze medal – third place	1976 Montreal	4×400 m relay
European Championships
Gold medal – first place	1978 Prague	4×400 m relay
Bronze medal – third place	1974 Rome	400 m
Summer Universiade
Bronze medal – third place	1973 Moscow	4x400 m relay

Bernd Herrmann (born 22 November 1951) was a West German athlete who competed mainly in the 400 metres.

He competed for West Germany at the 1976 Summer Olympics held in Montreal, Quebec, Canada where he won the bronze medal in the men's 4 × 400 metre relay with his teammates Franz-Peter Hofmeister, Lothar Krieg and Harald Schmid. He also competed at the 1972 Summer Olympics.
