= Karl Fleschen =

German distance runner (born 1955)

Medal record

Men's athletics

Representing West Germany

European Indoor Championships
| Gold medal – first place | 1977 San Sebastián | 3000 m |
| Gold medal – first place | 1980 Sindelfingen | 3000 m |

Karl Fleschen (born 28 June 1955 in Daun) is a retired West German runner who specialized in the 1500, 3000, 5000 and 10,000 metres.

He held the world record in the rarely contested 4 x 1500 metres relay (14:38.8 minutes with Thomas Wessinghage, Harald Hudak and Michael Lederer). In addition he still holds the German record in 25 km road race, with 1:13:58 hours from 1978.

He competed for the sports clubs LG Vulkaneifel and Bayer 04 Leverkusen during his active career. At the West German championships, in the 1500 metres, Fleschen won the bronze medal in 1976 and silver medal in 1977 (both times one spot behind Thomas Wessinghage). Fleschen also won the bronze medal at the 1976 West German indoor championships and gold medal in 1982. In the long distances, he became West German indoor champion in the 3000 metres in 1977 and 1980 (as well as two silver and one bronze). In the 5000 metres, he became national champion in 1977, 1980, 1981 and 1984 (and silver medallist in 1978); in the 10,000 metres he took four titles in a row from 1978 to 1981 (as well as two additional medals); and he also took one national title in the half marathon in 1978.

== Achievements ==
| Year | Tournament | Venue | Result | Extra |
|---|---|---|---|---|
| 1977 | European Indoor Championships | San Sebastián, Spain | 1st | 3000 m |
| 1978 | European Championships | Prague, Czechoslovakia | 13th | 5000 m |
| 1980 | European Indoor Championships | Sindelfingen, West Germany | 1st | 3000 m |
| 1984 | European Indoor Championships | Gothenburg, Sweden | 3rd | 3000 m |

Sporting positions
| Preceded by (New Zealand) Rod Dixon | Men's 3.000m Best Year Performance; 1977 | Succeeded by (Kenya) Henry Rono |
