= 1977 European Athletics Indoor Championships =

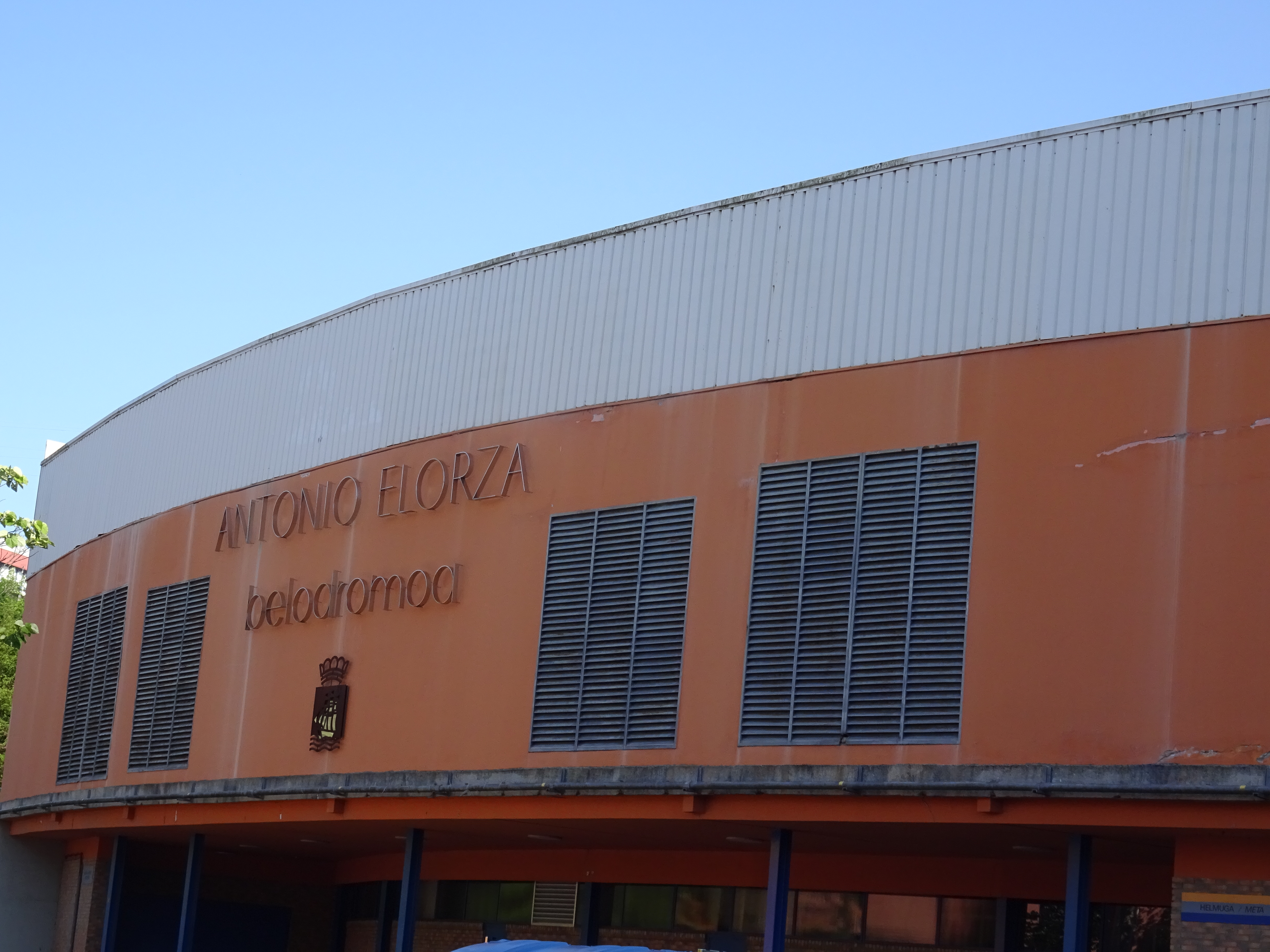
- Dates: 12–13 March 1977
- Host city: San Sebastián; Spain
- Venue: Velódromo de Anoeta
- Events: 19
- Participation: 240 athletes from 24 nations
- Records set: 1 WR, 10 CR

The 1977 European Athletics Indoor Championships were held in San Sebastián, a city in Spain, on 12 and 13 March 1977.

== Medal summary ==
=== Men ===
Event	Gold		Silver		Bronze	
60 metres	Valeriy Borzov (URS)	6.59	Christer Garpenborg (SWE)	6.60	Marian Woronin (POL)	6.67
400 metres	Fons Brijdenbach (BEL)	46.53	Francis Demarthon (FRA)	47.11	Marian Gęsicki (POL)	47.21
800 metres	Sebastian Coe (GBR)	1:46.54 CR	Erwin Gohlke (GDR)	1:47.2a	Rolf Gysin (SUI)	1:47.6a
1500 metres	Jürgen Straub (GDR)	3:46.5a	Paul-Heinz Wellmann (FRG)	3:46.6a	János Zemen (HUN)	3:46.6a
3000 metres	Karl Fleschen (FRG)	7:57.5a	Pekka Päivärinta (FIN)	7:59.3a	Markus Ryffel (SUI)	8:00.3a
60 metres hurdles	Thomas Munkelt (GDR)	7.62 CR	Viktor Myasnikov (URS)	7.79	Arto Bryggare (FIN)	7.79
High jump	Jacek Wszoła (POL)	2.25 CR	Rolf Beilschmidt (GDR)	2.22	Ruud Wielart (NED)	2.22
Pole vault	Władysław Kozakiewicz (POL)	5.51 CR	Antti Kalliomäki (FIN)	5.31	Mariusz Klimczyk (POL)	5.20
Long jump	Hans Baumgartner (FRG)	7.96	Lutz Franke (GDR)	7.89	László Szalma (HUN)	7.78
Triple jump	Viktor Sanyeyev (URS)	16.65	Jaak Uudmäe (URS)	16.46	Bernard Lamitié (FRA)	16.45
Shot put	Hreinn Halldórsson (ISL)	20.59	Geoff Capes (GBR)	20.46	Władysław Komar (POL)	20.17

=== Women ===
Event	Gold		Silver		Bronze	
60 metres	Marlies Oelsner (GDR)	7.17	Lyudmila Storozhkova (URS)	7.24	Rita Bottiglieri (ITA)	7.34
400 metres	Marita Koch (GDR)	51.14 WR	Verona Elder (GBR)	52.75	Jelica Pavličić (YUG)	53.49
800 metres	Jane Colebrook (GBR)	2:01.12 CR	Totka Petrova (BUL)	2:01.17	Elżbieta Katolik (POL)	2:01.3a
1500 metres	Mary Stewart (GBR)	4:09.37 CR	Vesela Yatsinska (BUL)	4:10.0a	Rumyana Chavdarova (BUL)	4:11.3a
60 metres hurdles	Lyubov Nikitenko (URS)	8.29	Zofia Filip (POL)	8.34	Rita Bottiglieri (ITA)	8.39
High jump	Sara Simeoni (ITA)	1.92 =CR	Brigitte Holzapfel (FRG)	1.89	Edit Sámuel (HUN)	1.86
Long jump	Jarmila Nygrýnová (TCH)	6.63	Ildikó Erdélyi (HUN)	6.55	Heidemarie Wycisk (GDR)	6.40
Shot put	Helena Fibingerová (TCH)	21.46 CR	Ilona Slupianek (GDR)	21.12	Eva Wilms (FRG)	20.87

== Medal table ==
Rank	Nation	Gold	Silver	Bronze	Total
1	East Germany (GDR)	4	4	1	9
2	Soviet Union (URS)	3	3	0	6
3	Great Britain (GBR)	3	2	0	5
4	West Germany (FRG)	2	2	1	5
5	Poland (POL)	2	1	5	8
6	Czechoslovakia (TCH)	2	0	0	2
7	Italy (ITA)	1	0	2	3
8	Belgium (BEL)	1	0	0	1
8	Iceland (ISL)	1	0	0	1
10	Bulgaria (BUL)	0	2	1	3
10	Finland (FIN)	0	2	1	3
12	Hungary (HUN)	0	1	3	4
13	France (FRA)	0	1	1	2
14	Sweden (SWE)	0	1	0	1
15	Switzerland (SUI)	0	0	2	2
16	Netherlands (NED)	0	0	1	1
16	Yugoslavia (YUG)	0	0	1	1
Totals (17 entries)		19	19	19	57

== Participating nations ==
- Belgium (12)
- Bulgaria (12)
- Czechoslovakia (8)
- East Germany (17)
- Finland (9)
- France (26)
- Great Britain (10)
- Greece (3)
- Hungary (11)
- Iceland (1)
- Ireland (1)
- Italy (13)
- Liechtenstein (1)
- Luxembourg (1)
- Netherlands (7)
- Poland (21)
- Portugal (1)
- Soviet Union (19)
- Spain (18)
- Sweden (5)
- Switzerland (7)
- Turkey (2)
- West Germany (31)
- Yugoslavia (4)
