= Francis Demarthon =

French sprinter

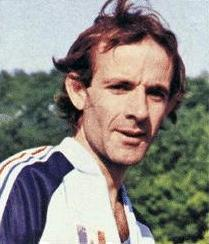
- Francis Demarthon, a French former sprinter

Medal record

Men's athletics

Representing France

European Championships
Bronze medal – third place	1978 Prague	400 m

European Indoor Championships
Silver medal – second place	1977 San Sebastián	400 m

Francis Demarthon (born 8 August 1950) is a French former sprinter who competed in the 1980 Summer Olympics. Specializing in the 400 metres, his personal best was 45.89 seconds. He won the event at the 1979 Mediterranean Games and won a bronze medal at the 1978 European Athletics Championships.
