= Lothar Krieg =

German sprinter (born 1955)

Personal information
- Born: 10 December 1955 (age 70) Darmstadt, West Germany

Sport
- Sport: Track and field
Medal record
Representing West Germany
Summer Olympics
Bronze medal – third place	1976 Montreal	4 × 400 m relay
Summer Universiade
Bronze medal – third place	1977 Sofia	4 x 400 m relay

Lothar Krieg (born 10 December 1955) was a West German athlete who competed mainly in the 400 metres.

He competed for West Germany in the 1976 Summer Olympics held in Montreal, Canada in the 4 × 400 metre relay where he won the bronze medal with his teammates Franz-Peter Hofmeister, Harald Schmid and Bernd Herrmann.
