= Marian Gęsicki =

Polish runner (born 1953)

Medal record

Men's athletics

European Indoor Championships
| Bronze medal – third place | 1977 San Sebastián | 400 m |

Marian Gęsicki (born 19 May 1953) is a retired Polish runner who specialized in the 400 metres and 800 metres.

He was born in Nowogródek and represented the club Zawisza Bydgoszcz. He finished fifth in the 800 metres at the 1975 European Indoor Championships. In 1976 he competed at the Olympic Games, reaching the semi-final in the 800 metres. At the 1977 European Indoor Championships he won the bronze medal in the 400 metres. He finished fourth in the 800 metres at the 1978 European Indoor Championships.

He became Polish champion in the 800 metres in 1976, 1977, 1978 and 1980. He became Polish indoor champion in the 400 metres in 1974 and 1977, and in the 800 metres in 1975, 1978 and 1981.

His personal best time was 1.45.4 minutes, achieved in July 1975 at Bislett stadion.
