= Herman Frazier =

American track and field athlete, college athletics administrator

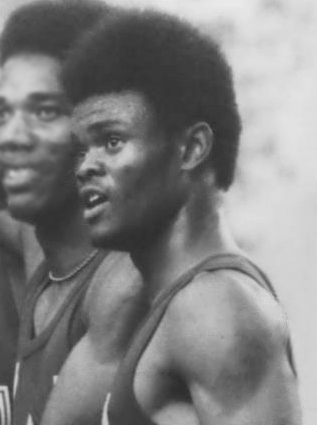
- Frazier at the 1976 Olympics

Personal information
- Full name: Herman Ronald Frazier
- Born: October 29, 1954 (age 71) Philadelphia, Pennsylvania, U.S.
- Occupations: Athletic Director, University of Hawaii (2002–2008)
- Height: 184 cm (6 ft 0 in)
- Weight: 73 kg (161 lb)

Sport
- Sport: Athletics
- Event: 100–400 m
- Club: Philadelphia Pioneer Club
- Turned pro: 1977

Achievements and titles
- Personal bests: 100 yd – 9.4 (1974); 100 m – 10.36 (1977); 200 m – 20.75 (1977); 400 m – 44.95 (1976)
Medal record
Representing the United States
Olympic Games
Gold medal – first place	1976 Montreal	4 × 400 m relay
Bronze medal – third place	1976 Montreal	400 m
Pan American Games
Gold medal – first place	1975 Mexico City	4 × 400 m
Gold medal – first place	1979 San Juan	4 × 400 m
Athletics World Cup
Gold medal – first place	1979 Montreal	4 × 400 m relay

Herman Ronald "Herm" Frazier (born October 29, 1954) is a retired American sprinter. He won gold medals in the 4 × 400 m relay at the 1976 Olympics and 1975 and 1979 Pan American Games. Individually he earned a bronze medal in the 400 m event at the 1976 Olympics. He served as chef de mission of the 2004 U.S. Olympic team and as the Athletic Director at the University of Alabama at Birmingham and the University of Hawaii. He currently serves as the senior deputy athletics director at Syracuse University.

== Athlete ==
Frazier started his athletic career as multiple sport athlete at Germantown High School in Philadelphia. He was a member of the Philadelphia Pioneers Track Club where he was coached by Alex Woodley. His collegiate career began at Denison University. He later attended Arizona State University, where he became an All-American sprinter. He was the team captain of the 1977 national championship track team. He graduated from ASU in 1977 with a degree in political science.

As a member of the US National Track & Field team, Frazier participated both in the Olympic and Pan-American games. In the 1976 Montreal Olympics, he ran the first leg for the gold medal-winning 4 × 400-meter relay team. Individually, he won a bronze medal in the 400-meter dash. He was also a gold medalist at both the 1975 and 1979 Pan-American Games. In 1980, he was a member of the U.S. Olympic Track and Field team that boycotted the Summer Olympic Games in Moscow. He also tried to qualify for the 1980 Winter Olympics as a bobsledder.

== Administrator ==
Frazier began his administrative career as a graduate assistant at Arizona State University in 1977. He would later become a full-time administrator and remained with the university for a total of 23 years, eventually becoming the Senior Associate Athletics Director. He would earn his first athletics director job at the University of Alabama at Birmingham in 2000. In 2002, he left UAB to accept the athletic director position at the University of Hawaii where he would remain until 2008. Frazier was fired the day after he failed to re-sign football coach June Jones.

In 2008 Frazier was named associate athletic director for sports administration at Temple University, and stayed there until 2011. In July 2011, he was hired at Syracuse University by Daryl Gross to take similar position.

He has served on the U.S. Olympic Committee in numerous capacities. In 1996, he was elected as one of three vice-presidents for the committee and accompanied the team to the 2000 games in Sydney, Australia. Most recently, he served as the chef de mission for the 2004 games in Athens, Greece. He has also served on the U.S. Olympic Athletes Advisory Council and the U.S. Olympic Overview Commission.

As a member of the Fiesta Bowl Board of Directors, he was vice-president in 1996 and chairman in 1998 and 1999.

Frazier was the director of athletics at the University of Alabama at Birmingham (UAB) from 2000-2002.

Frazier served as the board-chair for Syracuse Stage and The Bowerman Advisory Board.

Frazier has overseen the participation of the Syracuse football team in six bowl games, including most recently the 2024 DIRECTV Holiday Bowl. In 2012, Frazier received the National Association of Collegiate Directors of Athletics Pioneer Award for his position as Chef de Mission for the 2004 Summer Olympics.

Syracuse University announced Frazier's retirement in February 2026 - “I’m retiring from the athletics department,’’ he said, “but I’ll still be involved with USA Track and the United States Olympic & Paralympic Committee.’’ On Monday, his first official day of retirement, he will fly to Los Angeles, where he is scheduled to speak about the 2028 Los Angeles Olympic Games for SU’s Falk College at the Intuit Dome.

== Honors ==
Frazier was inducted into the Denison Big Red Hall of Fame in 1989.

Frazier has received numerous honors, including the NCAA Silver Anniversary Award (Class of 2002), which recognizes "distinguished former student-athletes on their 25th anniversary as college graduates". Frazier was one of 461 athletes to receive a Congressional Gold Medal due to the US boycott of the 1980 Olympics.

In 2003 he was cited as one of the 101 Most Influential Minorities in Sports by Sports Illustrated. He was named as one of The 50 Most Powerful African Americans in Sports in the March 2005 issue of Black Enterprise magazine. In 2002, the Herman R. Frazier Political Science Scholarship was established by his friends and colleagues at Arizona State University to "celebrate and honor Mr. Frazier’s lifetime achievements" and award a "deserving political science student."

In 2012, Frazier was awarded the Pioneer Award for his role in the 2004 Olympic Games, honoring minority 'first' in athletics, by the National Association of Collegiate Directors of Athletics.

On November 5, 2020, Frazier was inducted into the Philadelphia Sports Hall of Fame.

== Criticism ==
Frazier was criticized by some for leaving UAB with a $7.5 million deficit. His supporters noted that he had inherited a deficit and did not receive institutional support, while his detractors claimed that he was ineffective in increasing revenue.

On January 8, 2008, Herman Frazier was fired from his position as athletic director at the University of Hawaii following heavy criticism from the fans and media of the State of Hawaii. On March 3, 2007, he was loudly booed by the crowd following the final home game of the University of Hawaii's head basketball coach Riley Wallace. Frazier is widely viewed as having forced Wallace to resign by including a "no-extension" clause in his final contract. However, Wallace has accepted responsibility by saying, "The bottom line is Riley Wallace signed the contract." Frazier was also criticized by both the media and public for ongoing delays and a perceived lack of integrity in finalizing the full 2007 Hawaii Warriors football team schedule. Frazier admitted that he may have miscalculated in regards to the schedule but stands by his record at Hawaii citing, in part, his balancing of the athletics budget. He inherited a $2.5 million deficit from his predecessor. (Note: It was discovered after Frasier left that the so-called "balanced budget" left the athletic department with an even greater debt hovering around $6 million even after the windfall from the Sugar Bowl.) Finally, Frazier also received the brunt of the blame for then UH football coach, June Jones, leaving the university for Southern Methodist University.

On April 6, 2009, Jim Bolla—who Frazier hired in 2004—was fired as the women's basketball coach for Hawaii after former players complained of a "pattern of verbal abuse" from Bolla. Former UH player Pamela Tambini told the Honolulu Advertiser that players complained for years about their treatment by Bolla to Frazier but Frazier apparently took no actions. The paper quoted Tambini stating: "Everybody knew about it and did nothing about it ... We were going through hell. No student should have had to go through that. It's not fair."
