= 1978 European Athletics Championships – Men's 400 metres hurdles =

Men's 400 metres hurdles at the European Athletics Championships

The men's 400 metres hurdles at the 1978 European Athletics Championships was held in Prague, then Czechoslovakia, at Stadion Evžena Rošického on 29, 30, and 31 August 1978.

== Medalists ==
Gold	Harald Schmid; West Germany
Silver	Dmitriy Stukalov; Soviet Union
Bronze	Vasiliy Arkhipenko; Soviet Union

== Results ==
=== Final ===
31 August

Rank	Name	Nationality	Time	Notes
1st place, gold medalist(s)	Harald Schmid	West Germany	48.51	CR
2nd place, silver medalist(s)	Dmitriy Stukalov	Soviet Union	49.72	
3rd place, bronze medalist(s)	Vasiliy Arkhipenko	Soviet Union	49.77	
4	Franz Meier	Switzerland	49.84	
5	Harry Schulting	Netherlands	50.07	
6	Jean-Claude Nallet	France	50.10	
7	José Alonso	Spain	50.19	
8	Horia Toboc	Romania	50.46	

=== Semi-finals ===
30 August

==== Semi-final 1 ====
Rank	Name	Nationality	Time	Notes
1	Harald Schmid	West Germany	50.07	Q
2	José Alonso	Spain	50.32	Q
3	Horia Toboc	Romania	50.42	Q
4	Dmitriy Stukalov	Soviet Union	50.51	Q
5	Stavros Tziortzis	Greece	50.83	
6	Peter Haas	Switzerland	51.29	
7	Axel Salander	West Germany	51.63	
8	Yanko Bratanov	Bulgaria	52.39	

==== Semi-final 2 ====
Rank	Name	Nationality	Time	Notes
1	Vasiliy Arkhipenko	Soviet Union	49.92	Q
2	Jean-Claude Nallet	France	49.98	Q
3	Franz Meier	Switzerland	50.12	Q
4	Harry Schulting	Netherlands	50.22	Q
5	Georgios Parris	Greece	50.66	
6	Rok Kopitar	Yugoslavia	50.98	
7	Lars-Åke Welander	Sweden	50.99	
8	Thomas Löwe	West Germany	51.96	

=== Heats ===
29 August

==== Heat 1 ====
Rank	Name	Nationality	Time	Notes
1	Dmitriy Stukalov	Soviet Union	50.35	Q
2	Harry Schulting	Netherlands	50.39	Q
3	Peter Haas	Switzerland	50.45	Q
4	José Carvalho	Portugal	51.02	
5	Christer Gullstrand	Sweden	51.03	
6	Gary Oakes	Great Britain	52.08	
7	Felix Rummele	Austria	52.13	

==== Heat 2 ====
Rank	Name	Nationality	Time	Notes
1	Thomas Löwe	West Germany	50.34	Q
2	Yanko Bratanov	Bulgaria	50.45	Q
3	Horia Toboc	Romania	50.75	Q
4	Oleg Bulatkin	Soviet Union	50.90	
5	Claude Anicet	France	51.68	
6	Miroslav Kodejš	Czechoslovakia	51.98	
7	Bill Hartley	Great Britain	52.15	

==== Heat 3 ====
Rank	Name	Nationality	Time	Notes
1	Harald Schmid	West Germany	49.78	Q
2	Rok Kopitar	Yugoslavia	50.43	Q
3	Georgios Parris	Greece	50.45	Q
4	Jean-Claude Nallet	France	50.49	q
5	Alan Pascoe	Great Britain	50.95	
6	Ladislav Kárský	Czechoslovakia	51.38	
7	Lars Nilsen	Denmark	51.48	

==== Heat 4 ====
Rank	Name	Nationality	Time	Notes
1	Vasiliy Arkhipenko	Soviet Union	50.15	Q
2	José Alonso	Spain	50.27	Q
3	Stavros Tziortzis	Greece	50.49	Q
4	Axel Salander	West Germany	50.55	q
5	Franz Meier	Switzerland	50.66	q
6	Lars-Åke Welander	Sweden	50.72	q

== Participation ==
According to an unofficial count, 27 athletes from 16 countries participated in the event.

- Austria (1)
- Bulgaria (1)
- Czechoslovakia (2)
- Denmark (1)
- France (2)
- Greece (2)
- Netherlands (1)
- Portugal (1)
- Romania (1)
- Soviet Union (3)
- Spain (1)
- Sweden (2)
- Switzerland (2)
- Great Britain (3)
- West Germany (3)
- Yugoslavia (1)
