= 1980 European Athletics Indoor Championships – Men's 400 metres =

400 metres foot race

The men's 400 metres event at the 1980 European Athletics Indoor Championships was held on 1 and 2 March in Sindelfingen.

== Medalists ==
Gold	Silver	Bronze
Nikolay Chernyetskiy; Soviet Union	Karel Kolář; Czechoslovakia	Remigijus Valiulis; Soviet Union

== Results ==
=== Heats ===
The winner of each heat (Q) and the next 3 fastest (q) qualified for the semifinals.

Rank	Heat	Name	Nationality	Time	Notes
1	4	Karel Kolář	Czechoslovakia	46.47	Q
2	3	Nikolay Chernyetskiy	Soviet Union	46.85	Q
3	4	Remigijus Valiulis	Soviet Union	47.00	q
4	3	Horia Toboc	Romania	47.07	q
5	2	Stefano Malinverni	Italy	47.17	Q
6	1	Christer Gullstrand	Sweden	47.28	Q
7	4	Alfonso Di Guida	Italy	47.36	q
8	4	Peter Haas	Switzerland	47.59	
9	2	Stavros Tziortzis	Greece	47.72	
10	3	Vladimir Ivanov	Bulgaria	47.80	
11	1	Benjamín González	Spain	47.94	
12	2	Wolfgang Richter	West Germany	47.95	
13	1	Rolf Gisler	Switzerland	47.99	
14	5	Viktor Burakov	Soviet Union	48.03	Q
15	2	Stein-Are Agledal	Norway	48.14	
16	5	József Szalai	Hungary	48.32	
17	5	Ludger Zander	West Germany	48.80	
18	1	Andreas Provelengios	Greece	48.95	
	5	Urs Kamber	Switzerland	DQ	

=== Semifinals ===
First 2 from each semifinal qualified directly (Q) for the final.

Rank	Heat	Name	Nationality	Time	Notes
1	1	Karel Kolář	Czechoslovakia	46.89	Q
2	2	Nikolay Chernyetskiy	Soviet Union	47.15	Q
3	1	Remigijus Valiulis	Soviet Union	47.17	Q
4	1	Viktor Burakov	Soviet Union	47.18	
5	2	Horia Toboc	Romania	47.47	Q
6	2	Christer Gullstrand	Sweden	47.62	
7	2	Alfonso Di Guida	Italy	47.97	
	1	Stefano Malinverni	Italy	DNF	

=== Final ===
Rank	Lane	Name	Nationality	Time	Notes
1st place, gold medalist(s)	4	Nikolay Chernyetskiy	Soviet Union	46.29	
2nd place, silver medalist(s)	2	Karel Kolář	Czechoslovakia	46.55	
3rd place, bronze medalist(s)	3	Remigijus Valiulis	Soviet Union	46.75	
4	1	Horia Toboc	Romania	46.95	
