= Athletics at the 1976 Summer Olympics – Men's 400 metres hurdles =

Men's 400 metres hurdles at the Games of the XXI Olympiad
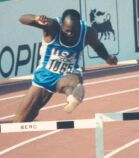
- Edwin Moses (1987)
- Venue: Olympic Stadium
- Dates: 23 July 1976 (quarterfinals); 24 July 1976 (semifinals); 25 July 1976 (final)
- Competitors: 22 from 16 nations
- Winning time: 47.64 WR

Medalists
1st place, gold medalist(s)		Edwin Moses; United States
2nd place, silver medalist(s)		Michael Shine; United States
3rd place, bronze medalist(s)		Yevgeniy Gavrilenko; Soviet Union

The men's 400 metres hurdles was an event at the 1976 Summer Olympics in Montreal. The competition was held from July 23, 1976, to July 25, 1976. There were 22 competitors from 16 nations. The maximum number of athletes per nation had been set at 3 since the 1930 Olympic Congress. American Edwin Moses won the final in a world record and Olympic record time of 47.64 seconds, winning by 1.05 seconds. His time was initially noted as one hundredth slower, but this was rounded up after an analysis of the photo finish. It was the United States' first victory in the event since 1964 and 12th overall. Fellow American Michael Shine took silver. Yevgeniy Gavrilenko earned the Soviet Union's first medal in the event since 1952 with his bronze. Great Britain's three-Games podium streak in the event ended.

== Background ==
This was the 16th time the event was held. It had been introduced along with the men's 200 metres hurdles in 1900, with the 200 being dropped after 1904 and the 400 being held through 1908 before being left off the 1912 programme. However, when the Olympics returned in 1920 after World War I, the men's 400 metres hurdles was back and would continue to be contested at every Games thereafter.

Two of the eight finalists from the 1972 Games returned: the joint sixth-place finishers Yevgeny Gavrilenko of the Soviet Union and Stavros Tziortzis of Greece. The favorite would have been reigning champion John Akii-Bua of Uganda, but the African boycott of the 1976 Games prevented him from competing. Without him, the field was relatively weak. European and Commonwealth champion Alan Pascoe of Great Britain was hampered by a leg injury. None of the Americans were particularly prominent; the United States team was led by Edwin Moses, a hurdler competing in his first international meet, though he would go on to become the preeminent athlete in the event.

Antigua and Barbuda, Bulgaria, Kuwait, and Saudi Arabia each made their debut in the event. The United States made its 16th appearance, the only nation to have competed at every edition of the event to that point.

== Competition format ==
The competition used the three-round format used every Games since 1908 (except the four-round competition in 1952): quarterfinals, semifinals, and a final. Ten sets of hurdles were set on the course. The hurdles were 3 feet (91.5 centimetres) tall and were placed 35 metres apart beginning 45 metres from the starting line, resulting in a 40 metres home stretch after the last hurdle. The 400 metres track was standard.

There were 4 quarterfinal heats with 5 or 6 athletes each. The top 4 men in each quarterfinal advanced to the semifinals. The 16 semifinalists were divided into 2 semifinals of 8 athletes each, with the top 4 in each semifinal advancing to the 8-man final.

== Records ==
These were the standing world and Olympic records (in seconds) prior to the 1976 Summer Olympics.

World record	John Akii-Bua (UGA)	47.82	Munich, West Germany	2 September 1972
Olympic record	John Akii-Bua (UGA)	47.82	Munich, West Germany	2 September 1972

Edwin Moses set a new world record in the final with a time of 47.64 seconds.

== Schedule ==
All times are Eastern Daylight Time (UTC-4)

Date	Time	Round
Friday, 23 July 1976	10:00	Quarterfinals
Saturday, 24 July 1976	15:00	Semifinals
Sunday, 25 July 1976	17:30	Final

== Results ==
=== Quarterfinals ===
The quarterfinals were held on July 23, 1976.

==== Quarterfinal 1 ====
Rank	Athlete	Nation	Time	Notes
1	Stavros Tziortzis	Greece	50.42	Q
2	Dámaso Alfonso	Cuba	50.76	Q
3	Jean-Claude Nallet	France	50.77	Q
4	José Carvalho	Portugal	50.99	Q
5	Don Hanly	Australia	51.90	

==== Quarterfinal 2 ====
Rank	Athlete	Nation	Time	Notes
1	Quentin Wheeler	United States	50.32	Q
2	Harald Schmid	West Germany	50.57	Q
3	Jean-Pierre Perrinelle	France	50.78	Q
3	Dmitry Stukalov	Soviet Union	50.78	Q
5	Peter Grant	Australia	51.07	

==== Quarterfinal 3 ====
Rank	Athlete	Nation	Time	Notes
1	Michael Shine	United States	50.91	Q
2	Yevgeniy Gavrilenko	Soviet Union	50.93	Q
3	Jerzy Hewelt	Poland	51.39	Q
4	Yanko Bratanov	Bulgaria	51.84	Q
5	Abdul Latif Youssef Hashem	Kuwait	53.06	
6	Conrad Mainwaring	Antigua and Barbuda	54.67	

==== Quarterfinal 4 ====
Rank	Athlete	Nation	Time	Notes
1	Edwin Moses	United States	49.95	Q
2	Alan Pascoe	Great Britain	51.66	Q
3	Georgios Parris	Greece	51.91	Q
4	Julio Ferrer	Puerto Rico	52.45	Q
5	Kamil Al-Abbasi	Saudi Arabia	55.00	
—	Jesús Villegas	Colombia	DNF	

=== Semifinals ===
The semifinals were held on July 24, 1976.

==== Semifinal 1 ====
Rank	Athlete	Nation	Time	Notes
1	Michael Shine	United States	49.90	Q
2	José Carvalho	Portugal	49.97	Q
3	Yanko Bratanov	Bulgaria	50.11	Q
4	Quentin Wheeler	United States	50.22	Q
5	Dmitry Stukalov	Soviet Union	50.47	
6	Jean-Pierre Perrinelle	France	50.82	
—	Georgios Parris	Greece	DNF	
—	Harald Schmid	West Germany	DSQ	

==== Semifinal 2 ====
Rank	Athlete	Nation	Time	Notes
1	Edwin Moses	United States	48.29	Q
2	Yevgeniy Gavrilenko	Soviet Union	49.73	Q
3	Dámaso Alfonso	Cuba	49.84	Q, PB
4	Alan Pascoe	Great Britain	49.95	Q
5	Jean-Claude Nallet	France	50.08	
6	Stavros Tziortzis	Greece	50.30	
7	Jerzy Hewelt	Poland	50.57	
8	Julio Ferrer	Puerto Rico	51.04	

=== Final ===
The final was held on July 25, 1976.

Rank	Athlete	Nation	Time	Notes
1st place, gold medalist(s)	Edwin Moses	United States	47.64	WR
2nd place, silver medalist(s)	Michael Shine	United States	48.69	
3rd place, bronze medalist(s)	Yevgeniy Gavrilenko	Soviet Union	49.45	
4	Quentin Wheeler	United States	49.86	
5	José Carvalho	Portugal	49.94	
6	Yanko Bratanov	Bulgaria	50.03	
7	Dámaso Alfonso	Cuba	50.19	
8	Alan Pascoe	Great Britain	51.29	

== Results summary ==
Rank	Athlete	Nation	Quarterfinals	Semifinals	Final	Notes
1st place, gold medalist(s)	Edwin Moses	United States	49.95	48.29	47.64	WR
2nd place, silver medalist(s)	Michael Shine	United States	50.91	49.90	48.69	
3rd place, bronze medalist(s)	Yevgeniy Gavrilenko	Soviet Union	50.93	49.73	49.45	
4	Quentin Wheeler	United States	50.32	50.22	49.86	
5	José Carvalho	Portugal	50.99	49.97	49.94	
6	Yanko Bratanov	Bulgaria	51.84	50.11	50.03	
7	Dámaso Alfonso	Cuba	50.76	49.84	50.19	
8	Alan Pascoe	Great Britain	51.66	49.95	51.29	
9	Jean-Claude Nallet	France	50.77	50.08	Did not advance	
10	Stavros Tziortzis	Greece	50.42	50.30	Did not advance	
11	Dmitry Stukalov	Soviet Union	50.78	50.47	Did not advance	
12	Jerzy Hewelt	Poland	51.39	50.57	Did not advance	
13	Jean-Pierre Perrinelle	France	50.78	50.82	Did not advance	
14	Julio Ferrer	Puerto Rico	52.45	51.04	Did not advance	
15	Georgios Parris	Greece	51.91	DNF	Did not advance	
15	Harald Schmid	West Germany	50.57	DSQ	Did not advance	
17	Peter Grant	Australia	51.07	Did not advance		
18	Don Hanly	Australia	51.90	Did not advance		
19	Abdul Latif Youssef Hashem	Kuwait	53.06	Did not advance		
20	Conrad Mainwaring	Antigua and Barbuda	54.67	Did not advance		
21	Kamil Al-Abbasi	Saudi Arabia	55.00	Did not advance		
22	Jesús Villegas	Colombia	DNF	Did not advance		
