= 1974 European Athletics Championships – Men's 400 metres hurdles =

Men's 400 metres hurdles at the European Athletics Championships

The men's 400 metres hurdles at the 1974 European Athletics Championships was held in Rome, Italy, at Stadio Olimpico on 3 and 4 September 1974.

== Medalists ==
Gold	Alan Pascoe; Great Britain
Silver	Jean-Claude Nallet; France
Bronze	Yevgeniy Gavrilenko; Soviet Union

== Results ==
=== Final ===
4 September

Rank	Name	Nationality	Time	Notes
1st place, gold medalist(s)	Alan Pascoe	Great Britain	48.82	CR
2nd place, silver medalist(s)	Jean-Claude Nallet	France	48.94	
3rd place, bronze medalist(s)	Yevgeniy Gavrilenko	Soviet Union	49.32	
4	Stavros Tziortzis	Greece	49.71	
5	Dmitriy Stukalov	Soviet Union	49.98	
6	Viktor Savchenko	Soviet Union	50.01	
7	Jerzy Hewelt	Poland	50.26	
8	Rolf Ziegler	West Germany	50.49	

=== Semi-finals ===
3 September

==== Semi-final 1 ====
Rank	Name	Nationality	Time	Notes
1	Dmitriy Stukalov	Soviet Union	49.67	Q
2	Alan Pascoe	Great Britain	49.77	Q
3	Stavros Tziortzis	Greece	49.79	Q
4	Rolf Ziegler	West Germany	49.87	Q
5	Miroslav Kodejš	Czechoslovakia	49.93	
6	François Aumas	Switzerland	50.46	
7	Yanko Bratanov	Bulgaria	50.66	NR
8	Jochen Mayer	East Germany	50.71	

==== Semi-final 2 ====
Rank	Name	Nationality	Time	Notes
1	Yevgeniy Gavrilenko	Soviet Union	49.63	Q
2	Jerzy Hewelt	Poland	49.79	NR Q
3	Jean-Claude Nallet	France	49.79	Q
4	Viktor Savchenko	Soviet Union	49.88	Q
5	Klaus Schönberger	East Germany	50.04	
6	Bill Hartley	Great Britain	50.55	
7	Frank Nusse	Netherlands	51.14	
8	Ivan Daniš	Czechoslovakia	53.28	

=== Heats ===
3 September

==== Heat 1 ====
Rank	Name	Nationality	Time	Notes
1	Miroslav Kodejš	Czechoslovakia	50.31	Q
2	Viktor Savchenko	Soviet Union	50.36	Q
3	Bill Hartley	Great Britain	50.42	Q
4	François Aumas	Switzerland	50.50	q
5	Yanko Bratanov	Bulgaria	51.02	q
6	Georgios Parris	Greece	51.44	
	Stefan Hallgrímsson	Iceland	DNS	

==== Heat 2 ====
Rank	Name	Nationality	Time	Notes
1	Dmitriy Stukalov	Soviet Union	50.48	Q
2	Jerzy Hewelt	Poland	50.54	Q
3	Klaus Schönberger	East Germany	50.60	Q
4	Frank Nusse	Netherlands	50.73	NR q
5	José Carvalho	Portugal	51.32	
6	Giorgio Ballati	Italy	51.47	

==== Heat 3 ====
Rank	Name	Nationality	Time	Notes
1	Jean-Claude Nallet	France	50.16	Q
2	Jochen Mayer	East Germany	50.88	Q
3	Ivan Daniš	Czechoslovakia	51.09	Q
4	Werner Reibert	West Germany	51.18	
5	Steve Black	Great Britain	51.19	
6	Yordan Yordanov	Bulgaria	52.05	
7	Gert Möller	Sweden	52.72	

==== Heat 4 ====
Rank	Name	Nationality	Time	Notes
1	Yevgeniy Gavrilenko	Soviet Union	50.28	Q
2	Rolf Ziegler	West Germany	50.35	Q
3	Alan Pascoe	Great Britain	50.54	Q
4	Stavros Tziortzis	Greece	50.65	q
5	Jan Struyk	Netherlands	51.83	
	István Árva	Hungary	DNS	

== Participation ==
According to an unofficial count, 24 athletes from 14 countries participated in the event.

- Bulgaria (2)
- Czechoslovakia (2)
- East Germany (2)
- France (1)
- Greece (2)
- Italy (1)
- Netherlands (2)
- Poland (1)
- Portugal (1)
- Soviet Union (3)
- Sweden (1)
- Switzerland (1)
- Great Britain (3)
- West Germany (2)
