= Athletics at the 1977 Summer Universiade – Men's 400 metres hurdles =

The men's 400 metres hurdles event at the 1977 Summer Universiade was held at the Vasil Levski National Stadium in Sofia on 21, 22 and 23 August.

== Medalists ==
Gold	Silver	Bronze
Tom Andrews; United States	Klaus Schönberger; East Germany	Rolf Ziegler; West Germany

== Results ==
=== Heats ===
Rank	Heat	Athlete	Nationality	Time	Notes
1	3	Rolf Ziegler	West Germany	50.30	Q
2	4	Vasiliy Arkhipenko	Soviet Union	50.37	Q
3	3	Tom Andrews	United States	50.46	Q
4	3	Talib Faizal Al-Saffar	Iraq	50.54	Q
5	3	Oleg Bulatkin	Soviet Union	50.62	q
6	4	Slavcho Dimitrov	Bulgaria	51.00	Q
7	1	Klaus Schönberger	East Germany	51.14	Q
8	1	James Walker	United States	51.27	Q
8	2	Ulli Zunker	West Germany	51.27	Q
10	1	Krzysztof Węglarski	Poland	51.33	Q
10	4	Dámaso Alfonso	Cuba	51.33	Q
12	1	Horia Toboc	Romania	51.60	q
13	4	David West	Great Britain	51.61	q
14	2	Paweł Łankiewicz	Poland	51.63	Q
15	2	Yanko Bratanov	Bulgaria	51.79	Q
16	2	Claude Anicet	France	52.09	q
17	4	Hiroyuki Oda	Japan	52.13	
18	3	Hansjörg Haas	Switzerland	52.25	
19	2	Takashi Nagao	Japan	52.35	
20	2	Enrique Aguirre	Mexico	52.53	
21	1	Luc Baggio	France	52.67	
22	4	Roberto Minetti	Italy	52.75	
23	4	Jean-Prosper Rajaonarison	Madagascar	53.58	
24	2	Clive Beattie	Great Britain	54.59	
25	1	Titus Kiboi	Kenya	58.22	

=== Semifinals ===
Rank	Heat	Athlete	Nationality	Time	Notes
1	2	Tom Andrews	United States	49.50	Q
2	2	Vasiliy Arkhipenko	Soviet Union	49.72	Q
3	2	Talib Faizal Al-Saffar	Iraq	49.95	Q, NR
4	2	Yanko Bratanov	Bulgaria	49.99	q
5	1	Klaus Schönberger	East Germany	50.07	Q
6	1	Rolf Ziegler	West Germany	50.24	Q
7	2	Ulli Zunker	West Germany	50.64	q
8	2	Krzysztof Węglarski	Poland	50.77	
9	1	James Walker	United States	50.92	Q
10	2	Dámaso Alfonso	Cuba	51.00	
11	1	Oleg Bulatkin	Soviet Union	51.09	
12	1	Slavcho Dimitrov	Bulgaria	51.15	
13	2	David West	Great Britain	51.56	
14	1	Horia Toboc	Romania	51.62	
15	1	Claude Anicet	France	51.68	
16	1	Paweł Łankiewicz	Poland	53.28	

=== Final ===
Rank	Athlete	Nationality	Time	Notes
1st place, gold medalist(s)	Tom Andrews	United States	49.52	
2nd place, silver medalist(s)	Klaus Schönberger	East Germany	49.55	
3rd place, bronze medalist(s)	Rolf Ziegler	West Germany	49.72	
4	Vasiliy Arkhipenko	Soviet Union	49.90	
5	Yanko Bratanov	Bulgaria	50.34	
6	Talib Faizal Al-Saffar	Iraq	50.53	
7	Ulli Zunker	West Germany	51.28	
	James Walker	United States	DQ	
