= Frank Montiéh =

Cuban hurdler

Frank Montiéh (born 19 November 1959) is a Cuban track and field hurdler who competed in the 400 metres hurdles. He was the 1983 Pan American Games champion in the event and also the 1982 Central American and Caribbean Games champion.

His first major international medal came at the 1977 Central American and Caribbean Championships in Athletics, where at the age of seventeen he was runner-up to fellow Cuban Dámaso Alfonso. He followed this with two bronze medals at the 1979 Pan American Games, finishing behind James Walker and Antônio Dias Ferreira in the hurdles before teaming up with Alberto Juantorena, Pedro Tanis, and Carlos Álvarez to take a 4 × 400 metres relay medal.

Montiéh ran a time of 50.59 seconds at the 1981 Central American and Caribbean Championships in Athletics, which would have been a championship record were it not for his compatriot Jorge Batista, who edged him by one hundredth of a second. The 1982 Central American and Caribbean Games were held on home turf in Havana, Cuba, and 22-year-old Montiéh finally ascended to the top of the regional scene with a win over Batista. This returned the title to Cuban hands, ending a twelve-year gap since Juan García's victory.

The 1983 season was the peak of Montiéh's career, but also his last at a high level. First came the 1983 Pan American Games held in Caracas, Venezuela. The 1975 400 m hurdles champion, James King, was among the entrants, as was the last edition's runner-up Ferreira of Brazil. Montiéh produced the performance of his lifetime with a run of 50.02 second in the final. This held off Ferreira by six hundredths of a second to claim the 400 m hurdles gold medal for Cuba – the nation's first in the history of the event since its inception in 1951. The final major appearance of his career was at the 1983 Ibero-American Championships in Athletics, at which he was the hurdles silver medallist behind Spain's José Alonso and a relay gold medallist with a Cuban team of Tomás Pedro González, Lázaro Martínez and Julio Osvaldo Prado.

== International competitions ==
Year	Competition	Venue	Position	Event	Notes
1977	CAC Championships	Xalapa, Mexico	2nd	400 m hurdles	51.81
1977	CAC Championships	Xalapa, Mexico	1st	4 × 400 m relay	3:09.24
1978	CAC Games	Medellín, Colombia	4th	400 m hurdles	51.00
1979	Pan American Games	San Juan, Puerto Rico	3rd	400 m hurdles	51.30
1979	Pan American Games	San Juan, Puerto Rico	3rd	4 × 400 m relay	3:06.3
1981	CAC Championships	Santo Domingo, Dominican Republic	2nd	400 m hurdles	50.59
1982	CAC Games	Havana, Cuba	1st	400 m hurdles	50.64
1983	Pan American Games	Caracas, Venezuela	1st	400 m hurdles	50.02
1983	Ibero-American Championships	Barcelona, Spain	2nd	400 m hurdles	50.81
1983	Ibero-American Championships	Barcelona, Spain	1st	4 × 400 m relay	3:07.05
