= 1979 European Athletics Indoor Championships – Men's 400 metres =

The men's 400 metres event at the 1979 European Athletics Indoor Championships was held on 24 and 25 February in Vienna.

== Medalists ==
Gold	Silver	Bronze
Karel Kolář; Czechoslovakia	Stefano Malinverni; Italy	Horia Toboc; Romania

== Results ==
=== Heats ===
First 2 from each heat (Q) and the next 2 fastest (q) qualified for the semifinals.

Rank	Heat	Name	Nationality	Time	Notes
1	1	Karel Kolář	Czechoslovakia	47.45	Q
2	2	Stefano Malinverni	Italy	47.51	Q
3	1	Horia Toboc	Romania	47.74	Q
4	2	Peter Haas	Switzerland	47.87	Q
5	3	Josip Alebić	Yugoslavia	47.90	Q
6	2	Željko Knapić	Yugoslavia	47.94	q
7	3	Michael Düsing	West Germany	47.96	Q
8	1	Alex Fortelny	Austria	48.00	q, PB
8	3	Isidoro Hornillos	Spain	48.00	q
10	3	Christer Gullstrand	Sweden	48.03	SB
11	2	Frank Richter	East Germany	48.08	PB
12	1	Urs Kamber	Switzerland	48.09	PB

=== Semifinals ===
The winner of each heat (Q) and the next 1 fastest (q) qualified for the final.

Rank	Heat	Name	Nationality	Time	Notes
1	1	Karel Kolář	Czechoslovakia	46.87	Q
2	1	Michael Düsing	West Germany	47.03	q
3	2	Stefano Malinverni	Italy	47.04	Q
4	2	Josip Alebić	Yugoslavia	47.15	PB
5	3	Horia Toboc	Romania	47.63	Q
6	3	Peter Haas	Switzerland	47.67	SB
7	1	Željko Knapić	Yugoslavia	47.72	SB
8	3	Isidoro Hornillos	Spain	47.84	PB
9	2	Alex Fortelny	Austria	48.63	

=== Final ===
Rank	Name	Nationality	Time	Notes
1st place, gold medalist(s)	Karel Kolář	Czechoslovakia	46.21	CR
2nd place, silver medalist(s)	Stefano Malinverni	Italy	46.59	PB
3rd place, bronze medalist(s)	Horia Toboc	Romania	46.86	PB
4	Michael Düsing	West Germany	46.95	PB
