= Athletics at the 1980 Summer Olympics – Men's 400 metres hurdles =

Men's 400 metres hurdles at the Games of the XXII Olympiad
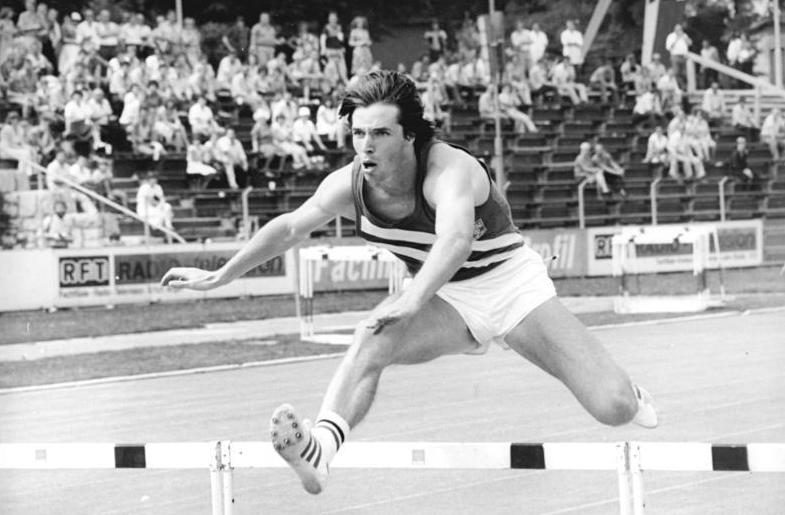
- Volker Beck (1981)
- Venue: Lenin Stadium
- Dates: 24–26 July
- Competitors: 22 from 19 nations
- Winning time: 48.70

Medalists
| 1st place, gold medalist(s) | | Volker Beck; East Germany |
| 2nd place, silver medalist(s) | | Vasyl Arkhypenko; Soviet Union |
| 3rd place, bronze medalist(s) | | Gary Oakes; Great Britain |

The men's 400 metres hurdles at the 1980 Summer Olympics in Moscow, Soviet Union had a start list of 22 competitors from 19 nations, with three quarterfinals (22 runners), two semifinals (16), and a final (8) that took place on Saturday July 26, 1980. The maximum number of athletes per nation had been set at 3 since the 1930 Olympic Congress. The event was won by Volker Beck of East Germany, the nation's first medal in the event. Vasyl Arkhypenko earned silver, the second consecutive Games that the Soviet Union reached the podium in the event. Gary Oakes put Great Britain back on the podium after a one-Games absence with his bronze.

== Background ==
This was the 17th time the event was held. It had been introduced along with the men's 200 metres hurdles in 1900, with the 200 being dropped after 1904 and the 400 being held through 1908 before being left off the 1912 programme. However, when the Olympics returned in 1920 after World War I, the men's 400 metres hurdles was back and would continue to be contested at every Games thereafter.

One of the eight finalists from the 1976 Games returned: sixth-place finisher Yanko Bratanov of Bulgaria. Also returning was 1972 gold medalist John Akii-Bua of Uganda, who had not competed in 1976 due to the African boycott. The overwhelming favorite would have been reigning champion Edwin Moses of the United States, but he (along with his biggest challenger, European champion Harald Schmid of West Germany) were absent from Moscow due to the American-led boycott.

Botswana, Nicaragua, Syria, and Zambia each made their debut in the event. Great Britain made its 15th appearance, most of any competing nation but behind the United States' 16; this was the first time the Americans did not compete in the event.

== Competition format ==
The competition used the three-round format used every Games since 1908 (except the four-round competition in 1952): quarterfinals, semifinals, and a final. Ten sets of hurdles were set on the course. The hurdles were 3 feet (91.5 centimetres) tall and were placed 35 metres apart beginning 45 metres from the starting line, resulting in a 40 metres home stretch after the last hurdle. The 400 metres track was standard.

There were 3 quarterfinal heats with 7 or 8 athletes each. The top 4 men in each quarterfinal advanced to the semifinals along with the next fastest 4 overall. The 16 semifinalists were divided into 2 semifinals of 8 athletes each, with the top 3 in each semifinal, and the next 2 fastest overall, advancing to the 8-man final.

== Records ==
These were the standing world and Olympic records (in seconds) prior to the 1980 Summer Olympics.

| World record | Edwin Moses (USA) | 47.13 | Milan, Italy | 3 July 1980 |
| Olympic record | Edwin Moses (USA) | 47.64 | Montreal, Canada | 25 July 1976 |

No new world or Olympic records were set during the competition.

== Schedule ==
All times are Moscow Time (UTC+3)

| Date | Time | Round |
|---|---|---|
| Thursday, 24 July 1980 | 10:15 | Quarterfinals |
| Friday, 25 July 1980 | 17:10 | Semifinals |
| Saturday, 26 July 1980 | 19:55 | Final |

== Results ==
=== Quarterfinals ===
The quarterfinals were held on Thursday, 24 July 1980.

==== Quarterfinal 1 ====
| Rank | Athlete | Nation | Time | Notes |
|---|---|---|---|---|
| 1 | Nikolay Vasilyev | Soviet Union | 50.09 | Q |
| 2 | Antônio Dias Ferreira | Brazil | 50.14 | Q |
| 3 | Volker Beck | East Germany | 50.35 | Q |
| 4 | Ryszard Szparak | Poland | 50.45 | Q |
| 5 | John Akii-Bua | Uganda | 50.87 | q |
| 6 | Horia Toboc | Romania | 50.89 | q |
| 7 | Davison Lishebo | Zambia | 51.73 | |

==== Quarterfinal 2 ====
| Rank | Athlete | Nation | Time | Notes |
|---|---|---|---|---|
| 1 | Harry Schulting | Netherlands | 50.01 | Q |
| 2 | József Szalai | Hungary | 50.23 | Q |
| 3 | Gary Oakes | Great Britain | 50.39 | Q |
| 4 | Aleksandr Kharlov | Soviet Union | 50.79 | Q |
| 5 | José Casabona | Spain | 51.26 | |
| — | Wilfred Kareng | Botswana | DNF | |
| — | Leonel Teller | Nicaragua | DNF | |
| — | Ali Hassan Kadhum | Iraq | DNS | |

==== Quarterfinal 3 ====
| Rank | Athlete | Nation | Time | Notes |
|---|---|---|---|---|
| 1 | Vasyl Arkhypenko | Soviet Union | 50.22 | Q |
| 2 | Franz Meier | Switzerland | 50.32 | Q |
| 3 | Rok Kopitar | Yugoslavia | 50.34 | Q |
| 4 | Juan Lloveras | Spain | 50.48 | Q |
| 5 | Yanko Bratanov | Bulgaria | 50.56 | q |
| 6 | Christer Gullstrand | Sweden | 50.95 | q |
| 7 | Amer Maaraoui | Syria | 53.26 | |
| 8 | Abdultif Hashem | Kuwait | 53.31 | |

=== Semifinals ===
The semifinals were held on Friday, 25 July 1980.

==== Semifinal 1 ====
| Rank | Athlete | Nation | Time | Notes |
|---|---|---|---|---|
| 1 | Volker Beck | East Germany | 50.36 | Q |
| 2 | Rok Kopitar | Yugoslavia | 50.55 | Q |
| 3 | Horia Toboc | Romania | 50.58 | Q |
| 4 | Harry Schulting | Netherlands | 50.61 | |
| 5 | Aleksandr Kharlov | Soviet Union | 50.64 | |
| 6 | József Szalai | Hungary | 51.06 | |
| 7 | Antônio Dias Ferreira | Brazil | 52.31 | |
| — | Christer Gullstrand | Sweden | DNS | |

==== Semifinal 2 ====
| Rank | Athlete | Nation | Time | Notes |
|---|---|---|---|---|
| 1 | Vasyl Arkhypenko | Soviet Union | 49.80 | Q |
| 2 | Nikolay Vasilyev | Soviet Union | 49.87 | Q |
| 3 | Gary Oakes | Great Britain | 50.07 | Q |
| 4 | Franz Meier | Switzerland | 50.12 | q |
| 5 | Yanko Bratanov | Bulgaria | 50.17 | q |
| 6 | Ryszard Szparak | Poland | 50.41 | |
| 7 | John Akii-Bua | Uganda | 51.10 | |
| 8 | Juan Lloveras | Spain | 51.86 | |

=== Final ===
| Rank | Athlete | Nation | Time |
|---|---|---|---|
| 1st place, gold medalist(s) | Volker Beck | East Germany | 48.70 |
| 2nd place, silver medalist(s) | Vasyl Arkhypenko | Soviet Union | 48.86 |
| 3rd place, bronze medalist(s) | Gary Oakes | Great Britain | 49.11 |
| 4 | Nikolay Vasilyev | Soviet Union | 49.34 |
| 5 | Rok Kopitar | Yugoslavia | 49.67 |
| 6 | Horia Toboc | Romania | 49.84 |
| 7 | Franz Meier | Switzerland | 50.00 |
| 8 | Yanko Bratanov | Bulgaria | 56.35 |

== Results summary ==
| Rank | Athlete | Nation | Quarterfinals | Semifinals | Final |
|---|---|---|---|---|---|
| 1st place, gold medalist(s) | Volker Beck | East Germany | 50.35 | 50.36 | 48.70 |
| 2nd place, silver medalist(s) | Vasyl Arkhypenko | Soviet Union | 50.22 | 49.80 | 48.86 |
| 3rd place, bronze medalist(s) | Gary Oakes | Great Britain | 50.39 | 50.07 | 49.11 |
| 4 | Nikolay Vasilyev | Soviet Union | 50.09 | 49.87 | 49.34 |
| 5 | Rok Kopitar | Yugoslavia | 50.34 | 50.55 | 49.67 |
| 6 | Horia Toboc | Romania | 50.89 | 50.58 | 49.84 |
| 7 | Franz Meier | Switzerland | 50.32 | 50.12 | 50.00 |
| 8 | Yanko Bratanov | Bulgaria | 50.56 | 50.17 | 56.35 |
| 9 | Ryszard Szparak | Poland | 50.45 | 50.41 | Did not advance |
| 10 | Harry Schulting | Netherlands | 50.01 | 50.61 | Did not advance |
| 11 | Aleksandr Kharlov | Soviet Union | 50.79 | 50.64 | Did not advance |
| 12 | József Szalai | Hungary | 50.23 | 51.06 | Did not advance |
| 13 | John Akii-Bua | Uganda | 50.87 | 51.10 | Did not advance |
| 14 | Juan Lloveras | Spain | 50.48 | 51.86 | Did not advance |
| 15 | Antônio Dias Ferreira | Brazil | 50.14 | 52.31 | Did not advance |
| 16 | Christer Gullstrand | Sweden | 50.95 | DNS | Did not advance |
| 17 | José Casabona | Spain | 51.26 | Did not advance | |
| 18 | Davison Lishebo | Zambia | 51.73 | Did not advance | |
| 19 | Amer Maaraoui | Syria | 53.26 | Did not advance | |
| 20 | Abdultif Hashem | Kuwait | 53.31 | Did not advance | |
| 21 | Wilfred Kareng | Botswana | DNF | Did not advance | |
| 21 | Leonel Teller | Nicaragua | DNF | Did not advance | |
| — | Ali Hassan Kadhum | Iraq | DNS | Did not advance | |

== See also ==
- 1982 Men's European Championships 400m Hurdles (Athens)
- 1983 Men's World Championships 400m Hurdles (Helsinki)
