= Jim Bolding =

American track and field athlete

Personal information
- Nationality: American
- Born: November 3, 1949 Tulsa, Oklahoma, United States
- Died: July 31, 2011 (aged 61) Stillwater, Oklahoma, United States

Sport
- Sport: Athletics
- Event: hurdles

James Doyle Bolding, II (November 3, 1949 – July 31, 2011) was an American track and field athlete, primarily known for the 400 metres hurdles.

He was the current world record holder in the now rarely run 440-yard hurdles, the predecessor to the current 400 metre hurdles (the 440 yard event is 2.336m, or seven feet eight inches, longer in distance).

Over the more conventional 400 hurdles, Bolding was ranked in the top ten in the world 5 times from 1972 to 1976, achieving the #1 ranking in 1974 and trailing only the reigning Olympic champion and world record holder John Akii-Bua. In 1974 he was named United States Olympic Committee "Male Athlete of the Year."

== Biography ==
Bolding was born in Tulsa, Oklahoma, and was a 1968 graduate of U. S. Grant High School in Oklahoma City. He then went to Oklahoma State University where he won two NCAA Championships. Bolding was 6th at the 1972 Olympic Trials while still in college. Between Olympics he was the U.S. National Champion in 1973 (440 yard hurdles) and 1974 (400 metres hurdles).

In 1974, on tour, he also won the French national championship In Italy on the 24 July, Bolding set a world record at the 440 yard hurdles of 48.7s. and won the British AAA Championships title at the 1974 AAA Championships. At the end of the season, he was on the August 1974 cover of Track and Field News captioned "Bolding Burns Barriers."

In the 1976 Olympic Trials, he was in the lead at the halfway point going into a strong wind on the backstretch, but was passed by upstart Edwin Moses around the turn. Maintaining second until over the last hurdle, he "almost crumpled" and was passed by Mike Shine and a fast closing Quentin Wheeler into a non-qualifying fourth place. Moses and Shine would finish 1–2 in the Olympics.

Between 1985 and 1988, Bolding was track coach at Oklahoma State University. He returned as a volunteer coach in 2004 whilst also the owner of a travel agency.

Bolding died, aged 61, in Stillwater, Oklahoma. He is a member of both the Oklahoma Sports Hall of Fame (elected posthumously in2011) and the Oklahoma State University Hall of Fame (elected 2000).

== Rankings ==
Bolding was ranked among the best in the US and the world in the 400 m hurdles from 1971 to 1976, according to the votes of the experts of Track and Field News.

400 meters hurdles
Year	World rank	US rank
1971	-	6th
1972	9th	5th
1973	2nd	1st
1974	1st	1st
1975	3rd	1st
1976	3rd	3rd

Awards
Preceded by (Uganda) John Akii-Bua	Men's 400 m Hurdles Best Year Performance; 1974-1975	Succeeded by (United States) Edwin Moses
