= 1976 European Athletics Indoor Championships – Men's 400 metres =

The men's 400 metres event at the 1976 European Athletics Indoor Championships was held on 21 and 22 February in Munich.

== Medalists ==
Gold	Silver	Bronze
Yanko Bratanov; Bulgaria	Hermann Köhler; West Germany	Grzegorz Mądry; Poland

== Results ==
=== Heats ===
First 2 from each heat (Q) and the next 2 fastest (q) qualified for the semifinals.

Rank	Heat	Name	Nationality	Time	Notes
1	1	Stavros Tziortzis	Greece	48.12	Q
2	3	Josip Alebić	Yugoslavia	48.23	Q
3	3	Hermann Köhler	West Germany	48.45	Q
4	3	Yanko Bratanov	Bulgaria	48.45	q
5	1	Ludger Zander	West Germany	48.53	Q
6	1	Nándor Hornyacsek	Hungary	48.66	q
7	1	Waldemar Szlendak	Poland	49.06	
8	2	Grzegorz Mądry	Poland	49.36	Q
9	2	Harald Schmid	West Germany	49.72	Q
10	2	Christian Jackiel	France	50.15	

=== Semifinals ===
First 2 from each heat (Q) qualified directly for the final.

Rank	Heat	Name	Nationality	Time	Notes
1	1	Stavros Tziortzis	Greece	47.62	Q
2	1	Yanko Bratanov	Bulgaria	47.91	Q
2	2	Hermann Köhler	West Germany	47.91	Q
4	1	Harald Schmid	West Germany	47.98	
4	2	Grzegorz Mądry	Poland	47.98	Q
6	1	Ludger Zander	West Germany	48.82	
7	2	Nándor Hornyacsek	Hungary	49.07	
8	2	Josip Alebić	Yugoslavia	49.31	

=== Final ===
Rank	Name	Nationality	Time	Notes
1st place, gold medalist(s)	Yanko Bratanov	Bulgaria	47.79	
2nd place, silver medalist(s)	Hermann Köhler	West Germany	48.19	
3rd place, bronze medalist(s)	Grzegorz Mądry	Poland	48.46	
4	Stavros Tziortzis	Greece	48.51	
