= Athletics at the 1979 Pan American Games – Men's 400 metres hurdles =

Men's 400 metres hurdles at the 1979 Pan American Games
- Venue: Estadio Sixto Escobar
- Winning time: 49.66

Medalists
Gold medal	James Walker	United States
Silver medal	Antônio Dias Ferreira	Brazil
Bronze medal	Frank Montiéh	Cuba

The men's 400 metres hurdles sprint competition of the athletics events at the 1979 Pan American Games took place at the Estadio Sixto Escobar. The defending Pan American Games champion was James King of the United States America.

== Records ==
Prior to this competition, the existing world and Pan American Games records were as follows:

World record	Edwin Moses (USA)	47.00	Los Angeles, United States	June 11, 1977
Pan American Games record	Ralph Mann (USA)	49.10	Cali, Colombia	1971

== Results ==
KEY:	WR	World Record	GR	Pan American Record

=== Heats ===
Rank	Heat	Name	Nationality	Time	Notes
1	2	James Walker	United States	51.28	Q
2	1	Antônio Dias Ferreira	Brazil	51.71	Q
3	2	Frank Montiéh	Cuba	51.73	Q
4	1	Ian Newhouse	Canada	52.38	Q
5	1	Alexis Misignak	Cuba	52.45	Q
6	2	Donizete Soares	Brazil	52.70	Q
7	1	Carlos Yambot	Puerto Rico	53.32	q
8	2	Julio Ferrer	Puerto Rico	53.46	q
9	2	Alfredo Piza	Chile	53.64	
10	1	Alfredo Edwards	Chile	54.41	
	1	Rafael Echevarría	Mexico	DQ	

=== Final ===
Held on 8 July

Rank	Name	Nationality	Time	Notes
1st place, gold medalist(s)	James Walker	United States	49.66	
2nd place, silver medalist(s)	Antônio Dias Ferreira	Brazil	50.85	
3rd place, bronze medalist(s)	Frank Montiéh	Cuba	51.30	
4	Julio Ferrer	Puerto Rico	51.48	
5	Ian Newhouse	Canada	51.58	
6	Donizete Soares	Brazil	51.72	
7	Carlos Yambot	Puerto Rico	51.76	
8	Alexis Misignak	Cuba	53.08	
