= Athletics at the 1979 Pan American Games – Men's 4 × 400 metres relay =

Men's 4 × 400 metres relay at the 1979 Pan American Games
- Venue: Estadio Sixto Escobar
- Dates: 13 & 14 July
- Winning time: 3:03.8

Medalists
Gold medal	James Walker, Herman Frazier, Maurice Peoples, Tony Darden	United States
Silver medal	Ian Stapleton, Floyd Brown, Bert Cameron, Colin Bradford	Jamaica
Bronze medal	Frank Montiéh, Carlos Álvarez, Alberto Juantorena, Pedro Tanis	Cuba

The men's 4 × 400 metres relay competition of the athletics events at the 1979 Pan American Games took place on 13 and 14 July at the Estadio Sixto Escobar. The defending Pan American Games champion was the United States team.

== Records ==
Prior to this competition, the existing world and Pan American Games records were as follows:

World record	United States	2:56.16	Mexico City, Mexico	October 20, 1968
Pan American Games record	United States	3:00.60	Cali, Colombia	1971

== Results ==
KEY:	WR	World Record	GR	Pan American Record

=== Heats ===
Rank	Heat	Nation	Competitors	Time	Notes
1	1	United States	James Walker, Herman Frazier, Maurice Peoples, Tony Darden	3:06.4	Q
2	1	Trinidad and Tobago	Michael Solomon, Raffer Mahammed, Joseph Coombs, Willie Alexander	3:09.3	Q
3	1	Canada	Dough Hinds, Frank van Doorn, Glenn Bogue, Bryan Saunders	3:10.1	Q
4	2	Jamaica	Ian Stapleton, Floyd Brown, Bert Cameron, Colin Bradford	3:10.15	Q
5	1	Antigua and Barbuda	Lester Flax, Elroy Turner, Fred Sowerby, Paul Richards	3:12.4	q
6	2	Brazil	Donizete Soares, Geraldo José Pegado, Delmo da Silva, Antônio Dias Ferreira	3:14.51	Q
7	2	Cuba	Frank Montiéh, Carlos Álvarez, Alberto Juantorena, Pedro Tanis	3:15.5	Q
8	1	Dominican Republic	Francisco Solis, Anatalio Ramírez, Gil Fortuna, Rafael Félix	3:15.7	q
	2	Puerto Rico	Víctor Ramos, Gustavo Rivera, Carlos Yambot, Julio Ferrer	DQ	

=== Final ===
Rank	Nation	Competitors	Time	Notes
1st place, gold medalist(s)	United States	James Walker, Herman Frazier, Maurice Peoples, Tony Darden	3:03.8	
2nd place, silver medalist(s)	Jamaica	Ian Stapleton, Floyd Brown, Bert Cameron, Colin Bradford	3:04.7	
3rd place, bronze medalist(s)	Cuba	Frank Montiéh, Carlos Álvarez, Alberto Juantorena, Pedro Tanis	3:06.3	
4	Canada	Dough Hinds, Frank van Doorn, Glenn Bogue, Bryan Saunders	3:09.2	
5	Brazil	Donizete Soares, Geraldo José Pegado, Delmo da Silva, Antônio Dias Ferreira	3:10.9	
6	Trinidad and Tobago	Michael Solomon, Raffer Mahammed, Joseph Coombs, Willie Alexander	3:11.6	
7	Dominican Republic	Francisco Solis, Anatalio Ramírez, Gil Fortuna, Rafael Félix	3:14.1	
8	Antigua and Barbuda	Lester Flax, Elroy Turner, Fred Sowerby, Paul Richards	3:14.6	
