= Masters M35 400 metres hurdles world record progression =

This is the progression of world record improvements of the 400 metres hurdles M35 division of Masters athletics.

Key

Incomplete information Pending

Hand	Auto	Athlete	Nationality	Birthdate	Age	Location	Date	Ref
	48.10	Félix Sánchez	Dominican Republic	30 August 1977	35 years, 348 days	Moscow	13 August 2013	
	48.13	Danny McFarlane	Jamaica	14 February 1972	37 years, 164 days	Monaco	28 July 2009	
	48.93	Nathaniel Page	United States	26 January 1957	35 years, 166 days	London	10 July 1992	
	49.72	James King	United States	9 May 1949	35 years, 4 days	Los Angeles	13 May 1984	
	51.72	Bertil Wistam	Sweden	28 June 1940	35 years, 19 days	Stockholm	17 July 1975	
	52.61	Corrado Montoneri	Italy	14 March 1939	35 years, 140 days	Rome	1 August 1974	
53.3 h		Luigi Facelli	Italy	10 May 1898	35 years, 59 days	London	8 July 1933	
