= Athletics at the 1983 Pan American Games – Men's 400 metres hurdles =

Men's 400 metres hurdles at the Pan American Games

The men's 400 metres hurdles event at the 1983 Pan American Games was held in Caracas, Venezuela on 23 and 24 August.

== Medalists ==
Gold	Silver	Bronze
Frank Montiéh; Cuba	Antônio Dias Ferreira; Brazil	James King; United States

== Results ==
=== Heats ===
Rank	Heat	Name	Nationality	Time	Notes
1	1	James King	United States	50.25	Q
2	1	Oswaldo Zea	Venezuela	50.88	Q
3	1	Frank Montiéh	Cuba	50.89	Q
4	1	Lloyd Guss	Canada	51.89	q
5	2	Ian Newhouse	Canada	52.13	Q
6	2	Julio Ferrer	Puerto Rico	53.65	Q
7	2	Antônio Dias Ferreira	Brazil	53.97	Q
8	1	Javier Olivar	Uruguay	54.21	q
	2	Mark Patrick	United States	DNS	

=== Final ===
Rank	Name	Nationality	Time	Notes
1st place, gold medalist(s)	Frank Montiéh	Cuba	50.02	
2nd place, silver medalist(s)	Antônio Dias Ferreira	Brazil	50.08	
3rd place, bronze medalist(s)	James King	United States	50.31	
4	Ian Newhouse	Canada	50.66	
5	Oswaldo Zea	Venezuela	50.85	
6	Lloyd Guss	Canada	51.50	
7	Julio Ferrer	Puerto Rico	51.94	
8	Javier Olivar	Uruguay	53.96	
