= Athletics at the 1981 Summer Universiade – Men's 400 metres hurdles =

The men's 400 metres hurdles event at the 1981 Summer Universiade was held at the Stadionul Naţional in Bucharest on 21 and 22 July 1981.

== Medalists ==
Gold	Silver	Bronze
David Lee; United States	Dmitriy Shkarupin; Soviet Union	Antônio Dias Ferreira; Brazil

== Results ==
=== Heats ===
Held on 21 July

Rank	Heat	Athlete	Nationality	Time	Notes
1	4	David Lee	United States	50.47	Q
2	1	Hugo Pont	Netherlands	50.71	Q
3	1	Krzysztof Węglarski	Poland	50.87	Q
4	1	Nikolay Vasilyev	Soviet Union	50.95	Q
5	1	Dumitru Iacob	Romania	50.98	q
6	4	Carlos Azulay	Spain	51.27	Q
7	2	Frank Czioska	West Germany	51.38	Q
8	3	Antônio Dias Ferreira	Brazil	51.43	Q
9	3	David Patrick	United States	51.44	Q
10	2	Dmitriy Shkarupin	Soviet Union	51.58	Q
11	1	Takashi Nagao	Japan	51.67	q
12	2	Ian Newhouse	Canada	51.67	Q
13	3	José Casabona	Spain	51.73	Q
14	2	Jorge Batista	Cuba	51.81	q
15	4	Shigenobu Omori	Japan	51.84	Q
16	1	Carlo Putetto	Italy	51.96	q
17	3	Riccardo Trevisan	Italy	52.09	
18	4	Jacek Birek	Poland	52.20	
19	3	Iosif Korodi	Romania	52.25	
20	2	Peter Paulinyi	Hungary	52.29	
21	4	Jean-Claude Curtil	France	52.51	
22	3	Wolfgang Richter	West Germany	52.78	
23	3	Rafael Echavarría	Mexico	53.02	
24	2	Lars-Åke Welander	Sweden	53.11	
25	4	Marc Eyckmans	Belgium	53.77	
26	4	Nasir Sati	Iraq	55.70	

=== Semifinals ===
Held on 22 July

Rank	Heat	Athlete	Nationality	Time	Notes
1	2	Dmitriy Shkarupin	Soviet Union	50.31	Q
2	2	Hugo Pont	Netherlands	50.51	Q
3	2	Frank Czioska	West Germany	50.53	Q
4	1	David Lee	United States	50.70	Q
5	2	David Patrick	United States	50.86	q
6	1	Antônio Dias Ferreira	Brazil	51.10	Q
7	2	Takashi Nagao	Japan	51.37	q
8	1	Nikolay Vasilyev	Soviet Union	51.41	Q
9	1	José Casabona	Spain	51.50	
10	2	Carlos Azulay	Spain	51.62	
11	1	Dumitru Iacob	Romania	51.66	
12	1	Shigenobu Omori	Japan	51.73	
13	2	Jorge Batista	Cuba	52.08	
14	2	Krzysztof Węglarski	Poland	52.14	
15	1	Ian Newhouse	Canada	52.85	
16	1	Carlo Putetto	Italy	1:02.23	

=== Final ===
Held on 22 July

Rank	Athlete	Nationality	Time	Notes
1st place, gold medalist(s)	David Lee	United States	49.05	
2nd place, silver medalist(s)	Dmitriy Shkarupin	Soviet Union	49.52	
3rd place, bronze medalist(s)	Antônio Dias Ferreira	Brazil	50.04	
4	Nikolay Vasilyev	Soviet Union	50.11	
5	David Patrick	United States	50.40	
6	Frank Czioska	West Germany	50.84	
7	Takashi Nagao	Japan	51.69	
	Hugo Pont	Netherlands	DNS	
