= 1975 European Athletics Indoor Championships – Men's 4 × 320 metres relay =

The men's 4 × 320 metres relay event at the 1975 European Athletics Indoor Championships was held on 8 March in Katowice. The athletes ran two laps for each leg, like in modern indoor relay races, but because the track was only 160 metres long, it resulted in an unusual distance of 320 metres for each runner.

== Results ==
Rank	Nation	Competitors	Time	Notes
1st place, gold medalist(s)	West Germany	Klaus Ehl; Franz-Peter Hofmeister; Karl Honz; Hermann Köhler	2:29.9	
2nd place, silver medalist(s)	Poland	Wiesław Puchalski; Roman Siedlecki; Jerzy Włodarczyk; Wojciech Romanowski	2:31.4	
3rd place, bronze medalist(s)	Bulgaria	Krassimir Gutev; Narzis Popov; Yordan Yordanov; Yanko Bratanov	2:32.1	
