= Peter Lineham =

New Zealand historian specialising in religious history

Peter Lineham MNZM
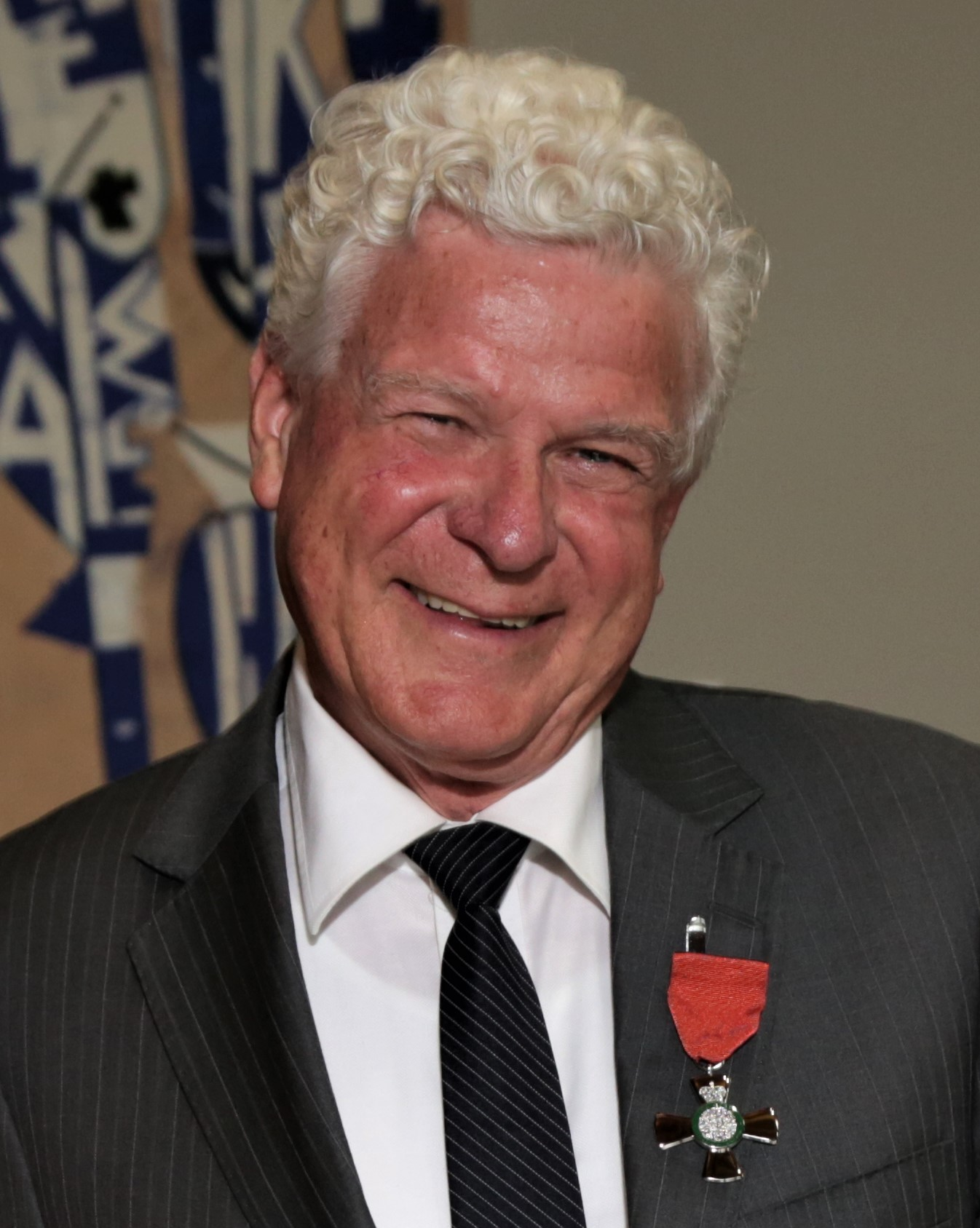
- Lineham in 2019
- Born: Peter James Lineham; 1 December 1951 (age 74); Karamea, New Zealand

Academic background
- Education: University of Sussex
- Thesis: The English Swedenborgians, 1770–1840: a study in the social dimensions of religious sectarianism (1978)
- Doctoral advisor: J. F. C. Harrison

Academic work
- Discipline: Religious history
- Institutions: Massey University

Peter James Lineham MNZM (born 1 December 1951) is a New Zealand historian specialising in religious history. His early research focused on 18th- and 19th-century British Protestant sects.

== Early life and education ==
Lineham was born at Karamea on 1 December 1951, the son of Ethelwyn and Alf Lineham. He was raised in a Brethren family of five boys, initially in Karamea, and then in Christchurch.

Lineham was educated at Burnside High School, and went on to study at the University of Canterbury, graduating with a Bachelor of Arts degree in 1973, and a Master of Arts degree in history with first-class honours two years later. His master's thesis was titled The campaign to abolish imprisonment for debt in England, 1750–1840. He was awarded a Commonwealth Scholarship in 1975, and undertook doctoral studies at the University of Sussex, supervised by J. F. C. Harrison. His research on the followers of the 18th-century Swedish scientist and theologian Emanuel Swedenborg led to his 1978 PhD thesis, The English Swedenborgians, 1770–1840: a study in the social dimensions of religious sectarianism.

In 1989, Lineham graduated from the University of Otago with a Bachelor of Divinity degree.

== Career ==
Lineham's early independent publication, There We Found Brethren (1977), explored the development of Brethren assemblies in New Zealand, marking a foundational contribution to the field. He has undertaken research on new religious movements, and the histories of the Brethren, Protestantism, evangelicalism, and Anglicanism in New Zealand.

Lineham has been a regular media commentator on religious matters in New Zealand. He contributed numerous entries to the Dictionary of New Zealand Biography and led its religion and church people working group for over a decade.

He is emeritus professor of history at Massey University, having taught there for 40 years, retiring in 2019.

== Honours and awards ==
In the 2019 New Year Honours, Lineham was appointed a Member of the New Zealand Order of Merit, for services to religious history and the community.

== Selected publications ==
Lineham has had numerous works published including the following books:

- There We Found Brethren: a history of assemblies of brethren in New Zealand
- Religious history of New Zealand: A bibliography
- Transplanted Christianity: Documents illustrating aspects of New Zealand Church History
- Scholarship and Fierce Sincerity (2006)
- Bible & society: A sesquicentennial history of the Bible Society in New Zealand
- Where the road runs out: research essays on the ecumenical journey and the Conference of Churches in Aotearoa New Zealand (2005)
- Destiny: the Life and Times of a Self-made Apostle (Penguin, 2013)
- Sunday Best: How the church shaped New Zealand and New Zealand shaped the church
- Agency of Hope: The story of the Auckland City Mission 1920–2020
- Weteriana Methodism: Bicentennial Reflections from Aotearoa New Zealand
