= József Szalai =

József Szalai may refer to:

- József Szalai (footballer) (born 2002), Hungarian footballer
- József Szalai (gymnast) (1892–1990), Hungarian gymnast
- József Szalai (hurdler) (born 1961), Hungarian hurdler
