= Viktor Savchenko =

Viktor Savchenko may refer to:

- Viktor Savchenko (hurdler) (Viktor Grigoryevich Savchenko, born 1948), Ukrainian Olympic hurdler
- Viktor Savchenko (boxer) (Viktor Grigorievich Savchenko, born 1952), Ukrainian amateur middleweight boxer
- Victor A. Savchenko (Viktor Anatolyevich Savchenko, born 1961), Ukrainian historian
