= Masters M35 400 metres world record progression =

This is the progression of world record improvements of the 400 metres M35 division of Masters athletics.

Key

Incomplete information Pending

Hand	Auto	Athlete	Nationality	Birthdate	Location	Date
	44.54	Chris Brown	Bahamas	15.10.1978	Eugene	30.05.2015
	44.59	Chris Brown	Bahamas	15.10.1978	Lausanne	03.07.2014
	45.68	Alvin Harrison	Dominican Republic	20.01.1974	Santo Domingo	03.04.2009
	45.76	Ibrahima Wade	France	06.09.1968	Saint Denis	23.07.2004
	45.81	Timothy Munnings	Bahamas	22.06.1966	Nassau	23.06.2001
	46.39	James King	United States	09.05.1949	San Diego	25.05.1984
	46.91	Hugues Roger	France	21.10.1940	Villeneuve d'Ascq	27.06.1976
47.9		Uwe Lenz	Germany	05.05.1940	Frankfurt	13.07.1975
47.9		Jerry Cyrus	South Africa	24.05.1932	Port Elizabeth	06.03.1968
48.3		Dennis Shore	South Africa	24.05.1915	Pretoria	23.09.1950
