= 1975 European Athletics Indoor Championships – Men's 400 metres =

The men's 400 metres event at the 1975 European Athletics Indoor Championships was held on 8 and 9 March in Katowice.

== Medalists ==
Gold	Silver	Bronze
Hermann Köhler; West Germany	Josip Alebić; Yugoslavia	Semyon Kocher; Soviet Union

== Results ==
=== Heats ===
Held on 8 March.
First 2 from each heat (Q) and the next 2 fastest (q) qualified for the semifinals.

Rank	Heat	Name	Nationality	Time	Notes
1	3	Alfons Brijdenbach	Belgium	48.47	Q
2	1	Semyon Kocher	Soviet Union	48.55	Q
3	1	Stavros Tziortzis	Greece	48.69	Q
4	2	Hermann Köhler	West Germany	48.88	Q
5	3	Josip Alebić	Yugoslavia	49.00	Q
6	3	Michael Fredriksson	Sweden	49.00	q
7	1	Ossi Karttunen	Finland	49.30	q
8	2	Józef Laskowski	Poland	49.46	Q
9	2	Flavio Borghi	Italy	49.92	

=== Semifinals ===
Held on 8 March.
First 2 from each heat (Q) qualified directly for the final.

Rank	Heat	Name	Nationality	Time	Notes
1	1	Josip Alebić	Yugoslavia	48.07	Q
2	1	Hermann Köhler	West Germany	48.19	Q
3	1	Alfons Brijdenbach	Belgium	48.39	
4	1	Michael Fredriksson	Sweden	49.18	
1	2	Stavros Tziortzis	Greece	50.13	Q
2	2	Józef Laskowski	Poland	50.16	Q
1	3	Semyon Kocher	Soviet Union	48.64	q
2	3	Ossi Karttunen	Finland	49.52	

Note: Only two athletes started in semifinal 2 because the other two were not informed about it. A special third heat was run on 9 March to let those compete for one extra spot in the final.

=== Final ===
Held on 9 March.

Rank	Name	Nationality	Time	Notes
1st place, gold medalist(s)	Hermann Köhler	West Germany	48.76	
2nd place, silver medalist(s)	Josip Alebić	Yugoslavia	49.04	
3rd place, bronze medalist(s)	Semyon Kocher	Soviet Union	49.33	
4	Józef Laskowski	Poland	49.72	
5	Stavros Tziortzis	Greece	50.90	
