= Quentin Wheeler =

American hurdler (born 1955)

Quentin David Wheeler (born April 27, 1955, in Long Branch, New Jersey) is an American track and field athlete. He had the misfortune to be one of the best 400 meter hurdlers in the world at the same time as Edwin Moses was invincible in the event. Wheeler ran in the 1976 Olympics, finishing fourth behind Moses at his debut on the international scene. Only Yevgeny Gavrilenko kept the United States from sweeping the event that year.

Less than two months before the Olympics, it was Wheeler running for San Diego State University who was the NCAA Champion. Wheeler set his personal record of 48.39 at the 1979 Mt. SAC Relays.

Raised in Tinton Falls, New Jersey, Wheeler graduated in 1974 from Monmouth Regional High School, where he was inducted into the school's Hall of Fame in 1993.

- His win in NCAA finals was a collegiate record at the time.

- San Diego State University has also inducted him in their hall of fame for athletics.
