= Leonel Teller =

Nicaraguan hurdler

Personal information
- Nationality: Nicaraguan
- Born: 29 March 1961 (age 65)

Sport
- Sport: Track and field
- Event: 400 metres hurdles

Leonel Teller (born 29 March 1961) is a Nicaraguan hurdler. He competed in the men's 400 metres hurdles at the 1980 Summer Olympics.
