= City of Leicester College =

Academy in Evington, Leicestershire, England

The City of Leicester College
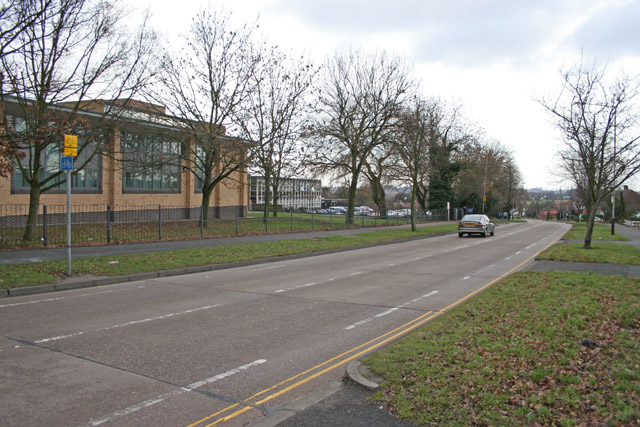
- (2006)

Location
- Downing Drive; Evington; Leicester, Leicestershire, LE5 6LN; England; 52°37′34″N 1°03′40″W

Information
- Type: Academy
- Motto: Ambition for All
- Established: 1965
- Local authority: Leicester City Council
- Trust: Aspire Learning Partnership
- Department for Education URN: 148878 Tables
- Ofsted: Reports
- Headteacher: Ken Vernon
- Gender: Coeducational
- Age: 11 to 19
- Enrolment: 1,742 as of May 2023
- Former name: City of Leicester Boys' Grammar School
- Website: cityleicester.co.uk

The City of Leicester College (TCOLC) is a coeducational secondary school and sixth form located in Evington, Leicester, England. It has around 2,000 pupils and specialises in business and enterprise.

== Description ==
City of Leicester College is in the east of Leicester on Downing Drive, off Spencefield Lane (B667).

The college provides education for ages between 11-19 for different levels from GCSEs to BTECs as well as a sixth-form college. It offers a wide variety of courses but specialises in Business. It is not to be confused with the former City of Leicester College of Education in Scraptoft, which was taken over by De Montfort University and then bulldozed in 2006.

As of 2020 the head teacher is Ken Vernon.

== History ==
The school was founded in 1920 as the City Boys' School, on East Bond Street. In 1928 it moved to Humberstone Gate, to the former buildings of the Wyggeston Hospital Girls' School, which moved to a site in Regent Road which is now the Regent College sixth form. After 1944 the City Boys' School became City of Leicester Boys' Grammar School. In 1966 it moved to the Wyvern building on Downing Drive. The Humberstone Gate building, built in 1878, was used for a few years by Charles Keene College (subsequently merged with Southfields College to form Leicester College) and is now the Leicester headquarters of Age Concern.

It became known as the City of Leicester School when it became a mixed comprehensive in 1976. It merged with the Spencefield School in 1985. The Spencefield building on Downing Drive became the lower school which is now the Gill building, named after former headmaster Mr. Gill.

It gained specialist status as a Business and Enterprise College in September 2003, and the Business and Enterprise Centre (BEC) was created at the Wyvern Building.

Previously a community school administered by Leicester City Council, in June 2023 The City of Leicester College converted to academy status. The school is now sponsored by the Aspire Learning Partnership.

== Notable former pupils ==
City of Leicester Boys' Grammar School:

- Stephen Buckley, painter, professor of fine art from 1994-2009 at the University of Reading
- Alastair Campbell, journalist, broadcaster, political aide and author
- Sir George Deacon, oceanographer and president of the Royal Institute of Navigation from 1961–64
- Paul Dempsey (presenter), sports broadcaster for Setanta Sports
- J. F. C. Harrison, professor of history from 1970-82 at the University of Sussex
- Keith Hill, Labour MP for Streatham
- Harry Humphries, adjutant of 617 Squadron during the Dambusters raid and the rest of the war
- Michael Kitchen, actor
- Gary Lineker, retired footballer and current pundit and presenter of Match of the Day, and former captain of Leicestershire Schools cricket team
- Conrad Mainwaring, competed in the 110 metres hurdles at the 1976 Olympics
- Joe Melia, actor
- David Needham, defender for Notts County
- Sir Roger Sims, Conservative MP for Chislehurst from 1974–97
- Trafford Smith, Ambassador to Burma from 1967–70

City of Leicester School:

- Emile Heskey, footballer
- Gareth Davies, Comptroller and Auditor General at the UK National Audit Office

City of Leicester College:

- Layton Ndukwu, semi-professional footballer for Coalville Town FC
