= Wilfred Kareng =

Botswana hurdler

Personal information
- Nationality: Botswana
- Born: 25 April 1946 (age 80)

Sport
- Sport: Track and field
- Event: 400 metres hurdles

Wilfred Kareng (born 25 April 1946) is a Botswana hurdler. He competed in the men's 400 metres hurdles at the 1980 Summer Olympics.
