= 1976 South American Youth Championships in Athletics =

III South American Youth Championships in Athletics
- Dates: November 4–7
- Host city: Santiago, Chile
- Level: Youth
- Events: 31
- Participation: about 168 athletes from 6 nations

The 3rd South American Youth Championships in Athletics were held in Santiago, Chile from November 4–7, 1976.

== Medal summary ==
Medal winners are published for boys and girls. Complete results can be found on the "World Junior Athletics History" website.

=== Men ===
Event	Gold		Silver		Bronze	
100 metres	Lincoln Neves (BRA)	11.1	Oswaldo Félix (BRA)	11.1	Felipe Gordillo (URU)	11.2
200 metres	José Luis Lozano (PER)	22.6	Oswaldo Félix (BRA)	23.0	Roberto Carter (CHI)	23.0
400 metres	Antônio Dias Ferreira (BRA)	48.9	Arturo Merino (CHI)	50.9	José Peixoto (BRA)	51.6
800 metres	Antônio Dias Ferreira (BRA)	1:54.3	Arturo Merino (CHI)	1:54.6	Julio Ruibert (ARG)	1:57.4
1500 metres	Cristián Castillo (CHI)	4:05.5	Roger Soler (PER)	4:05.8	Patricio Casassus (CHI)	4:06.2
1500 metres steeplechase	Cristián Castillo (CHI)	4:20.6	Luís Martins (BRA)	4:25.2	Fernando Marrón (ARG)	4:28.3
110 metres hurdles	José Luis Lozano (PER)	14.3	Felipe Edwards (CHI)	14.6	Sergio Faivovich (CHI)	14.8
300 metres hurdles	José Luis Lozano (PER)	39.2	Felipe Edwards (CHI)	40.0	Franklin Biancamano (BRA)	41.0
High jump	Carlos Gambetta (ARG)	1.93	Víctor Migliaro (CHI)	1.90	Andrés Badoglio (ARG)	1.85
Pole vault	Carlos da Silva (BRA)	3.80	Sebastián Hevia (CHI)	3.70	Enrique Goytizolo (PER)	3.60
Long jump	Roberto Freitas (BRA)	6.50	Felipe Gordillo (URU)	6.43	Fernando Sancho (CHI)	6.39
Triple jump	Luiz Favero (BRA)	14.20	Roberto Freitas (BRA)	13.60	Héctor Eguillor (ARG)	13.34
Shot put	Gert Weil (CHI)	15.73	José Jara (CHI)	15.49	Roberto Olcese (ARG)	15.49
Discus throw	Roberto Olcese (ARG)	48.66	José Jara (CHI)	44.20	Miro Ronac (PER)	41.22
Hammer throw	Renzo Rossini (PER)	47.90	Andrés Albide (ARG)	46.62	Carlos Macedo (BRA)	45.72
Javelin throw	Eduardo da Silva (BRA)	54.10	Juan Garmendia (ARG)	52.42	César da Costa (BRA)	51.86
Hexathlon	Aníbal Díaz (ARG)	3563	Juan Lagos (CHI)	3459	Hugo Giménez (ARG)	3367
4 × 100 metres relay	Brazil	42.9	Chile	43.7	Argentina	43.8
4 × 400 metres relay	Brazil	3:23.2	Chile	3:24.8	Peru	3:32.2

=== Women ===
Event	Gold		Silver		Bronze	
100 metres	Susana Perizzotti (ARG)	12.2	Adriana Pero (ARG)	12.3	Elizabeth Montesano (BRA)	12.5
200 metres	Susana Perizzotti (ARG)	25.0	Adriana Pero (ARG)	25.1	Pía Ábalos (CHI)	25.5
600 metres	Marcela López Espinosa (ARG)	1:33.1	Sandra Ferreira (BRA)	1:37.9	Daise de Oliveira (BRA)	1:39.3
80 metres hurdles	Susana Planas (ARG)	12.1	Patricia Deck (CHI)	12.2	Claudia Rodríguez (ARG)	12.2
High jump	Ana Maria de Oliveira (BRA)	1.60	Julia Araya (CHI)	1.60	Lucilene Lonardoni (BRA)	1.55
Long jump	Claudia Benavente (CHI)	5.36	Laura Rivarola (ARG)	5.36	Silvia Barchetta (ARG)	5.27
Shot put	Patricia Guerrero (PER)	11.64	Maria Cabaleiro (BRA)	11.13	Cristina Madoz (ARG)	10.87
Discus throw	Ana Gambacini (ARG)	37.52	Zulema Rivera (ARG)	37.34	Gloria Martínez (CHI)	34.58
Javelin throw	Patricia Guerrero (PER)	44.60	Gladys Aguayo (CHI)	41.84	Neusa Trolezzi (BRA)	39.62
Pentathlon	Ana Maria de Oliveira (BRA)	3405	Lucilene Lonardoni (BRA)	3268	Julia Araya (CHI)	3259
4 × 100 metres relay	Chile	48.8	Brazil	49.0	Peru	50.1
4 × 400 metres relay	Argentina	3:56.8	Chile	3:59.2	Brazil	4:01.6

== Medal table (unofficial) ==
* Host nation (Chile)

Rank	Nation	Gold	Silver	Bronze	Total
1	Brazil (BRA)	11	8	9	28
2	Argentina (ARG)	9	6	10	25
3	Peru (PER)	6	1	4	11
4	Chile (CHI)*	5	15	7	27
5	Uruguay (URU)	0	1	1	2
Totals (5 entries)		31	31	31	93

== Participation (unofficial) ==
Detailed result lists can be found on the "World Junior Athletics History" website. An unofficial count yields the number of about 168 athletes from about 6 countries:

- Argentina (40)
- Brazil (37)
- Chile (40)
- Paraguay (27)
- (Peru) Perú (21)
- Uruguay (3)
