= George Deacon =

British oceanographer and chemist (1906–1984)

Sir George Deacon

Sir George Edward Raven Deacon CBE FRS FRSE (21 March 1906 – 16 November 1984) was a British oceanographer and chemist.

== Life ==
He was born in Leicester, the son of George Raven Deacon and his wife Emma (née Drinkwater). He was educated (1919–24) at the Newarke School, Leicester and then the City of Leicester Boys' School. He went as a King's scholar to King's College London (1924–27) where he was awarded a first-class honours degree in chemistry in 1926 and a diploma of education in 1927.

His first post was as lecturer in chemistry and mathematics at Rochdale Technical School. In 1927 he was offered a place as a chemist on the Discovery Antarctic survey and sailed on Christmas Eve on the RRS William Scoresby, transferring in 1928 to the larger Discovery II. In 1937 he was awarded a Doctor of Science by the University of London for this work.

He was elected a Fellow of the Royal Society in 1944. His application citation read: "Since 1927 he has taken physical observations from HM Research Ship "Discovery II" and other vessels in all sections of the Antarctic Ocean, and has analysed and studied these observations. In particular he has described the movements, horizontal and vertical, of the water between the Antarctic Continent and the northern limits of the Southern Ocean, defining Antarctic and Sub-Antarctic areas which are proving significant in the study of the distribution of plankton and of free-swimming and bottom-living animals. He has shown that practically all the bottom water of the Antarctic origin in all the oceans is formed in the Weddell Sea."

During the Second World War he initially worked on HMS Osprey, Portland involved in anti-submarine warfare. This was decommissioned in 1941. He afterwards worked in Fairlie, Scotland, doing research on ASDIC for the Admiralty. In 1944 he joined the Admiralty Research Laboratory in Teddington, Middlesex to study ocean waves. In 1949 he was appointed as the first Director of the new UK National Institute of Oceanography which was later absorbed into the Natural Environment Research Council as the National Oceanography Centre, now UKRI.

He was elected a Fellow of the Royal Society of Edinburgh in 1957. His proposers were James Ritchie, John Barclay Tait, Cyril Edward Lucas, and Vero Wynne-Edwards. He was awarded CBE in 1964 and knighted in 1977.

He retired in 1971 and died in 1984 at his home in Milford, Surrey, aged 78.

== Family ==
He married Elsa Jeffries (d.1966) in 1940. They had one child, a daughter Margaret Brenda, born in January 1942, who became an historian of oceanography.

== Publications ==
- The Antarctic Circumpolar Ocean (1984)
