= Kyriakos Serafim =

Greek-Cypriot track and field athlete

Personal information
- Born: 1952 Larnaca, Cyprus
- Died: 2024 (aged 71–72)

Sport
- Sport: Track and field
- Club: GSZ Larnaca

Kyriakos Serafim (1952-2024) was a Greek-Cypriot track-and-field athlete from Larnaca, Cyprus. He competed primarily in the 110 metres hurdles, while also competing in the 100 meters, 200 meters, and 400 meters. He represented Greece internationally. At the 1970 European Junior Championships in Paris, he reached the semifinal of the 110 meters hurdles. In 1970, he ran 14.7 seconds, becoming the first Cypriot athlete to run under 15 seconds in the event and establishing Cypriot, Greek and Balkan junior records.

== Athletics career ==
Kyriakos Serafim began competing in track and field for GSZ Larnaca in 1966 at the age of 14. Over the next five years (1967–1971), he was recognized as the leading youth and junior 110 meters hurdler in Greece. He gained national recognition in 1968 at the age of 16, winning the 100 meters title at the Greek School Championships, earning a place on the Greek Junior 4×100 meters relay team, and finishing third in the 110 meters hurdles at the Senior Men's Greek Championships.

== 1970 season ==
In 1970, he recorded 14.7 seconds in the 110 metres hurdles, becoming the first Cypriot athlete to run under 15 seconds in the event. The performance established Cypriot, Greek and Balkan junior records. It was also the Cypriot senior national record.

In 1970, Serafim competed for Greece at the inaugural Balkan Junior Championships at Georgios Karaiskakis Stadium in Athens, where he served as a flag bearer for the Greek national team. In the 110 metres hurdles, Serafim later recalled that he was leading the race before striking the final hurdle and ultimately finishing fourth.

Later that year, Serafim represented Greece internationally at the 1970 European Junior Championships in Paris. In the first round, he finished fourth in his heat in 15.47 seconds despite a −4.9 m/s headwind, advancing to the semifinal. In the semifinal, he finished sixth in 15.75 seconds with a −7.3 m/s headwind.

== Basketball career ==
Alongside his track career, Serafim also played basketball for Pezoporikos Larnaca. He was used as the team's sixth man under coach Panayiotis Pieris and was part of Pezoporikos teams that won three Cyprus Cups between 1969 and 1971.

== Retirement ==
Serafim ended his competitive athletics career in 1973 at the age of 21 following an injury, after which he devoted himself to his studies in the UK.

== Honors and recognition ==
In 2018, Serafim was honored by KOEAS as part of a recognition of athletes for their achievements 50 years earlier. Because he was recovering from surgery, his son George accepted the award on his behalf.
