= U. S. Grant High School (Oklahoma) =

U.S. Grant High School

Location
- 5016 S Pennsylvania Ave; Oklahoma City, Oklahoma 73119; United States; 35°25′01″N 97°32′52″W

Information
- School type: High school
- Established: 1953
- School district: Oklahoma City Public Schools
- Superintendent: Jamie C. Polk
- Principal: Adriana Knight
- Staff: 86.03 (FTE)
- Grades: 9-12
- Enrollment: 1,680 (2024-2025)
- Student to teacher ratio: 19.53
- Colors: Red, gray, and white
- Nickname: Generals
- Newspaper: The General Times
- Website: https://grant.okcps.org/

U. S. Grant High School is a high school in south Oklahoma City, Oklahoma. It was named for United States President Ulysses S. Grant. It is one of eight high schools in the Oklahoma City Public Schools district.

The school's current location was built in 2007, with additions in 2015. For the 2025-2026 school year, U.S. News & World Report ranked the school #259-395, tied with 136 other schools, in Oklahoma high schools and #13,427-17,901 nationally, tied with 4,474 other schools.

== Demographics ==
Grant High School has an enrollment of 1,680, with 856 female and 824 males. 96.5% of students are economically disadvantaged, and 50.4% are English language learners.

The race/ethnicity demographic breakdown of the students enrolled for the 2024-2025 school year was:

Race/ethnicity
School year	Enrollment	American Indian/Alaska Native	Asian	Black	Hispanic	White	Native Hawaiian/Pacific Island	Two or more races
2024–2025	1,680	30	9	134	1,327	97	11	72

== Academics ==
Grant High School offers business, technical, fine arts, and world language courses. The school also has a Marine Corps JROTC program. As of 2024, 15 Advanced Placement (AP) courses were offered.

For the 2023–2024 school year, 8% of 11th graders were considered proficient or advanced in English Language Arts, and 3% were considered proficient or advanced in math. The ACT composite score was 13.8, with a college remediation rate of 16.1%.

== Notable alumni ==
- Jim Bolding, world record holder in the 440-yard hurdles (class of 1968)
- Duke Christian, college football player and coach (class of 1959)*
