= Malcolm Chase =

British social historian (1957–2020)

Malcolm Chase in the Brotherton Library, University of Leeds, 2014.

Malcolm Sherwin Chase (3 February 1957 – 29 February 2020) was a social historian noted especially for his work on Chartism.

== Early life and education ==
Chase was born in Grays to the carpenter (later building surveyor) Sherwin Chase and bank clerk Elizabeth (née Austin). He attended Palmer’s boys school before taking a BA in history at the University of York, graduating in 1978. He proceeded to the University of Sussex where he took a MA in modern social history (1979) and then a DPhil in 1984 under the supervision of J. F. C. Harrison (for whom Chase later edited a Festschrift).

== Academic career ==
Chase began working in the Department of Adult Continuing Education at the University of Leeds in 1982 and in 2002 became head of what was by then the School of Continuing Education. He moved to Leeds's School of History in 2005 and in the same year commenced a two-year term as president of the Society for the Study of Labour History. He was promoted to Professor of Social History in 2009, and served as chair of the Social History Society from 2011 to 2014.

In the description of Simon Hall and Rohan McWilliam,

Inspired by the participatory ethos of the History Workshop Movement of the 70s, Malcolm kept in touch with – and continued to learn from – local historians, amateur enthusiasts and the interested general public. He spoke at countless meetings of local history societies, historical association branches, schools and colleges, and regional museums and galleries, regularly penning thoughtful pieces for local and regional history journals. He was generous with his time, encouraging younger historians and providing opportunities for them. At the annual Chartism Day conferences in different centres he was the animating figure encouraging new research and discussion.

Chase retired from his Leeds chair in 2019 as an Emeritus Professor.

== Marriage ==
In 1983 Chase married Shirley Fereday, whom he had met at Sussex University. They had a daughter.

== Death ==
Chase died from a brain tumour on 29 February 2020, aged 63.

== Bibliography ==
- The People's Farm: English Radical Agrarianism, 1775-1840 (Oxford: Oxford University Press, 1988)
- and C. Shaw, eds., The Imagined Past: History and Nostalgia (Manchester: Manchester University Press, 1989)
- The Life and Literary Pursuits of Allen Davenport, with a Further Selection of the Author's Work (Aldershot: Scolar Press, 1994)
- and Ian Dyck, eds., Living and Learning: Essays in Honour of J. F. C. Harrison (Aldershot: Ashgate, 1996).
- Early Trade Unionism: Fraternity, Skill and the Politics of Labour (Aldershot: Ashgate, 2000)
- Labour and Locality (The Wolfson Lecture in Local History for 2003) (University of Cambridge: Institute for Continuing Education, 2005)
- Chase, Malcolm (2007). Chartism : a new history. Manchester: Manchester UP.
- 1820: Disorder and Stability in the United Kingdom (Manchester: Manchester University Press, 2013).
- — (2013). La chartisme. Aux origines du mouvement ouvrier britannique, 1838-58 [Chartism : a new history] (in French). Paris: Publications de la Sorbonne.
- — (November 2013). "Recognising the Chartists". History Today. 63 (11): 6.
- ed. The Chartists: Perspectives and Legacies (London: Merlin Press, 2015)
