= Remigijus Valiulis =

Lithuanian athletics competitor (1958–2023)

Personal information
- Born: 20 September 1958 Šilutė, Soviet Union
- Died: 19 July 2023 (aged 64) Vilnius, Lithuania

Sport
- Sport: Track and field
Medal record
Representing Soviet Union
Olympic Games
| Gold medal – first place | 1980 Moscow | 4x400m relay |
European Indoor Championships
| Bronze medal – third place | 1980 Sindelfingen | 400 m |

Remigijus Valiulis (20 September 1958 – 19 July 2023) was a Lithuanian athlete. He was a gold medalist in the men's 4 × 400 meter relay at the 1980 Summer Olympics for the Soviet Union and as a singles runner he took the bronze medal at the 1980 European Athletics Indoor Championships.

Valiulis died on 19 July 2023, at the age of 64.

== Achievements ==
| Year | Competition | Venue | Position | Event | Notes |
Representing Soviet Union
| 1980 | European Indoor Championships | Sindelfingen, West Germany | 3rd | 400 m | 46.75 |
| 1980 | Olympic Games | Moscow, Soviet Union | 1st | 4 × 400 m relay | 3:01.08 |

== Sources ==
- Remigijus Valiulis at World Athletics
- Remigijus Valiulis at Tilastopaja (registration required)
- Remigijus Valiulis at Olympics.com
- Remigijus Valiulis at Olympedia
- Remigijus Valiulis at InterSportStats.
