= Duke Christian =

American college football player and coach (born 1941)

Biographical details
- Born: 1941 (age 84–85); Oklahoma City, Oklahoma, U.S.

Playing career

Football
- ?–1962: Southeastern Oklahoma State

Baseball
- ?–1963: Southeastern Oklahoma State
- Position: Quarterback (football)

Coaching career (HC unless noted)

Football
- 1965–1970: Southeastern Oklahoma State (assistant)
- 1971–1978: Southeastern State (OK)
- 1979–1987: Baylor (OC)
- 1988: Tulane (OC)

Head coaching record
- Overall: 40–40

Accomplishments and honors

Championships
- 1 OIC (1976)

Duke Christian (born 1941) is an American former college football player and coach. He served as the head football coach at Southeastern Oklahoma State University from 1971 to 1978, compiling a record of 40–40.

Christian was born in 1941, in Oklahoma City. He attended U. S. Grant High School in Oklahoma City, where he lettered in four sports: football, basketball, baseball, and track. Christian then went to Southeastern Oklahoma State, where played football and baseball.

Christian served as an assistant football coach at his alma mater, Southeastern Oklahoma State, for six seasons under Bob Thomas, before succeeding Thomas as head football coach in 1971. He earned a masters' degree from the University of Oklahoma and a doctorate from Oklahoma State University. Christian left Southeastern Oklahoma State in 1979 to become an assistant football coach at Baylor University.

== Head coaching record ==
| Year | Team | Overall | Conference | Standing | Bowl/playoffs | NAIA^{#} |
|---|---|---|---|---|---|---|
Southeastern Oklahoma State Savages (Oklahoma Collegiate Conference) (1971–1973)
| 1971 | Southeastern Oklahoma State | 1–10 | 1–7 | 9th | | |
| 1972 | Southeastern Oklahoma State | 6–4 | 5–3 | T–3rd | | |
| 1973 | Southeastern Oklahoma State | 6–4 | 5–3 | T–3rd | | |
Southeastern Oklahoma State Savages (Oklahoma Intercollegiate Conference) (1974–1978)
| 1974 | Southeastern Oklahoma State | 5–5 | 3–2 | 2nd | | |
| 1975 | Southeastern Oklahoma State | 6–4 | 2–3 | T–3rd | | |
| 1976 | Southeastern Oklahoma State | 8–3 | 4–0 | 1st | | 17 |
| 1977 | Southeastern Oklahoma State | 6–3 | 3–1 | 2nd | | |
| 1978 | Southeastern Oklahoma State | 2–7 | 0–4 | 5th | | |
| Southeastern Oklahoma State: | | 40–40 | 23–23 | | | |
| Total: | | 40–40 | | | | |
National championship Conference title Conference division title or championship game berth
^{#}Rankings from final NAIA Division I poll.
