= Karel Kolář =

Czechoslovak runner (1955–2017)

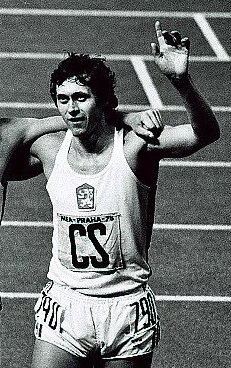
- Kolář in 1978

Medal record

Men's athletics

Representing Czechoslovakia

European Championships
Silver medal – second place	1978 Prague	400 m
Bronze medal – third place	1978 Prague	4×400 m

European Indoor Championships
Gold medal – first place	1979 Vienna	400 m
Silver medal – second place	1980 Sindelfingen	400 m

Karel Kolář (16 December 1955 – 4 October 2017) was a 400 metres runner who represented Czechoslovakia. He won two medals at the European Indoor Championships and two at the 1978 European Championships. He established the Indoor World record (400 m / 46.21 sec) at European Indoor Championships in Vienna.
