= Trafford Smith =

Colonial administrator

Trafford Smith, CMG (1 January 1912 – 15 July 1975) was an administrator, diplomat, colonial civil servant, and military lieutenant who served in colonial administration in Malta and Burma.

Smith was educated at the City Boys' School in Leicester and at Trinity College, Cambridge, where he was the Jeston Exhibitioner and received a first class in both parts of the Modern and Medieval Languages Tripos. He began his career in the Colonial Office in 1935 and was moved to Fiji in 1938. He was made assistant British Resident Commissioner for the New Hebrides in 1940, and for the British Solomon Islands in the same year and for the Gilbert and Ellice Islands from 1941; and he was secretary of the Soulbury Commission on Constitutional Reform in Ceylon 1944 to 1945.

He was an assistant secretary in the Colonial Office in 1945 and was in the British delegation to the United Nations, New York, special general assembly regarding Palestine in 1948. He was the Lieutenant Governor of Malta and also served as acting Governor. Following his departure from Malta in 1959, he was an assistant secretary of the Commonwealth Office until 1967, and in that year he served as Ambassador to Burma.
