= Dámaso Alfonso =

Cuban sprinter (born 1951)

Personal information
- Full name: Dámaso Luis Alfonso Reyes
- Born: 11 December 1951 (age 74) Matanzas, Republic of Cuba
- Height: 1.81 m (5 ft 11 in)
- Weight: 76 kg (168 lb)

Sport
- Sport: Sprinting
- Events: 400 metres, 400 metres hurdles
Medal record
Representing Cuba
Pan American Games
Silver medal – second place	1975 Mexico City	4x400m relay
Bronze medal – third place	1975 Mexico City	400m hurdles

Dámaso Luis Alfonso Reyes (born 11 December 1951) is a retired Cuban sprinter. He competed in the men's 4 × 400 metres relay at the 1976 Summer Olympics. He won a silver medal in the 4 x 400 metres relay at the 1975 Pan American Games.

== International competitions ==
Year	Competition	Venue	Position	Event	Notes
Representing Cuba
1970	Central American and Caribbean Games	Panama City, Panama	4th	400 m hurdles	14.7
1975	Pan American Games	Mexico City, Mexico	3rd	400 m hurdles	50.19
1975	Pan American Games	Mexico City, Mexico	2nd	4 × 400 m relay	3:02.82
1976	Olympic Games	Montreal, Canada	7th	400 m hurdles	50.19
1976	Olympic Games	Montreal, Canada	7th	4 × 400 m relay	3:03.81
1977	Central American and Caribbean Championships	Xalapa, Mexico	1st	400 m hurdles	51.77
1977	Universiade	Sofia, Bulgaria	10th (sf)	400 m hurdles	51.00
1977	World Cup	Düsseldorf, West Germany	7th	400 m hurdles	50.95^{1}

^{1}Representing the Americas

== Personal bests ==
- 400 metres – 46.5 (1976)
- 400 metres hurdles – 49.84 (Montreal 1976)
