= Franz Meier (hurdler) =

Swiss athlete

Personal information
- Nationality: Swiss
- Born: 16 September 1956 (age 69)

Sport
- Sport: Track and field
- Event: 400 metres hurdles

Franz Meier (born 16 September 1956) is a Swiss hurdler. He competed in the 400 metres hurdles at the 1980 Summer Olympics and the 1984 Summer Olympics.
