= Josip Alebić =

Croatian sprinter (1947–2021)

Personal information
- Nationality: Yugoslav / Croatian
- Born: 7 January 1947 Hrvace, PR Croatia, FPR Yugoslavia
- Died: 8 March 2021 (aged 74) Krilo Jesenice, Croatia
- Height: 1.77 m (5 ft 10 in)
- Weight: 72 kg (159 lb)

Sport
- Sport: Track and field
- Event: 400 m

Achievements and titles
- Personal best: 400 m: 45.86 (1977)
Medal record
Men's athletics
Representing Yugoslavia
European Indoor Championships
Silver medal – second place	1975 Katowice	400 m
Mediterranean Games
Gold medal – first place	1975 Algiers	400 m
Gold medal – first place	1975 Algiers	4×400 m relay
Bronze medal – third place	1979 Split	400 m
Representing Europe
World Cup
Silver medal – second place	1977 Düsseldorf	4×400 m relay

Josip Alebić (also known as Jozo or Joško; 7 January 1947 – 8 March 2021) was a Croatian sprinter who specialised in 400 metres. He competed for Yugoslavia in the 400 m and 4 × 400 m relay events in the 1972, 1976 and 1980 Summer Olympics.

He was also won the Athletics Championship of Yugoslavia in 400 m race eight times between 1972 and 1981.

== International competitions ==
Year	Competition	Venue	Position	Event	Notes
Representing Yugoslavia
1972	Olympic Games	Munich, West Germany	41st (q)	400 m	47.01
1972	Olympic Games	Munich, West Germany	12th (q)	4 × 400 m relay	3:05.70
1975	European Indoor Championships	Katowice, Poland	2nd	400 m	49.04
1975	Mediterranean Games	Algiers, Algeria	1st	400 m	46.44
1975	Mediterranean Games	Algiers, Algeria	1st	4 × 400 m relay	3:05.58
1976	European Indoor Championships	Munich, West Germany	8th (sf)	400 m	49.31
1976	Olympic Games	Montreal, Canada	23rd (q)	400 m	46.94
1979	Mediterranean Games	Split, Yugoslavia	3rd	400 m	46.24
1979	Mediterranean Games	Split, Yugoslavia	2nd	4 × 400 m relay	3:04.33
1980	Olympic Games	Moscow, Soviet Union	21st (q)	400 m	46.60
1980	Olympic Games	Moscow, Soviet Union	9th (q)	4 × 400 m relay	3:05.3
Representing Europe
1977	IAAF World Cup	Düsseldorf, West Germany	2nd	4 × 400 m relay	3:02.47
