= Yevgeniy Gavrilenko =

Soviet hurdler

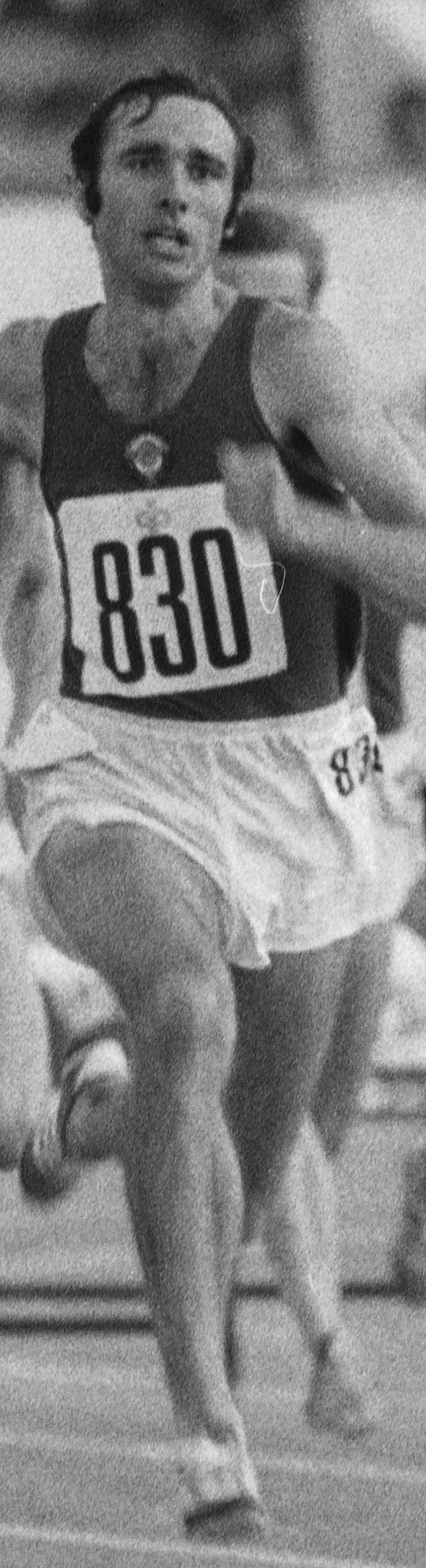
- Gavrilenko in 1974

Medal record

Men's athletics

Representing Soviet Union

Olympic Games
Bronze medal – third place	1976 Montreal	400 m hurdles

European Championships
Bronze medal – third place	1974 Rome	400 m hurdles

Yevgeniy Mikhailovich Gavrilenko (Belarusian: Яўген Міхайлавіч Гаўрыле́нка; born 5 April 1951) is a former Soviet athlete who competed mainly in the 400 metre hurdles. He trained at Dynamo in Gomel.

He competed for the USSR in the 1976 Summer Olympics held in Montreal, Canada in the 400 metre hurdles where he won the bronze medal.
