= Hermann Köhler =

German sprinter (born 1950)

Medal record

Men's athletics

Representing West Germany

European Championships
Gold medal – first place	1971 Helsinki	4×400 m
Silver medal – second place	1974 Rome	4×400 m

European Indoor Championships
Gold medal – first place	1975 Katowice	400 m
Gold medal – first place	1975 Katowice	4×320 m
Silver medal – second place	1973 Rotterdam	4×340 m
Silver medal – second place	1976 Munich	400 m

Hermann Köhler (born 12 January 1950 in Niedermarsberg, North Rhine-Westphalia) is a former sprinter who specialized in the 400 metres. He represented West Germany and competed for the club TV Wattenscheid.

== Achievements ==
Year	Tournament	Venue	Result	Extra
1971	European Championships	Helsinki, Finland	6th	400 m
1971	European Championships	Helsinki, Finland	1st	4 × 400 m relay
1972	Olympic Games	Munich, West Germany	4th	4 × 400 m relay
1973	European Indoor Championships	Rotterdam, Netherlands	2nd	4 × 360 m relay
1974	European Championships	Rome, Italy	2nd	4 × 400 m relay
1975	European Indoor Championships	Katowice, Poland	1st	400 m
1975	European Indoor Championships	Katowice, Poland	1st	4 × 320 m relay
1976	European Indoor Championships	Munich, West Germany	2nd	400 m
