= Jean-Pierre Perrinelle =

French hurdler

Personal information
- Nationality: French
- Born: 6 July 1949
- Died: 30 August 2014 (aged 65)

Sport
- Sport: Track and field
- Event: 400 metres hurdles

Jean-Pierre Perrinelle (6 July 1949 – 30 August 2014) was a French hurdler. He competed in the 400 metres hurdles at the 1972 Summer Olympics and the 1976 Summer Olympics.
