= Francisco Solis (athlete) =

Dominican Republic middle-distance runner

Personal information
- Nationality: Dominican
- Born: 10 September 1957 (age 68)

Sport
- Sport: Middle-distance running
- Event: 800 metres

Francisco Solis (born 10 September 1957) is a Dominican Republic middle-distance runner. He competed in the men's 800 metres at the 1976 Summer Olympics.
