= Vasyl Arkhypenko =

Ukrainian hurdler

Personal information
- Born: 28 January 1957 (age 69) Mykolaivka, Donetsk Oblast, Ukrainian SSR

Sport
- Sport: Track and field
Medal record
Representing the Soviet Union
Olympic Games
Silver medal – second place	1980 Moscow	400 m hurdles
European Championships
Bronze medal – third place	1978 Prague	400 m hurdles
Summer Universiade
Silver medal – second place	1979 Mexico City	400 m hurdles

Vasyl Albertovych Arkhypenko (Ukrainian: Василь Альбертович Архипенко, Russian: Василий Альбертович Архипенко, Vasiliy Albertovich Arkhipenko; born 28 January 1957) was a Soviet athlete who competed mainly in the 400 metre hurdles.

He competed for the USSR in the 1980 Summer Olympics held in Moscow, Soviet Union in the 400 metre hurdles where he won the silver medal.
