= Michael Shine =

American hurdler

Personal information
- Full name: Michael Lyle "Mike" Shine
- Nickname: Mike
- Born: September 19, 1953 (age 73) Youngsville, Pennsylvania, U.S.
Medal record
Men's athletics
Representing United States
Olympic Games
Silver medal – second place	1976 Montreal	400m hurdles

Michael Lyle "Mike" Shine (born September 19, 1953 in Youngsville, Pennsylvania) is a former United States Olympic athlete. At the 1976 Summer Olympics held in Montreal, he earned the silver medal in the 400 m men's hurdles, behind Edwin Moses, who set the world record and effectively opened a new chapter in the event in that race.

He was notable for using a 15 step pattern the entire race, unheard of at the elite level.

Leroy Walker, the Coach of the '76 Team, was shocked when he asked me what step pattern I used and I told him fifteen all the way. He said, 'You can't possibly run the kind of splits that you need to be competitive at this level.' My 200m splits used to be right around 21.3-21.5! I guess I was good enough for a second in 48.69."

Shine was born and raised in Youngsville, Pennsylvania, near Warren, Pennsylvania. He attended Youngsville High School and ran track. He went on to college at the Pennsylvania State University.

Shine served as an assistant track coach at the United States Military Academy under John Randolph for a few years beginning in 1977. He coached hurdlers and 400 meter runners, while continuing to train competitively in his event. He was an athlete affected by the 1980 US Olympic boycott.

== See also ==
- List of Pennsylvania State University Olympians
