= Antônio Ferreira (hurdler) =

Brazilian hurdler

Personal information
- Full name: Antônio Euzébio Dias Ferreira
- Nationality: Brazil
- Born: March 2, 1960 (age 66) Rio de Janeiro, Brazil
- Height: 1.73 m (5 ft 8 in)
- Weight: 62 kg (137 lb)

Sport
- Sport: Athletics
- Event: Hurdling
Medal record
Men's Athletics
Representing Brazil
Pan American Games
Silver medal – second place	1979 San Juan	400m hurdles
Silver medal – second place	1983 Caracas	400m hurdles
Summer Universiade
Bronze medal – third place	1981 Bucharest	400m hurdles
Bronze medal – third place	1981 Bucharest	4x400m relay
South American Youth Championships
Gold medal – first place	1975 Quito	400 m
Gold medal – first place	1975 Quito	4 × 400 m relay
Gold medal – first place	1976 Santiago	400 m
Gold medal – first place	1976 Santiago	800 m
- Updated on 8 May 2013

Antônio Euzébio Dias Ferreira (born 2 March 1960) is a retired Brazilian hurdler.

He won the 400 m hurdles bronze medal at the 1981 Summer Universiade. He became South American champion in 1979 and 1981.

He participated in 4 × 400 metres relay at the 1980 Summer Olympics, the 1983 World Championships and the 1984 Summer Olympics (only in the initial heat in the latter case).

His personal best in the 400 metres hurdles is 49.24 set in Kobe in 1985.

== International competitions ==
Year	Competition	Venue	Position	Event	Notes
Representing Brazil
1975	South American Youth Championships	Quito, Ecuador	1st	400 m	50.3
1975	South American Youth Championships	Quito, Ecuador	1st	4 × 400 m relay	3:27.3
1976	South American Junior Championships	Maracaibo, Venezuela	1st	400 m	48.18
1976	South American Junior Championships	Maracaibo, Venezuela	2nd	800 m	1:51.87
1976	South American Junior Championships	Maracaibo, Venezuela	1st	4 × 400 m relay	3:14.70
1976	South American Youth Championships	Santiago, Chile	1st	400 m	48.9
1976	South American Youth Championships	Santiago, Chile	1st	800 m	1:54.3
1978	South American Junior Championships	São Paulo, Brazil	1st	400 m	46.7
1978	South American Junior Championships	São Paulo, Brazil	1st	800 m	1:50.3
1978	South American Junior Championships	São Paulo, Brazil	2nd	4 × 100 m relay	42.0
1979	Pan American Games	San Juan, Puerto Rico	14th (sf)	400 m	47.32
1979	Pan American Games	San Juan, Puerto Rico	2nd	400 m hurdles	50.85
1979	Pan American Games	San Juan, Puerto Rico	5th	4 × 400 m relay	3:10.9
1979	World Cup	Montreal, Canada	6th	400 m hurdles	50.54^{1}
1979	South American Championships	Bucaramanga, Colombia	2nd	400 m	46.90
1979	South American Championships	Bucaramanga, Colombia	1st	400 m hurdles	50.7
1979	South American Championships	Bucaramanga, Colombia	3rd	4 × 400 m relay	3:10.5
1980	Olympic Games	Moscow, Soviet Union	15th (sf)	400 m hurdles	52.31
1980	Olympic Games	Moscow, Soviet Union	5th	4 × 400 m relay	3:05.9
1981	Universiade	Bucharest, Romania	3rd	400 m hurdles	50.04
1981	Universiade	Bucharest, Romania	3rd	4 × 400 m relay	3:06.79
1981	South American Championships	La Paz, Bolivia	1st	400 m hurdles	52.3
1981	World Cup	Rome, Italy	5th	400 m hurdles	50.45^{1}
1983	Universiade	Edmonton, Canada	19th (h)	400 m hurdles	52.00
1983	Pan American Games	Caracas, Venezuela	2nd	400 m hurdles	50.08
1983	World Championships	Helsinki, Finland	8th	400 m hurdles	45.91
1983	World Championships	Helsinki, Finland	6th (sf)	4 × 400 m relay	3:04.46
1984	Olympic Games	Los Angeles, United States	17th (h)	400 m hurdles	50.76
1984	Olympic Games	Los Angeles, United States	8th (h)	4 × 400 m relay	3:05.08
1985	Universiade	Kobe, Japan	8th	400 m hurdles	51.22
1985	Universiade	Kobe, Japan	9th (h)	4 × 100 m relay	40.22
1985	South American Championships	Santiago, Chile	2nd	400 m hurdles	50.36
1987	Pan American Games	Indianapolis, United States	6th	400 m hurdles	50.20
1987	Pan American Games	Indianapolis, United States	4th	4 × 400 m relay	3:08.21
1987	South American Championships	São Paulo, Brazil	2nd	400 m hurdles	50.67
1988	Ibero-American Championships	Mexico City, Mexico	3rd	400 m hurdles	50.12
1989	South American Championships	Medellín, Colombia	2nd	400 m hurdles	51.26
1989	South American Championships	Medellín, Colombia	2nd	4 × 400 m relay	3:06.33

^{1}Representing the Americas
