= J. F. C. Harrison =

John Fletcher Clews Harrison (28 February 1921 – 8 January 2018), usually cited as J. F. C. Harrison, was a British academic who was Professor of History at the University of Sussex and author of books on history, particularly relating to Victorian Britain.

== Career ==
Harrison was born in Leicester in 1921. He was educated at City Boys' School and at Selwyn College, Cambridge. During World War II he served in the British Army as a captain in the 17th (Uganda) Battalion of the King's African Rifles. After the war he became a lecturer, then Deputy Director of the Department of Adult Education and Extra-Mural Studies at the University of Leeds. From 1961 to 1970 he was Professor of History at University of Wisconsin. He then was appointed Professor of Social History at the University of Sussex, where he remained until his retirement. He has held visiting appointments at Harvard University and the Australian National University.

He died on 8 January 2018 at the age of 96. An extended obituary by Malcolm Chase was published in the Labour History Review in 2019.

== Work ==
'John Harrison writes always for an informed general public and not for examiners or fellow specialists', E. P. Thompson once commented, adding that 'he writes always with clarity, in an unhurried, authoritative, economical style'. Thompson and Harrison had been colleagues in the University of Leeds Adult Education Department, and the years that they spent teaching adult students in 'extramural' classes up and down Yorkshire shaped their determination to make academic history as accessible as possible. That was also reflected in Harrison's formative role in the UK Society for the Study of Labour History, of which he was the first secretary. At the heart of Harrison's achievement as a historian are three books.

1. Learning & Living (1961), described as 'the most influential and widely read work in the field of adult education history'.
2. Robert Owen & the Owenites in Britain and America (1969), published in the USA under its subtitle The Quest for a New Moral World.
3. The Second Coming: Popular Millenarianism, 1780–1850. In his conclusion, Harrison commented: 'We see only as through a glass, darkly. At the end of this book it is apparent how little we know about what ordinary people "think and feel"'. However, the editors of his festschrift (see Honours below) believed that Harrison 'as much as any historian of the nineteenth century, has opened up the history of ordinary people, their thought and feelings. His work is anything but doctrinaire, and it has eschewed preoccupation with narrow, male-dominated, labour movement institutions'.

John Harrison's autobiography (Scholarship Boy: A Personal History of the Mid-Twentieth Century, 1995) is informative about not only the author's academic career but also life in prewar Leicester and military service with the King's African Rifles.

== Honours ==
For his 75th birthday his lifetime's work was celebrated by his colleagues with a festschrift:

- Chase, Malcolm; Dyck, Ian, eds. (1996). Living and Learning : Essays in Honour of J. F. C. Harrison. Ashgate Publishing.

This original collection of critical essays on issues of eighteenth- and nineteenth-century rural life, popular politics and beliefs brought together fifteen well-known historians. All were associated with Harrison, and all shared his interest in the importance of the personal in history, as opposed to the history of impersonal institutions. Among the essays on popular belief were studies of millenarianism, the secularist tradition and a case study of American Muggletonianism – the last by E. P. Thompson. Other essays addressed Owenism, Chartism, the Chartist Land Plan, gender and autobiography, vegetarianism and popular journalism. There were critical evaluations of the influence of America on British radicalism and socialism, on the motives that drove workers' children to become teachers, and on the construction of images of English rural life.

== Works ==
- Social Reform in Victorian Leeds: the Work of James Hole, 1820–1895. Thoresby Society, Leeds. 1954.
- A History of the Working Men's College, 1854–1954. Routledge and Kegan Paul. 1954.
- Workers Education in Leeds. Workers' Educational Association. 1957.
- Learning and Living 1790–1960: a Study in the History of the English Adult Education Movement. Routledge and Kegan Paul. 1961. ISBN 9780751202854.
- Society and Politics in England, 1780–1960; a selection of readings and comments. Harper & Row. 1965.
- Utopianism and Education; Robert Owen and the Owenites. New York: Teachers College Press. 1968.
- Robert Owen and the Owenites in Britain and America : The Quest for the New Moral World. Charles Scribner's Sons. 1969.
- The Early Victorians 1832–51. Panther. 1973.
- The Birth and Growth of Industrial England 1714–1867 (Harbrace History of England). Harcourt Brace Jovanovich. 1973.
- (with Isobel Armstrong, Basil Taylor) Eminently Victorian. BBC. 1974.
- (with Dorothy Thompson) Bibliography of the Chartist Movement, 1837–1976. Harvester Press. 1978.
- The Second Coming : popular millenarianism, 1780–1850. Routledge and Kegan Paul. 1979. ISBN 9780710001917.
- Common People: A History from the Norman Conquest to the Present. Flamingo. 1984. ISBN 9780709901259.
- Early Victorian Britain, 1832–51. Fontana/Collins. 1988.
- Late Victorian Britain, 1875–1901. Routledge. 1991. ISBN 9780415058704.
- Scholarship Boy: A Personal History of the Mid-Twentieth Century. Rivers Oram Press. 1995.
