= Nikolay Vasilyev (hurdler) =

Personal information
- Nationality: Soviet
- Born: 12 April 1956 (age 70) Kaliningrad Oblast, Russian SFSR, Soviet Union

Sport
- Sport: Track and field
- Event: 400 metres hurdles

Nikolay Vasilyev (born 12 April 1956 in Kaliningrad Oblast) is a Soviet hurdler. He competed in the men's 400 metres hurdles at the 1980 Summer Olympics.
