= Conrad Mainwaring =

Antigua and Barbuda hurdler

Personal information
- Nationality: Antigua and Barbuda
- Born: 2 October 1951 (age 74)

Sport
- Sport: Track and field
- Event: 110 metres hurdles

Conrad Montgomery Avondale Mainwaring (born 2 October 1951) is an Antiguan and Barbudan former hurdler and convicted sex offender.

== Early life ==
He was from Leicester. He attended the City of Leicester Boys' Grammar School (now the City of Leicester College), then studied to be a physical education (PE) teacher at Trent Polytechnic.

He taught Divinity and PE at Newry Junior School in Leicester.

== Career ==
He competed in the men's 110 metres hurdles at the 1976 Summer Olympics.

== Sexual assault accusations ==
Mainwaring has been embroiled in a series of scandals in which many athletes he coached during his days as a track coach at various education institutions across the U.S. claimed that he had committed sexual abuse. By 2022, Mainwaring was facing three counts of indecent assault and battery on a child under the age of 14 and nine counts of indecent assault and battery on a child over the age of 14 in Berkshire County, Massachusetts, with the trial scheduled to take place in September 2023. In February 2024, Mainwarning was sentenced to 10 to 11 years after pleading guilty to 14 counts of sexual assault which involved nine male victims who were between the ages of 13 and 19 years old when the incidents took place during the time he was working at Camp Greylock in Berkshire County, between 1975 and 1979. At the time he pled guilty, Mainwaring was also facing seven civil trial sexual abuse cases in the state of New York. Authorities have stated that they believe Mainwaring had “many other victims."
