= Don Hanly =

Australian hurdler and sprinter

Personal information
- Nationality: Australian
- Born: 5 April 1954 (age 72)

Sport
- Sport: Sprinting
- Event: 4 × 400 metres relay

Don Hanly (born 5 April 1954) is an Australian sprinter. He competed in the men's 4 × 400 metres relay at the 1976 Summer Olympics.
