= Dmitry Stukalov =

Russian hurdler

Personal information
- Born: 2 May 1951 (age 75) Leningrad, Soviet Union

Sport
- Sport: Track and field
Medal record
Representing Soviet Union
European Championships
Silver medal – second place	1978 Prague	400 m hurdles
Bronze medal – third place	1971 Helsinki	400 m hurdles
Summer Universiade
Gold medal – first place	1973 Moscow	400m hurdles
Bronze medal – third place	1970 Turin	400m hurdles

Dmitriy Pavlovich Stukalov (Russian: Дмитрий Павлович Стукалов; born 2 May 1951) is a Russian former hurdler who competed in the 1976 Summer Olympics.
