= Georgios Parris =

Greek hurdler (born 1950)

Personal information
- Nationality: Greek
- Born: 27 December 1950 (age 75)

Sport
- Sport: Track and field
- Event: 400 metres hurdles

Georgios Parris (born 27 December 1950) is a Greek hurdler. He competed in the men's 400 metres hurdles at the 1976 Summer Olympics.
