= Urs Kamber =

Swiss sprinter

Personal information
- Nationality: Swiss
- Born: 16 January 1956 (age 70)

Sport
- Sport: Sprinting
- Event: 4 × 400 metres relay

Urs Kamber (born 16 January 1956) is a Swiss sprinter. He competed in the men's 4 × 400 metres relay at the 1980 Summer Olympics.
