= József Szalai (hurdler) =

Hungarian hurdler

Personal information
- Nationality: Hungarian
- Born: 8 March 1961 (age 65)

Sport
- Sport: Track and field
- Event: 400 metres hurdles

József Szalai (born 8 March 1961) is a Hungarian hurdler. He competed in the men's 400 metres hurdles at the 1980 Summer Olympics.
