= José Carvalho (athlete) =

Portuguese sprinter

Personal information
- Nationality: Portuguese
- Born: 15 June 1953 (age 73)

Sport
- Sport: Hurdling, sprinting
- Events: 400 metres hurdles, 400 metres

José Carvalho (born 15 June 1953) is a Portuguese hurdler and sprinter. He competed in the 400 metres and 400 metres hurdles at the 1976 Summer Olympics.
