= Abdullatif Abbas =

Kuwaiti hurdler (born 1953)

Personal information
- Nationality: Kuwaiti
- Born: 18 April 1953 (age 73)

Sport
- Sport: Sprinting
- Event: 400 metres hurdles
Medal record
Men's athletics
Representing Kuwait
Asian Championships
Silver medal – second place	1975 Seoul	400 m hurdles

Abdullatif Al-Sayed Abbas Youssef Hashem (born 18 April 1953) is a Kuwaiti hurdler. He competed in the men's 4 × 100 metres relay at the 1976 Summer Olympics. He won a silver medal at the 1974 Asian Games and was the only Kuwaiti medalist at that competition.
