= Jean-Claude Nallet =

French sprinter (1947–2023)

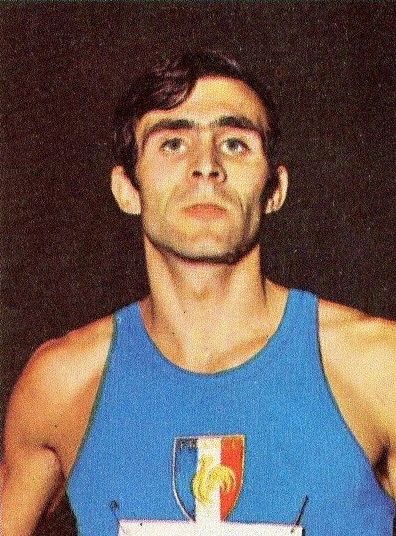
- Nallet in 1968

Personal information
- Born: 13 March 1947 Champdor, France
- Died: 19 August 2023 (aged 76) Mont-Saint-Aignan, France
- Height: 1.87 m (6 ft 2 in)
- Weight: 85 kg (187 lb)

Sport
- Sport: Athletics
- Event(s): 400 m, 400 m hurdles
- Club: AC Paris-Joinville; Racing CF, Paris

Achievements and titles
- Personal best(s): 400 m – 45.1 (1970); 400 mH – 48.6 (1970)
Medal record
Men's athletics
Representing France
European Championships
Gold medal – first place	1969 Athens	4×400 m
Gold medal – first place	1971 Helsinki	400 m hurdles
Silver medal – second place	1969 Athens	400 m
Silver medal – second place	1974 Rome	400 m hurdles
Bronze medal – third place	1966 Budapest	200 m
Mediterranean Games
Gold medal – first place	1975 Algiers	400 m hurdles

Jean-Claude Nallet (13 March 1947 – 19 August 2023) was a French sprinter that competed in the 1968 Summer Olympics in the 400 m and 4 × 400 m relay and at the 1976 Summer Olympics in the 400 m hurdles and reached the final in the relay. He won two gold and two silver medals in these events at the European championships of 1969 to 1974. Nallet retired after finishing sixth in the 400 m hurdles at the 1978 European Athletics Championships. He was married to French Olympic gymnast Chantal Seggiaro.

Nallet died on 19 August 2023, at the age of 76.
