= Viktor Savchenko (hurdler) =

Ukrainian hurdler

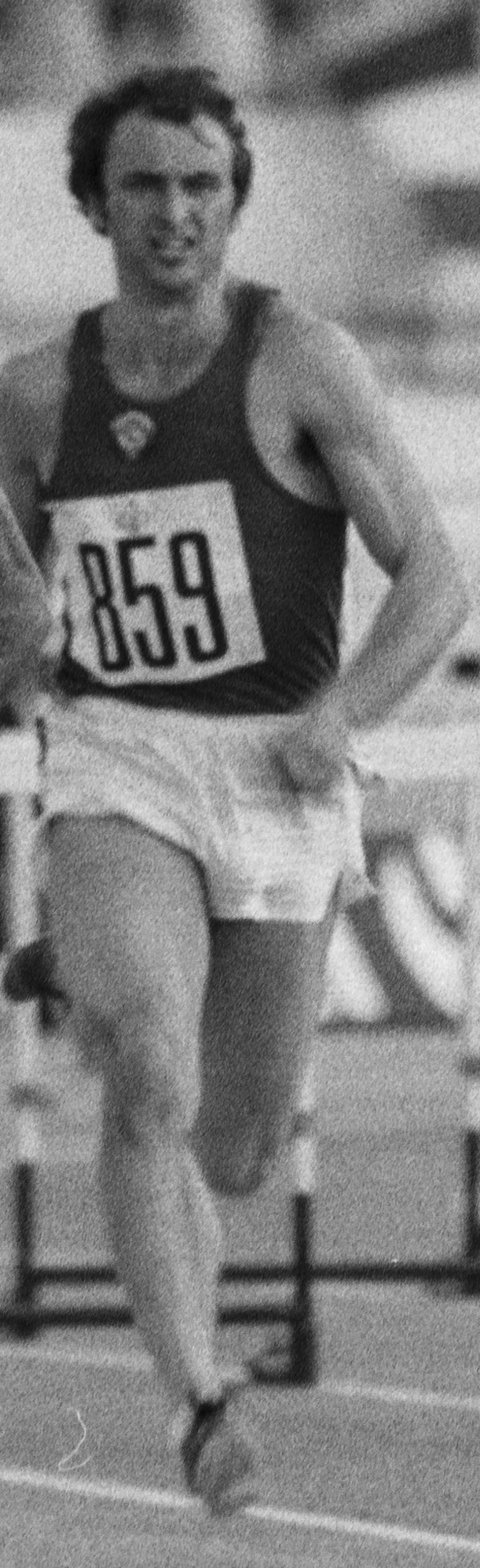

Personal information
- Born: 2 September 1948 (age 77) Zhytlivka, Luhansk Oblast, Ukraine
- Height: 176 cm (5 ft 9 in)
- Weight: 76 kg (168 lb)

Sport
- Sport: Athletics
- Event: Hurdles

Achievements and titles
- Personal best: 400 mH – 49.3 (1972)

Viktor Grigoryevich Savchenko (Russian: Виктор Григорьевич Савченко, born 2 September 1948) is a retired Ukrainian hurdler. He competed in the 400 m event at the 1972 Summer Olympics, but failed to reach the final.
