= Peter Haas (athlete) =

Swiss sprinter

Personal information
- Nationality: Swiss
- Born: 8 January 1955 (age 71)

Sport
- Sport: Sprinting
- Event: 4 × 400 metres relay

Peter Haas (born 8 January 1955) is a Swiss sprinter. He competed in the men's 4 × 400 metres relay at the 1980 Summer Olympics.
