= James Walker (hurdler) =

American hurdler and sprinter

Personal information
- Born: October 1957 (age 68) Atlanta, Georgia
Medal record
Men's Athletics
Representing the United States
Pan American Games
Gold medal – first place	1979 San Juan	400 m hurdles
Olympic Boycott Games
Gold medal – first place	1980 Philadelphia	400 m hurdles
Summer Universiade
Bronze medal – third place	1979 Mexico City	400 m hurdles

James Walker (born October 1957) is a former American hurdler. Born in Atlanta, Georgia, he attended Auburn University from 1976-1980. Walker was one of "The Fabulous Four" along with teammates Harvey Glance, Willie Smith, and Tony Easley; together they set more school and conference records than any other foursome in the history of the Southeastern Conference. Walker qualified for the 1980 U.S. Olympic team but did not compete due to the 1980 Summer Olympics boycott. He did however receive one of 461 Congressional Gold Medals created especially for the spurned athletes.

James Walker lives in Madison, Alabama.

== Achievements ==
- Won the gold medal at the Pan American Games in 1979 in the 400 metre hurdles
- SEC's Track & Field Athlete of the Year in 1979
- Until 2005, held the SEC record for the 400 meter hurdles with a time of 48.48 secs in 1979
- In 1977, 1978, 1979 had the best time in the SEC for the 400 meter hurdles (49.58, 51.51, 48.48)
- NCAA Division I champion, 400 meter hurdles, 1978 and 1979
- In 1976, had the best time in the SEC for the 120 yard hurdles (13.7 secs).
- In 1977, 1978, 1979 had the best time for the 110 meter hurdles (13.90, 14.0, 13.70 secs).
- In 1978, was the U.S. Outdoor Track and Field champion in the 400 metre hurdles with a time of 49.03 seconds.
