= Yanko Bratanov =

Bulgarian former track and field athlete

Personal information
- Born: 10 June 1952 (age 74) Sliven, Bulgaria
- Height: 182 cm (6 ft 0 in)
- Weight: 70 kg (154 lb)

Sport
- Country: Bulgaria
- Event: 400 m hurdles

Achievements and titles
- Personal best: 400 m hurdles: 49.77 (1976)
Medal record
European Indoor Championships
Gold medal – first place	1976 Munich	400 m
Bronze medal – third place	1975 Katowice	4 × 2 laps
- Updated on 21 July 2015

Yanko Ivanov Bratanov (Bulgarian: Янко Иванов Братанов; born 10 June 1952) is a Bulgarian former track and field athlete. He won gold in the 400 metres at the 1976 European Indoor Championships and was an Olympic finalist in the 400 m hurdles in 1976 and 1980. After his athletic career he has worked as a coach in Qatar and Bahrain.

== Biography ==
=== Athletic career ===
Bratanov was born in Sliven on 10 June 1952. He took up athletics early, initially competing in the 110 m hurdles but switching to the 400 m hurdles as a youth. In 1970 he represented Bulgaria at the European Junior Championships in Colombes, but was eliminated in the first round.

Bratanov equalled the Bulgarian record in the 400 m hurdles (51.8) in 1971; in 1972, he won the Bulgarian championship for the first time and improved the national record to 51.24. He repeated as national champion in 1973 and 1974; at the 1974 European Championships in Rome he was eliminated in the semi-finals, but set a new Bulgarian record of 50.66. In 1975 Bratanov won bronze at the European Indoor Championships in Katowice as the Bulgarian team's anchor in the 4 × 2 laps relay.

At the 1976 European Indoor Championships in Munich Bratanov won gold in the men's 400 metres, setting a new Bulgarian indoor record of 47.79 in the final to defeat West Germany's defending champion Hermann Köhler. Bratanov set his personal best in the 400 m hurdles, 49.77, in Fürth on 13 June 1976; he was the first Bulgarian to break 50 seconds. He made his Olympic debut in Montreal later that summer, running 51.84 in the heats and 50.11 in the semi-finals; he qualified for the Olympic final, in which he placed sixth in 50.03.

In total, Bratanov was a seven-time Bulgarian champion; five times outdoors in the 400 m hurdles (1972, 1973, 1974, 1978 and 1979) and twice indoors over 400 m (1974 and 1975). At the 1978 European Championships in Prague Bratanov was eliminated in the semi-finals, but at the 1980 Summer Olympics in Moscow he again qualified for the Olympic final; he was the only athlete to make the 400 m hurdles final in both Montreal and Moscow. He suffered a cramp in the Moscow final and placed a clear last in 56.35.

=== Coaching career ===
Bratanov retired as an athlete in 1983, but remained active in track and field as a coach. Initially, he coached in Bulgaria, moving to Qatar in 1992; his Qatari pupils included Asian champions Samuel Francis and Femi Ogunode. As of 2015, Bratanov is coaching in Bahrain; he coached Bahrain's team for the 2014 World Junior Championships in Eugene, Oregon, but was unable to attend personally after being denied a visa.
