= Horia Toboc =

Romanian sprinter

Personal information
- Nationality: Romanian
- Born: 7 February 1955 (age 71) Ianca, Brăila County, Romania

Sport
- Sport: Sprinting
- Event: 400 metres
Medal record
Men's athletics
Representing Romania
European Indoor Championships
Bronze medal – third place	1979 Vienna	400 m

Horia Toboc (born 7 February 1955) is a Romanian sprinter. He competed in the men's 400 metres at the 1980 Summer Olympics.
