= Christer Gullstrand =

Swedish sprinter

Personal information
- Nationality: Swedish
- Born: 26 March 1959 (age 67) Linköping, Sweden

Sport
- Sport: Sprinting
- Events: 400 metres hurdles, 4 × 400 metres relay
- Club: IFK Helsingborg

Christer Gullstrand (born 26 March 1959) is a Swedish sprinter. He competed in the men's 4 × 400 metres relay at the 1984 Summer Olympics.

Gullstrand was selected the Swedish Athlete of the Year in 1979.
