= James King (hurdler) =

American hurdler (born 1949)

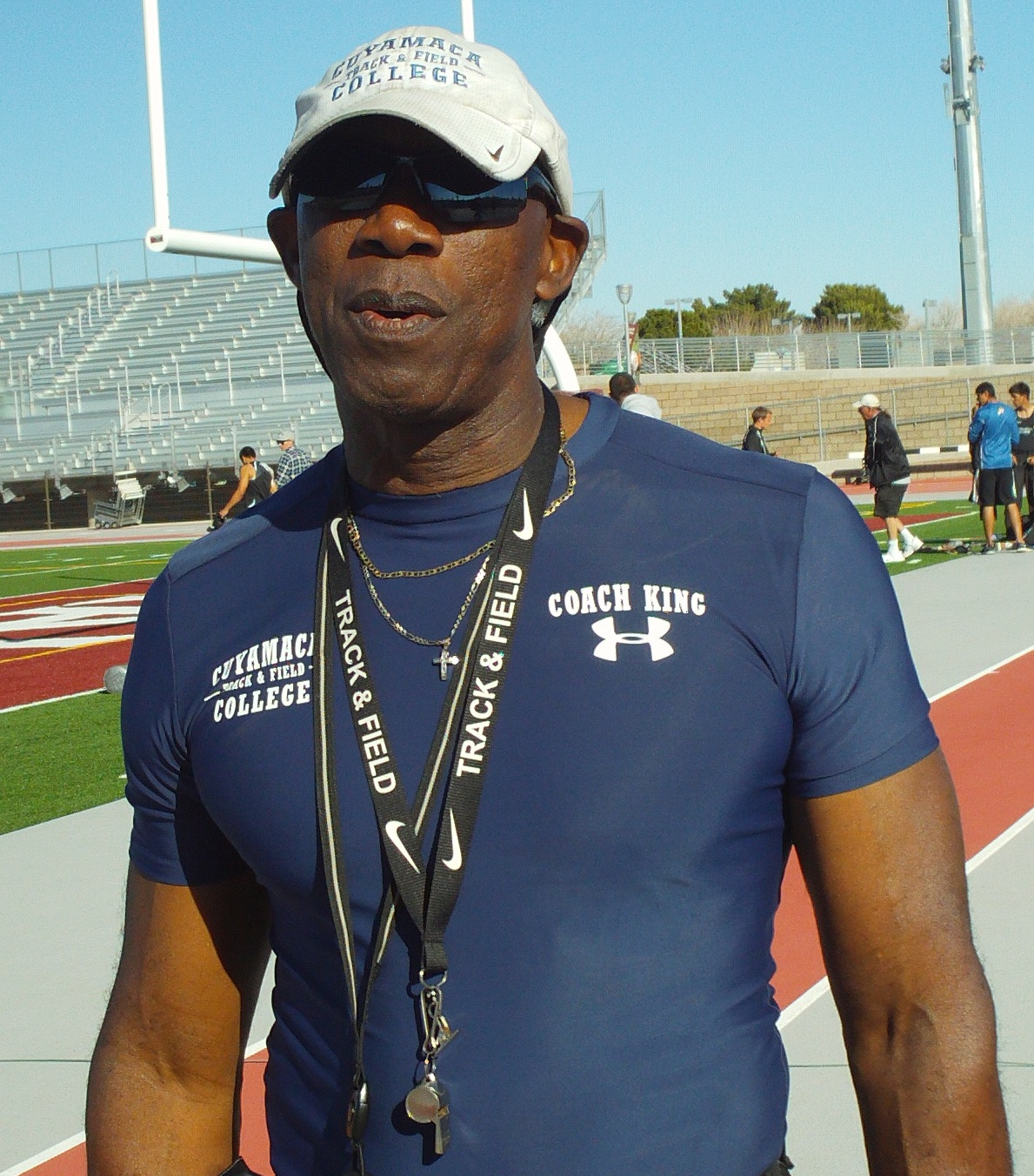
- James King while coaching for Cuyamaca College

Personal information
- Full name: James King
- Nationality: American
- Born: May 9, 1949 (age 77)

Sport
- Country: United States of America
- Sport: Athletics
- Events: 400 metres, 400 metres hurdles
- College team: San Diego State University
Medal record
Men's Athletics
Representing United States
Pan American Games
Gold medal – first place	1975 Mexico City	400 m Hurdles
Bronze medal – third place	1983 Caracas	400 m Hurdles

James King (born May 9, 1949) is an American hurdler. In 1975, he won the Pan American Games in the 400 Hurdles. He was a top level performer for many years also competing in the United States Olympic Trials in 1972, 1976, 1980, and 1984.

He was ranked in the Top 10 United States 400 meter hurdlers for ten consecutive years most of it during the Edwin Moses and Andre Phillips era. He held the official World Masters Athletics World Record in the 400 hurdles for Men 40+ for over 20 years, until it was surpassed in 2012 by Danny McFarlane. He also held the World Record for the M35 and M40 400 metres (without hurdles) for almost 15 years each.

King won the British AAA Championships title in the 400 metres hurdles event at both the 1980 AAA Championships and the 1982 AAA Championships.

King competed collegiately for San Diego Mesa College, then San Diego State University and has remained in the area, coaching at San Diego Mesa College, San Diego City College, Grossmont College and Cuyamaca College. He is currently an assistant coach back at Mesa College.
