= Stavros Tziortzis =

Cypriot hurdler

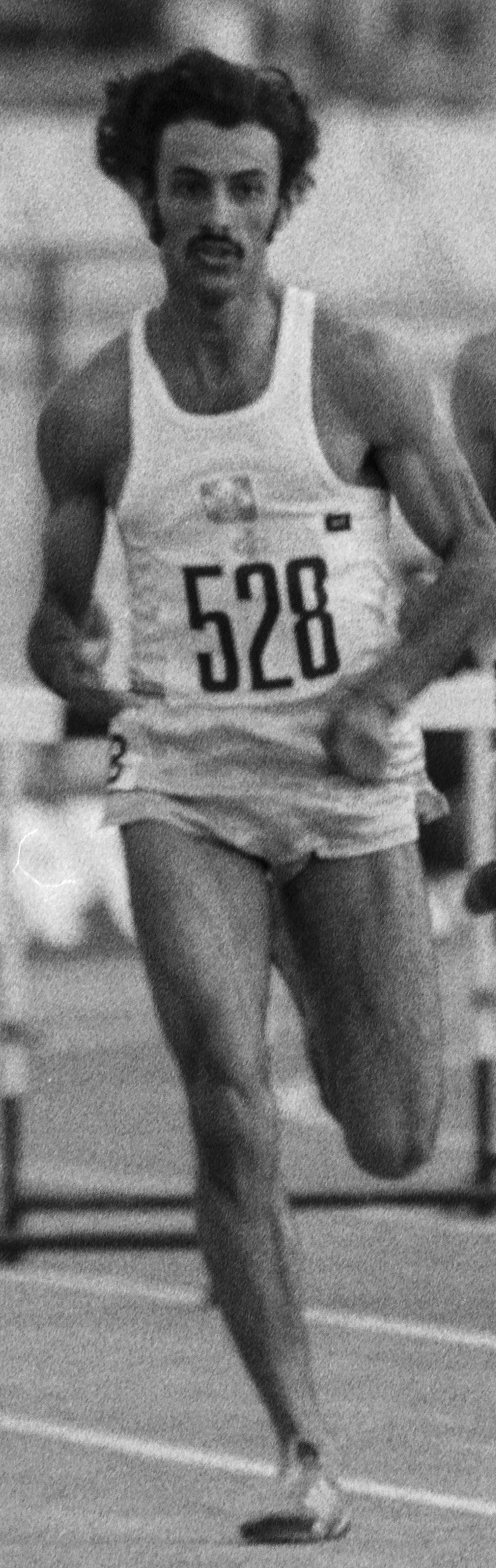

Personal information
- Born: 15 September 1948 (age 77) Famagusta, Cyprus

Sport
- Sport: Track and field
Medal record
Representing Greece
Mediterranean Games
Gold medal – first place	1971 Izmir	400m hurdles
Bronze medal – third place	1975 Algiers	400m hurdles

Stavros Tziortzis (born 15 September 1948) is a Greek-Cypriot former hurdler who competed in the 1972 Summer Olympics (6th place, 49.66 seconds) and in the 1976 Summer Olympics representing Greece. He was named the 1972 and 1974 Greek Athlete of the Year.
