= Athletics at the 1975 Mediterranean Games =

1975 Athletics at the Mediterranean Games

- Dates: 26–31 August
- Host city: (Algeria) Algiers
- Venue: Stade 5 Juillet 1962
- Events: 32
- Participation: 15 nations

Athletics at the 1975 Mediterranean Games were held in Algiers, Algeria and took place from 26 to 31 August.

== Medal table ==
Rank	Nation	Gold	Silver	Bronze	Total
1	Italy (ITA)	10	10	6	26
2	Yugoslavia (YUG)	10	6	3	19
3	France (FRA)	5	2	6	13
4	Greece (GRE)	2	4	7	13
5	Spain (ESP)	2	4	5	11
6	Algeria (ALG)	1	3	2	6
7	Tunisia (TUN)	1	1	0	2
8	Morocco (MAR)	0	1	0	1
9	Libya (LBA)	0	0	1	1
9	Turkey (TUR)	0	0	1	1
Totals (10 entries)		31	31	31	93

== Medal summary ==
=== Men ===
Event	Gold		Silver		Bronze	
100 metres	Pietro Mennea (ITA)	10.43	Vasilis Papageorgopoulos (GRE)	10.44	René Metz (FRA)	10.57
200 metres	Pietro Mennea (ITA)	20.52 GR	Predrag Križan (YUG)	21.20	Pasqualino Abeti (ITA)	21.30
400 metres	Josip Alebić (YUG)	46.44 GR	Kyriakos Onisiforou (GRE)	47.33	Milorad Čikić (YUG)	47.37
800 metres	Milovan Savić (YUG)	1:48.5a GR	Sid Ali Djouadi (ALG)	1:48.8a	Roqui Sanchez (FRA)	1:49.0a
1500 metres	Boško Božinović (YUG)	3:42.6a GR	Mansour Guettaya (TUN)	3:42.7a	Fotis Kourtis (GRE)	3:44.1a
5000 metres	Fernando Cerrada (ESP)	13:42.0a	Jadour Haddou (MAR)	13:42.4a	Chérif Benali (ALG)	13:44.0a
10,000 metres	Abdelkader Zaddem (TUN)	28:27.0a GR	Mariano Haro (ESP)	28:29.2a	Boualem Rahoui (ALG)	28:40.8a
110 m hurdles	Borisav Pisić (YUG)	14.29	Efstratios Vassiliou (GRE)	14.33	Juan Lloveras (ESP)	14.42
400 m hurdles	Jean-Claude Nallet (FRA)	49.76 GR	Georgios Parris (GRE)	50.26	Stavros Tziortzis (GRE)	50.94
3000 m steeplechase	Boualem Rahoui (ALG)	8:20.2a GR	Antonio Campos (ESP)	8:22.6a	Franco Fava (ITA)	8:23.8a
4 × 100 m relay	France; René Metz; Dominique Chauvelot; Joseph Arame; Gilles Échevin	39.42 GR	Italy; Pasqualino Abeti; Pietro Mennea; Luciano Caravani; Luigi Benedetti	39.56	Spain; José Luis Sánchez; Javier Martínez; Miguel Arnau; Josep Carbonell	40.46
4 × 400 m relay	Yugoslavia; Ivica Ivičak; Milorad Čikić; Milovan Savić; Josip Alebić	3:05.58 GR	France; Roqui Sanchez; Francis Kerbiriou; Francis Demarthon; Jean-Claude Nallet	3:06.28	Italy; Flavio Borghi; Alfonso Di Guida; Bruno Magnani; Giorgio Ballati	3:06.72
Marathon	Antonio Baños (ESP)	2:24:13	Paolo Accaputo (ITA)	2:25:48	Vassilios Chimonis (GRE)	2:29:53
20 km walk	Armando Zambaldo (ITA)	1:33:21 GR	Vinko Galušić (YUG)	1:33:31	José Marín (ESP)	1:35:46
High jump	Giordano Ferrari (ITA)	2.16 m GR	Enzo Del Forno (ITA)	2.16 m	Dimitrios Patronis (GRE)	2.13 m
Pole vault	Silvio Fraquelli (ITA)	5.00 m	Lakhdar Rahal (ALG)	5.00 m	Renato Dionisi (ITA)	5.00 m
Long jump	Nenad Stekić (YUG)	8.23 m w	Rafael Blanquer (ESP)	7.70 m	Panayotis Chatzistathis (GRE)	7.60 m
Triple jump	Bernard Lamitié (FRA)	16.19 m	Milan Spasojević (YUG)	16.15 m	Thomas Thoma (GRE)	15.84 m
Shot put	Ivan Ivančić (YUG)	19.43 m	Jean-Marie Djebaili (ALG)	17.52 m	Omar Musa Mejbari (LBA)	16.47 m
Discus throw	Armando De Vincentiis (ITA)	61.26 m GR	Silvano Simeon (ITA)	59.52 m	Nikolaos Tsiaras (GRE)	54.70 m
Hammer throw	Srećko Štiglić (YUG)	68.22 m	Faustino De Boni (ITA)	66.44 m	Jacques Accambray (FRA)	65.16 m
Javelin throw	Žarko Primorac (YUG)	74.72 m	Serge Leroy (FRA)	70.91 m	Renzo Cramerotti (ITA)	69.84 m
Decathlon	Zissis Kourelos (GRE)	7190 pts	Eduardo Rodríguez (ESP)	7098 pts	Nurullah Candan (TUR)	7074 pts

=== Women ===
Épreuve	Gold		Silver		Bronze	
100 metres	Rita Bottiglieri (ITA)	11.79 GR	Jelica Pavličić (YUG)	11.80	Nadine Goletto (FRA)	11.87
400 metres	Jelica Pavličić (YUG)	52.54 GR	Rita Bottiglieri (ITA)	53.34	Rosa Colorado (ESP)	55.55
800 metres	Paola Pigni-Cacchi (ITA)	2:03.8a	Gabriella Dorio (ITA)	2:04.5a	Madeleine Thomas (FRA)	2:07.3a
1500 metres	Paola Pigni-Cacchi (ITA)	4:12.8a GR	Gabriella Dorio (ITA)	4:16.6a	Carmen Valero (ESP)	4:20.3a
100 m hurdles	Nadine Fricault (FRA)	13.59 GR	Ileana Ongar (ITA)	13.81	Đurđa Fočić (YUG)	13.83
4 × 100 m relay	France; Annie Alizé; Nadine Goletto; Catherine Delachanal; Nicole Pani	44.93 GR	Yugoslavia; Branislava Gak; Lidija Vidmar; Đurđa Fočić; Jelica Pavličić	45.44	Italy; Maura Gnecchi; Cecilia Molinari; Laura Nappi; Ileana Ongar	45.92
High jump	Sara Simeoni (ITA)	1.89 m GR	Snežana Hrepevnik (YUG)	1.80 m	Đurđa Fočić (YUG)	1.75 m
Discus throw	Vassiliki Karafylli (GRE)	52.34 m GR	Renata Scaglia (ITA)	50.60 m	Noëlle Jarry (FRA)	50.28 m

== Men's results ==
=== 100 meters ===
Heats – 26 August

Rank	Heat	Name	Nationality	Time	Notes
1	2	Josep Carbonell	Spain	10.70	Q
2	2	Pietro Mennea	Italy	10.72	Q
3	1	Luciano Caravani	Italy	10.80	Q
5	1	José Luis Sánchez	Spain	11.08	Q

Final – 26 August

Rank	Name	Nationality	Time	Notes
1st place, gold medalist(s)	Pietro Mennea	Italy	10.43	
2nd place, silver medalist(s)	Vassilios Papageorgopoulos	Greece	10.44	
3rd place, bronze medalist(s)	René Metz	France	10.57	
4	Josep Carbonell	Spain	10.73	
5	Luciano Caravani	Italy	10.74	
6	Teraya Taoufik Chaouch	Algeria	10.84	
7	Predrag Križan	Yugoslavia	11.00	
8	Brahim Amour	Algeria	11.20	

=== 200 meters ===
Heats – 27 August

Rank	Heat	Name	Nationality	Time	Notes
1	2	Pietro Mennea	Italy	21.17	Q
1	1	Pasqualino Abeti	Italy	21.46	Q
2	1	Javier Martínez	Spain	21.50	Q
2	2	Predrag Križan	Yugoslavia	21.55	Q
3	1	René Metz	France	21.66	Q
3	2	Miguel Arnau	Spain	21.83	Q
4	1	Francis Kerbiriou	France	21.88	Q
4	2	Brahim Amour	Algeria	22.28	Q

Final – 29 August

Rank	Name	Nationality	Time	Notes
1st place, gold medalist(s)	Pietro Mennea	Italy	20.52	GR
2nd place, silver medalist(s)	Predrag Križan	Yugoslavia	21.20	
3rd place, bronze medalist(s)	Pasqualino Abeti	Italy	21.30	
4	Javier Martínez	Spain	21.59	
5	Miguel Arnau	Spain	21.67	
6	René Metz	France	21.68	
7	Francis Kerbiriou	France	21.73	
	Brahim Amour	Algeria	DNS	

=== 400 meters ===
Heats – 27 August

Rank	Heat	Name	Nationality	Time	Notes
1	1	Josip Alebić	Yugoslavia	47.48	Q
1	2	Milorad Čikić	Yugoslavia	48.11	Q
2	2	Francis Demarthon	France	48.15	Q
3	2	José Luis López	Spain	48.23	Q
2	1	Kyriakos Onissiforou	Greece	48.37	Q
3	1	Flavio Borghi	Italy	48.46	Q
4	2	Alfonso Di Guida	Italy	48.51	q
4	1	Tabouch	Algeria	49.74	

Final – 29 August

Rank	Name	Nationality	Time	Notes
1st place, gold medalist(s)	Josip Alebić	Yugoslavia	46.44	GR
2nd place, silver medalist(s)	Kyriakos Onissiforou	Greece	47.33	
3rd place, bronze medalist(s)	Milorad Čikić	Yugoslavia	47.37	
4	Francis Demarthon	France	47.61	
5	Alfonso Di Guida	Italy	47.68	
6	Flavio Borghi	Italy	47.95	
7	Ammanouil Boditsopoulos	Greece	49.14	
8	José Luis López	Spain	49.28	

=== 800 meters ===
Heats – 26 August

Rank	Heat	Name	Nationality	Time	Notes
2	3	Manuel Gayoso	Spain	1:48.8	Q
1	1	Andrés Ballbé	Spain	1:49.3	Q
3	1	Vittorio Fontanella	Italy	1:49.6	

Final – 27 August

Rank	Name	Nationality	Time	Notes
1st place, gold medalist(s)	Milovan Savić	Yugoslavia	1:48.5	GR
2nd place, silver medalist(s)	Sid Ali Djouadi	Algeria	1:48.8	
3rd place, bronze medalist(s)	Roqui Sanchez	France	1:49.1	
4	Amar Brahmia	Algeria	1:49.2	
5	Andrés Ballbé	Spain	1:49.3	
6	Sermet Timurlenk	Turkey	1:49.8	
7	Stavros Mermingis	Greece	1:50.7	
8	Manuel Gayoso	Spain	1:51.2	

=== 1500 meters ===
Heats – 29 August

Rank	Heat	Name	Nationality	Time	Notes
1	1	Spilios Zakharopoulos	Greece	3:48.1	Q
2	1	Mansour Guettaya	Tunisia	3:48.2	Q
3	1	Mehmet Tümkan	Turkey	3:48.4	Q
4	1	Antonio Fernández	Spain	3:48.5	Q
5	1	Vittorio Fontanella	Italy	3:49.5	Q
6	1	Sid Ali Djouadi	Algeria	3:50.3	
?	1	Souleiman	Libya	?:??.?	
1	2	Abdelkrim Djelassi	Tunisia	3:48.9	Q
2	2	Boško Božinović	Yugoslavia	3:48.9	Q
3	2	Fotios Kourtis	Greece	3:48.9	Q
4	2	Kamel Guemar	Algeria	?:??.?	Q

Final – 30 August

Rank	Name	Nationality	Time	Notes
1st place, gold medalist(s)	Boško Božinović	Yugoslavia	3:42.6	GR
2nd place, silver medalist(s)	Mansour Guettaya	Tunisia	3:42.7	
3rd place, bronze medalist(s)	Fotios Kourtis	Greece	3:44.1	
4	Spilios Zakharopoulos	Greece	3:44.7	
5	Mehmet Tümkan	Turkey	3:45.3	
6	Antonio Fernández	Spain	3:46.1	
7	Kamel Guemar	Algeria	3:46.2	
8	Abdelkrim Djelassi	Tunisia	3:46.4	
	Vittorio Fontanella	Italy	DNF	

=== 5000 meters ===
30 August

Rank	Name	Nationality	Time	Notes
1st place, gold medalist(s)	Fernando Cerrada	Spain	13:42.0	
2nd place, silver medalist(s)	Jadour Haddou	Morocco	13:42.4	
3rd place, bronze medalist(s)	Chérif Benali	Algeria	13:44.0	
4	Michalis Kousis	Greece	13:49.2	
5	Antonio Campos	Spain	13:50.4	
6	Luigi Zarcone	Italy	13:55.0	
7	Mehmet Yurdadön	Turkey	14:15.4	
8	Stevan Vulović	Yugoslavia	14:16.0	
	Giuseppe Cindolo	Italy	DNF	

=== 10,000 meters ===
29 August

Rank	Name	Nationality	Time	Notes
1st place, gold medalist(s)	Abdelkader Zaddem	Tunisia	28:27.0	GR
2nd place, silver medalist(s)	Mariano Haro	Spain	28:29.2	
3rd place, bronze medalist(s)	Boualem Rahoui	Algeria	28:40.8	
4	Michalis Kousis	Greece	28:50.6	
5	José Luis Ruiz	Spain	29:21.4	
6	Hussein Makni Soltani	Tunisia	29:53.4	
7	Stevan Vulović	Yugoslavia	30:38.8	
	Giuseppe Cindolo	Italy	DNF	
	Franco Fava	Italy	DNF	

=== Marathon ===
31 August

Rank	Name	Nationality	Time	Notes
1st place, gold medalist(s)	Antonio Baños	Spain	2:14:12.8	
2nd place, silver medalist(s)	Paolo Accaputo	Italy	2:25:47.8	
3rd place, bronze medalist(s)	Vassilios Chimonis	Greece	2:29:52.3	
4	Veli Balli	Turkey	2:33:16.5	
5	Sead Kondo	Yugoslavia	2:45:14.7	
6	Pavlos Makridis	Greece	2:50:12.0	
7	Mohamed Said Daif	Syria	2:54:15.8	

=== 110 meters hurdles ===
Heats – 26 August

Rank	Heat	Name	Nationality	Time	Notes
3	1	Giuseppe Buttari	Italy	14.55	Q
1	2	Sergio Liani	Italy	14.56	Q
4	1	Juan Lloveras	Spain	14.60	q
3	2	Jorge Zapata	Spain	14.60	Q

Final – 27 August

Rank	Name	Nationality	Time	Notes
1st place, gold medalist(s)	Borisav Pisić	Yugoslavia	14.29	
2nd place, silver medalist(s)	Efstratios Vassiliou	Greece	14.33	
3rd place, bronze medalist(s)	Juan Lloveras	Spain	14.42	
4	Giuseppe Buttari	Italy	14.45	
5	Sergio Liani	Italy	14.47	
6	Georgios Mandellos	Greece	14.52	
7	Jorge Zapata	Spain	14.71	
8	Abdelkader Boudjemaa	Algeria	15.61	

=== 400 meters hurdles ===
Heats – 27 August

Rank	Heat	Name	Nationality	Time	Notes
?	?	Jean-Claude Nallet	France	51.37	Q
?	?	Stavros Tziortzis	Greece	51.91	Q
1	1	Giorgio Ballati	Italy	52.77	Q
3	2	Marceliano Ruiz	Spain	52.81	Q
	1	Ángel Horcajada	Spain	DNS	

Final – 29 August

Rank	Name	Nationality	Time	Notes
1st place, gold medalist(s)	Jean-Claude Nallet	France	49.76	GR
2nd place, silver medalist(s)	Georgios Parris	Greece	50.26	
3rd place, bronze medalist(s)	Stavros Tziortzis	Greece	50.94	
4	Giorgio Ballati	Italy	50.94	
5	Marceliano Ruiz	Spain	53.22	
6	Abdallah Rouine	Tunisia	53.67	
7	Lahcene Belhadjoudjaa	Algeria	54.45	
8	Nader Jarrah	Syria	55.70	

=== 3000 meters steeplechase ===
26 August

Rank	Name	Nationality	Time	Notes
1st place, gold medalist(s)	Boualem Rahoui	Algeria	8:20.2	GR
2nd place, silver medalist(s)	Antonio Campos	Spain	8:22.6	
3rd place, bronze medalist(s)	Franco Fava	Italy	8:23.8	
4	Jean-Paul Villain	France	8:37.4	
5	Enrico Cantoreggi	Italy	8:39.2	
6	Mohamed Belbaraka	Morocco	8:44.3	
7	Djelloul Rezique	Algeria	8:50.2	
8	Mehmet Akgün	Turkey	8:54.6	

=== 4 × 100 meters relay ===
31 August

Rank	Nation	Competitors	Time	Notes
1st place, gold medalist(s)	France	René Metz, Dominique Chauvelot, Joseph Arame, Gilles Échevin	39.42	GR
2nd place, silver medalist(s)	Italy	Pasqualino Abeti, Pietro Mennea, Luciano Caravani, Luigi Benedetti	39.56	
3rd place, bronze medalist(s)	Spain	José Luis Sánchez, Javier Martínez, Miguel Arnau, Josep Carbonell	40.46	
4	Libya		42.80	

=== 4 × 400 meters relay ===
31 August

Rank	Nation	Competitors	Time	Notes
1st place, gold medalist(s)	Yugoslavia	Ivica Ivičak, Milorad Čikić, Milovan Savić, Josip Alebić	3:05.58	GR
2nd place, silver medalist(s)	France	Roqui Sanchez, Francis Kerbiriou, Francis Demarthon, Jean-Claude Nallet	3:06.28	
3rd place, bronze medalist(s)	Italy	Flavio Borghi, Alfonso Di Guida, Bruno Magnani, Giorgio Ballati	3:06.72	
4	Greece	Petros Tsakiros, Stavros Mermingis, Georgios Parris, Kyriakos Onissiforou	3:07.37	
5	Spain	Andrés Ballbé, Antonio Brufau de Barbera, José Ignacio Gómez, José Luis López	3:11.61	
6	Algeria		3:17.39	

=== 20 kilometers walk ===
26 August

Rank	Name	Nationality	Time	Notes
1st place, gold medalist(s)	Armando Zambaldo	Italy	1:33:20.8	GR
2nd place, silver medalist(s)	Vinko Galušić	Yugoslavia	1:33:30.9	
3rd place, bronze medalist(s)	José Marín	Spain	1:35:45.7	
4	Vittorio Visini	Italy	1:40:27.5	
5	Christos Karageorgos	Greece	1:42:40.9	
6	Mohamed Meskari	Algeria	1:48:09.6	
7	Abdelhamid Mecifi	Algeria	2:00:21.3	

=== High jump ===
27 August

Rank	Name	Nationality	1.90	1.95	2.00	2.05	2.10	2.13	2.16	Result	Notes
1st place, gold medalist(s)	Giordano Ferrari	Italy								2.16	GR
2nd place, silver medalist(s)	Enzo Del Forno	Italy								2.16	
3rd place, bronze medalist(s)	Dimitrios Patronis	Greece								2.13	
4	Gustavo Marqueta	Spain	–	–	o	–	o	xxx		2.10	
5	Danial Temim	Yugoslavia								2.10	
6	Abdel Hamid Sahil	Algeria								2.05	
7	Ekrem Özdamar	Turkey								2.00	
8	Tarik Kadri	Algeria								1.90	
	Francisco Morillas	Spain								DNS	

=== Pole vault ===
30 August

Rank	Name	Nationality	4.30	4.40	4.50	4.60	4.70	4.80	4.90	5.00	Result	Notes
1st place, gold medalist(s)	Silvio Fraquelli	Italy									5.00	
2nd place, silver medalist(s)	Lakhdar Rahal	Algeria									5.00	
3rd place, bronze medalist(s)	Renato Dionisi	Italy									5.00	
4	Theodoros Tongas	Greece									4.90	
5	Tayfun Aygün	Turkey									4.70	
6	Mohamed Alaa Gheyta	Egypt									4.60	
7	Ben Ahmed Rezki	Algeria									4.30	
	Efrén Alonso	Spain	–	–	–	xxx					NM	

=== Long jump ===
29 August

Rank	Name	Nationality	#1	#2	#3	#4	#5	#6	Result	Notes
1st place, gold medalist(s)	Nenad Stekić	Yugoslavia	8.23w	8.19	–	–	–	–	8.23w	
2nd place, silver medalist(s)	Rafael Blanquer	Spain	7.65	7.70	x	x	x	x	7.70	
3rd place, bronze medalist(s)	Panagiotis Khatzistathis	Greece							7.60	
4	Jean-François Bonhème	France							7.59	
5	Julio Rifaterra	Spain	7.42	7.04	x	x	x	x	7.42	
6	Piercarlo Molinaris	Italy							7.29	
7	Ali Ajmi	Tunisia							7.05	
8	Ahmad Hassan Sobhi	Egypt							7.01	

=== Triple jump ===
26 August

Rank	Name	Nationality	#1	#2	#3	#4	#5	#6	Result	Notes
1st place, gold medalist(s)	Bernard Lamitié	France							16.19	
2nd place, silver medalist(s)	Milan Spasojević	Yugoslavia							16.15	
3rd place, bronze medalist(s)	Thomas Thoma	Greece							15.84	
4	Ramón Cid	Spain	15.45	15.62	x	x	15.19	15.38	15.62	
5	Maurizio Siega	Italy							15.46	
6	Ali Ajmi	Tunisia							15.05	
7	Ahmad Hassan Sobhi	Egypt							14.96	
8	Slim Kilani	Tunisia							14.85	

=== Shot put ===
Rank	Name	Nationality	Result	Notes
1st place, gold medalist(s)	Ivan Ivančić	Yugoslavia	19.43	
2nd place, silver medalist(s)	Jean-Marie Djebaili	Algeria	17.52	
3rd place, bronze medalist(s)	Omar Musa Mejbari	Libya	16.47	
4	Emad Ali Fayez	Egypt	15.90	
5	Ahmed Bendiffalah	Algeria	14.45	
6	Abderrazak Benhassine	Tunisia	14.37	
7	Adnane Houry	Syria	13.77	

=== Discus throw ===
28 August

Rank	Name	Nationality	#1	#2	#3	#4	#5	#6	Result	Notes
1st place, gold medalist(s)	Armando De Vincentis	Italy							61.26	GR
2nd place, silver medalist(s)	Silvano Simeon	Italy							59.52	
3rd place, bronze medalist(s)	Nikolaos Tsiaras	Greece							54.70	
4	Sinesio Garrachón	Spain	x	50.02	x	52.14	52.62	x	52.62	
5	Abderrazak Benhassine	Tunisia							48.76	
6	Tharwat Said	Egypt							47.52	
7	Jacques Zazoui	Algeria							43.80	
8	Tarik Hadji Hamou	Algeria							41.22	

=== Hammer throw ===
27 August

Rank	Name	Nationality	#1	#2	#3	#4	#5	#6	Result	Notes
1st place, gold medalist(s)	Srećko Štiglić	Yugoslavia	63.80	65.48	68.22	65.72	65.72	?	68.22	
2nd place, silver medalist(s)	Faustino De Boni	Italy						66.44	66.44	
3rd place, bronze medalist(s)	Jacques Accambray	France					65.16		65.16	
4	Giovanni Salvaterra	Italy							64.22	
5	Georgios Georgiadis	Greece							63.80	
6	Kleanthis Ierissiotis	Greece							61.68	
7	Javier Cortezón	Spain	59.60	59.76	60.48	x	59.28	x	60.48	
8	Antonio Fibla	Spain	58.48	x	58.32	x	x	58.48	58.48	

=== Javelin throw ===
30 August

Rank	Name	Nationality	Result	Notes
1st place, gold medalist(s)	Žarko Primorac	Yugoslavia	74.72	
2nd place, silver medalist(s)	Serge Leroy	France	70.91	
3rd place, bronze medalist(s)	Renzo Cramerotti	Italy	69.84	
4	Maamar Boubekeur	Algeria	67.30	
5	Ali Memmi	Tunisia	66.30	
6	Mohamed Karakhi	Morocco	65.72	
7	Oussama Chami	Syria	62.96	
8	Tarek Chaabani	Tunisia	60.70	

=== Decathlon ===
29–30 August

The highest mark recorded in each event is highlighted in yellow

Rank	Athlete	Nationality	100m	LJ	SP	HJ	400m	110m H	DT	PV	JT	1500m	Points	Notes
1st place, gold medalist(s)	Zissis Kourellos	Greece	11.11	7.23	12.77	1.75	50.5	15.6	40.12	4.10	53.02	4:44.6	7190	
2nd place, silver medalist(s)	Eduardo Rodríguez	Spain	11.31	7.09	11.36	1.98	49.9	15.0	37.28	3.50	40.58	4:18.2	7098	
3rd place, bronze medalist(s)	Nurullah Candan	Turkey	11.58	6.47	12.48	2.01	50.4	14.8	33.64	3.50	51.34	4:19.2	7074	
4	Giovanni Modena	Italy	11.40	7.11	11.83	1.92	50.1	15.6	35.10	3.90	49.78	4:42.6	7021	
5	Mohamed Bensaad	Algeria	11.53	6.70	10.07	1.80	49.2	15.4	31.48	4.20	51.20	4:06.6	7009	
6	Elie Sfeir	Libya	11.48	7.17	11.55	1.86	51.6	15.7	34.68	3.90	54.80	4:34.6	6962	
7	Rafael Cano	Spain	11.56	6.68	10.88	1.83	50.9	15.7	35.62	4.10	52.78	4:52.8	6758	
8	Alain Smail	Algeria											6065	

== Women's results ==
=== 100 meters ===
Heats – 26 August

Rank	Heat	Name	Nationality	Time	Notes
1	2	Rita Bottiglieri	Italy	11.73	Q
2	2	Nadine Goletto	France	11.82	Q
3	2	Jelica Pavličić	Yugoslavia	11.83	Q
4	1	Annie Alizé	France	12.10	Q
5	1	Cecilia Molinari	Italy	12.21	Q
6	2	Ela Cifuentes	Spain	12.39	q, NR
7	1	Branislava Gak	Yugoslavia	12.45	Q
8	1	Yolanda Oroz	Spain	12.48	q
9	2	Fatima El Faquier	Morocco	12.60	
10	1	Fawzia Ramla	Algeria	12.84	
11	1	Isabelle Stabile	Malta	12.91	

Final – 26 August

Rank	Name	Nationality	Time	Notes
1st place, gold medalist(s)	Rita Bottiglieri	Italy	11.79	GR
2nd place, silver medalist(s)	Jelica Pavličić	Yugoslavia	11.80	
3rd place, bronze medalist(s)	Nadine Goletto	France	11.87	
4	Cecilia Molinari	Italy	11.96	
5	Annie Alizé	France	12.01	
6	Yolanda Oroz	Spain	12.20	NR
7	Branislava Gak	Yugoslavia	12.35	
8	Ela Cifuentes	Spain	12.44	

=== 400 meters ===
29 August

Rank	Name	Nationality	Time	Notes
1st place, gold medalist(s)	Jelica Pavličić	Yugoslavia	52.54	GR
2nd place, silver medalist(s)	Rita Bottiglieri	Italy	53.34	
3rd place, bronze medalist(s)	Rosa Colorado	Spain	55.55	
4	Gloria Pujol	Spain	57.04	
5	Fatima El-Faquir	Morocco	57.38	
6	Leila Idir	Algeria	1:01.36	

=== 800 meters ===
Heats – 26 August

Rank	Heat	Name	Nationality	Time	Notes
2	1	Gabriella Dorio	Italy	2:09.1	Q
1	2	Paola Pigni	Italy	2:10.9	Q
3	1	Carmen Valero	Spain	2:10.9	Q
3	2	Belén Azpeitia	Spain	2:14.4	Q

Final – 27 August

Rank	Name	Nationality	Time	Notes
1st place, gold medalist(s)	Paola Pigni	Italy	2:03.8	
2nd place, silver medalist(s)	Gabriella Dorio	Italy	2:04.5	
3rd place, bronze medalist(s)	Madeleine Thomas	France	2:07.3	
4	Belén Azpeitia	Spain	2:07.7	
5	Carmen Valero	Spain	2:09.5	
6	Neşe Çetin	Turkey	2:10.7	
7	Ülker Kutlu	Turkey	2:11.7	
8	Latifa Dérouiche	Tunisia	2:19.1	

=== 1500 meters ===
29 August

Rank	Name	Nationality	Time	Notes
1st place, gold medalist(s)	Paola Pigni	Italy	4:12.8	GR
2nd place, silver medalist(s)	Gabriella Dorio	Italy	4:16.6	
3rd place, bronze medalist(s)	Carmen Valero	Spain	4:20.3	
4	Zora Tomecić	Yugoslavia	4:22.7	
5	Ülker Kutlu	Turkey	4:27.0	
6	Neşe Çetin	Turkey	4:29.4	
7	Latifa Dérouiche	Tunisia	4:30.0	
8	Encarnación Escudero	Spain	4:30.5	

=== 100 meters hurdles ===
27 August

Rank	Name	Nationality	Time	Notes
1st place, gold medalist(s)	Nadine Fricault	France	13.59	GR
2nd place, silver medalist(s)	Ileana Ongar	Italy	13.81	
3rd place, bronze medalist(s)	Đurđa Fočić	Yugoslavia	13.83	
4	Antonella Battaglia	Italy	14.13	
5	Stella Kalopedi	Greece	14.67	
6	Cherifa Meskaoui	Morocco	15.60	
7	Zohra Azaiev	Tunisia	15.65	

=== 4 × 100 meters relay ===
30 August

Rank	Nation	Competitors	Time	Notes
1st place, gold medalist(s)	France	Annie Alizé, Nadine Goletto, Catherine Delachanal, Nicole Pani	44.93	GR
2nd place, silver medalist(s)	Yugoslavia	Branislava Gak, Lidija Vidmar, Đurđa Fočić, Jelica Pavličić	45.44	
3rd place, bronze medalist(s)	Italy	Maura Gnecchi, Cecilia Molinari, Laura Nappi, Ileana Ongar	45.92	NR
4	Spain	Yolanda Oroz, Ela Cifuentes, Rosa Colorado, Gloria Pujol	48.02	
5	Algeria	Fawzia Ramla, Redaouia, Kebaili, Selmi	49.12	

=== High jump ===
26 August

Rank	Name	Nationality	Result	Notes
1st place, gold medalist(s)	Sara Simeoni	Italy	1.89	GR
2nd place, silver medalist(s)	Snežana Hrepevnik	Yugoslavia	1.80	
3rd place, bronze medalist(s)	Đurđa Fočić	Yugoslavia	1.75	
4	Alexandra Batatoli	Greece	1.70	
5	Sagrario Aguado	Spain	1.65	
6	Kaouther Akremi	Tunisia	1.60	
7	Yamina Bourzama	Algeria	1.55	

=== Discus throw ===
29 August

Rank	Name	Nationality	Result	Notes
1st place, gold medalist(s)	Vassiliki Karafylli	Greece	52.34	GR
2nd place, silver medalist(s)	Renata Scaglia	Italy	50.60	
3rd place, bronze medalist(s)	Noëlle Jarry	France	50.28	
4	Fethia Jerbi	Tunisia	40.22	
5	Jennifer Pace	Malta	37.36	
6	Naziha Moulay	Algeria	32.74	
