= Athletics at the 1977 Summer Universiade – Men's 4 × 400 metres relay =

The men's 4 × 400 metres relay event at the 1977 Summer Universiade was held at the Vasil Levski National Stadium in Sofia on 22 and 23 August.

== Results ==
=== Heats ===
Rank	Heat	Nation	Athletes	Time	Notes
1	1	West Germany	Lothar Krieg, Eberhard Schneider, Ulrich Zunker, Rolf Ziegler	3:09.7	Q
2	1	Soviet Union	Pavel Litovchenko, Oleg Bulatkin, Aleksandr Goncharov, Anatoliy Reshetnyak	3:10.2	Q
3	1	Spain	Jenaro Iritia, Leopoldo Puertas, Ángel Cruz, Miguel Arnau	3:10.9	
4	1	Japan	Takashi Ishii, Yasuhiro Harada, Hiroyuki Oda, Takashi Nagao	3:11.0	
1	2	France	Hector Llatser, Robert Froissart, José Marajo, Francis Kerbiriou	3:08.7	Q
2	2	Italy	Daniele Zanini, Alfonso Di Guida, Angelo Bianchi, Flavio Borghi	3:09.7	Q
3	2	Switzerland	Rolf Gisler, Armin Tschenett, Carl Schönberg, Konstantin Vogt	3:10.7	
4	2	Great Britain	Steve Scutt, Roger Jenkins, David West, Alan Bell	3:11.9	
1	3	Poland	Jerzy Pietrzyk, Henryk Galant, Cezary Łapiński, Ryszard Podlas	3:06.5	Q
2	3	Yugoslavia	Josip Bohucki, Dragan Životić, Željko Knapić, Milovan Savić	3:07.8	Q
3	3	United States	Evis Jennings, Willie Smith, Tim Dale, Tom Andrews	3:08.6	q
4	3	Bulgaria	Vasil Kasov, Yanko Bratanov, Narzis Popov, Yordan Yordanov	3:08.7	q

=== Final ===
Rank	Nation	Athletes	Time	Notes
1st place, gold medalist(s)	United States	Evis Jennings, Willie Smith, Tim Dale, Tom Andrews	3:01.2	UR
2nd place, silver medalist(s)	Poland	Jerzy Pietrzyk, Henryk Galant, Cezary Łapiński, Ryszard Podlas	3:01.52	
3rd place, bronze medalist(s)	West Germany	Lothar Krieg, Eberhard Schneider, Ulrich Zunker, Rolf Ziegler	3:06.3	
4	Yugoslavia	Josip Bohucki, Dragan Životić, Željko Knapić, Milovan Savić	3:06.5	
5	Soviet Union	Pavel Litovchenko, Oleg Bulatkin, Aleksandr Goncharov, Anatoliy Reshetnyak	3:06.9	
6	France	Hector Llatser, Robert Froissart, José Marajo, Francis Kerbiriou	3:06.9	
7	Italy	Daniele Zanini, Alfonso Di Guida, Angelo Bianchi, Flavio Borghi	3:07.0	
	Bulgaria	Vasil Kasov, Yanko Bratanov, Narzis Popov, Yordan Yordanov	DQ	
