= Athletics at the 1975 Summer Universiade – Men's 400 metres =

The men's 400 metres event at the 1975 Summer Universiade was held at the Stadio Olimpico in Rome on 18 and 19 September.

== Medalists ==
Gold	Silver	Bronze
Jerzy Pietrzyk; Poland	Roger Jenkins; Great Britain	Brian Saunders; Canada

== Results ==
=== Heats ===
Held on 18 September

Rank	Heat	Athlete	Nationality	Time	Notes
1	6	Roger Jenkins	Great Britain	46.75	Q
2	6	Jean-Jacques David	France	47.05	Q
3	1	Jerzy Pietrzyk	Poland	47.12	Q
4	4	Wolfgang Druschky	West Germany	47.54	Q
5	2	Brian Saunders	Canada	47.57	Q
6	2	Konstantin Vogt	Switzerland	47.66	Q
7	4	Vladimir Nosenko	Soviet Union	47.68	Q
8	1	Alfonso Di Guida	Italy	47.74	Q
9	3	Aleksandr Bratchikov	Soviet Union	47.88	Q
10	2	Peter Matejka	Austria	47.92	q
11	6	Petros Tsiakiros	Cyprus	47.96	q
12	4	Vasil Kasov	Bulgaria	47.98	q
13	3	Markku Taskinen	Finland	48.02	Q
14	6	Ivica Ivičak	Yugoslavia	48.15	q
15	5	Kyriakos Onissiforou	Greece	48.20	Q
16	3	Alberto Diana	Italy	48.36	
17	2	Tibor Nagy	Hungary	48.39	
18	1	Henri Hermans	Belgium	48.44	
18	3	Alex Fortelny	Austria	48.44	
20	5	Gérard Boutier	France	48.64	Q
21	3	Enrique Aguirre	Mexico	48.75	
21	6	Houshemy Yar Arshadi	Iran	48.75	
23	2	Supanit Wongsalunkarn	Thailand	48.82	
24	4	Enrique de la Mora	Mexico	48.83	
25	1	José Antônio Rabaca	Brazil	49.09	
26	5	Milorad Čikić	Yugoslavia	50.06	
27	5	Mahodbol Oureshi	Pakistan	51.78	
28	1	Wilfrid Cyriaque	Haiti	51.86	
29	1	Carlos Mejía	Honduras	53.53	
30	2	Rodolfo Lanez	Honduras	58.64	

=== Semifinals ===
Held on 19 September

Rank	Heat	Athlete	Nationality	Time	Notes
1	2	Roger Jenkins	Great Britain	47.46	Q
2	1	Markku Taskinen	Finland	47.61	Q
3	1	Jerzy Pietrzyk	Poland	47.65	Q
4	1	Alfonso Di Guida	Italy	47.80	Q
5	1	Wolfgang Druschky	West Germany	47.81	Q
6	2	Brian Saunders	Canada	47.92	Q
7	2	Konstantin Vogt	Switzerland	47.94	Q
8	1	Vladimir Nosenko	Soviet Union	48.01	
9	2	Aleksandr Bratchikov	Soviet Union	48.08	Q
10	2	Peter Matejka	Austria	48.41	
11	1	Kyriakos Onissiforou	Greece	48.47	
12	2	Gérard Boutier	France	48.73	
13	1	Vasil Kasov	Bulgaria	48.81	
14	1	Jean-Jacques David	France	49.25	
15	2	Ivica Ivičak	Yugoslavia	51.08	
	2	Petros Tsiakiros	Cyprus	?	

=== Final ===
Held on 19 September

Rank	Athlete	Nationality	Time	Notes
1st place, gold medalist(s)	Jerzy Pietrzyk	Poland	46.26	
2nd place, silver medalist(s)	Roger Jenkins	Great Britain	46.55	
3rd place, bronze medalist(s)	Brian Saunders	Canada	46.83	
4	Alfonso Di Guida	Italy	47.11	
5	Markku Taskinen	Finland	47.12	
6	Konstantin Vogt	Switzerland	47.13	
7	Wolfgang Druschky	West Germany	47.34	
8	Aleksandr Bratchikov	Soviet Union	47.49	
