= Athletics at the 1975 Summer Universiade – Men's 800 metres =

The men's 800 metres event at the 1975 Summer Universiade was held at the Stadio Olimpico in Rome on 20 and 21 September.

== Medalists ==
Gold	Silver	Bronze
Waldemar Gondek; Poland	Pavel Litovchenko; Soviet Union	Sid Ali Djouadi; Algeria

== Results ==
=== Heats ===
Rank	Heat	Athlete	Nationality	Time	Notes
1	2	Amar Brahmia	Algeria	1:49.30	Q
2	1	Sid Ali Djouadi	Algeria	1:49.70	Q
3	2	Waldemar Gondek	Poland	1:49.74	Q
4	2	Viktor Solonetskiy	Soviet Union	1:49.75	q
5	1	Tony Settle	Great Britain	1:50.03	Q
6	1	Alessandro Castelli	Italy	1:50.16	q
7	1	Josef Schmid	West Germany	1:50.27	
8	3	Milovan Savić	Yugoslavia	1:50.68	Q
9	3	Pavel Litovchenko	Soviet Union	1:50.73	Q
10	3	Philippe Meyer	France	1:50.75	
11	1	Dragan Životić	Yugoslavia	1:50.88	
12	3	Taiwo Ogunjobi	Nigeria	1:51.49	
13	2	Andreu Ballbé	Spain	1:51.70	
14	3	Peter Lewis	Great Britain	1:51.84	
15	3	Vicente Pimentel Silva	Brazil	1:52.48	
16	2	Karl Schönenberger	Switzerland	1:52.63	
17	3	Francisco Recuero	Spain	1:52.97	
18	3	Abass Ahmad Al-Basri	Kuwait	1:53.11	
19	1	Mohamed Reza Hasan Gaviar	Iran	1:53.38	
20	1	Elio Carraveta	Brazil	1:53.65	
21	2	Francisco Méndez	Mexico	1:55.96	
22	2	Mahodbol Oureshi	Pakistan	2:00.21	

=== Final ===
Rank	Athlete	Nationality	Time	Notes
1st place, gold medalist(s)	Waldemar Gondek	Poland	1:50.04	
2nd place, silver medalist(s)	Pavel Litovchenko	Soviet Union	1:50.13	
3rd place, bronze medalist(s)	Sid Ali Djouadi	Algeria	1:50.19	
4	Amar Brahmia	Algeria	1:50.28	
5	Milovan Savić	Yugoslavia	1:50.39	
6	Alessandro Castelli	Italy	1:50.74	
7	Viktor Solonetskiy	Soviet Union	1:53.19	
8	Tony Settle	Great Britain	1:59.48	
