= Athletics at the 1977 Summer Universiade – Men's 400 metres =

The men's 400 metres event at the 1977 Summer Universiade was held at the Vasil Levski National Stadium in Sofia on 19, 20 and 21 August.

== Medalists ==
Gold	Silver	Bronze
Fons Brydenbach; Belgium	Willie Smith; United States	Ryszard Podlas; Poland

== Results ==
=== Heats ===
Rank	Heat	Athlete	Nationality	Time	Notes
1	2	Willie Smith	United States	46.35	Q
2	5	Steve Scutt	Great Britain	46.53	Q
3	7	Ryszard Podlas	Poland	46.57	Q
4	2	Jerzy Pietrzyk	Poland	46.58	Q
5	1	Elvis Jennings	United States	46.59	Q
6	4	Zakir Urinov	Soviet Union	46.88	Q
7	3	Fons Brydenbach	Belgium	47.08	Q
8	5	Brian Saunders	Canada	47.12	Q
9	2	Yasuhiro Harada	Japan	47.14	q
10	7	Glenn Bogue	Canada	47.17	Q
11	3	Hector Llatser	France	47.22	Q
11	5	Narzis Popov	Bulgaria	47.22	q
13	1	Horia Toboc	Romania	47.28	Q
14	7	Flavio Borghi	Italy	47.29	q
15	2	Lionel Malingre	France	47.35	q
16	6	Alfonso Di Guida	Italy	47.37	Q
17	6	Lothar Krieg	West Germany	47.40	Q
18	1	Željko Knapić	Yugoslavia	47.55	q
19	3	Pavel Litovchenko	Soviet Union	47.63	q
20	7	Konstantin Vogt	Switzerland	47.67	q
21	7	Jukka Paaianen	Finland	47.73	q
22	4	Rolf Gisler	Switzerland	47.75	Q
23	1	Alexander Feroteiny	Austria	47.83	
24	4	Henry Hermans	Belgium	47.84	
25	6	Leopoldo Puertas	Spain	47.85	
26	6	Alphonse Mandonda	Congo	47.93	
27	3	Iritia Genaro	Spain	48.11	
28	3	Josip Bohucki	Yugoslavia	48.39	
29	8	Takashi Nagao	Japan	48.51	Q
30	8	Roger Jenkins	Great Britain	48.66	Q
31	7	Istvan de Jesús	Puerto Rico	48.83	
32	1	Jean-Prosper Rajaonarison	Madagascar	48.92	
33	8	Yordan Yordanov	Bulgaria	49.12	
34	2	Brahim Badi	Algeria	49.15	
35	4	Omer Yousif	Sudan	49.23	
36	8	Eberhard Schneider	West Germany	49.24	
37	8	Istvan Nagy	Romania	49.43	
38	2	Klaus Mayramhof	Austria	49.93	
39	3	Aydoğan Erdoğan	Turkey	50.08	
40	8	Moustapha Belgacem	Tunisia	51.44	
41	6	Amor Ghimaji	Tunisia	51.45	
42	4	Titus Kiboi	Kenya	53.85	

=== Semifinals ===
Rank	Heat	Athlete	Nationality	Time	Notes
1	3	Willie Smith	United States	45.71	Q
2	1	Lothar Krieg	West Germany	46.24	Q
3	3	Fons Brydenbach	Belgium	46.32	Q
4	1	Elvis Jennings	United States	46.40	Q
5	2	Steve Scutt	Great Britain	46.42	Q
6	1	Jerzy Pietrzyk	Poland	46.58	q
7	2	Ryszard Podlas	Poland	46.59	Q
8	3	Brian Saunders	Canada	46.76	q
9	2	Zakir Urinov	Soviet Union	46.97	
10	1	Glenn Bogue	Canada	47.04	
10	2	Željko Knapić	Yugoslavia	47.04	
12	2	Narzis Popov	Bulgaria	47.05	
13	1	Alfonso Di Guida	Italy	47.15	
14	2	Yasuhiro Harada	Japan	47.26	
15	1	Rolf Gisler	Switzerland	47.40	
16	1	Takashi Nagao	Japan	47.46	
17	3	Flavio Borghi	Italy	47.65	
18	2	Jukka Paaianen	Finland	47.73	
19	3	Konstantin Vogt	Switzerland	47.73	
	?	Horia Toboc	Romania	?	
	?	Roger Jenkins	Great Britain	?	
	?	Hector Llatser	France	DNS	
	?	Lionel Malingre	France	DNS	
	1	Pavel Litovchenko	Soviet Union	DNS	

=== Final ===
Rank	Athlete	Nationality	Time	Notes
1st place, gold medalist(s)	Fons Brydenbach	Belgium	45.18	
2nd place, silver medalist(s)	Willie Smith	United States	45.34	
3rd place, bronze medalist(s)	Ryszard Podlas	Poland	45.36	
4	Elvis Jennings	United States	45.95	
5	Lothar Krieg	West Germany	46.25	
6	Steve Scutt	Great Britain	46.27	
7	Jerzy Pietrzyk	Poland	46.40	
8	Brian Saunders	Canada	46.41	
