= Athletics at the 1975 Summer Universiade – Men's 4 × 400 metres relay =

The men's 4 × 400 metres relay event at the 1975 Summer Universiade was held at the Stadio Olimpico in Rome on 20 and 21 September.

== Results ==
=== Heats ===
Rank	Heat	Nation	Athletes	Time	Notes
1	1	Soviet Union	Vladimir Nosenko, Pavel Kozban, Nikolay Yavtushenko, Aleksandr Bratchikov	3:10.06	Q
2	1	Italy	Alberto Diana, Giovanni Bongiorni, Emanuele Allegri, Alfonso Di Guida	3:11.57	Q
3	1	France	Gérard Boutier, Jean-Jacques David, Lucien Baggio, Philippe Meyer	3:14.80	Q
4	2	Yugoslavia	Milorad Čikić, Ivica Ivičak, Milorad Savić, Dragan Životić	3:16.23	Q
5	2	Switzerland	Konstantin Vogt, Rolf Gisler, Franco Fähndrich, Armin Tschenett	3:16.56	Q
6	2	Poland	Waldemar Szlendak, Jerzy Pietrzyk, Jerzy Hewelt, Waldemar Gondek	3:16.68	Q
7	2	Mexico	Enrique Aguirre, Miguel López, Enrique de la Mora, José Javier Sardo	3:16.97	q
8	1	France	Jorge Mathias, Vicente Pimentel Silva, Elio Carraveta, Jose Antônio Rabaca	3:17.47	q
9	2	Great Britain	Tony Settle, Bill Hartley, Roger Jenkins, Peter Lewis	3:23.51	

=== Final ===
Rank	Nation	Athletes	Time	Notes
1st place, gold medalist(s)	Poland	Waldemar Szlendak, Jerzy Pietrzyk, Jerzy Hewelt, Waldemar Gondek	3:09.13	
2nd place, silver medalist(s)	Yugoslavia	Milorad Čikić, Ivica Ivičak, Milorad Savić, Dragan Životić	3:09.71	
3rd place, bronze medalist(s)	Soviet Union	Vladimir Nosenko, Pavel Kozban, Nikolay Yavtushenko, Aleksandr Bratchikov	3:10.09	
4	Italy	Alberto Diana, Giovanni Bongiorni, Emanuele Allegri, Alfonso Di Guida	3:10.45	
5	Switzerland	Armin Tschenett, Konstantin Vogt, Franco Fähndrich, Rolf Gisler	3:10.95	
6	France	Gérard Boutier, Jean-Jacques David, Lucien Baggio, Philippe Meyer	3:13.41	
7	Brazil	Elio Carraveta, Vicente Pimentel Silva, Jose Antônio Rabaca, Jorge Mathias	3:18.46	
	Mexico		DNS	
