= Czechoslovakia at the 1978 European Athletics Championships =

- WA code: TCH

in Prague
- Competitors: 82
- Medals: Gold 0 Silver 2 Bronze 3 Total 5

European Athletics Championships appearances
- 1934; 1938; 1946; 1950; 1954; 1958; 1962; 1966; 1969; 1971; 1974; 1978; 1982; 1986; 1990

Other related appearances
- Czech Republic (1994–); Slovakia (1994–)

Czechoslovakia sent 82 athletes to the 1978 European Athletics Championships which took place 29 August–3 September 1978 in Prague. Czechoslovakia won five medals at the Championships.

== Medalists ==
Medal	Name	Event
2nd place, silver medalist(s)	Karel Kolář	Men's 400m
2nd place, silver medalist(s)	Helena Fibingerová	Women's shot put
3rd place, bronze medalist(s)	Josef Lomický; František Brečka; Miroslav Tulis; Karel Kolář	Men's 4 × 400 m relay
3rd place, bronze medalist(s)	Imrich Bugár	Men's discus
3rd place, bronze medalist(s)	Jarmila Nygrýnová	Women's long jump
