= Athletics at the 1977 Summer Universiade – Men's 800 metres =

The men's 800 metres event at the 1977 Summer Universiade was held at the Vasil Levski National Stadium in Sofia on 19, 20 and 21 August.

== Medalists ==
| Gold | Silver | Bronze |
|---|---|---|
| Alberto Juantorena; Cuba | Milovan Savić; Yugoslavia | José Marajo; France |

== Results ==
=== Heats ===
| Rank | Heat | Athlete | Nationality | Time | Notes |
|---|---|---|---|---|---|
| 1 | 1 | John Higham | Australia | 1:49.6 | Q |
| 2 | 1 | Aleksandr Goncharov | Soviet Union | 1:49.7 | Q |
| 3 | 1 | Imre Deák-Nagy | Hungary | 1:50.4 | |
| 4 | 1 | Zvi Dauber | Israel | 1:51.1 | |
| 5 | 1 | Andrzej Baron | Poland | 1:51.1 | |
| 6 | 1 | Gerhard Trabert | West Germany | 1:52.6 | |
| 1 | 2 | Alberto Juantorena | Cuba | 1:48.4 | Q |
| 2 | 2 | Agberto Guimarães | Brazil | 1:48.6 | Q |
| 3 | 2 | Roger Milhau | France | 1:48.6 | q |
| 4 | 2 | Amar Brahmia | Algeria | 1:48.7 | q |
| 5 | 2 | Toshifumi Shigenari | Japan | 1:49.3 | q |
| 6 | 2 | Jacques Labruyère | Belgium | 1:50.3 | |
| 7 | 2 | Jorge Ortiz | Puerto Rico | 1:50.6 | |
| 8 | 2 | Veselin Kanev | Bulgaria | 1:52.2 | |
| 1 | 3 | Mike Kearns | Great Britain | 1:50.9 | Q |
| 2 | 3 | David Warren | Great Britain | 1:50.9 | Q |
| 3 | 3 | Gabriele Ferraro | Italy | 1:51.1 | |
| 4 | 3 | Gerry Masterson | United States | 1:51.2 | |
| 5 | 3 | Ignacio Melesio | Mexico | 1:51.3 | |
| 5 | 3 | Edwin Attard | Malta | 2:05.3 | |
| 1 | 4 | Milovan Savić | Yugoslavia | 1:51.4 | Q |
| 2 | 4 | Günther Hasler | Liechtenstein | 1:51.6 | Q |
| 3 | 4 | Jamie Botten | Australia | 1:51.9 | |
| 4 | 4 | Maiid Abdi | Tunisia | 1:54.5 | |
| 5 | 4 | K.P. Chandrosena | Sri Lanka | 1:59.6 | |
| 1 | 5 | José Marajo | France | 1:49.2 | Q |
| 2 | 5 | Imre Ötvös Nagy | Hungary | 1:49.4 | Q |
| 3 | 5 | Andrés Ballbé | Spain | 1:49.7 | q |
| 4 | 5 | Leonardo Sorbello | Italy | 1:50.2 | |
| 5 | 5 | Takashi Ishii | Japan | 1:50.4 | |
| 6 | 5 | Karl Schönenberger | Switzerland | 1:51.5 | |
| 7 | 5 | Mohamed Bahloul | Tunisia | 1:55.2 | |
| 1 | 6 | Antoliy Reshetnyak | Soviet Union | 1:53.8 | Q |
| 2 | 6 | Dragan Životić | Yugoslavia | 1:53.9 | Q |
| 3 | 6 | Francisco Gordilo | Spain | 1:54.5 | |

=== Semifinals ===
| Rank | Heat | Athlete | Nationality | Time | Notes |
|---|---|---|---|---|---|
| 1 | 1 | Alberto Juantorena | Cuba | 1:47.9 | Q |
| 2 | 1 | Dragan Životić | Yugoslavia | 1:48.0 | Q |
| 3 | 1 | José Marajo | France | 1:48.1 | Q |
| 4 | 1 | Aleksandr Goncharov | Soviet Union | 1:48.2 | |
| 5 | 1 | Günther Hasler | Liechtenstein | 1:48.2 | |
| 6 | 1 | Amar Brahmia | Algeria | 1:48.9 | |
| 7 | 1 | Toshifumi Shigenari | Japan | 1:51.4 | |
| 1 | 2 | Milovan Savić | Yugoslavia | 1:46.4 | Q |
| 2 | 2 | Antoliy Reshetnyak | Soviet Union | 1:46.5 | Q |
| 3 | 2 | Agberto Guimarães | Brazil | 1:47.0 | Q |
| 4 | 2 | Andrés Ballbé | Spain | 1:47.1 | q |
| 5 | 2 | Imre Ötvös Nagy | Hungary | 1:47.3 | q |
| 6 | 2 | John Higham | Australia | 1:48.1 | |
| | ? | Roger Milhau | France | DNF | |

=== Final ===
| Rank | Athlete | Nationality | Time | Notes |
|---|---|---|---|---|
| 1st place, gold medalist(s) | Alberto Juantorena | Cuba | 1:43.44 | WR |
| 2nd place, silver medalist(s) | Milovan Savić | Yugoslavia | 1:45.6 | |
| 3rd place, bronze medalist(s) | José Marajo | France | 1:45.89 | |
| 4 | Agberto Guimarães | Brazil | 1:46.0 | |
| 5 | Dragan Životić | Yugoslavia | 1:46.9 | |
| 6 | Andrés Ballbé | Spain | 1:47.0 | |
| 7 | Antoliy Reshetnyak | Soviet Union | 1:47.4 | |
| 8 | Imre Ötvös Nagy | Hungary | 1:47.7 | |
