= Athletics at the 1981 Summer Universiade – Men's 800 metres =

The men's 800 metres event at the 1981 Summer Universiade was held at the Stadionul Naţional in Bucharest on 25 and 26 July 1981.

== Medalists ==
Gold	Silver	Bronze
Andreas Hauck; East Germany	Sotirios Moutsanas; Greece	Pavel Troshilo; Soviet Union

== Results ==
=== Heats ===
Held on 25 July

Rank	Heat	Athlete	Nationality	Time	Notes
1	2	Pavel Troshilo	Soviet Union	1:48.66	Q
2	2	Saïd Aouita	Morocco	1:48.90	Q
3	3	Mike White	United States	1:49.20	Q
4	5	Ryszard Ostrowski	Poland	1:49.21	Q
5	2	Gabriele Ferrero	Italy	1:49.24	q
6	5	Dieter Riebe	West Germany	1:49.34	Q
7	5	Mihai Prundeanu	Romania	1:49.36	q
8	3	Sotirios Moutsanas	Greece	1:49.46	Q
9	4	Bárbaro Serrano	Cuba	1:49.56	Q
10	3	Ignacio Melesio	Mexico	1:49.58	q
11	4	Scott Clark	United States	1:49.73	Q
12	2	Kim Bok-joo	South Korea	1:49.91	q
13	2	Sun Zhihuai	China	1:49.95	
14	4	José María Nombela	Spain	1:50.04	
15	1	Andreas Hauck	East Germany	1:50.27	Q
16	2	Margarit Valkov	Bulgaria	1:50.28	
17	1	Stefano Cecchini	Italy	1:50.39	Q
18	4	Manfred Nellesen	West Germany	1:50.43	
19	1	Spyros Spyrou	Greece	1:50.71	
20	6	Amar Brahmia	Algeria	1:51.34	Q
21	6	Nicolae Onescu	Romania	1:51.45	Q
21	6	Dragan Životić	Yugoslavia	1:51.45	Q
23	4	Peter O'Donoghue	New Zealand	1:51.70	
24	6	Félix Mesa	Cuba	1:51.78	
25	5	José Luis Esquivel	Mexico	1:52.07	
26	6	Leszek Witkowski	Poland	1:52.13	
27	2	Mohamed Ayad	Iraq	1:52.96	
28	6	Ghislain Obounghat	Congo	1:53.12	
29	3	Mohamed Makhlouf	Syria	1:53.55	
30	6	Salem Al-Margini	Libya	1:55.01	
31	2	Cornelius Pesurnay	Indonesia	1:56.43	
32	4	Didier Le Guillou	France	1:58.49	
33	4	Edwin Attard	Malta	2:01.67	
34	5	Paul Caruana	Malta	2:02.96	
35	1	Fadi Rahme	Lebanon	2:04.80	
36	5	Mohamed Mabrouk	Libya	2:16.41	
	?	Gregor Hagmann	Switzerland	DNF	

=== Semifinals ===
Held on 26 July

Rank	Heat	Athlete	Nationality	Time	Notes
1	1	Pavel Troshilo	Soviet Union	1:49.06	Q
2	1	Sotirios Moutsanas	Greece	1:49.21	Q
3	2	Amar Brahmia	Algeria	1:49.25	Q
4	2	Mike White	United States	1:49.28	Q
5	2	Saïd Aouita	Morocco	1:49.35	Q
6	1	Andreas Hauck	East Germany	1:49.37	Q
7	1	Nicolae Onescu	Romania	1:49.46	Q
8	2	Mihai Prundeanu	Romania	1:49.58	Q
9	2	Dieter Riebe	West Germany	1:49.77	
10	1	Scott Clark	United States	1:49.87	
11	2	Ignacio Melesio	Mexico	1:49.94	
12	1	Bárbaro Serrano	Cuba	1:50.06	
13	2	Stefano Cecchini	Italy	1:50.08	
14	1	Dragan Životić	Yugoslavia	1:50.15	
15	1	Ryszard Ostrowski	Poland	1:50.58	
16	1	Gabriele Ferrero	Italy	1:51.61	
17	2	Kim Bok-joo	South Korea	1:53.12	

=== Final ===
Held on 26 July

Rank	Athlete	Nationality	Time	Notes
1st place, gold medalist(s)	Andreas Hauck	East Germany	1:50.12	
2nd place, silver medalist(s)	Sotirios Moutsanas	Greece	1:50.20	
3rd place, bronze medalist(s)	Pavel Troshilo	Soviet Union	1:50.26	
4	Mike White	United States	1:50.32	
5	Amar Brahmia	Algeria	1:50.46	
6	Nicolae Onescu	Romania	1:50.48	
7	Saïd Aouita	Morocco	1:50.49	
8	Mihai Prundeanu	Romania	1:52.55	
