= Athletics at the 1981 Summer Universiade – Men's 1500 metres =

The men's 1500 metres event at the 1981 Summer Universiade was held at the Stadionul Naţional in Bucharest on 21 and 22 July 1981.

== Medalists ==
Gold	Silver	Bronze
Saïd Aouita; Morocco	Vinko Pokrajčić; Yugoslavia	Amar Brahmia; Algeria

== Results ==
=== Heats ===
Rank	Heat	Athlete	Nationality	Time	Notes
1	2	Abdarrahman Morcelli	Algeria	3:44.75	Q
2	3	Andreas Hauck	East Germany	3:44.82	Q
3	3	Nicolae Onescu	Romania	3:44.90	Q
4	3	Ralf Eckert	West Germany	3:44.97	Q
5	3	Franco Boffi	Italy	3:45.48	Q
6	3	Steve Foley	Australia	3:45.53	q
7	2	Claudio Patrignani	Italy	3:45.68	Q
8	3	Håkan Kaneberg	Sweden	3:45.90	q
9	2	Manfred Nellesen	West Germany	3:45.95	Q
10	2	Dan Aldridge	United States	3:46.14	Q
11	2	Sergey Astapenko	Soviet Union	3:46.17	q
12	1	Vinko Pokrajčić	Yugoslavia	3:47.28	Q
13	1	Jim Spivey	United States	3:47.48	Q
14	1	Saïd Aouita	Morocco	3:47.52	Q
15	3	Leszek Witkowski	Poland	3:47.76	
16	1	Amar Brahmia	Algeria	3:47.92	Q
17	2	Sun Zhihuai	China	3:47.97	
18	1	Peter O'Donoghue	New Zealand	3:48.31	
19	2	Ignacio Melesio	Mexico	3:48.74	
20	2	Nicolae Damean	Romania	3:48.98	
21	1	Tsukasa Endo	Japan	3:48.99	
22	3	Félix Mesa	Cuba	3:50.05	
23	2	Mohamed Ayad	Iraq	3:52.20	
24	2	Ghislain Obounghat	Congo	3:54.65	
25	3	José Luis Esquivel	Mexico	3:55.56	
26	1	Kim Bok-joo	South Korea	3:56.90	
27	3	Mohamed Makhlouf	Syria	3:59.53	
28	2	Mohamed Kolo	Nigeria	4:00.85	
29	2	Salem Al-Margini	Libya	4:01.07	
30	3	Edwin Attard	Malta	4:09.73	
31	1	Cornelius Pesurnay	Indonesia	4:13.04	
32	1	Sadahida Sadahida	Libya	4:36.32	
	1	Necdet Ayaz	Turkey	DNF	
	1	Ahmed Hassoune	Lebanon	DNF	
	1	Ali Hufane	Somalia	DNF	
	1	Margarit Valkov	Bulgaria	DNF	

=== Final ===
Rank	Athlete	Nationality	Time	Notes
1st place, gold medalist(s)	Saïd Aouita	Morocco	3:38.43	UR
2nd place, silver medalist(s)	Vinko Pokrajčić	Yugoslavia	3:39.83	
3rd place, bronze medalist(s)	Amar Brahmia	Algeria	3:39.85	
4	Jim Spivey	United States	3:40.12	
5	Abdarrahman Morcelli	Algeria	3:40.42	
6	Andreas Hauck	East Germany	3:40.62	
7	Sergey Astapenko	Soviet Union	3:40.94	
8	Claudio Patrignani	Italy	3:40.97	
9	Dan Aldridge	United States	3:41.02	
10	Ralf Eckert	Germany	3:41.46	
11	Franco Boffi	Italy	3:41.84	
12	Nicolae Onescu	Romania	3:41.87	
13	Steve Foley	Australia	3:43.83	
14	Håkan Kaneberg	Sweden	3:44.76	
15	Manfred Nellesen	West Germany	3:46.58	
