= Dragan Životić =

Serbian athlete (born 1955)

Personal information
- Nationality: Serbian
- Born: 3 March 1955 (age 71) Belgrade, Yugoslavia

Sport
- Sport: Track and field
- Event: 800 metres
- Club: Partizan Belgrade
Medal record
Representing Yugoslavia
Mediterranean Games
Gold medal – first place	1979 Split	800 metres
Summer Universiade
Silver medal – second place	1975 Rome	4 × 400 metres relay

Dragan Životić (born 3 March 1955) is a Serbian athlete who specialized in the 800 metres in addition to 4 × 400 metres relay. He is best known as the 1979 Mediterranean Games champion and championship record holder in the 800 metres.

== Career ==
Životić played football as an adolescent before entering Partizan Belgrade's athletics department. Here he was coached by Franjo Mihalić and later Željko Leskovac.

Životić finished fifth at the 1977 Summer Universiade (a race in which Alberto Juantorena set a world record) second at the 1979 European Cup "A" Final and seventh at the 1978 European Championships.

In 1979, he ran in 1:45.74 minutes to finish sixth at the Weltklasse Zürich meet. He was subsequently chosen as SR Serbia's flagbearer at the 1979 Mediterranean Games, which were held in Split in his homecountry of Yugoslavia. Against a championship record of 1:47.6, Životić smashed it as he won the 800 metres race in 1:45.20 minutes.

1:45.20 was the Serbian record until 1988 and the Mediterranean Games record until 2013, when it was beaten by Kenyan İlham Tanui Özbilen running for Turkey.

Životić also became Yugoslavian champion in 1977 and 1981, both times breaking a winning streak of Milovan Savić. The same thing happened as Životić won the 1979 Balkan Championships, which Savić had won both before and after. Furthermore, Životić competed individually at the 1975 Summer Universiade and the 1981 Summer Universiade without reaching the final.

In the 4 × 400 metres relay, he won a silver medal at the 1975 Summer Universiade, finished fourth at the 1977 Summer Universiade and eighth at the 1978 European Championships.

He sustained an injury in May 1980, ruling him out of the 1980 Olympics. For the same reason he missed the 1983 World Championships, retiring in 1984. After retiring, he was a team manager and coach for national teams as well as president of Partizan. He was also a professor of sports management at Singidunum University.
