= Spyros Spyrou (runner) =

Cypriot middle-distance runner

Personal information
- Nationality: Cypriot
- Born: 6 June 1958 (age 68) Palaikythro
- Height: 181 cm (5 ft 11 in)
- Weight: 67 kg (148 lb)

Sport
- Country: Cyprus
- Sport: Middle-distance running

Achievements and titles
- Personal best: 800 m: 1:47.17 NR
Medal record
Games of the Small States of Europe
Gold medal – first place	1989 Nicosia	800 m
Gold medal – first place	1989 Nicosia	1500 m

Spyros Spyrou (Greek: Σπύρος Σπύρου; born 6 June 1958) is a Cypriot middle-distance runner who competed in the 800 metres and the 1500 metres. He represented his country in the men's 1500 metres and the men's 800 metres at the 1988 Summer Olympics. He was a semi-finalist in the 1500 m, ranking tenth. After his active career he became a athletics coach, coaching several international athletes. He is regarded as one of the best Cypriot coaches.

== Biography ==
Born in Palaikythro, he competed in sports from a young age and graduated from the National Academy of Physical Education in Cyprus. He later married fellow Cypriot runn Dora Kyriakou, having a son, Stavros. He works as an athletics coach at GSP Stadium.

He represented Cyprus internationally at the 1983 World Championships in Athletics, the European Athletics Championships (1982 and 1986), the 1982 Commonwealth Games, and the 1986 IAAF World Cross Country Championships. In his final appearance at an international competition, he won gold in both the 800 m and 1500 m at the 1989 Games of the Small States of Europe held in his native Nicosia. His winning time of 1:51.51 minutes in the 800 m was a Games record.

Spyrou is the Cypriot national record holder in the 800 metres, with his best of 1:47.17 minutes standing since 1983 with his run at the 1983 Mediterranean Games. This is one of the longest-standing national records for the sport in Cyprus.

Spyrou became after his athletics career a athletics coach. He coaches his son Stavros, who broke the Cypriot under-23 record for the 800 metres. He also serves as the national distance running coach for Cyprus, and coached Cypriot record holder Natalia Evangelidou. His coaching group achieved first place in both men's and women's sections of the national championships in 2019. He is regarded as one of the best Cypriot coaches.

== International competitions ==
Representing Cyprus
Year	Competition	Venue	Position	Event	Result	Notes
1981	Universiade	Bucharest, Romania	3rd (h)	800 m	1:50.71	
1982	European Championships	Athens, Greece	5th (h)	800 m	1:49.11	
1982	Commonwealth Games	Brisbane, Australia	6th	800 m	1:47.64	
1982	Commonwealth Games	Brisbane, Australia	5th (h)	1500 m	3:47.37	
1983	World Championships	Helsinki, Finland	9th (h)	1500 m	3:43.94	
1983	Mediterranean Games	Casablanca, Morocco	5th	800 m	1:52.60	
1986	World Cross Country Championships	Neuchâtel, Switzerland	277th	Senior race	41:06.9	
1986	World Cross Country Championships	Neuchâtel, Switzerland	37th	Senior team	1591 pts	
1986	European Championships	Stuttgart, West Germany	7th	800 m	1:53.36	
1988	Olympic Games	Seoul, South Korea	5th (h)	800 m	1:49.84	
1988	Olympic Games	Seoul, South Korea	10th (sf)	1500 m	3:43.49	
1989	Games of the Small States of Europe	Nicosia, Cyprus	1st	800 m	1:51.51	GR
1989	Games of the Small States of Europe	Nicosia, Cyprus	1st	1500 m	3:52.35	
