= 1978 European Athletics Championships – Men's 4 × 400 metres relay =

Men's 4 × 400 metres relay at the European Athletics Championships

The men's 4 × 400 metres relay at the 1978 European Athletics Championships was held in Prague, then Czechoslovakia, at Stadion Evžena Rošického on 2 and 3 September 1978.

== Medalists ==
| Gold | Martin Weppler; Franz-Peter Hofmeister; Bernd Herrmann; Harald Schmid; West Germany |
| Silver | Jerzy Włodarczyk; Zbigniew Jaremski; Cezary Łapiński; Ryszard Podlas; Poland |
| Bronze | Josef Lomický; František Břečka; Miroslav Tulis; Karel Kolář; Czechoslovakia |

== Results ==
=== Final ===
3 September

| Rank | Nation | Competitors | Time | Notes |
|---|---|---|---|---|
| 1st place, gold medalist(s) | West Germany | Martin Weppler; Franz-Peter Hofmeister; Bernd Herrmann; Harald Schmid | 3:02.03 | CR |
| 2nd place, silver medalist(s) | Poland | Jerzy Włodarczyk; Zbigniew Jaremski; Cezary Łapiński; Ryszard Podlas | 3:03.62 | |
| 3rd place, bronze medalist(s) | Czechoslovakia | Josef Lomický; František Břečka; Miroslav Tulis; Karel Kolář | 3:03.99 | |
| 4 | Switzerland | Rolf Strittmatter; Peter Haas; Konstantin Vogt; Rolf Gisler | 3:04.29 | |
| 5 | East Germany | Frank Richter; Günther Arnold; Andreas Busse; Jürgen Pfennig | 3:04.39 | |
| 6 | France | Maurice Volmar; Gérard Bouttier; Hector Llatser; Francis Demarthon | 3:05.63 | |
| 7 | Italy | Roberto Tozzi; Daniele Zanini; Stefano Malinverni; Pietro Mennea | 3:06.7 | |
| 8 | Yugoslavia | Rok Kopitar; Dragan Životić; Milovan Savić; Željko Knapić | 3:06.9 | |

=== Heats ===
2 September

==== Heat 1 ====
| Rank | Nation | Competitors | Time | Notes |
|---|---|---|---|---|
| 1 | Poland | Jerzy Włodarczyk; Zbigniew Jaremski; Cezary Łapiński; Ryszard Podlas | 3:06.45 | Q |
| 2 | Switzerland | Rolf Strittmatter; Peter Haas; Konstantin Vogt; Rolf Gisler | 3:06.6 | Q |
| 3 | Czechoslovakia | Miroslav Tulis; Josef Lomický; František Břečka; Karel Kolář | 3:07.1 | Q |
| 4 | Netherlands | Raymond Heerenveen; Koen Gijsbers; Marcel Klarenbeek; Harry Schulting | 3:07.6 | |
| 5 | Belgium | Eddy De Leeuw; Jacques Borlée; Rik Hermans; Rik Vandenberghe | 3:08.0 | |
| 6 | Great Britain | Terry Whitehead; Glen Cohen; David Jenkins; Richard Ashton | 3:39.9 | |

==== Heat 2 ====
| Rank | Nation | Competitors | Time | Notes |
|---|---|---|---|---|
| 1 | West Germany | Martin Weppler; Franz-Peter Hofmeister; Bernd Herrmann; Harald Schmid | 3:05.97 | Q |
| 2 | Italy | Roberto Tozzi; Daniele Zanini; Stefano Malinverni; Pietro Mennea | 3:06.5 | Q |
| 3 | France | Maurice Volmar; Gérard Bouttier; Hector Llatser; Francis Demarthon | 3:06.6 | Q |
| 4 | East Germany | Frank Richter; Günther Arnold; Andreas Busse; Jürgen Pfennig | 3:06.8 | q |
| 5 | Yugoslavia | Rok Kopitar; Dragan Životić; Milovan Savić; Željko Knapić | 3:07.1 | q |
| | Finland | Heikki Hämäläinen; Markku Kukkoaho; Antti Rajamäki; Markku Taskinen | DNF | |

== Participation ==
According to an unofficial count, 48 athletes from 12 countries participated in the event.

- Belgium (4)
- Czechoslovakia (4)
- East Germany (4)
- Finland (4)
- France (4)
- Italy (4)
- Netherlands (4)
- Poland (4)
- Switzerland (4)
- Great Britain (4)
- West Germany (4)
- Yugoslavia (4)
