= Athletics at the Islamic Games =

I Islamic Games
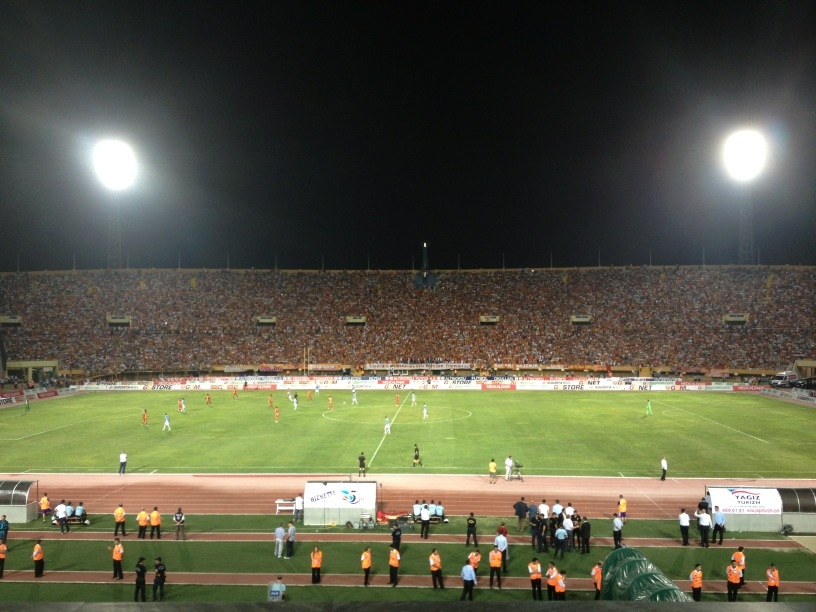
- The host stadium in 2012
- Dates: 28 September to 5 October 1980
- Host city: İzmir, Turkey
- Venue: İzmir Atatürk Stadium
- Events: 30

The athletics competition at the 1980 Islamic Games was held at the İzmir Atatürk Stadium in İzmir, Turkey between 28 September and 5 October 1980. This was the second major athletics event to be staged at the stadium, following the athletics at the 1971 Mediterranean Games. A total of thirty athletics events were contested, twenty-one for men and nine for women. While the men's programme was well attended, the women's events attracted very few entries, with Turkish female track athletes composing the bulk of the competitors. Women's athletics in the Arab world particularly was at an early stage of development – only a year earlier had women's events been introduced at the Arab Athletics Championships and the African Championships in Athletics been launched.

The results of the competition were not of a high international standard, but this was a key purpose of the gathering, as it allowed Muslim nations not traditionally strong in track and field to engage with peers of a similar standard. The host nation Turkey was easily the most dominant in the sport, winning fourteen of the thirty events on offer. Morocco was the next most successful nation, with five golds. Algeria performed well in the distance running events, taking three golds, and Saudi Arabia gave a similar performance in the sprints, also taking three golds. Ten nations made it to the medal table.

Going into the competition, the most prominent athletes were Algeria's Rachid Habchaoui and Turkey's Mehmet Terzi, both of whom had won long-distance running medals at the 1979 Mediterranean Games. Habchaoui took a long-distance track double in the 5000 metres and 10,000 metres, while Terzi was the marathon winner and 10,000 m runner-up. Olympic steeplechase finalist Lahcene Babaci was the winner of his event and, another Algerian, middle-distance running specialist Amar Brahmia was well established, having won multiple medals at the 1978 All-Africa Games. However, it was the efforts of two young athletes who rose to prominence by winning their first major titles here that had the greatest impact on Islamic athletics. Brahmia was beaten in both the 800 metres and 1500 metres by twenty-one-year-old Saïd Aouita, who would later go on to win one of Morocco's first Olympic gold medals, alongside Nawal El Moutawakel, at the 1984 Summer Olympics. Nineteen-year-old Ahmed Hamada Jassim of Bahrain was the other athlete to emerge internationally at this competition: after winning the 400 metres hurdles he went on to be one of Asia's foremost athletes in the event and was the champion at the 1986 Asian Games.

== Medal summary ==
=== Men ===
Event	Gold		Silver		Bronze	
100 metres	Omar Ghizlat (MAR)	10.75	Arim Jamian (MAS)	11.02	Sükrü Çaprazli (TUR)	11.03
200 metres	Abduljalil Othman Bakour (KSA)	21.95	Allah Taoufik (MAR)	22.24	Murat Akman (TUR)	22.31
400 metres	Hassan Abdulkarim (KSA)	48.79	Bachir Fellah (LBA)	49.45	Murat Akman (TUR)	50.03
800 metres	Saïd Aouita (MAR)	1:52.06	Amar Brahmia (ALG)	1:52.72	Sermet Timurlenk (TUR)	1:53.33
1500 metres	Saïd Aouita (MAR)	3:51.26	Amar Brahmia (ALG)	3:51.74	Sermet Timurlenk (TUR)	3:54.32
5000 metres	Rachid Habchaoui (ALG)	14:17.27	Bayram Sahin (TUR)	14:49.14	Mongi Mohamed Abdullah (LBA)	14:49.42
10,000 metres	Rachid Habchaoui (ALG)	29:32.4	Mehmet Terzi (TUR)	29:53.8	Mohamed Naoumi (MAR)	30:14.0
110 metres hurdles	Ahmed Chiboub (MAR)	14.65	Ilhan Agirbas (TUR)	14.74	Lee Wai Yin (MAS)	15.00
400 metres hurdles	Ahmed Hamada Jassim (BHR)	52.46	Javed Akhtar (PAK)	53.26	Ahmed Chiboub (MAR)	53.95
3000 metres steeplechase	Lahcene Babaci (ALG)	8:56.0	Yusuf Sögütlü (TUR)	9:30.2	Saad Hamada Mubarak (BHR)	9:40.4
4×100 metres relay	Saudi Arabia (KSA)	41.36	Turkey (TUR)	42.06	Bahrain (BHR)	42.17
4×400 metres relay	Turkey (TUR)	3:17.82	Bahrain (BHR)	3:20.04	Saudi Arabia (KSA)	3:24.46
Marathon	Mehmet Terzi (TUR)	2:26:02	Ahmet Altun (TUR)	2:28:35	Nimri Naim (LBA)	2:47:45
High jump	Ekrem Özdamar (TUR)	2.10 m	Hamid Sahil (ALG)	2.05 m	Ho Yoon Wah (MAS)	2.05 m
Pole vault	Tayfun Aygün (TUR)	4.50 m	Mohamed Bensaad (ALG)	4.30 m	Rihan Ali Rihan Obeid (KSA)	4.20 m
Long jump	Mohamed Abdusalam Bishti (LBA)	7.11 m	Tayfun Demiralay (TUR)	6.97 m	Nasib Gul (PAK)	6.69 m
Triple jump	Temel Erbek (TUR)	15.31 m	Nasib Gul (PAK)	14.97 m	Mujibar Rahman Malik (BAN)	14.54 m
Shot put	Mohamed Fatihi (MAR)	16.66 m	Ali Mohammed Saad (BHR)	15.68 m	Tayfun Esmer (TUR)	14.68 m
Discus throw	Mohammed Majid (BHR)	44.88 m	Osman Nuri Karabiyik (TUR)	44.80 m	Milad Ahmed Hassan (LBA)	44.08 m
Hammer throw	Ugur Sel (TUR)	56.28 m	Abdellah Boubekeur (ALG)	54.90 m	Ghulam Noorani (PAK)	54.00 m
Javelin throw	Muhammad Munir (PAK)	71.36 m	Mohamed Karakhi (MAR)	65.58 m	Mesfer Al-Khani (KSA)	64.26 m

=== Women ===
Event	Gold		Silver		Bronze
100 metres	Semra Aksu (TUR)	12.80	Not awarded		Not awarded
200 metres	Esen Özgeren (TUR)	25.91	Not awarded		Not awarded
800 metres	Nurten Kara (TUR)	2:16.14	Tülay Öztas (TUR)	2:18.64	Not awarded
1500 metres	Ülker Kutlu (TUR)	4:36.37	Not awarded		Not awarded
3000 metres	Ülker Kutlu (TUR)	10:04.18	Not awarded		Not awarded
100 metres hurdles	Semra Aksu (TUR)	14.75	Boon Ma Aroonaratna (MAS)	14.78	Not awarded
400 metres hurdles	Ayse Özkol (TUR)	65.9	Not awarded		Not awarded
Long jump	Gül Teksoy (TUR)	5.35	Noreen Pereira (MAS)	5.32	Not awarded
Discus throw	Perican Bayer (TRNC)	35.44	Not awarded		Not awarded

== Medal table ==
* Host nation (Turkey)

Rank	Nation	Gold	Silver	Bronze	Total
1	Turkey (TUR)*	14	9	6	29
2	Morocco (MAR)	5	2	2	9
3	Algeria (ALG)	3	5	0	8
4	Saudi Arabia (KSA)	3	0	3	6
5	Bahrain (BHR)	2	2	2	6
6	Pakistan (PAK)	1	2	2	5
7	Libya (LBA)	1	1	3	5
8	Northern Cyprus (TRNC)	1	0	0	1
9	Malaysia (MAS)	0	3	2	5
10	Bangladesh (BAN)	0	0	1	1
Totals (10 entries)		30	24	21	75
