= 1978 European Athletics Indoor Championships – Men's 400 metres =

The men's 400 metres event at the 1978 European Athletics Indoor Championships was held on 11 and 12 March in Milan.

== Medalists ==
Gold	Silver	Bronze
Pietro Mennea; Italy	Ryszard Podlas; Poland	Nikolay Chernetskiy; Soviet Union

== Results ==
=== Heats ===
First 2 from each heat (Q) qualified directly for the semifinals.

Rank	Heat	Name	Nationality	Time	Notes
1	2	Nikolay Chernetskiy	Soviet Union	47.20	Q
2	2	Ryszard Podlas	Poland	47.80	Q
3	3	Alfonso Di Guida	Italy	47.96	Q
4	3	Karel Kolář	Czechoslovakia	47.96	Q
5	3	Narzis Popov	Bulgaria	48.19	
6	2	Eddy De Leeuw	Belgium	48.34	
7	4	Pietro Mennea	Italy	48.40	Q
8	4	Željko Knapić	Yugoslavia	48.55	Q
9	1	Nándor Hornyacsek	Hungary	48.64	Q
9	2	Yanko Bratanov	Bulgaria	48.64	
11	1	Vasiliy Arkhipenko	Soviet Union	48.79	Q
12	1	Giovanni Bongiorni	Italy	48.79	
13	4	Pavel Pavlov	Bulgaria	48.83	

=== Semifinals ===
First 2 from each heat (Q) qualified directly for the final.

Rank	Heat	Name	Nationality	Time	Notes
1	2	Ryszard Podlas	Poland	47.08	Q
2	2	Pietro Mennea	Italy	47.16	Q
3	1	Nikolay Chernetskiy	Soviet Union	47.29	Q
4	1	Željko Knapić	Yugoslavia	47.61	Q
5	2	Vasiliy Arkhipenko	Soviet Union	47.71	
6	1	Alfonso Di Guida	Italy	47.86	
7	1	Nándor Hornyacsek	Hungary	48.06	
8	2	Karel Kolář	Czechoslovakia	48.62	

=== Final ===
Rank	Lane	Name	Nationality	Time	Notes
1st place, gold medalist(s)	2	Pietro Mennea	Italy	46.51	
2nd place, silver medalist(s)	4	Ryszard Podlas	Poland	46.55	
3rd place, bronze medalist(s)	3	Nikolay Chernetskiy	Soviet Union	46.72	
4	1	Željko Knapić	Yugoslavia	47.83	
