= Miroslav Tulis =

Czech sprinter

Medal record

Men's athletics

Representing Czechoslovakia

European Championships
Bronze medal – third place	1978 Prague	4×400 m

Miroslav Tulis (born 23 January 1951 in Šumperk) is a Czech former track and field sprinter who competed internationally for Czechoslovakia.

He was a 200 metres and 400 metres runner and represented Czechoslovakia in 19 international competitions.

He was the bronze medallist at the 1978 European Athletics Championships together with Josef Lomický, František Břečka and Karel Kolář.

At national level, in the 400 metres he established Czechoslovak record of 46.33 seconds on 27 August 1977 in Ostrava. He was a nine-time champion at the Czechoslovak Athletics Championships.

He is active in Ministry of Defence & Armed Forces of the Czech Republic.

== International competitions ==
Year	Competition	Venue	Position	Event	Notes
1978	European Championships	Prague, Czechoslovakia	3rd	4 × 400 m relay	

== National titles ==
Year	Competition	Venue	Position	Event	Notes
1971	1971 Outdoor		1st	400 m	
1971	1971 Outdoor		1st	4 × 400 m relay	
1972	1972 Outdoor		1st	400 m	
1972	1972 Outdoor		1st	4 × 400 m relay	
1974	1974 Outdoor		1st	400 m	
1974	1974 Outdoor		1st	4 × 400 m relay	
1974	1974 Indoor		1st	300 m	
1977	1977 Outdoor		1st	400 m	
1977	1977 Outdoor		1st	4 × 400 m relay	
1978	1978 Outdoor		2nd	400 m	
