= Carlos Noroña =

Cuban athlete

Personal information
- Full name: Carlos Noroña Gutiérrez
- Nationality: Cuban
- Born: 14 October 1956 (age 69)

Sport
- Sport: Sprinting
- Event: 400 metres

Carlos Noroña Gutiérrez (born 14 October 1956) is a Cuban sprinter. He competed in the men's 400 metres at the 1976 Summer Olympics.
