= Javier Martínez (sprinter) =

Spanish sprinter

Personal information
- Nationality: Spanish
- Born: 1 January 1953 (age 73) Barcelona, Spain

Sport
- Sport: Sprinting
- Event: 4 × 100 metres relay
Medal record
Representing Spain
Mediterranean Games
Bronze medal – third place	1975 Algiers	4x100m relay

Javier Martínez Giménez (born 1 January 1953) is a Spanish sprinter. He competed in the men's 4 × 100 metres relay at the 1976 Summer Olympics.
