= Ricardo Larios =

Nicaraguan sprinter

Personal information
- Nationality: Nicaraguan
- Born: 10 November 1952 (age 73)

Sport
- Sport: Sprinting
- Event: 400 metres

Ricardo Larios (born 10 November 1952) is a Nicaraguan sprinter. He competed in the men's 400 metres at the 1976 Summer Olympics.
