= Evis Jennings =

American sprinter

Personal information
- Born: July 11, 1955 (age 70) Mississippi, United States

Sport
- Sport: Track and field
Medal record
Representing United States
Summer Universiade
Gold medal – first place	1977 Sofia	4x400m relay

Evis Jennings (born July 11, 1955) is an American retired sprinter. Running for Mississippi State University, he was the 1976 NCAA Indoor Champion at 440 yards.

He contested the 400 m at the 1976 United States Olympic Trials and finished seventh. His personal record for the distance was 45.4 seconds, which ranked him 11th fastest in the world in the 1974 season.

== International competitions ==
Year	Competition	Venue	Position	Event	Notes
1977	Universiade	Sofia Bulgaria	4th	400 m	45.95
1977	Universiade	Sofia Bulgaria	1st	4 × 400 m relay	3:01.2 GR
