= Samba Dièye =

Senegalese sprinter

Personal information
- Nationality: Senegalese
- Born: 11 July 1949 (age 77)

Sport
- Sport: Sprinting
- Event: 400 metres

Samba Dièye (born 11 July 1949) is a Senegalese sprinter. He competed in the men's 400 metres at the 1976 Summer Olympics.
