= Giorgio Ballati =

Italian sprinter

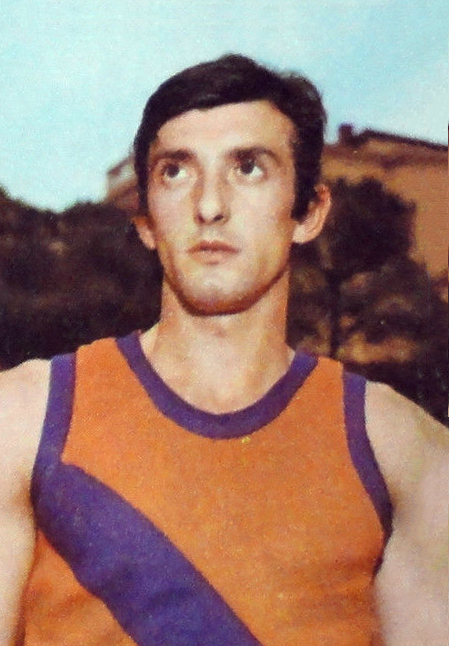

Personal information
- Born: 2 April 1946 (age 80) Pistoia, Italy
- Height: 1.79 m (5 ft 10 in)
- Weight: 64 kg (141 lb)

Sport
- Sport: Athletics
- Event: 400 m hurdles
- Club: Atletica Pistoia

Achievements and titles
- Personal best: 400 mH – 50.25 s (1974)
Medal record
Representing Italy
Mediterranean Games
Bronze medal – third place	1975 Algiers	4×400 m relay

Giorgio Ballati (born 2 April 1946) is a retired Italian sprinter who won a bronze medal in the 4 × 400 m relay at the 1975 Mediterranean Games. He competed at the 1972 Olympics in the 400 m hurdles, but failed to reach the final.
