= Željko Knapić =

Croatian sprinter

Personal information
- Born: 26 March 1957 (age 69) Čakovec, Yugoslavia
- Height: 1.74 m (5 ft 9 in)
- Weight: 67 kg (148 lb)

Sport
- Sport: Athletics
- Event: 400 metres
- Club: AK Sloboda Varaždin
Medal record
Representing Yugoslavia
Mediterranean Games
Silver medal – second place	1979 Split	4x400m relay
Bronze medal – third place	1983 Casablanca	400m

Željko Knapić (born 26 March 1957) is a Croatian retired sprinter who represented former Yugoslavia in the 400 metres. He competed at the 1980 Summer Olympics in the 4 × 400 metres relay without qualifying for the final. In addition, he won two medals at the Mediterranean Games. He still holds Croatian records in the 200 and 400 metres.

== International competitions ==
Year	Competition	Venue	Position	Event	Notes
Representing Yugoslavia
1975	European Junior Championships	Athens, Greece	5th	400 m	47.59
1975	European Junior Championships	Athens, Greece	8th	4 × 400 m relay	3:15.2
1977	Universiade	Sofia, Bulgaria	10th (sf)	400 m	47.04
1977	Universiade	Sofia, Bulgaria	4th	4 × 400 m relay	3:06.5
1978	European Indoor Championships	Milan, Italy	4th	400 m	47.83
1978	European Championships	Prague, Czechoslovakia	18th (h)	400 m	47.51
1978	European Championships	Prague, Czechoslovakia	8th	4 × 400 m relay	3:06.9
1979	European Indoor Championships	Vienna, Austria	7th (sf)	400 m	47.72
1979	Mediterranean Games	Split, Yugoslavia	4th	400 m	46.42
1979	Mediterranean Games	Split, Yugoslavia	2nd	4 × 400 m relay	3:04.33
1980	Olympic Games	Moscow, Soviet Union	7th (h)	4 × 400 m relay	3:05.3
1982	European Indoor Championships	Milan, Italy	4th	400 m	47.46
1982	European Championships	Athens, Greece	7th	400 m	46.20
1982	European Championships	Athens, Greece	10th (h)	4 × 400 m relay	3:08.44
1983	Mediterranean Games	Casablanca, Morocco	3rd	400 m	45.95
1983	Mediterranean Games	Casablanca, Morocco	4th	4 × 400 m relay	3:07.00
1986	European Championships	Stuttgart, West Germany	23rd (h)	400 m	47.81
1986	European Championships	Stuttgart, West Germany	7th	4 × 400 m relay	3:05.27
1987	European Indoor Championships	Liévin, France	18th (h)	400 m	48.54
1988	European Indoor Championships	Budapest, Hungary	10th (sf)	400 m	47.56

== Personal bests ==
Outdoor

- 200 metres – 20.76 (0.0 m/s, Sarajevo 1981) NR
- 400 metres – 45.64 (Sarajevo 1981) NR

Indoor

- 200 metres – 21.40 (Vienna 1983)
- 400 metres – 46.56 (Vienna 1988)
