= Peter Grant (athlete) =

Australian sprinter (born 1954)

Personal information
- Nationality: Australian
- Born: 5 January 1954 (age 72)
- Height: 180 cm (5 ft 11 in)
- Weight: 70 kg (154 lb)

Sport
- Sport: Athletics
- Event: Sprinting/400m/hurdles
- Club: Box Hill Athletic Club

Peter Treacy Grant (born 5 January 1954) is an Australian sprinter. He competed in the men's 400 metres at the 1976 Summer Olympics.

Grant finished second behind Ed Moses in the 400 metres hurdles event at the British 1979 AAA Championships.
