= René Metz =

French sprinter

Personal information
- Nationality: French
- Born: 18 December 1950 (age 75) Paris, France

Sport
- Sport: Sprinting
- Event: 200 metres
Medal record
Representing France
Mediterranean Games
Gold medal – first place	1975 Algiers	4x100m relay
Bronze medal – third place	1975 Algiers	100m

René Metz (born 18 December 1950) is a French sprinter. He competed in the men's 200 metres at the 1972 Summer Olympics.
