= Athletics at the 1976 Summer Olympics – Men's 400 metres =

Men's 400 metres at the Games of the XXI Olympiad
- Venue: Olympic Stadium
- Date: 26 July 1976 (heats and quarterfinals); 28 July 1976 (semifinals); 29 July 1976 (final)
- Competitors: 44 from 29 nations
- Winning time: 44.26

Medalists
1st place, gold medalist(s)		Alberto Juantorena; Cuba
2nd place, silver medalist(s)		Fred Newhouse; United States
3rd place, bronze medalist(s)		Herman Frazier; United States

The men's 400 metres was an event at the 1976 Summer Olympics in Montreal. The competition was held on July 26, 28, and 29, 1976. Forty-four athletes from 29 nations competed. The maximum number of athletes per nation had been set at 3 since the 1930 Olympic Congress. The event was won by 0.14 seconds by Alberto Juantorena of Cuba, the nation's first medal in the event, breaking a string of five victories by the United States. Juantorena became the first man to win both the 800 metres and 400 metres in an Olympics. His winning time of 44.26 seconds remained as the fastest time at sea level until it was broken by Butch Reynolds in May 1987 in Columbus, Ohio.

== Summary ==
In the final, Fred Newhouse and Maxie Parks appeared to go for the early lead, while Alberto Juantorena was initially a little slower. Then he stretched out on the backstretch to regain position about equal to the third American Herman Frazier. Coming off the final turn Juantorena had caught the rest of the field and was a step behind Newhouse. Parks and Fons Brijdenbach were about even two more strides back with Frazier just behind them. As Juantorena began to pass Newhouse, Newhouse noticeably struggled, leaving Juantorena with the gold medal. Three metres back, Frazier just edged ahead of Brijdenbach for the bronze medal, as Parks faded.

== Background ==
This was the eighteenth appearance of the event, which is one of 12 athletics events to have been held at every Summer Olympics. Two finalists, but no medalists, from 1972 returned: sixth-place finisher Markku Kukkoaho of Finland and seventh-place Karl Honz of West Germany. Alberto Juantorena was the favorite, ranked #1 in the world and trying to become the first man to win the 400 metres/800 metres double (outside of the 1906 Intercalated Games). His main competition was the United States team, aiming for a sixth consecutive win in the event.

Antigua and Barbuda, Belize, the Netherlands Antilles, and Papua New Guinea appeared in this event for the first time. The United States made its eighteenth appearance in the event, the only nation to compete in it at every Olympic Games to that point.

== Competition format ==
The competition retained the basic four-round format from 1920. The "fastest loser" system, introduced in 1964, was applied in the first round. With 20 fewer runners than in 1972 (44 compared to 64), there were only 6 first-round heats, each scheduled to have 7 or 8 athletes but one with only 6 starters. The top five runners in each heat advanced to the quarterfinals along with the next two fastest overall. The 4 quarterfinals each had 8 runners; the top four athletes in each quarterfinal heat advanced to the semifinals, with no "fastest loser" spots. The semifinals featured 2 heats of 8 runners each. The top four runners in each semifinal heat advanced, making an eight-man final.

== Records ==
These were the standing world and Olympic records (in seconds) prior to the 1976 Summer Olympics.

World record	Lee Evans (USA)	43.86	Mexico City, Mexico	18 October 1968
Olympic record	Lee Evans (USA)	43.86	Mexico City, Mexico	18 October 1968

No world or Olympic records were set during this event.

== Schedule ==
The quarterfinals were moved back up to the first day (along with the first round) for the first time since 1964.

All times are Eastern Daylight Time (UTC-4)

Date	Time	Round
Monday, 26 July 1976	11:00; 15:15	Round 1 Quarterfinals
Wednesday, 28 July 1976	15:20	Semifinals
Thursday, 29 July 1976	16:00	Final

== Results ==
=== Heats ===
The heats were held on July 26, 1976.

==== Heat 1 ====
Rank	Lane	Athlete	Nation	Time	Notes
1	2	Herman Frazier	United States	46.09	Q
2	7	Mike Sands	Bahamas	46.52	Q
3	5	Zbigniew Jaremski	Poland	46.68	Q
4	6	Peter Grant	Australia	47.03	Q
5	8	Brian Saunders	Canada	47.24	Q
6	3	Carlos Noroña	Cuba	48.46	
7	1	Hamil Grimes	Barbados	49.24	
8	4	Wilfrid Cyriaque	Haiti	51.49	

==== Heat 2 ====
Rank	Lane	Athlete	Nation	Time	Notes
1	5	Fred Newhouse	United States	45.42	Q
2	7	Rick Mitchell	Australia	46.11	Q
3	6	Jan Werner	Poland	46.19	Q
4	4	Alfonso Di Guida	Italy	46.52	Q
5	2	Leighton Priestley	Jamaica	46.74	Q
6	8	Don Domansky	Canada	47.24	q
7	1	Errol Thurton	Belize	48.91	
8	3	Ahmed Al-Assiri	Saudi Arabia	49.72	

==== Heat 3 ====
Rank	Lane	Athlete	Nation	Time	Notes
1	7	Maxie Parks	United States	46.12	Q
2	2	Delmo da Silva	Brazil	47.21	Q
3	4	Iván Mangual	Puerto Rico	47.39	Q
4	1	Karl Honz	West Germany	47.47	Q
5	5	Eddy Gutiérrez	Cuba	47.89	Q
6	3	Renelda Swan	Bermuda	49.13	
—	—	Stavros Tziortzis	Greece	DNS	
—	—	Tony Moore	Fiji	DNS	

==== Heat 4 ====
Rank	Lane	Athlete	Nation	Time	Notes
1	8	Fons Brijdenbach	Belgium	46.73	Q
2	2	Jerzy Pietrzyk	Poland	46.92	Q
3	6	Franz-Peter Hofmeister	West Germany	47.17	Q
4	1	Ossi Karttunen	Finland	47.22	Q
5	4	Glenn Bogue	Canada	47.42	Q
6	3	Raymond Heerenveen	Netherlands Antilles	47.44	q
7	5	Wavala Kali	Papua New Guinea	48.85	
8	7	Ricardo Larios	Nicaragua	50.52	

==== Heat 5 ====
Rank	Lane	Athlete	Nation	Time	Notes
1	6	David Jenkins	Great Britain	46.60	Q
2	5	Bernd Herrmann	West Germany	46.99	Q
3	4	Jozo Alebić	Yugoslavia	47.03	Q
4	2	Markku Kukkoaho	Finland	47.67	Q
5	3	Charles Joseph	Trinidad and Tobago	47.72	Q
6	7	Samba Dièye	Senegal	47.98	
7	1	Bjarni Stefánsson	Iceland	48.34	

==== Heat 6 ====
Rank	Lane	Athlete	Nation	Time	Notes
1	5	Mike Solomon	Trinidad and Tobago	47.29	Q
2	4	Glen Cohen	Great Britain	47.77	Q
3	6	Alberto Juantorena	Cuba	47.89	Q
4	1	Alfred Daley	Jamaica	48.04	Q
5	7	Fred Sowerby	Antigua and Barbuda	48.12	Q
6	3	Avognan Nogboun	Ivory Coast	48.24	
7	2	José Carvalho	Portugal	48.47	

=== Quarterfinals ===
The quarterfinals were held on July 26, 1976.

==== Quarterfinal 1 ====
Rank	Lane	Athlete	Nation	Time	Notes
1	6	Herman Frazier	United States	46.52	Q
2	3	Fons Brijdenbach	Belgium	46.56	Q
3	1	Karl Honz	West Germany	46.94	Q
4	5	Alfonso Di Guida	Italy	47.07	Q
5	2	Ossi Karttunen	Finland	47.45	
6	4	Peter Grant	Australia	47.69	
7	7	Alfred Daley	Jamaica	48.46	
8	8	Glenn Bogue	Canada	48.98	

==== Quarterfinal 2 ====
Rank	Lane	Athlete	Nation	Time	Notes
1	1	Rick Mitchell	Australia	45.76	Q
2	7	Alberto Juantorena	Cuba	45.92	Q
3	4	Jerzy Pietrzyk	Poland	46.30	Q
4	8	Brian Saunders	Canada	46.42	Q
5	3	Leighton Priestley	Jamaica	46.45	
6	5	Mike Sands	Bahamas	46.48	
7	2	Iván Mangual	Puerto Rico	46.56	
8	6	Charles Joseph	Trinidad and Tobago	46.61	

==== Quarterfinal 3 ====
Rank	Lane	Athlete	Nation	Time	Notes
1	7	Mike Solomon	Trinidad and Tobago	45.83	Q
2	8	Jan Werner	Poland	45.88	Q
3	2	Maxie Parks	United States	45.99	Q
4	3	Bernd Herrmann	West Germany	46.07	Q
5	1	Markku Kukkoaho	Finland	46.24	
6	6	Eddy Gutiérrez	Cuba	46.65	
7	4	Glen Cohen	Great Britain	47.67	
—	—	Don Domansky	Canada	DNS	

==== Quarterfinal 4 ====
Rank	Lane	Athlete	Nation	Time	Notes
1	1	Fred Newhouse	United States	45.97	Q
2	2	David Jenkins	Great Britain	46.18	Q
3	7	Franz-Peter Hofmeister	West Germany	46.20	Q
4	8	Delmo da Silva	Brazil	46.48	Q
5	4	Jozo Alebić	Yugoslavia	46.94	
6	3	Zbigniew Jaremski	Poland	47.10	
7	6	Fred Sowerby	Antigua and Barbuda	48.03	
8	5	Raymond Heerenveen	Netherlands Antilles	48.88	

=== Semifinals ===
The semifinals were held on July 28, 1976.

==== Semifinal 1 ====
Rank	Lane	Athlete	Nation	Time	Notes
1	7	Alberto Juantorena	Cuba	45.10	Q
2	3	Fons Brijdenbach	Belgium	45.28	Q
3	5	Maxie Parks	United States	45.61	Q
4	1	Rick Mitchell	Australia	45.69	Q
5	8	Bernd Herrmann	West Germany	45.94	
6	2	Brian Saunders	Canada	46.46	
7	4	Alfonso Di Guida	Italy	46.50	
8	6	Delmo da Silva	Brazil	46.69	

==== Semifinal 2 ====
Rank	Lane	Athlete	Nation	Time	Notes
1	2	Fred Newhouse	United States	44.89	Q
2	7	David Jenkins	Great Britain	45.20	Q
3	4	Herman Frazier	United States	45.24	Q
4	6	Jan Werner	Poland	45.44	Q
5	3	Jerzy Pietrzyk	Poland	45.65	
6	8	Franz-Peter Hofmeister	West Germany	46.05	
7	1	Mike Solomon	Trinidad and Tobago	46.20	
8	5	Karl Honz	West Germany	46.63	

=== Final ===
The final was held on July 29, 1976.

Rank	Lane	Athlete	Nation	Time
1st place, gold medalist(s)	2	Alberto Juantorena	Cuba	44.26
2nd place, silver medalist(s)	4	Fred Newhouse	United States	44.40
3rd place, bronze medalist(s)	3	Herman Frazier	United States	44.95
4	8	Fons Brijdenbach	Belgium	45.04
5	7	Maxie Parks	United States	45.24
6	6	Rick Mitchell	Australia	45.40
7	5	David Jenkins	Great Britain	45.57
8	1	Jan Werner	Poland	45.63
