= Ahmed Al-Assiri (sprinter) =

Saudi Arabian sprinter

Personal information
- Nationality: Saudi Arabian
- Born: 12 February 1952 (age 74)

Sport
- Sport: Sprinting
- Event: 400 metres

Ahmed Al-Assiri (born 12 February 1952) is a Saudi Arabian sprinter. He competed in the men's 400 metres at the 1976 Summer Olympics.
