= Zbigniew Jaremski =

Polish sprinter

Medal record

Men's athletics

Olympic Games
Silver medal – second place	1976 Montreal	4x400 m

European Championships
Silver medal – second place	1978 Prague	4×400 m

Zbigniew Jaremski (19 June 1949 – 3 January 2011) was a Polish sprinter, who specialized in the 400 m.

== Career ==
Jaremski was born in Zabrze and represented the club Górnik Zabrze. He competed in 400 m at the 1972 and 1976 Summer Olympics, reaching the quarter-finals both times. In the 4 × 400 m relay he finished fifth with the Polish team at the 1972 Olympic Games. He then won the silver medal at the 1976 Olympic Games with his teammates Ryszard Podlas, Jan Werner and Jerzy Pietrzyk.

Jaremski became Polish champion in the 400 m in 1972, 1973 and 1975.
