= Ryszard Podlas =

Polish sprinter

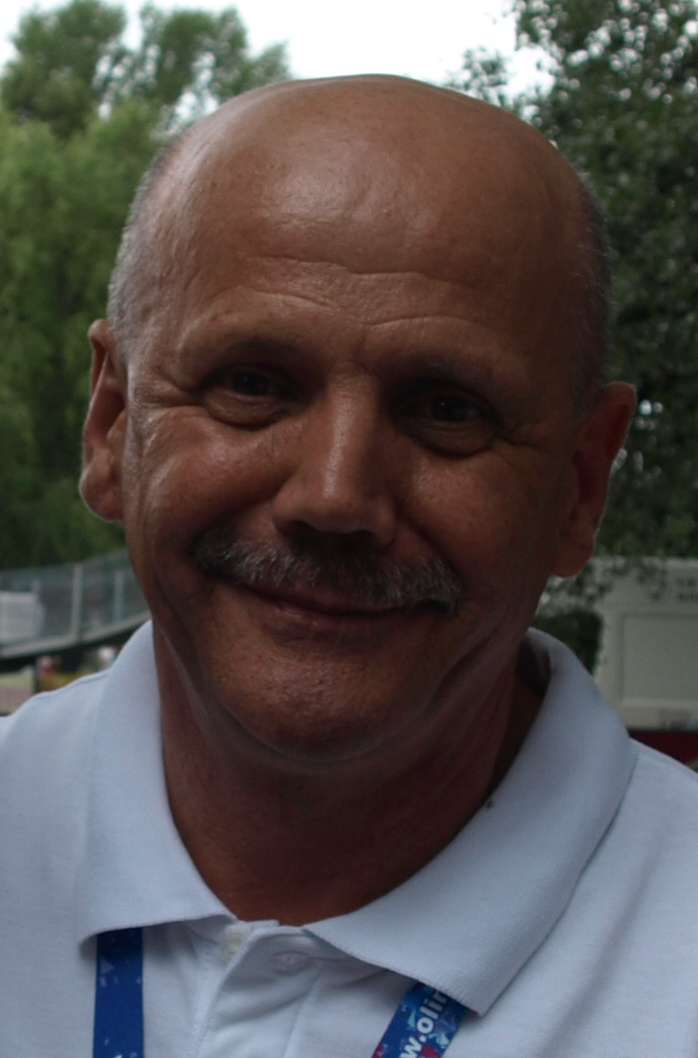

Personal information
- Born: 29 July 1954 (age 71) Białobrzezie, Poland

Sport
- Sport: Track and field
Medal record
Representing Poland
Olympic Games
Silver medal – second place	1976 Montreal	4x400 m
European Championships
Silver medal – second place	1978 Prague	4×400 m
European Indoor Championships
Silver medal – second place	1978 Milan	400 m
Summer Universiade
Silver medal – second place	1977 Sofia	4x400m relay
Bronze medal – third place	1977 Sofia	400m

Ryszard Podlas (born 29 July 1954) is a Polish sprinter who specialized in the 400 metres.

He was born in Białobrzezie and represented the club Technika Pracze. He won the silver medal in the 4 x 400 metre relay at the 1976 Summer Olympics with his teammates Jan Werner, Zbigniew Jaremski and Jerzy Pietrzyk. In 1977 he won the bronze medal in 400 metres at the 1977 Summer Universiade. In 1978 he won the silver medal in the 400 metres at the 1978 European Indoor Championships. At the 1977 IAAF World Cup he won a silver medal in the relay with the European team. He also finished second in the 400 metres, but following a protest, there was a re-race where he only finished fourth. At the 1979 IAAF World Cup he won another silver medal in the relay. He became Polish champion in the 400 metres in 1977, 1978 and 1979.

He also won the silver medal in relay at the 1978 European Championships together with Jerzy Włodarczyk, Zbigniew Jaremski and Cezary Łapiński. In relay at the 1982 European Championships the Polish team finished fifth. The team was also disqualified in the final at the 1983 World Championships.
