= Boško Božinović =

Croatian coach and middle-distance runner (1949–2018)

Personal information
- Nationality: Yugoslav; Croatian
- Born: September 27, 1949 Split, Yugoslavia
- Died: March 5, 2018 (aged 68)

Sport
- Sport: Track
- Event(s): 1500 meters, mile

Achievements and titles
- Personal best(s): 1500m: 3:39.3; Mile: 3:59.51
Medal record
Men's athletics
Representing Yugoslavia
Mediterranean Games
Gold medal – first place	1975 Algiers	Men's 1500 meters
- Updated on February 25, 2018

Boško "Klifton" Božinović (born September 27, 1949 − March 5, 2018) was a Croatian conditioning coach and a retired middle-distance runner who represented Yugoslavia at the 1975 Mediterranean Games.

== Running career ==
Božinović became the first person from Yugoslavia to have run under 3:40 over 1500 meters when he ran 3:39.3 on June 20, 1975 at an international track meet in Warsaw. Later that summer he won the men's 1500 meters at the 1975 Mediterranean Games.

== Conditioning coach career ==
In his years following athletics, Božinović pursued a career in conditioning professional football players. Ivan Katalinić, one of Hajduk Split's coaches in the early 2000s, appointed Božinović as a conditioning trainer in 2002 after the pair had worked together in NK Varteks. After doing conditioning work with FC Metalurh Zaporizhya, Božinović made a return to Hajduk Split in the summer of 2009. However, on August 6, 2009, Hajduk's coach Ivica Kalinić suffered a heart attack in Hajduk's match against MŠK Žilina in the 2009-10 UEFA Europa League qualifiers, and although he survived he had to retire. The loss to Žilina and Kalinić's near death experience destabilized the club. Even though Božinović was appointed by Kalinić in the first place, Hajduk tried to offer Božinović money to terminate his contract due to Kalinić's legally binding contract (in spite of his untimely retirement) allegedly causing Hajduk financial problems. Božinović rejected the offer, favoring that his contract be honored to the end. He stayed at Hajduk for several years before moving to NK Solin in 2013, only to return to Hajduk in 2014.
