= Palaikythro =

Palaikythro: Παλαίκυθρο (Greek); Balıkesir (Turkish)
- Village
- Location in Cyprus
- Coordinates: 35°12′24″N 33°29′36″E
- Country (de jure): Cyprus
  - District: Nicosia District
- Country (de facto): Northern Cyprus
  - District: Lefkoşa District
- Time zone: UTC+2 (EET)
  - Summer (DST): UTC+3 (EEST)

Palaikythro (Greek: Παλαίκυθρο; Turkish: Balıkesir) is a village in the Nicosia District of Cyprus, located 6 km south of Kythrea, on the main Nicosia-Famagusta highway. The village is under de facto control of Northern Cyprus.
