= Saïd Aouita =

Moroccan track and field athlete (born 1959)

Said Aouita سعيد عويطة
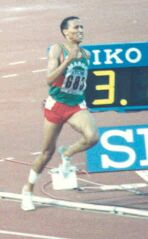
- Aouita at the 1987 World Championships

Personal information
- Nationality: Moroccan American
- Born: 2 November 1959 (age 66) Kenitra, Morocco
- Height: 1.76 m (5 ft 9 in)
- Weight: 65 kg (143 lb)

Sport
- Sport: Track and field
- Events: 1500 meters, 3000 meters, 5000 meters

Achievements and titles
- Personal bests: 800 m: 1:43.86 (Cologne 1988); 1500 m: 3:29.46 (Berlin 1985); Mile: 3:46.76 (Helsinki 1987); 3000 m: 7:29.45 (Cologne 1989); 2-mile: 8:03.45 (Turin 1987); 5000 m: 12:58.39 (Rome 1987); 10,000 m: 27:11.26 (Oslo 1986); 3,000 m steeplechase: 8:21.92 (Latakia 1987)
Medal record
Men's athletics
Representing Morocco
Olympic Games
Gold medal – first place	1984 Los Angeles	5000 m
Bronze medal – third place	1988 Seoul	800 m
World Championships
Gold medal – first place	1987 Rome	5000 m
Bronze medal – third place	1983 Helsinki	1500 m
World Indoor Championships
Gold medal – first place	1989 Budapest	3000 m
African Championships
Gold medal – first place	1984 Rabat	1500 m
Silver medal – second place	1982 Cairo	1500 m
Bronze medal – third place	1982 Cairo	800 m
Mediterranean Games
Gold medal – first place	1983 Casablanca	800 m
Gold medal – first place	1983 Casablanca	1500 m
Gold medal – first place	1987 Latakia	1500 m
Gold medal – first place	1987 Latakia	5000 m
Silver medal – second place	1987 Latakia	3000 m steeple

Saïd Aouita (Arabic: سعيد عويطة; born November 2, 1959) is a former Moroccan track and field athlete. He is the only athlete in history to have won a medal in each of the 800 meters and 5000 meters at the Olympic Games. He won the 5000 meters at the 1984 Summer Olympics and the 1987 World Championships in Athletics, as well as the 3000 meters at the 1989 IAAF World Indoor Championships. He is a former world record holder over 1500 metres (3:29.46), 2000 m (4:50.81), 3000 m (7:29.45), and twice at 5000 m (13:00.40 and 12:58.39).

== Early life and education ==
Saïd Aouita was born on November 2, 1959, in Kenitra, a coastal Moroccan city. Nine years later, he moved along with his family to Fes due to the nature of his father's work. As a child he spent most of his time playing football and wanted to be a great footballer; however, his outstanding skills in running made his coaches foresee a great future in track and field.

Aouita has a Bachelor of Science degree in Management and master's degree in Business Administration. He is pursuing a doctorate in Sport Management and Leadership.

== Running career ==
Aouita had his first start towards stardom at the 1983 World Championships in Athletics held in Helsinki. He contested the 1500 m and finished third in the final, taking the bronze medal, after the pace slowed in the last 1000 meters and then finished with a sprint.

In 1984, Aouita decided to run the 5000 m at the 1984 Summer Olympics. Antonio Leitão from Portugal ran in first for the majority of the race. Aouita stayed behind Leitão and then sprinted past him on the last lap to win.

In 1985, Aouita ran two world records: first in 5000 m (13:00.40) in Oslo on 27 July, then in 1500 m (3:29.46) on 23 August.

In 1986 he missed setting the world record in the 3000 m by 0.44 of a second.

In 1987, Aouita's main objective was to excel in the world championship held in Rome and break records. First, he broke the 2000 m world record with a time of 4:50.81 in Paris and only six days later, he surprised the world by breaking his own world record for 5000 m, becoming the first man to go under 13 minutes, with a time of 12:58.39. For the 1987 World Championships in Athletics, Aouita decided just to contest the 5000 m. In the 5000 m final, John Ngugi from Kenya set a fair pace, but by no means fast. Aouita, always in control of the race, made his move just before the bell, leading a mass sprint for the finish that he won in 13:26.44.

In 1988, at the 1988 Summer Olympics, he attempted to race in the 800 m and 1500 m but had a hamstring injury which made him finish third in 800 m and withdraw from the 1500 m although he had qualified for the semi-final. In spite of that his bronze medal made him the only athlete in history to combine medals at both 800 m and 5000 m.

In 1989, Aouita won the 3000 m at the 1989 IAAF World Indoor Championships in Budapest. Later that year, he broke the world record for the same distance in Köln, Germany with the time of 7:29.45 and thus, he was the first man in history to go under 7:30:00.

Aouita was a versatile middle and long-distance runner, excelling at distances between 800 m and 10,000 m during the eighties. He raced and won against the Olympic champions Joaquim Cruz (800 m), Peter Rono (1500 m), John Ngugi (5000 m) and Alberto Cova (10000 m) over their respective main distances. Between September 1983 and September 1990 he won 115 of his 119 races. The defeats were against world champion Steve Cram over 1500 m, Olympic bronze medalist Alessandro Lambruschini over 3000 m steeplechase, Olympic champions Joaquim Cruz and Paul Ereng over 800 m and world champion Yobes Ondieki over 5000 m.

In the early nineties, Aouita underwent surgery on his leg, after which his doctors advised him to put an end to his career as an athlete for his health. After a set of failures in a number of races he decided to retire from athletics.

== Personal life ==
Said Aouita married Khadija Skhir in 1983, one year before the 1984 Olympic Games. Together they have four children: one son, Adil, and three daughters; Soukaina, Sarah, and Zeena.

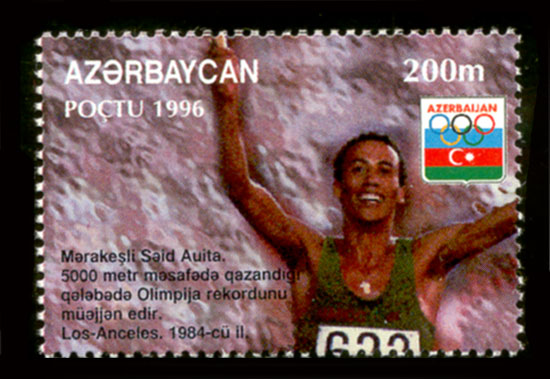
Aouita on Azerbaijani postage stamp

After his athletics career ended, Aouita worked with mixed success as a consultant for numerous sport institutions, as Technical National Manager in Morocco, and National Distance Coach in Australia thanks not only to his fruitful field experience, but also to his academic competences. Now, Aouita is working as a Senior Analyst for Al Jazeera Sports channel. Aouita also has a sports clothing company which was established in 2009.

Aouita is featured on an Azerbaijani postage stamp.

He lives in Orlando, Florida.

== International competitions ==
Year	Competition	Venue	Position	Event	Notes
1980	Islamic Games	İzmir, Turkey	1st	800 m	
1980	Islamic Games	İzmir, Turkey	1st	1500 m	
1981	World Student Games	Bucharest, Romania	1st	1500 m	GR
1982	African Championships	Cairo, Egypt	3rd	800 m	
1982	African Championships	Cairo, Egypt	2nd	1500 m	
1983	Mediterranean Games	Casablanca, Morocco	1st	800 m	
1983	Mediterranean Games	Casablanca, Morocco	1st	1500 m	
1983	World Championships	Helsinki, Finland	3rd	1500 m	
1984	Olympic Games	Los Angeles, United States	1st	5000 m	OR
1984	African Championships	Rabat, Morocco	1st	1500 m	
1985	Pan Arab Games	Casablanca, Morocco	1st	1500 m	
1987	Mediterranean Games	Latakia, Syria	1st	1500 m	
1987	Mediterranean Games	Latakia, Syria	1st	5000 m	
1987	Mediterranean Games	Latakia, Syria	2nd	3000 m steeplechase	
1987	World Championships	Rome, Italy	1st	5000 m	
1988	Olympic Games	Seoul, South Korea	3rd	800 m	
1989	World Indoor Championships	Budapest, Hungary	1st	3000 m	
1989	Jeux de la Francophonie	Casablanca, Morocco	1st	5000 m	
1989	IAAF World Cup	Barcelona, Spain	1st	5000 m	
1991	World Championships	Tokyo, Japan	11th	1500 m	

=== World records ===
- 1500 metres – 3:29.46, Berlin, 23 August 1985
- 2000 metres – 4:50.81, Paris, 16 July 1987
- 3000 metres – 7:29.45, Cologne, 20 August 1989
- Two miles –– 8:13.45, Turin, 28 May 1987
- 5000 metres – 13:00.40, Oslo, 22 July 1985
- 5000 metres – 12:58.39, Rome, 27 July 1987

=== Awards and distinctions ===
- Three times IAAF Grand Prix Final winner (800 m, 1500 m, and 5000 m)

Records
Preceded by Steve Cram	Men's 1,500 m World Record Holder; 23 August 1985 – 6 September 1992	Succeeded by Noureddine Morceli
Preceded by Steve Cram	Men's 2000 m World Record Holder; 16 July 1987 – 03 July 1995	Succeeded by Noureddine Morceli
Preceded by Henry Rono	Men's 3000 m World Record Holder; 20 August 1989 – 16 August 1992	Succeeded by Moses Kiptanui
Preceded by David Moorcroft	Men's 5000 m World Record Holder; 22 July 1985 – 4 June 1994	Succeeded by Haile Gebrselassie
Awards
Preceded by Carl Lewis	Men's Track & Field Athlete of the Year; 1985	Succeeded by Yuriy Syedikh
Sporting positions
Preceded by Fernando Mamede	Men's 5000 m Best Year Performance; 1984 – 1987	Succeeded by John Ngugi
Preceded by Sebastian Coe	Men's 1500 m Best Year Performance; 1987	Succeeded by Steve Cram
Preceded by Doug Padilla; Sydney Maree	Men's 3000 m Best Year Performance; 1984 – 1986; 1989	Succeeded by Dieter Baumann; Khalid Skah
