= Antonio Baños (athlete) =

Spanish long-distance runner

Personal information
- Full name: Antonio Baños Alonso
- Nationality: Spanish
- Born: 7 December 1945 (age 80)

Sport
- Sport: Long-distance running
- Event: Marathon

Antonio Baños Alonso (born 7 December 1945) is a Spanish long-distance runner. He competed in the marathon at the 1976 Summer Olympics.
