= Kyriakos Onisiforou =

Greek sprinter

Personal information
- Born: 10 April 1951 (age 75) Nicosia, Cyprus

Sport
- Sport: Track and field
Medal record
Representing Greece
Mediterranean Games
Gold medal – first place	1971 Izmir	400m
Gold medal – first place	1975 Algiers	400m

Kyriakos Onisiforou (Greek: Κυριάκος Ονησιφόρου; born 10 April 1951) is a Greek former 400m sprinter who competed in the 1972 Summer Olympics.
