= Roqui Sanchez =

French middle-distance runner (born 1952)

Personal information
- Nationality: French
- Born: 17 December 1952 (age 72)

Sport
- Sport: Middle-distance running
- Event: 800 metres

Roqui Sanchez (born 17 December 1952) is a French middle-distance runner. He competed in the 800 metres at the 1972 Summer Olympics and the 1976 Summer Olympics.
