= Tim Dale =

American sprinter

Personal information
- Born: August 19, 1957 (age 69) Pleasantville, New Jersey, United States

Sport
- Sport: Track and field
Medal record
Representing United States
Summer Universiade
Gold medal – first place	1977 Sofia	4x400m relay

Tim Dale (born August 19, 1957) is an American former sprinter.

A graduate of Pleasantville High School, Dale was a regular member of the Villanova Wildcats track and field relay team, and he anchored them to win the 1978 NCAA Division I outdoor 4 × 400 m championship.
