= Białobrzezie =

- Village
- Location within Poland
- Coordinates: 50°47′58″N 16°54′7″E
- Country: Poland
- Voivodeship: Lower Silesian
- County: Strzelin
- Gmina: Kondratowice
- Population (2017): 193
- Time zone: UTC+1 (CET)
  - Summer (DST): UTC+2 (CEST)
- Area code: +48 71
- Vehicle registration: DST

Białobrzezie [bjawɔˈbʐɛʑɛ] (German: Rothschloss) is a village in the administrative district of Gmina Kondratowice, within Strzelin County, Lower Silesian Voivodeship, in south-western Poland.

In Białobrzezie there is a historic manor house of the Piast dynasty and a park dating back to the 16th century.
