= Wilfrid Cyriaque =

Haitian sprinter

Personal information
- Nationality: Haitian
- Born: 10 May 1951 (age 75)

Sport
- Sport: Sprinting
- Event: 400 metres

Wilfrid Cyriaque (born 10 May 1951) is a Haitian sprinter. He competed in the men's 400 metres at the 1976 Summer Olympics.
