= Josef Lomický =

Czech sprinter

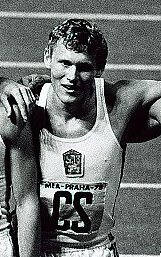
- Lomický in 1978

Personal information
- Nationality: Czech
- Born: 19 February 1958 (age 68) České Budějovice, Czechoslovakia

Sport
- Sport: Sprinting
- Event: 4 × 400 metres relay
Medal record
Men's athletics
Representing Czechoslovakia
European Championships
Bronze medal – third place	1978 Prague	4×400 m

Josef Lomický (born 19 February 1958) is a Czech retired sprinter. He competed in the men's 4 × 400 metres relay at the 1980 Summer Olympics.

== International competitions ==
Year	Competition	Venue	Position	Event	Notes
1978	European Championships	Prague, Czechoslovakia	3rd	4 × 400 m relay	
