= Waldemar Gondek =

Polish middle-distance runner

Personal information
- Born: 3 October 1953 (age 72) Szczecin, Poland

Sport
- Sport: Track and field
Medal record
Representing Poland
Summer Universiade
| Gold medal – first place | 1975 Rome | 800m |
| Gold medal – first place | 1975 Rome | 4x400m relay |

Waldemar Gondek (born 3 October 1953) is a retired Polish runner who specialized in the 800 metres.

He won the 800 metres at the 1975 Summer Universiade. He also competed at the 1975 European Indoor Championships, but without reaching the final. He became Polish champion in the 800 metres in 1975.
