= Andreu Ballbé =

Spanish athlete

Personal information
- Full name: Andreu Ballbé García
- Born: 31 October 1952 (age 73) Barcelona, Spain
- Occupation(s): Olympic athlete, record holder of the 800 meters
- Height: 181 cm (5 ft 11 in)
- Weight: 65 kg (143 lb)

Andreu Ballbé García (Spanish: Andrés Ballbé García, born 31 October 1952 in Barcelona) is a former middle-distance runner from Spain. He represented his native country at the 1976 Summer Olympics in Montreal, Quebec, Canada. There, he was eliminated in the heats of the 800 metres, clocking 1:48.38. Best time in 800 meters is 1:46:59. It was a Catalan record for 26 years.
