= Hector Llatser =

French sprinter (born 1957)

Personal information
- Born: 10 November 1957 (age 68) Toulouse, France

Sport
- Sport: Track and field
Medal record
Representing France
Mediterranean Games
Gold medal – first place	1983 Casablanca	4x400m relay
Silver medal – second place	1983 Casablanca	400m
Summer Universiade
Bronze medal – third place	1983 Edmonton	4x400m relay

Hector Llatser (born 10 November 1957) is a French former sprinter who competed in the 1976 Summer Olympics and in the 1984 Summer Olympics.
