= Milorad Čikić =

Serbian sprinter (born 1950)

Personal information
- Born: 1 August 1950 (age 75) Valjevo, Yugoslavia

Sport
- Sport: Track and field
Medal record
Representing Yugoslavia
Mediterranean Games
Gold medal – first place	1975 Algiers	4x400m relay
Bronze medal – third place	1975 Algiers	400m
Summer Universiade
Silver medal – second place	1975 Rome	4x400m relay

Milorad Čikić (born 1 August 1950) is a Serbian former sprinter who competed in the 1972 Summer Olympics.
