= Jerzy Pietrzyk =

Polish sprinter

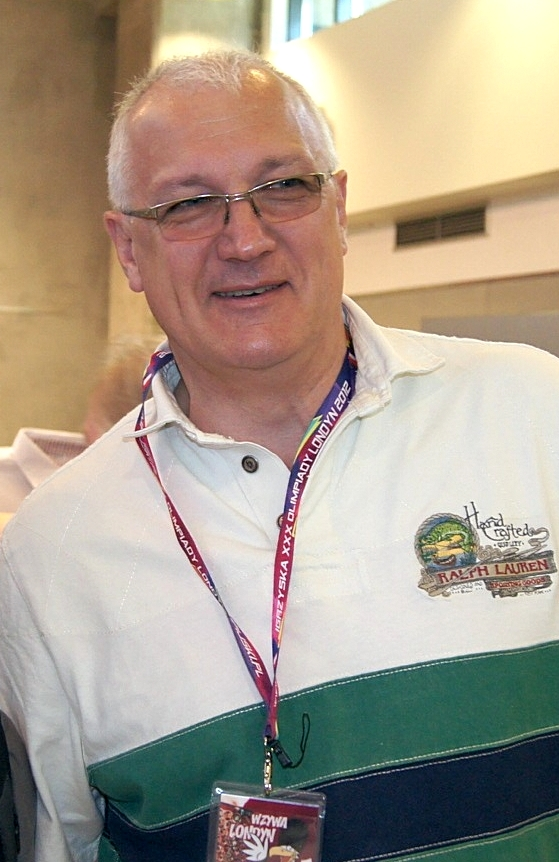

Personal information
- Born: 17 April 1955 (age 71) Warsaw, Poland

Sport
- Sport: Track and field
Medal record
Representing Poland
Summer Olympics
Silver medal – second place	1976 Montreal	4 x 400 m relay
Summer Universiade
Gold medal – first place	1975 Rome	400m
Gold medal – first place	1975 Rome	4x400m relay
Silver medal – second place	1977 Sofia	4x400m relay

Jerzy Pietrzyk (born 17 April 1955) is a retired Polish sprinter who specialized in the 400 metres.

He was born in Warsaw and represented the clubs Górnik Zabrze and Gwardia Warszawa. He became European junior champion in 1973. In 1975 he won the gold medal in 400 metres at the 1975 Summer Universiade.

He competed in 400 metres at the 1976 and 1980 Summer Olympics, reaching the quarter-finals in 1976 and round one in 1980. In the 4 x 400 metres relay he won the silver medal at the 1976 Olympic Games with his teammates Ryszard Podlas, Jan Werner and Zbigniew Jaremski. He also competed in this event at the 1980 Olympic Games.
