= Milovan Savić =

Croatian former middle distance runner (born 1953)

Personal information
- Nationality: Yugoslavian/Croatian
- Born: 16 June 1953 (age 73) Novi Sad, Yugoslavia
- Height: 192 cm (6 ft 4 in)
- Weight: 72 kg (159 lb)

Sport
- Sport: Athletics
- Event: middle-distance
- Club: AK Istra, Pula
Medal record
Men's athletics
Representing Yugoslavia
European Indoor Championships
Bronze medal – third place	1976 Munich	800m
Mediterranean Games
Gold medal – first place	1975 Algiers	800m
Gold medal – first place	1975 Algiers	4x400m relay
Summer Universiade
Silver medal – second place	1975 Rome	4x400m relay
Silver medal – second place	1977 Sofia	800m

Milovan Savić (born 16 June 1953) is a Croatian former middle distance runner who competed for SFR Yugoslavia in the 1976 Summer Olympics and in the 1980 Summer Olympics.

Savić won the British AAA Championships title in the 800 metres event at the 1977 AAA Championships, a race in which he beat Sebastian Coe and John Walker.
