= Amar Brahmia =

Algerian middle-distance runner

Personal information
- Nationality: Algerian
- Born: 2 September 1954 (age 71) Djebel Nador, Guelma, Algeria

Sport
- Sport: Athletics
- Event: middle-distance
Medal record
Representing Algeria
Summer Universiade
Bronze medal – third place	1981 Bucharest	1500m
All-Africa Games
Silver medal – second place	1978 Algiers	800m
Bronze medal – third place	1978 Algiers	1500m

Amar Brahmia (born 2 September 1954) is a retired Algerian middle-distance runner who specialized in the 1500 metres, who is now the national long-distance track coach of Algeria. He is the brother of Nacer and Baki Brahmia, both of whom also competed internationally.

At the 1978 All-Africa Games he won a bronze medal in the 1500 metres and the silver medal in the 800 metres. He later won a bronze medal at the 1981 Summer Universiade. He became Algerian national champion in 1976 and 1978, and won a silver medal at the 1978 AAA Championships behind David Moorcroft. He also competed at the 1983 World Championships without reaching the final.

His personal best time in the 1500 metres was 3.36.5 minutes, achieved in September 1981 in Rieti. He also had 2.17.5 minutes in the 1000 metres, achieved in August 1978 in Nice; and 3.57.20 minutes in the mile run, achieved in September 1981 in Rieti.
