= Alfonso Di Guida =

Italian sprinter

Personal information
- Nationality: Italian
- Born: 1 May 1954 (age 72) Naples, Italy
- Height: 1.81 m (5 ft 11 1/2 in)
- Weight: 74 kg (163 lb)

Sport
- Country: Italy
- Sport: Athletics
- Event: 400 metres
- Club: G.S. Fiamme Gialle

Achievements and titles
- Personal best: 400 m: 46.39 (1981)
Medal record
Universiade
| Bronze medal – third place | 1979 Mexico City | 4 × 400 m relay |
Mediterranean Games
| Bronze medal – third place | 1975 Algiers | 4 × 400 m relay |
| Bronze medal – third place | 1979 Split | 4 × 400 m relay |
European Cup
| Gold medal – first place | 1981 Zagreb | 4 × 400 m relay |

Alfonso Di Guida (born 1 May 1954 in Naples) is an Italian former sprinter (400 m). He was italian record holder with the 4 × 400 metres relay national team.

== Biography ==
In his career he won 4 times the national championships.

== National records ==
- 4 × 400 metres relay: 3:01.42 ( (Socialist Federal Republic of Yugoslavia) Zagreb, 16 August 1981) - with Stefano Malinverni, Roberto Ribaud, Mauro Zuliani

== Achievements ==
| Year | Competition | Venue | Position | Event | Performance | Notes |
|---|---|---|---|---|---|---|
| 1976 | Olympic Games | (Canada) Montreal | Semi-Finals | 400 metres | 46.50 | |

== National titles ==
- 3 wins in 400 metres at the Italian Athletics Championships (1974, 1976, 1977)
- 1 win in 400 metres at the Italian Athletics Indoor Championships (1976)
