= Athletics at the 1972 Summer Olympics – Men's 4 × 400 metres relay =

Men's 4 × 400 metres relay at the Games of the XX Olympiad
- Venue: Olympic Stadium
- Dates: 9 September & 10 September 1972
- Competitors: from 21 nations

Medalists
1st place, gold medalist(s)		Charles Asati; Munyoro Nyamau; Robert Ouko; Julius Sang	Kenya
2nd place, silver medalist(s)		Martin Reynolds; Alan Pascoe; Dave Hemery; David Jenkins	Great Britain
3rd place, bronze medalist(s)		Gilles Bertould; Daniel Velasques; Francis Kerbiriou; Jacques Carette	France

The men's 4 × 400 metres relay was the longer of the two men's relays on the Athletics at the 1972 Summer Olympics program in Munich. It was held on 9 September and 10 September 1972.

The United States were heavily favoured in this event. After the 400 metres final, the IOC banned gold and silver medalists Vince Matthews and Wayne Collett from the Olympics for life after they staged a protest on the podium, talking to each other and failing to stand at attention during the medal ceremony, while the third American in the event, John Smith, had pulled a hamstring as he was leading 80 metres into the final and had been ruled unfit to run.

This left the Americans unable to field a team, and they were forced to scratch, leaving no clear favourite.

== Results ==
Top two in each heat (blue) and the next two fastest (green) advanced to the finals.

=== Heats ===
==== Heat one ====
Rank	Names	Nationality	Time
1	Martin Reynolds, Alan Pascoe, Dave Hemery, David Jenkins	Great Britain	3:01.26
2	Charles Asati, Munyoro Nyamau, Robert Ouko, Julius Sang	Kenya	3:01.27
3	Erik Carlgren, Anders Faager, Kenth Öhman, Ulf Rönner	Sweden	3:03.05
4	Ian Gordon, Brian MacLaren, Craig Blackman, Tony Powell	Canada	3:04.22
5	Miro Kocuvan, Laszlo Ubori, Jozo Alebić, Milorad Čikić	Yugoslavia	3:05.70
6	Omar Ghizlat, Omar Chokhmane, Salah Fettouh, Mohamed Bouboud	Morocco	3:05.92
7	Fernando Silva, Alberto Matos, José Carvalho, Fernando Mamede	Portugal	3:10.00
–	Maurice Peoples, Tommy Turner, Lee Evans, John Smith	United States	DNS

==== Heat two ====
Rank	Names	Nationality	Time
1	Bernd Herrmann, Horst-Rüdiger Schlöske, Hermann Köhler, Karl Honz	West Germany	3:03.27
2	Arthur Cooper, Pat Marshall, Charles Joseph, Trevor James	Trinidad and Tobago	3:03.48
3	Musa Dogon Yaro, Bruce Ijirighwo, Mamman Makama, Robert Ojo	Nigeria	3:04.31
4	Tegegne Bezabeh, Shoangizaw Worku, Ketema Benti, Mulugetta Tadesse	Ethiopia	3:08.59
5	Daniele Giovanardi, Giacomo Puosi, Lorenzo Cellerino, Sergio Bello	Italy	3:09.7
6	Hamad Ndee, Obedi Mwanga, Omari Abdallah, Claver Kamanya	Tanzania	3:10.1
7	Omar Ba, Abou Mamadou Sow, Samba Dièye, Jean-Pierre Mango	Senegal	3:11.2
8	Mohamed Musa Gadou, Dafallah Sultan Farah, Ibrahim Saad Abdel Galil, Angelo Hussein	Sudan	3:14.5

==== Heat three ====
Rank	Names	Nationality	Time
1	Jan Werner, Jan Balachowski, Zbigniew Jaremski, Andrzej Badeński	Poland	3:02.52
2	Stig Lönnqvist, Ari Salin, Ossi Karttunen, Markku Kukkoaho	Finland	3:02.97
3	Gilles Bertould, Daniel Velasques, Francis Kerbiriou, Jacques Carette	France	3:03.13
4	Leighton Priestley, Kim Rowe, Trevor Campbell, Alfred Daley	Jamaica	3:03.83
5	Raúl Dome, Félix Pérez, José Jacinto Hidalgo, Eric Phillips	Venezuela	3:06.99
6	Tambusamy Krishnan, Sinnayah Sabapathy, Mohamed Hassan bin Osman, Baba Singhe Peyadesa	Malaysia	3:13.51
–	Mohamad Younas, Norman Brinkworth, M. Seediq, Iqbal Nusrat	Pakistan	DNS

=== Final ===
Rank	Names	Nationality	Time
1st place, gold medalist(s)	Charles Asati, Munyoro Nyamau, Robert Ouko, Julius Sang	Kenya	2:59.83
2nd place, silver medalist(s)	Martin Reynolds, Alan Pascoe, Dave Hemery, David Jenkins	Great Britain	3:00.46
3rd place, bronze medalist(s)	Gilles Bertould, Daniel Velasques, Francis Kerbiriou, Jacques Carette	France	3:00.65
4	Bernd Herrmann, Horst-Rüdiger Schlöske, Hermann Köhler, Karl Honz	West Germany	3:00.88
5	Jan Werner, Jan Balachowski, Zbigniew Jaremski, Andrzej Badeński	Poland	3:01.05
6	Stig Lönnqvist, Ari Salin, Ossi Karttunen, Markku Kukkoaho	Finland	3:01.12
7	Erik Carlgren, Anders Faager, Kenth Öhman, Ulf Rönner	Sweden	3:02.57
8	Arthur Cooper, Pat Marshall, Charles Joseph, Edwin Roberts	Trinidad and Tobago	3:03.58
