= 1971 European Athletics Championships – Men's 400 metres =

Men's 400 metres at the European Athletics Championships

The men's 400 metres at the 1971 European Athletics Championships was held in Helsinki, Finland, at Helsinki Olympic Stadium on 11, 12, and 13 August 1971.

== Medalists ==
Gold	David Jenkins; Great Britain
Silver	Marcello Fiasconaro; Italy
Bronze	Jan Werner; Poland

== Results ==
=== Final ===
13 August

Rank	Name	Nationality	Time	Notes
1st place, gold medalist(s)	David Jenkins	Great Britain	45.45	CR NR
2nd place, silver medalist(s)	Marcello Fiasconaro	Italy	45.49	CR NR
3rd place, bronze medalist(s)	Jan Werner	Poland	45.57	
4	Markku Kukkoaho	Finland	45.74	NR
5	Thomas Jordan	West Germany	46.01	
6	Hermann Köhler	West Germany	46.07	
7	Aleksandr Bratchikov	Soviet Union	46.40	
8	Klaus Hauke	East Germany	46.88	

=== Semi-finals ===
12 August

==== Semi-final 1 ====
Rank	Name	Nationality	Time	Notes
1	Thomas Jordan	West Germany	46.29	Q
2	Hermann Köhler	West Germany	46.44	Q
3	Marcello Fiasconaro	Italy	46.44	Q
4	Aleksandr Bratchikov	Soviet Union	46.66	Q
5	Andrzej Badeński	Poland	46.80	
6	Per Rom	Norway	46.92	
7	Miroslav Tulis	Czechoslovakia	47.05	
8	Michael Fredriksson	Sweden	48.4	

==== Semi-final 2 ====
Rank	Name	Nationality	Time	Notes
1	Jan Werner	Poland	46.11	Q
2	David Jenkins	Great Britain	46.22	Q
3	Markku Kukkoaho	Finland	46.25	Q
4	Klaus Hauke	East Germany	46.38	Q
5	Martin Jellinghaus	West Germany	46.78	
6	Gilles Bertould	France	47.23	
7	Fanahan McSweeney	Ireland	47.69	
	Waldemar Korycki	Poland	DNS	

=== Heats ===
11 August

==== Heat 1 ====
Rank	Name	Nationality	Time	Notes
1	Jan Werner	Poland	46.44	Q
2	Marcello Fiasconaro	Italy	46.49	Q
3	Gilles Bertould	France	46.81	Q
4	Miroslav Tulis	Czechoslovakia	46.83	Q
5	Semyon Kocher	Soviet Union	46.90	

==== Heat 2 ====
Rank	Name	Nationality	Time	Notes
1	David Jenkins	Great Britain	46.66	Q
2	Andrzej Badeński	Poland	46.68	Q
3	Per Rom	Norway	46.73	Q
4	Hermann Köhler	West Germany	46.77	Q
5	Yevgeniy Borisenko	Soviet Union	47.12	
6	Christian Nicolau	France	47.12	
6	Miro Kocuvan	Yugoslavia	47.63	
7	Anders Faager	Sweden	47.32	

==== Heat 3 ====
Rank	Name	Nationality	Time	Notes
1	Klaus Hauke	East Germany	46.84	Q
2	Martin Jellinghaus	West Germany	46.96	Q
3	Waldemar Korycki	Poland	47.10	Q
4	Michael Fredriksson	Sweden	47.44	Q
5	Giacomo Puosi	Italy	47.63	
6	Hugues Roger	France	47.75	
7	John Robertson	Great Britain	48.20	

==== Heat 4 ====
Rank	Name	Nationality	Time	Notes
1	Markku Kukkoaho	Finland	46.72	Q
2	Thomas Jordan	West Germany	46.98	Q
3	Aleksandr Bratchikov	Soviet Union	47.21	Q
4	Fanahan McSweeney	Ireland	47.34	Q
5	René Bervoets	Belgium	47.42	
6	Martin Bilham	Great Britain	48.13	

== Participation ==
According to an unofficial count, 26 athletes from 14 countries participated in the event.

- Belgium (1)
- Czechoslovakia (1)
- East Germany (1)
- Finland (1)
- France (3)
- Ireland (1)
- Italy (2)
- Norway (1)
- Poland (3)
- Soviet Union (3)
- Sweden (2)
- Great Britain (3)
- West Germany (3)
- Yugoslavia (1)
