= The Power Plant =

The Power Plant Contemporary Art Gallery
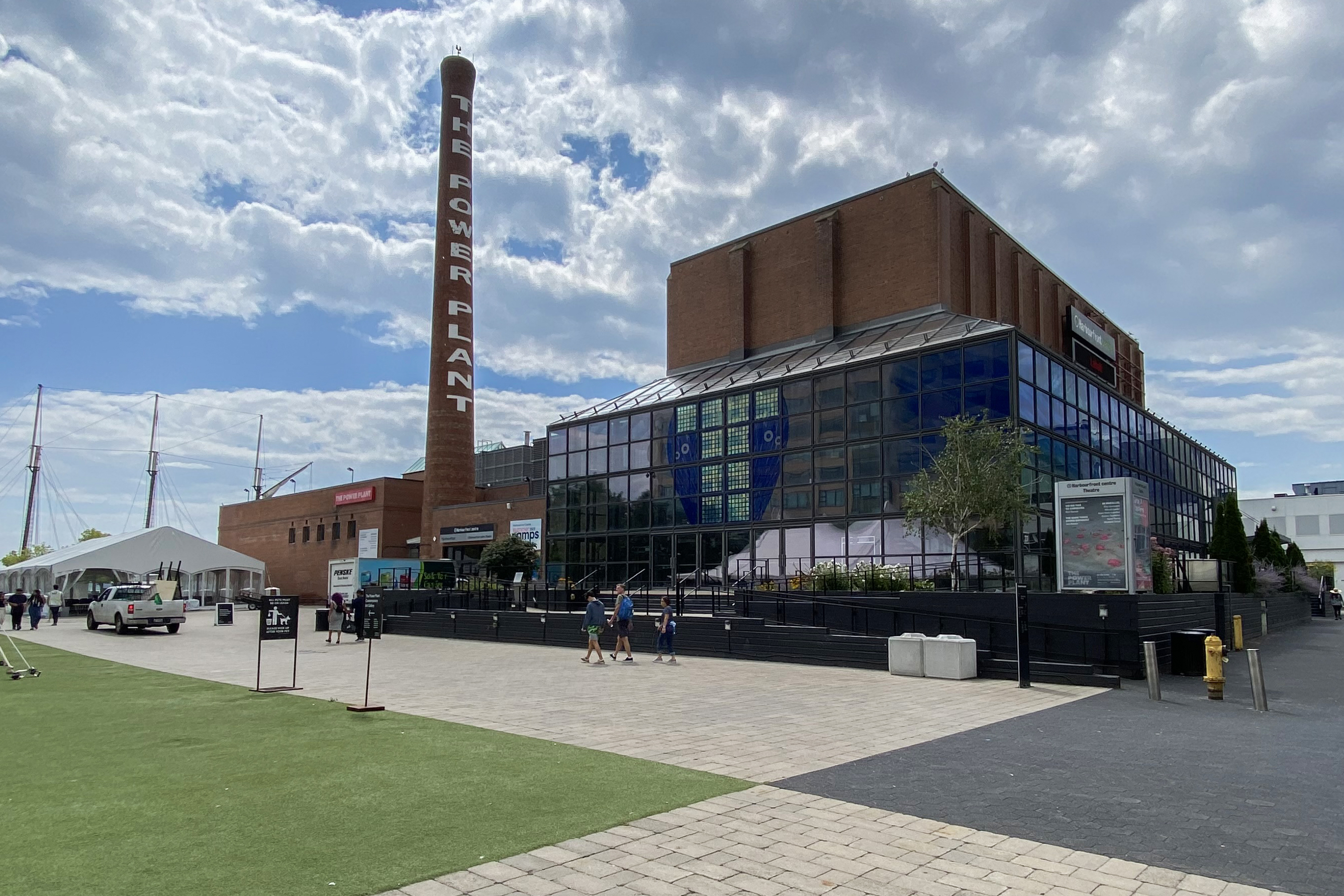
- Established: 1987
- Location: 231 Queens Quay West, Toronto, Ontario, Canada
- Coordinates: 43°38′18.33″N 79°22′55.42″W
- Type: Art gallery
- Visitors: 130,000 per year
- Director: Carolyn Vesely
- Curators: Adelina Vlas (Head of Curatorial Affairs); Frances Loeffler (Curator of Exhibitions)
- Public transit access: ■ Union; 509 Harbourfront; 510 Spadina
- Website: thepowerplant.org

The Power Plant Contemporary Art Gallery is a Canadian public art gallery located at Harbourfront Centre in the heart of Toronto, Ontario, Canada. The Gallery is a registered Canadian charitable organization.

Initially established in 1976 as the Art Gallery at Harbourfront, the Power Plant was officially opened in 1987. It displays new and recent work by living Canadian and international artists, hosting both major solo shows and thematic group exhibitions.

The gallery hosts a variety of free public programs, educational events and workshops. It produces artist books and related publications for research purposes and public dissemination. The Power Plant released more than 140 publications by the end of 2023.

== Background ==
The Power Plant Contemporary Art Gallery is a Canadian non-collecting, public art gallery dedicated exclusively to contemporary visual art from Canada and the world. It is a forum for the advanced artistic culture that offers a facility and professional support to a diverse group of living artists while engaging equally diverse audiences in their work. The Power Plant fulfills its mandate by generating: exhibitions that represent the range of advanced practice in visual arts; publications that provide in-depth explorations of contemporary art; lectures and symposia that encourage debate and further understanding; interpretative tools that invite visitors to question, explore and reflect upon their experiences; programming that incorporates other areas of culture at their intersection with visual art.

=== History ===
In 1976, Harbourfront Centre established the Art Gallery at Harbourfront, housed at the Bill Boyle Artport. Its founding director was Anita Aarons. Harbourfront Corporation provided the Art Gallery at Harbourfront with the opportunity to renovate the powerhouse on site as its new home. Constructed in 1926, the original powerhouse (and the Power Plant's current facility) housed the heating and refrigeration equipment for the massive Toronto Terminal Warehouse (now Queen's Quay Terminal) and its companion building, The Ice House (today Harbourfront Centre Theatre).

Peter Smith of Lett/Smith Architects was chosen to undertake the renovations, the design of which took into consideration both the history of the building and the demands on a contemporary art venue. Opened to the public on 1 May 1987, the Power Plant is easily recognized by its smokestack and exterior façade, both of which have been restored to maintain reference to its history.

In celebration of the Power Plant's 25th anniversary in 2012, the gallery introduced ALL YEAR, ALL FREE, offering free admission and open access to the public to all exhibitions. The Power Plant also marked the occasion with a redesign of its visual identity and added a new lobby, retail space and website, thus strengthening its position locally and internationally and allowing audiences to further engage with the rich and rewarding work of contemporary artists and thinkers. The gallery celebrated its 30th anniversary in 2017, coinciding with Canada's Sesquicentennial. In 2022, The Power Plant Contemporary Art Gallery is celebrating its 35th anniversary by introducing new ways to engage with diverse audiences through a brand new website, new communications channels, and the return of Power Ball in 2023.

=== Harbourfront Centre ===
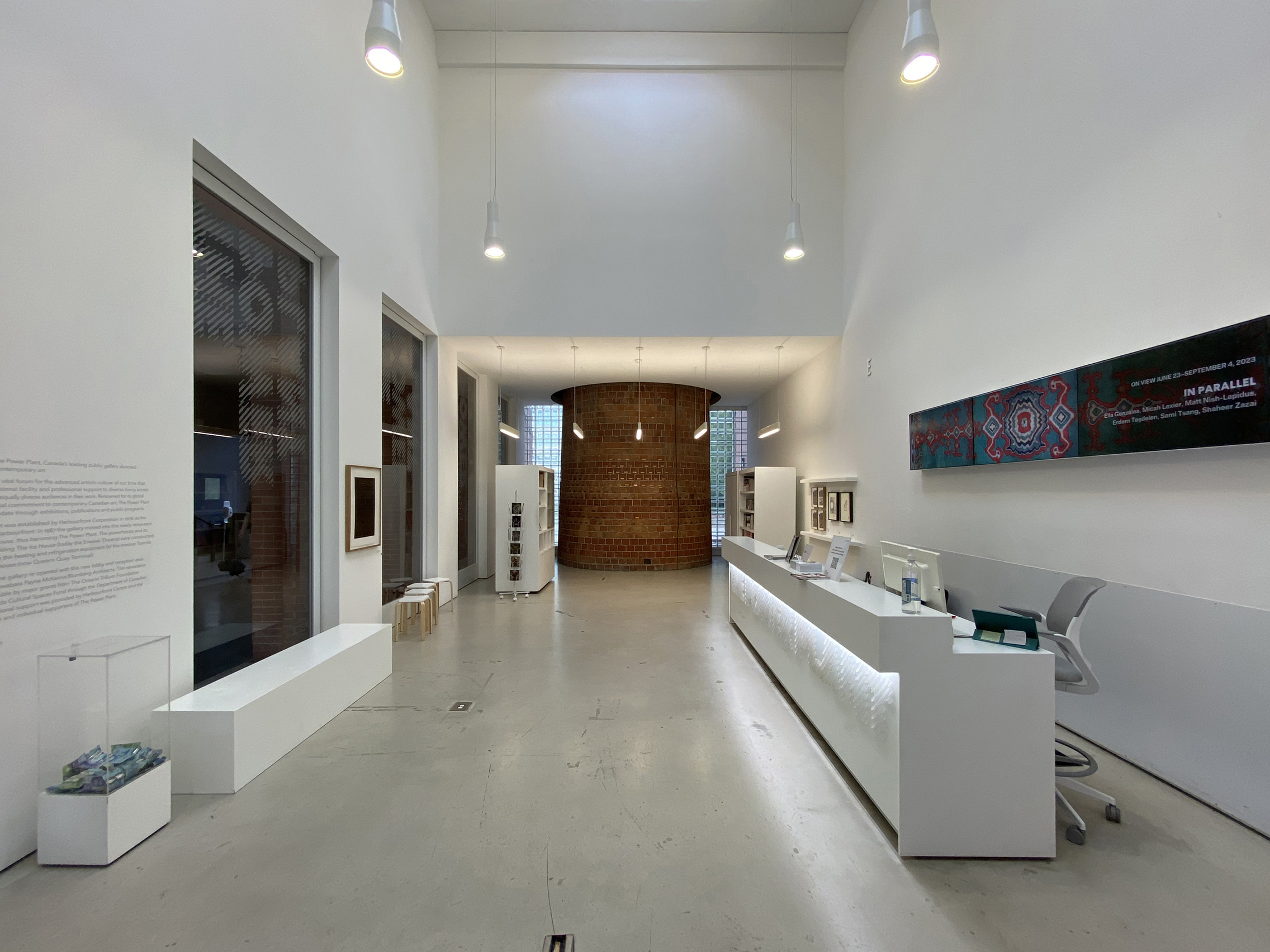
Front of House, The Power Plant

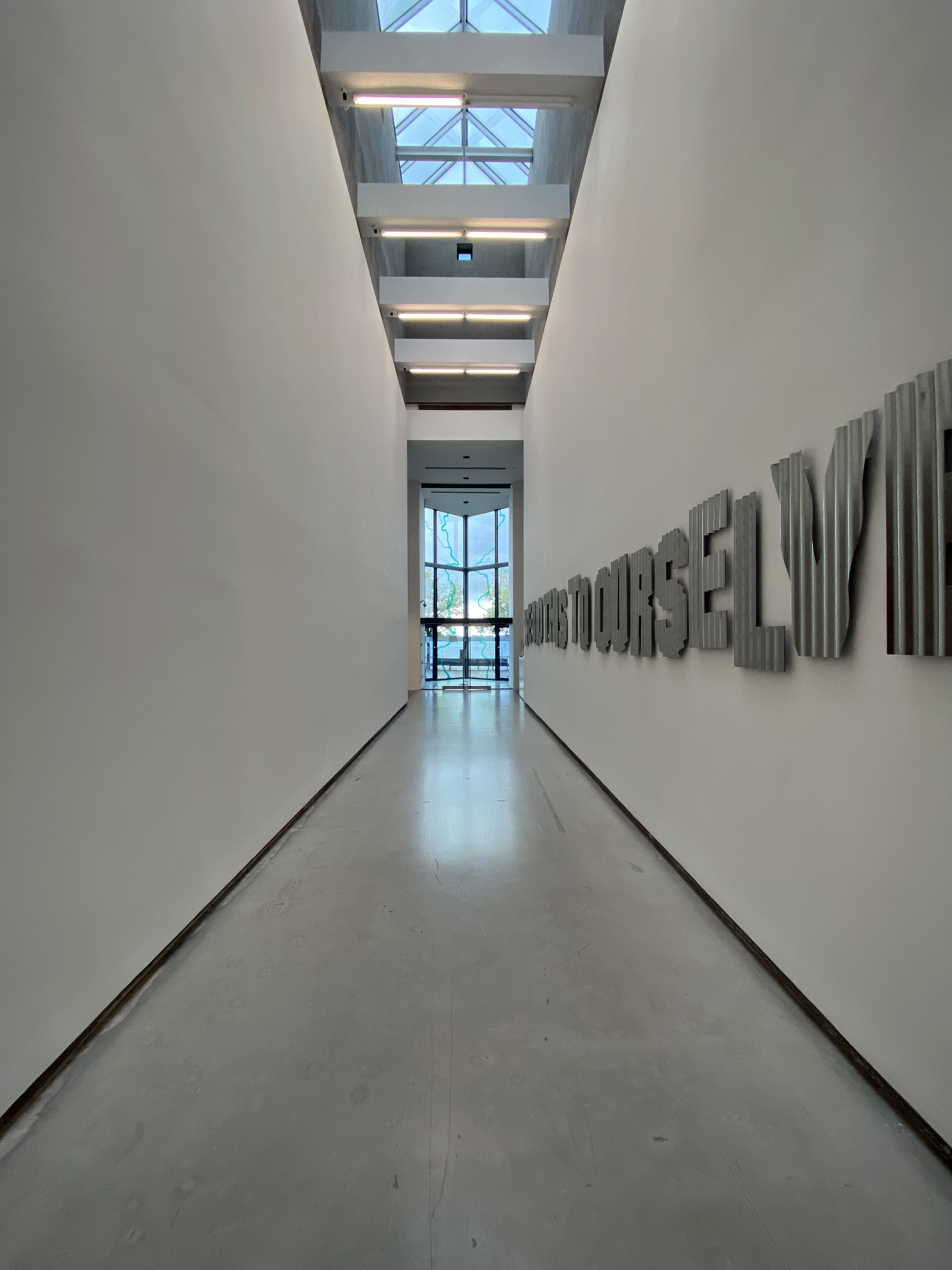
Ron Terada, WE DID THIS TO OURSELVES, 2023

The Power Plant is a key attraction of Harbourfront Centre. While the gallery is led by its own Board of Directors, Harbourfront Centre supports the gallery with maintenance and improvements to the physical site, as well as services and financial support.

For more than three decades, Harbourfront Centre has been at the cutting edge of all that is current and creative, bringing together the best in both in Canadian multiculturalism and around the world. From its beginnings as "Harbourfront Corporation," a federal Crown Corporation established in 1972, Harbourfront Centre was formed on January 1, 1991, as a non-profit charitable organization with a mandate to organize and present public events and to operate a ten-acre site on Toronto's lakefront, encompassing York Quay and John Quay (south of Queens Quay West). Since its inception, Harbourfront Centre has been introducing audiences to artists and art forms that would not normally be seen in commercial venues, exploring new and bold frontiers in the arts and creative expression

=== Past directors ===
- Carolyn Vesely (2022 - current)
- Gaetane Verna (2012 - 2022)
- Gregory Burke (2005 - 2011)
- Wayne Baerwaldt (2002 - 2004)
- Marc Mayer (1998 - 2001)
- Steven Pozel (1992 - 1997)
- Allan MacKay (1989 - 1991)
- William J. S Boyle (1987 - 1988)

== Exhibitions ==
Since its earliest exhibitions, the Power Plant has been dedicated to presenting new and recent work by Canadian artists along with their international peers, including thematic exhibitions and solo exhibitions by Canadian artists such as Sandra Brewster, Shuvinai Ashoona, Peter Doig, Geoffrey Farmer, Maria Hupfield and Annie Pootoogook. Solo exhibitions by international artists have included Sasha Huber, Miriam Cahn, Thomas J. Price, Fiona Banner, Pedro Cabrita Reis, Akram Zaatari and many more.

The Power Plant considers it crucial to pair Canadian and international artists (and their subject matter) to position the gallery in the local-global dialogue of contemporary art practice and to attract a culturally diverse audience. Throughout recent years The Power Plant has received many favourable reviews from local and international media outlets.

Christian Marclay's The Clock, a video called "a masterpiece of our time" by The Guardian, opened at the Power Plant in Fall 2012 after screenings at London's White Cube Gallery and New York's Paula Cooper Gallery, among other venues. The gallery partnered with Nuit Blanche to present special overnight hours and marathon viewings of the exhibition for the public. Toronto-based artist Micah Lexier's exhibition One, Two and More than Two in Fall 2013, called a "landmark [exhibition]" by Toronto Star, involved the participation of 101 artists/duos/collectives from in and around Toronto, presenting a wide-ranging, multi-generational portrait of a robust Toronto art community. Shelagh Keeley's Fall 2014 Fleck Clerestory Commission, Notes on Obsolescence, was acquired by the Vancouver Art Gallery. In Fall 2013, the Power Plant presented Toronto-born, Brooklyn-based artist Julia Dault’s first solo museum exhibition and monograph, Colour Me Badd. Dault’s work has been acquired by the Solomon R. Guggenheim Museum, New York, as well as the Art Gallery of Ontario, Toronto. Unfinished Conversation: Encoding/Decoding in Winter 2015 presented the work of Terry Adkins (US), John Akomfrah (UK), Sven Augustijnen (Belgium), Steve McQueen (UK), Shelagh Keeley (Canada) and Zineb Sedira (Algeria/France/UK), six artists whose practice is devoted primarily to commenting on history and memory. What connects all these artworks is the artists’ involvement with significant social issues confronting humanity today, and their profound desire to push formal boundaries in order to tackle them. Toronto Star described the exhibition as "Powerful, convincing and emotionally resonant". In Winter 2022, Kate Taylor form The Globe and Mail noticed about Sasha Huber's exhibition YOU NAME IT “there’s a powerful drama to her presence that takes the work beyond the political and into art.”

To further the reach and impact of the Power Plant's exhibitions, the gallery began to present virtual tours for online audiences unable to visit in person and to travel its exhibitions.

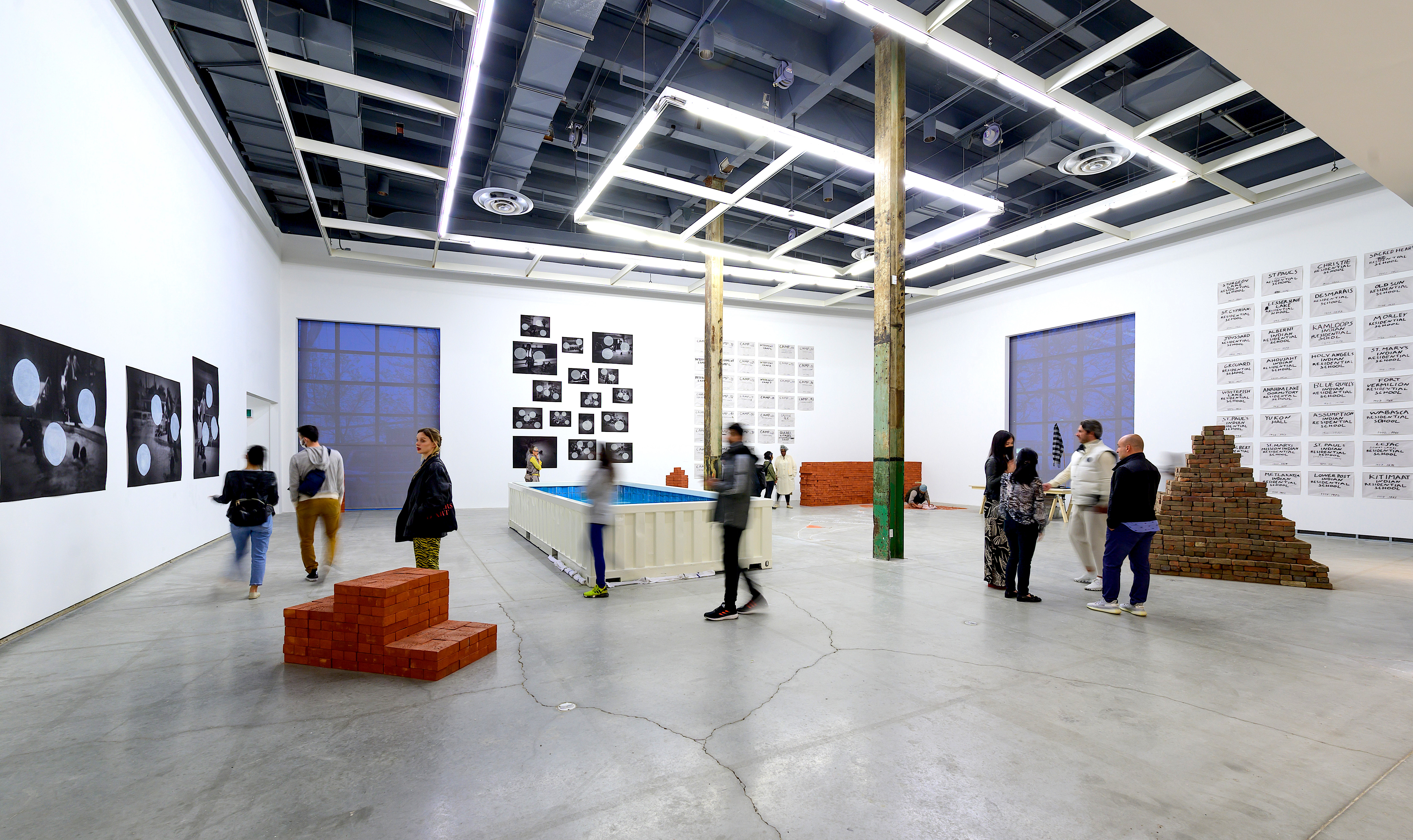
The Power Plant Contemporary Art Gallery. View of the exhibition STROKE by Paulo Nazareth (2022). Photo by Henry Chan.

Latest exhibitions include:

- Arctic/Amazon: Networks of Global Indigeneity (2022)
- Meriem Bennani, Life on the CAPS (2022)
- Paulo Nazareth, STROKE (2022)
- BREATHLESS, Flaka Haliti, Marguerite Humeau, Donna Kukama, Julius von Bismarck (2022)
- Hiwa K, Do you remember what you are burning? (2022)
- Sandra Brewster, By Way Of Communion (2022)
- Shona Illingworth, Topologies of Air (2022)
- Sasha Huber, YOU NAME IT (2022)
- Miriam Cahn, ME AS HAPPENING (2021)
- Nathan E. Carson, Cut from the same cloth (2020)
- Manuel Mathieu, World Discovered Under Other Skies (2020)
- Howie Tsui, From swelling shadows, we draw our bows (2020)
- Dawit L. Petros, Spazio Disponibile (2020)
- Naufus Ramírez-Figueroa, Asymmetries (2020)

=== Commissioning Program ===
In 2006, the Power Plant launched an annual Commissioning Program, which is an ongoing program to develop and premier major new works by Canadian and international artists. In 2014, the gallery introduced the Fleck Clerestory Commissioning Program in a gallery space dedicated solely to one site-specific installation each year, inaugurated by Toronto-based artist Shelagh Keeley.

The commissions reflect international, national and local dialogues, with content that references the specificity of Toronto's historical past and a global cultural present, all the while involving the local arts community and the general public. Commissioned works have since been acquired by national collecting institutions, toured to other galleries of significance outside Canada, and contributed to the cultural life of the region.

Past commissions include:

- Olinda Reshinjabe Silvano, Wilma Maynas, Ronin Koshi: Non Kenébo (2022)
- Paulo Nazareth: STROKE (2022)
- Sandra Brewster: By Way of Communion (2022)
- Sasha Huber: YOU NAME IT (2022)
- Shona Illingworth: Topologies of Air (2022)
- Manuel Mathieu: World Discovered Under Other Skies (2020)
- Howie Tsui: From swelling shadows, we draw our bows (2020)
- Naeem Mohaiemen: What we found after you left (2020)
- Naufus Ramírez-Figueroa: Asymmetries (2020)
- Dawit L. Petros: Spazio Disponibile (2020)
- Rashid Johnson: Anxious Audience (2019)
- Rashid Johnson: Anxious Audience (2019)
- Hajra Waheed: Hold Everything Dear (2019)
- Vincent Meessen: Blues Klair (2019)
- Thomas J Price: Ordinary Men (2019)
- Omar Ba: Same Dream (2019)
- Karla Black (2018)
- Beth Stuart: Length, Breadth, Thickness and—Duration (2018)
- Abbas Akhavan: variations on a landscape (2018)
- Kader Attia: The Field of Emotion (2018)
- Michael Landy: DEMONSTRATION (2017)
- Amalia Pica: ears to speak of (2017)
- Maria Hupfield: The One Who Keeps On Giving (2017)
- Kapwani Kiwanga: A wall is just a wall (2017)
- Latifa Echakhch: Cross Fade (2016)
- Maria Loboda: Some weep, some blow flutes (2016)
- Carlos Amorales: Black Cloud (2015)
- Tercerunquinto: Mine (2015)

== Public programs and outreach ==
In an effort to further the dialogue around access to contemporary art practices, The Power Plant Contemporary Art Gallery engages with wider public by offering a range of free public programs, such as lectures, symposia, film screenings, gallery tours, conversations with artists (Sunday Scene, In Conversation), workshops for children and youth (Power Kids, Power Youth Writing Workshops), and more.

== Publications and artist editions ==
To further the dialogue around contemporary art and art practices, the Power Plant produces publications, artist books and exhibition catalogues to accompany the shows.

Latest publications include:

- Sandra Brewster: By Way of Communion (2023)
- Hajra Waheed: Hold Everything Dear (2022)
- Sasha Huber: YOU NAME IT (2022)
- Nathan Eugene Carson: Cut from the same cloth (2022)
- Manuel Mathieu: World Discovered Under Other Skies (2022)
- Dawit L. Petros: Spazio Disponibile (2022)
- Miriam Cahn: ME AS HAPPENING (2022)
- Shona Illingworth: Topologies of Air (2022)
- Howie Tsui: From swelling shadows, we draw our bows (2021)
- Naeem Mohaiemen: What we found after you left (2021)
- Thomas J Price: ordinary men (2021)
- BREATHLESS (2021)
- Shuvinai Ashoona: Mapping Worlds (2021)
- Vincent Meessen: Blues Klair (2021)
- Shelagh Keeley: Traces of Labour (2020)
- Rashid Johnson: Anxious Audience (2020)
- Michael Landy: Open Call (2020)
- Mario Pfeifer: If you end up with the story you started with, then you're not listening along the way (2020)
- Franz Erhard Walther: Call to Action (2020)
- Kader Attia: The Field of Emotion (2020)
- Beth Stuart: Length, Breadth, Thickness and—Duration (2020)
- Alicia Henry: Witnessing (2019)
- Julia Dault (2019)
- Amalia Pica: please listen hurry others speak better (2018)
- The Unfinished Conversation: Encoding / Decoding (2016)
- Yto Barrada: A Guide to Fossils for Forgers and Foreigners (2016)
- Ulla von Brandenburg: It Has a Golden Red Sun and an Elderly Green Moon (2016)

The Power Plant also works closely with artists to produce editions - unique artworks that correlate with presented exhibitions, available for sale at the Power Shop. Past editions have included works by Olinda Silvano, Paulo Nazareth, Sandra Brewster, Sasha Huber, Shona Illingworth, Rashid Johnson, Mario Pfeifer, Thomas J Price, Omar Ba, Shuvinai Ashoona, Vivian Suter, Franz Erhard Walther, Ulla von Brandenburg, Lawrence Weiner, Micah Lexier, Wim Delvoye, Marcel Dzama, Pae White, Brian Jungen, Ian Wallace and more.
