= List of Swedish records in athletics =

The following are the national records in athletics in Sweden maintained by its national athletics federation: Svenska Friidrottsförbundet (SF).

== Outdoor ==
Key to tables: Awaiting ratification Record not kept by SF Not ratified or later rescinded by SF

=== Men ===
Event	Record	Athlete	Date	Meet	Place	Ref.
100 m	10.08 (+0.3 m/s)	Henrik Larsson	12 May 2024	Horst Mandl Memorial	Graz, Austria	
200 m	20.30 (+1.3 m/s)	Johan Wissman	23 September 2007	World Athletics Final	Stuttgart, Germany	
400 m	44.56	Johan Wissman	29 August 2007	World Championships	Osaka, Japan	
800 m	1:43.13	Andreas Kramer	12 July 2024	Herculis	Fontvieille, Monaco	
1000 m	2:14.96	Andreas Kramer	22 July 2025	Folksam Grand Prix	Varberg, Sweden	
1500 m	3:30.87	Samuel Pihlström	6 June 2025	Golden Gala	Rome, Italy	
Mile	3:49.70	Samuel Pihlström	12 June 2025	Bislett Games	Oslo, Norway	
2000 m	4:59.71	Kalle Berglund	10 August 2020		Sollentuna, Sweden	
3000 m	7:26.48	Andreas Almgren	16 May 2026	Shanghai Diamond League	Shaoxing, China	
5000 m	12:44.27	Andreas Almgren	15 June 2025	BAUHAUS-galan	Stockholm, Sweden	
5 km (road)	13:05	Andreas Almgren	5 April 2025		Drammen, Norway	
10,000 m	26:52.87	Andreas Almgren	16 March 2024	The TEN	San Juan Capistrano, United States	
10 km (road)	26:45	Andreas Almgren	11 January 2026	10K Valencia Ibercaja	Valencia, Spain	
10 km (road)	26:45	Andreas Almgren	22 February 2026	10K Facsa Castellón	Castellón de la Plana, Spain	
15 km (road)	41:47+	Andreas Almgren	20 September 2026	World Road Running Championships	Copenhagen, Denmark	
20,000 m (track)	59:41.32+	Emil Millán de la Oliva	4 September 2020	Memorial Van Damme	Brussels, Belgium	
20 km (road)	55:20+	Andreas Almgren	20 September 2026	World Road Running Championships	Copenhagen, Denmark	
One hour	20128 m	Emil Millán de la Oliva	4 September 2020	Memorial Van Damme	Brussels, Belgium	
Half marathon	58:41	Andreas Almgren	26 October 2025	Valencia Half Marathon	Valencia, Spain	
Half marathon	58:06	Andreas Almgren	20 September 2026	World Road Running Championships	Copenhagen, Denmark	
25,000 m (track)	1:18:06.2	Owe Malmqvist	7 August 1973		Stockholm, Sweden	
25 km (road)	1:13:34+	David Nilsson	1 December 2019	Valencia Marathon	Valencia, Spain	
30,000 m (track)	1:38:49.0	Magnus Bergman	28 August 2004		Kvarnsveden, Sweden	
30 km (road)	1:28:19+	David Nilsson	1 December 2019	Valencia Marathon	Valencia, Spain	
Marathon	2:05:57	Suldan Hassan	2 March 2025	Tokyo Marathon	Tokyo, Japan	
100 km (road)	6:20:51	Olle Meijer	27 April 2024	VXO Ultrafest	Växjö, Sweden	
24-hour run (road)	284.669 km	Elov Olsson	27 April 2025	VXO Ultrafest	Växjö, Sweden	
110 m hurdles	13.35 (+1.7 m/s)	Robert Kronberg	4 July 2001	Athletissima	Lausanne, Switzerland	
300 m hurdles	34.75	Carl Bengtström	26 April 2025	Xiamen Diamond League	Xiamen, China	
400 m hurdles	47.81	Oskar Edlund	12 August 2026	European Championships	Birmingham, United Kingdom	
2000 m steeplechase	5:22.58	Vidar Johansson	3 September 2024	Copenhagen Athletics Games	Copenhagen, Denmark	
3000 m steeplechase	8:05.75	Mustafa Mohamed	28 July 2007	KBC Night of Athletics	Heusden-Zolder, Belgium	
High jump	2.42 m	Patrik Sjöberg	30 June 1987		Stockholm, Sweden	
Pole vault	6.30 m	Armand Duplantis	15 September 2025	World Championships	Tokyo, Japan	
Long jump	8.44 m A (+1.8 m/s)	Michel Tornéus	10 July 2016		Monachil, Spain	
Triple jump	17.79 m (+1.4 m/s)	Christian Olsson	22 August 2004	Olympic Games	Athens, Greece	
Shot put	21.33 m	Hans Höglund	6 June 1975		Provo, United States	
Discus throw	71.86 m	Daniel Ståhl	29 June 2019		Bottnaryd, Sweden	
Hammer throw	80.14 m	Tore Gustafsson	4 July 1989		Lappeenranta, Finland	
Javelin throw	89.10 m	Patrik Bodén	24 March 1990	Texas Relays	Austin, United States	
Decathlon	8406 pts	Nicklas Wiberg	19–20 August 2009	World Championships	Berlin, Germany	
Decathlon	100m (wind) / Long jump (wind) / Shot put / High jump / 400m / 110m H (wind) / Discus / Pole vault / Javelin / 1500m; 10.96 (−0.4 m/s) / 7.25 m (−0.4 m/s) / 14.99 m / 2.05 m / 48.73 / 14.75 (+0.3 m/s) / 42.28 m / 4.50 m / 75.02 m / 4:17.05					
Mile walk (track)	5:38.18	Perseus Karlström	9 July 2017	London Grand Prix	London, United Kingdom	
5000 m walk (track)	18:32.56	Perseus Karlström	8 March 2019	AV Coles State Championships	Melbourne, Australia	
10,000 m walk (track)	37:57.02	Perseus Karlström	26 June 2022		Dublin, Ireland	
10 km walk (road)	39:40+	Perseus Karlström	9 April 2016	Poděbrady Walking Race	Poděbrady, Czech Republic	
15 km walk (road)	59:20	Perseus Karlström	9 April 2016	Poděbrady Walking Race	Poděbrady, Czech Republic	
20,000 m walk (track)	1:18:35.2 h	Stefan Johansson	15 May 1992		Bergen, Norway	
20 km walk (road)	1:17:39	Perseus Karlström	19 August 2023	World Championships	Budapest, Hungary	
Half marathon walk (road)	1:23:24	Perseus Karlström	24 October 2026	Lusatian Race Walking	Zittau, Germany	
35 km walk (road)	2:23:44	Perseus Karlström	24 July 2022	World Championships	Eugene, United States	
Marathon walk (road)	3:00:18	Perseus Karlström	15 August 2026	European Championships	Birmingham, United Kingdom	
50,000 m walk (track)	3:54:59.7 h	Bo Gustafsson	26 May 1990		Fana, Norway	
50 km walk (road)	3:44:49	Bo Gustafsson	30 September 1988	Olympic Games	Seoul, South Korea	
50 km walk (road)	3:44:35 (Note: Not ratified because of an insufficient number of starters.)	Perseus Karlström	17 December 2017		Melbourne, Australia	
4 × 100 m relay	38.63	Sweden; Peter Karlsson; Torbjörn Mårtensson; Lars Hedner; Patrik Strenius	2 August 1996	Olympic Games	Atlanta, United States	
4 × 100 m relay	39.35 (Note: Swedish record for club teams)	Malmö AI; Mikael Wennolf; Matias Ghansah; Lars Hedner; Thomas Leandersson	18 June 1994	Swedish Relay Championships	Uddevalla, Sweden	
4 × 200 m relay	1:26.43	Malmö AI; Lars Sjölin; Thomas Avebäck; Ulf Söderman; Lars Hedner	24 April 1988	Mt. SAC Relays	Walnut, United States	
4 × 200 m relay	1:25.33	Malmö AI; Mathias Sundin; Magnus Hansson; Jimisola Laursen; Niklas Eriksson	12 September 1998		Rennes, France	
4 × 400 m relay	3:02.57	Sweden; Erik Carlgren; Anders Faager; Kenth Öhman; Ulf Rönner	10 September 1972	Olympic Games	Munich, West Germany	
4 × 400 m relay	3:06.67	Malmö AI; Magnus Hansson; Rikard Rasmusson; Niklas Eriksson; Jimisola Laursen	14 June 1998	Swedish Relay Championships	Västerås, Sweden	
4 × 800 m relay	7:19.44	Malmö AI; Tobias Andersson; Joel Johansson; Torbjörn Johansson; Jörgen Zaki	8 June 1996		Huddinge, Sweden	
4 × 1500 m relay	15:09.3 h	Mälarhöjdens IK; Jan Persson; Lars Ericsson; Antero Rinne; Juha Moilanen	12 June 1983		Värnamo, Sweden	

=== Women ===
Event	Record	Athlete	Date	Meet	Place	Ref.
100 m	11.16 (+1.0 m/s)	Linda Haglund	26 July 1980	Olympic Games	Moscow, Soviet Union	
200 m	22.69 (+1.6 m/s)	Julia Henriksson	17 August 2024	Swedish Team Championships Final	Sollentuna, Sweden	
400 m	51.13	Moa Hjelmer	29 June 2012	European Championships	Helsinki, Finland	
600 m	1:27.04	Lovisa Lindh	13 May 2021		Langenthal, Switzerland	
800 m	1:58.77	Lovisa Lindh	6 July 2017	Athletissima	Lausanne, Switzerland	
1000 m	2:35.15	Lovisa Lindh	11 July 2017	Folksam Grand Prix	Gothenburg, Sweden	
1500 m	3:56.60	Abeba Aregawi	10 May 2013	Qatar Athletic Super Grand Prix	Doha, Qatar	
Mile	4:23.07	Abeba Aregawi	11 September 2015	Memorial Van Damme	Brussels, Belgium	
Mile (road)	4:29.0 h	Maria Akraka	1 February 1998		Santee, United States	
2000 m	5:47.17	Meraf Bahta	14 September 2021	Hanžeković Memorial	Zagreb, Croatia	
2000 m	5:37.12 (Note: All Bahta's results in the period from 24 May 2018 to 31 August 2019 were annulled due to an anti-doping rule violation.)	Meraf Bahta	19 June 2018	Meeting Elite	Montreuil, France	
2000 m	5:46.7+ h	Meraf Bahta	22 May 2016	Meeting International Mohammed VI d'Athlétisme de Rabat	Rabat, Morocco	
2000 m	5:47.1+ h	Meraf Bahta	6 May 2016	Doha Diamond League	Doha, Qatar	
3000 m	8:37.50	Meraf Bahta	21 July 2017	Herculis	Fontvieille, Monaco	
5000 m	14:49.95	Meraf Bahta	22 May 2016	Meeting International Mohammed VI d'Athlétisme de Rabat	Rabat, Morocco	
5 km (road)	15:04 Mx	Meraf Bahta	31 December 2021	Cursa dels Nassos	Barcelona, Spain	
5 km (road)	15:04 Mx	Sarah Lahti	3 May 2025	Tokyo : Speed : Race	Tokyo, Japan	
10,000 m	31:08.05	Meraf Bahta	4 May 2021		Stockholm, Sweden	
10 km (road)	30:55	Meraf Bahta	17 October 2026	Hytteplanmila	Hole, Norway	
15 km (road)	48:34+	Sarah Lahti	24 October 2021		Valencia, Spain	
One hour	17955 m	Sarah Lahti	4 September 2020	Memorial van Damme	Brussels, Belgium	
20 km (road)	1:04:41+	Sarah Lahti	24 October 2021		Valencia, Spain	
Half marathon	1:08:19 Mx	Sarah Lahti	24 October 2021		Valencia, Spain	
Half marathon	1:06:36 Mx (Note: This performance was annulled because Aregawi had failed to inform Antidoping Sverige, Sweden's national anti-doping organization, of her intention to come out of retirement at least six months before the competition.)	Abeba Aregawi	9 March 2025	Lisbon Half Marathon	Lisbon, Portugal	
Half marathon	1:10:19 Wo (Note: This is the best Swedish performance in a women-only race, but the Swedish Athletics Association does not keep a separate record for such races.)	Charlotta Fougberg	17 October 2020	World Half Marathon Championships	Gdynia, Poland	
25 km (road)	1:26:04+	Isabellah Andersson	31 October 2010	Frankfurt Marathon	Frankfurt, Germany	
30 km (road)	1:43:39+	Isabellah Andersson	31 October 2010	Frankfurt Marathon	Frankfurt, Germany	
Marathon	2:23:12	Abeba Aregawi	24 May 2026	Tartan Ottawa International Marathon	Ottawa, Canada	
50 km (road)	3:08:56 Wo	Hanna Lindholm	26 February 2023	Nedbank Runified Breaking Barriers 50km	Gqeberha, South Africa	
100 km (road)	7:20:48	Kajsa Berg	12 September 2015	IAU 100 km World Championships	Winschoten, Netherlands	
24-hour run (road)	250.647 km	Maria Jansson	23 October 2016	IAU European 24 Hour Championships	Albi, France	
100 m hurdles	12.47 (+1.4 m/s)	Ludmila Engquist	29 July 1996	Olympic Games	Atlanta, United States	
100 m hurdles	12.47 (+0.7 m/s)	Ludmila Engquist	28 August 1999	World Championships	Sevilla, Spain	
400 m hurdles	54.15	Ann-Louise Skoglund	30 August 1986	European Championships	Stuttgart, West Germany	
2000 m steeplechase	6:22.10	Linn Söderholm	5 May 2024	Internationales Läufermeeting	Pliezhausen, Germany	
3000 m steeplechase	9:23.96	Charlotta Fougberg	12 July 2014	Glasgow Grand Prix	Glasgow, Great Britain	
High jump	2.06 m	Kajsa Bergqvist	26 July 2003	Internationales Hochsprung-Meeting Eberstadt	Eberstadt, Germany	
Pole vault	4.83 m	Michaela Meijer	1 August 2020		Norrköping, Sweden	
Long jump	6.99 m (+1.9 m/s)	Erica Johansson	5 July 2000	Athletissima	Lausanne, Switzerland	
Triple jump	14.29 m (+0.7 m/s)	Carolina Klüft	8 June 2008		Växjö, Sweden	
Shot put	19.97 m	Axelina Johansson	16 May 2026	Big Ten Championships	Lincoln, United States	
Discus throw	66.61 m	Vanessa Kamga	14 September 2025	World Championships	Tokyo, Japan	
Hammer throw	73.31 m	Thea Löfman	25 May 2024	Hallesche Werfertage	Halle, Germany	
Javelin throw	61.96 m	Sofi Flink	16 August 2013	World Championships	Moscow, Russia	
Heptathlon	7032 pts	Carolina Klüft	25–26 August 2007	World Championships	Osaka, Japan	
Heptathlon	100m H (wind) / High jump / Shot put / 200m (wind) / Long jump (wind) / Javelin / 800m; 13.15 (+0.1 m/s) / 1.95 m / 14.81 m / 23.38 (+0.3 m/s) / 6.85 m (+1.0 m/s) / 47.98 m / 2:12.56					
3000 m walk (track)	12:25.1 h	Madelein Svensson	18 July 1993		Strömstad, Sweden	
5000 m walk (track)	21:09.26	Madelein Svensson	25 August 1992		Copenhagen, Denmark	
10,000 m walk (track)	42:13.70	Madelein Svensson	15 May 1992		Fana, Norway	
20 km walk (road)	1:33:37	Monica Svensson	9 October 2004		Copenhagen, Denmark	
20 km walk (road)	1:31:20 (Note: not ratified by SF but recognized by World Athletics)	Monica Svensson	5 May 2007		Vallensbæk, Denmark	
20 km walk (road)	1:32:51	Monica Svensson	15 July 2006		Malungfors, Sweden	
Half marathon walk (road)	1:42:00 (Note: The first performance better than 1:42:00 will be recognized as the first record in this event.)					
35 km walk (road)	2:52:47+	Monica Svensson	21 October 2007		Scanzorosciate, Italy	
Marathon walk (road)	3:50:00 (Note: The first performance better than 3:50:00 will be recognized as the first record in this event.)					
50 km walk (road)	4:10:59	Monica Svensson	21 October 2007		Scanzorosciate, Italy	
4 × 100 m relay	43.61	Sweden; Emma Rienas; Carolina Klüft; Jenny Kallur; Susanna Kallur	27 August 2005	Finland-Sweden athletics international	Gothenburg, Sweden	
4 × 100 m relay	44.44	Malmö AI; Irene Ekelund; Linnea Killander; Daniella Busk; Pernilla Nilsson	24 May 2014	Swedish Relay Championships	Kil, Sweden	
4 × 200 m relay	1:36.11	Malmö AI; Kristine Tånnander; Helena Johnsson; Lena Wallin; Lena Möller	13 June 1982	Swedish Relay Championships	Malmö, Sweden	
4 × 400 m relay	3:29.84	Sweden; Lisa Lilja; Moa Granat; Jonna Claesson; Marie Kimumba	11 June 2024	European Championships	Rome, Italy	
4 × 400 m relay	3:38.22	Ullevi FK; Alice Svantesson; Lovisa Lindh; Lisa Lilja; Matilda Hellqvist	1 August 2021	Swedish Relay Championships	Huddinge, Sweden	
4 × 800 m relay	8:30.51	Täby IS; Cilla Pettersson; Lena Nilsson; Linda Olsson; Monica Lundgren	1 July 2000		Antony, France	

=== Mixed ===
Event	Record	Athlete	Date	Meet	Place	Ref.
4 × 400 m relay	3:15.40	Sweden; Oskar Edlund; Marie Kimumba; David Thid; Elna Wester	29 June 2025	European Team Championships	Madrid, Spain	

== Indoor ==
=== Men ===
Event	Record	Athlete	Date	Meet	Place	Ref.	Video
50 m	5.83	Stefan Nilsson	21 February 1981		Grenoble, France		
60 m	6.52	Henrik Larsson	8 March 2025	European Championships	Apeldoorn, Netherlands		
150 m	16.40	André Brännström	11 February 2010	Botnia Games	Korsholm, Finland		
200 m	20.43	Erik Erlandsson	17 January 2025	Quality Hotel Games	Växjö, Sweden		
200 m	20.43	Erik Erlandsson	4 February 2025	Czech Indoor Gala	Ostrava, Czech Republic		
300 m	32.61	Johan Wissman	3 March 2006	Meeting Pas de Calais	Liévin, France		
400 m	45.33	Carl Bengtström	19 March 2022	World Championships	Belgrade, Serbia		
500 m	1:02.54	Felix Francois	17 February 2016	Globen Galan	Stockholm, Sweden		
800 m	1:45.09	Andreas Kramer	17 February 2021	Copernicus Cup	Toruń, Poland		
1000 m	2:20.56	Torbjörn Johansson	25 February 1996	GE Galan	Stockholm, Sweden		
1000 m	2:19.94	Viktor Idhammar	7 February 2026	Doc Hale Virginia Tech Invitational	Blacksburg, United States		
1000 m	2:20.55	Viktor Idhammar	19 January 2024	Hokie Invitational	Blacksburg, United States		
1500 m	3:33.47	Samuel Pihlström	22 February 2026	Copernicus Cup	Toruń, Poland		
Mile	3:54.78	Samuel Pihlström	4 February 2025	Czech Indoor Gala	Ostrava, Czech Republic		
2000 m	5:00.01	Samuel Pihlström	10 February 2024	Meeting Hauts-de-France Pas-de-Calais	Liévin, France		
3000 m	7:34.31	Andreas Almgren	17 February 2022	Meeting Hauts-de-France Pas-de-Calais	Liévin, France		
5000 m	13:39.71	Mustafa Mohamed	2 February 2006		Stockholm, Sweden		
50 m hurdles	6.46	Robert Kronberg	4 March 2001		Sindelfingen, Germany		
60 m hurdles	7.54	Robert Kronberg	9 March 2001	World Championships	Lisbon, Portugal		
60 m hurdles	7.54 (Note: not ratified by SF but recognized by World Athletics)	Robert Kronberg	18 March 2001		Glasgow, United Kingdom		
300 m hurdles	36.18 OT	Niclas Åkerström	5 February 2011	Finland-Sweden-Norway Indoor Match	Tampere, Finland		
High jump	2.41 m	Patrik Sjöberg	1 February 1987		Piraeus, Greece		
Pole vault	6.31 m	Armand Duplantis	12 March 2026	Mondo Classic	Uppsala, Sweden		
Long jump	8.38 m	Thobias Montler	18 March 2022	World Championships	Belgrade, Serbia		
Triple jump	17.83 m	Christian Olsson	7 March 2004	World Championships	Budapest, Hungary		
Shot put	21.49 m	Wictor Petersson	22 February 2025	Swedish Championships	Växjö, Sweden		
Weight throw	23.52 m (Note: This is the best Swedish performance, but no official record in the event was kept at the time. The first performance better than 23.52 m will be recognized as the first official record.)	Ragnar Carlsson	18 January 2021	JP Ventilation Indoor Games	Falun, Sweden		
Discus throw	67.62 m	Daniel Ståhl	25 February 2022	Swedish Championships	Växjö, Sweden		
Javelin throw	65.10 m	Pontus Bjärkvik	13 March 2011	World Indoor Throwing	Växjö, Sweden		
Heptathlon	6142 pts	Henrik Dagård	11–12 March 1995	World Championships	Barcelona, Spain		
Heptathlon	60m / Long jump / Shot put / High jump / 60m H / Pole vault / 1000m; 6.84 / 7.32 m / 15.27 m / 1.98 m / 7.87 / 4.80 m / 2:41.60						
Mile walk	5:32.34	Perseus Karlström	8 February 2025	USA 1 Mile Race Walking Championships	New York City, United States		
5000 m walk	18:27.95	Stefan Johansson	28 February 1992	European Championships	Genoa, Italy		
4 × 200 m relay	1:25.26	Sweden; Johan Wissman; Johan Engberg; Alexander Ljunggren; Andreas Mokdasi	29 January 2005	Aviva International Match	Glasgow, United Kingdom		
4 × 200 m relay	1:26.10	IF Göta; Johan Engberg; Simon Johansson; Fredrik Johansson; Christian Sjöberg	25 February 2007	Swedish Championships	Gothenburg, Sweden		
4 × 200 m relay	1:25.10 OT	Sweden; Jimisola Laursen; Mattias Sunneborn; Johan Wissman; Christofer Sandin	24 February 2001		Umeå, Sweden		
4 × 400 m relay	3:07.10	Sweden; Joni Jaako; Johan Wissman; Andreas Mokdasi; Mattias Claesson	12 March 2006	World Championships	Moscow, Russia		

=== Women ===
Event	Record	Athlete	Date	Meet	Place	Ref.	Video
50 m	6.17	Linda Haglund	22 February 1981		Grenoble, France		
50 m	6.17	Linda Haglund	22 February 1981		Grenoble, France		
60 m	7.13	Linda Haglund	12 March 1978	European Championships	Milan, Italy		
60 m	7.13	Linda Haglund	31 January 1981		Turku, Finland		
200 m	22.84	Julia Henriksson	23 February 2025	Swedish Championships	Växjö, Sweden		
400 m	52.04	Moa Hjelmer	3 March 2013	European Championships	Gothenburg, Sweden		
800 m	2:00.01	Maria Akraka	19 February 1998	GE Galan	Stockholm, Sweden		
1000 m	2:38.11	Malin Ewerlöf	25 February 1999	GE Galan	Stockholm, Sweden		
1500 m	3:57.91	Abeba Aregawi	6 February 2014	XL Galan	Stockholm, Sweden		
Mile	4:23.56	Wilma Nielsen	1 February 2026	Millrose Games	New York City, United States		
Mile	4:21.04	Wilma Nielsen	14 February 2026	BU David Hemery Valentine Invitational	Boston, United States		
3000 m	8:42.46	Meraf Bahta	8 February 2018	Meeting Ville de Madrid	Madrid, Spain		
Two miles	9:48.85	Ulrika Johansson	20 February 2010	Aviva Indoor Grand Prix	Birmingham, United Kingdom		
5000 m	15:06.49	Sara Wedlund	25 February 1996	GE Galan	Stockholm, Sweden		
50 m hurdles	6.67+	Susanna Kallur	21 February 2008	GE Galan	Stockholm, Sweden		
60 m hurdles	7.68	Susanna Kallur	10 February 2008	BW-Bank Meeting	Karlsruhe, Germany		
300 m hurdles	41.43 OT	Frida Persson	5 February 2011	Finland-Sweden-Norway Indoor Match	Tampere, Finland		
High jump	2.08 m	Kajsa Bergqvist	4 February 2006	Hochsprung mit Musik	Arnstadt, Germany		
Pole vault	4.81 m	Angelica Bengtsson	24 February 2019	All Star Perche	Clermont-Ferrand, France		
Long jump	6.92 m (2nd Jump)	Carolina Klüft	7 March 2004	World Championships	Budapest, Hungary		
Long jump	6.92 m (3rd Jump)	Carolina Klüft	7 March 2004	World Championships	Budapest, Hungary		
Long jump	6.92 m	Khaddi Sagnia	25 February 2018	Glasgow Grand Prix	Glasgow, United Kingdom		
Triple jump	14.12 m	Camilla Johansson	26 February 2000	European Championships	Ghent, Belgium		
Shot put	19.75 m	Axelina Johansson	20 March 2026	World Championships	Toruń, Poland		
Weight throw	23.73 m (Note: This is the best Swedish performance, but no official record in the event was kept at the time. The first performance better than 23.73 m will be recognized as the first official record.)	Ida Storm	15 February 2017		Malmö, Sweden		
Discus throw	57.09 m	Anna Söderberg	27 March 2010	Wexiö Indoor Throwing Competition	Växjö, Sweden		
Javelin throw	57.75 m	Anna Wessman	10 March 2012	World Indoor Throwing	Växjö, Sweden		
Pentathlon	4948 pts	Carolina Klüft	4 March 2005	European Championships	Madrid, Spain		
Pentathlon	60m H / High jump / Shot put / Long jump / 800m; 8.19 / 1.93 m / 13.29 m / 6.65 m / 2:13.47						
3000 m walk	12:14.01	Madelein Svensson	25 January 1992	Meeting Pas de Calais	Liévin, France		
4 × 200 m relay	1:36.86	Sweden; Pernilla Nilsson; Moa Hjelmer; Isabelle Eurenius; Josefin Magnusson	13 February 2016		Växjö, Sweden		
4 × 200 m relay	1:37.77	Malmö AI; Gunilla Ascard; Jessica Larsson; Helena Fernström; Maria Staafgård	16 January 1994		Malmö, Sweden		
4 × 200 m relay	1:36.36	Sweden; Annika Amundin; Helene Nordquist; Jenny Ljunggren; Linda Hansson	24 February 2001		Umeå, Sweden		
4 × 400 m relay	3:34.71	Sweden; Beatrice Dahlgren; Ellinor Stuhrmann; Erica Mårtensson; Louise Gundert	7 March 2004	World Championships	Budapest, Hungary		
