= 1969 European Athletics Championships – Men's 4 × 400 metres relay =

Men's 4 × 400 metres relay at the European Athletics Championships

The men's 4 × 400 metres relay at the 1969 European Athletics Championships was held in Athens, Greece, at Georgios Karaiskakis Stadium on 19 and 20 September 1969.

== Medalists ==
Gold	Gilles Bertould; Christian Nicolau; Jacques Carette; Jean-Claude Nallet; France
Silver	Yevgeniy Borisenko; Boris Savchuk; Yuriy Zorin; Aleksandr Bratchikov; Soviet Union
Bronze	Horst-Rüdiger Schlöske; Ingo Röper; Gerhard Hennige; Martin Jellinghaus; West Germany

== Results ==
=== Final ===
20 September

Rank	Nation	Competitors	Time	Notes
1st place, gold medalist(s)	France	Gilles Bertould; Christian Nicolau; Jacques Carette; Jean-Claude Nallet	3:02.30	CR
2nd place, silver medalist(s)	Soviet Union	Yevgeniy Borisenko; Boris Savchuk; Yuriy Zorin; Aleksandr Bratchikov	3:03.05	
3rd place, bronze medalist(s)	West Germany	Horst-Rüdiger Schlöske; Ingo Röper; Gerhard Hennige; Martin Jellinghaus	3:03.13	
4	Poland	Jan Balachowski; Stanisław Grędziński; Andrzej Badeński; Jan Werner	3:03.16	
5	Italy	Claudio Trachelio; Sergio Bello; Giacomo Puosi; Furio Fusi	3:04.1	
6	Great Britain	Gwynne Griffiths; Colin Campbell; Martin Winbolt-Lewis; John Robertson	3:04.2	
7	Sweden	Tore Nilsson; Michael Fredriksson; Lars Gustafsson; Ulf Rönner	3:08.9	
8	Belgium	René Bervoets; Tony Goovaerts; Karel Brems; Willy Vandenwyngaerden	3:10.8	

=== Heats ===
19 September

==== Heat 1 ====
Rank	Nation	Competitors	Time	Notes
1	West Germany	Horst-Rüdiger Schlöske; Gerhard Hennige; Ingo Röper; Martin Jellinghaus	3:06.0	Q
2	France	Jacques Carette; Christian Nicolau; Gilles Bertould; Jean-Claude Nallet	3:09.9	Q
3	Italy	Furio Fusi; Giacomo Puosi; Claudio Trachelio; Sergio Bello	3:09.9	Q
4	Belgium	René Bervoets; Tony Goovaerts; Karel Brems; Willy Vandenwyngaerden	3:10.4	Q
5	Bulgaria	Georgi Ganchev; Zlatko Valchev; Khristo Gergov; Georgi Bozhkov	3:10.9	
6	Greece	Haris Dimitriou; Stavros Tziortzis; Dionyssios Hatzidakis; Konstantinos Mihailidis	3:15.4	

==== Heat 2 ====
Rank	Nation	Competitors	Time	Notes
1	Great Britain	Gwynne Griffiths; John Robertson; Colin Campbell; Martin Winbolt-Lewis	3:28.9	Q
2	Soviet Union	Yevgeniy Borisenko; Yuriy Zorin; Boris Savchuk; Aleksandr Bratchikov	3:33.8	Q
3	Sweden	Tore Nilsson; Lars Gustafsson; Michael Fredriksson; Ulf Rönner	3:35.1	Q
4	Poland	Jan Balachowski; Stanisław Grędziński; Andrzej Badeński; Jan Werner	3:43.2	Q

== Participation ==
According to an unofficial count, 40 athletes from 10 countries participated in the event.

- Belgium (4)
- Bulgaria (4)
- France (4)
- Greece (4)
- Italy (4)
- Poland (4)
- Soviet Union (4)
- Sweden (4)
- Great Britain (4)
- West Germany (4)
