= 1971 European Athletics Championships – Men's 4 × 400 metres relay =

Men's 4 × 400 metres relay at the European Athletics Championships

The men's 4 × 400 metres relay at the 1971 European Athletics Championships was held in Helsinki, Finland, at Helsinki Olympic Stadium on 14 and 15 August 1971.

== Medalists ==
Gold	Horst-Rüdiger Schlöske; Thomas Jordan; Martin Jellinghaus; Hermann Köhler; West Germany
Silver	Andrzej Badeński; Jan Balachowski; Waldemar Korycki; Jan Werner; Poland
Bronze	Lorenzo Cellerino; Giacomo Puosi; Sergio Bello; Marcello Fiasconaro; Italy

== Results ==
=== Final ===
15 August

Rank	Nation	Competitors	Time	Notes
1st place, gold medalist(s)	West Germany	Horst-Rüdiger Schlöske; Thomas Jordan; Martin Jellinghaus; Hermann Köhler	3:02.94	
2nd place, silver medalist(s)	Poland	Andrzej Badeński; Jan Balachowski; Waldemar Korycki; Jan Werner	3:03.64	
3rd place, bronze medalist(s)	Italy	Lorenzo Cellerino; Giacomo Puosi; Sergio Bello; Marcello Fiasconaro	3:04.58	
4	Soviet Union	Yevgeniy Borisenko; Semyon Kocher; Vladimir Nosenko; Aleksandr Bratchikov	3:04.82	
5	Great Britain	John Wilson; Len Walters; Martin Bilham; David Jenkins	3:04.89	
6	France	Gilles Bertould; Christian Nicolau; Roger Vélasquez; Jean-Claude Nallet	3:04.99	
7	Sweden	Erik Carlgren; Michael Fredriksson; Anders Faager; Lars Stubbendorff	3:08.18	
8	Norway	Steinar Mo; Gøte Lundblad; Per Rom; Richard Simonsen	3:08.81	

=== Heats ===
14 August

==== Heat 1 ====
Rank	Nation	Competitors	Time	Notes
1	West Germany	Horst-Rüdiger Schlöske; Thomas Jordan; Martin Jellinghaus; Hermann Köhler	3:06.05	Q
2	Great Britain	John Wilson; Len Walters; Martin Bilham; David Jenkins	3:06.20	Q
3	Poland	Andrzej Badeński; Jan Balachowski; Waldemar Korycki; Jan Werner	3:06.23	Q
4	Norway	Steinar Mo; Gøte Lundblad; Per Rom; Richard Simonsen	3:06.67	NR Q
	Finland	Juhani Kotikoski; Ari Salin; Ossi Karttunen; Markku Kukkoaho	DQ	

==== Heat 2 ====
Rank	Nation	Competitors	Time	Notes
1	Soviet Union	Yevgeniy Borisenko; Vladimir Nosenko; Semyon Kocher; Aleksandr Bratchikov	3:06.43	Q
2	Sweden	Erik Carlgren; Michael Fredriksson; Lars Stubbendorff; Anders Faager	3:07.20	NR Q
3	Italy	Lorenzo Cellerino; Giacomo Puosi; Sergio Bello; Marcello Fiasconaro	3:07.28	Q
4	France	Gilles Bertould; Christian Nicolau; Roger Vélasquez; Jean-Claude Nallet	3:07.35	Q
5	Belgium	Willy Vandenwyngaerden; René Bervoets; Jean-Pierre Borlée; Gaby De Geyter	3:07.8	

== Participation ==
According to an unofficial count, 40 athletes from 10 countries participated in the event.

- Belgium (4)
- Finland (4)
- France (4)
- Italy (4)
- Norway (4)
- Poland (4)
- Soviet Union (4)
- Sweden (4)
- Great Britain (4)
- West Germany (4)
