= Ketema (name) =

Ketema can be a masculine given name or a patronymic. Notable people with the name include:

== Given name ==
- Ketema Benti (born 1945), Ethiopian sprinter
- Ketema Nigusse (born 1981), Ethiopian long-distance runner
- Ketema Yifru, Ethiopian statesman

== Patronymic ==
- Lemawork Ketema (born 1985), Ethiopian-born Austrian long-distance runner
- Tigist Ketema (born 1998), Ethiopian track and field athlete
- Yilma Ketema (born 1945), Ethiopian football forward
