= Cellerino =

Cellerino is a surname of Italian origin. Notable people with the surname include:

- Gastón Cellerino (born 1986), Argentine footballer
- Lorenzo Cellerino (born 1944), Italian sprinter
