= Thomas Jordan (sprinter) =

German sprinter (born 1949)

Medal record

Men's athletics

Representing West Germany

European Championships
Gold medal – first place	1971 Helsinki	4×400 m

Thomas Michael Jordan (born 15 March 1949 in Aachen) is a former sprinter who specialized in the 400 metres. He represented West Germany.

He won the gold medal in 4 × 400 metres relay at the 1971 European Championships together with teammates Horst-Rüdiger Schlöske, Martin Jellinghaus and Hermann Köhler. He also competed in the individual contest and finished fifth, with Köhler in the next place.

Jordan became West German champion in 1970, ahead of Köhler and Schlöske. In 1971 he won the bronze medal behind Köhler and Jellinghaus. He competed for the club Bayer 04 Leverkusen.
