= Felix Perez =

Felix Perez or Félix Pérez may refer to:

== Politicians ==
- Félix Manuel Pérez Miyares (1936–2024), Spanish politician
- Felix Perez Camacho (born 1957), American politician

== Musicians ==
- Félix Pérez Cardozo (1908-1952), Paraguayan harpist

== Sportspeople ==
- Félix Pérez (footballer) (1901-1983), Spanish footballer
- Félix Pérez (athlete) (born 1951), Venezuelan Olympic sprinter
- Félix Javier Pérez (1971–2005), Puerto Rican basketball player
- Félix Pérez (baseball) (born 1984), Cuban baseball player

== Other ==
- Félix Pérez Cardozo, Paraguay, Paraguayan district named after harpist
- Felix Perez, fictional Cuban-American character on Shining Time Station
- Bishop Felix Paz Perez, Roman Catholic Bishop of Imus, Philippines, known for denouncing the Human rights abuses of the Marcos dictatorship

== See also ==
- Pérez
