= 1974 European Athletics Championships – Men's 400 metres =

Men's 400 metres at the European Athletics Championships

The men's 400 metres at the 1974 European Athletics Championships was held in Rome, Italy, at Stadio Olimpico on 2, 3, and 4 September 1974.

The winning margin was 0.63 seconds which as of 2024 remains the only time the men's 400 metres has been won by more than 0.6 seconds at these championships since the introduction of fully automatic timing, although the winning margin in the 1938 European Athletics Championships was a hand-timed 0.8 seconds.

== Medalists ==
Gold	Karl Honz; West Germany
Silver	David Jenkins; Great Britain
Bronze	Bernd Herrmann; West Germany

== Results ==
=== Final ===
4 September

Rank	Name	Nationality	Time	Notes
1st place, gold medalist(s)	Karl Honz	West Germany	45.04	CR
2nd place, silver medalist(s)	David Jenkins	Great Britain	45.67	
3rd place, bronze medalist(s)	Bernd Herrmann	West Germany	45.78	
4	Markku Kukkoaho	Finland	45.84	
5	Ossi Karttunen	Finland	45.87	
6	Michael Fredriksson	Sweden	46.12	
7	Erik Carlgren	Sweden	46.15	
8	Francis Demarthon	France	46.90	

=== Semi-finals ===
3 September

==== Semi-final 1 ====
Rank	Name	Nationality	Time	Notes
1	Karl Honz	West Germany	46.24	Q
2	Francis Demarthon	France	46.28	Q
3	Markku Kukkoaho	Finland	46.29	Q
4	Erik Carlgren	Sweden	46.51	Q
5	Jürgen Utikal	East Germany	46.62	
6	Horst-Rüdiger Schlöske	West Germany	46.64	
7	Per-Olof Sjöberg	Sweden	46.68	
8	Roger Jenkins	Great Britain	47.30	

==== Semi-final 2 ====
Rank	Name	Nationality	Time	Notes
1	David Jenkins	Great Britain	45.93	Q
2	Ossi Karttunen	Finland	46.36	Q
3	Michael Fredriksson	Sweden	46.39	Q
4	Bernd Herrmann	West Germany	46.40	Q
5	Alfons Brijdenbach	Belgium	46.43	
6	Milorad Čikić	Yugoslavia	47.04	
7	Andreas Scheibe	East Germany	47.24	
8	Toine van den Goolberg	Netherlands	47.40	

=== Heats ===
2 September

==== Heat 1 ====
Rank	Name	Nationality	Time	Notes
1	Horst-Rüdiger Schlöske	West Germany	45.92	Q
2	Alfons Brijdenbach	Belgium	46.00	Q
3	Francis Demarthon	France	46.11	Q
4	Andreas Scheibe	East Germany	46.38	Q
5	Per-Olof Sjöberg	Sweden	46.63	q
6	Roger Jenkins	Great Britain	46.78	q
7	Roman Siedlecki	Poland	47.35	
	José Carvalho	Portugal	DNS	

==== Heat 2 ====
Rank	Name	Nationality	Time	Notes
1	Bernd Herrmann	West Germany	46.30	Q
2	Markku Kukkoaho	Finland	46.38	Q
3	Jürgen Utikal	East Germany	46.44	Q
4	Toine van den Goolberg	Netherlands	46.46	Q
5	Milorad Čikić	Yugoslavia	46.68	q
6	Michael Fredriksson	Sweden	47.01	q
7	Stephen Marlow	Great Britain	48.71	

==== Heat 3 ====
Rank	Name	Nationality	Time	Notes
1	Ossi Karttunen	Finland	46.50	Q
2	David Jenkins	Great Britain	46.60	Q
3	Erik Carlgren	Sweden	46.97	Q
4	Karl Honz	West Germany	46.98	Q
5	Josip Alebić	Yugoslavia	47.41	
6	Pasqualino Abeti	Italy	47.80	
	Kyriakos Onisiforou	Greece	DNS	

== Participation ==
According to an unofficial count, 20 athletes from 11 countries participated in the event.

- Belgium (1)
- East Germany (2)
- Finland (2)
- France (1)
- Italy (1)
- Netherlands (1)
- Poland (1)
- Sweden (3)
- Great Britain (3)
- West Germany (3)
- Yugoslavia (2)
