= Pat Marshall =

Trinidad and Tobago sprinter

Personal information
- Nationality: Trinidad and Tobago
- Born: 11 March 1946 (age 80) Trinidad

Sport
- Sport: Sprinting
- Event: 4 × 400 metres relay

Patrick Marshall (born 11 March 1946) is a Trinidadian sprinter. He competed in the men's 4 × 400 metres relay at the 1972 Summer Olympics.

== Competition record ==
Year	Competition	Venue	Position	Event	Notes
Representing Trinidad and Tobago
1972	Summer Olympics	Munich, West Germany	8th	4 × 400 m relay	3:03.58
