= Hajra Waheed =

Canadian artist

Hajra Waheed is a Montréal-based artist. Her multimedia practice includes works on paper, collage, sound, video, sculpture and installation. Waheed uses news accounts, extensive research and personal histories to critically examine multiple issues including: covert power, mass surveillance, cultural distortion and the traumas of displacement caused by colonialism and mass migration.

Waheed was born in 1980 in Canada. She has complex ties and relationships to North America, the Middle East and South Asia. She grew up within the gated compound of Saudi ARAMCO in Dhahran. She studied at the Art Institute of Chicago where she received her BFA in advanced painting and art history, in 2002. She moved to Montréal in 2005 and completed her MA at McGill University in 2007. At 34, Waheed received the Victor Martyn Lynch-Staunton Award for Outstanding Achievement as a Canadian Mid-Career Visual Artist. She was shortlisted for the Sobey Art Award in 2016. In 2022, Waheed received The Hnatyshyn Foundation's 2022 Mid-Career Award for Outstanding Achievement as an Artist.

Waheed's works are in the collections of the Museum of Modern Art, the British Museum, the Devi Art Foundation, Samdani Art Foundation, the Musée d'art contemporain de Montréal and the National Gallery of Canada.

== Exhibitions ==
- (In) The First Circle, Antoni Tàpies Foundation, Barcelona (2012)
- Lines of Control, Herbert F. Johnson Museum of Art, Ithaca, (2012)
- Field Notes and Other Backstories, Art Gallery of Windsor, Windsor, (2013)
- Collages: Gesture and Fragments, Musée d'art contemporain de Montréal, Montréal, (2014)
- Lines of Control, The Nasher Museum of Art, Duke University, (2014)
- La Biennale de Montréal, Musée d'art contemporain de Montréal, Montréal, (2014)
- Asylum in the Sea, Fonderie Darling, Montréal, 2015
- Still Against the Sky, KW Institute for Contemporary Art, London, (2015)
- The Missing One, Dhaka Art Summit, Dhaka, (2016)
- Sobey Art Award Exhibition, National Gallery of Canada, Ottawa, (2016)
- The Eighth Climate (What Does Art Do?), 11th Gwangju Biennale, Gwangju, (2016)
- Sea Change - Chapter 1, Character 1: In the Rough, Mosaic Rooms, London (2016)
- The Cyphers, BALTIC Centre for Contemporary Art, Gateshead, (2016)
- Farewell Photography, Biennale für aktuelle Fotografie, Kunstverein Ludwigshafen, Ludwigshafen, (2017)
- Turbulent Landings: NGC Canadian Biennial, Art Gallery of Alberta, Edmonton, (2017)
- Viva Arte Viva, Venice Biennale, Venice, (2017)
- The Video Installation Project, Musée d'art contemporain de Montréal, Montréal, (2017)
- Hold Everything Dear, The Power Plant, Toronto, (2019)
