= Marcello Fiasconaro =

Italian-South African athlete

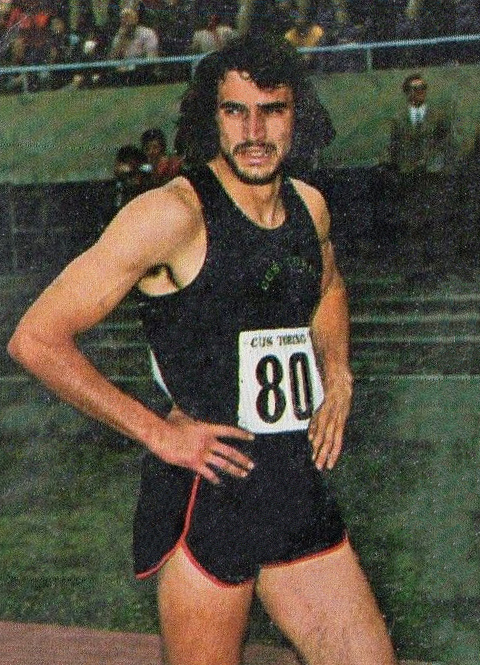
- Marcello Fiasconaro c. 1973

Personal information
- Full name: Marcello Luigi Fiasconaro
- Nickname: The March Hare
- Nationality: South Africa/ Italy
- Born: 19 July 1949 (age 77) Cape Town, Cape Province, Union of South Africa
- Height: 1.85 m (6 ft 1 in)
- Weight: 74 kg (163 lb)

Sport
- Sport: Athletics
- Events: 400 metres, 800 metres
Medal record
Men's athletics
Representing Italy
European Championships
Silver medal – second place	1971 Helsinki	400 m
Bronze medal – third place	1971 Helsinki	4×400 m

Marcello Luigi Fiasconaro (born 19 July 1949) is an Italian-South African athlete, who set a world record in the 800 m in 1973.

== Early life ==
Born in Cape Town to an Italian father and South African mother, Fiasconaro spent his youth in this South African coastal city.

His father, Gregorio, was born in Castelbuono, Sicily. A pilot for Italy during World War II, the elder Fiasconaro was shot down over East Africa and taken to South Africa as a prisoner of war. He married Mabel Marie, a South African woman from Pietermaritzburg, and settled in Cape Town, where he was appointed professor of music at the University of Cape Town.

He completed his schooling career at Rondebosch Boys' High School in 1967.

Marcello Fiasconaro's first passion was rugby. After playing for the Villagers Rugby Club in Cape Town, he was selected for the Western Province under 20 team.

He only switched to athletics at the age of 20. Fiasconaro discovered his running talent after the president of the Celtic Harriers Running Club at the time, Stewart Banner, suggested that the rugby team train with his runners to get fit. Banner became Fiasconaro's trainer.

== Athletics career ==
In his second 400 m race at Stellenbosch University's Coetzenburg track, Fiasconaro beat the favourites, Springbok athletes Danie Malan and Donald Timm.

In 1970 Fiasconaro won the 400 m at an athletics meeting in Potchefstroom, South Africa. His feat attracted the attention of Italian discus thrower Carmelo Rado, who asked about Fiasconaro's citizenship. When Rado heard of Fiasconaro's Italian origins, he drew the matter to the attention of the Italian athletics authorities.

Fiasconaro was invited to participate in Italy, where he set a new Italian record of 45.7 seconds over the 400 metres, winning the title of Italian Champion at this distance.

Already among the fastest 7 men in the world over 400 meters, he acquired an Italian passport in 1971. At this point Fiasconaro spoke very little Italian. Although he at first needed an interpreter to communicate, he learnt Italian from his teammates. He started living in Italy for six months of each year to race for the Italian Athletics Federation.

In 1971, Fiasconaro won a silver medal in the 400 metres at the European Championship in Helsinki. His time of 45.49 seconds was beaten in Italy only in 1981. He also won a bronze medal in the 4 × 400 m relay, in which he ran the final leg. In 1972 he set an indoor world record in the 400 metres with 46.1 seconds.

But Banner and his charge concluded that Fiasconaro lacked the speed for the 400 m, and should concentrate on the 800 m instead. In 1973 Fiasconaro broke the Italian 800 m record five times, and won the South African Championships over the same distance at Potchefstroom. During the same year he equalled Dicky Broberg's South African record of 1.44.7 – a joint feat that survived for 25 years afterwards.

Fiasconaro was a favourite to win the 800 metres at the 1974 European Championships in Rome. After leading for over 600 metres at a fast pace, he got tired and was passed by the surprise winner, Yugoslavia's Luciano Susanj. In the home straight Fiasconaro fell back to sixth place.

In 1974, Fiasconaro participated in 800 metres in the Sunkist Invitational Indoor Track Meet in Los Angeles.

== World record ==
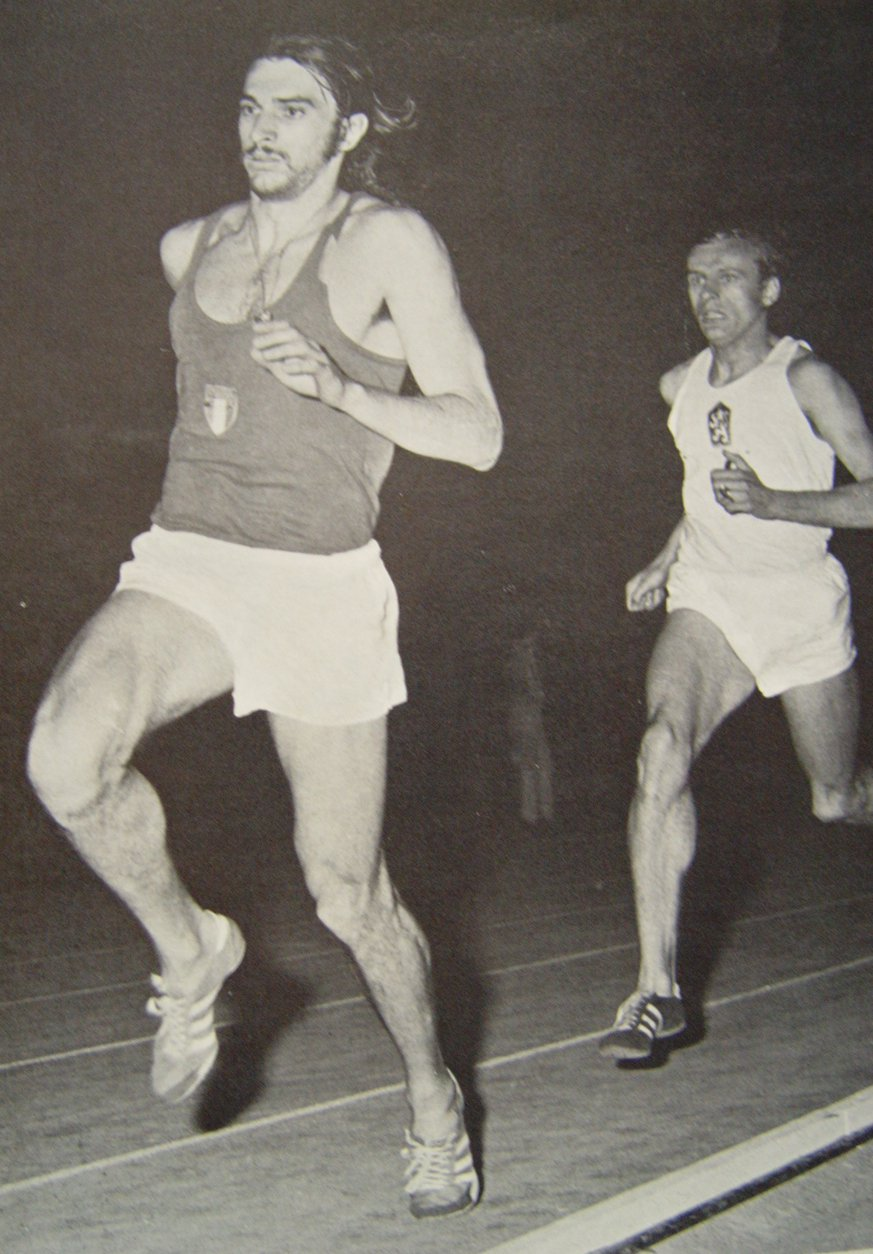
Plachý chasing Fiasconaro on 27 June 1973 in Milan

The most outstanding moment in Fiasconaro's career came in the evening of 27 June 1973, in Milan. The favourite was Jozef Plachý, a Slovak who had reached the 1968 final and the 1972 semi-final in the 800 m at the Olympic Games. Plachý possessed a devastating finish. Banner and Fiasconaro's tactics were to go out fast. The plan nearly backfired when Plachý managed to stay with Fiasconaro for most of the race, before finally falling back over the last 150 metres.

On his return to South Africa, Fiasconaro went on 10-day partying spree. He paid the toll for his overindulgence when he was easily beaten in the United States soon afterwards. In trying to recapture his form, he overtrained. A stress fracture in his foot signalled the beginning of the end of his brief meteoric career.

At the 1974 European Championships, he developed problems with his Achilles tendon. The constant injuries and pressure to compete led him to take a year-long sabbatical from athletics.

Fiasconaro's world record of 1:43.7 seconds was beaten at world level three years later, but is still the Italian record – perhaps the longest-lived Italian athletics record in any discipline.

== Other sports and acting ==
In 1973 he play in My Way in role of a runner. He returned to play rugby union in Italy in 1976, playing with CUS Milan (University team) for two seasons.

His talent as an all-round athlete was tested in an appearance in the 1976 heat of The Superstars, a television sports competition that pitted athletes against one another in disciplines other than their own. Although he placed 5th overall, Fiasconaro came first in the 50 m swimming and soccer skills events, and second in 15m pistol shooting.

== Later life ==
After suffering from injuries which prevented him from participating in the Montreal Olympics in 1976, Fiasconaro returned to South Africa in 1978, where he married his girlfriend, Sally.

In 2009, he was living in Johannesburg's Benmore suburb. The Italian consul to South Africa awarded Fiasconaro the Cavaliere Ordine al Merito della Repubblica Italiana, described as "the highest honour that can be bestowed on an Italian civilian".

== National titles ==
He won 5 national championships at individual senior level.

- Italian Athletics Championships
  - 400 metres: 1971, 1972, 1973
- Italian Indoor Athletics Championships
  - 400 metres: 1972
  - 800 metres: 1975

== See also ==
- Italian all-time lists – 400 metres
- Italian all-time lists – 800 metres
- Italy national relay team
- FIDAL Hall of Fame

Records
Preceded by (New Zealand) Peter Snell (Australia) Ralph Doubell (United States) Dave Wottle	Men's 800 metres World Record Holder; 1973-06-27 – 1976-07-16	Succeeded by (Cuba) Alberto Juantorena
Preceded by (Finland) Pekka Vasala	European Record Holder Men's 800 m 27 June 1973 – 4 July 1979	Succeeded by (United Kingdom) Sebastian Coe
