= Laszlo Ubori =

Yugoslav sprinter

Personal information
- Nationality: Yugoslav
- Born: 5 August 1951 (age 74) Novi Kneževac, SFR Yugoslavia
- Height: 177

Sport
- Sport: Sprinting
- Event: 4 × 400 metres relay

Laszlo Ubori (born 5 August 1951) is a Yugoslav sprinter. He competed in the men's 4 × 400 metres relay at the 1972 Summer Olympics. He currently lives in Subotica. He was also part of Men's 4x400 meters when they won 3 times Balkans olympics
