= Shelagh Keeley =

Canadian multi-disciplinary artist

- Born: 1954 (age 71–72); Oakville, Ontario
- Education: York University BFA (1977)
- Known for: drawings and immersive installations
- Awards: Governor General’s Award in Visual and Media Arts; 2017
- Website: Official website

Shelagh Keeley (born 1954) is a Canadian multi-disciplinary artist. She is best known for her drawings and immersive installations, but her practice also includes photography, film, collaborative performances, and artist's books.

== Life ==
Keeley was born in Oakville, Ontario and graduated with an Honours BFA in Art History / Anthropology from York University, Toronto, in 1977. After spending 23 years in New York City and Paris, Keeley is now based in Toronto.

== Work ==
Keely has exhibited in Canada and internationally since the 1980s. Her work has a sustained engagement with the theme of global labour, including a permanent steel installation inscribed with workers' slogans in the Jindal steel factory in Mumbai (2005), and a site-specific installation in the tea pavilion in Cao Yang Park, Shanghai, the site of a workers' housing project (2009). Her recent production includes a commission by The Power Plant, Toronto, to create a new installation for the venue's large clerestory walls (2014/15) and by MoMA, Library and Archives, NYC, for a new research / performance with choreographer Lin Snelling (2014/15).

In 2010, the Robert McLaughlin Gallery and the McMaster University Museum of Art co-produced a 25-year retrospective of Keeley's work that also travelled to the Confederation Centre Art Gallery in Charlottetown, PEI, and the Dunlop Art Gallery in Regina, Saskatchewan.

== Awards ==
Keeley was the recipient of a Governor General’s Award in Visual and Media Arts in 2017.

== Collections ==
Her work is in the collections of the Museum of Modern Art, NYC, the Walker Art Centre, Minneapolis, the Stedelijk Museum, Amsterdam, the National Gallery of Canada, Ottawa, the Vancouver Art Gallery, the Ryerson Image Centre, Toronto and the San Francisco Museum of Modern Art

== Selected exhibitions and performances ==
- An Encyclopedia of Memory and Slowness (solo), Museum of Contemporary Canadian Art (now Museum of Contemporary Art), Toronto (2007).
- Construction Site: Identity and Place, Kamloops Art Gallery, Kamloops, BC (2010).
- Here and There: Photography and Video Works on Immigration, Ryerson Image Centre, Toronto (2013).
- Notes on Obsolescence (solo), The Power Plant, Toronto (2014–2015).
- Border Cultures, Part 3 (security, surveillance), Art Gallery of Windsor (2015).
- The Unfinished Conversation: Encoding/Decoding, Museu Colecao Berardo, Lisbon (2016) and The Power Plant, Toronto (2015).
- When Form Becomes Attitude, Contemporary Calgary (2016).
- 4th Canadian Biennial, National Gallery of Canada, Ottawa (2017).
- Persistence, Vancouver Art Gallery, Vancouver (2017).
- Through the Memory Atlas: 40 Years of Collecting, Kamloops Art Gallery, Kamloops (2018).
- An Embodied Haptic Place (solo), Museum of Contemporary Art, Toronto, ON (2020).
