= Hassan Osman (athlete) =

Malaysian sprinter

Personal information
- Nationality: Malaysian
- Born: Mohamed Hassan bin Osman; 21 July 1948 (age 77)

Sport
- Sport: Sprinting
- Event: 4 × 400 metres relay

Mohamed Hassan bin Osman (born 21 July 1948) is a Malaysian sprinter. He competed in the men's 4 × 400 metres relay at the 1972 Summer Olympics.
