= 2000 European Athletics Indoor Championships – Women's triple jump =

The women's triple jump event at the 2000 European Athletics Indoor Championships was held on February 25–26.

== Medalists ==
Gold	Silver	Bronze
Tatyana Lebedeva; Russia	Cristina Nicolau; Romania	Iva Prandzheva; Bulgaria

== Results ==
=== Qualification ===
Qualifying perf. 14.10 (Q) or 8 best performers (q) advanced to the Final.

Rank	Athlete	Nationality	#1	#2	#3	Result	Note
1	Iva Prandzheva	Bulgaria	14.20			14.20	Q
2	Tatyana Lebedeva	Russia	13.87	14.14		14.14	Q
3	Olena Hovorova	Ukraine	14.07	14.12		14.12	Q
4	Rodica Petrescu	Romania	14.00	14.12		14.12	Q
5	Camilla Johansson	Sweden	14.05	–	–	14.05	q, NR
6	Cristina Nicolau	Romania	13.95	13.76	X	13.95	q
7	Adelina Gavrilă	Romania	13.69	13.69	13.87	13.87	q
8	Oksana Rogova	Russia	13.53	13.59	13.78	13.78	q
9	Carlota Castrejana	Spain	13.57	13.59	13.24	13.59	
10	Marie-Veronique Mazarin	France	13.53	12.62	13.26	13.53	
11	Lene Espegren	Norway	13.27	13.36	13.46	13.46	
12	Anja Valant	Slovenia	13.23	X	13.40	13.40	
13	Dimitra Markou	Greece	X	X	13.28	13.28	
14	Sandrine Domain	France	13.05	12.00	13.17	13.17	
15	Yevgeniya Stavchanska	Ukraine	13.15	X	12.93	13.15	
16	Sandra Swennen	Belgium	12.74	13.12	X	13.12	

=== Final ===
Rank	Athlete	Nationality	#1	#2	#3	#4	#5	#6	Result	Note
1st place, gold medalist(s)	Tatyana Lebedeva	Russia	14.50	14.68	14.66	X	–	–	14.68	
2nd place, silver medalist(s)	Cristina Nicolau	Romania	14.63	14.49	X	14.44	–	X	14.63	
3rd place, bronze medalist(s)	Iva Prandzheva	Bulgaria	X	X	X	14.26	X	14.63	14.63	
4	Olena Hovorova	Ukraine	X	14.25	14.34	X	14.55	14.38	14.55	PB
5	Oksana Rogova	Russia	13.65	14.14	14.28	14.06	14.08	13.93	14.28	PB
6	Rodica Petrescu	Romania	14.00	14.16	X	X	13.19	X	14.16	
7	Camilla Johansson	Sweden	13.88	X	13.00	13.40	14.12	14.00	14.12	NR
8	Adelina Gavrilă	Romania	X	13.69	13.39	13.77	13.80	13.90	13.90	
