= Shoangizaw Worku =

Ethiopian sprinter

Personal information
- Nationality: Ethiopian
- Born: 20 October 1946 (age 79)

Sport
- Sport: Sprinting
- Event: 4 × 400 metres relay

Shoangizaw Worku (born 20 October 1946) is an Ethiopian sprinter. He competed in the men's 4 × 400 metres relay at the 1972 Summer Olympics.
