= Yilma Ketema =

Ethiopian footballer

Personal information
- Date of birth: 1945 (age 80–81)
- Place of birth: Ethiopia
- Height: 1.70 m (5 ft 7 in)
- Position: Forward

Senior career*
Years	Team	Apps	(Gls)
????–1964	Omedla FC		
1964–1965	Aris	5	(0)
1965–1967	Galatasaray		
1968	Boston Beacons	5	(1)

International career
1960s	Ethiopia	2	(2)
- * Club domestic league appearances and goals

Yilma Ketema (born 1945) is an Ethiopian former footballer who played as a forward. He was the first black footballer to play in both the Greek Alpha Ethniki and the Turkish Süper Lig, as well as the first African footballer to play in Greece.

== Career ==
Ketema started his career at Omedla FC in Ethiopia. While playing for Omedla, he was spotted by a Greek expatriate in the country, who alerted Greek club Aris Thessaloniki about the player. He signed for Aris on 3 September 1964, at the age of 19, becoming both the first Ethiopian professional footballer to play in Europe and the first black professional player in Greece. He made his debut for the club in the 1964–65 Inter-Cities Fairs Cup, where he played both matches against Italian side Roma, notably being awarded the man of the match after a 0–0 draw in Thessaloniki, where he had a goal disallowed.

Despite the promising start at Aris, there were bureaucratic issues, including with Ketema's visa due to communication issues with the Ethiopian Football Federation. These were solved by January 1965, but he suffered a knee injury around that time. Shortly before returning from injury, he demanded more money from the club's management, delaying a possible return. Despite attempts to renew his contract, the Greek Football Federation introduced a ban on foreign players in the Greek league, forcing Ketema to leave the club.

Shortly after, he joined Turkish club Galatasaray, where he spent the next two seasons, becoming the first black player to play in the Süper Lig. After leaving Galatasaray, he tried his luck in Austria and the Netherlands, before joining North American Soccer League side Boston Beacons, where he scored one goal in five matches.

== International career ==
Ketema played two matches for the Ethiopia national team, scoring two goals. In 1965, he played in a friendly against his former club Aris.

== Personal life ==
Following his time in Boston, Ketema moved to New York. After a few years there, he settled in Alexandria, Virginia, where he works as a taxi driver.
