= Lorenzo Cellerino =

Italian former sprinter

Personal information
- Full name: Gian Lorenzo Cellerino
- Nationality: Italian
- Born: 30 December 1944 (age 81) Alessandria, Italy
- Height: 1.76 m (5 ft 9 1/2 in)
- Weight: 75 kg (165 lb)

Sport
- Country: Italy
- Sport: Athletics
- Event: Sprint

Achievements and titles
- Personal best: 400 m: 46"9 (1972)
Medal record
Men's athletics
Representing Italy
European Championships
Bronze medal – third place	1971 Helsinki	4×400 m
Mediterranean Games
Gold medal – first place	1971 Izmir	4×400 m

Lorenzo Cellerino (born 30 December 1944) is an Italian former sprinter

== Biography ==
He competed in the 1972 Summer Olympics.

== Olympic results ==
Year	Competition	Venue	Position	Event	Time	Notes
1971	Olympic Games	(West Germany) Munich	Heat	4 × 400 m relay	3:09.7	

== National titles ==
He has won 2 times the team national championship.

- 1 win in the 4 × 100 m relay (1969)
- 1 win in the 4 × 400 m relay (1973)
