= Erik Carlgren =

Swedish sprinter

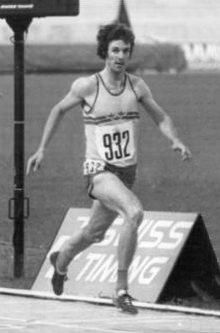
- Carlgren at the 1974 European Championships

Personal information
- Nationality: Swedish
- Born: 4 December 1946 (age 79) Malmö, Sweden
- Height: 184 cm (6 ft 0 in)
- Weight: 71 kg (157 lb)

Sport
- Sport: Sprinting
- Event: 400 m
- Club: Västerås IK

Achievements and titles
- Personal best: 46.09 (1973)

Paul Erik Olofsson Carlgren (born 4 December 1946) is a Swedish retired sprinter. He was part of Swedish teams that placed seventh in the 4 × 400 m relay at the 1972 Olympics and 1971 and 1974 European Championships. At the 1974 European Championships he also finished seventh in the individual 400 m event.

Carlgren finished third behind David Jenkins in the 400 metres event at the British 1973 AAA Championships.
