= Sandra Brewster =

Canadian visual artist based in Toronto

- Born: Toronto, Ontario
- Education: York University; University of Toronto

Sandra Brewster (born 1973) is a Canadian visual artist based in Toronto. Her work is multidisciplinary in nature, and deals with notions of identity, representation and memory; centering Black presence in Canada.

== Early life ==
Brewster was born to a Guyanese immigrant family and grew up in Pickering, Ontario. She completed her Bachelor of Fine Arts at York University in 1997 and her Master of Visual Studies at University of Toronto in 2017. Her thesis exhibition, titled A Trace | Evidence of time past, was shown at the Art Museum at the University of Toronto.

== Career and work ==
Brewster's early works focused on traditional portraiture. She later transitioned towards drawings, gel transfers, and metallic sculptures. Her work has been exhibited in Canada, the US, the Caribbean and South Africa. She was an artist-in-residence in Brazil, Canada, Trinidad and Tobago and South Africa, and her work has been published in numerous magazines, including Caribbean Beat and The Walrus. Her work usually focuses on identity and representation, centered on the migration of the Caribbean people.

An example of her earlier works is Strip, 2008. It consists of drawings interpreting a poem by artist Joseph Daly.

One of Brewster's most prominent bodies of work is Smiths – a series of drawings that question identity and representation. Smiths began in 2014 when Brewster started cutting pages with the name "Smith" from phone books, and transposed these pages over afro-headed, faceless individuals. The series combines the varied personalities, desires, and personal stories of these people by applying a unified visual treatment, which removed any sense of individuality. Brewster eventually developed these drawings into a series of paintings that illustrate the impact of gun violence on young black men in Toronto.

== Exhibitions ==
Brewster's work has been shown in several group exhibitions, including alongside artists Nadijah Robinson and Curtia Wright in "No Vacancy" – a 2017 show about displacement held at the Scarborough Arts' Bluffs Gallery and curated by Alyssa Fearon. Her work was also included in the 2017 exhibition, "Position As Desired", curated by Kenneth Montague of The Wedge Collection (Wedge Curatorial Projects) and held at the Art Gallery of Windsor. Other group exhibitions include Undomesticated, at Koffler Gallery, Toronto, 2019; Here we are Here: Black Canadian Contemporary Art organized by the Royal Ontario Museum, Toronto, where it was on display in 2018 before touring to the Montreal Museum of Fine Arts in 2018 and the Art Gallery of Nova Scotia in 2019; Are You My Mother? at the Dunlop Art Gallery, Regina, 2019; and Position As Desired: Exploring African Canadian Identity at the Windsor Art Gallery in 2017. Her solo exhibitions include Town Girls Beneath at YYZ Artists' Outlet, Toronto, 2019; "Sandra Brewster: Blur" at the Art Gallery of Ontario, 2019; "It's all a blur", Georgia Scherman Projects at the 2017 Scotiabank CONTACT Photography Festival; and "Mohammeds", at Alice Yard in 2013. Her work appears on the cover of publications including (Small Axe 29, 2009) and Thicker Than Water (Peekash Press, 2018).

== Awards ==
Sandra Brewster was awarded the title of Artist in Education by the Ontario Arts Council in 2009. She was awarded the Gattuso Prize for an outstanding featured solo exhibition It's all a blur in the CONTACT Photography Festival in 2017. Brewster is also a recipient of the Artist Prize from the Toronto Friends of the Visual Arts (2018).

== Collections ==
Her work is included in the collection of the Museum of Fine Arts Houston.
