= Kenth Öhman =

Swedish sprinter

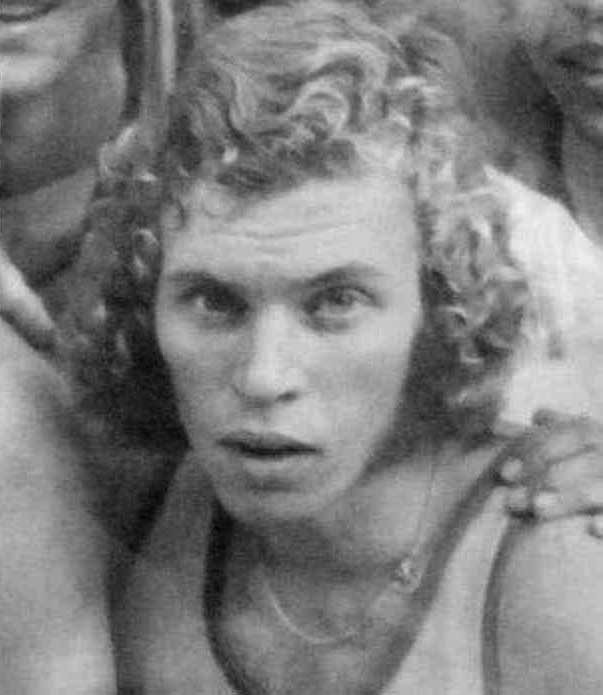

Personal information
- Nationality: Swedish
- Born: 18 April 1950 (age 76) Svinnegarn, Sweden
- Height: 180 cm (5 ft 11 in)
- Weight: 72 kg (159 lb)

Sport
- Sport: Sprinting
- Event(s): 400 m, 400 m hurdles
- Club: Enköpings AIF

Achievements and titles
- Personal best(s): 400 m – 46.9 (1972); 400 mH – 51.92 (1971)

Kenth Bertil Öhman (born 18 April 1950) is a Swedish sprinter. He was part of the Swedish team that finished seventh in the 4 × 400 metres relay at the 1972 Summer Olympics.
