= Omar Ba =

Senegalese sprinter

Personal information
- Nationality: Senegalese
- Born: 3 December 1949 (age 76)

Sport
- Sport: Sprinting
- Event: 4 × 400 metres relay

Omar Ba (born 3 December 1949) is a Senegalese sprinter. He competed in the men's 4 × 400 metres relay at the 1972 Summer Olympics.
