= Julia Dault =

Canadian artist

- Born: 1977 (age 48–49); Toronto, Ontario, Canada
- Education: McGill University, Parsons, the New School for Design

Julia Dault (born 1977) is a Canadian artist. She is best known for her abstract paintings and Formica and Plexiglas sculptures. She lives and works in Toronto.

== Early life and education ==
Dault was born in Toronto to Gary Michael Dault, an art critic, and Margaret Crawford, who is an art teacher. She attended McGill University, Montreal, and received a BA in Art History in 2001. After having worked as an art critic for The National Post and other publications, she attended Parsons, the New School for Design, New York, and received MFA in Fine Arts in 2008.

== Work ==
Sculpture

Dault has been making sculptures that are all called Untitled with a number since she made Untitled No.1 in 2008 for her thesis show for Parsons. Untitled sculptures are made with industrial materials, such as Formica and Plexiglas, and they are built without glue or screws. Sculptures are fabricated strictly on site without any pretreatment of materials. Each of them is also titled with a date and time stamp to reflect the amount of time it took for Dault to construct the sculpture. The stamp also reflects new iteration in case of reinstallation.

Painting

The use of various hand tools and the idea of removal is fundamental in Dault's paintings. She often paints layers of patterns and then scrapes the top monochrome layer to reveal the patterns underneath. Scraping is done with unique tools, such as door handles, combs created from a sheet of rubber, and plaster tools for home decoration.

== Exhibitions ==
Dault has had solo exhibitions internationally at Contemporary Art Gallery, Vancouver, Canada (2015); Marianne Boesky Gallery, New York (2015); China Art Objects Galleries, Los Angeles, CA (2014); Galerie Bob van Orsouw Zurich, Switzerland (2013); White Cube Bermondsey, London, UK (2012).

Her work has also been included in group shows including Pérez Art Museum Miami, Miami (2013); Contemporary Arts Museum Houston, Houston, TX (2013); Museum of Modern Art, Warsaw, Poland (2013); New Museum, New York, NY (2012); The Museum of Public Fiction, Los Angeles, CA (2010); Contemporary Arts Center, New Orleans, LA.

== Honors and awards ==
- 2011 Milton & Sally Avery Fellow, The Millay Colony, Austerlitz, New York
- 2011 Travel Grant, Canada Council for the Arts, Ottawa, Canada

== Collections ==
- Art Gallery of Ontario, Toronto, Canada
- British Council, London, UK
- Museum of Modern Art, Warsaw, Warsaw, Poland
- Pérez Art Museum Miami, Miami, FL
- Saatchi Gallery, London, UK
- Solomon R. Guggenheim Museum, New York, NY
