= Jacques Carette =

French sprinter (born 1947)

Personal information
- Born: 1 March 1947 (age 79) Roubaix, France

Sport
- Sport: Track and field
Medal record
Representing France
Olympic Games
Bronze medal – third place	1972 Munich	4 × 400 m relay
European Championships
Gold medal – first place	1969 Athens	4 × 400 m relay
Summer Universiade
Bronze medal – third place	1970 Turin	400m
Bronze medal – third place	1970 Turin	4x400m relay

Jacques Carette (born 1 March 1947) is a former athlete from France who competed mainly in the 400 metres.

He competed for a France in the 1972 Summer Olympics held in Munich, Germany in the 4 × 400 metre relay where he won the bronze medal with his teammates Gilles Bertould, Daniel Velasques, and Francis Kerbiriou.
