= Ketema Benti =

Ethiopian sprinter

Personal information
- Nationality: Ethiopian
- Born: 9 May 1945 (age 81)

Sport
- Sport: Sprinting
- Event: 4 × 400 metres relay

Ketema Benti (born 9 May 1945) is an Ethiopian sprinter. He competed in the men's 4 × 400 metres relay at the 1972 Summer Olympics.
