= Sasha Huber =

Finnish contemporary artist

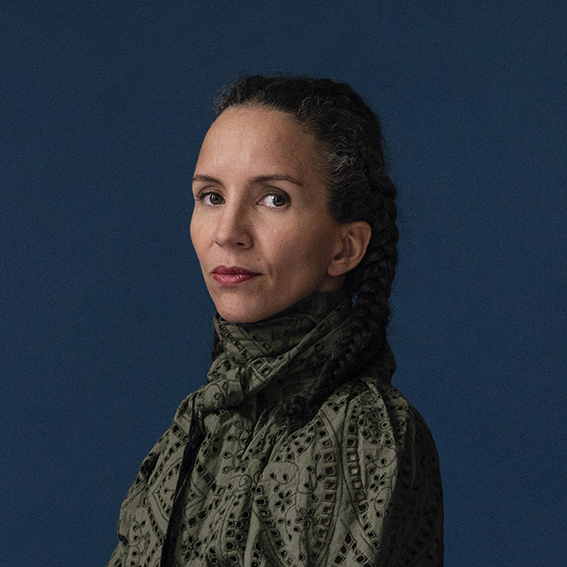
Sasha Huber

Sasha Huber (born 1975) is a contemporary artist living and working in Helsinki, Finland. Her work deals with colonial and post-colonial relationships negotiated by African and Caribbean diasporas. She uses photography, moving image, site specific performance, landscape, research and collaboration to explore individual and collective performances of colonial-era pseudo science, racial categorization, migration within the transatlantic slave trade, memorialization and transnational capitalism.

== Biography and education ==
Huber was born in 1975 in Zürich, Switzerland, to a Haitian mother and a Swiss father. Her maternal grandfather emigrated to New York in 1965 to escape the regime of the Haitian dictator François Duvalier. Seeking refuge from the regime, Huber's maternal grandfather migrated to New York City in 1965.

Huber graduated with a BA in graphic design from the Zurich University of the Arts and Vocational College for Art and Design Zurich. She moved to Finland to become partners with Petri Saarikko. In 2006, she completed an MA in Visual Culture from the University of Art and Design in Helsinki. Currently, she is a PhD candidate in Arts Research from Aalto University School of Arts, Design and Architecture in Helsinki. She lives in Helsinki with her husband and son, and travels internationally for artists' residencies and exhibitions.

== Exhibitions and collaborations ==
Huber began working with the Demounting Louis Agassiz, a collective that has demanded the renaming of the Agassiz peak in the Swiss Alps since 2007. Louis Agassiz was an American and Swiss scientist and professor who supported scientific racism and argued for Eurocentric racial categorizations of humans in the 19th century. The Demounting Louis Agassiz petition has collected over 2,500 signatures internationally to change the name of this peak to honour Renty, an enslaved man of Congolese descent who was photographed on a plantation in South Carolina as part of Agassiz's project. Huber continued her research into Agassiz with Brazilian historian Maria Helena Machado, publishing (T)races of Louis Agassiz: Photography, Body and Science, Yesterday and Today (2010) as part of an exhibition for the 29th Sao Paulo Art Biennial in 2010.

At the intersection of contemporary art, cultural geography and political activism, Huber's critique of the reproductive relationship between contemporary culture and historic oppression has been honored by leading culture-producing platforms within the contemporary art world, such as the Venice Biennial (2015), the San Paulo Biennial (2010). In addition, Huber's work has been acquired by the permanent collection of Kiasma, the Finnish Museum of Contemporary Art.
