= Félix Pérez (athlete) =

Venezuelan sprinter

Personal information
- Nationality: Venezuelan
- Born: 10 December 1951 (age 74)
- Height: 1.70 m (5 ft 7 in)
- Weight: 63 kg (139 lb)

Sport
- Sport: Sprinting
- Event: 4 × 400 metres relay

Félix Pérez (born 10 December 1951) is a retired Venezuelan sprinter. He competed in the men's 4 × 400 metres relay at the 1972 Summer Olympics.

== International competitions ==
Year	Competition	Venue	Position	Event	Notes
Representing Venezuela
1972	Olympic Games	Munich, West Germany	12th (h)	4 × 400 m relay	3:06.99

== Personal bests ==
- 400 metres – 47.5 (1973)
