= Francis Kerbiriou =

French athlete

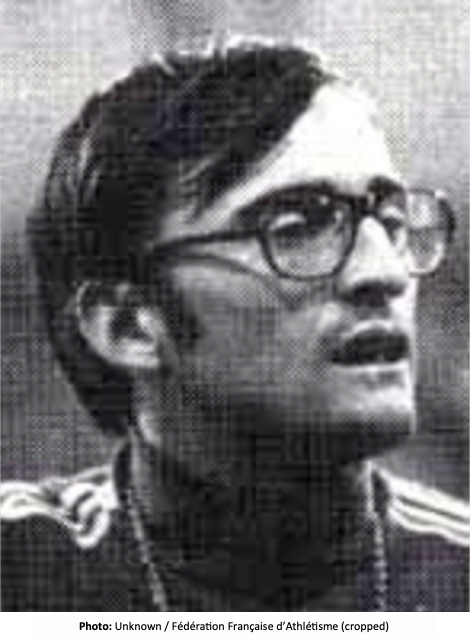
- Francis Kerbiriou (1972)

Personal information
- Nationality: French
- Born: 11 May 1951 (age 75) Rennes, France
- Height: 178 cm (5 ft 10 in)
- Weight: 68 kg (150 lb)

Sport
- Country: France
- Sport: Track and field
- Event: 400 meters
- Club: Stade Rennais

Achievements and titles
- Personal best: 46.01 (1972)
Medal record
Men's athletics
Representing France
Olympic Games
Bronze medal – third place	1972 Munich	4 × 400 m relay
European Indoor Championships
Gold medal – first place	1973 Rotterdam	4×340 m relay

Francis Kerbiriou (born 11 May 1951) is a former athlete from France who competed mainly in the 400 meters. He won the 1973 and 1975 French Athletics Championships in the 400 meters.

He competed for a France in the 1972 Summer Olympics held in Munich, Germany in the 4 × 400 metre relay where he won the bronze medal with his team mates Gilles Bertould, Daniel Velasques and Jacques Carette.
