= Christian Nicolau =

French sprinter (born 1947)

Personal information
- Born: 3 February 1947 (age 79) La Tronche, France

Sport
- Sport: Track and field
Medal record
Representing France
European Championships
Gold medal – first place	1969 Athens	4×400 m relay
Summer Universiade
Bronze medal – third place	1970 Turin	4x400m relay

Christian Nicolau (born 3 February 1947) is a French former athlete who competed in the 1968 Summer Olympics.
