= Martin Jellinghaus =

German athlete (born 1944)

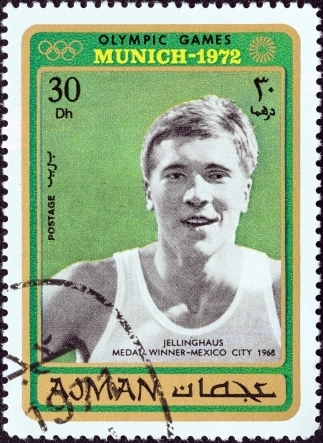

Personal information
- Born: 26 October 1944 (age 81) Lauf an der Pegnitz, Bayern, Germany
- Height: 1.87 m (6 ft 2 in)
- Weight: 83 kg (183 lb)

Sport
- Sport: Sprint running
- Club: Bayer Leverkusen
Medal record
Men's athletics
Representing West Germany
Olympic Games
Bronze medal – third place	1968 Mexico City	4×400 m
European Championships
Gold medal – first place	1971 Helsinki	4×400 m
Bronze medal – third place	1969 Athens	4×400 m
Summer Universiade
Silver medal – second place	1970 Turin	400m

Martin Jellinghaus (born 26 October 1944) is a retired West German former athlete who competed mainly in the 400 metres.

He competed for West Germany in the 1968 Summer Olympics held in Mexico City, Mexico in the 4 × 400 metre relay. He won the bronze medal with his teammates Helmar Müller, Manfred Kinder and Gerhard Hennige. During the games, along with the Australian sprinter Peter Norman, he wore Olympic Project for Human Rights badges to show support for the suspended American sprinters Tommie Smith and John Carlos, the two gold and bronze medalists in the men's 200-meter race, who took their places on the podium for the medal ceremony barefooted and wearing civil rights badges, lowering their heads and each defiantly raising a black-gloved fist as The Star-Spangled Banner was played.

Jellinghaus was a dentist by profession and served as town councillor in his native Lauf an der Pegnitz, 1984–1994.

Records
Preceded by (West Germany) Carl Kaufmann	European Record Holder Men's 400 m 17 October 1968 – 20 July 1972	Succeeded by (West Germany) Karl Honz
