= Gilles Bertould =

French sprinter (born 1949)

Personal information
- Born: 16 May 1949 (age 77) Plumaudan, France

Sport
- Sport: Track and field
Medal record
Representing France
Olympic Games
Bronze medal – third place	1972 Munich	4×400 m relay
European Championships
Gold medal – first place	1969 Athens	4×400 m relay
European Indoor Championships
Bronze medal – third place	1972 Grenoble	4×360 m relay
Summer Universiade
Bronze medal – third place	1970 Turin	4x400m relay

Gilles Bertould (born 16 May 1949) is a former French athlete who competed mainly in the 400 metres.

He competed for France in the 1972 Summer Olympics held in Munich, Germany in the 4 × 400 metre relay where he won the bronze medal with his teammates Daniel Velasques, Francis Kerbiriou, and Jacques Carette.

He continues to hold the French Junior record of 46.31, which he achieved at the Mexican Olympic Games.
