= Daniel Velasques =

French sprinter

Olympic medal record

Men's Athletics
Bronze medal – third place	1972 Munich	4x400 metre relay

Roger Daniel Velasques (born 11 December 1943) is a French athlete who competed mainly in the 400 metres.

He competed for France in the 1972 Summer Olympics held in Munich, Germany in the 4 x 400 metre relay where he won the bronze medal with his teammates Gilles Bertould, Francis Kerbiriou and Jacques Carette.
