= Sergio Bello =

Italian sprinter and hurdler

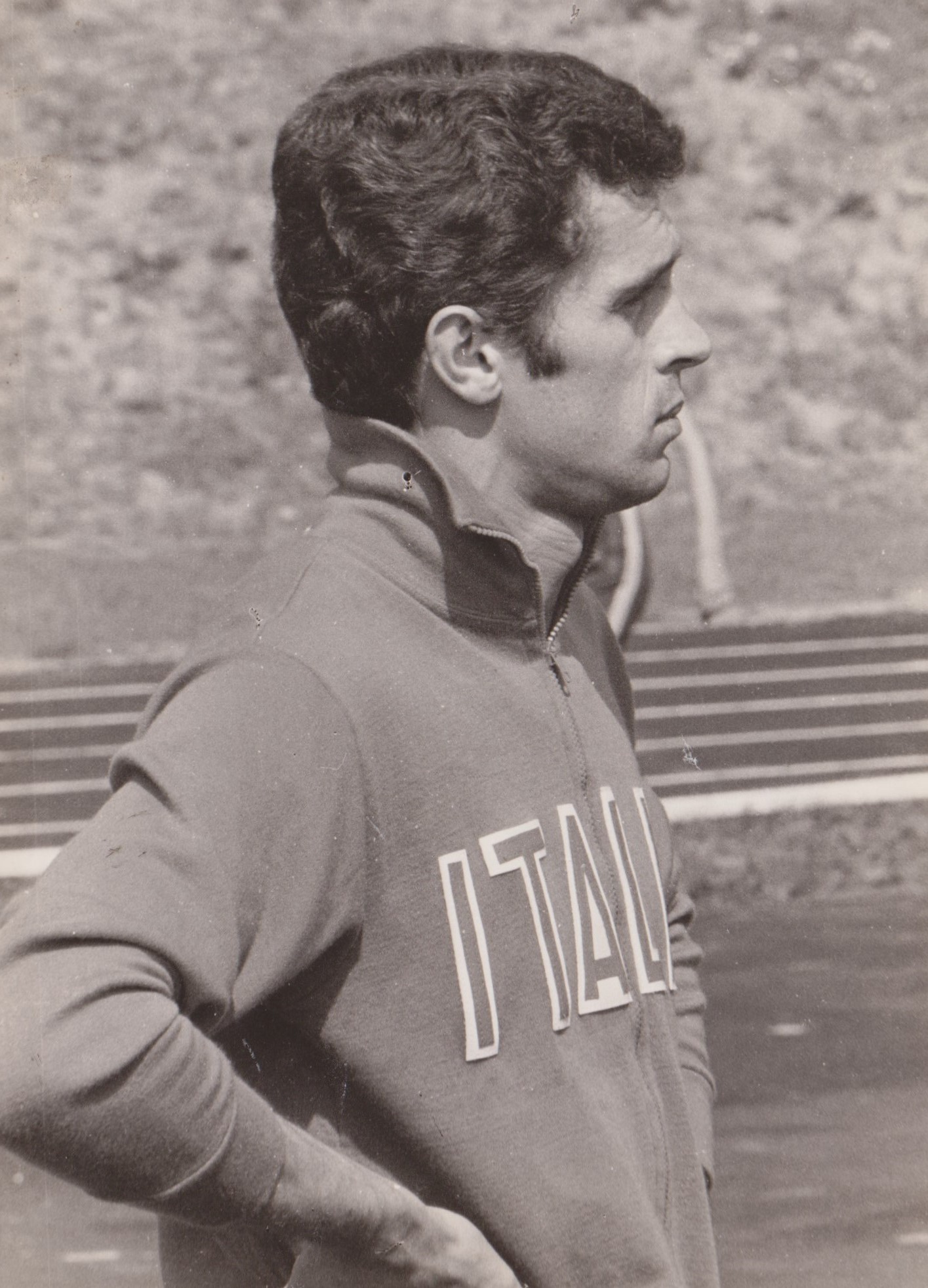

Personal information
- Nationality: Italian
- Born: 6 May 1942 (age 84) Intra, Italy
- Height: 1.78 m (5 ft 10 in)
- Weight: 70 kg (154 lb)

Sport
- Country: Italy
- Sport: Athletics
- Event: 400 metres
- Club: Snia Milan

Achievements and titles
- Personal best: 400 metres: 46"53 (1968)
Medal record
Men's athletics
Representing Italy
European Championships
Bronze medal – third place	1971 Helsinki	4×400 m
European Indoor Championships
Silver medal – second place	1966 Dortmund	Medley relay
Mediterranean Games
Gold medal – first place	1967 Tunis	400 m
Gold medal – first place	1967 Tunis	4×400 m
Gold medal – first place	1971 Izmir	4×400 m
Universiade
Gold medal – first place	1965 Budapest	400 m
Gold medal – first place	1965 Budapest	4×400 m
Bronze medal – third place	1963 Porto Alegre	4×400 m
Bronze medal – third place	1967 Tokyo	400 m

Sergio Bello (born 6 May 1942) is an Italian former sprinter, third with the 4 × 400 metres relay at the 1971 European Athletics Championships. He was born in Intra.

== Biography ==
Bello has 45 caps in Italy national athletics team (from 1961 to 1972). In his career, he participated in three editions of the Olympic Games and won the Italian Athletics Championships 6 times.

== Achievements ==
Year	Competition	Venue	Position	Event	Performance	Notes
1963	Universiade	(Brazil) Porto Alegre	3rd	4 × 400 m relay	3'13"8	
1965	Universiade	(Hungary) Budapest	1st	400 metres	46"8	
1965	Universiade	(Hungary) Budapest	1st	4 × 400 m relay	3'08"5	
1966	European Indoor Games	(West Germany) Dortmund	2nd	Medley relay	3'22"2	
1967	Mediterranean Games	(Tunisia) Tunis	1st	400 metres	47"7	
1967	Mediterranean Games	(Tunisia) Tunis	1st	4 × 400 m relay	3'12"6	
1967	Universiade	(Japan) Tokyo	3rd	400 metres	46"7	
1968	Olympic Games	Mexico City	7th	4 × 400 m relay	3'04"6	
1971	Mediterranean Games	(Turkey) İzmir	1st	4 × 400 m relay	3'07"5	
1971	European Championships	(Finland) Helsinki	3rd	4 × 400 m relay	3'04"60	

== National titles ==
- 5 wins in 400 metres at the Italian Athletics Championships (1965, 1966, 1967, 1968, 1969)
- 1 win in 400 metres hurdles at the Italian Athletics Championships (1970)

== See also ==
- Italy national athletics team - More caps
- Italy national relay team
