= Ulf Rönner =

Swedish sprinter (born 1946)

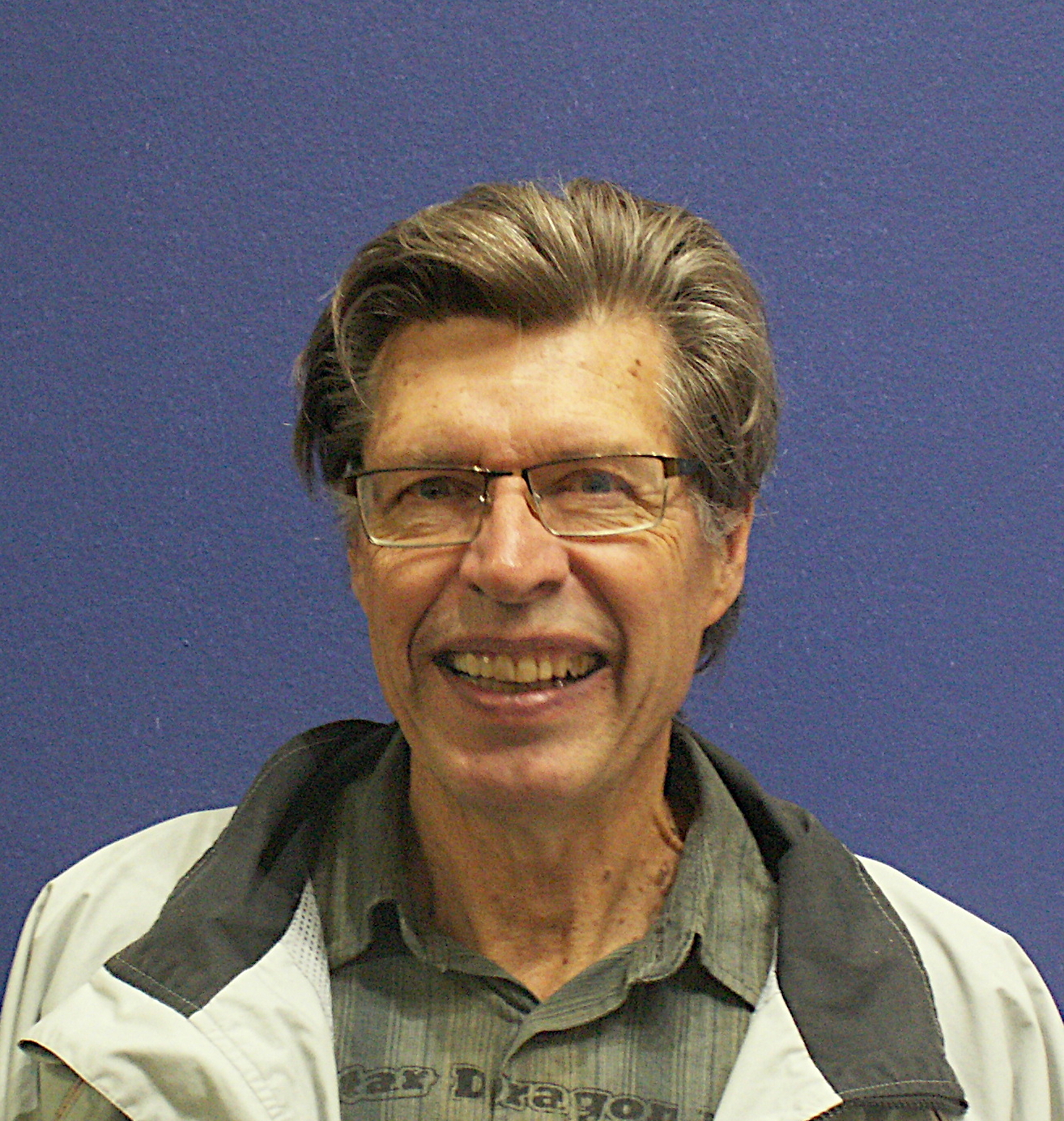
- Ulf Rönner in 2017

Personal information
- Nationality: Swedish
- Born: 3 October 1946 (age 79)

Sport
- Sport: Sprinting
- Event: 4 × 400 metres relay

Ulf Rönner (born 3 October 1946) is a Swedish sprinter. He competed in the men's 4 × 400 metres relay at the 1972 Summer Olympics. Domestically, he competed for the KA 2 IF club, Karlskrona.
