= Horst-Rüdiger Schlöske =

German sprinter (born 1946)

Medal record

Men's athletics

Representing West Germany

European Championships
Gold medal – first place	1971 Helsinki	4×400 m
Silver medal – second place	1974 Rome	4×400 m
Bronze medal – third place	1969 Athens	4×400 m

Horst-Rüdiger Schlöske, né Pfau (born 1 January 1946 in Berlin) is a former sprinter who specialized in the 400 metres. He represented West Germany.

== Achievements ==
Year	Tournament	Venue	Result	Extra
1969	European Championships	Athens, Greece	3rd	4 × 400 m relay
1971	European Championships	Helsinki, Finland	1st	4 × 400 m relay
1972	Olympic Games	Munich, West Germany	5th	400 m
1972	Olympic Games	Munich, West Germany	4th	4 × 400 m relay
1974	European Championships	Rome, Italy	2nd	4 × 400 m relay
