= Giacomo Puosi =

Italian sprinter

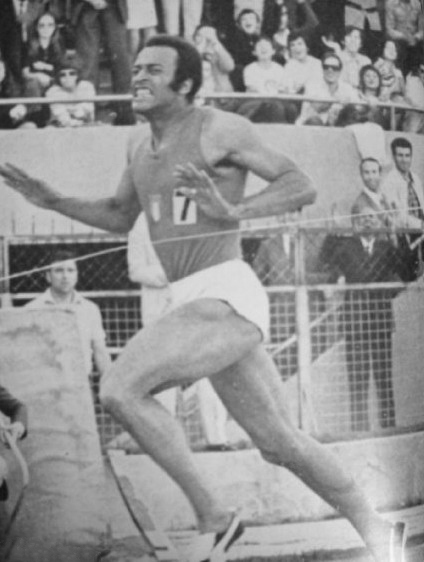
- Giacomo Puosi in 1972

Personal information
- Nationality: Italian
- Born: March 30, 1946 (age 80) Viareggio, Italy
- Height: 1.83 m (6 ft 0 in)
- Weight: 72 kg (159 lb)

Sport
- Country: Italy
- Sport: Athletics
- Event: Sprint

Achievements and titles
- Personal best: 400 m: 46.5 (1971)
Medal record
Men's athletics
Representing Italy
European Championships
Bronze medal – third place	1971 Helsinki	4x400 m
Mediterranean Games
Gold medal – first place	1967 Tunis	4x400 m

Giacomo Puosi (born 30 March 1946) is an Italian former sprinter who competed in the 1968 Summer Olympics and in the 1972 Summer Olympics.

== Biography ==
Giacomo Puosi (born 30 March 1946 in Viareggio, Lucca) is an Italian former sprinter who specialised in the 400 metres. During his career he was affiliated with FIAT Torino and set a personal best of 46.5 seconds over 400 m in 1971.

Puosi represented Italy at two Olympic Games. At the 1968 Summer Olympics in Mexico City he finished 7th in the final of the men's 4 × 400 metres relay, and at the 1972 Summer Olympics in Munich the Italian relay team was eliminated in the heats.

He also won medals in major international competitions, including a bronze in the 4 × 400 m relay at the 1971 European Athletics Championships in Helsinki, and gold medals in the 4 × 400 m relay at the 1967 Mediterranean Games in Tunis and the 1971 Mediterranean Games in İzmir, where he additionally took silver in the individual 400 m.

== National titles ==
- 1 win in 200 metres at the Italian Athletics Championships (1970)
- Winner of bronze medal in 4X400 metres event for European Athletics Championship (1971)

== See also ==
- Italy national relay team
