= Anders Faager =

Swedish sprinter (1945–2019)

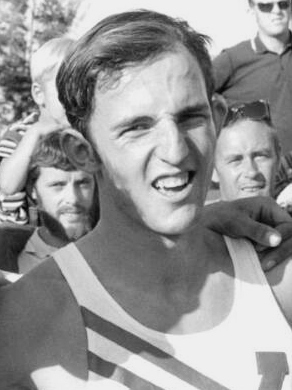
- Faager in 1969

Personal information
- Born: 3 April 1947 Nässjö, Sweden
- Died: 20 June 2019 (aged 72) Lund, Sweden
- Height: 186 cm (6 ft 1 in)
- Weight: 76 kg (168 lb)

Sport
- Sport: Athletics
- Event: Sprint
- Club: IK Sisu Nässjö; Wärnamo SK; KFUM Örebro

Achievements and titles
- Personal best(s): 100 m – 10.4; 200 m – 21.0; 400 m – 45.9 (1973)
Medal record
Representing Sweden
European Athletics Indoor Championships
Gold medal – first place	1974 Gothenburg	4 × 400 m relay

Sven Per Anders Faager (3 April 1945 – 20 June 2019) was a Swedish sprinter. He was part of 4 × 400 m relay teams that won a gold medal at the 1974 European Indoor Championships and placed seventh at the 1971 European Championships and 1972 Summer Olympics. Faager won both the 100 m and 200 m events at the national championships in 1969, 1970 and 1972. After retiring from competitions he served as administrative director of the Swedish Athletics Association.
