= Athletics at the 1974 British Commonwealth Games – Men's 400 metres hurdles =

Men's 400 metres hurdles at the 1974 British Commonwealth Games
- Venue: Queen Elizabeth II Park
- Dates: 27 and 29 January

Medalists
gold medal	Alan Pascoe	England
silver medal	Bruce Field	Australia
bronze medal	Bill Koskei	Kenya

The men's 400 metres hurdles event at the 1974 British Commonwealth Games was held on 27 and 29 January at the Queen Elizabeth II Park in Christchurch, New Zealand.

== Medallists ==
Medal winners
Gold	Silver	Bronze
Alan Pascoe; England	Bruce Field; Australia	Bill Koskei; Kenya

== Results ==
=== Heats ===
Held on 27 January

==== Qualification for semifinal ====
The first 5 in each heat (Q) and the next 1 fastest (q) qualified for the semifinals.

Heats results
Rank	Heat	Name	Nationality	Time	Notes
1	1	Fatwell Kimaiyo	Kenya	52.1	Q
2	1	Alan Pascoe	England	53.0	Q
3	1	Silver Ayoo	Uganda	53.2	Q
4	1	Gladstone Agbamu	Nigeria	53.9	Q
5	1	Wynford Leyshon	Wales	54.0	Q
	1	Sakaraia Tuva	Fiji	DNS	
1	2	Bruce Field	Australia	51.42	Q
2	2	Bill Hartley	England	52.5	Q
3	2	Colin O'Neill	Wales	52.6	Q
4	2	Bill Koskei	Kenya	52.7	Q
5	2	Rendell McIntosh	New Zealand	53.1	Q
6	2	Iroa Pamoa	Papua New Guinea	54.28	
1	3	Cosmas Silei	Kenya	51.7	Q
2	3	Gary Knoke	Australia	52.30	Q
3	3	Roger Johnson	New Zealand	52.9	Q
4	3	John Sherwood	England	52.87	Q
5	3	Berwyn Price	Wales	53.0	Q
6	3	Seru Gukilau	Fiji	53.0	q

=== Semifinals ===
Held on 27 January

==== Qualification for final ====
The first 4 in each semifinal (Q) qualified directly for the final.

Semifinal results
Rank	Heat	Name	Nationality	Time	Notes
1	1	Fatwell Kimaiyo	Kenya	49.8	Q
2	1	Bill Hartley	England	50.4	Q
3	1	Gary Knoke	Australia	50.60	Q
4	1	Colin O'Neill	Wales	52.3	Q
5	1	Roger Johnson	New Zealand	52.45	
6	1	Berwyn Price	Wales	52.80	
7	1	Seru Gukilau	Fiji	52.88	
8	1	Gladstone Agbamu	Nigeria	53.74	
1	2	Bruce Field	Australia	49.49	Q
2	2	Bill Koskei	Kenya	49.6	Q
3	2	Alan Pascoe	England	50.4	Q
4	2	Cosmas Silei	Kenya	50.7	Q
5	2	Silver Ayoo	Uganda	51.87	
6	2	Rendell McIntosh	New Zealand	51.95	
7	2	Wynford Leyshon	Wales	52.64	
	2	John Sherwood	England	DNS	

=== Final ===
Held on 29 January

Final result
Rank	Lane	Name	Nationality	Time	Notes
1st place, gold medalist(s)	8	Alan Pascoe	England	48.83	GR
2nd place, silver medalist(s)	5	Bruce Field	Australia	49.32	
3rd place, bronze medalist(s)	4	Bill Koskei	Kenya	49.34	
4	7	Fatwell Kimaiyo	Kenya	49.63	
5	1	Cosmas Silei	Kenya	50.02	
6	3	Bill Hartley	England	50.20	
7	6	Gary Knoke	Australia	50.23	
8	2	Colin O'Neill	Wales	50.58	
