= 1971 European Athletics Championships – Men's 400 metres hurdles =

Men's 400 metres hurdles at the European Athletics Championships

The men's 400 metres hurdles at the 1971 European Athletics Championships was held in Helsinki, Finland, at Helsinki Olympic Stadium on 10, 11, and 12 August 1971.

== Medalists ==
Gold	Jean-Claude Nallet; France
Silver	Christian Rudolph; East Germany
Bronze	Dmitriy Stukalov; Soviet Union

== Results ==
=== Final ===
12 August

Rank	Name	Nationality	Time	Notes
1st place, gold medalist(s)	Jean-Claude Nallet	France	49.15	CR
2nd place, silver medalist(s)	Christian Rudolph	East Germany	49.34	NR
3rd place, bronze medalist(s)	Dmitriy Stukalov	Soviet Union	50.04	
4	Dieter Büttner	West Germany	50.09	
5	Yevgeniy Gavrilenko	Soviet Union	50.51	
6	Ari Salin	Finland	50.57	
7	Vyacheslav Skomorokhov	Soviet Union	50.84	
8	Ivan Danis	Czechoslovakia	51.78	

=== Semi-finals ===
11 August

==== Semi-final 1 ====
Rank	Name	Nationality	Time	Notes
1	Yevgeniy Gavrilenko	Soviet Union	50.15	Q
2	Jean-Claude Nallet	France	50.35	Q
3	Vyacheslav Skomorokhov	Soviet Union	50.42	Q
4	Ivan Danis	Czechoslovakia	50.63	NR Q
5	Gerd Hennige	West Germany	50.87	
6	Jaakko Tuominen	Finland	51.13	
7	Giorgio Ballati	Italy	51.50	
8	Michel Montgermont	France	52.77	

==== Semi-final 2 ====
Rank	Name	Nationality	Time	Notes
1	Christian Rudolph	East Germany	49.82	Q
2	Dieter Büttner	West Germany	50.21	Q
3	Dmitriy Stukalov	Soviet Union	50.34	Q
4	Ari Salin	Finland	50.41	Q
5	Werner Reibert	West Germany	50.45	
6	Tadeusz Kulczycki	Poland	51.16	
7	Heinz Hofer	Switzerland	51.56	
8	Lucien Baggio	France	51.82	

=== Heats ===
10 August

==== Heat 1 ====
Rank	Name	Nationality	Time	Notes
1	Yevgeniy Gavrilenko	Soviet Union	50.79	Q
2	Heinz Hofer	Switzerland	51.08	Q
3	Ari Salin	Finland	51.28	Q
4	Lucien Baggio	France	51.29	Q
5	Zdzisław Serafin	Poland	51.53	
6	Kenth Öhman	Sweden	51.92	
7	Ladislav Kárský	Czechoslovakia	51.95	

==== Heat 2 ====
Rank	Name	Nationality	Time	Notes
1	Vyacheslav Skomorokhov	Soviet Union	50.48	Q
2	Dieter Büttner	West Germany	50.64	Q
3	Ivan Danis	Czechoslovakia	50.74	Q
4	Giorgio Ballati	Italy	51.07	Q
5	Jürgen Laser	East Germany	51.38	
6	Torsten Torstensson	Sweden	51.85	
7	Witold Banaszak	Poland	51.91	
8	John Sherwood	Great Britain	52.61	

==== Heat 3 ====
Rank	Name	Nationality	Time	Notes
1	Christian Rudolph	East Germany	50.48	Q
2	Werner Reibert	West Germany	51.04	Q
3	Tadeusz Kulczycki	Poland	51.11	Q
4	Michel Montgermont	France	51.40	Q
5	Francisco Suárez	Spain	51.77	
6	David Scharer	Great Britain	51.98	
7	Daniele Giovanardi	Italy	52.00	
8	Alberto Matos	Portugal	52.26	

==== Heat 4 ====
Rank	Name	Nationality	Time	Notes
1	Jean-Claude Nallet	France	50.69	Q
2	Dmitriy Stukalov	Soviet Union	50.78	Q
3	Jaakko Tuominen	Finland	51.21	Q
4	Gerd Hennige	West Germany	51.23	Q
5	Manuel Soriano	Spain	51.39	
6	Håkan Öberg	Sweden	51.72	
7	Ion Ratoi	Romania	52.10	
8	John Dillon	Ireland	58.42	

== Participation ==
According to an unofficial count, 31 athletes from 15 countries participated in the event.

- Czechoslovakia (2)
- East Germany (2)
- Finland (2)
- France (3)
- Ireland (1)
- Italy (2)
- Poland (3)
- Portugal (1)
- Romania (1)
- Soviet Union (3)
- Spain (2)
- Sweden (3)
- Switzerland (1)
- Great Britain (2)
- West Germany (3)
