= Athletics at the 1972 Summer Olympics – Men's 400 metres hurdles =

Men's 400 metres hurdles at the Games of the XX Olympiad
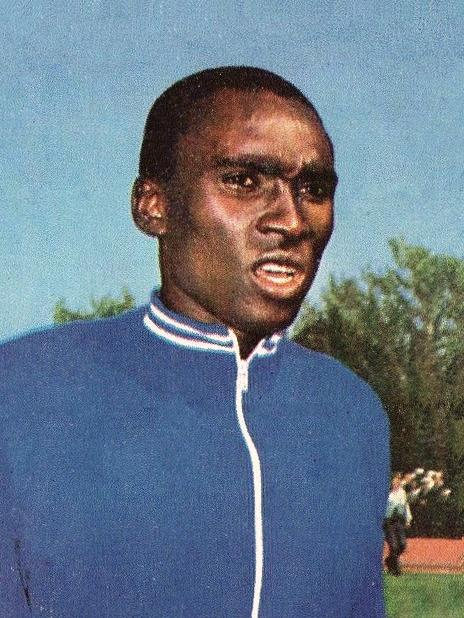
- John Akii-Bua
- Venue: Olympiastadion
- Dates: 31 August 1972 & 2 September 1972
- Competitors: 37 from 25 nations
- Winning time: 47.82 WR

Medalists
1st place, gold medalist(s)		John Akii-Bua; Uganda
2nd place, silver medalist(s)		Ralph Mann; United States
3rd place, bronze medalist(s)		David Hemery; Great Britain

The men's 400 metres hurdles was an event at the 1972 Summer Olympics in Munich. The competition was held on 31 August - 2 September. There were 37 competitors from 25 nations. The maximum number of athletes per nation had been set at 3 since the 1930 Olympic Congress. The event was won by John Akii-Bua of Uganda, the nation's first medal in the event and first gold medal in any Olympic event. Ralph Mann returned the United States to the podium after a one-Games absence with his silver medal, while David Hemery added a bronze to his 1968 gold to become the fifth man (and first non-American) to earn multiple medals in the event while extending Great Britain's podium streak in the 400 metres hurdles to three Games.

== Background ==
This was the 15th time the event was held. It had been introduced along with the men's 200 metres hurdles in 1900, with the 200 being dropped after 1904 and the 400 being held through 1908 before being left off the 1912 programme. However, when the Olympics returned in 1920 after World War I, the men's 400 metres hurdles was back and would continue to be contested at every Games thereafter.

Four of the eight finalists from the 1968 Games returned: gold medalist David Hemery and bronze medalist John Sherwood of Great Britain, seventh-place finisher Rainer Schubert of West Germany, and eighth-place finisher Roberto Frinolli of Italy. Hemery was one of the favorites, along with Ralph Mann of the United States, who had won the American championship from 1969 to 1971 as well as the U.S. trials. Uganda's John Akii-Bua had run the fastest time in 1971, but had little competitive experience.

Madagascar, Nigeria, and Spain each made their debut in the event; East Germany competed separately for the first time. The United States made its 15th appearance, the only nation to have competed at every edition of the event to that point.

== Competition format ==
The competition used the three-round format used every Games since 1908 (except the four-round competition in 1952): quarterfinals, semifinals, and a final. Ten sets of hurdles were set on the course. The hurdles were 3 feet (91.5 centimetres) tall and were placed 35 metres apart beginning 45 metres from the starting line, resulting in a 40 metres home stretch after the last hurdle. The 400 metres track was standard.

There were 5 quarterfinal heats with 7 or 8 athletes each. The top 3 men in each quarterfinal advanced to the semifinals, along with the next fastest hurdler overall. The 16 semifinalists were divided into 2 semifinals of 8 athletes each, with the top 4 in each semifinal advancing to the 8-man final.

== Records ==
Prior to the competition, the existing world and Olympic records were as follows.

World record	David Hemery (GBR)	48.1	Mexico City, Mexico	15 October 1968
Olympic record	David Hemery (GBR)	48.1	Mexico City, Mexico	15 October 1968

John Akii-Bua was the first to run the event in under 48 seconds, setting a new world record in the final with a time of 47.82 seconds.

== Schedule ==
All times are Central European Time (UTC+1)

Date	Time	Round
Thursday, 31 August 1972	10:00	Quarterfinals
Friday, 1 September 1972	14:30	Semifinals
Saturday, 2 September 1972	16:15	Final

== Results ==
=== Quarterfinals ===
The top three runners in each of the five heats (blue) and the next fastest (green), advanced to the semifinal round.

==== Quarterfinal 1 ====
Rank	Athlete	Nation	Time	Notes
1	Dieter Büttner	West Germany	49.78	Q
2	Viktor Savchenko	Soviet Union	49.90	Q
3	Jean-Pierre Corval	France	50.15	Q
4	Tadeusz Kulczycki	Poland	50.19	q
5	Manuel Soriano	Spain	50.88	
6	Fatwell Kimaiyo	Kenya	51.23	
7	Roberto Frinolli	Italy	51.69	
8	Jean-Aimé Randrianalijaona	Madagascar	52.75	

==== Quarterfinal 2 ====
Rank	Athlete	Nation	Time	Notes
1	David Hemery	Great Britain	49.72	Q
2	Gary Knoke	Australia	50.10	Q
3	Yuriy Zorin	Soviet Union	50.35	Q
4	Bill Koskei	Kenya	50.58	
5	Giorgio Ballati	Italy	50.90	
6	José Jacinto Hidalgo	Venezuela	54.00	
7	Norman Brinkworth	Pakistan	54.67	

==== Quarterfinal 3 ====
Rank	Athlete	Nation	Time	Notes
1	Christian Rudolph	East Germany	50.00	Q
2	Ralph Mann	United States	50.18	Q
3	Rainer Schubert	West Germany	50.23	Q
4	Ari Salin	Finland	50.45	
5	Jean-Pierre Perrinelle	France	51.81	
6	José Carvalho	Portugal	52.64	
7	Hassan Bergaoui	Tunisia	53.70	

==== Quarterfinal 4 ====
Rank	Athlete	Nation	Time	Notes
1	John Akii-Bua	Uganda	50.35	Q
2	Stavros Tziortzis	Greece	50.54	Q
3	Ivan Daniš	Czechoslovakia	50.62	Q
4	Bruce Field	Australia	51.46	
5	Hansjörg Wirz	Switzerland	52.34	
6	Dick Bruggeman	United States	54.36	
7	Julio Ferrer	Puerto Rico	54.83	
—	Francisco Rojas Soto	Paraguay	DNS	

==== Quarterfinal 5 ====
Rank	Athlete	Nation	Time	Notes
1	Yevgeny Gavrilenko	Soviet Union	49.73	Q
2	Jim Seymour	United States	49.81	Q
3	Rolf Ziegler	West Germany	50.17	Q
4	Roger Johnson	New Zealand	50.48	
5	Mike Murei	Kenya	51.63	
6	Lee Chung-Ping	Republic of China	52.61	
7	Gladstone Agbamu	Nigeria	53.68	
—	John Sherwood	Great Britain	DNF	

=== Semifinals ===
The top four in each of the two heats advanced to the final round.

==== Semifinal 1 ====
Rank	Athlete	Nation	Time	Notes
1	John Akii-Bua	Uganda	49.25	Q
2	Ralph Mann	United States	49.53	Q
3	David Hemery	Great Britain	49.66	Q
4	Rainer Schubert	West Germany	49.80	Q
5	Rolf Ziegler	West Germany	49.88	
6	Ivan Daniš	Czechoslovakia	50.01	
7	Viktor Savchenko	Soviet Union	50.28	
8	Jean-Pierre Corval	France	50.75	

==== Semifinal 2 ====
Rank	Athlete	Nation	Time	Notes
1	Jim Seymour	United States	49.33	Q
2	Yevgeny Gavrilenko	Soviet Union	49.34	Q
3	Yuriy Zorin	Soviet Union	49.60	Q
4	Stavros Tziortzis	Greece	50.06	Q
5	Tadeusz Kulczycki	Poland	50.80	
6	Gary Knoke	Australia	52.79	
—	Christian Rudolph	East Germany	DNF	
—	Dieter Büttner	West Germany	DNF	

=== Final ===
Rank	Lane	Athlete	Nation	Time	Notes
1st place, gold medalist(s)	1	John Akii-Bua	Uganda	47.82	WR
2nd place, silver medalist(s)	6	Ralph Mann	United States	48.51	
3rd place, bronze medalist(s)	5	David Hemery	Great Britain	48.52	
4	4	Jim Seymour	United States	48.64	
5	7	Rainer Schubert	West Germany	49.65	
6	2	Yevgeny Gavrilenko	Soviet Union	49.66	
6	8	Stavros Tziortzis	Greece	49.66	
8	3	Yuriy Zorin	Soviet Union	50.25	

== Results summary ==
Rank	Athlete	Nation	Quarterfinals	Semifinals	Final	Notes
1st place, gold medalist(s)	John Akii-Bua	Uganda	50.35	49.25	47.82	WR
2nd place, silver medalist(s)	Ralph Mann	United States	50.18	49.53	48.51	
3rd place, bronze medalist(s)	David Hemery	Great Britain	49.72	49.66	48.52	
4	Jim Seymour	United States	49.81	49.33	48.64	
5	Rainer Schubert	West Germany	50.23	49.80	49.65	
6	Yevgeny Gavrilenko	Soviet Union	49.73	49.34	49.66	
6	Stavros Tziortzis	Greece	50.54	50.06	49.66	
8	Yuriy Zorin	Soviet Union	50.35	49.60	50.25	
9	Rolf Ziegler	West Germany	50.17	49.88	Did not advance	
10	Ivan Daniš	Czechoslovakia	50.62	50.01	Did not advance	
11	Viktor Savchenko	Soviet Union	49.90	50.28	Did not advance	
12	Jean-Pierre Corval	France	50.15	50.75	Did not advance	
13	Tadeusz Kulczycki	Poland	50.19	50.80	Did not advance	
14	Gary Knoke	Australia	50.10	52.79	Did not advance	
15	Christian Rudolph	East Germany	50.00	DNF	Did not advance	
15	Dieter Büttner	West Germany	49.78	DNF	Did not advance	
17	Ari Salin	Finland	50.45	Did not advance		
18	Roger Johnson	New Zealand	50.48	Did not advance		
19	Bill Koskei	Kenya	50.58	Did not advance		
20	Manuel Soriano	Spain	50.88	Did not advance		
21	Giorgio Ballati	Italy	50.90	Did not advance		
22	Fatwell Kimaiyo	Kenya	51.23	Did not advance		
23	Bruce Field	Australia	51.46	Did not advance		
24	Mike Murei	Kenya	51.63	Did not advance		
25	Roberto Frinolli	Italy	51.69	Did not advance		
26	Jean-Pierre Perrinelle	France	51.81	Did not advance		
27	Hansjörg Wirz	Switzerland	52.34	Did not advance		
28	Lee Chung-Ping	Republic of China	52.61	Did not advance		
29	José Carvalho	Portugal	52.64	Did not advance		
30	Jean-Aimé Randrianalijaona	Madagascar	52.75	Did not advance		
31	Gladstone Agbamu	Nigeria	53.68	Did not advance		
32	Hassan Bergaoui	Tunisia	53.70	Did not advance		
33	José Jacinto Hidalgo	Venezuela	54.00	Did not advance		
34	Dick Bruggeman	United States	54.36	Did not advance		
35	Norman Brinkworth	Pakistan	54.67	Did not advance		
36	Julio Ferrer	Puerto Rico	54.83	Did not advance		
37	John Sherwood	Great Britain	DNF	Did not advance		
—	Francisco Rojas Soto	Paraguay	DNS	Did not advance		
