= Athletics at the 1970 British Commonwealth Games – Men's 400 metres hurdles =

Men's 400 metres hurdles at the 1970 British Commonwealth Games
- Venue: Meadowbank Stadium, Edinburgh
- Dates: 18, 21 and 21 July 1970

Medalists
gold medal	John Sherwood	England
silver medal	William Koskei	Uganda
bronze medal	Charles Kipkemboi Yego	Kenya

The men's 400 metres hurdles event at the 1970 British Commonwealth Games was held on 18, 20 and 21 July at the Meadowbank Stadium in Edinburgh, Scotland. It was the first time that the metric distance was contested at the Games, replacing the 440 yards hurdles.

== Medallists ==
Medallists
Gold	Silver	Bronze
John Sherwood; England	William Koskei; Uganda	Charles Kipkemboi Yego; Kenya

== Results ==
=== Heats ===
==== Qualification for semifinals ====
The first 4 in each heat (Q) and the next 4 fastest (q) qualified for the semifinals.

Heats results
Rank	Heat	Name	Nationality	Time	Notes
1	1	John Sherwood	England	51.6	Q
2	1	Charles Kipkemboi Yego	Kenya	51.8	Q
3	1	Roger Johnson	New Zealand	51.9	Q
4	1	William Taylor	Scotland	54.4	Q
5	1	Norman Brinkworth	Pakistan	55.3	
6	1	Henry Jackson	Jamaica	1:00.4	
	1	Rich McDonald	Canada	DNF	
1	2	John Akii-Bua	Uganda	51.8	Q
2	2	Bill Gairdner	Canada	52.3	Q
3	2	Gary Knoke	Australia	52.4	Q
4	2	David Scharer	England	52.5	Q
5	2	John Lewis	Wales	53.4	q
6	2	Tony Harper	Bermuda	53.6	q
7	2	Raymond Lweendo	Zambia	55.6	
8	2	John Kinahan	Northern Ireland	55.8	
1	3	William Koskei	Uganda	51.3	Q
2	3	Tony Collins	England	52.4	Q
3	3	James Grant	Jamaica	52.5	Q
4	3	Kingsley Agbabokha	Nigeria	53.1	Q
5	3	Andrew Webb	Scotland	53.5	q
6	3	Wilfred Kailema	Kenya	54.2	q
7	3	Brian Donnelly	Canada	54.5	
8	3	Roger Richardson	Wales	54.8	

=== Semifinals ===
==== Qualification for final ====
The first 4 in each semifinal (Q) qualified directly for the final.

Semifinals results
Rank	Heat	Name	Nationality	Time	Notes
1	1	John Sherwood	England	51.5	Q
2	1	John Akii-Bua	Uganda	51.9	Q
3	1	Kingsley Agbabokha	Nigeria	52.1	Q
4	1	Bill Gairdner	Canada	52.1	Q
5	1	James Grant	Jamaica	52.2	
6	1	William Taylor	Scotland	52.2	
7	1	John Lewis	Wales	52.4	
8	1	Wilfred Kailema	Kenya	54.6	
1	2	William Koskei	Uganda	51.3	Q
2	2	Charles Kipkemboi Yego	Kenya	51.7	Q
3	2	Gary Knoke	Australia	51.75	Q
4	2	David Scharer	England	51.9	Q
5	2	Roger Johnson	New Zealand	52.0	
6	2	Tony Collins	England	52.9	
7	2	Andrew Webb	Scotland	53.0	
8	2	Tony Harper	Bermuda	53.1	

=== Final ===
Final results
Rank	Lane	Name	Nationality	Time	Notes
1st place, gold medalist(s)	5	John Sherwood	England	50.03	
2nd place, silver medalist(s)	4	William Koskei	Uganda	50.15	
3rd place, bronze medalist(s)	2	Charles Kipkemboi Yego	Kenya	50.19	
4	7	John Akii-Bua	Uganda	51.1	
5	1	David Scharer	England	51.17	
6	5	Bill Gairdner	Canada	51.6	
7	8	Kingsley Agbabokha	Nigeria	51.6	
8	3	Gary Knoke	Australia	52.13	
