= 1973 USA Outdoor Track and Field Championships =

- Dates: June 15–17
- Host city: Bakersfield, California; Irvine, California; United States
- Venue: Memorial Stadium, Bakersfield College; Anteater Stadium, University of California, Irvine

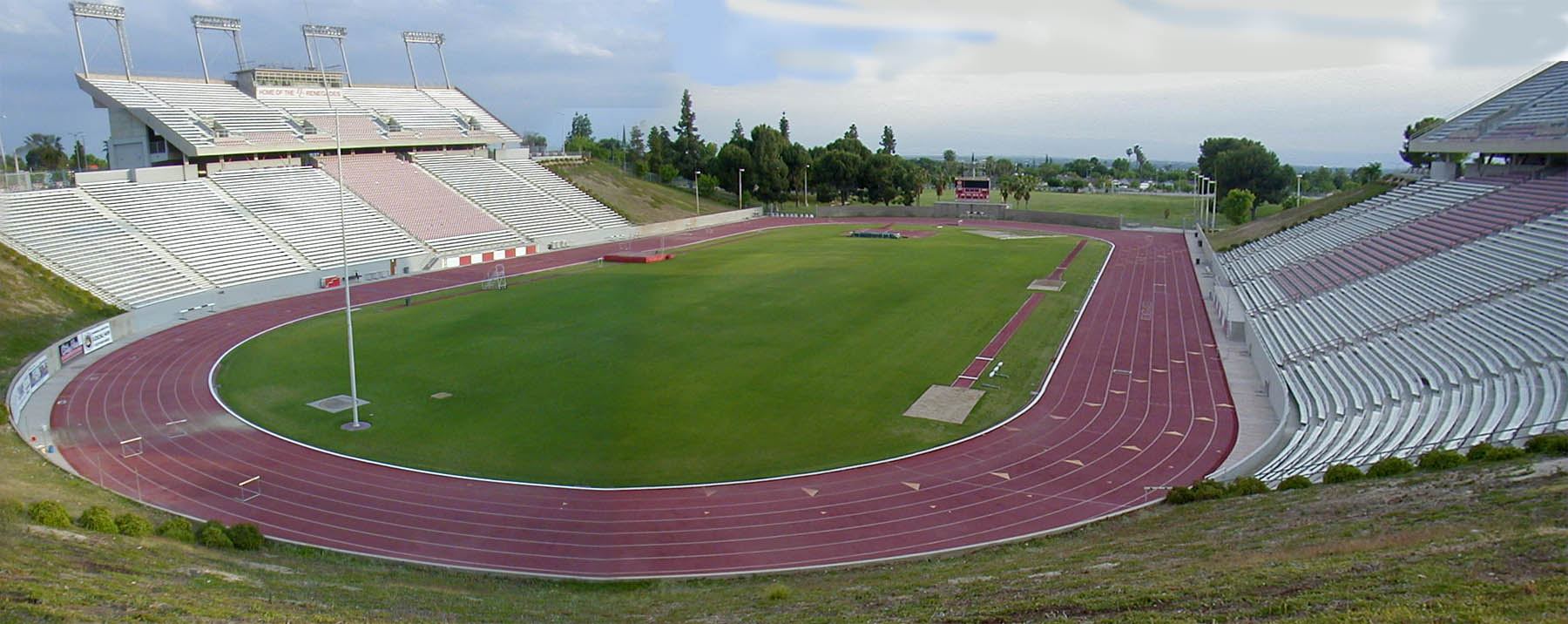
Bakersfield Memorial Stadium

The 1973 USA Outdoor Track and Field Championships men's competition took place between June 15–17 at Memorial Stadium on the campus of Bakersfield College in Bakersfield, California. This was Bakersfield's third and last time to host the men's division in a sequence every three years since 1967. At this time, Memorial Stadium still had a finely crushed brick surface, the last time the championships was held on a dirt track. They would host the women's division the following year, as they had in 1971. This was also the last time the men's division would compete at imperial distances (though the women would continue for another year). The women's division held their championships separately a little over a hundred fifty miles south at Anteater Stadium on the campus of University of California, Irvine in Irvine, California.

== Results ==
=== Men track events ===
| Event | Gold | | Silver | | Bronze | |
|---|---|---|---|---|---|---|
| 100 meters | Steve Williams | 9.4 | Herb Washington | 9.4 | Ivory Crockett | 9.4 |
| 220 yards | Steve Williams | 20.4 | Mark Lutz | 20.5 | Marshall Dill | 20.5 |
| 440 yards | Maurice Peoples | 45.2 | Carl Farmer | 45.8 | Benny Brown | 45.9 |
| 880 yards | Rick Wohlhuter | 1.45.6 CR | David Wottle | 1.46.2 | Skip Kent | 1.46.5 |
| 1 Mile | Leonard Hilton | 3.55.9 | Martin Liquori | 3.56.8 | Chuck LaBenz | 3.58.0 |
| 3 miles | Steve Prefontaine | 12.53.4 CRy | Richard Buerkle | 12.59.8 | John Hartnett; Ireland; Paul Geis | 13.06.4 13.09.2 |
| 6 miles | Gordon Minty; United Kingdom; Ted Castaneda | 27.20.8 27.22.4 | Jeff Galloway | 27.22.6 | Scott Bringhurst | 27.23.0 |
| Marathon held in San Mateo, California | Douglas Schmenk | 2.15.48 CR | John Vitale | 2.19.52 | Don Kennedy | 2.19.58 |
| 110 meters hurdles | Thomas Hill | 13.52 | Tommy Lee White | 13.70 | Charles Foster | 13.72 |
| 440 yard hurdles | Jim Bolding | 49.2 CRy | Ralph Mann | 49.6 | Robert Primeaux | 50.2 |
| 3000 m steeplechase | Douglas Brown | 8.26.8 | Barry Brown | 8.27.2 | Jim Johnson | 8.33.6 |
| 5000 meters racewalk | John Knifton | 21:36.4 | Ron Laird | 21:45.4 | Bill Ranney | 21:49.0 |

=== Men field events ===
| Event | Gold | | Silver | | Bronze | |
|---|---|---|---|---|---|---|
| High jump | Dwight Stones | 2.26 m (7 ft 4 3/4 in) MR | Tom Woods | 2.22 m (7 ft 3 1/4 in) | Chris Dunn | 2.18 m (7 ft 1 3/4 in) |
| Pole vault | Mike Cotton | 5.28 m (17 ft 3 3/4 in) | Vic Dias | 5.18 m (16 ft 11 3/4 in) | Robert Pullard; Ronald Mooers; Jonathan Vaughn; Frank Rock; Dave Hamer; Vince Struble; Terry Porter | 5.03 m (16 ft 6 in) |
| Long jump | Randy Williams | 7.95 m (26 ft 3/4 in) | Al Lanier | 7.90 m (25 ft 11 in) | James McAlister | 7.85 m (25 ft 9 in) |
| Triple jump | John Craft | 16.98 m (55 ft 8 1/2 in) MR | Barry McClure | 16.57 m (54 ft 4 1/4 in) | Milan Tiff | 16.45 m (53 ft 11 1/2 in) |
| Shot put | Al Feuerbach | 20.75 m (68 ft 3/4 in) | Ron Semkiw | 19.40 m (63 ft 7 3/4 in) | Samuel Walker | 19.30 m (63 ft 3 3/4 in) |
| Discus Throw | Mac Wilkins | 64.59 m (211 ft 10 in) | John Powell | 63.83 m (209 ft 4 in) | Tim Vollmer | 62.08 m (203 ft 8 in) |
| Hammer throw | Ted Bregar | 65.63 m (215 ft 3 in) | Albert Hall | 64.90 m (212 ft 11 in) | Steve DeAutremont | 64.90 m (212 ft 11 in) |
| Javelin throw | Cary Feldmann | 80.85 m (265 ft 3 in) | Fred Luke | 80.26 m (263 ft 3 in) | Bob Kouvolo | 79.93 m (262 ft 2 in) |
| All-around decathlon | Norm Cyprus | 6756 pts | | | | |
| Pentathlon | Rick Wanamaker | 3499 pts | | | | |
| Decathlon | Jeff Bennett | 8121 | Steve Gough | 7938 | Ron Evans | 7751 |

=== Women track events ===
| Event | Gold | | Silver | | Bronze | |
|---|---|---|---|---|---|---|
| 100 yards | Iris Davis | 10.3 | Martha Watson | 10.4 | Fran Sichting | 10.4 |
| 220 yards | Mable Fergerson | 23.4 | Fran Sichting | 23.5 | Jacqueline Thompson | 23.6 |
| 440 yards | Mable Fergerson | 54.1 | Marilyn Neufville; Jamaica; Kathy Hammond | 54.5 54.9 | Chris A'Harrah | 55.4 |
| 880 yards | Wendy Koenig | 2.04.7 CR | Mary Decker | 2.05.6 | Cheryl Toussaint | 2.06.7 |
| 1 Mile | Francie Larrieu | 4.40.4 CR | Kathy Gibbons | 4.40.5 | Eileen Claugus | 4.40.7 |
| 2 miles | Eileen Claugus | 10.19.4 | Kathy Gibbons | 10.33.0 | Tena Anex | 10.34.0 |
| 100 meters hurdles | Patricia Johnson | 12.9w | Debbie Lansky | 13.5w | Pat Donnelly | 13.8w |
| 400 meters hurdles | Gail Fitzgerald | 61.1 CR | Clydine Crowder | 61.9 | Janet Reusser | 63.0 |
| Mile walk | Esther Marquez | 7:54.6 NR | Sue Brodock | 7:59.0 | Cheryl Dotseth | 8:06.2 |

=== Women field events ===
| Event | Gold | | Silver | | Bronze | |
|---|---|---|---|---|---|---|
| High jump | DeAnne Wilson | 5 ft 9 in (1.75 m) | Audrey Reid; Jamaica; Karen Moller | 5 ft 8 in (1.72 m) 5 ft 8 in (1.72 m) | Pamela Blackburn; Joni Huntley | 5 ft 7 in (1.7 m) |
| Long jump | Martha Watson | 21 ft 4 3/4 in (6.52 m)w | Willye White | 20 ft 5 1/4 in (6.22 m)w | Jane Frederick | 20 ft 1 1/4 in (6.12 m)w |
| Shot put | Maren Seidler | 51 ft 8 1/4 in (15.75 m) | Denise Wood | 49 ft 0 3/4 in (14.95 m) | Jean Roberts; Australia; Jan Svendsen | 48 ft 11 3/4 in (14.92 m) 47 ft 4 3/4 in (14.44 m) |
| Discus Throw | Jean Roberts; Australia; Josephine de la Viña; Philippines; Monette Driscoll | 173 ft 3 in (52.8 m) 169 ft 9 in (51.73 m) 158 ft 10 in (48.41 m) | Joan Pavelich; Canada; Carol Frost | 157 ft 0 in (47.85 m) 156 ft 3 in (47.62 m) | Vivian Turner | 151 ft 7 in (46.2 m) |
| Javelin throw | Kathy Schmidt | 59.28 m (194 ft 5 in) | Barbara Friedrich | 56.77 m (186 ft 3 in) | Lynn Cannon | 52.09 m (170 ft 10 in) |
| Pentathlon | Jane Frederick | 4281 | Gail Fitzgerald | 4273 | Mitzi McMillin | 4109 |

== See also ==
- United States Olympic Trials (track and field)
