= 1970 USA Outdoor Track and Field Championships =

- Dates: June 26–28
- Host city: Bakersfield, California; Westwood, California; United States
- Venue: Memorial Stadium, Bakersfield College; Drake Stadium University of California, Los Angeles

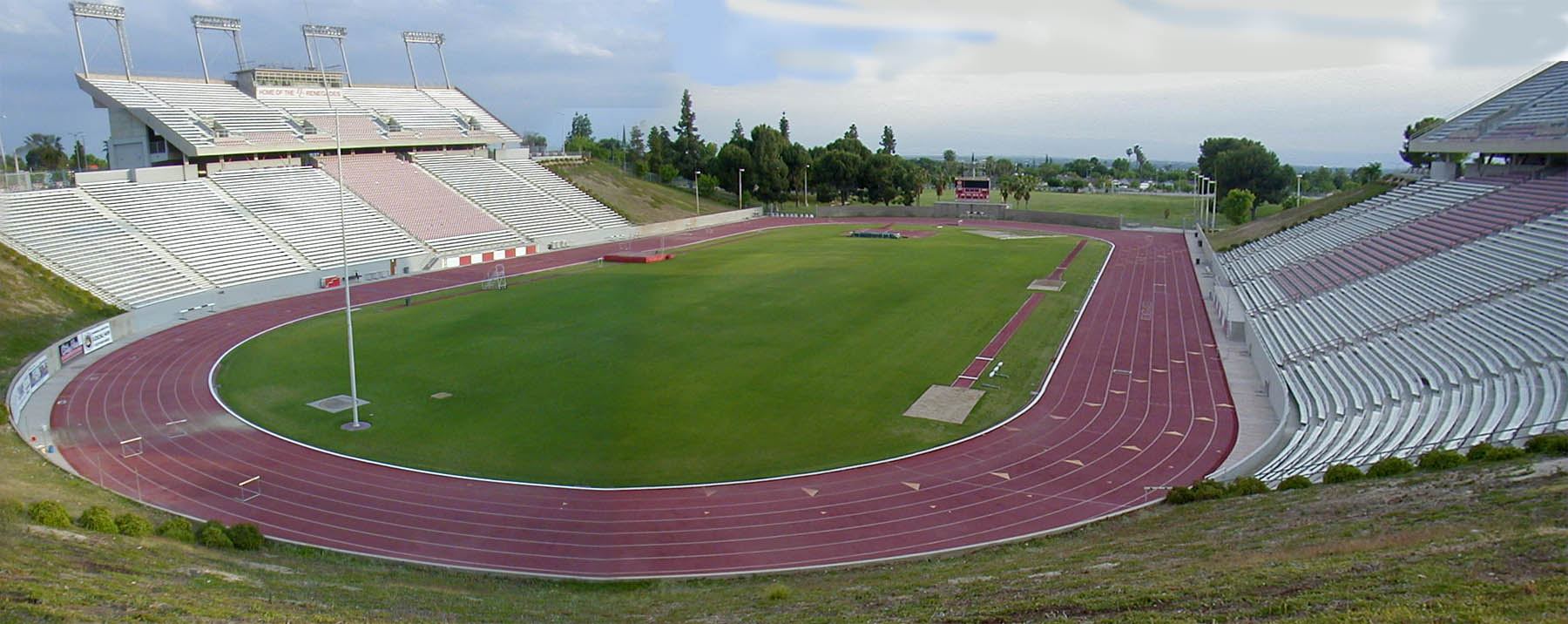
Bakersfield Memorial Stadium

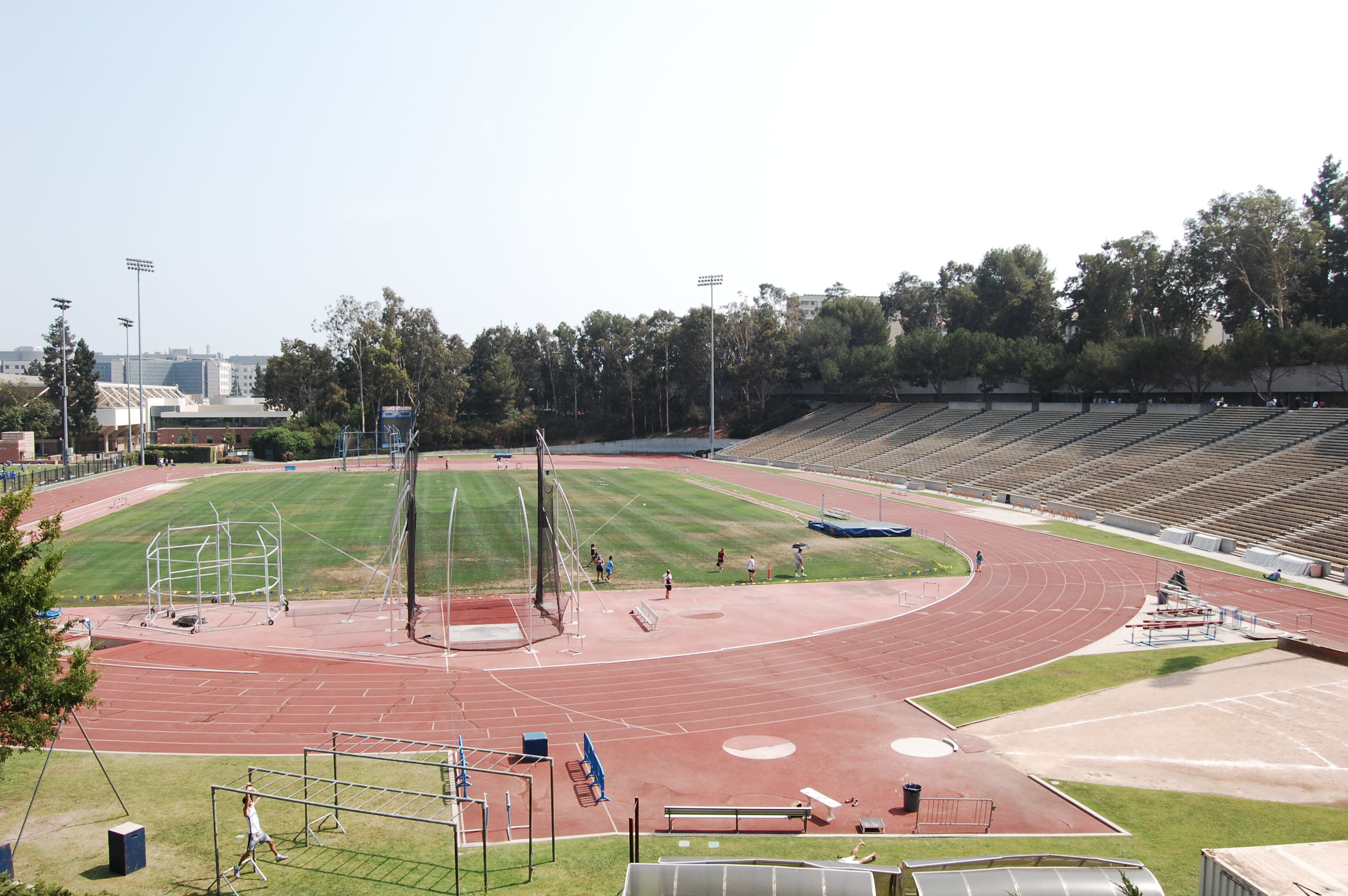
Drake Stadium

The 1970 USA Outdoor Track and Field Championships men's competition took place between June 26–28 at Memorial Stadium on the campus of Bakersfield College in Bakersfield, California. The women's division held their championships separately a little over a hundred miles south at Drake Stadium on the campus of University of California, Los Angeles in Westwood, California.

== Results ==
=== Men track events ===
Event	Gold		Silver		Bronze	
100 yards	Ivory Crockett	9.3	Ben Vaughan	9.3	Charles Greene	9.3
220 yards	Ben Vaughan	20.8	Willie Turner	20.8	Fred Newhouse	20.9
440 yards	John Smith	45.7	Lee Evans	45.7	Wayne Collett	45.8
880 yards	Ken Swenson	1.47.4	Mark Winzenried	1.47.4	Thomas Von Ruden	1.47.9
1 Mile	Howell Michael	4.01.8	Peter Kaal; South Africa; Martin Liquori	4.02.1 4.02.4	Jere Van Dyke	4.02.5
3 miles	Frank Shorter	13.24.2	Rick Riley	13.24.4	Gerry Lindgren	13.25.0
6 miles	Jack Bacheler	27.24.0	Frank Shorter	27.24.0	Garry Bjorklund	27.30.8
Marathon	Bob Fitts	2.24.10.6	Ronald Daws	2.29.44.6	Byron Lowry	2.33.43.6
120 yard hurdles	Thomas Hill	13.39	Marcus Walker	13.40	Willie Davenport	13.4
440 yard hurdles	Ralph Mann	49.8 MRy	Ron Whitney	50.2	Bob Steele	51.2
3000 meters steeplechase	Bill Reilly	8.34.8	Robert Price	8.36.4	Steve Savage	8.38.6
2 miles walk	Tom Dooley	13:44.0	Ron Daniel	14:14.8	Jim Hanley	14:21.8

=== Men field events ===
Event	Gold		Silver		Bronze	
High jump	Reynaldo Brown	2.16 m (7 ft 1 in)	Barry Shepard	2.13 m (6 ft 11 3/4 in)	John Dobroth	2.08 m (6 ft 9 3/4 in)
Pole vault	Bob Seagren	5.23 m (17 ft 1 3/4 in)	Paul Hegler	5.23 m (17 ft 1 3/4 in)	Sam Caruthers	5.08 m (16 ft 8 in)
Long jump	James (Bouncy) Moore	7.99 m (26 ft 2 1/2 in)w	Norm Tate	7.96 m (26 ft 1 1/4 in)w	Ron Coleman	7.95 m (26 ft 3/4 in) w
Triple jump	Milan Tiff	16.15 m (52 ft 11 3/4 in)	Dave Smith	16.08 m (52 ft 9 in)	Lennox Burgher; Jamaica; Dave Tucker	15.75 m (51 ft 8 in) 15.57 m (51 ft 3/4 in)
Shot put	Randy Matson	20.68 m (67 ft 10 in) MR	Steve Wilhelm	19.84 m (65 ft 1 in)	Al Feuerbach	19.81 m (64 ft 11 3/4 in)
Discus Throw	Jay Silvester	62.58 m (205 ft 3 in)	Rickard Drescher	58.90 m (193 ft 2 in)	John Powell	58.32 m (191 ft 4 in)
Hammer throw	George Frenn	70.10 m (229 ft 11 in)	Tom Gage	69.62 m (228 ft 4 in)	Harold Connolly	65.30 m (214 ft 2 in)
Javelin throw	Bill Skinner	84.30 m (276 ft 6 in)	Roger Collins	79.96 m (262 ft 4 in)	Frank Covelli	79.60 m (261 ft 1 in)
Pentathlon	Mike Hill	3316 pts				
All-around decathlon	Brian Murphy	7564 pts				
Decathlon	John Warkentin	8026	Russ Hodge	7886	Jeff Bennett	7750

=== Women track events ===
Event	Gold		Silver		Bronze	
100 yards	Chi Cheng; Taiwan; Iris Davis	10.2 10.4	Barbara Ferrell	10.4	Mattline Render	10.6
220 yards	Chi Cheng; Taiwan; Williomae Fergerson	22.4w 23.6w	Pamela Greene	23.7w	Esther Story	23.8w
440 yards	Mavis Laing	52.9	Jarvis Scott	53.4	Gwen Norman	53.5
880 yards	Cheryl Toussaint	2.05.1	Francie Kraker-Johnson	2.05.3	Terry Hull	2.05.5
1500 meters	Francie Larrieu	4.20.8	Doris Heritage	4.24.3	Trina Hosmer	4.29.2
3000 meters	Beth Bonner	9.48.1				
100 meters hurdles	Mamie Rallins	13.4	Patricia Johnson	13.5	Jan Glotzer	13.6
200 meters hurdles	Pat Hawkins	26.1	Patricia Johnson	26.7	Patrice Donnelly	27.3

=== Women field events ===
Event	Gold		Silver		Bronze	
High jump	Sally Plihal	1.73 m (5 ft 8 in)	Brenda Simpson	1.73 m (5 ft 8 in)	Toni Churchill	1.67 m (5 ft 5 1/2 in)
Long jump	Willye White	6.42 m (21 ft 3/4 in)	Martha Watson	6.11 m (20 ft 1/2 in)	Vicki Betts	6.03 m (19 ft 9 1/4 in)
Shot put	Lynn Graham	15.19 m (49 ft 10 in)	Maren Seidler	15.00 m (49 ft 2 1/2 in)	Lynette Matthews	14.90 m (48 ft 10 1/2 in)
Discus Throw	Carol Frost	52.50 m (172 ft 2 in)	Josephine de la Viña; Philippines; Linda Langford	48.56 m (159 ft 3 in) 48.31 m (158 ft 5 in)	Ranee Kletchka	48.05 m (157 ft 7 in)
Javelin throw	Sherry Calvert	56.31 m (184 ft 8 in)	Barbara Friedrich	53.06 m (174 ft 0 in)	Mary Boron	48.08 m (157 ft 8 in)
Pentathlon	Billie Pat Daniels	4735	Marilyn King	4542	Mavis Laing	4533

== See also ==
- United States Olympic Trials (track and field)
