= Athletics at the 1973 Summer Universiade – Men's 400 metres hurdles =

The men's 400 metres hurdles event at the 1973 Summer Universiade was held at the Central Lenin Stadium in Moscow on 18, 19 and 20 August.

== Medalists ==
Gold	Silver	Bronze
Dmitriy Stukalov; Soviet Union	Miroslav Kodejš; Czechoslovakia	Tadeusz Kulczycki; Poland

== Results ==
=== Heats ===
Rank	Heat	Athlete	Nationality	Time	Notes
1	1	Yanko Bratanov	Bulgaria	51.9	Q
2	1	Steve Black	Great Britain	52.2	Q
3	1	Julio Ferrer	Puerto Rico	53.1	
4	1	Albert Toro	Central African Republic	56.6	
5	1	Ahmed Javed	Pakistan	58.2	
1	2	Bruce Collins	United States	51.42	Q
2	2	Werner Reibert	West Germany	51.8	Q
3	2	Ladislav Kárský	Czechoslovakia	52.1	q
4	2	Luc Baggio	France	52.24	q
5	2	Enrique Aguirre	Mexico	53.9	
6	2	José Santiago	Puerto Rico	54.0	
1	3	Dmitriy Stukalov	Soviet Union	50.8	Q
2	3	Frank Nusse	Netherlands	52.1	Q
3	3	Roberto Maroldi	Italy	52.6	q
4	3	Wynford Leyshon	Great Britain	52.9	
5	3	Gheorghe Tanasescu	Romania	53.5	
1	4	Miroslav Kodejš	Czechoslovakia	51.4	Q
2	4	Jerzy Hewelt	Poland	52.2	Q
3	4	Daniele Giovanardi	Italy	52.5	q
4	4	Dorin Melinte	Romania	52.9	
5	4	Dorival Negrissoli	Brazil	53.4	
6	4	David Jarvis	Canada	53.6	
1	5	Tadeusz Kulczycki	Poland	51.7	Q
2	5	Hansjörg Haas	Switzerland	51.81	Q
3	5	Rolf Ziegler	West Germany	51.9	q
4	5	Talib Faizal Al-Saffar	Iraq	52.6	q
5	5	Ahmad Lotfabady	Iran	55.1	

=== Semifinals ===
Rank	Heat	Athlete	Nationality	Time	Notes
1	1	Miroslav Kodejš	Czechoslovakia	50.65	Q
2	1	Jerzy Hewelt	Poland	51.07	Q
3	1	Lucien Baggio	France	51.29	Q
4	1	Rolf Ziegler	West Germany	51.5	
5	1	Yanko Bratanov	Bulgaria	51.5	
6	1	Talib Faizal Al-Saffar	Iraq	53.0	
7	1	Roberto Maroldi	Italy	54.0	
	1	Bruce Collins	United States	?	
1	2	Tadeusz Kulczycki	Poland	50.70	Q
2	2	Dmitriy Stukalov	Soviet Union	50.70	Q
3	2	Frank Nusse	Netherlands	50.93	Q
4	2	Werner Reibert	West Germany	51.0	q
5	2	Ladislav Kárský	Czechoslovakia	51.5	q
6	2	Steve Black	Great Britain	51.8	
7	2	Hansjörg Haas	Switzerland	52.3	
8	2	Daniele Giovanardi	Italy	52.6	

=== Final ===
Rank	Athlete	Nationality	Time	Notes
1st place, gold medalist(s)	Dmitriy Stukalov	Soviet Union	49.62	
2nd place, silver medalist(s)	Miroslav Kodejš	Czechoslovakia	49.94	
3rd place, bronze medalist(s)	Tadeusz Kulczycki	Poland	50.54	
4	Jerzy Hewelt	Poland	50.93	
5	Lucien Baggio	France	50.98	
6	Frank Nusse	Netherlands	51.30	
7	Ladislav Kárský	Czechoslovakia	51.41	
8	Werner Reibert	West Germany	51.76	
