= Markku Kukkoaho =

Finnish sprinter (born 1946)

Personal information
- Born: 11 November 1946 (age 79) Puolanka, Finland
- Height: 189 cm (6 ft 2 in)
- Weight: 85 kg (187 lb)

Sport
- Sport: Athletics
- Club: Oulun Pyrintö; Puolangan Ryhti

Achievements and titles
- Personal bests: 200 m: 20.73/20.5h (1975); 300 m: 33.2h (1976); 400 m: 45.49 (1972)
Medal record
Men's athletics
Representing Finland
European Championships
Bronze medal – third place	1974 Rome	4×400 m

Markku Juhani Kukkoaho (born 11 November 1946) is a Finnish former sprinter. Kukkoaho placed fourth in men's 400 metres at the 1971 and 1974 European Championships and sixth at the 1972 Summer Olympics, where he set the still-standing Finnish national record of 45.49 seconds. He won bronze at the 1974 European Championships in the 4 × 400 metres relay as part of the Finnish team.

== Career ==
Kukkoaho won his first medals at the Finnish national championships (Kalevan kisat) in 1970, when he won the 400 metres in 46.5 and placed second in the 200 metres in 21.7. His best 400 m time that year was 46.1, which equaled Voitto Hellstén's national record from the 1956 Olympic semi-finals. In 1971 he was national champion in both events (20.8/46.9) and was selected for the 400 m and the 4 × 400 m relay for the 1971 European Championships in Helsinki. In the 400 m he set a new Finnish record, 45.74, but still finished just out of medals in fourth. The Finnish relay team was disqualified in the heats.

Kukkoaho won the national 400 m title again in 1972 (46.9) and was selected for the 1972 Summer Olympic Games in Munich, again for both the individual 400 m and the 4 × 400 m relay. In the individual race he qualified for the final, in which he placed sixth. His time in the final, 45.49, broke his own Finnish record; as of 2014, it still remains the national record, and only three other Finns have run under 46 seconds. In the relay the Finnish team of Stig Lönnqvist, Ari Salin, Ossi Karttunen and Kukkoaho ran 3:01.12, likewise placing sixth; that time also still remains the national record.

In 1974, Kukkoaho won the national 400 m title for a fourth and final time; his winning time that year was 45.8, which still remains the championship record. At that year's European Championships he again placed a close fourth in the individual 400 m, missing out on a medal by 0.06 seconds; in the relay, however, he got his first international medal. The Finnish team of Lönnqvist, Karttunen, Markku Taskinen and Kukkoaho ran 3:03.57 and placed a close third behind Great Britain and West Germany; Finland was briefly disqualified due to Kukkoaho shoving France's anchor Francis Demarthon, but after a successful Finnish protest the disqualification was overturned and the team regained its medals.

Kukkoaho won his final national individual title in 1976, winning the 200 m in his personal best time of 20.73; that spring, he ran the unusual distance of 300 metres in 33.2 for another still-standing national record. He returned to the Olympics in 1976 and the European Championships in 1978, but did not qualify for the finals.
