= Heinz Hofer =

Swiss hurdler

Heinz Hofer (born 18 April 1946) is a retired Swiss hurdler.

He competed at the 1971 European Championships without reaching the final. He became Swiss champion in 1970 and 1971. His personal best time was 50.47 seconds, achieved in July 1973 in Munich.
