= 1974 European Athletics Championships – Men's 4 × 400 metres relay =

Men's 4 × 400 metres relay at the European Athletics Championships

The men's 4 × 400 metres relay at the 1974 European Athletics Championships was held in Rome, Italy, at Stadio Olimpico on 7 and 8 September 1974. The third-placed Finnish team was initially disqualified over Markku Kukkoaho's use of his elbows at the start of the anchor leg, but Finland launched a successful counter-protest and kept the bronze medals.

== Medalists ==
Gold	Glen Cohen; Bill Hartley; Alan Pascoe; David Jenkins; Great Britain
Silver	Hermann Köhler; Horst-Rüdiger Schlöske; Karl Honz; Rolf Ziegler; West Germany
Bronze	Stig Lönnqvist; Ossi Karttunen; Markku Taskinen; Markku Kukkoaho; Finland

== Results ==
=== Final ===
8 September

Rank	Nation	Competitors	Time	Notes
1st place, gold medalist(s)	Great Britain	Glen Cohen; Bill Hartley; Alan Pascoe; David Jenkins	3:03.33	
2nd place, silver medalist(s)	West Germany	Hermann Köhler; Horst-Rüdiger Schlöske; Karl Honz; Rolf Ziegler	3:03.52	
3rd place, bronze medalist(s)	Finland	Stig Lönnqvist; Ossi Karttunen; Markku Taskinen; Markku Kukkoaho	3:03.57	
4	France	Jean-Claude Nallet; Roger Vélasquez; Jacques Carette; Francis Demarthon	3:04.6	
5	East Germany	Reinhard Kokot; Benno Stops; Jürgen Utikal; Andreas Scheibe	3:05.0	
6	Netherlands	Raymond Heerenveen; Rijn van den Heuvel; Frank Nusse; Toine van den Goolberg	3:06.3	NR
7	Sweden	Per-Olof Sjöberg; Dimitrie Grama; Erik Carlgren; Michael Fredriksson	3:12.6	
	Soviet Union	Valeriy Yurchenko; Vladimir Nosenko; Yevgeniy Gavrilenko; Semyon Kocher	DNF	

=== Heats ===
7 September

==== Heat 1 ====
Rank	Nation	Competitors	Time	Notes
1	Finland	Stig Lönnqvist; Ossi Karttunen; Markku Taskinen; Markku Kukkoaho	3:04.6	Q
2	Great Britain	Glen Cohen; Bill Hartley; Alan Pascoe; David Jenkins	3:04.7	Q
3	France	Jean-Claude Nallet; Roger Vélasquez; Jacques Carette; Francis Demarthon	3:05.3	Q
4	Netherlands	Raymond Heerenveen; Rijn van den Heuvel; Frank Nusse; Toine van den Goolberg	3:06.28	Q
5	Italy	Flavio Borghi; Alfonso di Guida; Lorenzo Cellerino; Marcello Fiasconaro	3:08.5	
6	Yugoslavia	Ivica Ivičak; Milorad Čikić; Josip Alebić; Luciano Sušanj	3:37.8	

==== Heat 2 ====
Rank	Nation	Competitors	Time	Notes
1	Soviet Union	Valeriy Yurchenko; Vladimir Nosenko; Yevgeniy Gavrilenko; Semyon Kocher	3:05.3	Q
2	Sweden	Per-Olof Sjöberg; Dimitrie Grama; Erik Carlgren; Michael Fredriksson	3:05.5	Q
3	East Germany	Reinhard Kokot; Benno Stops; Jürgen Utikal; Andreas Scheibe	3:05.8	Q
4	West Germany	Hermann Köhler; Horst-Rüdiger Schlöske; Karl Honz; Bernd Herrmann	3:05.8	Q
5	Czechoslovakia	Ivan Daniš; František Štross; Miroslav Tulis; Miroslav Kodejš	3:06.29	

== Participation ==
According to an unofficial count, 45 athletes from 11 countries participated in the event.

- Czechoslovakia (4)
- East Germany (4)
- Finland (4)
- France (4)
- Italy (4)
- Netherlands (4)
- Soviet Union (4)
- Sweden (4)
- Great Britain (4)
- West Germany (5)
- Yugoslavia (4)
