= Mike Cotton =

Mike Cotton may refer to:

- Mike Cotton (musician) (born 1939), English jazz and R&B musician, vocalist and bandleader
- Mike Cotton (pole vaulter) (born 1951), former American college and international track and field athlete
- Mike Cotton (runner) (born 1958), American long-distance runner, 1981 All-American for the Virginia Cavaliers track and field team

== See also ==
- Mike Cotten (born 1939), former American football player
