= Alan Pascoe =

British hurdler (born 1947)

Alan Pascoe MBE OLY
Personal information
- Nationality: British (English)
- Born: 11 October 1947 (age 78) Portsmouth, England
- Height: 185 cm (6 ft 1 in)
- Weight: 74 kg (163 lb)

Sport
- Sport: Athletics
- Event: hurdles
- Club: Portsmouth AC; Polytechnic Harriers
Medal record
Men's athletics
Representing Great Britain
Olympic Games
Silver medal – second place	1972 Munich	4×400 m
European Championships
Gold medal – first place	1974 Rome	400 m hurdles
Gold medal – first place	1974 Rome	4×400 m
Silver medal – second place	1971 Helsinki	110 m hurdles
Bronze medal – third place	1969 Athens	110 m hurdles
Representing England
Commonwealth Games
Gold medal – first place	1974 Christchurch	400 m hurdles
Silver medal – second place	1974 Christchurch	4×400 m
Bronze medal – third place	1978 Edmonton	400 m hurdles

Alan Peter Pascoe (born 11 October 1947) is a British former athlete who gained success in hurdles and competed at three Olympic Games. After his athletics career, he has been successful in events marketing and consulting.

== Early life and education ==
Pascoe was born in Portsmouth, and lived in the Paulsgrove area of the city. He was educated at Portsmouth Southern Grammar School for Boys. He undertook higher education at Borough Road College, Isleworth, where he received a Certificate in Education, and the University of London, where he received an Honours degree in Education. He married sprinter Della James (1949–2023) in 1970. The couple had one son and one daughter.

== Achievements as a competitor ==
=== Medals ===
Pascoe won medals in the Olympic Games, the European Championships, and the Commonwealth Games., also the European Indoor Games.

After the 1974 Commonwealth Games victory Pascoe achieved a major distinction, in celebration he performed one of the great televised sporting bloopers. While doing his victory lap in reverse, Pascoe attempted to leap the last hurdle still remaining from the race and badly missed the hurdle, falling onto his back and denting the hurdle. Trying to regain his dignity, he circled around to attempt the jump the hurdle in another lane and fell identically. Laughing it off, he got up again and started turning over the other hurdles. See the video on YouTube. In winning the race he also achieved the minor distinction of running the seventh fastest 400-metre hurdle time, third fastest time by a British athlete, to that date (behind Jim Seymour, Ralph Mann, David Hemery and the then world record holder John Akii-Bua) at 48.8, despite running in the outside lane.

Pascoe was a five-times British 110 metres hurdles champion after winning the British AAA Championships titles at the 1968 AAA Championships, 1971 AAA Championships and 1972 AAA Championships and being the highest placed British athlete at the 1967 AAA Championships and 1969 AAA Championships.

Olympics:

- Silver, 4 × 400 m Relay, 1972

European Athletics Championships:

- Bronze, 110 m Hurdles, 1969
- Silver, 110 m Hurdles, 1971
- Gold, 400 m Hurdles, 1974
- Gold, 4 × 400 m Relay, 1974

Commonwealth Games:

- Gold, 400 m Hurdles, 1974
- Silver, 4 × 400 m Relay, 1974
- Bronze, 400 m Hurdles, 1978

European Indoor Games:

- Gold, 50 m Hurdles, 1969

=== Personal bests ===
Pascoe's personal best times are:

- 200 m, 15 July 1972, London, 20.92
- 110 m Hurdles, 17 June 1972, Edinburgh, 13.79
- 400 m Hurdles, 30 June 1975, Stockholm, 48.59

== Career outside competitive athletics ==
Pascoe competed in athletics at a time when it was supposed to be an amateur activity. He thus needed paid employment during his athletics career. He was a teacher at Dulwich College (1971–1974), and a lecturer in physical education at Borough Road College, Isleworth (1974–1980).

Pascoe was also able to get financial support during the 1970s from membership of several QUANGOs; the Sports Council (1974–1980), the Minister for Sports' Working Party on Centres of Sporting Excellence (1975–1979), and the BBC Advisory Council (1975–1979).

After competitive athletics, Pascoe became involved in events marketing and consulting. He set up Alan Pascoe Associates Ltd. (later named API), of which he was Director (1976–1983), managing director (1983), Chairman (1985–1988) and CEO (1994–1998). Pascoe sold API in 1998, then started another company, Fast Track Events Ltd., of which he is the chairman.

Pascoe was a summarizer with main commentator Adrian Metcalfe of ITV coverage of athletics during the mid/late 1970s and early 1980s.

Other business appointments were as a Director of the Aegis Group (later named WCRS) (1986–1992) and Chairman of Carat Sponsorship (1987–1992).

Pascoe criticised the British government for withdrawing from hosting the World Athletics Championships in 2001. He claimed that the Prime Minister, Tony Blair, had broken a written undertaking to host the games. Pascoe believed that the decision amounted to the sport being cold-bloodedly "stabbed in the back". He believed that Blair had damaged Britain, by making the nation look foolish, and by causing the loss of both GBP 15–20 million in revenue, and a stadium suitable for top-class athletics. Such a stadium, he believed, was essential for developing home talent into world-class athletes.

In September 2003, Pascoe was appointed vice-chairman of the London bid for the 2012 Summer Olympics, which was ultimately successful.

== Honours ==
Pascoe was appointed a Member of the Order of the British Empire (MBE) in the 1975 New Year Honours for services to athletics, and received an honorary doctorate from Brunel University in 1997.

== See also ==
- Olympic medalists in athletics (men)
- Great Britain and Northern Ireland at the 1972 Summer Olympics
- Great Britain and Northern Ireland at the 1976 Summer Olympics
- 1969 European Championships in Athletics
- 1971 European Championships in Athletics
- 1974 European Championships in Athletics
- 1974 British Commonwealth Games
- 1978 Commonwealth Games
