= Jim Seymour (hurdler) =

American track and field athlete

James Michael Seymour (born July 27, 1949, in Fresno, California) is a retired American track and field athlete. He was a silver medalist in the 400 metres hurdles at the 1971 Pan American Games behind Ralph Mann. He also represented the US at the 1972 Olympics where he finished in fourth place, about a meter behind the silver and bronze medalists Ralph Mann and David Hemery and more than a second faster than the 5th, 6th and 7th placers Rainer Schubert, Yevgeny Gavrilenko and Stavros Tziortzis, but about 6 meters behind gold medalist John Akii-Bua's world record. Seymour ran for the University of Washington, finishing fourth in the 1971 NCAA Championships, then third at the 1971 National Championships. After college he ran for the Southern California Striders.
