= Tony Collins =

Tony Collins may refer to:

- Tony Collins (American football) (born 1959), American football player with the New England Patriots and Miami Dolphins
- Tony Collins (footballer) (1926–2021), English football player, manager and scout
- Tony Collins (historian) (born 1961), British social historian
- Tony Collins (hurdler) (born 1949), English hurdler

== See also ==
- Toni Collins or Antonietta Collins (born 1991), Mexican-American sportscaster
- Anthony Collins (disambiguation)
- Antony Collins (disambiguation)
