= 1972 USA Outdoor Track and Field Championships =

- Dates: June 16–18
- Host city: Seattle, Washington; Canton, Ohio, United States
- Venue: Husky Stadium; Citizens Field

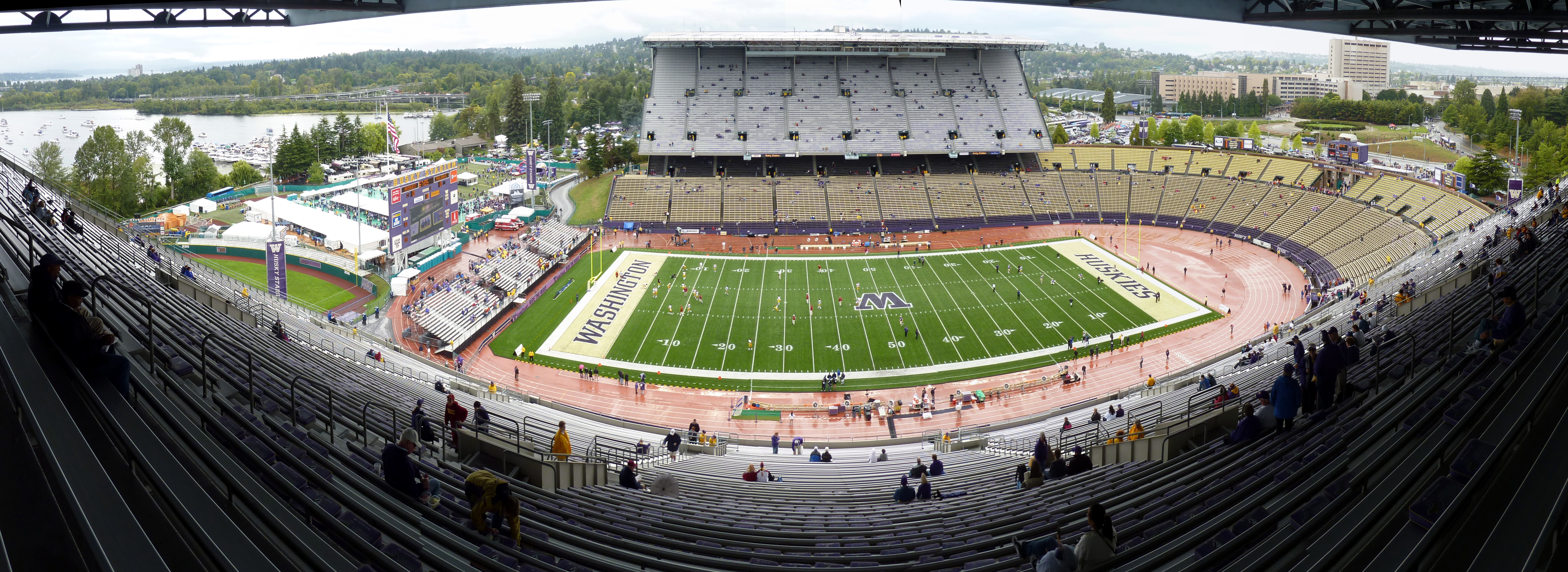
Husky Stadium

The Men's 1972 USA Outdoor Track and Field Championships took place between June 16–18 at Husky Stadium on the campus of University of Washington in Seattle, Washington. It is the only time this championship has been held in the state of Washington. The Women's Championships took place at Citizens Field in Canton, Ohio. The meet was organized by the Amateur Athletic Union.

== Results ==
=== Men track events ===
Event	Gold		Silver		Bronze	
100 meters	Robert Taylor	10.2	Delano Meriwether	10.3	Herb Washington	10.3
200 meters	Chuck Smith	20.7	David Jenkins; United Kingdom; Al Hearvey	20.8 21.1	Dennis Walker	21.1
400 meters	Lee Evans	45.0	Vince Matthews	45.1	Fred Newhouse	45.3
800 meters	David Wottle	1.47.3	Rick Wohlhuter	1.47.5	Rick Brown	1.47.6
1500 meters	Jerome Howe	3.38.2	Howell Michael	3.38.3	Bob Maplestone; Wales; Bruce Fischer	3.39.7 3.40.0
5000 meters	Mike Keogh; Ireland; Richard Buerkle	13.51.8 13.54.8	Peter Duffy; Ireland; Jay Mason	13.55.8 13.56.2	Jim Johnson	13.59.8
10000 meters	Gregory Fredericks	28.08.0 NR	Frank Shorter	28.12.0	Tom Laris	28.12.6
Marathon	Edmund Norris	2.24.42.8	John Vitale	2.25.30.0	Bob Fitts	2.26.23.0
110 meters hurdles	Rod Milburn	13.4 =CRm	Willie Davenport	13.6	Thomas Hill	13.6
400 meters hurdles	Dick Bruggeman	50.0	Jim Bolding	50.0	Bob Cassleman	50.3
3000 meters steeplechase	Jim Dare	8.33.8	Steve Savage	8.34.8	Cliff Clark	8.36.4
5000 meters racewalk	Larry Young	21:39.8	Bill Ranney	22:29.8	Todd Skully	22:33.8

=== Men field events ===
Event	Gold		Silver		Bronze	
High jump	Barry Schur	2.18 m (7 ft 1 3/4 in)	Gene White	2.18 m (7 ft 1 3/4 in)	Dennis Adama; Ron Jourdan	2.13 m (6 ft 11 3/4 in)
Pole vault	Dave Roberts	5.49 m (18 ft 0 in)CR	Jack Ernst	5.18 m (16 ft 11 3/4 in)	Buddy Williamson	5.18 m (16 ft 11 3/4 in)
Long jump	Arnie Robinson	8.07 m (26 ft 5 1/2 in)	Jacques Pani; France; James McAlister	8.02 m (26 ft 3 1/2 in)w 7.61 m (24 ft 11 1/2 in)	Ron Coleman	7.56 m (24 ft 9 1/2 in)w
Triple jump	John Craft	16.71 m (54 ft 9 3/4 in)w	Art Walker	16.45 m (53 ft 11 1/2 in)	Milan Tiff	16.31 m (53 ft 6 in)w
Shot put	Randy Matson	21.19 m (69 ft 6 1/4 in)CR	Doug Lane	20.14 m (66 ft 3/4 in)	Brian Oldfield	20.13 m (66 ft 1/2 in)
Discus Throw	Jay Silvester	64.92 m (212 ft 11 in)CR	Tim Vollmer	64.64 m (212 ft 0 in)	Rickard Drescher	61.54 m (201 ft 10 in)
Hammer throw	Al Schoterman	69.52 m (228 ft 1 in)	Harold Connolly	66.34 m (217 ft 7 in)	Albert Hall	66.32 m (217 ft 7 in)
Javelin throw	Fred Luke	84.55 m (277 ft 4 in)	Milt Sonsky	80.41 m (263 ft 9 in)	John Kaveny	78.38 m (257 ft 1 in)
Pentathlon	Rick Wanamaker	3410 pts				
All-around decathlon	Karl Harz	7976 pts				
Decathlon	Jeff Bennett	7910	Jeff Bannister	7890	John Warkentin	7807

=== Women track events ===
Event	Gold		Silver		Bronze	
100 meters	Alice Annum; Ghana; Rose Allwood; Jamaica; Iris Davis	11.5=CR 11.5=CR 11.5	Mildrette Netter	11.5	Barbara Ferrell	11.5
200 meters	Alice Annum; Ghana; Rose Allwood; Jamaica; Pamela Greene	23.4CR 23.7 23.8	Jacqueline Thompson	24.0	Pat Hawkins	24.1
400 meters	Kathy Hammond	52.3	Mable Fergerson	54.2	Beth Warner	54.6
800 meters	Carol Hudson	2.06.7	Cheryl Toussaint	2.06.7	Cis Schafer	2.07.5
1500 meters	Francie Larrieu	4.18.4	Eileen Claugus	4.24.0	Kathy Gibbons	4.28.2
3000 meters	Tena Anex	9.42.6 NR	Brenda Webb	9.50.3	Ellyn Cornish	9.59.3
100 meters hurdles	Mamie Rallins	13.5	Patricia Johnson	13.6	Lorna Tinney	13.6
200 meters hurdles	Pat Hawkins	26.3	Patricia Johnson	27.3	Nancy Kaiser; Janet Reusser	28.0
1500 meters walk	Jeannie Bocci	6:59.1	Lynn Olson	7:06.0	Sue Brodock	7:14.1

=== Women field events ===
Event	Gold		Silver		Bronze	
High jump	Audrey Reid; Jamaica; DeAnne Wilson	6 ft 0 1/2 in (1.84 m) 5 ft 8 in (1.72 m)	Sandi Goldsberry	5 ft 8 in (1.72 m)	Karen Moller	5 ft 7 in (1.7 m)
Long jump	Willye White	20 ft 6 1/4 in (6.25 m)	Martha Watson	20 ft 4 1/4 in (6.2 m)	Brenda Bryan	19 ft 11 3/4 in (6.08 m)
Shot put	Maren Seidler	52 ft 9 in (16.07 m)	Lynn Graham	50 ft 7 1/4 in (15.42 m)	Lynette Matthews	49 ft 6 1/4 in (15.09 m)
Discus Throw	Josephine de la Viña; Philippines; Olga Connolly	172 ft 0 in (52.42 m) 170 ft 8 in (52.01 m)	Monette Driscoll	152 ft 10 in (46.58 m)	Vivian Turner	150 ft 10 in (45.97 m)
Javelin throw	Sherry Calvert	184 ft 10 in (56.33 m)	Roberta Brown	181 ft 6 in (55.32 m)	Kathy Schmidt	180 ft 0 in (54.86 m)
Pentathlon	Jennifer Meldrum; Canada; Penny May; Canada; Jane Frederick	4251 4202 4169	Marilyn King	4064	Gail Fitzgerald	4034

== See also ==
- United States Olympic Trials (track and field)
