= 1971 USA Outdoor Track and Field Championships =

- Dates: June 25–27
- Host city: Eugene, Oregon; Bakersfield, California, United States
- Venue: Hayward Field; Memorial Stadium

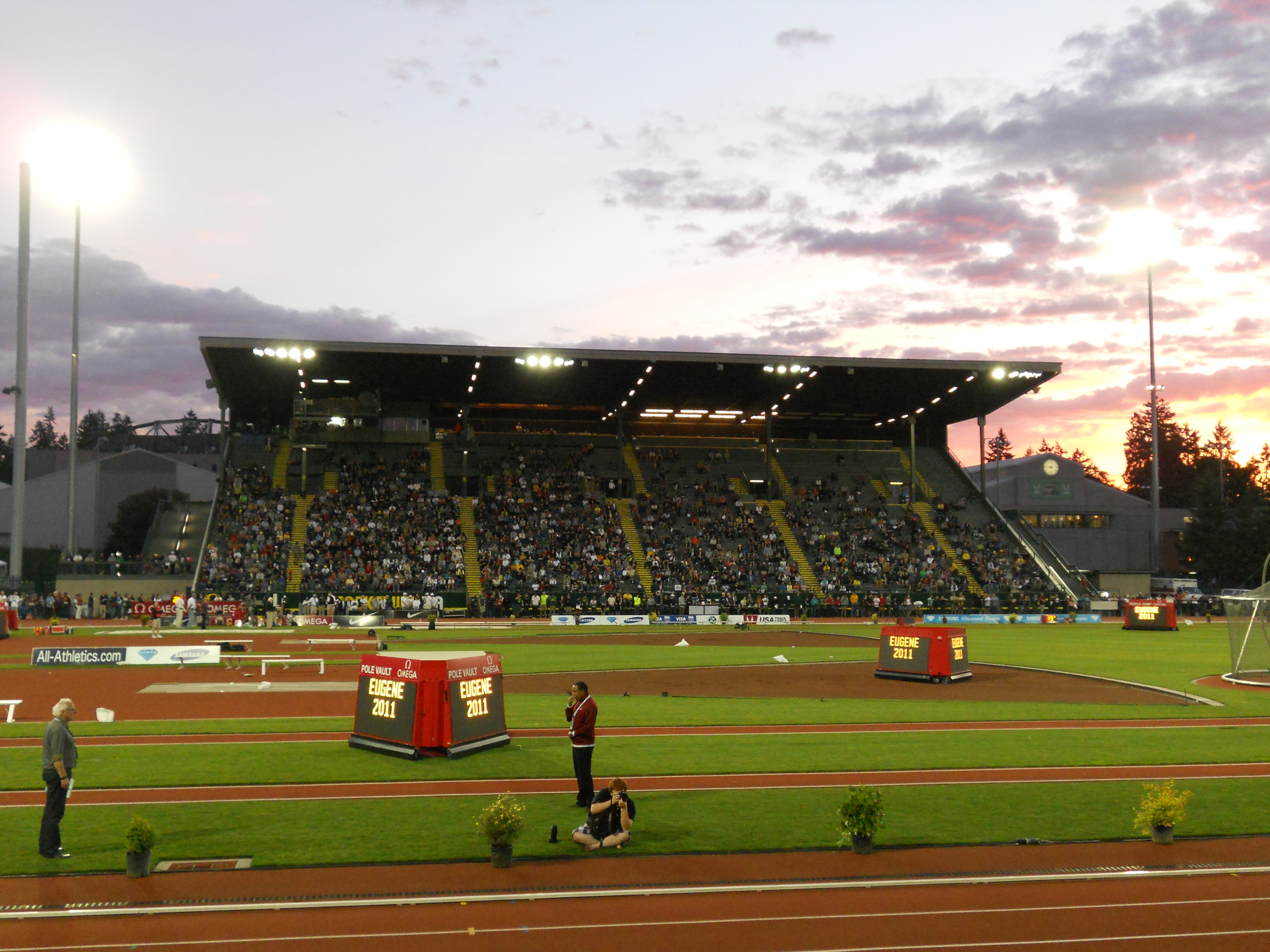

The 1971 USA Outdoor Track and Field Championships took place between June 25–27 at Hayward Field on the campus of University of Oregon in Eugene, Oregon. The Women's Championships took place at Memorial Stadium on the campus of Bakersfield College in Bakersfield, California. The meet was organized by the Amateur Athletic Union. The women's pentathlon took place at Los Alamos, New Mexico on June 12.

This is the meet where John Smith set the still standing world record in the 440 yard dash, an event now essentially discontinued on the international scene.

== Results ==
=== Men track events ===
Event	Gold		Silver		Bronze	
100 yards	Delano Meriwether	9.0w	James Green	9.0w	Donald Quarrie; Jamaica; Charles Greene	9.1w (9.24) 9.1w
220 yards	Donald Quarrie; Jamaica; Larry Black	20.2w 20.5w	Willie Deckard	20.6w	Marshall Dill	20.7w
440 yards	John Smith	44.5 WRy	Wayne Collett	44.7	Fred Newhouse	45.7
880 yards	Juris Luzins	1.47.1	Byron Dyce; Jamaica; Ken Swenson	1.47.3 1.47.6	Art Sandison	1.47.6
1 Mile	Martin Liquori	3.56.5	Jim Crawford	3.57.7	John Baker	3.59.8
3 Miles	Steve Prefontaine	12.58.6 MRy	Steve Stageberg	13.00.4	Frank Shorter	13.02.4
6 Miles	Frank Shorter	27.27.2	Garry Bjorklund	27.28.2	Juan Maximo Martinez; Mexico; Gerry Lindgren	27.37.0 27.46.4
Marathon	Kenneth Moore	2.16.48.6 MR	Frank Shorter	2.17.44.6	Herbert Lorenz	2.19.16.8
120 yard hurdles	Rod Milburn	13.1w	Ronald Draper	13.3w	Willie Davenport	13.4w
440 yard hurdles	Ralph Mann	49.3 MRy	Wesley Williams	49.3	Jim Seymour	50.0
3000 meters steeplechase	Sid Sink	8.26.4 NR	Michael Manley	8.27.6	Steve Savage	8.29.6
2 miles walk	Larry Young	13:49.50	Ron Laird	14:03.56	Jim Hanley	14:10.57

=== Men field events ===
Event	Gold		Silver		Bronze	
High jump	Reynaldo Brown	2.21 m (7 ft 3 in) MR	Patrick Matzdorf	2.18 m (7 ft 1 3/4 in)	Tim Heikkila	2.16 m (7 ft 1 in)
Pole vault	Jan Johnson	5.18 m (16 ft 11 3/4 in)	Dave Roberts	5.18 m (16 ft 11 3/4 in)	Sam Caruthers	5.03 m (16 ft 6 in)
Long jump	Arnie Robinson	8.20 m (26 ft 10 3/4 in)w	James (Bouncy) Moore	8.04 m (26 ft 4 1/2 in)w	Henry Jackson; Jamaica; Henry Hines	7.97 m (26 ft 1 3/4 in) 7.90 m (25 ft 11 in)
Triple jump	John Craft	16.64 m (54 ft 7 in) MR	Dave Smith	16.60 m (54 ft 5 1/2 in)	Barry McClure	16.36 m (53 ft 8 in)
Shot put	Karl Salb	20.49 m (67 ft 2 1/2 in)	Randy Matson	20.14 m (66 ft 3/4 in)	Al Feuerbach	20.14 m (66 ft 3/4 in)
Discus Throw	Tim Vollmer	63.50 m (208 ft 4 in)	Rickard Drescher	60.60 m (198 ft 9 in)	Gary Ordway	60.07 m (197 ft 0 in)
Hammer throw	George Frenn	70.13 m (230 ft 1 in)	Jacques Accambray; France; Al Schoterman	67.64 m (221 ft 10 in) 66.42 m (217 ft 10 in)	Albert Hall	66.39 m (217 ft 9 in)
Javelin throw	Bill Skinner	81.43 m (267 ft 1 in)	Cary Feldmann	80.19 m (263 ft 1 in)	Sam Colson	80.01 m (262 ft 6 in)
Pentathlon	Rick Wanamaker	3607 pts				
All-around decathlon	Rich Robinson	7279 pts				
Decathlon	Rickard Wanamaker	7989	Russ Hodge	7957	Jeff Bennett	7805

=== Women track events ===
Event	Gold		Silver		Bronze	
100 meters	Iris Davis	11.2	Raelene Boyle; Australia; Pat Hawkins	11.3 11.5	Mavis Laing	11.5
200 meters	Raelene Boyle; Australia; Kathie Lawson	23.1 23.3	Mable Fergerson	23.8	Rhonda McManus	23.9
400 meters	Mable Fergerson	53.3	Gwen Norman	53.8	Jane Burnett	54.0
800 meters	Cheryl Toussaint	2.04.3	Terry Hull	2.05.3	Carol Hudson	2.06.9
1500 meters	Kathy Gibbons	4.19.2	Francie Johnson	4.23.0	Barbara Lawson	4.23.8
2 miles	Doris Brown	10.07.0	Vicki Foltz	10.34.1	Beth Bonner	10.34.4
100 meters hurdles	Patricia Johnson	13.5	Mamie Rallins	13.6	Lacey O'Neal	13.6
200 meters hurdles	Pat Hawkins	26.1	Gayle Dell Australia; Mamie Rallins	27.1; 27.6	Bobbette King	27.8
One mile walk	Lynn Olson	7:53.8	Esther Marquez	8:22.2	Laurie Tucholski	8:22.3

=== Women field events ===
Event	Gold		Silver		Bronze	
High jump	Linda Iddings	1.73 m (5 ft 8 in)	Audrey Reid; Jamaica; Brenda Simpson	1.67 m (5 ft 5 1/2 in) 1.67 m (5 ft 5 1/2 in)	Sandi Goldsberry	1.67 m (5 ft 5 1/2 in)
Long jump	Kim Attlesey	6.32 m (20 ft 8 3/4 in)	Willye White	6.30 m (20 ft 8 in)	Martha Watson	6.13 m (20 ft 1 1/4 in)
Shot put	Lynn Graham	15.85 m (52 ft 0 in)	Lynette Matthews	15.24 m (50 ft 0 in)	Barbara Poulsen; New Zealand; Maren Seidler	15.15 m (49 ft 8 1/4 in) 15.11 m (49 ft 6 3/4 in)
Discus Throw	Josephine de la Viña; Philippines; Carol Frost	54.71 m (179 ft 5 in) 50.26 m (164 ft 10 in)	Ranee Kletchka	48.61 m (159 ft 5 in)	Iva Wright	46.30 m (151 ft 10 in)
Javelin throw	Sherry Calvert	54.74 m (179 ft 7 in)	Jean Sweeney	50.44 m (165 ft 5 in)	Barbara Friedrich	50.14 m (164 ft 6 in)
Pentathlon	Marilyn King	4731	Judy Durham	4525	Linda Iddings	4392

== See also ==
- United States Olympic Trials (track and field)
