= Kathy Gibbons =

American athlete

Personal information
- Born: August 1, 1954
- Died: January 13, 1982 Boulder, Colorado, U.S.

Sport
- Sport: Athletics
- Event: 10000 meters

Kathy Gibbons (later Kathy Gibbons Jackson) (August 1, 1954 – January 13, 1982) was a world record holder in the women's 10,000 meters.

== Early life ==
Gibbons attended Alhambra High School Phoenix, Arizona, then Northern Arizona University, and then Arizona State University, where she completed a master's degree in exercise physiology.

== Athletics career ==
Gibbons recorded one world record in the women's 10,000 metres of 34:51.0 on 12 June 1971 in Phoenix, Arizona.

Gibbons is also credited with the first world best time (according to the Association of Road Racing Statisticians) in the women's half marathon. She recorded a time of 1:23:56 in Phoenix, Arizona on the 7 March 1971.

Gibbons achieved the following results at the United States outdoor track and field championships:

- First in the 1500 m in 1971.
- Third in the 1500 m in 1972.
- Second in both the 1 mile and 2 miles in 1973.

Gibbons was also champion at the mile in the 1970 United States indoor championships.

== Later life and death ==
After college, Gibbons was a teacher and coach at Glendale Community College in Glendale, Arizona and then a coach at the University of Colorado. Gibbons was killed in 1982 after being struck by a vehicle while running in Colorado.

In 1982, the Kathy Gibbons Jackson Memorial Scholarship was established in her honor at Arizona State University.

In 1987, Gibbons was elected to the Arizona Sports Hall of Fame.

In 2013, Gibbons was elected to the Phoenix 10K and Marathon Hall of Fame.
