= 1970 USA Indoor Track and Field Championships =

National athletics championship event

- Dates: February 27
- Host city: New York City, New York, United States
- Venue: Madison Square Garden
- Level: Senior
- Type: Indoor
- Events: 22 (13 men's + 9 women's)

The 1970 USA Indoor Track and Field Championships were held at Madison Square Garden in New York City, New York. Organized by the Amateur Athletic Union (AAU), the competition took place on February 27 and served as the national championships in indoor track and field for the United States.

It was the first time since 1965 that the championships were staged at Madison Square Garden, where it would continue to be held until 1993. At the championships, Marty Liquori controversially shoved Henryk Szordykowski to win the mile. Szordykowski said after the race, "Liquori is a poor sport... He acted like an animal".

It was also the first time that the basketball throw event was removed from the program, which had been contested every year except 1928 since the first women's championships in 1927. Because of this, defending champion Barbara Friedrich did not return, saying "For a javelin thrower it's a great way of staying in shape over the winter. But the committee doesn't agree with me."

== Medal summary ==
=== Men ===
Event	Gold		Silver	Bronze
60 yards	Charles Greene	6.0		
600 yards	Martin McGrady	1:07.6		
1000 yards	Juris Luzins	2:06.2		
Mile run	Marty Liquori	4:00.9		
3 miles	Art DuLong	13:19.6		
60 yards hurdles	Willie Davenport	7.1		
High jump	Otis Burrell	2.13 m		
Pole vault	Bob Seagren	5.18 m		
Long jump	Norm Tate	8.04 m		
Triple jump	Norm Tate	16.27 m		
Shot put	Brian Oldfield	19.47 m		
Weight throw	George Frenn	21.47 m		
1 mile walk	Dave Romansky	6:14.0		

=== Women ===
Event	Gold		Silver		Bronze	
60 yards	Chi Cheng (TPE)	6.7	Iris Davis	NT		
220 yards	Diane Kummer	24.9				
440 yards	Kathy Hammond	55.2				
880 yards	Francie Kraker Johnson	2:10.5				
Mile run	Kathy Gibbons	4:58.5				
60 yards hurdles	Chi Cheng (TPE)	7.6	Pat Johnson	NT		
High jump	Debbie Brill (CAN)	1.80 m	Debbie Van Kiekebel (CAN)	5 ft 7 in (1.7 m)	Vann Abram	5 ft 6 in (1.67 m)
Long jump	Chi Cheng (TPE)	6.42 m	Willye White	20 ft 3 3/4 in (6.19 m)		
Shot put	Mary Jacobson	14.25 m				
