= Hassan Bergaoui =

Tunisian hurdler

Personal information
- Nationality: Tunisian
- Born: 3 October 1949 (age 76)

Sport
- Sport: Track and field
- Event: 400 metres hurdles

Hassan Bergaoui (born 3 October 1949) is a Tunisian hurdler. He competed in the men's 400 metres hurdles at the 1972 Summer Olympics.
