= Ossie Johnson =

New Zealand athlete

Personal information
- Born: Roland Oswald Johnson; 28 October 1906 Dunedin, New Zealand
- Died: 12 February 2002 (aged 95) Dunedin, New Zealand
- Height: 1.70 m (5 ft 7 in)
- Spouse: Lorna Rachelle Waddell (m. 1938; died 1996)
- Relative: Roger Johnson (son)

Sport
- Country: New Zealand
- Sport: Athletics

Roland Oswald Johnson (28 October 1906 − 12 February 2002) was a New Zealand athlete who represented his country in the triple jump at the 1930 British Empire Games in Hamilton, Ontario. He finished in sixth place, with a distance of 13.16 m. He was the father of hurdler and operations management academic Roger Johnson.

Johnson died in Dunedin in 2002, and his ashes were buried at Andersons Bay Cemetery.
