= Julio Ferrer =

Puerto Rican sprinter (1953–2022)

Personal information
- Full name: Julio E. Ferrer Andino
- Nationality: Puerto Rican
- Born: 23 May 1953 San Juan, Puerto Rico
- Died: 4 January 2022 (aged 68) Carolina, Puerto Rico
- Height: 1.82 m (6 ft 0 in)
- Weight: 74 kg (163 lb)

Sport
- Sport: Sprinting
- Event: 400 metres hurdles
Medal record
Representing Puerto Rico
Central American and Caribbean Games
Silver medal – second place	1978 Medellin	400m hurdles

Julio E. Ferrer Andino (23 May 1953 – 4 January 2022) was a Puerto Rican sprinter who specialized in the 400-meter hurdles and sprint relays throughout the 1970s and early 1980s. A two-time Olympian, Ferrer represented Puerto Rico at the 1972 Summer Olympics in Munich and the 1976 Summer Olympics in Montreal, where he competed in both the individual 400-meter hurdles and the 4 × 400-meter relay. On the regional stage, he won the 400-meter hurdles title at the Central American and Caribbean Championships in Athletics (1973 and 1979) and took silver at the 1978 Central American and Caribbean Games. He also earned fourth place at the 1979 Pan American Games and seventh place at the 1983 edition.

== Early life and career ==
He was born on 23 May 1953 in San Juan, Puerto Rico.

His Olympic debut was in the 400 meters hurdles at the 1972 Summer Olympics, where he finished 6th in Heat 4 of the quarterfinals. Then, he returned to compete in 1976 Summer Olympics in the same sport where he finished at position 8th in heat 2 round 2 from three round.Other than individual competition, he also competed with his teammate in the 4 X 400 hurdles at the 1976 Summer Olympics, alongside Pedro Ferrer, Iván Mangual and Jorge Ortiz, where they finished 6th in Heat 1 of the quarterfinals.

He competed at the 1978 Central American and Caribbean Games, where he contested two events: the 400 m hurdles and the 100 m hurdles. He won a silver medal in the 400m hurdles at 50.86 seconds, which was won by Clive Barriffe from Jamaica at 50.16 seconds, followed by Alexis Misgnak from Cuba at 50.97 seconds, Frank Montieth at 51.00 seconds, and Jose Santiago from Puerto Rico at 51.54 seconds.

He contested the same event at the 1979 and 1983 Pan American Games, finishing fourth and seventh, respectively. He also won twice, capturing the 400-meter hurdles title at the Central American and Caribbean Championships in Athletics in 1973 and 1979.

== Personal life and death ==
He was the younger brother of sprinter Pedro Ferrer.Ferrer died on 4 January 2022, at the age of 68.

== International competitions ==
Year	Competition	Venue	Position	Event	Notes
Representing Puerto Rico
1972	Olympic Games	Munich, West Germany	36th (h)	400 m hurdles	54.83
1973	Central American and Caribbean Championships	Maracaibo, Venezuela	4th	110 m hurdles	14.4
1973	Central American and Caribbean Championships	Maracaibo, Venezuela	1st	400 m hurdles	51.9
1973	Universiade	Moscow, Soviet Union	19th (h)	400 m hurdles	53.1
1976	Olympic Games	Montreal, Canada	14th (sf)	400 m hurdles	51.04
1976	Olympic Games	Montreal, Canada	11th (h)	4 × 400 m relay	3:06.08
1978	Central American and Caribbean Games	Medellín, Colombia	–	110 m hurdles	DNF
1978	Central American and Caribbean Games	Medellín, Colombia	2nd	400 m hurdles	50.86
1979	Central American and Caribbean Championships	Guadalajara, Mexico	1st	400 m hurdles	51.4
1979	Pan American Games	San Juan, Puerto Rico	4th	400 m hurdles	51.48
1979	Pan American Games	San Juan, Puerto Rico	–	400 m hurdles	DQ
1983	Pan American Games	Caracas, Venezuela	7th	400 m hurdles	51.94

== Personal bests ==
- 400 metres hurdles – 50.86 (1978)
