= Anthony Collins =

Anthony Collins may refer to:

- Anthony Collins (philosopher) (1676–1729), English philosopher and deist
- Anthony Collins (American football) (born 1985), American football player
- Anthony Collins (composer) (1893–1963), British film score composer and conductor
- Anthony Collins (cricketer) (born 1949), New Zealand cricketer
- Anthony Collins (judge) (born 1960), Irish judge
- Anthony G. Collins (born 1949), Australian-American academic administrator

== See also ==
- Antony Collins (disambiguation)
- Tony Collins (disambiguation)
