= Rendell McIntosh =

New Zealand athlete and historian

Personal information
- Born: Rendell Ian McIntosh
- Spouse: Jillian de Beer (m. 1988)

Sport
- Country: New Zealand
- Sport: Track and field
- Event(s): 400 metres hurdles 800 metres

Achievements and titles
- National finals: 400 m hurdles champion (1972, 1975); 800 m champion (1976)
- Personal best: 400 m hurdles – 51.95

Rendell Ian McIntosh is a New Zealand historian and former track athlete. He won three national athletics championship titles and represented his country at the 1974 British Commonwealth Games in the 400 metres hurdles. He later instigated the running of the Auckland Marathon across the Auckland Harbour Bridge, and became the manager of the historic house Alberton in the Auckland suburb of Mount Albert.

== Athletics ==
McIntosh grew up on a farm near Ashburton. Representing Canterbury, he won the national men's under-19 400 metres hurdles championship in 1971, with a winning time of 56.1 seconds. He went on to win the senior men's title in the same event the following year, recording a time of 53.4 seconds, and again in 1975 (53.54 s). He also won the national men's 800 metres championship title in 1976, in a time of 1:49.5.

At the 1974 British Commonwealth Games in Christchurch, McIntosh competed for New Zealand in the men's 400 metres hurdles. He finished fifth in his heat, with a time of 53.1 seconds, and progressed to the semi-finals. In his semi-final, McIntosh finished in sixth place, but his time of 51.95 seconds was a New Zealand national record for the event.

McIntosh worked with Paul Ryken to plan and implement the inaugural Auckland Marathon crossing the Auckland Harbour Bridge, which took place on 25 October 1992. McIntosh was a co-founder of the Auckland Marathon Company and was the race promoter for the event in 1992 and 1993.

== Other activities ==
After leaving school, McIntosh worked for the Farmers Co-op, initially in the stock and station department in Ashburton and then in the credit department in Christchurch. In 1974, he joined Air New Zealand, working in marketing and promotions for 16 years. He then established his own events management company, RIMU Promotions, and set up the Auckland Marathon Company with his wife, Jillian de Beer.

After moving to the Auckland suburb of Parnell, McIntosh began researching the history of Judges Bay in 2002. In 2005, he was one of the founders of Parnell Heritage, and has served as the group's chair.

In 2005, McIntosh was appointed manager of Alberton, an historic house in Mount Albert originally belonging to Allan Kerr Taylor and now owned by Heritage New Zealand.

== Personal life ==
In 1988, McIntosh married Jillian de Beer at the Church of the Good Shepherd, Lake Tekapo.
