= Mike Murei =

Kenyan hurdler

Personal information
- Nationality: Kenyan
- Born: 15 March 1950 (age 76)

Sport
- Sport: Track and field
- Event: 400 metres hurdles

Mike Murei (born 15 March 1950) is a Kenyan hurdler. He competed in the men's 400 metres hurdles at the 1972 Summer Olympics.

== Career ==
Murei attended St. Patrick's High School and was the first of its alumni to qualify for the Olympic Games. He was first recruited to Eastern New Mexico University, where he ran for the Eastern New Mexico Greyhounds alongside Phillip Ndoo and Josh Owusu. Following budget cuts at Eastern New Mexico and out of concern that he could be kicking another athlete off a scholarship, he reportedly called University of Wisconsin-Madison President John Carrier Weaver directly in 1974, asking to attend the school.

He was an All-American runner for the Wisconsin Badgers track and field team as a member of their runner-up distance medley relay team at the 1978 NCAA Indoor Track and Field Championships.

== Personal life ==
Murei was from Eldoret, Kenya, near the Great Rift Valley. He was connected to Wisconsin through his friend Mark Sang, an 800 metres runner. While not on the Wisconsin team, he lived with a family near Sun Prairie, Wisconsin.
