= Mavis Laing =

American sprinter

Personal information
- Born: December 5, 1953 (age 72)
- Height: 5 ft 6 in (1.68 m)

Sport
- Sport: Athletics
- Coached by: Fred Moore

Achievements and titles
- National finals: 1970 champion (440 yd)
Medal record
Representing the United States
Women's athletics
Pan American Games
Gold medal – first place	1971 Cali	4×400 m relay

Mavis Laing (born December 5, 1953) is an American former track and field sprinter and pentathlete. Her highest level honour was a gold medal at the 1971 Pan American Games, where she anchored the American women's 4 × 400 meters relay team to victory, alongside Cheryl Toussaint, Esther Stroy and Gwen Norman. It was the first time the event had been held at the competition.

Born to Laura and Clarence Laing, she attended Arcadia High School in Phoenix, Arizona and in the absence of a track program at the high school, she joined the AAU Phoenix Track Club. Under the coaching of Fred Moore, she became an outstanding high school level athlete. At the age of fifteen she competed in the pentathlon at the 1969 USA Outdoor Track and Field Championships, placing fifth overall.

At the 1970 national championships, 16-year-old Laing won the 440-yard dash in an American record time of 52.9 seconds, defeating former champion Jarvis Scott. She also managed third place in the pentathlon with a personal record of 4533 points. That same year she broke the Arizona state records in the 200 meters, 440 yards and 400 meters. A further state record followed in 1971, as she ran 10.6 seconds for the 100-yard dash. She placed fourth in that event at the 1971 USA Outdoor Track and Field Championships (third amongst Americans). Laing also competed in international matches for the United States, winning events against West Germany and the Soviet Union.

Following her graduation from high school in 1971, she received an offer of an athletic scholarship from Tennessee A & I, where Wilma Rudolph and Wyomia Tyus had been trained. Preferring to remain in the local area and with her track club, she opted instead for Arizona State University. A bout of mononucleosis ruined her chances to make the team for the 1972 Summer Olympics and she focused on academics instead. She earned an undergraduate degree in psychology before going on to complete a master's degree in speech and language pathology at New York University. Laing worked as a teacher, then moved to Chicago to work in the field of speech therapy. Later, she became vice president of regional sales at Xerox.

In 2002 she was inducted into the Scottsdale Sports Hall Of Fame. Her state records remained unbeaten for over 30 years.

== International competitions ==
Year	Competition	Venue	Position	Event	Notes
1971	Pan American Games	Cali, Colombia	1st	4 × 400 m relay	3:32.45
