= Ari Salin =

Finnish hurdler and sprinter (1947–2026)

Ari Salin

Ari Juhani Salin (20 January 1947 – 4 March 2026) was a Finnish hurdler and sprinter. Salin set Finnish records in both the 110 metres hurdles and the 400 metres hurdles and competed in the 1972 Summer Olympics.

== Career ==
Salin won his first title at the national championships in 1968, when he won the 110 m hurdles in 14.7. The same year, he broke the Finnish record for the first time, running 14.2 and improving the previous record by one-tenth of a second. He repeated as national champion in 1969 and represented Finland in the 1969 European Athletics Championships in Athens, but was eliminated in the first round. Originally, the 110 m hurdles were his main event, and he only dabbled in the 400 m hurdles; in 1970, however, he seriously took up the longer event as well. He broke the national records in both events several times that year, setting his best times of 13.8 and 49.9 in Prague in a dual meet against Czechoslovakia.

In 1971, Salin improved his national record in the 400 m hurdles to 49.6 and was national champion in both hurdling events. At the 1971 European Championships in Helsinki, he qualified for the final in the 400 m hurdles, placing sixth in 50.57; he remained the last Finn to qualify for a European Championships final in men's 400 m hurdles until Oskari Mörö did it in 2014. In 1972, Salin won his third consecutive national title in the 400 m hurdles and set his personal best and last Finnish record, 49.5, in Helsinki. At the 1972 Summer Olympics in Munich, Salin represented Finland in the 400 m hurdles, as well as (with Stig Lönnqvist, Ossi Karttunen and Markku Kukkoaho) in the 4 × 400 m relay; in the hurdles he was eliminated in the first round, but the Finnish relay team placed sixth in the final and set the still-standing national record of 3:01.12.

In total, Salin won eight individual national championship titles between 1968 and 1974 – four in the 400 m hurdles, three in the 110 m hurdles, and one in the 60 m indoor hurdles. In addition, he ran for Viipurin Urheilijat when they won the 1976 national championship in the 4 × 400 m relay.

== Personal life and death ==
Salin was married to Riitta Salin, former world record holder in women's 400 metres. He died on 4 March 2026, at the age of 79.
