= Bill Hartley (athlete) =

British sprinter & hurdler (born 1950)

Personal information
- Nationality: British (English)
- Born: 27 June 1950 (age 76) Liverpool, England

Sport
- Sport: Athletics
- Event: hurdles
- Club: Liverpool Harriers
Medal record
Men's athletics
Representing Great Britain
European Championships
Gold medal – first place	1974 Rome	4 × 400 m relay
Representing England
Commonwealth Games
Silver medal – second place	1974 Christchurch	4 × 400 m relay

William John Hartley (born 27 June 1950) is an English former athlete.

== Biography ==
Hartley was raised in Lydiate, Lancashire (now Merseyside) on the outskirts of Liverpool where his family ran a market garden. He began his athletic career at age 13 as a high jumper. By age 18 he held the Under-19 record for 400 m hurdles (52.9 seconds).

Hartley finished third behind Alan Pascoe in the 400 metres hurdles event at the 1973 AAA Championships and then won a silver medal representing England at the 1974 British Commonwealth Games in Christchurch, New Zealand.

The year continued to bring significant success as he won a gold medal at the European Championships in Rome in the 400 m relay and by virtue of being the highest placed British athlete in the 400 metres hurdles the 1974 AAA Championships was considered the British 400 metres hurdles champion. He then won the title outright at the 1975 AAA Championships.

He later represented England in the 400 metres hurdles event, at the 1978 Commonwealth Games in Edmonton, Canada.

He was a member of the winning Europa Cup 4 × 400 m relay team, along with Alan Pascoe, David Jenkins and Jim Aukett. An achilles tendon problem ended his running career in 1982, after which he became a sprint coach and conditioner for Widnes Rugby League Club and then Wigan Rugby League Club.

In 1977 Hartley married fellow athlete Donna Hartley but the marriage later ended in divorce. Hartley now runs the family floriculture business in Lydiate. His son Tom Hartley plays for Lancashire County Cricket Club and England.
