= St. Patrick's High School (Iten, Kenya) =

Secondary school in Kenya

Coordinates: 0°40′26″N 35°30′19″E

- Iten; Kenya

Information
- Former name: Chebokokwa School
- School type: Boys' Secondary Boarding School
- Religious affiliation: Roman Catholicism
- Established: 1961
- Affiliation: Roman Catholic Diocese of Eldoret

St. Patrick's High School (formerly Chebokokwa School) in Iten, Elgeyo Marakwet County, (formerly Rift Valley Province) in Kenya is a boys only secondary school operated by the Roman Catholic Diocese of Eldoret. It operates as a boarding school for about 1600 students, from all parts of Kenya. The school has a staff of about 28 teachers and a similar number of support personnel.

The school was founded by the Patrician Brothers, Irish missionaries to Kenya in 1961, following the Mau Mau uprising, when there were only two other secondary schools for African boys north of Naivasha.

The school offsets student fees with an on-campus farm. The school claims to be in the academic top 100 out of 2200 such schools in Kenya. The “Iten Maths Contest,” started in 1975, is a national mathematics competition of secondary schools, hosted, organised and judged by St. Patrick's High School staff. In 1989, the school was one of the first in Kenya to get computers. It remains one of the most advanced through its network of alumni worldwide.

== Athletics ==
Brother Colm O'Connell of Ireland came to Iten in 1976 expecting to stay just three months teaching geography but has remained there ever since. He began coaching a track and field team at the school. The product of the team is some of the best middle- and long-distance running athletes in the world, including 800 metre world record holder David Rudisha and the first sub-two-hour marathon runner Sabastian Sawe. Many athletes are drawn to the school as a result. The surrounding town of Iten, with a population of about 4,000, is said to house as many as 500 athletes, a high altitude training camp, and many people related to the sport.

The school also has won the national volleyball championship 17 times, 15 in a row.

== Notable alumni ==
- Matthew Birir -Olympic Gold medalist and World Junior Champion
- Michael Boit - Olympic Bronze medalist, former Sports Commissioner of Kenya and currently a professor of sports science at Kenyatta University
- Charles Cheruiyot
- Kipkoech Cheruiyot - World Junior record holder
- Cornelius Chirchir - World Junior record holder, World Junior and Youth Champion
- William Chirchir - World Junior record holder, World Junior Champion
- Ibrahim Hussein - World record holder* in the Marathon, New York Marathon winner and 3-time winner of the Boston Marathon
- Japheth Kimutai - World Junior record holder
- Wilson Boit Kipketer -World record holder 3000 metres steeplechase, World Champion, Olympic medalist
- Wilson Kipketer - 4 World Championships, 2 Olympic medals, multiple world records at 800 metres and 1000 metres.
- Godfrey Kiprotich - long-distance runner
- Michael Kipyego - middle- and long-distance runner, multiple marathon winner
- Christopher Kipyego - middle- and long-distance runner, multiple marathon winner
- Mike Murei - hurdler, first alumni to qualify for the Olympics
- Peter Rono - Olympic Gold medalist
- Isaac Songok - World Junior record holder, World Youth Champion and Cross Country World Champion
- Sabastian Sawe - First person to run a record-eligible marathon in under two hours, current marathon world record holder
