= Antony Collins =

Antony Collins may refer to:

- Antony Collins (racehorse trainer), see Gay Future
- Antony Collins (inline hockey), player for Australia men's national inline hockey team

== See also ==
- Anthony Collins (disambiguation)
- Tony Collins (disambiguation)
