= David Scharer =

English hurdler

Personal information
- Nationality: British (English)
- Born: 15 October 1942 (age 83) Brighton, England

Sport
- Sport: Athletics
- Event: 400 metres hurdles
- Club: Brighton & Hove AC

David Henry Scharer (born 15 October 1942), is a male former athlete from England who competed at the Commonwealth Games.

== Biography ==
Scharer was a member of the Brighton & Hove Athletics Club and specialised in hurdles.

Scharer represented the England team at the 1970 British Commonwealth Games in Edinburgh, Scotland. He competed in the 400 metres hurdles event, reaching the final.

He also competed in the 1971 European Athletics Championships in Helsinki.
