= Norman Brinkworth =

Pakistani hurdler (born 1944)

Personal information
- Nationality: Pakistani
- Born: 28 February 1944 (age 82) Lahore, Punjab Province, British India

Sport
- Sport: Track and field
- Event: 400 metres hurdles
Medal record
Men's athletics
Representing Pakistan
Asian Games
Bronze medal – third place	1970 Bangkok	400 m hurdles

Norman Brinkworth (born 28 February 1944) is a Pakistani hurdler. He competed in the men's 400 metres hurdles at the 1972 Summer Olympics. He won a bronze medal in the 400 metres hurdles at the 1970 Asian Games.

Brinkworth was born in an Anglo-Indian family from Lahore. He was the national champion of Pakistan in the 400 meters hurdles. He later migrated with his family to Germany.

== See also ==
- List of Pakistani records in athletics
