= Pat Hawkins (hurdler) =

American sprinter and hurdler

Personal information
- Born: August 24, 1950 (age 75) Brooklyn, United States

Sport
- Sport: Track and field
Medal record
Representing United States
Pan American Games
Gold medal – first place	1971 Cali	4x100m relay

Patricia Hawkins (born August 24, 1950) is a former US national champion sprinter and hurdler, and the former American record holder in the women's 200-meter hurdles.

== Athletics ==
In college, Hawkins ran for the LIU Brooklyn Blackbirds team (now known as the LIU Sharks) in Long Island, New York. After graduating, she represented Brooklyn's Atoms Track Club, founded by Fred Thompson, later an assistant coach for the 1988 US Olympic track and field team.

Hawkins was a four-time US national champion in the women's 200-meter hurdles from 1969 to 1972. In 1971, she set an American record in the 200-meter hurdles, improving upon her existing American record with a time of 26.1 seconds. She won a silver medal in the 100 meter dash at the 1971 USA Outdoor Track and Field Championships and a bronze medal at the 1972 USA Outdoor Track and Field Championships in the 200-meter hurdles.

She won the US National Indoor Championship 60-meter dash in 1971.

She was a member of the 1971 Pan American Games gold medal-winning 4x100-meter relay team.

== Awards ==
She won the women's track and field AAU prize in 1970.
