= Rolf Ziegler =

German hurdler (born 1951)

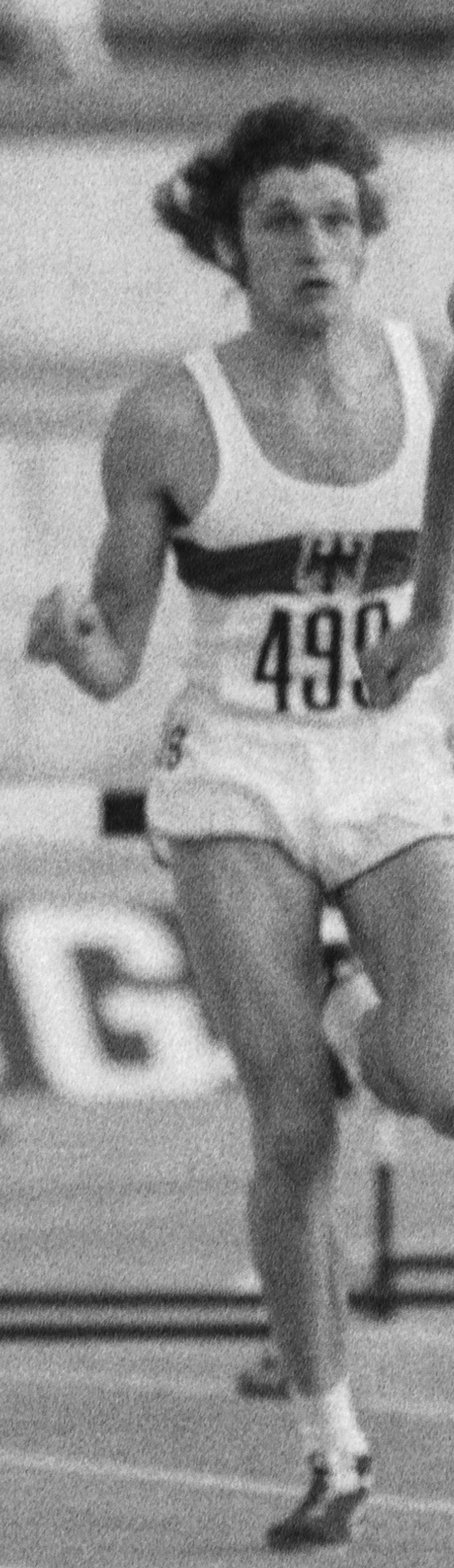
- Ziegler at European Athletics Championships 1974 in Rome

Personal information
- Nationality: German
- Born: 17 January 1951 (age 75) Stuttgart, West Germany
- Height: 1.88 m (6 ft 2 in)

Sport
- Sport: Track and field
- Events: 400 m hurdles and 4 × 400 m relay
Medal record
Men's athletics
Representing West Germany
European Championships
| Silver medal – second place | 1974 Roma | 4×400 m |
Summer Universiade
| Gold medal – first place | 1975 Rome | 400 m hurdles |
| Bronze medal – third place | 1977 Sofia | 400 m hurdles |

Rolf Ziegler (born 17 January 1951) is a former athlete who specialized in the 400 metres hurdles. He represented West Germany at the 1972 Munich Olympics and the World University Games, winning in 1975 and coming third in 1977. He competed for the club SKV Egolsheim.

== Biography ==
He won the silver medal in 4 × 400 metres relay at the 1974 European Championships together with teammates Hermann Köhler, Horst-Rüdiger Schlöske and Karl Honz. Ziegler also competed in the individual 400 metres hurdles contest and finished eighth.
