= Dick Bruggeman =

American hurdler

Personal information
- Full name: Richard John Dick Bruggeman
- Nationality: American
- Born: June 13, 1947 (age 79)
- Height: 186 cm (6 ft 1 in)

Sport
- Sport: Track and field
- Event: 1972 Summer Olympics

Richard John "Dick" Bruggeman (born June 13, 1947) is an American hurdler. He competed in the men's 400 metres hurdles at the 1972 Summer Olympics.

Bruggeman was an All-American sprinter for the Ohio State Buckeyes track and field team, finishing 4th in the 600 yards at the 1970 NCAA Indoor Track and Field Championships.
