= Gladstone Agbamu =

Nigerian hurdler

Personal information
- Nationality: Nigerian
- Born: Gladstone Gregory Agbamu; 26 November 1942 (age 83)
- Died: 02 October 2017

Sport
- Sport: Track and field
- Event: 400 metres hurdles

Gladstone Agbamu (born 23 November 1944) is a Nigerian hurdler. He competed in the men's 400 metres hurdles at the 1972 Summer Olympics. He was one of the top Nigerian athletes in the 1970s, winning back-to-back national titles in the 400m hurdles in 1974 and 1975, the first person to accomplish the feat. He later served as head coach of the national track and field team.
