= Tony Collins (hurdler) =

British hurdler

Personal information
- Nationality: British (English)
- Born: Wandsworth, London, England

Sport
- Sport: Athletics
- Event: 400m hurdles
- Club: Herne Hill Harriers

Tony William George Collins (born c.1949) is a former international hurdler who competed at the Commonwealth Games.

== Biography ==
Collins was a member of the Herne Hill Harriers and specialised in the 400 m hurdles. In 1968, he won the Junior AAA title.

Collins represented the England team at the 1970 British Commonwealth Games in Edinburgh, Scotland, where he competed in the 400 metres hurdles event, reaching the semi-final.

Shortly after the Games, Collins finished runner-up behind Bob Roberts at the 1970 AAA Championships. He set a Surrey record over the 400 hurdles in 1971.
