= Christian Rudolph =

German sprinter

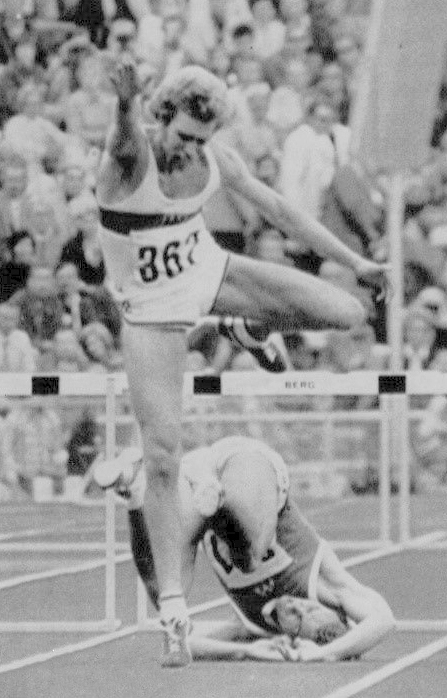
- Büttner tripping over Rudolph at the 1972 Olympics

Personal information
- Born: 15 February 1949 (age 77) Bernsdorf, Germany
- Height: 185 cm (6 ft 1 in)
- Weight: 80 kg (176 lb)

Sport
- Sport: Athletics
- Event: 400 metres hurdles
- Club: SC Cottbus

Achievements and titles
- Personal best: 400 mH – 49.34 (1971)
Medal record
Men's athletics
Representing East Germany
European Championships
Silver medal – second place	1971 Helsinki	400 m hurdles

Christian Rudolph (born 15 February 1949) is a retired East German sprinter who specialized in the 400 metres hurdles. He won a silver medal at the 1971 European Championships. In semifinals of the 1972 Summer Olympics he tore his Achilles tendon and tumbled, causing the nearby runner Dieter Büttner to fall too. The injury forced Rudolph to immediately retire from athletics. Domestically he won the East German 400 m title in 1969–1972. In retirement Rudolph worked as a teacher of law and physical education in Cottbus.
