= Cosmas Silei =

Kenyan former middle distance runner (born 1948)

Cosmas Silei (born 10 September 1948) is a Kenyan former middle distance runner who competed in the 1972 Summer Olympics.
