= Ivan Daniš =

Czech hurdler

Personal information
- Nationality: Czech
- Born: 29 January 1951 (age 75) Žilina, Czechoslovakia

Sport
- Sport: Track and field
- Event: 400 metres hurdles

Ivan Daniš (born 29 January 1951) is a Czech hurdler. He competed in the men's 400 metres hurdles at the 1972 Summer Olympics.
