= Tadeusz Kulczycki =

Polish hurdler (born 1948)

Personal information
- Nationality: Polish
- Born: 1 January 1948 (age 78) Nekla, Poland

Sport
- Sport: Track and field
- Event: 400 metres hurdles
Medal record
Representing Poland
Summer Universiade
Bronze medal – third place	1973 Moscow	110m hurdles

Tadeusz Kulczycki (born 1 January 1948) is a Polish hurdler. He competed in the men's 400 metres hurdles at the 1972 Summer Olympics.
