= Dieter Büttner =

German hurdler (born 1949)

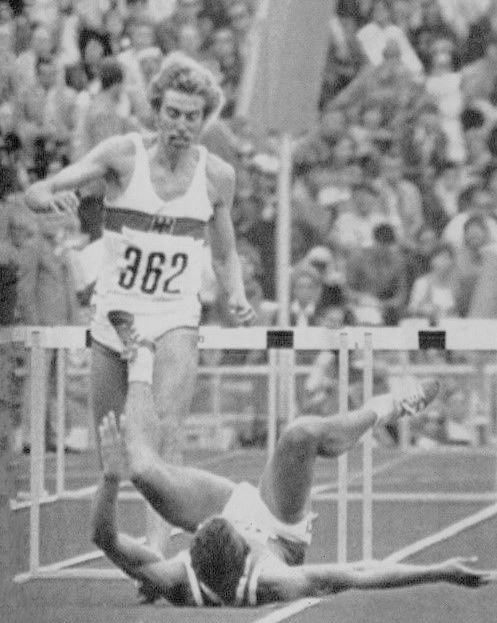
- Büttner (left) at the 1972 Olympics

Personal information
- Born: 24 February 1949 (age 77) Celle, Germany
- Height: 191 cm (6 ft 3 in)
- Weight: 80 kg (176 lb)

Sport
- Sport: Athletics
- Event: 400 metres hurdles
- Club: Bayer Leverkusen

Achievements and titles
- Personal best: 400 mH – 49.21 (1972)

Dieter Wolfgang Büttner (born 24 February 1949) is a retired West German hurdler who competed in the 400 m event at the 1972 Summer Olympics. In the semifinals he tumbled over Christian Rudolph, who had obstructed his path. The West German team launched a protest, but it was rejected because Büttner had no chance to reach the final anyway. Büttner held the German 400 m title in 1971 and 1972. After retiring from competitions he worked as a teacher of physical education, geography and Evangelicalism.
