= Stig Lönnqvist =

Finnish sprinter

Personal information
- Nationality: Finnish
- Born: 12 April 1949 (age 77)

Sport
- Sport: Sprinting
- Event: 4 × 400 metres relay
Medal record
Men's athletics
Representing Finland
European Championships
Bronze medal – third place	1974 Rome	4×400 m

Stig Lönnqvist (born 12 April 1949) is a Finnish sprinter. He competed in the 4 × 400 metres relay at the 1972 Summer Olympics and the 1976 Summer Olympics.
