= Mike Cotton (pole vaulter) =

American pole vaulter (born 1951)

Personal information
- Full name: Richard Michael Cotton
- National team: United States
- Born: April 9, 1951 (age 75)

Sport
- Sport: Track and field
- Event: Pole vault
- College team: University of Florida

Richard Michael Cotton (born April 9, 1951) is a former American college and international track and field athlete who was the United States national champion pole vaulter.

Cotton attended the University of Florida in Gainesville, Florida, where he was a member of the Florida Gators track and field team. He was the 1973 National Collegiate Athletic Association (NCAA) pole vault champion, as well as the Southeastern Conference (SEC) champion in 1971 and 1973. He earned All-American recognition in 1973 and he was an All-SEC selection in 1971, 1972 and 1973. He held the University of Florida's pole vault record of seventeen feet, six inches for fourteen years and was a member of the 1976 USA National Team. In 1973, he was U.S. Outdoor National Pole Vault Champion and Pan-Am Games champion.

Cotton graduated from the University of Florida with a bachelor's degree in business administration in 1973, and he was inducted into the University of Florida Athletic Hall of Fame as a "Gator Great" in 2009.

Cotton founded and manages Cotton's All Lines Insurance in Gainesville, Florida.

== See also ==
- List of University of Florida alumni
- List of University of Florida Athletic Hall of Fame members
