= John Akii-Bua =

Ugandan hurdler

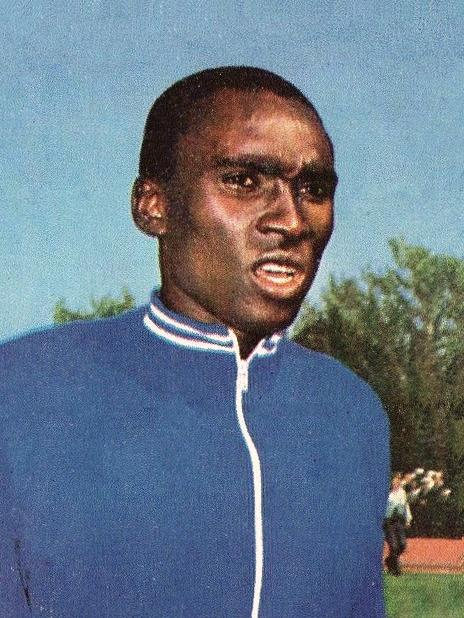
- John Akii-Bua c. 1972

Personal information
- Born: 3 December 1949 Lira, Uganda
- Died: 20 June 1997 (aged 47) Kampala, Uganda
- Height: 1.88 m (6 ft 2 in)
- Weight: 77 kg (170 lb)

Sport
- Sport: Athletics
- Events: 400 m, 400 m hurdles

Achievements and titles
- Personal bests: 400 m – 45.82 (1976); 400 mH – 47.82 (1972)
Medal record
Representing Uganda
Olympic Games
Gold medal – first place	1972 Munich	400 m hurdles
All-Africa Games
Gold medal – first place	1973 Lagos	400 m hurdles
Silver medal – second place	1978 Algiers	400 m hurdles

John Akii-Bua (3 December 1949 – 20 June 1997) was a Ugandan hurdler and the first Olympic champion from his country Uganda. In 1986, he was a recipient of the Silver Olympic Order.

== Biography ==
Akii-Bua was raised in a family of 43 children from one father and his eight wives. Akii-Bua started his athletic career as a short-distance hurdler, but failed to qualify for the 1968 Olympics. Coached by British-born athletics coach Malcolm Arnold, he was introduced to the 400 meter hurdles. Beyond the hurdles, Akii-Bua was a versatile athlete; in 1971, he set a Ugandan national record in the decathlon with 6,933 points, a record that stood for decades. Following his Olympic triumph, he continued his dominance on the continent, winning gold at the 1973 All-Africa Games in Lagos. Even while his international career was being throttled by political restrictions, he managed to record a personal best of 45.82 seconds in the 400-meter flat in 1976. Arnold identified that while Akii-Bua lacked raw sprinting speed, his willpower and endurance were suited for the longer distance. To prepare for the demands of the event, he adopted a gruelling training regimen that included running 1,500-meter repeats over high hurdles while wearing a 25lb weighted vest. He also performed high-altitude conditioning in the hills of Kabale, consisting of 600-meter uphill sprints twice daily.

Although he finished fourth in the 1970 Commonwealth Games and running the fastest time of 1971 and finishing second at the British 1972 AAA Championships, he was not a big favourite for the 1972 Summer Olympics in Munich, having limited competitive experience. Nevertheless, he won the final there, setting a world record time of 47.82 seconds despite running on the inside lane. Running in Lane 1 was considered a major disadvantage due to the tighter radius of the turn, which required more energy to maintain momentum. Despite suffering from severe pre-race nerves that prevented him from eating, Akii-Bua became the first man to break the 48-second barrier in the event. Following his victory, he famously performed a lap of honor, continuing to jump hurdles even after the race had concluded. He missed the 1976 Olympics and a showdown with United States rival Edwin Moses because of the boycott by Uganda and other African nations. The boycott was a significant blow to Akii-Bua’s career; as the defending champion and team captain, he had already arrived in the Olympic Village in Montreal when Amin ordered the team to return home. He was forced to leave on the day of the 400m hurdles final, missing what experts predicted would be his career-defining showdown with American rival Edwin Moses.

As a police officer, Akii-Bua was promoted by Ugandan president Idi Amin and given a house as a reward for his athletic prowess. When the Amin regime was collapsing, he fled to Kenya with his family, fearful that he would be seen as a collaborator; this was more likely because he was a member of the Langi tribe, many of whom were persecuted by Amin, whereas Akii-Bua was cited by Amin as an example of a Langi who was doing well. Despite being used as a propaganda tool to signal tribal unity, Akii-Bua faced significant personal danger; three of his brothers were killed by Amin’s state security forces. While he was promoted to Senior Superintendent of Police, he was frequently denied permission to compete internationally, effectively grounding his career during his athletic prime. The Amin regime’s impact on Akii-Bua’s career went beyond direct physical threats. Despite the "Golden Age" of Ugandan athletics—where the police and army provided professional coaching—Amin's increasing paranoia led to a "house arrest" style of existence for Akii-Bua. He was often denied the necessary exit visas to compete in the lucrative European circuit, preventing him from gaining the tactical experience and financial security enjoyed by his rivals. However, in Kenya he was put into a refugee camp. From there, he was freed by his shoe-manufacturer Puma and lived in Germany working for Puma for 3–4 years. He represented Uganda once again at the 1980 Summer Olympics. Later he returned to Uganda and became a coach. His escape from Uganda in 1979 involved a perilous car journey through roadblocks, eventually tailing a West German diplomatic convoy to the Kenyan border. During the flight, his wife gave birth prematurely to a child who did not survive. Upon his final return to Uganda in 1983, he found his home looted and his legacy marginalized. He famously remarked to anti-corruption officers that he had "no wealth to declare, only poverty." After the fall of Amin in 1979, the institutional support for athletics in Uganda collapsed. Many of the facilities built during the 1970s fell into disrepair, and government funding was drastically reduced. Akii-Bua struggled to compete in the 1980 Moscow Olympics and the 1984 Los Angeles Olympics, as he was well past his athletic prime and lacked the conditioning support required for elite performance. He remained a police officer until his death, though he never received another promotion after his initial reward in 1972.

Akii-Bua died a widower, at the age of 47, survived by eleven children. He was given a state funeral. His nephew is international footballer David Obua, and his brother Lawrence Ogwang competed in the long jump and triple jump at the 1956 Olympics.

The phrase "akii-buas" has come to colloquially mean "runs" in Uganda.

Sporting positions
Preceded by (United States) Ralph Mann	Men's 400 m Hurdles Best Year Performance; 1972–1973	Succeeded by (United States) Jim Bolding
