= Roger Johnson (hurdler) =

New Zealand hurdler (born 1943)

Roger Vivian Johnson (born 10 December 1943) is a record-holding 400-metre hurdler who represented New Zealand in the 1968 (Mexico City) and 1972 (Munich) Olympic Games. He also represented New Zealand in the 1966 (Kingston), 1970 (Edinburgh), and 1974 (Christchurch) Commonwealth Games.

Johnson's fastest 400-metre hurdle time of 49.7 was set on 15 April 1972 in Los Angeles. This held the New Zealand record for 42 years, until it was broken by Michael Cochrane in 2014.

Johnson was co-captain of the NCAA Champion UCLA track team in 1967. (alongside Ron Copeland and Tom Jones)

Born in Dunedin, New Zealand, Johnson is the son of Ossie Johnson and Lorna Waddell, also successful athletes (triple-jump and swimming, respectively).

Date	Competition	Country	Cat.	Type	Nr.	Place	Result	Score
15 April 1972	Los Angeles	USA		F		2	49.7h	1132
31 August 1972	Munich Olympic Games	GER		H	5	4	50.48	1102
13 October 1968	Mexico City Olympic Games	MEX	OW	H	2	2	51.39	1059
1 December 1973	Christchurch	NZL		F		1	51.4h	1052
14 October 1968	Mexico City Olympic Games	MEX	OW	SF	2	7	51.87	1037

In addition to being an accomplished athlete, Johnson is well respected in the field of operations management. After receiving his PhD from the Graduate School of Management at UCLA in 1973, Johnson joined the faculty of the University of Otago in New Zealand, and was promoted to the dean of commerce from 1976 to 1979. In 1980, Johnson went on to be an associate professor at the UCLA Anderson School of Business, and an associate professor of operations management at the University of Michigan School of Business Administration. His research interests include assembly-line balancing and management, project management, branch-and-bound methods, facility layout, and flexible manufacturing systems. Johnson's work has been published in Management Science, Decision Sciences, and the International Journal of Production Research.

Johnson retired to live in Scotland.
