= Ralph Mann =

American sprinter and hurdler (1949–2025)

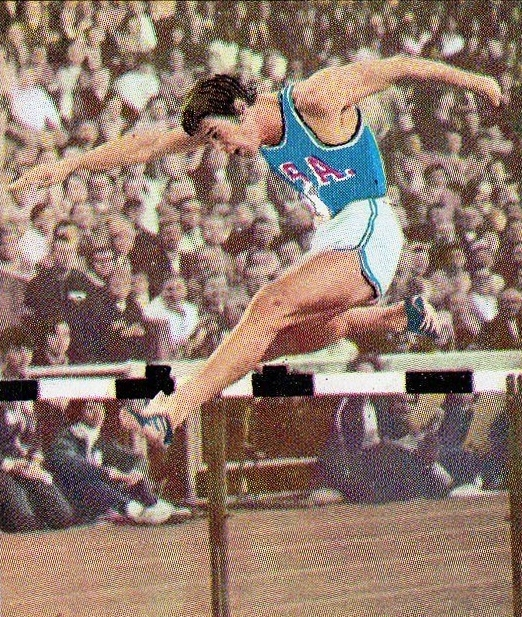
- Mann competing at the 1972 Summer Olympics

Personal information
- Born: Ralph Vernon Mann; June 16, 1949 Long Beach, California, U.S.
- Died: January 2, 2025 (aged 75)
- Education: Carson
- Height: 193 cm (6 ft 4 in)
- Weight: 86 kg (190 lb)

Sport
- Sport: Track and field / Athletics
- Event(s): Sprint, hurdles
- University team: Brigham Young University Cougars
- Club: Southern California Striders

Achievements and titles
- Personal best(s): 440 y – 46.6 (1970); 120 yH – 13.9 (1968); 400 mH – 48.51 (1972)
Medal record
Representing the United States
Olympic Games
Silver medal – second place	1972 Munich	400 m hurdles
Pan American Games
Gold medal – first place	1971 Cali	400 m hurdles
Silver medal – second place	1975 Mexico City	400 m hurdles

Ralph Vernon Mann (June 16, 1949 – January 2, 2025) was an American sprinter and hurdler. He was an undergraduate at Brigham Young University, and later earned a Ph.D. in Biomechanics from Washington State University.

== Career ==
In 1969, Mann won his first NCAA 440 yard hurdles championship with a time of 49.6 seconds. Tying the NCAA and American records, the time was three-tenths of a second off the world record. A year later in Des Moines, Iowa, Mann captured his second NCAA championship and set a new world-record time of 48.8 seconds for the 440 yards hurdles. During his collegiate career, Ralph was NCAA champion three times. He was a three-time All-American, and in 1970 was second in the voting for the Sullivan Award.

In 1971, Mann won gold in the 400m hurdles at the Pan-American Games. He competed in the 400m hurdles at the 1972 Olympics and won the silver medal. His winning time of 48.4 seconds at the United States Olympic Trials that year was credited as a best mark for the event at sea level (the then world record was 48.1 s set at altitude). In 1975, Mann won silver at the Pan-American Games. Ralph was also a four-time AAU champion - 1969–71 and 1975. In 1976, Mann attempted to qualify for the Olympics again but came sixth and therefore outside the top 3 qualifiers.

== Later life and death ==
Mann taught and researched at the University of Kentucky. He also consulted for USA Track & Field. Mann co-wrote the book Swing Like a Pro: The Breakthrough Scientific Method of Perfecting Your Golf Swing with Fred Griffin. This book was the culmination of Mann's expertise in the field of biomechanics and Griffin's experience of teaching golf as a PGA Professional. He also co-authored with Amber Murphy (his daughter) the book The mechanics of Sprinting and Hurdling. Mann's son Randall is a poet and literary critic. Mann died on January 2, 2025, at the age of 75.

== Awards and accolades ==
Mann received the AAU's DiBenedetto Award for the single most outstanding career, most notably for his Olympic silver medal. In 2015, he was inducted into the USA National Track and Field Hall of Fame. In 2019, Mann was inducted into the inaugural Carson High School Hall of fame.

== Rankings ==
Mann was ranked among the best in the US and the world in the 400 m hurdles from 1969 to 1976, according to the votes of the experts of Track and Field News.

400 meters hurdles
Year	World rank	US rank
1969	4th	2nd
1970	2nd	1st
1971	1st	1st
1972	2nd	1st
1973	4th	2nd
1974	3rd	2nd
1975	4th	2nd
1976	9th	6th

Sporting positions
Preceded by Unknown	Men's 400m Hurdles Best Year Performance; 1971	Succeeded by (Uganda) John Akii-Bua
