= Athletics at the 1973 Summer Universiade – Men's 100 metres =

The men's 100 metres event at the 1973 Summer Universiade was held at the Central Lenin Stadium in Moscow on 16 and 17 August.

== Medalists ==
Gold	Silver	Bronze
Juris Silovs; Soviet Union	Silvio Leonard; Cuba	Pietro Mennea; Italy

== Results ==
=== Heats ===
Held on 16 August

Wind:
Heat 2: +0.3 m/s, Heat 6: 0.0 m/s

Rank	Heat	Athlete	Nationality	Time	Notes
1	1	Lajos Grésa	Hungary	10.47	Q
2	1	Thomas Whatley	United States	10.51	Q
3	1	Takao Ishizawa	Japan	10.57	q
4	1	Bernd Borth	East Germany	10.67	q
5	1	Guillermo González	Puerto Rico	10.76	
6	1	Andrzej Świerczyński	Poland	10.78	
7	1	Mohamed Hamad Al-Sultan	Kuwait	11.68	
1	2	Vladimir Atamas	Soviet Union	10.53	Q
2	2	Silvio Leonard	Cuba	10.59	Q
3	2	Tetsumi Shintai	Japan	10.76	
4	2	Reto Diezi	Switzerland	10.78	
5	2	Selendorj Oimandahk	Mongolia	11.06	
6	2	Said Marvez Mir	Pakistan	11.52	
7	2	Seidou Mama Gao	Benin	11.6	
1	3	Juris Silovs	Soviet Union	10.53	Q
2	3	Pablo Montes	Cuba	10.66	Q
3	3	Jean-Pierre Grès	France	10.77	
4	3	Wolfgang Rabe	East Germany	10.80	
5	3	Ferdinand Geeroms	Belgium	11.00	
6	3	Georg Regner	Austria	11.05	
7	3	Byambajavyn Enkhbaatar	Mongolia	11.1	
8	3	Joseph Woods	Malta	12.01	
1	4	Klaus Ehl	West Germany	10.66	Q
2	4	Steve Riddick	United States	10.70	Q
3	4	Vincenzo Guerini	Italy	10.87	
4	4	Toma Petrescu	Romania	10.90	
5	4	Alphonse Yanghat	Congo	11.07	
6	4	Agustín Pérez	Spain	11.15	
7	4	Eduardo González	Mexico	11.51	
1	5	Jerzy Homziuk	Poland	10.83	Q
2	5	Günther Wessing	West Germany	10.87	Q
3	5	Jorge Vizcarrondo	Puerto Rico	10.88	
4	5	Lambert Micha	Belgium	10.89	
5	5	Gheorghe Dulgheru	Romania	11.0	
6	5	Pedro Hernández	Spain	11.27	
7	5	Younis Abdallah Rabee	Kuwait	11.41	
1	6	Pietro Mennea	Italy	10.55	Q
2	6	Chris Monk	Great Britain	10.60	Q
3	6	René Metz	France	10.76	q, 0.0
4	6	Andrew Ratcliffe	Australia	10.92	
5	6	Günther Würfel	Austria	11.01	
6	6	Sam Musoke	Uganda	11.33	
7	6	Yussif Issa Al-Hasawi	Kuwait	11.36	

=== Semifinals ===
Held on 17 August

Wind:
Heat 1: ? m/s, Heat 2: +2.0 m/s

Rank	Heat	Athlete	Nationality	Time	Notes
1	2	Juris Silovs	Soviet Union	10.33	Q
2	2	Lajos Grésa	Hungary	10.44	Q
3	2	Silvio Leonard	Cuba	10.52	Q
4	2	Steve Riddick	United States	10.55	q
5	1	Vladimir Atamas	Soviet Union	10.58	Q
6	1	Pablo Montes	Cuba	10.58	Q
7	1	Pietro Mennea	Italy	10.59	Q
8	2	Takao Ishizawa	Japan	10.61	q
9	1	Thomas Whatley	United States	10.63	
10	1	Chris Monk	Great Britain	10.64	
11	1	Klaus Ehl	West Germany	10.66	
12	2	René Metz	France	10.71	
13	2	Bernd Borth	East Germany	10.71	
14	1	Tetsumi Shintai	Japan	10.78	
15	2	Günther Wessing	West Germany	10.79	
16	1	Jerzy Homziuk	Poland	10.88	

=== Final ===
Held on 17 August

Wind: 0.0 m/s

Rank	Athlete	Nationality	Time	Notes
1st place, gold medalist(s)	Juris Silovs	Soviet Union	10.37	
2nd place, silver medalist(s)	Silvio Leonard	Cuba	10.43	
3rd place, bronze medalist(s)	Pietro Mennea	Italy	10.48	
4	Steve Riddick	United States	10.53	
5	Vladimir Atamas	Soviet Union	10.55	
6	Pablo Montes	Cuba	10.59	
7	Lajos Grésa	Hungary	10.61	
8	Takao Ishizawa	Japan	10.68	
