= Athletics at the 1973 Summer Universiade – Men's 4 × 100 metres relay =

The men's 4 × 100 metres relay event at the 1973 Summer Universiade was held at the Central Lenin Stadium in Moscow on 19 and 20 August.

== Results ==
=== Heats ===
Rank	Heat	Nation	Athletes	Time	Notes
1	1	United States	Thomas Whatley, Wardell Gilbreath, Larry Brown, Steve Riddick	39.63	Q
2	1	Poland		40.4	Q
3	1	East Germany		40.4	q
4	1	Japan		40.9	
5	1	Belgium		41.0	
1	2	West Germany		39.9	Q
2	2	Italy	Vincenzo Guerini, Luigi Benedetti, Sergio Morselli, Pietro Mennea	40.1	Q
3	2	Cuba		40.4	q
4	2	Kuwait		43.7	
	2	Romania		DNF	
1	3	Soviet Union	Aleksandr Zhidkikh, Vladimir Lovetskiy, Juris Silovs, Vladimir Atamas	39.63	Q
2	3	France	Philippe Leroux, Marc Davidovici, Charles Ducasse, Jean-Pierre Grès	39.98	Q
3	3	Great Britain		40.7	
4	3	Mongolia		42.6	
	3	Puerto Rico		DNF	

=== Final ===
Rank	Nation	Athletes	Time	Notes
1st place, gold medalist(s)	United States	Thomas Whatley, Wardell Gilbreath, Larry Brown, Steve Riddick	39.10	UR
2nd place, silver medalist(s)	Soviet Union	Aleksandr Zhidkikh, Vladimir Lovetskiy, Juris Silovs, Vladimir Atamas	39.46	
3rd place, bronze medalist(s)	Italy	Vincenzo Guerini, Luigi Benedetti, Sergio Morselli, Pietro Mennea	39.55	
4	France	Philippe Leroux, Marc Davidovici, Charles Ducasse, Jean-Pierre Grès	39.83	
5	West Germany	Klaus-Dieter Bieler, Günther Wessing, Uwe Schläfer, Klaus Ehl	39.91	
6	Poland		40.3	
7	East Germany	Thomas Munkelt, Bernd Borth, Wolfgang Rabe, Raimund Bethge	40.61	
	Cuba		DNF	
