= Athletics at the 1972 Summer Olympics =

Coordinates: 48.1731°N 11.5467°E

Athletics at the Games of the XX Olympiad
- No. of events: 38
- Competitors: 1,324 from 104 nations

At the 1972 Summer Olympics in Munich, 38 events in athletics were contested, 24 for men and 14 for women. There were a total number of 1324 participating athletes from 104 countries.

== Medal summary ==
=== Men ===
Event	Gold		Silver		Bronze	
100 metres	Valeriy Borzov; Soviet Union	10.14	Robert Taylor; United States	10.24	Lennox Miller; Jamaica	10.33
200 metres	Valeriy Borzov; Soviet Union	20.00	Larry Black; United States	20.19	Pietro Mennea; Italy	20.30
400 metres	Vincent Matthews; United States	44.66	Wayne Collett; United States	44.80	Julius Sang; Kenya	44.92
800 metres	Dave Wottle; United States	1:45.86	Yevhen Arzhanov; Soviet Union	1:45.89	Mike Boit; Kenya	1:46.01
1500 metres	Pekka Vasala; Finland	3:36.33	Kipchoge Keino; Kenya	3:36.81	Rod Dixon; New Zealand	3:37.46
5000 metres	Lasse Virén; Finland	13:26.42 (OR)	Mohammed Gammoudi; Tunisia	13:27.33	Ian Stewart; Great Britain	13:27.61
10,000 metres	Lasse Virén; Finland	27:38.35 (WR)	Emiel Puttemans; Belgium	27:39.58	Miruts Yifter; Ethiopia	27:40.96
110 metres hurdles	Rod Milburn; United States	13.24 (WR)	Guy Drut; France	13.34	Thomas Hill; United States	13.48
400 metres hurdles	John Akii-Bua; Uganda	47.82 (WR)	Ralph Mann; United States	48.51	David Hemery; Great Britain	48.52
3000 metres steeplechase	Kipchoge Keino; Kenya	8:23.64 (OR)	Ben Jipcho; Kenya	8:24.62	Tapio Kantanen; Finland	8:24.66
4 × 100 metres relay	United States; Larry Black; Robert Taylor; Gerald Tinker; Eddie Hart	38.19 (WR)	Soviet Union; Aleksandr Kornelyuk; Vladimir Lovetskiy; Juris Silovs; Valeriy Borzov	38.50	West Germany; Jobst Hirscht; Karlheinz Klotz; Gerhard Wucherer; Klaus Ehl	38.79
4 × 400 metres relay	Kenya; Charles Asati; Munyoro Nyamau; Robert Ouko; Julius Sang	2:59.83	Great Britain; Martin Reynolds; Alan Pascoe; David Hemery; David Jenkins	3:00.46	France; Gilles Bertould; Daniel Velasques; Francis Kerbiriou; Jacques Carette	3:00.65
Marathon	Frank Shorter; United States	2:12:19.8	Karel Lismont; Belgium	2:14:31.8	Mamo Wolde; Ethiopia	2:15:08.4
20 kilometres walk	Peter Frenkel; East Germany	1:26:42.4 (OR)	Volodymyr Holubnychy; Soviet Union	1:26:55.2	Hans-Georg Reimann; East Germany	1:27:16.6
50 kilometres walk	Bernd Kannenberg; West Germany	3:56:11.6 (OR)	Veniamin Soldatenko; Soviet Union	3:58:24.0	Larry Young; United States	4:00:46.0
High jump	Jüri Tarmak; Soviet Union	2.23 m	Stefan Junge; East Germany	2.21 m	Dwight Stones; United States	2.21 m
Pole vault	Wolfgang Nordwig; East Germany	5.50 m (OR)	Bob Seagren; United States	5.40 m	Jan Johnson; United States	5.35 m
Long jump	Randy Williams; United States	8.24 m	Hans Baumgartner; West Germany	8.18 m	Arnie Robinson; United States	8.03 m
Triple jump	Viktor Saneyev; Soviet Union	17.35 m	Jörg Drehmel; East Germany	17.31 m	Nelson Prudêncio; Brazil	17.05 m
Shot put	Władysław Komar; Poland	21.18 m (OR)	George Woods; United States	21.17 m	Hartmut Briesenick; East Germany	21.14 m
Discus throw	Ludvík Daněk; Czechoslovakia	64.40 m	Jay Silvester; United States	63.50 m	Ricky Bruch; Sweden	63.40 m
Hammer throw	Anatolij Bondarčuk; Soviet Union	75.50 m (OR)	Jochen Sachse; East Germany	74.96 m	Vasiliy Khmelevskiy; Soviet Union	74.04 m
Javelin throw	Klaus Wolfermann; West Germany	90.48 m (OR)	Jānis Lūsis; Soviet Union	90.46 m	Bill Schmidt; United States	84.42 m
Decathlon	Mykola Avilov; Soviet Union	8454 pts (WR)	Leonid Lytvynenko; Soviet Union	8035 pts	Ryszard Katus; Poland	7984 pts

=== Women ===
Games	Gold		Silver		Bronze	
100 metres	Renate Stecher; East Germany	11.07 (WR)	Raelene Boyle; Australia	11.23	Silvia Chivás; Cuba	11.24
200 metres	Renate Stecher; East Germany	22.40 (=WR)	Raelene Boyle; Australia	22.45	Irena Szewińska; Poland	22.74
400 metres	Monika Zehrt; East Germany	51.08	Rita Wilden; West Germany	51.21	Kathy Hammond; United States	51.64
800 metres	Hildegard Falck; West Germany	1:58.55 (OR)	Nijolė Sabaitė; Soviet Union	1:58.65	Gunhild Hoffmeister; East Germany	1:59.19
1500 metres	Lyudmila Bragina; Soviet Union	4:01.38 (WR)	Gunhild Hoffmeister; East Germany	4:02.83	Paola Pigni; Italy	4:02.85
100 metres hurdles	Annelie Ehrhardt; East Germany	12.59 (WR)	Valeria Bufanu; Romania	12.84	Karin Balzer; East Germany	12.90
4 × 100 metres relay	West Germany; Christiane Krause; Ingrid Becker; Annegret Richter; Heide Rosendahl	42.81 (WR)	East Germany; Evelin Kaufer; Christina Heinich; Bärbel Struppert; Renate Stecher	42.95	Cuba; Marlene Elejarde; Carmen Valdés; Fulgencia Romay; Silvia Chivás	43.36
4 × 400 metres relay	East Germany; Dagmar Käsling; Rita Kühne; Helga Seidler; Monika Zehrt	3:22.95 (WR)	United States; Mable Fergerson; Madeline Manning; Cheryl Toussaint; Kathy Hammond	3:25.15	West Germany; Anette Rückes; Inge Bödding; Hildegard Falck; Rita Wilden	3:26.51
High jump	Ulrike Meyfarth; West Germany	1.92 m (=WR)	Yordanka Blagoeva; Bulgaria	1.88 m	Ilona Gusenbauer; Austria	1.88 m
Long jump	Heide Rosendahl; West Germany	6.78 m	Diana Yorgova; Bulgaria	6.77 m	Eva Šuranová; Czechoslovakia	6.67 m
Shot put	Nadezhda Chizhova; Soviet Union	21.03 m (WR)	Margitta Gummel; East Germany	20.22 m	Ivanka Khristova; Bulgaria	19.35 m
Discus throw	Faina Melnik; Soviet Union	66.62 m (OR)	Argentina Menis; Romania	65.06 m	Vasilka Stoeva; Bulgaria	64.34 m
Javelin throw	Ruth Fuchs; East Germany	63.88 m (OR)	Jacqueline Todten; East Germany	62.54 m	Kate Schmidt; United States	59.94 m
Pentathlon	Mary Peters; Great Britain	4801 pts (WR)	Heide Rosendahl; West Germany	4791 pts	Burglinde Pollak; East Germany	4768 pts

== Medal table ==
Rank	Nation	Gold	Silver	Bronze	Total
1	Soviet Union	9	7	1	17
2	East Germany	8	7	5	20
3	United States	6	8	8	22
4	West Germany	6	3	2	11
5	Finland	3	0	1	4
6	Kenya	2	2	2	6
7	Great Britain	1	1	2	4
8	Poland	1	0	2	3
9	Czechoslovakia	1	0	1	2
10	Uganda	1	0	0	1
11	Bulgaria	0	2	2	4
12	Australia	0	2	0	2
12	Belgium	0	2	0	2
12	Romania	0	2	0	2
15	France	0	1	1	2
16	Tunisia	0	1	0	1
17	Cuba	0	0	2	2
17	Ethiopia	0	0	2	2
17	Italy	0	0	2	2
20	Austria	0	0	1	1
20	Brazil	0	0	1	1
20	Jamaica	0	0	1	1
20	New Zealand	0	0	1	1
20	Sweden	0	0	1	1
Totals (24 entries)		38	38	38	114
