= Athletics at the 1973 Summer Universiade – Men's 4 × 400 metres relay =

Men's 4×400 metres relay event

The men's 4 × 400 metres relay event at the 1973 Summer Universiade was held at the Central Lenin Stadium in Moscow on 19 and 20 August.

== Results ==
=== Heats ===
Rank	Heat	Nation	Athletes	Time	Notes
1	1	Soviet Union	Leonid Korolyov, Valeriy Yurchenko, Valeriy Yudin, Semyon Kocher	3:06.75	Q
2	1	United States	Mark Lutz, Darwin Bond, Ron Jenkins, Dennis Schultz	3:06.92	Q
3	1	France	Gilles Bertould, Patrick Salvador, Pierre Bonvin, Lionel Malingre	3:10.80	Q
4	1	Poland		3:11.2	q
5	1	Kuwait		3:23.7	
1	2	Great Britain		3:10.0	Q
2	2	West Germany		3:10.8	Q
3	2	Italy	Daniele Giovanardi, Claudio Trachello, Giacomo Puosi, Pasqualino Abeti	3:12.2	Q
4	2	Puerto Rico		3:16.67	q

=== Final ===
Rank	Nation	Athletes	Time	Notes
1st place, gold medalist(s)	United States	Mark Lutz, Darwin Bond, Ron Jenkins, Dennis Schultz	3:04.40	
2nd place, silver medalist(s)	Great Britain	David Jenkins, Joe Chivers, Stephen Black, Stewart McCallum	3:05.38	
3rd place, bronze medalist(s)	West Germany	Franz-Josef Gleen, Siegfried Götz, Wolfgang Druschky, Bernd Herrmann	3:06.11	
4	France	Gilles Bertould, Patrick Salvador, Pierre Bonvin, Lionel Malingre	3:06.54	
5	Poland		3:07.56	
6	Italy	Daniele Giovanardi, Claudio Trachello, Giacomo Puosi, Pasqualino Abeti	3:09.17	
	Soviet Union	Leonid Korolyov, Valeriy Yurchenko, Valeriy Yudin, Semyon Kocher	DQ	(Note: The Soviet team originally won in 3:03.8 but was disqualified)
	Puerto Rico		DNS	
