= Athletics at the 1973 Summer Universiade – Men's 400 metres =

The men's 400 metres event at the 1973 Summer Universiade was held at the Central Lenin Stadium in Moscow on 16, 17 and 18 August.

== Medalists ==
| Gold | Silver | Bronze |
|---|---|---|
| Alberto Juantorena; Cuba | Semyon Kocher; Soviet Union | David Jenkins; Great Britain |

== Results ==
=== Heats ===
| Rank | Heat | Athlete | Nationality | Time | Notes |
|---|---|---|---|---|---|
| 1 | 1 | Valeriy Yurchenko | Soviet Union | 47.30 | Q |
| 2 | 1 | Pasqualino Abeti | Italy | 49.6 | Q |
| 3 | 1 | Abbas Hassan Ahmed | Kuwait | 50.5 | |
| 4 | 1 | Ikaka Cheya | Sudan | 53.4 | |
| 1 | 2 | Joe Chivers | Great Britain | 48.12 | Q |
| 2 | 2 | Claudio Trachello | Italy | 48.26 | Q |
| 3 | 2 | Stig Lönnquist | Finland | 48.6 | |
| 4 | 2 | Ruvuna Francis | Uganda | 49.7 | |
| 5 | 2 | Carlos Abbott | Costa Rica | 50.5 | |
| 6 | 2 | Hassan Radhi Makki | Kuwait | 50.9 | |
| 7 | 2 | Ahmed Javed | Pakistan | 54.1 | |
| 1 | 3 | Semyon Kocher | Soviet Union | 47.23 | Q |
| 2 | 3 | Pedro Ferrer | Puerto Rico | 47.46 | Q |
| 3 | 3 | Lech Chludziński | Poland | 47.94 | q |
| 4 | 3 | Siegfried Götz | West Germany | 49.18 | |
| 5 | 3 | Emmanuil Wellington | Ghana | 49.5 | |
| 6 | 3 | Mohamed Hassan | Iraq | 49.7 | |
| | 3 | Romain Roels | Belgium | DNF | |
| 1 | 4 | Dennis Schultz | United States | 47.88 | Q |
| 2 | 4 | Constantin Stan | Romania | 48.10 | Q |
| 3 | 4 | Iván Mangual | Puerto Rico | 48.59 | q |
| 4 | 4 | Julius Sang | Kenya | 49.12 | |
| 5 | 4 | David Steyskal | Czechoslovakia | 49.7 | |
| 6 | 4 | Houshemy Yar Arshadi | Iran | 50.6 | |
| 1 | 5 | Ivan Daniš | Czechoslovakia | 47.88 | Q |
| 2 | 5 | Milorad Čikić | Yugoslavia | 48.6 | Q |
| 3 | 5 | Susumu Shimizu | Japan | 49.3 | |
| 4 | 5 | Ahmad Lotfabady | Iran | 50.2 | |
| 5 | 5 | Ahmed El-Werdaney | Egypt | 53.4 | |
| 6 | 5 | Sékou Barry | Guinea | 56.1 | |
| 1 | 6 | Alberto Juantorena | Cuba | 47.01 | Q |
| 2 | 6 | David Jenkins | Great Britain | 47.05 | Q |
| 3 | 6 | Darwin Bond | United States | 47.25 | q |
| 4 | 6 | Wolfgang Druschky | West Germany | 48.29 | q |
| 5 | 6 | Alphonse Mandonda | Congo | 48.8 | |
| 6 | 6 | José Antônio Rabaca | Brazil | 50.5 | |
| 7 | 6 | Dangaajav Battulga | Mongolia | 53.02 | |

=== Semifinals ===
| Rank | Heat | Athlete | Nationality | Time | Notes |
|---|---|---|---|---|---|
| 1 | 1 | David Jenkins | Great Britain | 46.1 | Q |
| 2 | 1 | Dennis Schultz | United States | 46.4 | Q |
| 3 | 1 | Semyon Kocher | Soviet Union | 46.7 | Q |
| 4 | 1 | Milorad Čikić | Yugoslavia | 46.8 | Q |
| 5 | 1 | Lech Chludziński | Poland | 47.6 | |
| 6 | 1 | Iván Mangual | Puerto Rico | 48.1 | |
| 7 | 1 | Constantin Stan | Romania | 48.1 | |
| | 1 | Claudio Trachello | Italy | DNS | |
| 1 | 2 | Alberto Juantorena | Cuba | 46.3 | Q |
| 2 | 2 | Pedro Ferrer | Puerto Rico | 46.6 | Q |
| 3 | 2 | Ivan Daniš | Czechoslovakia | 46.6 | Q |
| 4 | 2 | Darwin Bond | United States | 46.7 | Q |
| 5 | 2 | Valeriy Yurchenko | Soviet Union | 46.9 | |
| 6 | 2 | Pasqualino Abeti | Italy | 47.6 | |
| 7 | 2 | Wolfgang Druschky | West Germany | 47.7 | |
| 8 | 2 | Joe Chivers | Great Britain | 47.9 | |

=== Final ===
| Rank | Athlete | Nationality | Time | Notes |
|---|---|---|---|---|
| 1st place, gold medalist(s) | Alberto Juantorena | Cuba | 45.36 | |
| 2nd place, silver medalist(s) | Semyon Kocher | Soviet Union | 46.32 | |
| 3rd place, bronze medalist(s) | David Jenkins | Great Britain | 46.39 | |
| 4 | Dennis Schultz | United States | 46.40 | |
| 5 | Darwin Bond | United States | 46.71 | |
| 6 | Pedro Ferrer | Puerto Rico | 46.76 | |
| 7 | Ivan Daniš | Czechoslovakia | 47.18 | |
| 8 | Milorad Čikić | Yugoslavia | 47.35 | |
