= Athletics at the 1972 Summer Olympics – Men's 4 × 100 metres relay =

Men's 4 × 100 metres relay at the Games of the XX Olympiad
- Venue: Olympic Stadium
- Dates: 9 September & 10 September 1972
- Competitors: 128 from 27 nations

Medalists
1st place, gold medalist(s)		Larry Black, Robert Taylor, Gerald Tinker, Eddie Hart	United States
2nd place, silver medalist(s)		Aleksandr Kornelyuk, Vladimir Lovetskiy, Juris Silovs, Valeriy Borzov	Soviet Union
3rd place, bronze medalist(s)		Jobst Hirscht, Karlheinz Klotz, Gerhard Wucherer, Klaus Ehl	West Germany

The men's 4 × 100 metres relay was held on 9 and 10 September 1972.

== Heats ==
The top four teams in each of the four heats advanced to the semifinal round.

=== Heat one ===
Rank	Names	Nationality	Time
1	Aleksandr Kornelyuk, Vladimir Lovetskiy, Juris Silovs, Valeriy Borzov	Soviet Union	39.15
2	Jobst Hirscht, Karlheinz Klotz, Gerhard Wucherer, Klaus Ehl	West Germany	39.17
3	Manfred Kokot, Bernd Borth, Hans-Jürgen Bombach, Siegfried Schenke	East Germany	39.17
4	Georg Regner, Axel Nepraunik, Gert Nöster, Helmut Lang	Austria	40.49
5	Luis Alers, Guillermo González, Pedro Ferrer, Jorge Vizcarrondo	Puerto Rico	41.34
6	Mohamed Jaman Al-Dosari, Mansour Al-Juaid, Bilal Said Al-Azma, Said Khalil Al-Dosari	Saudi Arabia	43.35
-	Muhammad Younis, Norman Brinkworth, Muhammad Siddiq, Nusrat Iqbal Sahi	Pakistan	DNS
-	Abdulazeez Abdulkareem, Malik Murdhi, Mohamed Mubarak, Younis Abdallah Rabee	Kuwait	DNS

=== Heat two ===
Rank	Names	Nationality	Time
1	Patrick Bourbeillon, Jean-Pierre Grès, Gérard Fenouil, René Metz	France	39.01
2	Jaroslav Matoušek, Juraj Demeč, Jiří Kynos, Luděk Bohman	Czechoslovakia	39.31
3	Rex Bazunu, James Olakunle, Benedict Majekodunmi, Kola Abdulai	Nigeria	39.66
4	Humberto Galea, Félix Mata, Alberto Marchán, Jesús Rico	Venezuela	39.74
5	Kouakou Komenan, Amadou Meïté, Kouami N’Dri, Gaoussou Koné	Ivory Coast	39.81
6	Jean-Louis Ravelomanantsoa, Alfred Rabenja, André Ralainasolo, Henri Rafaralahy	Madagascar	40.58
7	Lee Chung-ping, Su Wen-ho, Chen Chin-long, Chen Ming-chi	Republic of China	41.78
-	Andrew Sartee, Thomas O'Brien Howe, Dominic Saidu, Thomas N'Ma or Nma	Liberia	DNS

=== Heat three ===
Rank	Names	Nationality	Time
1	Stanisław Wagner, Tadeusz Cuch, Jerzy Czerbniak, Zenon Nowosz	Poland	39.11
2	Ohene Karikari, James Addy, Sandy Osei-Agyemang, George Daniels	Ghana	39.46
3	Antti Rajamäki, Raimo Vilén, Erik Gustafsson, Markku Juhola	Finland	39.54
4	José Triana, Juan Morales, Hermes Ramírez, Pablo Montes	Cuba	39.65
5	Malang Mané, Christian Dorosario, Momar N’Dao, Barka Sy	Senegal	40.95
6	Somsakdi Boontud, Surapong Ariyamongkol, Panus Ariyamongkol, Anat Ratanapol	Thailand	41.04
-	Michael Fray, Donald Quarrie, Lennox Miller, Horace Levy	Jamaica	DNS
-	Ainsely Armstrong, Rudolph Reid, Bertram Lovell, Hasely Crawford	Trinidad and Tobago	DNS

=== Heat four ===
Rank	Names	Nationality	Time
1	Larry Black, Robert Taylor, Gerald Tinker, Eddie Hart	United States	38.96
2	Vincenzo Guerini, Ennio Preatoni, Luigi Benedetti, Pietro Mennea	Italy	39.29
3	Berwyn Price, Don Halliday, Dave Dear, Brian Green	Great Britain	39.63
4	Antoine Nkounkou, Louis Nkanza, Jean-Pierre Bassegela, Théophile Nkounkou	Republic of the Congo	39.86
5	Danny Smith, Harry Lockhart, Walter Callander, Mike Sands	Bahamas	40.48
6	Obedi Mwanga, Norman Chihota, Claver Kamanya, Hamad Ndee	Tanzania	41.07
-	Sisaye Feleke, Solomon Belay, Kebede Bedasso, Egzi-Gebre-Gebre	Ethiopia	DNF
-	José Luis Sánchez Paraíso, Manuel Carballo, Francisco García, Luis Sarría	Spain	DNF

== Semifinals ==
The top four teams in each of the two heats advanced to the final.

Heat one

Rank	Names	Nationality	Time
1	Larry Black, Robert Taylor, Gerald Tinker, Eddie Hart	United States	38.54
2	Jobst Hirscht, Karlheinz Klotz, Gerhard Wucherer, Klaus Ehl	West Germany	38.86
3	Stanisław Wagner, Tadeusz Cuch, Jerzy Czerbniak, Zenon Nowosz	Poland	38.90
4	Jaroslav Matoušek, Juraj Demeč, Jiří Kynos, Luděk Bohman	Czechoslovakia	39.01
5	José Triana, Juan Morales, Hermes Ramírez, Pablo Montes	Cuba	39.04
6	Kola Abdulai, Rex Bazunu, James Olakunle, Timon Oyebami	Nigeria	39.73
7	Ohene Karikari, James Addy, Sandy Osei-Agyemang, George Daniels	Ghana	39.99
-	Georg Regner, Axel Nepraunik, Günther Würfel, Helmut Lang	Austria	DQ

Heat two

Rank	Names	Nationality	Time
1	Patrick Bourbeillon, Jean-Pierre Grès, Gérard Fenouil, Bruno Cherrier	France	39.00
2	Aleksandr Kornelyuk, Vladimir Lovetsky, Juris Silovs, Valeriy Borzov	Soviet Union	39.00
3	Manfred Kokot, Bernd Borth, Hans-Jürgen Bombach, Siegfried Schenke	East Germany	39.06
4	Vincenzo Guerini, Ennio Preatoni, Luigi Benedetti, Pietro Mennea	Italy	39.21
5	Antti Rajamäki, Raimo Vilén, Erik Gustafsson, Markku Juhola	Finland	39.30
6	Les Piggot, Don Halliday, Dave Dear, Brian Green	Great Britain	39.47
7	Humberto Galea, Félix Mata, Alberto Marchán, Jesús Rico	Venezuela	39.74
8	Antoine Nkounkou, Louis Nkanza, Jean-Pierre Bassegela, Théophile Nkounkou	Republic of the Congo	39.97

== Final ==
Rank	Names	Nationality	Time	Notes
1st place, gold medalist(s)	Larry Black, Robert Taylor, Gerald Tinker, Eddie Hart	United States	38.19	WR
2nd place, silver medalist(s)	Aleksandr Kornelyuk, Vladimir Lovetsky, Juris Silovs, Valeriy Borzov	Soviet Union	38.50	
3rd place, bronze medalist(s)	Jobst Hirscht, Karlheinz Klotz, Gerhard Wucherer, Klaus Ehl	West Germany	38.79	
4	Jaroslav Matoušek, Juraj Demeč, Jiří Kynos, Luděk Bohman	Czechoslovakia	38.82	
5	Manfred Kokot, Bernd Borth, Hans-Jürgen Bombach, Siegfried Schenke	East Germany	38.90	
6	Stanisław Wagner, Tadeusz Cuch, Jerzy Czerbniak, Zenon Nowosz	Poland	39.03	
7	Patrick Bourbeillon, Jean-Pierre Grès, Gérard Fenouil, Bruno Cherrier	France	39.14	
8	Vincenzo Guerini, Ennio Preatoni, Luigi Benedetti, Pietro Mennea	Italy	39.14	
