= Iván Mangual =

Puerto Rican sprinter

Personal information
- Full name: Félix Iván Mangual Guilbe
- Nationality: Puerto Rican
- Born: 22 July 1951 (age 74) Ponce, Puerto Rico
- Height: 1.77 m (5 ft 10 in)
- Weight: 66 kg (146 lb)

Sport
- Sport: Sprinting
- Events: 400 metres, 400 metres hurdles
Medal record
Representing Puerto Rico
Central American and Caribbean Games
Bronze medal – third place	1974 Santo Domingo	400m
Bronze medal – third place	1974 Santo Domingo	400m hurdles

Félix Iván "Palito" Mangual Guilbe (born July 22, 1951) is a Puerto Rican former track and field athlete who specialized in sprinting and hurdling events during the 1970s. He compete in 1974 Central American and Caribbean Games in Santo Domingo, where he csecured two bronze medals, finishing third in both the individual 400-meter dash and the 400-meter hurdles. Mangual went on to represent Puerto Rico making his Olympic debut at the 1976 Summer Olympics in Montreal, where he competed in the individual 400-meter sprint reaching the second round and ran as a member of the men's 4 × 400-meter relay squad alongside Pedro Ferrer, Julio Ferrer, and Jorge Ortiz.

== Early life and career ==
He was born on 22 July 1951 in Ponce, Puerto Rico.

He competed at the 1974 Central American and Caribbean Games, where he contested two events: the 400 m hurdles and the 400 m. He won a bronze medal in the 400m hurdles, finishing third in 46.42 seconds, behind Alberto Juantorena (42.52) and Seymour Newman (46.34). He also won a bronze medal in the 400 m sprint, losing to Fabio Juniga of Colombia (50.61) and Guillermo Núñez of Cuba (50.67). He also competes in 4 X 400 m with Jesus Rohena, Orquinio Santaella, and Juan Bonilla.

His Olympic debut was in the 400 m sprint, where he finished in position 7 in heat 2 at round 2 of four rounds and also in 4 × 400 m at the 1976 Summer Olympics, alongside Pedro Ferrer, Julio Ferrer, and Jorge Ortiz, where they finished 6th in Heat 1 of the quarterfinals.

In 1975 Pan American Games, he compete in 4 X 100 m relay and finished in 6th position at 40.52 seconds with Wilfredo Molina, Luis Alers and Jesus Cabrera.

== International competitions ==
Year	Competition	Venue	Position	Event	Notes
Representing Puerto Rico
1970	Central American and Caribbean Games	Panama City, Panama	8th (h)	400 m hurdles	53.9
1973	Universiade	Moscow, Soviet Union	14th (sf)	400 m	48.1
1974	Central American and Caribbean Games	Santo Domingo, Dominican Republic	3rd	400 m	46.42
1974	Central American and Caribbean Games	Santo Domingo, Dominican Republic	3rd	400 m hurdles	51.65
1974	Central American and Caribbean Games	Santo Domingo, Dominican Republic	–	4 × 100 m relay	DQ
1974	Central American and Caribbean Games	Santo Domingo, Dominican Republic	4th	4 × 400 m relay	3:10.60
1975	Central American and Caribbean Championships	Ponce, Puerto Rico	2nd	400 m	47.6
1975	Central American and Caribbean Championships	Ponce, Puerto Rico	1st	400 m hurdles	50.9
1975	Pan American Games	Mexico City, Mexico	4th	400 m hurdles	50.69
1975	Pan American Games	Mexico City, Mexico	8th	4 × 100 m relay	39.80
1975	Pan American Games	Mexico City, Mexico	5th	4 × 400 m relay	3:12.41
1976	Olympic Games	Montreal, Canada	11th (h)	4 × 400 m relay	3:06.08
1979	Central American and Caribbean Championships	Guadalajara, Mexico	3rd	4 × 100 m relay	40.72
1979	Pan American Games	San Juan, Puerto Rico	6th	4 × 100 m relay	40.28

== Personal bests ==
- 400 metres – 45.97 (1975)
