= Bazunu =

Bazunu is a surname. Notable people with the surname include:

- Gavin Bazunu (born 2002), Irish football goalkeeper
- Rex Bazunu (born 1953), Nigerian sprinter
