= Supanat Ariyamongkol =

Thai sprinter and coach (born 1946)

Personal information
- Nationality: Thai
- Born: Panus Ariyamongkol; 6 January 1946 (age 79)

Sport
- Sport: Sprinting
- Event: 4 × 100 metres relay

Police Major General Supanat Ariyamongkol (Thai: ศุภณัฐ อริยะมงคล), previously named Panus (พนัส, born 6 January 1946) is a Thai sprinter and coach. He competed in the men's 4 × 100 metres relay at the 1972 Summer Olympics, and is the head coach of the Thai national athletics team and Deputy Secretary-General of the Athletic Association of Thailand. He is the younger twin brother of Surapong Ariyamongkol.
