= Surapong Ariyamongkol =

Thai athlete (born 1946)

Personal information
- Nationality: Thai
- Born: 6 January 1946 (age 80)

Sport
- Sport: Sprinting
- Event: 4 × 100 metres relay

Police Major General Surapong Ariyamongkol (Thai: สุรพงษ์ อริยะมงคล, born 6 January 1946) is a Thai sprinter and coach. He competed in the men's 4 × 100 metres relay at the 1972 Summer Olympics, and is Secretary-General of the Athletic Association of Thailand and manager of the Thai national athletics team. He is the elder twin brother of Supanat Ariyamongkol.
