= Helmut Lang =

Helmut Lang may refer to:

- Helmut Lang (artist) (born 1956), Austrian-born fashion designer and artist
- Helmut Lang (athlete) (born 1940), Austrian Olympic sprinter
- Helmut Lang (fashion brand), brand created by Helmut Lang in 1986
