= Nick Kotys =

American football coach (1913–2005)

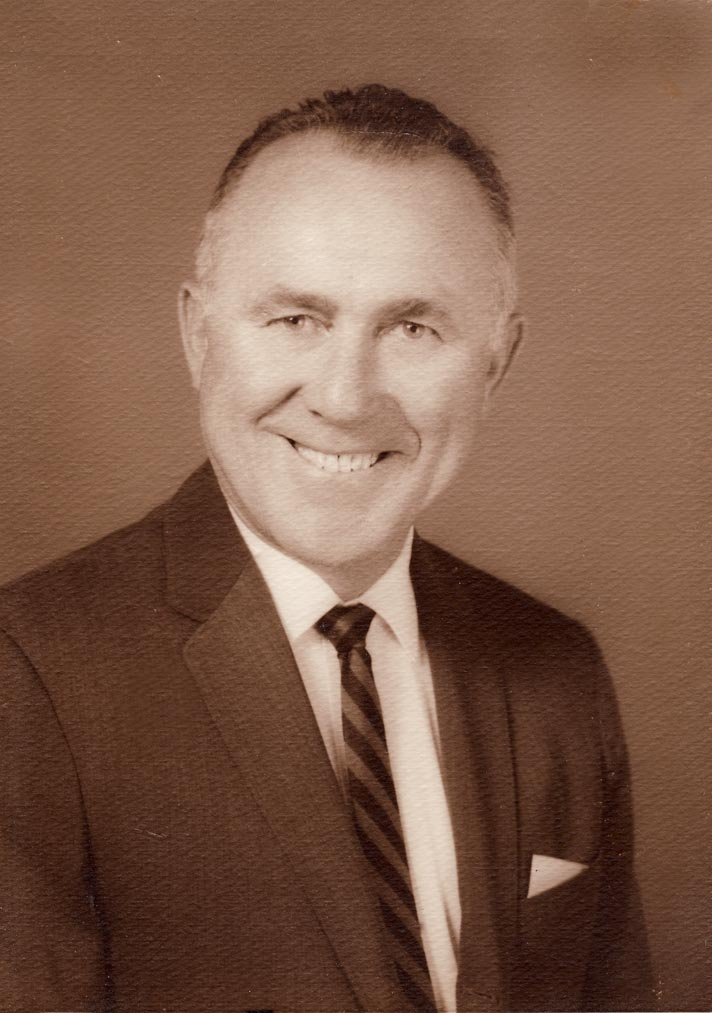

Biographical details
- Born: April 3, 1913; Monessen, Pennsylvania
- Died: July 28, 2005 (aged 92); Columbus, Ohio

Playing career
- 1938: Hazleton Redskins

Coaching career (HC unless noted)
- 1949–1951: Yale (backfield)
- 1952–1971: Coral Gables HS (FL)

Head coaching record
- Overall: 258–57–16

Nick Kotys (April 3, 1913 – July 28, 2005) was an American football coach. At Coral Gables Senior High School in Coral Gables, Florida, he built one of the most dominating high school football programs in Florida state history, winning state playoff championships in 1963, 1964, 1967 and 1968, and two unanimous mythical state newspaper poll championships in 1956 and 1958 before the playoff system started. His Coral Gables Cavaliers football teams also won five mythical national titles in 1956, 1964, 1967, 1968 and 1969.

In 1965, due to the federally mandated integration of public schools, black students attended Coral Gables for the first time. When the nearby black school, Carver was closed, some black students transferred to Coral Gables and joined the football team. One of these, Craig Curry, became known as "The Negro Quarterback". When the school was first integrated, blacks were denied entrance to school social events until Kotys and other coaches manned the doorways to make sure they were allowed to enter. Kotys received a great deal of criticism by those who opposed the idea of a black quarterback, but stuck with Curry because he deserved the position. Kotys and Curry led the 1967 team to an undefeated season in such a dominating fashion that the FHSAA recognized them as the "Team of the Century", and Kotys gave complete credit to Curry, saying "Craig does all the thinking. I only nod OK."

Kotys retired in 1971 after 20 seasons as head coach of the Cavaliers with a 160–33–9 record—his teams having won over eighty-one percent of their games played.

Kotys earned his B.S. in economics and education from Villanova University (1936), before starting his coaching career at Shickshinny, Bloomsburg, and Pottsville, Pennsylvania, where he compiled a 13-year record of 98–24–7. Kotys became the backfield coach under head coach Herman Hickman at Yale University in 1949. He left Yale to accept the head football coach and athletic director positions at Coral Gables Senior High School in 1952.

Kotys was inducted into the Florida Sports Hall of Fame in 1984. Thirty-six years after he retired from coaching, the Florida High School Athletic Association (FHSAA) named him to its All-Century Team in 2007.
