= Jonathan Vilma =

American football player & analyst (born 1982)

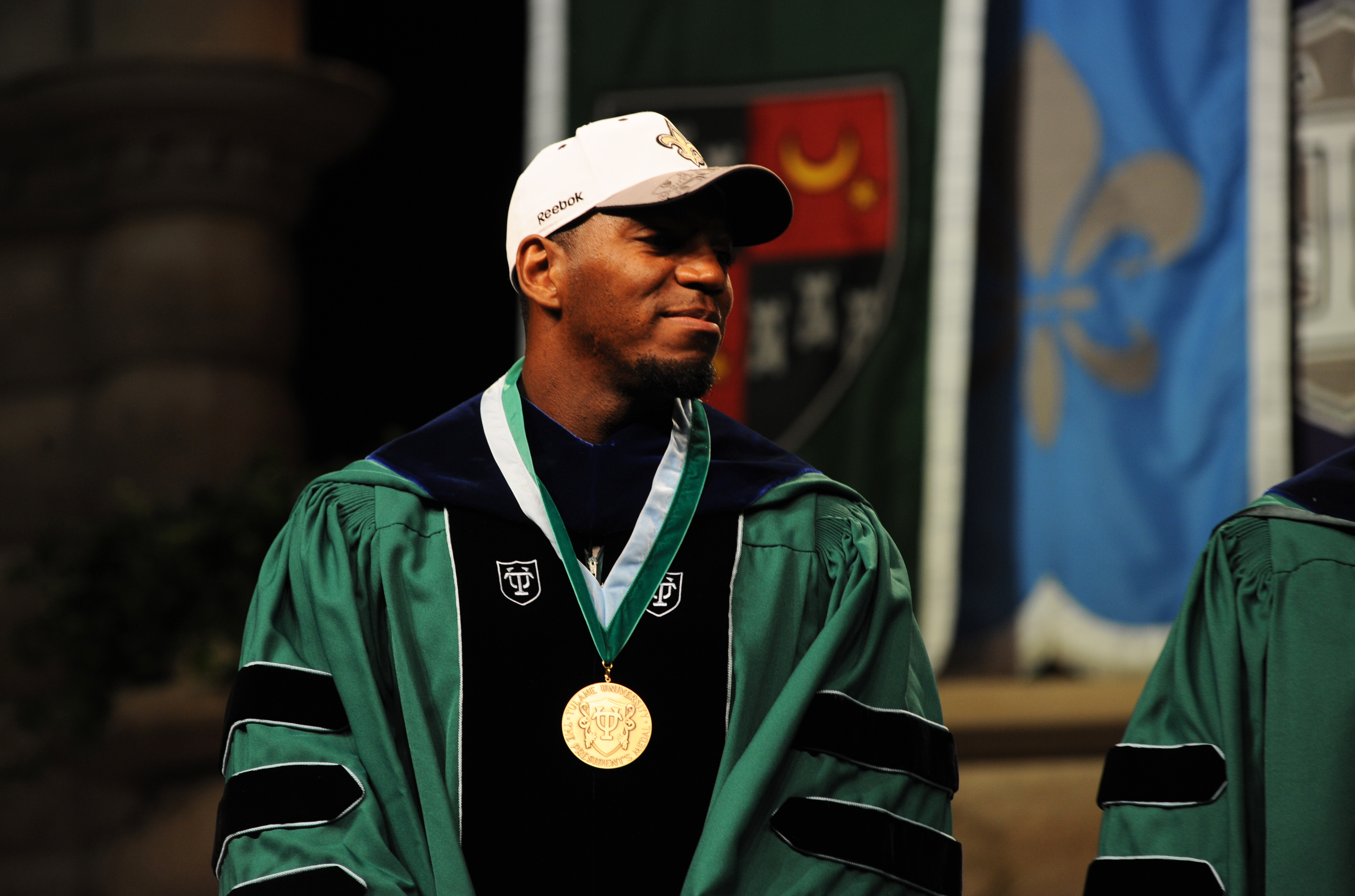
- Vilma with the New Orleans Saints in 2010

No. 51
- Position: Linebacker

Personal information
- Born: April 16, 1982 (age 44); New York City, U.S.
- Listed height: 6 ft 1 in (1.85 m)
- Listed weight: 230 lb (104 kg)

Career information
- High school: Coral Gables Senior (Coral Gables, Florida)
- College: Miami (FL) (2000–2003)
- NFL draft: 2004: 1st round, 12th overall pick

Career history
- New York Jets (2004–2007); New Orleans Saints (2008–2013)

Awards and highlights
- Super Bowl champion (XLIV); NFL Defensive Rookie of the Year (2004); 3× Pro Bowl (2005, 2009, 2010); NFL solo tackles leader (2005); NFL combined tackles leader (2005); PFWA All-Rookie Team (2004); New Orleans Saints Hall of Fame; BCS national champion (2001); Jack Lambert Trophy (2003); First-team All-American (2003); First-team All-Big East (2001, 2002, 2003)

Career NFL statistics
- Total tackles: 879
- Sacks: 10.5
- Forced fumbles: 11
- Fumble recoveries: 10
- Interceptions: 12
- Defensive touchdowns: 3
- Stats at Pro Football Reference

Jonathan Polynice Vilma (born April 16, 1982) is an American color analyst and former professional football player in the National Football League (NFL). He played as a linebacker and was a three-time Pro Bowl selection.

Vilma played college football for the Miami Hurricanes, winning a national championship in 2001. He was selected by the New York Jets in the first round of the 2004 NFL draft. Vilma won a Super Bowl championship with the New Orleans Saints. He serves as a color analyst for the NFL on Fox. He previously worked at ESPN as a college football commentator and studio analyst. Vilma was elected as a member of the Orange Bowl Committee in 2018.

== Early life ==
Vilma was born in the East Harlem neighborhood of New York City to Haitian immigrant parents. His family moved to Coral Gables, Florida, when Vilma was 6 years old, where he attended G. W. Carver Middle School and later Coral Gables Senior High School, where he was a teammate of Pro Bowl running back Frank Gore.

== College career ==
Vilma received an athletic scholarship to attend the University of Miami, and played for coach Butch Davis and coach Larry Coker's Miami Hurricanes football teams from 2000 to 2003.

=== 2000 season ===
In 2000, Vilma played in all 11 games as a reserve middle linebacker and compiled 38 tackles (29 solo) and a pass deflection.

=== 2001 season ===
After the graduation of Dan Morgan, Vilma stepped into the starting middle linebacker role and played an integral role on the Hurricanes' National Championship team. He led the team in tackles with 79 (54 solo) and compiled two forced fumbles, one fumble recovery for a 36-yard touchdown, three pass deflections and an interception. He started 11 of 12 games during the regular season and was selected on the First-team All-Big East team.

=== 2002 season ===
Vilma led Miami in tackles with 133 (75 solo), and had two quarterback sacks, a forced fumble, two recovered fumbles, (returning one for a touchdown) and broke up five passes. He earned unanimous first-team All-Big East selection for the second time in his career and was a semi-finalist for the Dick Butkus Award, along with teammate D. J. Williams.

=== 2003 season ===
In his final year, Vilma led the team in tackles for a third time with 127 (81 solo), with one sack, forced one fumble, and recovered three fumbles. Vilma ended the year as a finalist for the Butkus Award.

Along with his success on the field, Vilma was a three-time Academic All-Big East Conference. He received a bachelor's degree in finance from the University of Miami's School of Business Administration.

Vilma was interviewed about his time at the University of Miami for the documentary The U, which premiered December 12, 2009, on ESPN.

== Professional career ==
Pre-draft measurables
Height	Weight	Arm length	Hand span	40-yard dash	20-yard shuttle	Three-cone drill	Vertical jump	Broad jump	Bench press
6 ft 0 1/2 in (1.84 m)	233 lb (106 kg)	31 1/2 in (0.80 m)	9 3/8 in (0.24 m)	4.60 s	4.20 s	6.67 s	37 in (0.94 m)	10 ft 1 in (3.07 m)	23 reps
All values from NFL Combine/Pro Day

=== New York Jets ===
Vilma was drafted by the Jets in the first round with the 12th selection in the 2004 NFL draft.

==== 2004 ====
In 2004, Vilma was named as the NFL Defensive Rookie of the Year by the Associated Press. During his rookie campaign, he recorded 107 tackles, two sacks, and three interceptions, one of which was returned for his first NFL touchdown.

==== 2005 ====
In 2005, Vilma led the NFL in tackles with 169, forced four fumbles, notched one fumble recovery, half a sack, and one interception. Vilma also replaced Zach Thomas at the 2006 Pro Bowl.

==== 2006 ====
In 2006, Vilma put together another solid season. He compiled 114 tackles, one forced fumble, one fumble recovery, and one interception.

==== 2007 ====
On October 27, 2007, Vilma was placed on injured reserve. He suffered a season ending knee injury during the New York Jets week 7 game against the Cincinnati Bengals.

=== New Orleans Saints ===
==== 2008 ====
On February 29, 2008, the Jets traded Vilma to the New Orleans Saints for a fourth-round draft pick in the 2008 NFL draft and a conditional pick in the 2009 NFL draft (ultimately a third-round pick). Jets then-head coach Eric Mangini elected to start linebackers Eric Barton and David Harris in his place.

In his first season with the Saints, Vilma was a bright spot on a weak defensive unit. Vilma played in all 16 games, and recorded 132 tackles with one sack.

==== 2009: Super Bowl year ====
On February 27, 2009, Vilma signed a five-year, $34 million contract with the Saints. Vilma was elected one of the defensive captains, led the team in tackles, had three interceptions, and was chosen for his second Pro Bowl. In Super Bowl XLIV on February 7, 2010, Vilma made several important plays, including making a key defensive audible and deflecting a pass on 3rd and 11 in the fourth quarter. The Saints beat the Indianapolis Colts 31–17.

==== 2010–2011 ====
Vilma again led the team in tackles in 2010, started every game, and was selected to the Pro Bowl. He was ranked 37th by his fellow players on the NFL Top 100 Players of 2011. In 2011, he started and played in 11 games but was inactive for five others with a knee injury. He was ranked 58th by his fellow players on the NFL Top 100 Players of 2012.

==== 2012: Bounty scandal ====
Vilma was a central figure in the New Orleans Saints bounty scandal. The NFL alleged that defensive coordinator Gregg Williams operated an incentive program, which paid out "bounties" for deliberately putting opposing players out of games. The league alleged that Vilma offered $10,000 cash to anyone who knocked Brett Favre out of the 2009 NFC Championship Game. Most notably, Favre was forced out of the game for one play with an ankle injury. Although up to 27 players were accused of involvement, Vilma was the only player initially singled out by the league for his role. The NFL suspended Vilma for the entire 2012 season on May 2, 2012. The suspension was reported to be the longest suspension related to in-game misconduct in modern NFL history, dwarfing the previous record of five games handed to Albert Haynesworth for stomping on Andre Gurode's head in 2006. The league contended that Vilma and defensive end Will Smith aided Williams in starting the alleged program in 2009. Vilma found out about the suspension when it was announced on SportsCenter, immediately announced his intent to appeal and adamantly denied that he was involved in any sort of bounty scheme. Vilma filed a personal slander suit against Roger Goodell.

Opinions about the suspensions were divided, as alleged targets like Favre and Kurt Warner claimed that incentive programs were part of the game, which was corroborated by former players interviewed by Sports Illustrated. On July 26, Vilma and seven witnesses from the Saints (along with a sworn affidavit from Drew Brees) testified to a federal judge in New Orleans that NFL commissioner Roger Goodell misrepresented the facts in the league's investigation. Vilma's suspension was overturned on September 7, and he was reinstated for the 2012 season. The Associated Press reported Goodell's disappointment in the determination of the arbitration board's ruling.

On October 9, 2012, the league again suspended Vilma, Browns linebacker Scott Fujita, Saints defensive end Will Smith and free-agent defensive end Anthony Hargrove. Vilma's suspension lasted throughout the entire 2012 season, but he was allowed to retain his paychecks (when he was on the Physically Unable to Perform list) for the first six weeks of the season. The suspensions were then reviewed by former NFL Commissioner Paul Tagliabue, who overruled Roger Goodell and vacated the suspensions on December 11, 2012. Vilma continued his defamation lawsuit against commissioner Goodell, but it was ultimately dismissed in January 2013.

In total, Vilma played in 11 games during the 2012 season.

==== 2013 ====
Vilma underwent knee surgery during the preseason and was placed on the Reserve/Injured Designated for Return list, with the hope that he would recover in time to play during the season. He was reactivated for the Saints' eighth game, a 26–20 loss to his former team, the New York Jets, and was in the game for only 12 defensive snaps. The following week, he was again placed on injured reserve, ending his 2013 season.

==== 2014 ====
On February 12, 2014, Vilma's contract was not renewed with the New Orleans Saints. He became a guest analyst on Bleacher Report.

Vilma officially retired from football, and was honored by the Saints before their home game on December 6, 2015. Vilma was inducted into the New Orleans Saints Hall of Fame on October 29, 2017.

== NFL career statistics ==
Legend
	Led the league
**Bold**	Career best

Year	Team	GP	Tackles				Interceptions				Fumbles	
Year	Team	GP	Cmb	Solo	Ast	Sck	Int	Yds	PD	TD	FF	FR
2004	NYJ	16	108	77	31	2.0	**3**	**58**	5	**1**	0	1
2005	NYJ	16	**173**	**128**	45	0.5	1	1	6	0	**4**	1
2006	NYJ	16	117	69	**48**	0.0	1	0	4	0	0	1
2007	NYJ	7	41	31	11	0.0	1	1	4	0	1	0
2008	NO	16	132	98	34	1.0	1	8	6	0	2	**3**
2009	NO	15	110	87	23	2.0	**3**	25	**8**	0	0	0
2010	NO	16	105	70	35	**4.0**	1	5	3	0	3	1
2011	NO	11	54	36	18	0.0	0	0	2	**1**	1	3
2012	NO	11	37	20	17	1.0	1	18	2	**1**	0	0
2013	NO	1	1	1	0	0.0	0	0	0	0	0	0
Totals		125	879	617	262	10.5	12	116	40	3	11	10

== Personal life ==
Vilma's parents, Fritz Vilma and Nelly Banatte, migrated to the United States from Haiti in the 1970s. After the 2010 earthquake, he was active in relief efforts. He started the Jonathan Vilma Foundation after the 2010 Haiti earthquake to help with the rebuilding efforts in Haiti, in particular a charter school to educate students from elementary school to high school.

Vilma is a spokesman for Under Armour and WaterBank of America USA Inc.
