= Jerzy Czerbniak =

Polish sprinter

Personal information
- Nationality: Polish
- Born: 29 September 1947 (age 78) Kutno, Poland
- Height: 1.78 m (5 ft 10 in)
- Weight: 72 kg (159 lb)

Sport
- Sport: Sprinting
- Event: 4 × 100 metres relay
- Club: AZS Łódź

Jerzy Czerbniak (born 29 September 1947) is a Polish sprinter. He competed in the men's 4 × 100 metres relay at the 1972 Summer Olympics.

== International competitions ==
| Year | Competition | Venue | Position | Event | Notes |
Representing Poland
| 1972 | Olympic Games | Munich, West Germany | 6th | 4 × 100 m relay | 39.03 |

== Personal bests ==
Outdoor

- 100 metres – 10.53 (Warsaw 1972)
- 200 metres – 21.21 (Warsaw 1972)

Indoor

- 60 metres – 6.73 (Zabrze 1973)
