= Gerald Tinker =

American football player and track athlete (born 1951)

Medal record

Men's athletics

Representing United States

Olympic Games
Gold medal – first place	1972 Munich	4 × 100 m relay

Gerald Alexander Tinker (born January 19, 1951) is an American former track athlete and football player. He won a gold medal in the 4 × 100 metres relay at the 1972 Summer Olympics.

== Early life ==
Gerald Tinker attended Coral Gables Senior High School in Coral Gables, Florida, where he excelled as a football and track athlete. In 1967, Tinker, along with quarterback Craig Curry and Bertram Taylor, was part of an all-black backfield at the previously all-white school. The team was rated the team of the century by the FHSAA.

== Sprinting career ==
Running for the Kent State Golden Flashes track and field team, Tinker won the 1973 60 yards at the NCAA Division I Indoor Track and Field Championships.

At the 1972 Summer Olympics, Gerald Tinker ran the third leg in the American 4 × 100 metres relay team, which won a gold medal and equalled the United States' own world record of 38.19. His cousin, Larry Black, also ran a leg in that same relay. Larry Black attended Miami Killian High School where he also was a track star. His school was a football rival of Coral Gables Senior High School that Gerald attended. Despite that, both teamed up to help win Olympic Gold.

== NFL career ==
Gerald Tinker
No. 81, 82
- Position: Wide receiver

Personal information
- Born: January 19, 1951 (age 75); Miami, Florida, U.S.
- Listed height: 5 ft 9 in (1.75 m)
- Listed weight: 173 lb (78 kg)

Career information
- High school: Coral Gables Senior (Coral Gables, Florida)
- College: Kent State/Memphis
- NFL draft: 1974: 2nd round, 44th overall pick

Career history
- Atlanta Falcons (1974–1975); Green Bay Packers (1975)

Career NFL statistics
- Receptions: 8
- Receiving yards: 133
- Total TDs: 3
- Stats at Pro Football Reference

After the Olympics, Tinker was selected by the Atlanta Falcons in the 2nd round (44th overall) of the 1974 NFL draft as wide receiver. He played for the Falcons (1974–1975) and the Green Bay Packers (1975).
