= Coral Gables Senior High School =

Public secondary school in United States

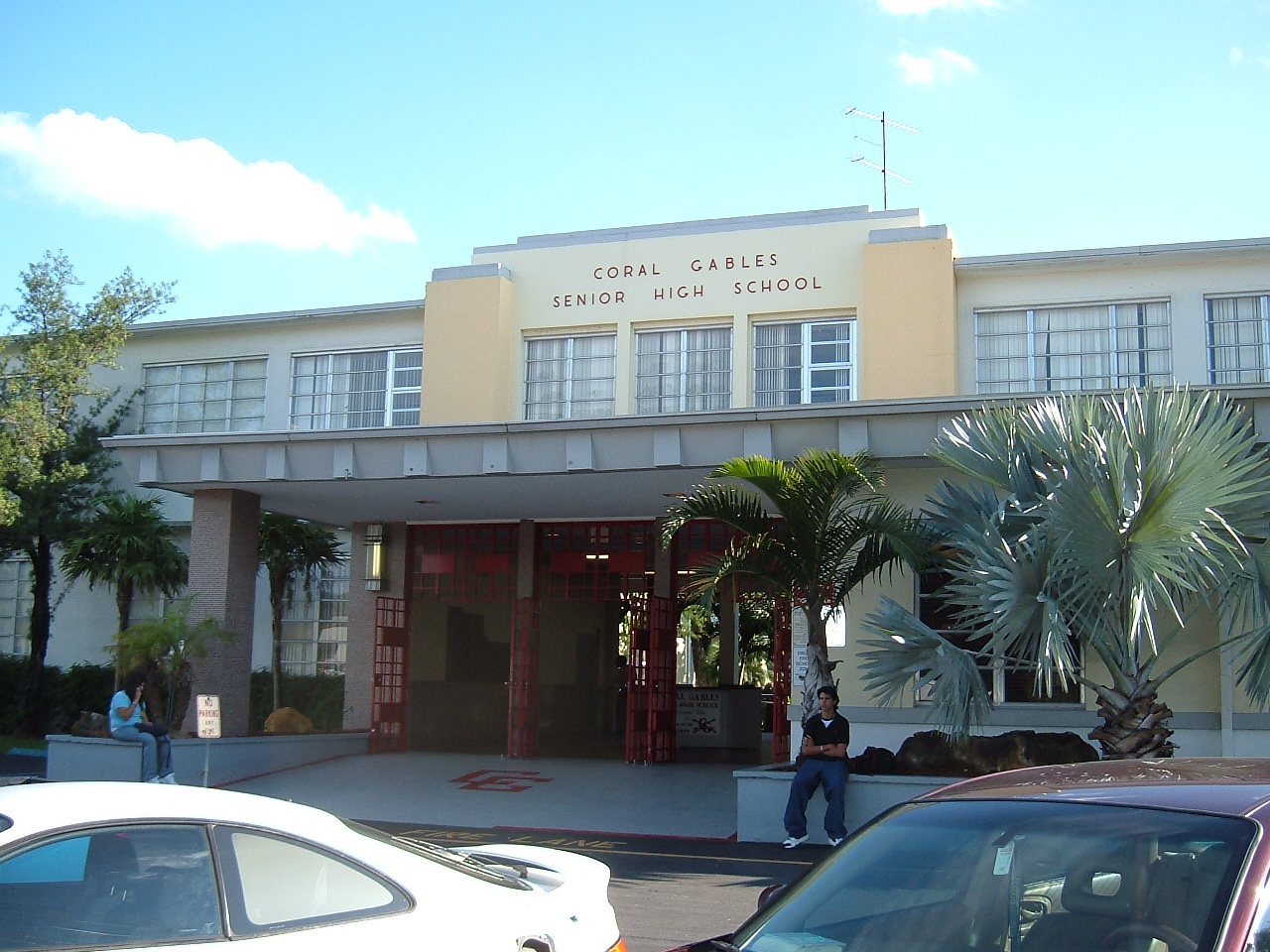
- Coral Gables Senior High School in October 2006

Location
- 450 Bird Road; Coral Gables, Florida 33146; United States
- Coordinates: 25°44′3.22″N 80°15′45.88″W

Information
- Type: Public secondary
- Established: September 1950; 75 years ago
- School district: Miami-Dade County Public Schools
- Principal: Anthony Balboa
- Teaching staff: 120.00 (FTE)
- Grades: 9–12
- Enrollment: 2,884 (2023–2024)
- Student to teacher ratio: 24.03
- Campus: Suburban
- Colors: Crimson and gray
- Mascot: Cavalier
- School hours: 7:15 AM to 2:20 PM
- Average class size: 38
- School motto: Dirigo (Latin for "I lead")
- Website: https://coralgablescavaliers.org/

Coral Gables Senior High School is a secondary school located at 450 Bird Road in Coral Gables, Florida, United States. The school opened in 1950. Its architectural design reflects a Spanish influence. Open courtyards adorned with water fountains. New buildings, including a three-story building, have since been added to its 26-acre (110,000 m^{2}) campus.

Coral Gables SHS is accredited by the Southern Association of Colleges and Schools (SACS). The last review took place in the spring of 2006. The instructional faculty consists of 183 teachers. Eighty-two members of the faculty have a master's degree and six faculty members have earned a doctorate degree. Coral Gables High School was one of only twelve high schools in the nation to win the Siemens Foundation's Award for Advanced Placement. It ranks 221st in Newsweek's Top 1,000 U.S. Schools.

Coral Gables SHS is served by the Miami Metrorail at the Douglas Road Station.

== History ==
=== 20th century ===
The school opened in 1950 for the education of white students only. High school students had been moved from the previous campus, Ponce de Leon High School. Leland C. Shepard Jr. graduated from Ponce de Leon and the school was involved in the free speech case Gillman v. Holmes County School District. The new Coral Gables High retained the school yearbook name, Caveleon, and the school mascot, "Cavaliers". Ponce de Leon High School became Ponce de Leon Junior High School. The building had a cost of $1,500,000. It had 63 classrooms, a bright color scheme, a mixed cafeteria and auditorium or cafetorium, a laundry room, and a then-modern type of public address system.

In 1965, when integration of public schools was mandated by the federal courts, the nearby black school, Carver was closed, and many black students transferred to Coral Gables. Initially, black students were not allowed to attend school social events, but sports became a great unifier. Football coach Nick Kotys and others manned the doors to allow entrance to black students. One of the new students, Craig Curry, became known as "the Negro quarterback" and led the team to an undefeated season in which they dominated the mostly all-white competition, ultimately being named "The Team of The Century" by the FHSAA

=== 21st century ===
In September 2009, a 17-year-old student stabbed another 17-year-old student to death at the school. The perpetrator received a 40-year prison sentence. Francisco Alvarado of the Miami New Times said that the incident "spawned a lot of reactionary comments from Coral Gables High parents and former students, expressing shock that such a violent episode could take place at an otherwise well-behaved school in an affluent neighborhood".

== Demographics ==
Coral Gables SHS is 82% Hispanic (of any ethnicity), 6% Black, 10% White non-Hispanic and 2% Asian/other.

During the early 1950s some Jewish students were in the attendance zone for Coral Gables High but were instead sent to Miami High School; this was especially the case with girls, as many high-status girls' clubs at Coral Gables High did not admit Jews. By the mid 1950s, Jewish students were highly regarded and several Jewish Clubs started that did not include gentiles.

== News magazine ==
highlights is the Coral Gables SHS news magazine. It has been in circulation since 1948. The 2015–2016 school year was the first that highlights was published as a news magazine with six yearly issues instead of a newspaper format with seven to eight yearly issues. The change was made due to perceived shifts in the taste of the student body. Each issue of highlights has 32 pages and includes 6 sections: Features, News, Opinion, Sports, The Scene, and Insight sections.

highlights participates in the Florida Scholastic Press Association's (FSPA) district and statewide conventions, and has received the top 'All-Florida' award for several years. It received the highest rating in the state, the Sunshine Standout award twice from FSPA at the 2019 and 2021 state conventions. The staff's work has been nationally recognized by the Columbia Scholastic Press Association (CSPA) and the National Scholastic Press Association (NSPA). It has received Pacemaker status from NSPA recognizing over a decade of excellent scholastic achievement.

== Literary magazine ==
Catharsis is the literary magazine of Coral Gables SHS. It was previously called Encore. The 30-member staff produced its first magazine under the new name in 2010. It has been accepted to membership in the Florida Scholastic Press Association (FSPA) and the National Scholastic Press Association (NSPA).

== Model United Nations ==
Model United Nations, also known as Model UN, is an academic competition consisting of a political simulation of the United Nations and other deliberative bodies. Participating students represent a country, organization, or individual, and travel with teammates to conferences hosted by universities. Participants develop skills in public speaking, creative writing, negotiation, leadership, diplomacy, international policy, international relations, and the United Nations.

The Coral Gables Senior High School Model UN team attends four competitions annually: Miami-Dade College MUN; FIMUN, hosted by Florida International University; GatorMUN, hosted by the University of Florida; and MICSUN, hosted by the University of Miami. The organization hosts a yearly Model United Nations competition for middle schoolers called CavMUN.

== Gablettes ==
The Gablettes are the Coral Gables Senior High School Dance Team, originally founded in 1975.

== Band of Distinction and Color Guard ==
The Coral Gables Band of Distinction is a student group dedicated to music. The group contributes to the community by entertaining at pep-rallies, football games, and competitions. Band members participate in competitions such as the Florida Bandmasters Association's solo and ensemble competitions.

The Gables Guard is the color guard of Coral Gables SHS. During the fall, the band and color guard perform together at school football games and marching competitions. In winter, the color guard performs and competes in indoor competitions, such as SFWGA. The Coral Gables Guard is well known for their intricate, innovative routines. Each member competes in the Florida Bandmasters Association's solo and ensemble competitions.

== Notable alumni ==
=== Academia ===
- Robert H. Frank, professor of economics, Cornell University, business columnist for The New York Times

=== Artists ===
- Susan Hiller, conceptual artist

=== Astronauts ===
- William B. Lenoir, astronaut on Space Shuttle Columbia
- Winston E. Scott, former NASA astronaut and retired U.S. Navy Captain

=== Authors and writers ===
- Lillian Glass, author and media personality
- Katherine Kurtz, fantasy writer
- Donna Jo Napoli, children's author
- Karen Russell, author
- Roy Sekoff, founding editor, HuffPost

=== Business ===
- Maxine Clark, founder, Build-A-Bear Workshop

=== Criminals ===
- Paul Jennings Hill, first person executed for killing an abortion provider

=== Government and politics ===
- Steve Cohen, U.S. Congressman
- Keith Davids, former United States Navy Rear Admiral and White House Military Office director
- Janet Reno, former U.S. Attorney General

=== Film ===
- Alan Greenberg, film director
- Frank Zagarino, actor

=== Music ===
- Gil Green, music video director
- George Winston, jazz and new-age pianist

=== Science ===
- Paul Steinhardt, co-discover of icosahedrite, a naturally occurring icosahedral quasicrystal

=== Sports ===
==== Football ====
- Tom Bailey, former professional football player, Philadelphia Eagles
- Glenn Cameron, former professional football player, Cincinnati Bengals
- Neal Colzie, former professional football player, Miami Dolphins, Oakland Raiders, and Tampa Bay Buccaneers
- Craig Curry, "Negro Quarterback" of Gables first integrated team, which was named "Team of the Century" by the Florida High School Athletic Association
- Al Del Greco, former professional football player, Green Bay Packers, Houston Oilers, and Phoenix Cardinals
- Gary Dunn, former professional football player, Pittsburgh Steelers
- Frank Gore, former professional football player, Buffalo Bills, Indianapolis Colts, Miami Dolphins, New York Jets, and San Francisco 49ers
- Buddy Howell, former professional football player, Houston Texans and Los Angeles Rams
- Patrick McCain, former National Arena League professional football player
- Ralph Ortega, former professional football player, Atlanta Falcons and Miami Dolphins
- Denzel Perryman, professional football player, Los Angeles Chargers
- Larry Rentz, former professional football player, San Diego Chargers
- Pat Ruel, former collegiate and professional football coach
- Darryl Sharpton, former professional football player, Chicago Bears, Houston Texans, and Washington Redskins
- Gerald Tinker, former Olympic athlete and professional football player, Atlanta Falcons
- Jonathan Vilma, former professional football player, New York Jets and New Orleans Saints
- Van Waiters, former professional football player, Cleveland Browns and Minnesota Vikings
- Cary Williams, former professional football player, Baltimore Ravens, Philadelphia Eagles, Seattle Seahawks, Tennessee Titans, and Washington Redskins

==== Baseball ====
- Yonder Alonso, former professional baseball player, Cincinnati Reds, Oakland Athletics, San Diego Padres, and others
- Juan Alvarez, former professional baseball player, Anaheim Angels, Florida Marlins, and Texas Rangers
- Jonathan Diaz, former professional baseball player, Boston Red Sox and Toronto Blue Jays
- Mike Fuentes, former professional baseball player, Montreal Expos
- Rick Greene, former professional baseball player, Cincinnati Reds
- Mike Lowell, professional baseball player, Boston Red Sox, Florida Marlins, and New York Yankees
- Jim Maler, former professional baseball player, Seattle Mariners
- Eli Marrero, former professional baseball player, St. Louis Cardinals and others
- Eddy Rodríguez, former professional baseball player, San Diego Padres
- Woody Woodward, former professional baseball player, Atlanta Braves and Cincinnati Reds and manager of the Seattle Mariners

==== Basketball ====
- Al Cueto, for professional basketball player, American Basketball Association

==== Boxing ====
- Randy Clark, former professional boxer
- Glen Johnson, former professional boxer

==== Track and field ====
- John Pennel, first pole vaulter to clear 17 ft (5.2 m), 11 world record holder, and two-time Olympian

==== Other sports ====
- Zach Banks, racing driver

=== Television ===
- Gail Edwards, actress, It's a Living, Blossom, and Full House
- Lynda Goodfriend, actress, Happy Days
- Silvio Horta, producer, Ugly Betty and Jake 2.0
- David Norona, actor
- Hugh Wilson, director, writer, and creator of WKRP in Cincinnati, and Emmy Award winner

== See also ==
- Miami-Dade County Public Schools
- Education in the United States
