= Patrick McCain =

American football player (born 1992)

Profile
- Position: Quarterback

Personal information
- Born: March 21, 1992 (age 34); Coral Gables, Florida, U.S.
- Listed height: 6 ft 4 in (1.93 m)
- Listed weight: 235 lb (107 kg)

Career information
- High school: Coral Gables
- College: Jacksonville
- NFL draft: 2015: undrafted

Career history
- Tri-Cities Fever (2015); Nebraska Danger (2016–2017); Jacksonville Sharks (2018); Orlando Predators (2019)

Patrick McCain (born March 21, 1992) is an American former football quarterback. McCain previously played for the Nebraska Danger and Tri-Cities Fever of the Indoor Football League (IFL), and Orlando Predators of the National Arena League (NAL).

McCain played high school football at Coral Gables Senior High School, where he passed for 2,280 yards and 23 touchdowns with 348 rushing yards and 3 rushing touchdowns over the course of his junior and senior seasons. McCain originally committed to Lafayette; however, he transferred to Jacksonville after one season with the Leopards.

McCain went on to play for the Tri-Cities Fever of the Indoor Football League, where in 12 games he passed for 907 yards and 21 touchdowns. He then spent the 2016 and 2017 seasons with the Nebraska Danger. He signed with the Sharks on November 8, 2017 and as of 2018 is serving in a backup role to Adrian McPherson, though McCain had a few starts in 2018.
