= Harry Lockhart =

Bahamian sprinter

Personal information
- Nationality: Bahamian
- Born: 8 August 1952 (age 73)

Sport
- Sport: Sprinting
- Event: 4 × 100 metres relay

Harry Lockhart (born 8 August 1952) is a Bahamian sprinter. He competed in the men's 4 × 100 metres relay at the 1972 Summer Olympics.
