= Zach Banks-Calderín =

American racing driver

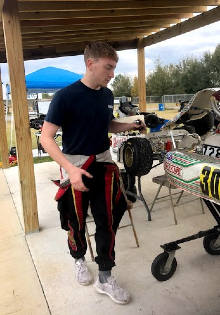
- Banks in 2019
- Born: Zachary Mitchell Banks; December 15, 1997 (age 28); Miami, Florida, U.S.
- Education: Florida State University, B.S. 2021
- Occupation: Racing driver
- Years active: 2012 - present
- Height: 5 ft 7 in (1.70 m)

Racing career
- Teams: Zach Banks-Calderín Racing
- Former teams: International Racing, Ocala Gran Prix

2021 Monticello Karting Championship career
- Car number: 28
- Engine: ROK Senior
- Starts: 10
- Wins: 10
- Poles: 5
- Fastest laps: 10

Previous series
- 2014-2017 2014-2017 2018-2020: Florida Winter Tour; U.S. ROK National Championship; Monticello Karting Championship

Championship titles
- 2019 - 2020: Monticello Rok Senior Champion

Awards
- 2015: Most Consecutive Wins (Homestead Karting)
- Statistics up to date as of April 17, 2021.
- Website: www.zachbankscalderin.com

Zachary Banks-Calderín (born December 15, 1997) is an American racing driver. Banks has recorded over 90 career race wins.

== Early life and education ==
Born to Cuban immigrant mother Jacqueline and Irish-American father Jason, Banks-Calderín grew up in Miami, Florida, where he attended George Washington Carver Middle School, and later Christopher Columbus High School, Immaculata-La Salle High School, and Coral Gables Senior High School, where he graduated. Banks-Calderín graduated with honors and served as president of his class during his junior year of high school. Banks-Calderín began attending Florida State University in 2016, pursuing a degree in management information systems.

== Racing career ==
=== 2012 - 2014 ===
Banks-Calderín competed in his first karting race in October 2012. He recorded his first win in October 2013 at Homestead-Miami Speedway in TAG Junior. His first championship came in early 2014 with International Racing, shortly after turning 16.

=== 2015 - present ===
Banks-Calderín's karting career progressed to the international stage with top-10 finishes in both the Cold Stone Florida Winter Tour and the United States ROK National Championship in 2015 and 2016. He won the 2016 Florida Karting Championship Series at Homestead-Miami Speedway in TAG Senior and the 2016 Florida State championship in ROK Senior. Banks-Calderín began testing Le Mans sports cars in 2017 at Homestead-Miami Speedway and Daytona International Speedway. In mid-2017, Banks-Calderín took a brief hiatus from racing to further his studies at Florida State.

Banks-Calderín resumed racing in September 2018, winning his first 8 races, consecutively. Banks-Calderín followed up his championships with another championship in the Monticello Racing Series in December 2019. Banks-Calderín won 17 races in 2019.

In August 2019, Banks-Calderín became an officially licensed Sports Car Club of America (SCCA) and International Motor Sports Association (IMSA) race car driver.

In December 2020, Banks-Calderín repeated as champion at Monticello in ROK Senior with a 15-win season, shortened by the Covid-19 Pandemic.

Banks-Calderín won his third consecutive championship at Monticello in 2021. Banks-Calderín graduated from Florida State University in 2021 with a degree in Management Information Systems, and stopped racing at Monticello.

After almost two years away from racing after college, Banks-Calderín moved to Charlotte, NC in May 2023 to resume his racing career - restarting his career under the name Zach Banks-Calderín, to honor his Cuban upbringing. Banks-Calderín worked at Rackley W.A.R. from May–July 2023, gaining experience before attempting to move up the ranks in oval racing.

Banks-Calderín has been featured as a guest on several podcasts and interviews since September 2018.

=== NASCAR Whelen Euro Series ===
Banks-Calderín was selected for the 2020 NASCAR Whelen Euro Series Driver Recruitment Program in Fontenay-le-Comte, France. Banks-Calderín signed a letter of intent to drive for Hendriks Motorsport for the 2020 season. However, due to the economic effects of the COVID-19 pandemic, the plans never materialized.

== Personal life ==
Banks-Calderín speaks Spanish, English, and Italian. Banks-Calderín has competed and placed on the podium of multiple ultramarathon races, including winning the 2020 Hellcat 50K in the male 20-24 category. Banks-Calderín has also competed in several triathlons, duathlons, and other endurance events.
