= Alfred Rabenja =

Malagasy sprinter

Personal information
- Nationality: Malagasy
- Born: 27 November 1944
- Died: March 2011

Sport
- Sport: Sprinting
- Event: 4 × 100 metres relay

Alfred Rabenja (27 November 1944 – March 2011) was a Malagasy sprinter. He competed in the men's 4 × 100 metres relay at the 1972 Summer Olympics.
