= Randy Clark (boxer) =

American boxer

Personal information
- Nationality: American
- Height: 6 ft 2 in / 188cm

Boxing career
- Stance: orthodox

Boxing record
- Total fights: 14
- Wins: 13
- Win by KO: 7
- Losses: 1

Randy Clark was a professional American Heavyweight boxer from Miami, Florida. Before turning to boxing, Clark was a high school football star at Coral Gables Senior High School in Coral Gables, Florida. Additionally, before beginning his boxing career Clark served four years with the United States Marine Corps.

== Career ==
Clark turned professional boxer without ever having an amateur fight. He turned professional on October 21, 1969, and scored a first round Knockout over Moses Green. Clark quickly became a fan favorite and gained a lot of support from blue collar workers in the South Florida area. Clark worked as a plasterer in the Miami area.

After compiling a record of eleven wins and no losses Clark appeared in his first main event. On June 20, 1972, Clark scored a ten-round decision over Fred Williams at the Miami Marine Stadium on Key Biscayne.

Clark was continuously plagued by injured hands throughout his career. Clark's unofficial professional record was thirteen wins and one loss.

He is the president of Olde World Walls & Ceilings, a traditional plastering company specializing in historical plaster restoration work.
