= Valentin Dmitriyenko =

Soviet hammer thrower

Personal information
- Born: 8 June 1951 (age 75) Novofedorivka, Soviet Union

Sport
- Sport: Track and field
Medal record
Representing Soviet Union
Summer Universiade
Gold medal – first place	1973 Moscow	Hammer throw

Valentin Dmitriyenko (born 8 June 1951) is a retired male hammer thrower, who competed for the Soviet Union during his career. He set his personal best (77.58 metres (254.5 ft)) on 26 August 1975 in Stuttgart.

== Achievements ==
Year	Competition	Venue	Position	Notes
Representing Soviet Union
1973	World Student Games	Moscow, Soviet Union	1st	
1974	European Championships	Rome, Italy	4th	71.18 m (233.5 ft)
