= Larry Black (sprinter) =

American sprinter (1951–2006)

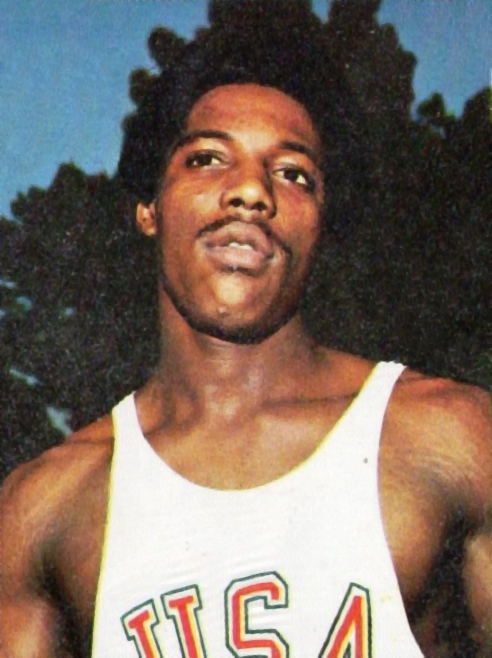
- Larry Black in 1972

Personal information
- Born: July 20, 1951 Miami, Florida, United States
- Died: February 8, 2006 (aged 54) Miami, Florida, United States
- Education: North Carolina Central University
- Height: 1.86 m (6 ft 1 in)
- Weight: 80 kg (176 lb)

Sport
- Sport: Athletics
- Event: 100–400 m
- Club: North Carolina Central University

Achievements and titles
- Personal bests: 100 yd – 9.3 (1974); 200 m – 20.19 (1972); 440 yd – 46.6 (1970)
Medal record
Representing the United States
Gold medal – first place	1972 Munich	4 × 100 m relay
Silver medal – second place	1972 Munich	200 m

Larry Jeffery "Mutt" Black (July 20, 1951 – February 8, 2006) was an American sprinter, winner of the gold medal in the 4 × 100 m relay and silver medal in the 200 m at the 1972 Summer Olympics in Munich.

Black was born in Miami, Florida, and graduated from Miami Killian Senior High with a scholarship to North Carolina Central University. Larry's coach at Miami Killian was Leroy Daniels. While studying there he won the NCAA 220 yd (200 m) championships in 1971. At the 1972 Olympics, Black ran the opening leg in the American 4 × 100 m relay team. The team won a gold medal and equaled the United States' own world record of 38.19 seconds. His cousin Gerald Tinker, also from the Miami area (rival Coral Gables High School), ran the third leg in that same gold medal winning race.

After retiring from sport Black returned to Miami and became director of its parks and recreation department. He died from an aneurysm in Miami on February 8, 2006, at the age of 54.
