= Mark Lutz (sprinter) =

American track and field athlete

Personal information
- Nationality: American
- Born: 23 December 1951 (age 74) Minneapolis, Minnesota, U.S.
- Height: 178 cm (5 ft 10 in)
- Weight: 68 kg (150 lb)

Sport
- Sport: Athletics
- Event: Sprints
- Club: Pacific Coast Club; Kansas Jayhawks
Medal record
Representing United States
Summer Universiade
Gold medal – first place	1973 Moscow	4x400m relay

Mark Edward Lutz (born December 23, 1951) is an American former sprinter. He ran for his home country in the 200 metres at the 1976 Summer Olympics, finishing 5th in his qualifying heat.

== Biography ==
Lutz studied at the University of Kansas where he was a key member of the Kansas Jayhawks track team between 1971 and 1974. During his time there he tried to qualify for 200 m event at the 1972 Munich Olympics but was eliminated in a qualifying heat at the United States Olympic Trials.

He was renowned at the time he was running for being one of the very few white sprinters at the elite level in the U.S. Lutz won a gold medal at the World University Games in 1973 as part of the 4 × 400 metres relay. That same year he was runner up at the USA Outdoor Track and Field Championships in the 200 metres.

Lutz the British AAA Championships title in the 200 metres event at the 1974 AAA Championships.

In 1976, and now attending Long Beach State University, Lutz qualified for the 200 m at the 1976 Montreal Olympics by finishing third at the trials. Lutz was a surprise qualifier. He was even last at the turn in the final, overtaking the more highly fancied Steve Riddick only in the closing stages. His American teammates Millard Hampton and Dwayne Evans went on to medal in the competition, finishing second and third respectively.

In 1976 he was married to distance star and both a Pacific Coast Club teammate and Long Beach State University classmate Francie Larrieu. She hyphenated her name during the period they were married. They divorced in 1978. He later married hurdler Patrice Donnelly, also a Montreal Olympian.
