= Gerhard Wucherer =

German sprinter

Personal information
- Born: 11 February 1948 (age 78)
Medal record
Men's Athletics
Representing West Germany
Olympic Games
Bronze medal – third place	1972 Munich	4 × 100 metres relay
European Championships
Silver medal – second place	1971 Helsinki	100 metres

Gerhard Wucherer (born 11 February 1948 in Kempten im Allgäu, Bavaria) is a German former athlete who competed mainly in the 100 metres.

He competed for West Germany in the 1972 Summer Olympics held in Munich, Germany in the 4 × 100 metre relay where he won the bronze medal with his teammates Jobst Hirscht, Karlheinz Klotz and Klaus Ehl.
