= Jerzy Homziuk =

Polish long jumper

Personal information
- Nationality: Polish
- Born: 8 March 1949 (age 77) Międzyrzec Podlaski, Poland

Sport
- Sport: Athletics
- Event: Long jump

Jerzy Piotr Homziuk (born 8 March 1949) is a Polish athlete. He competed in the men's long jump at the 1972 Summer Olympics.
