= Karlheinz Klotz =

West German athlete (born 1950)

Olympic medal record

Men's Athletics
Bronze medal – third place	1972 Munich	4 × 100 metre relay

Karlheinz Klotz (born 10 March 1950, in Karlsruhe) was a West German athlete who competed mainly in the 100 metres.

He competed for West Germany in the 1972 Summer Olympics held in Munich, Germany in the 4 × 100 metre relay where he won the bronze medal with his team mates Jobst Hirscht, Gerhard Wucherer and Klaus Ehl.
