= Rex Bazunu =

Nigerian sprinter

Personal information
- Nationality: Nigerian
- Born: 29 December 1953 (age 72)

Sport
- Sport: Sprinting
- Event: 4 × 100 metres relay

Rex Bazunu (born 29 December 1953) is a Nigerian sprinter. He competed in the men's 4 × 100 metres relay at the 1972 Summer Olympics.
