= Georg Regner =

Austrian sprinter

Personal information
- Nationality: Austrian
- Born: 6 June 1953 (age 73)

Sport
- Sport: Sprinting
- Event: 4 × 100 metres relay

Georg Regner (born 6 June 1953) is an Austrian sprinter. He competed in the men's 4 × 100 metres relay at the 1972 Summer Olympics.
