= Ron Jenkins (sprinter) =

American sprinter

Personal information
- Born: 1952 (age 73–74)

Sport
- Sport: Track and field
Medal record
Representing United States
Summer Universiade
| Gold medal – first place | 1973 Moscow | 4x400m relay |

Ron Jenkins (born 1952) is an American former sprinter.
