= Günther Würfel =

Austrian sprinter

Personal information
- Nationality: Austrian
- Born: 24 March 1948 (age 78)

Sport
- Sport: Sprinting
- Event: 4 × 100 metres relay

Günther Würfel (born 24 March 1948) is an Austrian sprinter. He competed in the men's 4 × 100 metres relay at the 1972 Summer Olympics.
