= Helmut Lang (athlete) =

Austrian sprinter

Personal information
- Nationality: Austrian
- Born: 14 August 1940 (age 85) Vienna, Germany

Sport
- Sport: Sprinting
- Event: 4 × 100 metres relay

Helmut Lang (born 14 August 1940) is an Austrian sprinter. He competed in the men's 4 × 100 metres relay at the 1972 Summer Olympics.
