= Jobst Hirscht =

German sprinter (born 1948)

Medal record

Men's athletics

Representing West Germany

Olympic Games
Bronze medal – third place	1972 Munich	4×100 m

European Indoor Championships
Silver medal – second place	1971 Sofia	60 m

Jobst Hirscht (born 19 July 1948) is a German former athlete who competed mainly in the 100 metres.

Born in Schleswig, he competed for West Germany in the 1972 Summer Olympics held in Munich, Germany in the 4 × 100 metre relay where he won the bronze medal with his teammates Karlheinz Klotz, Gerhard Wucherer and Klaus Ehl.
