= Craig Curry (quarterback) =

American football player (born 1950)

Profile
- Position: Quarterback

Personal information
- Born: August 5, 1950 (age 76)
- Listed height: 6 ft 2 in (1.88 m)
- Listed weight: 200 lb (91 kg)

Career information
- High school: Carver, Coral Gables (FL)
- College: Minnesota
- NFL draft: 1972: 8th round, 207th overall pick

Career history
- Miami Dolphins (1972)*
- * Offseason or practice squad member only

Awards and highlights
- Second-team All-Big Ten (1971)

Craig Curry (born August 5, 1950) is an American former college football player who was a quarterback for the Minnesota Golden Gophers from 1969 to 1971. He grew up in Coral Gables, Florida, and attended Coral Gables Senior High School. Curry was one of the most highly recruited high school quarterbacks in the country. With Minnesota, he led the Big Ten Conference in 1971 with 2,071 yards of total offense. He tried out with the Miami Dolphins of the National Football League (NFL) in 1972.

== Early life and education ==
Curry attended Carver High School until integration forced him to choose between all-black Mays High School or Coral Gables Senior High School. Curry chose to cross the color line and attend Gables, where he became known as "The Negro Quarterback". After going 7-3 in his junior year, as a senior Curry lead his team to a 13-0 record, winning Florida's large school state championship, and eventually being named "The Team of The Century" by the Florida High School Athletic Association.

Coach Nick Kotys endured much criticism for starting a black quarterback, as at the time they were not considered qualified for the position, but still started Curry for two years. After the team won the national championship in 1967, Kotys stated that "Craig does all the thinking. I only nod OK.".

A Coral Gables High School guidance counselor advised him to drop science classes, because of the weakness of his math from Carver. Curry then devoted himself to football at the expense of academics, a decision he regretted later in life. He wanted to attend the University of Miami, but because of death threats, chose to attend the University of Minnesota, where he earned a degree in psychology.

== Career ==
Curry was selected in the eighth round of the 1972 NFL draft by the Miami Dolphins. After being cut, he considered suicide. He then went to work for IBM for the next 16 years and then served as an academic advisor for athletes at the University of Michigan and director of the Center for the African-American Male at Albany State University. He later served as athletic director of the University of Arkansas-Pine Bluff.
