= Volodymyr Atamas =

Soviet sprinter

Personal information
- Nationality: Soviet
- Born: 15 July 1950 (age 75) Belgorod, Russian SSR, USSR

Sport
- Sport: Sprinting
- Event: 100 metres
Medal record
Representing Soviet Union
Summer Universiade
Silver medal – second place	1973 Moscow	4x100m relay

Volodymyr Atamas (born 15 July 1950) is a Soviet sprinter. He competed in the men's 100 metres at the 1972 Summer Olympics.
