= Thomas Whatley =

American sprinter

Personal information
- Born: March 23, 1953 (age 73) Montgomery, Alabama, United States

Sport
- Sport: Track and field
Medal record
Representing United States
Summer Universiade
Gold medal – first place	1973 Moscow	4x100m relay

Thomas Whatley (born March 23, 1953) is an American retired sprinter.

Whatley is from Montgomery, Alabama. He was an All-American sprinter for the Alabama Crimson Tide track and field team, placing 3rd in the 60 yards at the 1974 NCAA Indoor Track and Field Championships.
