= Vladimir Lovetskiy =

Soviet sprinter

Personal information
- Born: 26 October 1951 (age 74) Zhlobin, Belarusian SSR

Sport
- Sport: Track and field
Medal record
Representing Soviet Union
Olympic Games
Silver medal – second place	1972 Munich	4x100 metre relay
Summer Universiade
Silver medal – second place	1973 Moscow	4x100 metre relay

Vladimir Nikolayevich Lovetskiy (Belarusian: Уладзімір Мікалаевіч Лавецкі, Russian: Владимир Николаевич Ловецкий; born 26 October 1951) is a Soviet former athlete who competed mainly in the 100 metres. He trained in Minsk at Trudovye Rezervy.

He competed for the USSR in the 1972 Summer Olympics held in Munich, Germany in the 4 x 100 metre relay where he won the silver medal with his team mates Aleksandr Kornelyuk, Juris Silovs and Valeriy Borzov.
