= Dennis Schultz =

American sprinter

Personal information
- Born: February 19, 1951 (age 75) Manchester, Iowa, United States

Sport
- Sport: Track and field
Medal record
Representing United States
Summer Universiade
Gold medal – first place	1973 Moscow	4x400m relay

Dennis Schultz (born February 19, 1951) is an American former sprinter.

Schultz competed for the Oklahoma State Cowboys track and field team in the NCAA.
