= Athletics Association of Thailand =

Governing body of athletics in Thailand

- สมาคมกรีฑาแห่งประเทศไทย
- Sport: Athletics
- Jurisdiction: National
- Abbreviation: AAT
- Founded: 1948; 78 years ago
- Affiliation: IAAF
- Affiliation date: 1948
- Regional affiliation: AAA
- Headquarters: Khlong Luang, Pathum Thani
- President: Pol.Gen. Sant Sarutanond
- Secretary: Surapong Ariyamongkol

Official website
- www.aat.or.th
- (Thailand)

The Athletics Association of Thailand (AAT, Thai: สมาคมกรีฑาแห่งประเทศไทย), officially known as the Athletics Association of Thailand under the Royal Patronage of His Majesty the King Thai: สมาคมกรีฑาแห่งประเทศไทย ในพระบรมราชูปถัมภ์) is the national governing body for Sport of athletics. It is accredited by the International Association of Athletics Federations (IAAF) which is the governing body for the sport of Athletics in the world, and the National Olympic Committee of Thailand (NOCT). It founded in 1948.

The association is headquartered in Khlong Luang, Pathum Thani. The current head of the federation is Pol.Col. Sant Sarutanond.
