= Jean-Pierre Grès =

French sprinter

Personal information
- Nationality: French
- Born: 13 January 1949 (age 77) Signy-l'Abbaye, Ardennes, France

Sport
- Sport: Sprinting
- Event: 4 × 100 metres relay

Jean-Pierre Grès (born 13 January 1949) is a French sprinter. He competed in the men's 4 × 100 metres relay at the 1972 Summer Olympics.
