= Darwin Bond =

American sprinter

Personal information
- Born: August 17, 1951 (age 74) Kingsport, Tennessee, United States

Sport
- Sport: Track and field
Medal record
Representing United States
Summer Universiade
Gold medal – first place	1973 Moscow	4x400m relay

Darwin Bond (born August 17, 1951) is an American retired sprinter. He was an eight-time All-American at the University of Tennessee.
