= George Washington Carver School (Coral Gables, Florida) =

Location
- 4901 Lincoln Drive; Miami, Florida 33133; United States; 25°43′35.66″N 80°15′33.21″W

Information
- Type: Private to public
- Established: 1899-1966
- School district: Miami-Dade County Public Schools
- Grades: K - 12
- Hours in school day: 9:05 AM to 3:50 PM
- Campus size: 6 acres (2.4 ha)
- Campus type: Suburban
- Colors: Orange and Green
- Mascot: Hornet
- Website: gwcm.dadeschools.net

George Washington Carver School is a public school in Coral Gables, Florida. Now a middle school, it was once a K-12, segregated, black school. It is part of the Miami-Dade County Public Schools district.

== History ==
The school opened in 1899 as a black school, for black students residing in Dade County, although it traces its beginning to an earlier private school for black children, informally known as "The Little Schoolhouse," which opened in 1899 as the private Dade Training School. In 1943, when he died, the school was renamed after George Washington Carver. Carver was desegregated by a court order in 1966-1967. For athletics, the school participated in the Florida Interscholastic Athletic Association.

After integration, the school became a junior high school, and later a middle school.

== Notable alumni ==
- Zach Banks - racing driver
- Craig Curry - football player, businessman attended Carver until it was closed for integration
- Edwin T. Pratt, civil rights activist
- Winston E. Scott - astronaut

== Notable faculty ==
- Bertha Vazquez - science teacher and director of the Teacher Institute for Evolutionary Science

== See also ==
- Miami-Dade County Public Schools
