= Juris Silovs (athlete) =

Latvian athletics competitor

Personal information
- Born: 30 August 1950 Krāslava, Latvian SSR, Soviet Union (now Latvia)
- Died: 28 September 2018 (aged 68)

Sport
- Sport: Athletics
- Event: 4 × 100 metres relay
Medal record
Men's Athletics
Representing the Soviet Union
Olympic Games
| Silver medal – second place | 1972 Munich | 4 × 100 m relay |
| Bronze medal – third place | 1976 Montreal | 4 × 100 m relay |
Summer Universiade
| Gold medal – first place | 1973 Moscow | 100 m |
| Gold medal – first place | 1975 Rome | 4 × 100 m relay |
| Gold medal – first place | 1977 Sofia | 4 × 100 m relay |
| Silver medal – second place | 1973 Moscow | 4 × 100 m relay |

Juris Silovs (Russian: Силов, Юрий Викентьевич; 30 August 1950 – 28 September 2018) was a Latvian athlete from Krāslava who competed for the Soviet Union from 1970 till 1978, mainly in the 100 metres. He trained at the VSS Vārpa in Riga.

== Sports career ==
Silovs competed for the USSR in the 1972 Summer Olympics held in Munich in the 4 × 100 metre relay, where he won the silver medal with his teammates Aleksandr Kornelyuk, Vladimir Lovetskiy and Valeriy Borzov. He returned for the 1976 Summer Olympics held in Montreal in the 4 × 100 metre relay, where the team won the bronze medal with Aleksandr Aksinin, Nikolay Kolesnikov and Valeriy Borzov.

Silovs also competed in the 1973 Universiade in Moscow, winning gold in the 100 m event, as well as silver in the 4 × 100 m relay team event. He also won gold in 1975 and 1977 in the 4 × 100 m relay event.

He retired due to trauma in 1978, later becoming a catering entrepreneur.

== Personal bests ==
| Event | Time | Date | Location | Notes |
|---|---|---|---|---|
| 60 m (indoor) | 6.65 s | 9 March 1974 | Gothenburg, Sweden | Latvian record |
| 60 m (hand stopwatch; indoor) | 6.4 s | 4 February 1971 | Moscow, USSR | Latvian record |
| 100 m | 10.33 s | 17 August 1973 | | |
| 100 m (hand stopwatch) | 10.1 s | 1974 | | |
| 100 m (indoor) | 10.66 s | 1 March 1978 | Moscow, USSR | Latvian record |
| 200 m | 21.3 s | 1973 | | |
