= Pedro Ferrer (athlete) =

Puerto Rican sprinter

Personal information
- Nationality: Puerto Rican
- Born: 21 April 1952 (age 74) Carolina, Puerto Rico
- Height: 1.68 m (5 ft 6 in)
- Weight: 61 kg (134 lb)

Sport
- Sport: Track and Field
- Event: 100 metres
- College team: Los Gallitos (UPR Rio Piedras)

Pedro Ferrer Andino (born 21 April 1952) is a Puerto Rican sprinter. He competed in the men's 100 metres in the Munich, Germany Olympics of 1972 and at the 1976 Summer Olympics in Montreal, Canada.

Hi was the older brother of hurdler Julio Ferrer.
