= Klaus Ehl =

German sprinter

Personal information
- Born: 16 August 1949 (age 76) Paderborn, West Germany

Sport
- Sport: Track and field
Medal record
Representing West Germany
Olympic Games
Bronze medal – third place	1972 Munich	4×100 m relay
European Indoor Championships
Gold medal – first place	1975 Katowice	4×320 m relay
Summer Universiade
Bronze medal – third place	1975 Rome	4x100 m relay

Klaus Johannes Ehl (born 16 August 1949) is a German former athlete who competed mainly in the 100 metres.

== Biography ==
Born in Paderborn, he competed for West Germany in the 1972 Summer Olympics held in Munich, Germany in the 4 × 100 metre relay where he won the bronze medal with his team mates Jobst Hirscht, Karlheinz Klotz and Gerhard Wucherer.
