= Bernd Borth =

German sprinter

Personal information
- Nationality: German
- Born: 25 July 1948 (age 77) Freyburg, Germany

Sport
- Sport: Sprinting
- Event: 100 metres

Bernd Borth (born 25 July 1948) is a German sprinter. He competed in the men's 100 metres at the 1972 Summer Olympics representing East Germany.
