= Athletics at the 1973 Summer Universiade =

Athletics at the VII Summer Universiade
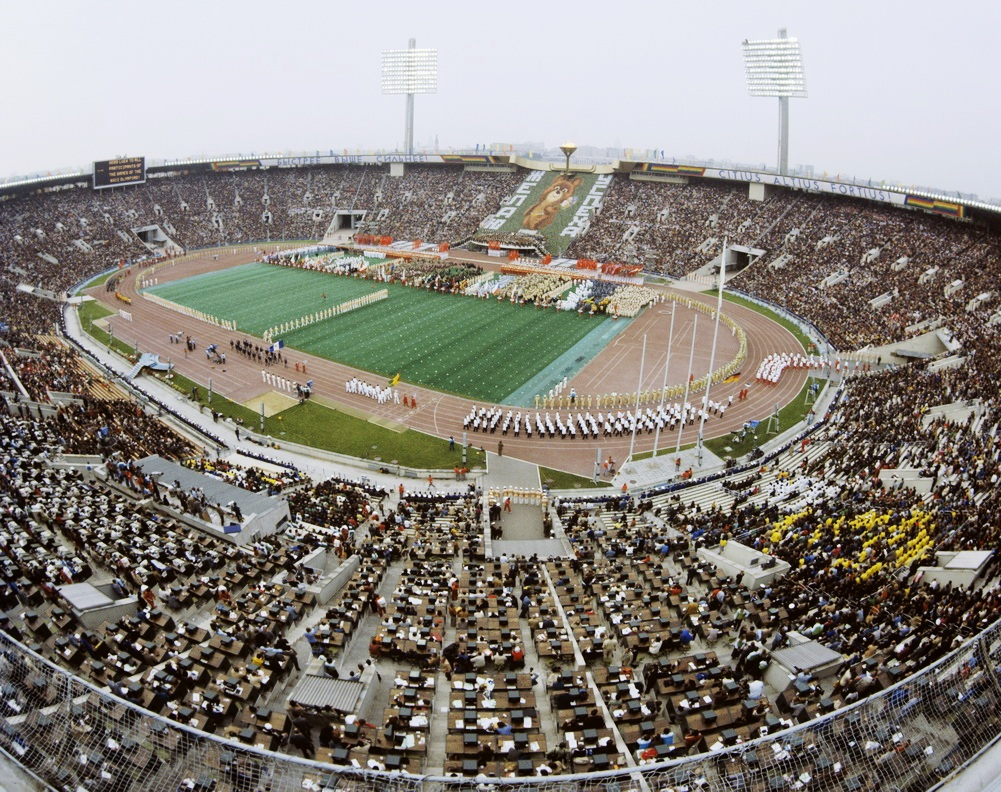
- The host stadium for the events (shown in 1980)
- Dates: 16–20 August 1973
- Host city: Moscow, Soviet Union
- Venue: Central Lenin Stadium
- Level: University
- Events: 34

Athletics events were contested at the 1973 Summer Universiade in Moscow, Soviet Union, between 16 and 20 August.

== Medal summary ==
=== Men's events ===
Event	Gold		Silver		Bronze	
100 metres (wind: 0.0 m/s)	Juris Silovs (URS)	10.37	Silvio Leonard (CUB)	10.43	Pietro Mennea (ITA)	10.48
200 metres (wind: +0.1 m/s)	Pietro Mennea (ITA)	20.56	Chris Monk (GBR)	20.70	Wardell Gilbreath (USA)	20.80
400 metres	Alberto Juantorena (CUB)	45.36	Semyon Kocher (URS)	46.32	David Jenkins (GBR)	46.39
800 metres	Yevgeniy Arzhanov (URS)	1:46.88	Marcel Philippe (FRA)	1:47.29	Hans-Henning Ohlert (GDR)	1:47.51
1500 metres	Frank Clement (GBR)	3:42.32 UR	Tony Waldrop (USA)	3:42.70	Reggie McAfee (USA)	3:43.20
5000 metres	Mikhail Zhelobovskiy (URS)	13:41.25	Glenn Herold (USA)	13:41.87	Valentin Zotov (URS)	13:43.60
10,000 metres	Dane Korica (YUG)	28:48.90	Norman Morrison (GBR)	28:48.99	Patrick Kiingi (KEN)	28:50.80
110 metres hurdles (wind: 0.0 m/s)	Berwyn Price (GBR)	13.69	Anatoliy Moshiashvili (URS)	13.73	Thomas Munkelt (GDR)	13.80
400 metres hurdles	Dmitriy Stukalov (URS)	49.62	Miroslav Kodejš (TCH)	49.94	Tadeusz Kulczycki (POL)	50.54
3000 metres steeplechase	Leonid Savelyev (URS)	8:26.49	Michael Karst (FRG)	8:28.32	Jan Kondzior (POL)	8:28.66
4 × 100 metres relay	United States (USA); Thomas Whatley; Wardell Gilbreath; Larry Brown; Steve Riddick	39.10 UR	Soviet Union (URS); Aleksandr Zhidkikh; Vladimir Lovetskiy; Juris Silovs; Vladimir Atamas	39.46	Italy (ITA); Vincenzo Guerini; Luigi Benedetti; Sergio Morselli; Pietro Mennea	39.55
4 × 400 metres relay	United States (USA); Mark Lutz; Darwin Bond; Ron Jenkins; Dennis Schultz	3:04.40	Great Britain (GBR); David Jenkins; Joe Chivers; Stephen Black; Stewart McCallum	3:05.38	West Germany (FRG); Franz-Josef Gleen; Siegfried Götz; Wolfgang Druschky; Bernd Herrmann	3:06.11
High jump	Vladimír Malý (TCH)	2.18	István Major (HUN)	2.18	Vladimir Abramov (URS); Enzo Del Forno (ITA); Csaba Dosa (ROM); Valentin Gavrilov (URS); John Hawkins (CAN); Robert Joseph (USA); Roman Moravec (TCH)	2.15
Pole vault	François Tracanelli (FRA)	5.42	Yuriy Isakov (URS); Terry Porter (USA)	5.30		
Long jump	Valeriy Podluzhniy (URS)	8.15	Jean-François Bonhème (FRA)	7.85	Hans Baumgartner (FRG)	7.85
Triple jump	Mikhail Bariban (URS)	17.20	Viktor Saneyev (URS)	17.00	Jörg Drehmel (GDR)	16.76
Shot put	Valeriy Voykin (URS)	19.56	Leszek Gajdziński (POL)	19.07	Aleksandr Baryshnikov (URS)	19.01
Discus throw	Viktor Zhurba (URS)	61.60	Gunnar Müller (GDR)	59.72	Ferenc Tégla (HUN)	59.48
Hammer throw	Valentin Dmitriyenko (URS)	72.42	Aleksey Spiridonov (URS)	71.82	Uwe Beyer (FRG)	71.18
Javelin throw	Jānis Zirnis (URS)	80.08	Dmitriy Sitnikov (URS)	79.65	Anthony Hall (USA)	78.36
Decathlon	Ryszard Skowronek (POL)	7965	Mykola Avilov (URS)	7903	Rudolf Sigert (URS)	7825

=== Women's events ===
Event	Gold		Silver		Bronze	
100 metres (wind: -0.6 m/s)	Mona-Lisa Pursiainen (FIN)	11.41	Elfgard Schittenhelm (FRG)	11.62	Ellen Stropahl (GDR)	11.63
200 metres (wind: +0.6 m/s)	Mona-Lisa Pursiainen (FIN)	22.39	Marina Sidorova (URS)	22.72	Ellen Stropahl (GDR)	22.73
400 metres	Nadezhda Kolesnikova (URS)	52.04	Judy Canty (AUS)	52.82	Carmen Trustée (CUB)	53.44
800 metres	Lilyana Tomova (BUL)	1:59.52	Nijolė Sabaitė (URS)	2:00.19	Elżbieta Katolik (POL)	2:00.85
1500 metres	Paola Pigni-Cacchi (ITA)	4:10.69	Glenda Reiser (CAN)	4:12.50	Tonka Petrova (BUL)	4:13.50
100 metres hurdles	Grażyna Rabsztyn (POL)	13.23	Annerose Krumpholz (GDR)	13.38	Natalya Lebedeva (URS)	13.50
4 × 100 metres relay	Soviet Union (URS); Tatyana Chernikova; Lyudmila Zharkova; Marina Sidorova; Nadezhda Besfamilnaya	43.99	Poland (POL); Ewa Długołęcka; Barbara Bakulin; Urszula Styranka; Maria Żukowska	44.42	East Germany (GDR); Annerose Krumpholz; Ellen Stropahl; Bärbel Struppert; Doris Maletzki	44.44
High jump	Virginia Ioan (ROM)	1.84	Jutta Kirst (GDR)	1.84	Galina Filatova (URS); Sara Simeoni (ITA)	1.81
Long jump	Margrit Olfert (GDR)	6.63	Margarita Treinytė (URS)	6.51	Brenda Eisler (CAN)	6.48
Shot put	Nadezhda Chizhova (URS)	20.82 UR	Elena Stoyanova (BUL)	18.64	Faina Melnik (URS)	18.31
Discus throw	Faina Melnik (URS)	64.54	Argentina Menis (ROM)	63.92	Nadezhda Sergeyeva (URS)	59.26
Javelin throw	Svetlana Korolyova (URS)	62.00	Kate Schmidt (USA)	60.34	Lyutviyan Mollova (BUL)	59.04
Pentathlon	Nadiya Tkachenko (URS)	4629	Tatyana Vorokhobko (URS)	4444	Diane Jones (CAN)	4370

== Medal table ==
Rank	Nation	Gold	Silver	Bronze	Total
1	Soviet Union (URS)	17	12	9	38
2	United States (USA)	2	4	4	10
3	Great Britain (GBR)	2	3	1	6
4	Poland (POL)	2	2	3	7
5	Italy (ITA)	2	0	4	6
6	Finland (FIN)	2	0	0	2
7	East Germany (GDR)	1	3	6	10
8	France (FRA)	1	2	0	3
9	Bulgaria (BUL)	1	1	2	4
10	Cuba (CUB)	1	1	1	3
10	Czechoslovakia (TCH)	1	1	1	3
10	Romania (ROM)	1	1	1	3
13	Yugoslavia (YUG)	1	0	0	1
14	West Germany (FRG)	0	2	3	5
15	Canada (CAN)	0	1	3	4
16	Hungary (HUN)	0	1	1	2
17	Australia (AUS)	0	1	0	1
18	Kenya (KEN)	0	0	1	1
Totals (18 entries)		34	35	40	109

== See also ==
- FISU World University Games
- University and college sport
