= List of Norwegian records in athletics =

The following are the national records in athletics in Norway maintained by its national athletics federation: Norges Fri-Idrettsforbund (NFI).

== Outdoor ==
Key to tables: Awaiting ratification Record not kept by NFI Not ratified or later rescinded by NFI

=== Men ===
Event	Record	Athlete	Date	Meet	Place	Ref.
100 m	9.99 (+1.0 m/s)	Jaysuma Saidy Ndure	30 June 2011	Athletissima	Lausanne, Switzerland	
100 m	9.95 (+1.9 m/s) (Note: doubtful wind reading)	Jaysuma Saidy Ndure	7 June 2014	Florø Friidrettsfestival	Florø, Norway	
150 m (straight)	15.75 (−0.3 m/s)	Jonathan Quarcoo	18 May 2018	Great CityGames Manchester	Manchester, United Kingdom	
200 m	19.89 (+1.3 m/s)	Jaysuma Saidy Ndure	23 September 2007	World Athletics Final	Stuttgart, Germany	
200 m (straight)	20.64 (+0.2 m/s)	Jaysuma Saidy Ndure	20 May 2012	Great CityGames Manchester	Manchester, United Kingdom	
300 m	32.19	Andreas Kulseng	11 June 2025	Bislett Games	Oslo, Norway	
400 m	44.39	Håvard Bentdal Ingvaldsen	20 August 2023	World Championships	Budapest, Hungary	
600 m	1:14.56	Tobias Grønstad	5 May 2024	Internationales Läufermeeting	Pliezhausen, Germany	
800 m	1:42.58	Vebjørn Rodal	31 July 1996	Olympic Games	Atlanta, United States	
1000 m	2:16.46	Filip Ingebrigtsen	11 June 2020	Impossible Games	Oslo, Norway	
1500 m	3:26.73	Jakob Ingebrigtsen	12 July 2024	Herculis	Fontvieille, Monaco	
Mile	3:43.73	Jakob Ingebrigtsen	16 September 2023	Prefontaine Classic	Eugene, United States	
Mile (road)	3:59.42	Andreas Fjeld Halvorsen	19 September 2026	World Road Running Championships	Copenhagen, Denmark	
2000 m	4:43.13	Jakob Ingebrigtsen	8 September 2023	Memorial Van Damme	Brussels, Belgium	
3000 m	7:17.55	Jakob Ingebrigtsen	25 August 2024	Kamila Skolimoswka Memorial	Chorzów, Poland	
3 km (road)	8:18	Even Brøndbo Dahl	22 September 2022		Eidsvoll, Norway	
Two miles	7:54.10	Jakob Ingebrigtsen	9 June 2023	Meeting de Paris	Paris, France	
5000 m	12:48.45	Jakob Ingebrigtsen	10 June 2021	Golden Gala	Florence, Italy	
5 km (road)	13:10	Narve Gilje Nordås	4 April 2026		Lille, France	
5 km (road)	12:59	Jakob Ingebrigtsen	19 September 2026	World Road Running Championships	Copenhagen, Denmark	
10,000 m	27:24.78	Sondre Nordstad Moen	31 August 2019	Stadionmila	Kristiansand, Norway	
10 km (road)	27:22	Magnus Tuv Myhre	11 January 2026	10K Valencia Ibercaja by Kiprun	Valencia, Spain	
15 km (road)	42:26+	Sondre Nordstad Moen	22 October 2017	Valencia Half Marathon	Valencia, Spain	
15 km (road)	42:25+	Sondre Nordstad Moen	15 September 2019	Copenhagen Half Marathon	Copenhagen, Denmark	
20,000 m (track)	56:51.60+	Sondre Nordstad Moen	7 August 2020	Stadionmila	Kristiansand, Norway	
20 km (road)	56:42+	Sondre Nordstad Moen	22 October 2017	Valencia Half Marathon	Valencia, Spain	
Half marathon	59:48	Sondre Nordstad Moen	22 October 2017	Valencia Half Marathon	Valencia, Spain	
One hour	21131 m	Sondre Nordstad Moen	7 August 2020	Stadionmila	Kristiansand, Norway	
25,000 m (track)	1:12:46.51	Sondre Nordstad Moen	11 June 2020	Impossible Games	Oslo, Norway	
25 km (road)	1:14:16+ (Note: by official result source; 1:14:15 by NFI source)	Awet Kibrab	7 December 2025	Valencia Marathon	Valencia, Spain	
30 km (road)	1:28:51+ (Note: by official result source; 1:28:50 by NFI source)	Awet Kibrab	7 December 2025	Valencia Marathon	Valencia, Spain	
Marathon	2:04:24	Awet Kibrab	7 December 2025	Valencia Marathon	Valencia, Spain	
50 km (road)	2:48:48	Ebrahim Abdulaziz	11 February 2023		Oslo, Norway	
100 km (road)	6:19:09	Sebastian Håkansson	27 August 2022		Bernau, Germany	
24 hours (road)	285.513 km	Jo Inge Norum	18–19 October 2025	IAU 24 Hour World Championship	Albi, France	
110 m hurdles	13.42 (+1.7 m/s)	Vladimir Vukicevic	14 August 2021		La Chaux-de-Fonds, Switzerland	
200 m hurdles	23.28 (+1.7 m/s)	Erlend Sæterstøl	15 September 1995		Bergen, Norway	
300 m hurdles	32.67	Karsten Warholm	12 June 2025	Bislett Games	Oslo, Norway	
400 m hurdles	45.94	Karsten Warholm	3 August 2021	Olympic Games	Tokyo, Japan	
2000 m steeplechase	5:26.18	Jim Svenøy	24 May 1999		Elnesvågen, Norway	
3000 m steeplechase	8:12.05	Jim Svenøy	22 August 1997	Memorial Van Damme	Brussels, Belgium	
High jump	2.36 m	Steinar Hoen	1 July 1997	Bislett Games	Oslo, Norway	
Pole vault	6.00 m	Sondre Guttormsen	24 July 2026	Norwegian Championships	Trondheim, Norway	
Pole vault	6.00 m	Sondre Guttormsen	23 August 2026	Kamila Skolimowska Memorial	Chorzów, Poland	
Pole vault	6.00 m	Sondre Guttormsen	27 August 2026	Weltklasse Zürich	Zurich, Switzerland	
Long jump	8.21 m A (−0.8 m/s)	Ingar Bratseth-Kiplesund	29 April 2023	Botswana Golden Grand Prix	Gaborone, Botswana	
Triple jump	17.27 m (+1.3 m/s)	Ketill Hanstveit	7 August 1999		Byrkjelo, Norway	
Shot put	21.22 m	Lars Arvid Nilsen	6 June 1986		Indianapolis, United States	
Discus throw	69.62 m	Knut Hjeltnes	25 May 1985		San Jose, United States	
Hammer throw	81.58 m	Eivind Henriksen	4 August 2021	Olympic Games	Tokyo, Japan	
Javelin throw	91.59 m	Andreas Thorkildsen	2 June 2006	Bislett Games	Oslo, Norway	
Decathlon	8909 pts	Sander Skotheim	31 May – 1 June 2025	Hypo-Meeting	Götzis, Austria	
Decathlon	100m (wind) / Long jump (wind) / Shot put / High jump / 400m / 110m H (wind) / Discus / Pole vault / Javelin / 1500m; 10.70 (+0.7 m/s) / 8.06 m (+0.7 m/s) / 13.98 m / 2.15 m / 47.47 / 14.12 (−1.2 m/s) / 49.18 m / 5.10 m / 61.46 m / 4:23.88					
5000 m walk (track)	18:32.46	Erik Tysse	10 August 2007		Askim, Norway	
10 km walk (road)	37:33	Erik Tysse	27 August 2006		Hildesheim, Germany	
20 km walk (road)	1:19:11	Erik Tysse	10 May 2008	IAAF World Race Walking Cup	Cheboksary, Russia	
30 km walk (road)	2:07:42	Håvard Haukenes	19 December 2020	Irish Open Championships	Cork, Ireland	
35 km walk (road)	2:33:59+ (Note: not ratified by NFI but recognised by World Athletics)	Trond Nymark	21 August 2009	World Championships	Berlin, Germany	
50 km walk (road)	3:41:16	Trond Nymark	21 August 2009	World Championships	Berlin, Germany	
4 × 100 m relay	38.86	Norway; Per Tinius Fremstad-Waldron; Jacob Vaula; Mathias Hove Johansen; Andreas Ofstad Kulseng	28 June 2025	European Team Championships	Maribor, Slovenia	
4 × 200 m relay	1:26.03	IL Skjalg; Trond Lindanger; Helge Farbrot; Per Ivar Sivle; Kjell Egil Rugland	30 August 1994		Sola, Norway	
Swedish relay	1:51.02	Moelven IL; Sondre Rudi; Carl Kåshagen; Alexander Løvik Nyheim; Håvard Bentdal Ingvaldsen	8 July 2023	Norwegian Championships	Jessheim, Norway	
4 × 400 m relay	3:06.67	Norway; Steinar Mo; Göte Lundblad; Per Rom; Richard Simonsen	14 August 1971		Helsinki, Finland	
4 × 400 m relay	3:06.67	Norway; Quincy Douglas; Vebjørn Rodal; Lars Eirik Ulseth; Bjørn Arild Bøhleng	29 June 1996		Bergen, Norway	
4 × 800 m relay	7:22.6	IL Tjalve; Åge Henriksen; Bo Breigan; Morten Jurs; Espen Borge	19 August 1986	Bislett Games	Oslo, Norway	
4 × 1500 m relay	15:15.37	IL Gular; Bjørn Steinar Økland; Kjell S. Sandgrind; Morten Frank Otto Meinseth; Ove Talsnes	24 May 1987		Trondheim, Norway	

=== Women ===
Event	Record	Athlete	Date	Meet	Place	Ref.
100 m	11.10 (+1.2 m/s)	Ezinne Okparaebo	4 August 2012	Olympic Games	London, United Kingdom	
200 m	22.55 (+1.6 m/s)	Henriette Jæger	25 July 2026	Norwegian Championships	Trondheim, Norway	
300 m	35.46	Henriette Jæger	22 May 2024	Trond Mohn Games	Bergen, Norway	
400 m	49.04	Henriette Jæger	15 August 2026	European Athletics Championships	Birmingham, United Kingdom	
400 m	48.78	Henriette Jæger	18 September 2026	Athlos	London, United Kingdom	
600 m	1:28.14 Wo	Malin Nyfors	5 May 2024	Internationales Läufermeeting	Pliezhausen, Germany	
800 m	1:58.10	Hedda Hynne	15 September 2020	Galà dei Castelli	Bellinzona, Italy	
1000 m	2:36.7 h	Ingvill Måkestad Bovim	4 June 2011	Florø Friidrettsfestival	Florø, Norway	
1500 m	4:00.55	Grete Waitz	3 September 1978		Prague, Czechoslovakia	
Mile	4:26.23	Karoline Bjerkeli Grøvdal	9 June 2016	Bislett Games	Oslo, Norway	
2000 m	5:41.01	Karoline Bjerkeli Grøvdal	2 June 2018		Florø, Norway	
3000 m	8:27.02	Karoline Bjerkeli Grøvdal	30 May 2024	Bislett Games	Oslo, Norway	
5000 m	14:31.07	Karoline Bjerkeli Grøvdal	16 June 2022	Bislett Games	Oslo, Norway	
5 km (road)	14:58 Mx	Karoline Bjerkeli Grøvdal	1 October 2022		Jessheim, Norway	
5 km (road)	14:39 Mx (Note: course not officially certified for record purposes, probably short course)	Karoline Bjerkeli Grøvdal	1 May 2021		Disenå, Norway	
5 km (road)	14:52 Mx	Karoline Bjerkeli Grøvdal	31 December 2022	Cursa dels Nassos	Barcelona, Spain	
10,000 m	30:13.74	Ingrid Kristiansen	5 July 1986	Bislett Games	Oslo, Norway	
10 km (road)	30:32	Karoline Bjerkeli Grøvdal	17 October 2020	Hytteplanmila 10 km	Høle, Norway	
15 km (road)	47:17	Ingrid Kristiansen	21 November 1987	IAAF World Women's Road Race Championships	Monaco	
20 km (road)	1:03:32	Karoline Bjerkeli Grøvdal	15 September 2024	Copenhagen Half Marathon	Copenhagen, Denmark	
Half marathon	1:06:40	Ingrid Kristiansen	5 April 1987	Norwegian Half Marathon Championships	Sandnes, Norway	
25 km (road)	1:22:28	Grete Waitz	19 March 1986		Paderborn, West Germany	
Marathon	2:21.06	Ingrid Kristiansen	21 April 1985	London Marathon	London, United Kingdom	
24 hours (road)	261.170 m	Therese Falk	21 November 2021		Oslo, Norway	
100 m hurdles	12.72 (+0.2 m/s)	Isabelle Pedersen	22 July 2018	Diamond League	London, United Kingdom	
200 m hurdles	26.11 (−0.9 m/s)	Line Kloster	11 June 2020	Impossible Games	Oslo, Norway	
300 m hurdles	38.97	Line Kloster	27 May 2018		Lillestrøm, Norway	
400 m hurdles	53.91	Line Kloster	3 July 2022	Resisprint International	La Chaux-de-Fonds, Switzerland	
2000 m steeplechase	6:21.39	Karoline Bjerkeli Grøvdal	10 August 2008		Stavanger, Norway	
3000 m steeplechase	9:13.35	Karoline Bjerkeli Grøvdal	26 August 2017	Norwegian Championships	Sandnes, Norway	
High jump	2.01 m	Hanne Haugland	13 August 1997	Weltklasse Zürich	Zürich, Switzerland	
Pole vault	4.73 m	Lene Retzius	10 August 2025	Flight Circus Meet	Düsseldorf, Germany	
Long jump	6.68 m (+1.3 m/s)	Margrethe Renstrøm	27 July 2010	European Championships	Barcelona, Spain	
Triple jump	13.83 m (+1.2 m/s)	Lene Espegren	5 June 1999		Pula, Croatia	
Triple jump	13.83 m (+1.8 m/s)	Lene Espegren	6 August 1999		Byrkjelo, Norway	
Shot put	17.11 m	Katarina Sederholm	4 July 1998		Hämeenkyrö, Finland	
Discus throw	69.68 m	Mette Bergmann	27 May 1995		Florø, Norway	
Hammer throw	72.10 m	Beatrice Nedberge Llano	9 June 2022	NCAA Division I Championships	Eugene, United States	
Javelin throw	69.48 m	Trine Hattestad	28 July 2000	Bislett Games	Oslo, Norway	
Heptathlon	6226 pts	Ida Marcussen	25–26 August 2007	World Championships	Osaka, Japan	
Heptathlon	100m H (wind) / High jump / Shot put / 200m (wind) / Long jump (wind) / Javelin / 800m; 14.16 (−0.8 m/s) / 1.68 m / 13.00 m / 24.59 (−0.2 m/s) / 6.47 m (+0.3 m/s) / 51.02 m / 2:13.69					
3000 m walk (track)	12:00.53	Kjersti Plätzer	31 July 2009		Lillehammer, Norway	
5 km walk (road)	19:46	Kjersti Plätzer	27 August 2006	Internationaler Geher-Cup	Hildesheim, Germany	
20 km walk (road)	1:27:07	Kjersti Plätzer	21 August 2008	Olympic Games	Beijing, China	
4 × 100 m relay	43.94	Norway; Isabelle Pedersen; Ida Bakke Hansen; Elisabeth Slettum; Ezinne Okparaebo	20 June 2015	European Team Championships – Super League	Cheboksary, Russia	
4 × 200 m relay	1:36.50	Norway; Marit Eriksen Toogood; Astrid Brun; Anne Marie Stenbro Dombu; Marit Eriksen Toogood	9 July 1982		Paris, France	
Swedish relay	2:06.92	Norway; Lena Solli Reimann; Karin Solbakken; Mona Karin Riisnæs; Sølvi Olsen Meinseth	5 June 1993		Portsmouth, United Kingdom	
4 × 400 m relay	3:23.71	Norway; Josefine Tomine Eriksen; Amalie Iuel; Astri Ertzgaard; Henriette Jæger	21 September 2025	World Championships	Tokyo, Japan	
4 × 800 m relay	8:37.50	Norway; Siri Bjelland; Karin Bonde; Oddrun Mosling; Heidi Vien	18 June 1977		Bourges, France	

=== Mixed ===
Event	Record	Athlete	Date	Meet	Place	Ref.
4 × 100 m relay	45.57	Tjalve; Lucas Eggen; Levi Kodjo; Oda Lier; Hedda Endsjø	12 June 2025	Bislett Games	Oslo, Norway	
4 × 400 m relay	3:09.62	Norway; Karsten Warholm; Amalie Iuel; Andreas Ofstad Kulseng; Henriette Jæger	10 August 2026	European Athletics Championships	Birmingham, United Kingdom	

== Indoor ==
=== Men ===
Event	Record	Athlete	Date	Meet	Place	Ref.
60 m	6.55	Jaysuma Saidy Ndure	24 February 2008	Indoor Flanders Meeting	Ghent, Belgium	
100 m	10.19	Jaysuma Saidy Ndure	15 February 2014		Florø, Norway	
200 m	20.51	Geir Moen	19 February 1995	Meeting Pas de Calais	Liévin, France	
200 m	20.47 (Note: disqualified due to lane infringement)	Geir Moen	23 February 1997	Aviva Indoor Grand Prix	Birmingham, United Kingdom	
400 m	45.05	Karsten Warholm	2 March 2019	European Championships	Glasgow, United Kingdom	
600 m	1:15.86	Vebjørn Rodal	24 January 1998		Stange, Norway	
800 m	1:46.28	Vebjørn Rodal	23 February 1997	AVIVA Indoor Grand Prix	Birmingham, United Kingdom	
1000 m	2:20.96 (Note: by result source; 2:20.86 by federation source)	Thomas Roth	17 February 2018		Hvam, Norway	
1500 m	3:29.63+	Jakob Ingebrigtsen	13 February 2025	Meeting Hauts-de-France Pas-de-Calais	Liévin, France	
Mile	3:45.14	Jakob Ingebrigtsen	13 February 2025	Meeting Hauts-de-France Pas-de-Calais	Liévin, France	
2000 m	5:03.41	Ferdinand Edman	10 February 2024	Meeting Hauts-de-France Pas-de-Calais	Liévin, France	
3000 m	7:39.05	Narve Gilje Nordås	7 February 2025	INIT Indoor Meeting Karlsruhe	Karlsruhe, Germany	
5000 m	13:52.6	Arne Kvalheim	16 February 1974		Berlin, West Germany	
60 m hurdles	7.69	Vladimir Vukicevic	1 March 2013	European Championships	Gothenburg, Sweden	
110 m hurdles	13.95	Gaute Gundersen	4 February 1998		Tampere, Finland	
300 m hurdles	34.26 OT ^{[WB]}	Karsten Warholm	10 February 2018	Avoimet Pirkanmaan	Tampere, Finland	
2000 m steeplechase	5:34.2 h	Sverre Sørnes	5 February 1972		Gothenburg, Sweden	
High jump	2.36 m (Note: outdoor mark ratified as absolute record)	Steinar Hoen	12 February 1994		Balingen, Germany	
High jump	2.36 m	Steinar Hoen	3 March 1995		Berlin, Germany	
Pole vault	6.06 m	Sondre Guttormsen	7 March 2026	Perche Elite Tour	Rouen, France	
Long jump	7.87 m	Henrik Flåtnes	28 January 2022	Indoor Meeting Karlsruhe	Karlsruhe, Germany	
Standing long jump	3.71 m	Arne Tvervaag	11 November 1968		Noresund, Norway	
Triple jump	16.96 m	Sigurd Njerve	18 February 1996		Borlänge, Sweden	
Shot put	21.09 m	Marcus Thomsen	1 February 2021		Växjö, Sweden	
Weight throw	24.46 m	Thomas Mardal	11 March 2021	NCAA Division I Championships	Fayetteville, United States	
Discus throw	61.67 m	Sven Martin Skagestad	11 February 2017	Norden Kampen	Tampere, Finland	
Heptathlon	6558 pts	Sander Skotheim	7–8 March 2025	European Championships	Apeldoorn, Netherlands	
Heptathlon	60m / Long jump / Shot put / High jump / 60m H / Pole vault / 1000m; 6.93 / 7.95 m / 14.39 m / 2.19 m / 8.04 / 5.10 m / 2:32.72					
5000 m walk	18:49.10	Erling Andersen	6 March 1988	European Championships	Budapest, Hungary	
4 × 200 m relay	1:24.59	Norway; Karsten Warholm; Jonathan Quarcoo; Even Meinseth; Jaysuma Saidy Ndure	13 February 2016		Växjö, Sweden	
4 × 400 m relay						
4 × 800 m relay						

=== Women ===
Event	Record	Athlete	Date	Meet	Place	Ref.	Video
60 m	7.10	Ezinne Okparaebo	8 March 2015	European Championships	Prague, Czech Republic		
100 m	11.42	Ezinne Okparaebo	21 February 2009		Florø, Norway		
200 m	22.99	Henriette Jæger	20 January 2024		Bærum, Norway		
400 m	50.44	Henriette Jæger	16 February 2025	Copernicus Cup	Toruń, Poland		
600 y	1:19.56	Amalie Iuel	21 January 2017	Rod McCravy Invitational	Lexington, United States		
600 m	1:28.27 A	Josefine Eriksen	12 February 2022	Don Kirby Invitational	Albuquerque, United States		
800 m	2:00.77	Pernille Karlsen Antonsen	20 March 2026	World Championships	Toruń, Poland		
1000 m	2:43.47	Anne Gine Løvnes	28 January 2024	DZLA Meeting	Wrocław, Poland		
1500 m	4:08.65	Ingvill Måkestad	22 February 2011	XL Galan	Stockholm, Sweden		
Mile	4:28.49	Ingvill Måkestad	20 February 2010	Aviva Indoor Grand Prix	Birmingham, United Kingdom		
3000 m	8:44.68	Karoline Bjerkeli Grøvdal	10 February 2019	Nordenkampen International Match	Bærum, Norway		
Two miles	10:09.48 OT	Tove Lutdal	28 February 1986		Lincoln, United States		
5000 m	16:12.28	Siri Alfheim	8 March 2002	NCAA Division I Championships	Fayetteville, United States		
60 m hurdles	7.83	Christina Vukićević	4 March 2011	European Championships	Paris, France		
100 m hurdles	14.03	Hilde Fredriksen	12 January 1985		Drammen, Norway		
300 m hurdles	40.09 OT ^{[WB]}	Stine Tomb	5 February 2011	Finland-Sweden-Norway Indoor Match	Tampere, Finland		
High jump	2.00 m	Hanne Haugland	17 February 1995		Spała, Poland		
High jump	2.00 m	Hanne Haugland	8 March 1997	World Championships	Paris, France		
Pole vault	4.54 m	Lene Onsrud Retzius	28 January 2024	Meeting de L'Eure	Val-de-Reuil, France		
Long jump	6.51 m	Berit Berthelsen	12 March 1967		Prague, Czechoslovakia		
Triple jump	13.65 m	Oda Utsi Onstad	2 February 2019		Haugesund, Norway		
Shot put	17.25 m (Note: outdoor mark ratified as absolute record)	Katariina Sederholm-Hoff	7 February 1998		Stange, Norway		
Weight throw	21.20 m	Helene Ingvaldsen	26 January 2018	Razorback Invitational	Fayetteville, United States		
Discus throw	60.77 m Mx	Ola Isene	1 February 2019	ISTAF Indoor	Berlin, Germany		
Javelin throw	64.36 m	Trine Hattestad	25 February 1986		Luleå, Sweden		
Pentathlon	4471 pts	Henriette Jæger	21 February 2021	Norwegian Championships	Bærum, Norway		
Pentathlon	60m H / High jump / Shot put / Long jump / 800m; 8.39 / 1.76 m / 12.44 m / 6.02 m / 2:10.60						
3000 m walk	11:59.3 h	Kjersti Plätzer	1 February 2004		Liévin, France		
4 × 200 m relay	1:35.60	Norway; Ezinne Okparaebo; Astrid Mangen Cederkvist; Emily Rose Norum; Tonje Fjellet Kristiansen	13 February 2016		Växjö, Sweden		
4 × 400 m relay							
4 × 800 m relay							
