= 1974 European Athletics Championships – Men's 5000 metres =

Men's 5000 metres at the European Athletics Championships

The men's 5000 metres at the 1974 European Athletics Championships was held in Rome, Italy, at Stadio Olimpico on 6 and 8 September 1974.

== Medalists ==
Gold	Brendan Foster; Great Britain
Silver	Manfred Kuschmann; East Germany
Bronze	Lasse Virén; Finland

== Results ==
=== Final ===
8 September This final was a fast race from the start, with Britain's Brendan Foster leading it all the way. He passed 1,000 metres in 2:39.2. In the early laps, Belgium's Willy Polleunis closely followed Foster, but soon after 1,000 metres the Belgian started to drop from the Briton's pace, and became the first runner to lose contact with the lead group. Polleunis would finish fifteenth and last in this final. Foster kept up the fast and steady pace, passing 2,000 metres in 5:20.2. Finland's Lasse Viren had already moved behind Foster during the second kilometre, with East Germany's Manfred Kuschmann running third. At 2,800 metres, Foster suddenly surged, and only Viren tried to keep up with him. The British runner passed 3,000 metres in 8:01.2. Viren slowed down before 3,100 metres, determined to conserve his strength to fight for the silver and bronze medals instead. Therefore Foster ran the final's last laps in an unchallenged lead, while Viren let the main group of runners catch him. On the last back straight, Kuschmann suddenly sprinted into the second place, followed by Viren, the Netherlands' Jos Hermens, Norway's Arne Kvalheim, and Romania's Ilie Floroiu. At the start of the final bend, Hermens passed Viren. However, on the final straight, the Finn was able to pass the Dutchman to claim the bronze medal behind Foster, who had already finished the race in 13:17.2, and Kuschmann who sprinted to the finish line in the second place. (See Raevuori, Antero, Lasse Viren: The Gilded Spikes / Kullatut piikkarit (Finland, c. 1976); https://www.youtube.com/watch?v=tD3KLV7R4jA EUROPEI DI ROMA 1974 5000 FOSTER.)

Rank	Name	Nationality	Time	Notes
1st place, gold medalist(s)	Brendan Foster	Great Britain	13:17.21	CR
2nd place, silver medalist(s)	Manfred Kuschmann	East Germany	13:23.93	NR
3rd place, bronze medalist(s)	Lasse Virén	Finland	13:24.57	
4	Jos Hermens	Netherlands	13:25.51	NR
5	Ilie Floroiu	Romania	13:27.12	NR
6	Arne Kvalheim	Norway	13:27.23	
7	Stanislav Hoffman	Czechoslovakia	13:29.03	
8	Klaus-Peter Hildenbrand	West Germany	13:31.93	
9	Vladimir Zatonskiy	Soviet Union	13:39.6	
10	Petar Svet	Yugoslavia	13:41.6	
11	Knut Børø	Norway	13:45.8	
12	Pavel Pěnkava	Czechoslovakia	14:00.6	
13	Pekka Päivärinta	Finland	14:14.2	
14	Knut Kvalheim	Norway	14:19.0	
15	Willy Polleunis	Belgium	14:23.2	

=== Heats ===
6 September

==== Heat 1 ====
Rank	Name	Nationality	Time	Notes
1	Willy Polleunis	Belgium	13:38.6	Q
2	Knut Børø	Norway	13:38.6	Q
3	Pavel Pěnkava	Czechoslovakia	13:38.8	Q
4	Manfred Kuschmann	East Germany	13:39.2	Q
5	Dave Black	Great Britain	13:41.8	
6	Fernando Cerrada	Spain	13:56.8	
7	Werner Meier	Switzerland	14:05.4	
8	Mihaíl Koúsis	Greece	14:07.0	
	Aniceto Simões	Portugal	DNF	

==== Heat 2 ====
Rank	Name	Nationality	Time	Notes
1	Pekka Päivärinta	Finland	13:56.6	Q
2	Knut Kvalheim	Norway	13:56.8	Q
3	Stanislav Hoffman	Czechoslovakia	13:59.4	Q
4	Vladimir Zatonskiy	Soviet Union	14:01.4	Q
5	Henryk Nogala	Poland	14:07.0	
6	Chris Stewart	Great Britain	14:17.2	
7	Eamonn Coghlan	Ireland	14:29.6	
	Léon Schots	Belgium	DNF	
	Anders Gärderud	Sweden	DNS	
	Carlos Lopes	Portugal	DNS	

==== Heat 3 ====
Rank	Name	Nationality	Time	Notes
1	Brendan Foster	Great Britain	13:37.0	Q
2	Jos Hermens	Netherlands	13:37.4	Q
3	Knut Kvalheim	Norway	13:37.8	Q
4	Lasse Virén	Finland	13:38.2	Q
5	Ilie Floroiu	Romania	13:39.0	q
6	Petar Svet	Yugoslavia	13:40.8	q
7	Klaus-Peter Hildenbrand	West Germany	13:41.4	q
8	Christian Cairoche	France	13:59.6	
	Eddy Van Mullem	Belgium	DNF	
	Dan Glans	Sweden	DNS	

== Participation ==
According to an unofficial count, 26 athletes from 18 countries participated in the event.

- Belgium (3)
- Czechoslovakia (2)
- East Germany (1)
- Finland (2)
- France (1)
- Greece (1)
- Ireland (1)
- Netherlands (1)
- Norway (3)
- Poland (1)
- Portugal (1)
- Romania (1)
- Soviet Union (1)
- Spain (1)
- Switzerland (1)
- Great Britain (3)
- West Germany (1)
- Yugoslavia (1)
