= 1974 European Athletics Championships – Men's 10,000 metres =

Men's 10,000 metres at the European Athletics Championships

The men's 10,000 metres at the 1974 European Athletics Championships was held in Rome, Italy, at Stadio Olimpico on 2 September 1974.

== Medalists ==
Gold	Manfred Kuschmann; East Germany
Silver	Tony Simmons; Great Britain
Bronze	Giuseppe Cindolo; Italy

== Results ==
=== Final ===
2 September

Rank	Name	Nationality	Time	Notes
1st place, gold medalist(s)	Manfred Kuschmann	East Germany	28:25.75	
2nd place, silver medalist(s)	Tony Simmons	Great Britain	28:25.79	
3rd place, bronze medalist(s)	Giuseppe Cindolo	Italy	28:27.05	
4	Bronisław Malinowski	Poland	28:27.95	
5	Nikolay Puklakov	Soviet Union	28:29.14	
6	Knut Børø	Norway	28:29.19	
7	Lasse Virén	Finland	28:29.23	
8	Mariano Haro	Spain	28:36.00	
9	Dave Black	Great Britain	28:36.6	
10	Bernie Ford	Great Britain	28:37.4	
11	Karel Lismont	Belgium	28:41.2	
12	Pierre Liardet	France	28:42.8	
13	Stanislav Hoffman	Czechoslovakia	28:44.4	
14	Ilie Floroiu	Romania	28:51.8	
15	Henryk Nogala	Poland	29:04.8	
16	Peter Suchán	Czechoslovakia	29:06.0	
17	Arne Risa	Norway	29:07.4	
18	Petar Svet	Yugoslavia	29:08.4	
19	Pekka Päivärinta	Finland	29:21.6	
20	Josef Jánský	Czechoslovakia	29:23.2	
21	Karl-Heinz Leiteritz	East Germany	29:32.6	
22	Jos Hermens	Netherlands	29:41.0	
23	Edward Łęgowski	Poland	29:45.6	
24	Mihaíl Koúsis	Greece	29:49.6	
	Valentin Zotov	Soviet Union	DNF	
	Willy Polleunis	Belgium	DNF	
	Franco Fava	Italy	DNF	
	Marc Smet	Belgium	DNF	
	Detlef Uhlemann	West Germany	DNF	
	Carlos Lopes	Portugal	DNF	
	Per Halle	Norway	DNF	
	Musa Kalemoğlu	Turkey	DNS	
	Aniceto Simões	Portugal	DNS	

== Participation ==
According to an unofficial count, 31 athletes from 17 countries participated in the event.

- Belgium (3)
- Czechoslovakia (3)
- East Germany (2)
- Finland (2)
- France (1)
- Greece (1)
- Italy (2)
- Netherlands (1)
- Norway (3)
- Poland (3)
- Portugal (1)
- Romania (1)
- Soviet Union (2)
- Spain (1)
- Great Britain (3)
- West Germany (1)
- Yugoslavia (1)
