= Athletics at the 1976 Summer Olympics – Men's 5000 metres =

Men's 5000 metres at the Games of the XXI Olympiad
- Venue: Olympic Stadium
- Dates: 28 July 1976 (heats); 30 July 1976 (final)
- Competitors: 35 from 24 nations
- Winning time: 13:24.76

Medalists
1st place, gold medalist(s)		Lasse Virén; Finland
2nd place, silver medalist(s)		Dick Quax; New Zealand
3rd place, bronze medalist(s)		Klaus-Peter Hildenbrand; West Germany

Official Video Highlights

These are the official results of the Men's 5.000 metres at the 1976 Summer Olympics in Montreal, Quebec, Canada. The final was held on Friday July 30, 1976, after the three qualifying heats were run on Wednesday July 28, 1976.

== Summary ==
At first, the Soviet Union's Enn Sellik led this final, but then he let the other Soviet runner, Boris Kuznetsov, pass him. Before 400 metres, one of the pre-race favourites, Britain's Brendan Foster, took the lead. He led the field through 1,000 metres in 2:41.25 and at 2,000 metres in 5:26.39. After 2,100 metres, the three-time Olympic champion Lasse Virén of Finland passed Foster, but surprisingly slowed the pace down. He jogged the next two laps in the lead, passing 3,000 metres in 8:16.23. At once after 3,000 metres, Foster accelerated into the lead, sprinting the next 200 metres in about 30 seconds. After that burst of speed, he slowed down, and was passed by West Germany's Klaus-Peter Hildenbrand before 3,400 metres. At that point, Norway's Knut Kvalheim rose to the second place. Around 3,700 metres, Finland's Pekka Päivärinta dropped from the leading group. Before 3,800 metres, Virén accelerated into the second place. After 3,900 metres, Hildenbrand let Virén pass him on purpose. At 4,000 metres, Virén led in 10:55.41. Paul Geis of the United States lost touch with the leading group. After 4,100 metres, also Belgium's Willy Polleunis dropped from Virén's pace. Around 4,250 metres, Kuznetsov tripped on the left leg of New Zealand's Rodney Dixon, and fell to the track, unable to continue the race because of his injury. Due to this incident, Sellik, West Germany's Detlef Uhlemann and Norway's Knut Kvalheim began to drop from the leading group. Portugal's Aniceto Silva Simoes caught the six leaders before 4,400 metres. On the following home straight, Polleunis passed Sellik and began to approach Kvalheim and Uhlemann. At 4,600 metres, Virén led the race, followed by Britain's Ian Stewart and Foster, New Zealand's Dixon, West Germany's Hildenbrand, New Zealand's Dick Quax, and Portugal's Simoes. The Portuguese runner dropped from Virén's pace in the front bend, while Polleunis accelerated past Uhlemann and Kvalheim. On the final back straight, Virén visibly picked up his speed, dropping Stewart from the second place to the sixth place by 4,800 metres. At that point, Virén led the race by around half a metre, threatened by Dixon and Hildenbrand. Foster was sprinting in the fourth place, followed by Quax. On the final bend, Quax furiously kicked past Foster, Dixon and Hildenbrand, and drew nearly level with Virén before the home straight. The Finnish Olympic champion was still able to accelerate, however, leaving Quax with the silver medal. Hildenbrand assured the bronze medal for himself by lunging across the finish line, relegating Dixon in the fourth place. Foster lost to Dixon by nearly 0.7 seconds, finishing fifth. On the final bend, Polleunis had kicked past Stewart, but on the home straight, he was unable to seriously threaten any of the five leading runners. (Matti Hannus, The Montreal Olympic Book / Montrealin olympiateos, Finland, 1976; Antero Raevuori, Lasse Virén - The Guilded Spikes / Kullatut piikkarit, Finland, 1976; three YouTube videos on this final.) (See also this final race's full video: 1976 Montreal Olympics 5000m from Arthur Lydiard https://www.youtube.com/watch?v=t3PehlOMyAM&t=637s.)

== Final ==
RANK	FINAL	TIME
	Lasse Virén (FIN)	13:24.76
	Dick Quax (NZL)	13:25.16
	Klaus-Peter Hildenbrand (FRG)	13:25.38
4.	Rod Dixon (NZL)	13:25.50
5.	Brendan Foster (GBR)	13:26.19
6.	Willy Polleunis (BEL)	13:26.99
7.	Ian Stewart (GBR)	13:27.65
8.	Aniceto Simões (POR)	13:29.38
9.	Knut Kvalheim (NOR)	13:30.33
10.	Detlef Uhlemann (FRG)	13:31.07
11.	Enn Sellik (URS)	13:36.72
12.	Paul Geis (USA)	13:42.51
13.	Pekka Päivärinta (FIN)	13:46.61
—	Boris Kuznetsov (URS)	DNF

== Qualifying heats ==
RANK	HEAT 1	TIME
1.	Dick Quax (NZL)	13:30.85
2.	Paul Geis (USA)	13:32.36
3.	Boris Kuznetsov (URS)	13:32.78
4.	Lasse Virén (FIN)	13:33.39
5.	Jean-Marie Conrath (FRA)	13:34.39
6.	Luis Hernández (MEX)	13:36.42
7.	Ilie Floroiu (ROU)	13:37.09
8.	Toshiaki Kamata (JPN)	13:38.22
9.	Dave Black (GBR)	13:39.37
10.	Edmundo Warnke (CHI)	13:39.69
11.	Edward Leddy (IRL)	13:40.54
12.	Fernando Cerrada (ESP)	13:43.89
13.	Dieudonné LaMothe (HAI)	18:50.07
—	Emiel Puttemans (BEL)	DNF

RANK	HEAT 2	TIME
1.	Willy Polleunis (BEL)	13:45.24
2.	Pekka Päivärinta (FIN)	13:45.77
3.	Klaus-Peter Hildenbrand (FRG)	13:45.85
4.	Ian Stewart (GBR)	13:45.94
5.	Rodolfo Gómez (MEX)	13:46.23
6.	Grant McLaren (CAN)	13:46.40
7.	Duncan MacDonald (USA)	13:47.14
8.	Domingo Tibaduiza (COL)	13:49.49
9.	Venanzio Ortis (ITA)	13:52.40
10.	Hossein Rabbi (IRI)	14:47.12
11.	John Kokinai (PNG)	14:58.33
—	David Fitzsimons (AUS)	DNS
—	Carlos Lopes (POR)	DNS
—	Knut Børø (NOR)	DNS

RANK	HEAT 3	TIME
1.	Brendan Foster (GBR)	13:20.34
2.	Rod Dixon (NZL)	13:20.48
3.	Knut Kvalheim (NOR)	13:20.60
4.	Enn Sellik (URS)	13:20.81
5.	Detlef Uhlemann (FRG)	13:21.08
6.	Aniceto Simões (POR)	13:21.93
7.	Lasse Orimus (FIN)	13:23.43
8.	Marc Smet (BEL)	13:23.76
9.	Dick Buerkle (USA)	13:29.01
10.	Jacques Boxberger (FRA)	13:36.94
11.	Markus Ryffel (SUI)	13:46.07
—	Mohamed Benbaraka (MAR)	DNS
—	Shetwy Al-Bishy (KSA)	DNS
—	José Andrade da Silva (BRA)	DNS
