= Espen Borge =

Norwegian runner

Espen Borge (born 8 September 1961) is a retired Norwegian runner who specialized in 1500 metres and 3000 metres steeplechase. He represented IF Hellas and IK Tjalve.

He finished seventh in 1500 m at the 1989 European Indoor Championships. In addition he competed at the 1987 World Championships and the 1989 World Cross Country Championships without success. He became Norwegian champion in 800 m in 1984 and 1986 and in 1500 m in 1987, 1988 and 1991.

Borge is from Drammen, Norway. He was initially an All-American for the Wyoming Cowboys track and field team, finishing 6th in the 800 m at the 1984 NCAA Indoor Track and Field Championships. In 1985 and 1986, Borge transferred to the University of Arkansas where he finished 3rd in the 1500 metres at the 1986 NCAA Outdoor Championships, the primary college athletics competition in the US.

== Personal bests ==
- 800 metres - 1:47.41 min (1984) - fourteenth among Norwegian 800 m runners.
- 1500 metres - 3:38.74 min (1987) - sixth among Norwegian 1500 m runners, only behind Henrik Ingebrigtsen, Lars Martin Kaupang, Vebjørn Rodal, Knut Kvalheim and Arne Kvalheim.
- 3000 m steeplechase - 8:23.11 min (1987) - Norwegian record until June 1995, third among Norwegian 3000 m steeplechasers, only behind Jim Svenøy and Bjørnar Ustad Kristensen.
