= Ædwen's brooch =

11th-century silver brooch

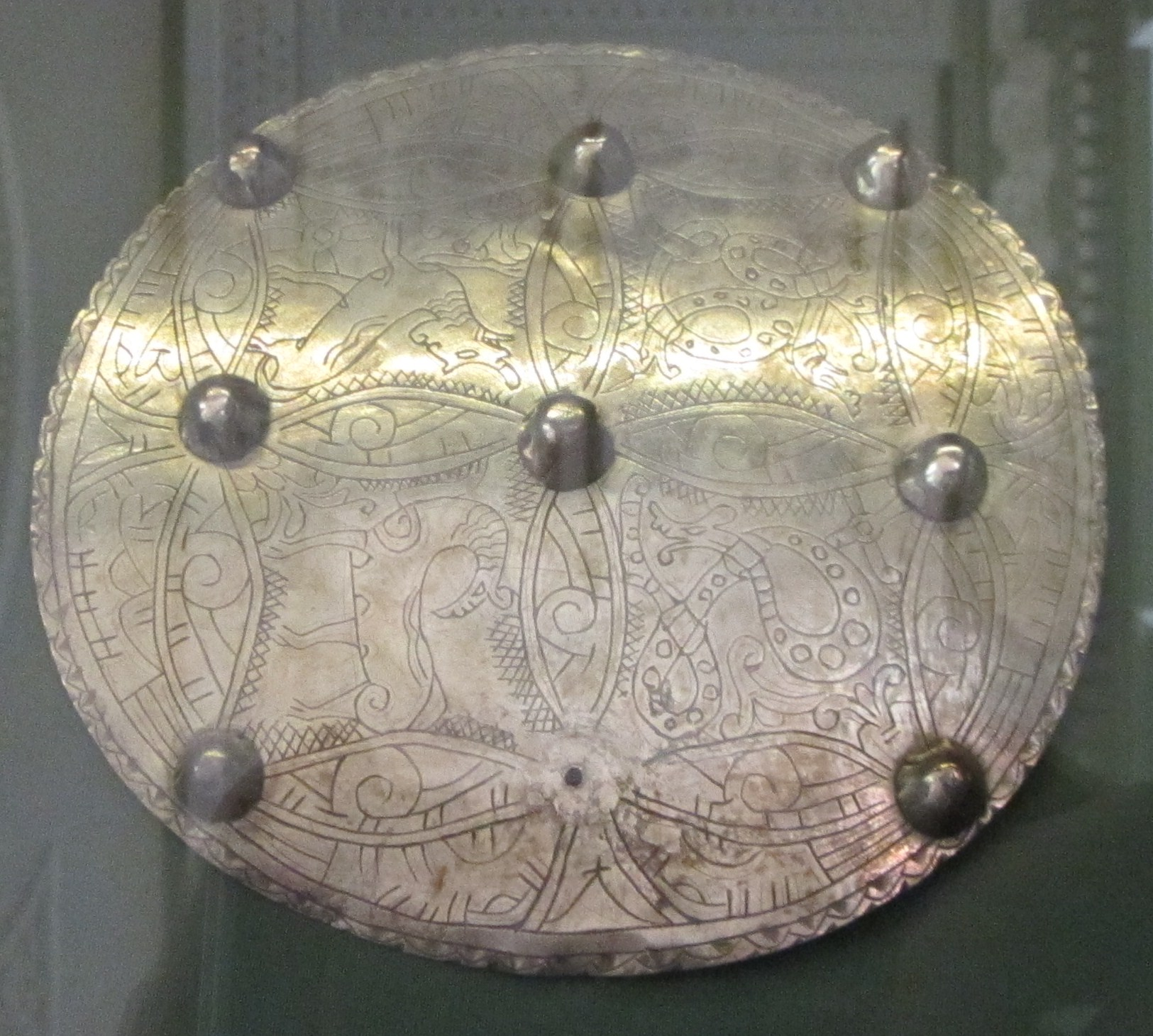

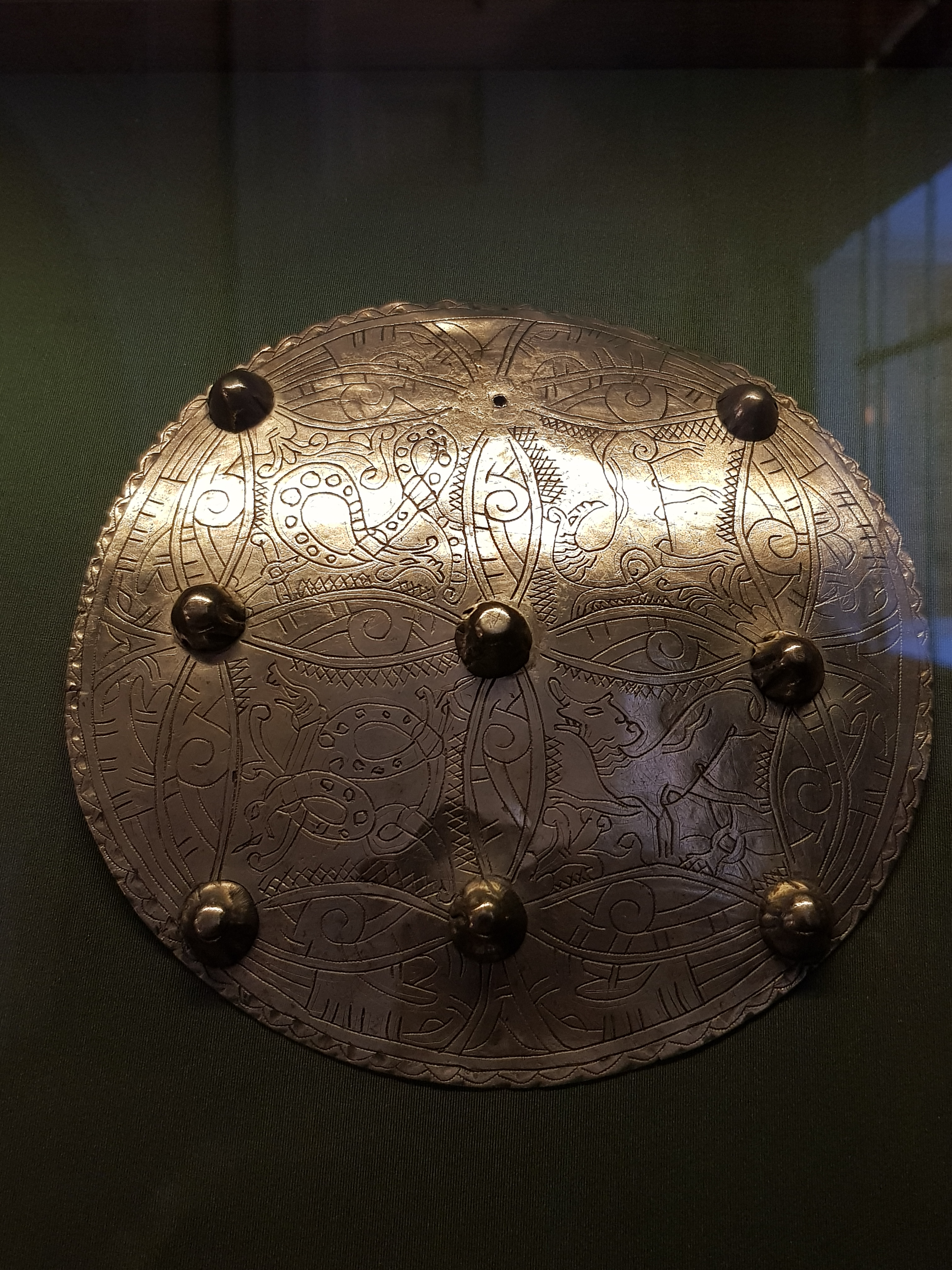

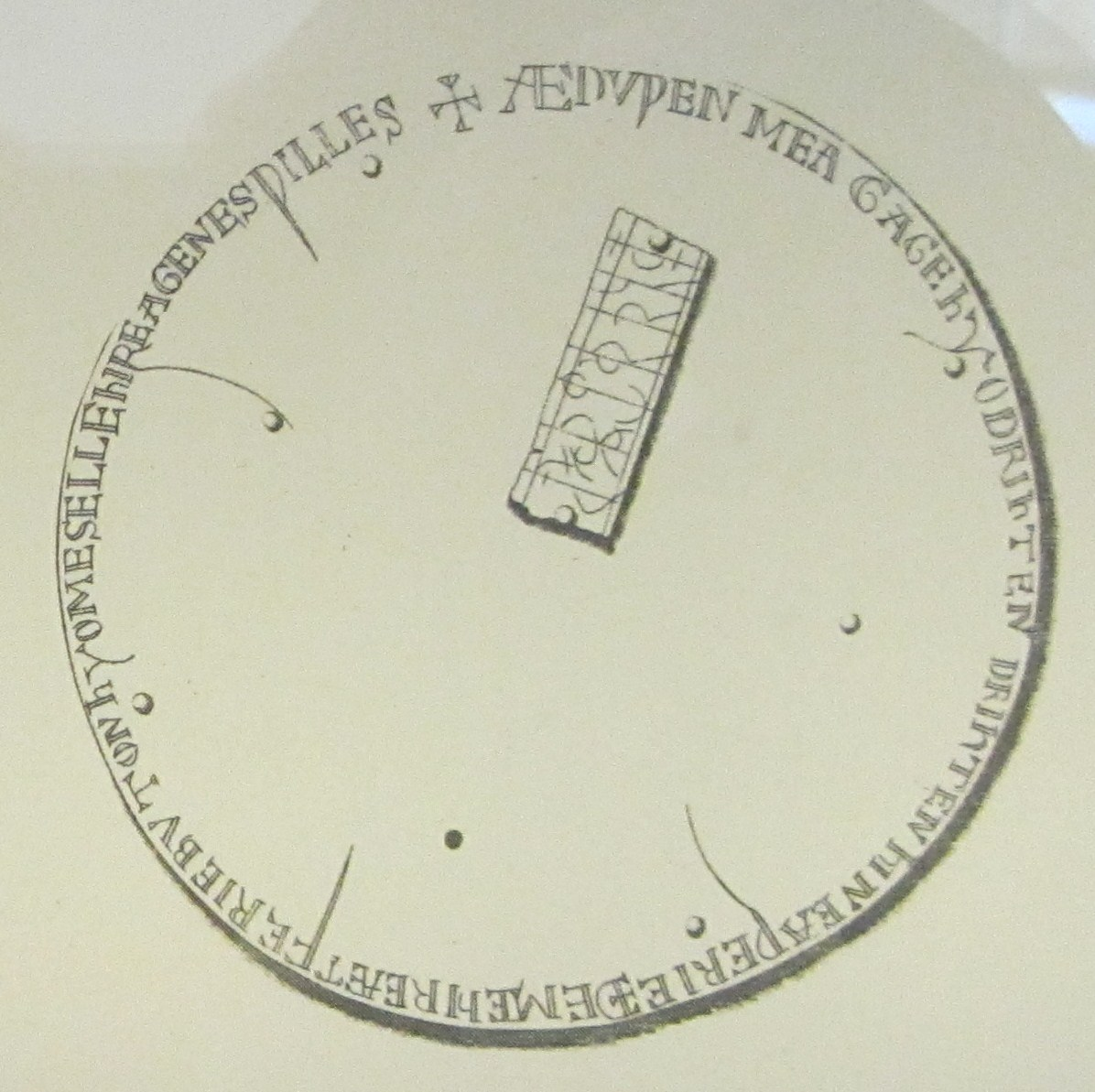
Drawing of the inscription (George Hickes, Thesaurus of Ancient Languages of the North, 1705)

Ædwen's brooch (also known as Sutton brooch, British Museum 1951,10-11,1) is an early 11th-century Anglo-Scandinavian silver disc brooch with an inscription on the reverse side. It was discovered in 1694 during the ploughing of a field in Sutton, Isle of Ely, Cambridgeshire, along with a hoard including coins and gold rings. The brooch was re-discovered in a private collection in 1951 and bought by the British Museum.

The Anglo-Saxon brooch is decorated with nine conical silver bosses (one now missing) and an engraved pattern of four overlapping circles forming flower-like motifs. In the circles are representations of different animals and plant ornaments reminiscent of the Ringerike style.

The inscription on the obverse side is a curse against those who would take the brooch from its rightful owner, Ædwen (Æduwen):

+ ÆDVǷEN ME AG AGE HYO DRIHTEN / DRIHTEN HINE AǷERIE ÐE ME HIRE ÆTFERIE / BVTON HYO ME SELLE HIRE AGENES ǷILLES
"Ædwen owns me, may the Lord own her. May the Lord curse him who takes me from her, unless she gives me of her own free will."

A short film has been made that shows the curse spoken by Ædwen in Old English and modern English. In addition, on the strip which once held the pin and catchplate, is an inscription of seven pseudo-runic characters.
