= Pliezhausen brooch =

7th-century brooch

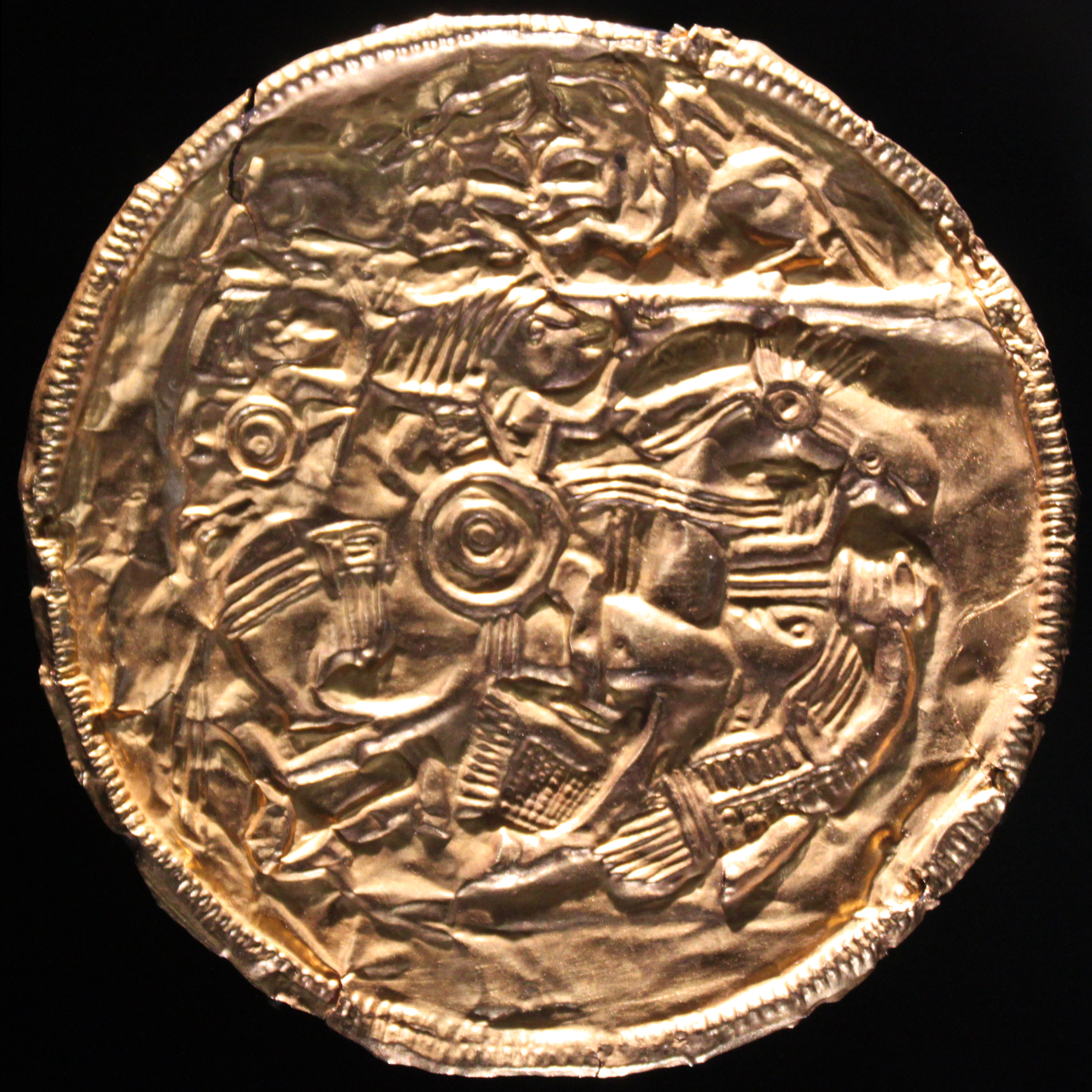
- The Pliezhausen brooch

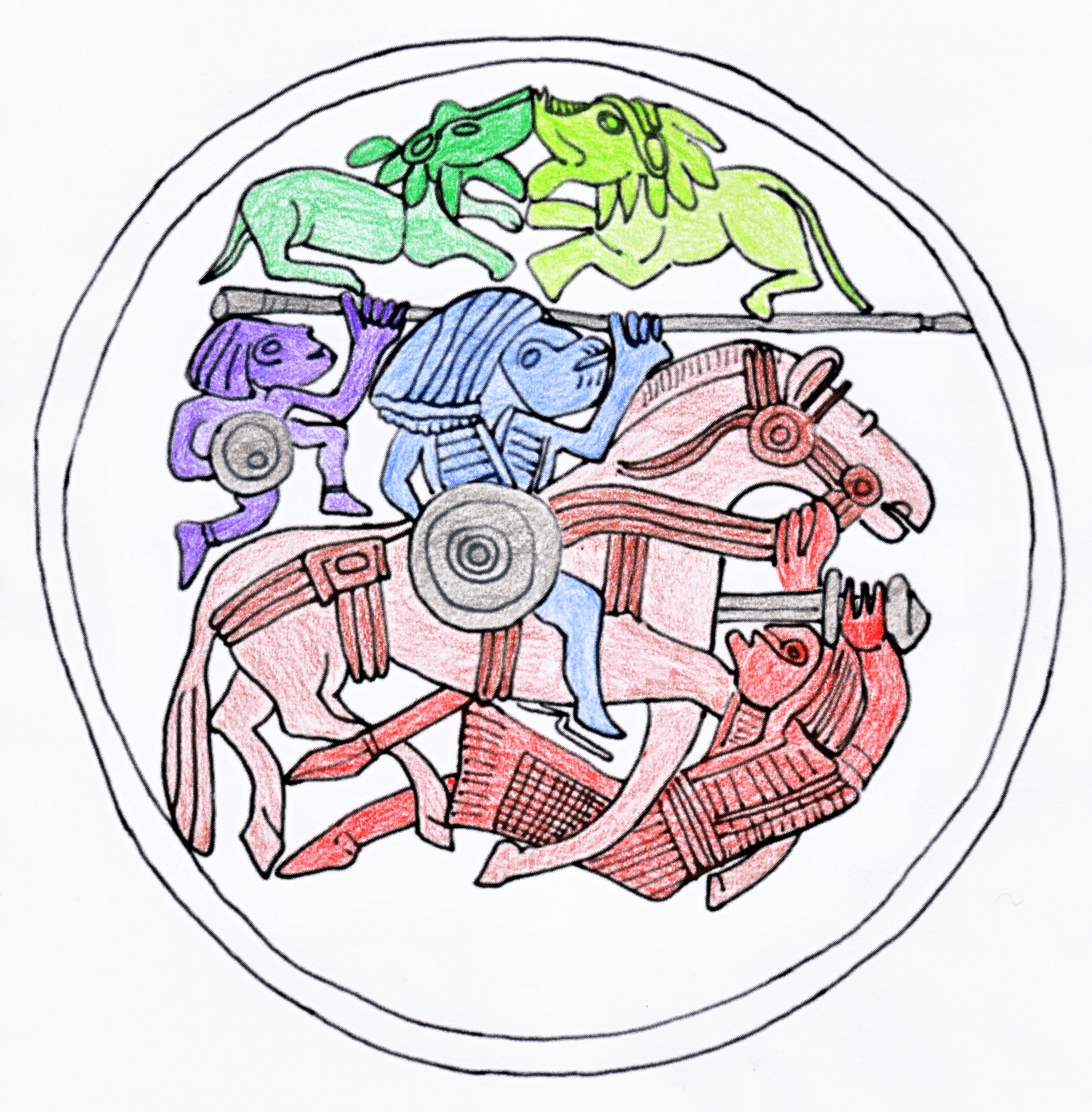
- Material: Gold
- Discovered: 1928; Pliezhausen, Germany
- Present location: Landesmuseum Württemberg

The Pliezhausen brooch (also known as the Pliezhausen disc, Pliezhausen bracteate or Pliezhausen disc brooch) (German: Reiterscheibe von Pliezhausen) is a gold disc decorated with figures that was discovered in 1928 during excavations in Pliezhausen, in the county of Reutlingen in Germany, in the grave of a wealthy Alemannic woman dating to the early 7th century and which was the front of a disc fibula. It is one of the few artifacts of the Early Middle Ages which portrays the figures of people. The brooch depicts a central spear-wielding rider trampling an enemy armed with a sword. Behind the rider is a smaller figure, who also wields a spear. Both the rider and the smaller figure carry round shields. Two facing animals are above.

== Discovery ==
During construction work in the vicinity of the street known as Pliezhauser Alamannenstraße, graves from an Alemannian grave field kept coming to light. In 1928, during the excavation of what became designated as Grave 1, that of a wealthy woman, the Pliezhausen equestrian brooch was discovered as part of the grave goods. The disc, made from a thin gold plate, was the ornamental cover for a disc fibula with a bronze pin as the fastener. Other grave goods included a bronze ring, fragments of bronze wire and 13 pearls.

The Pliezhausen brooch is displayed in the Württemberg State Museum in the Alter Schloss in Stuttgart.

== Similar Finds ==
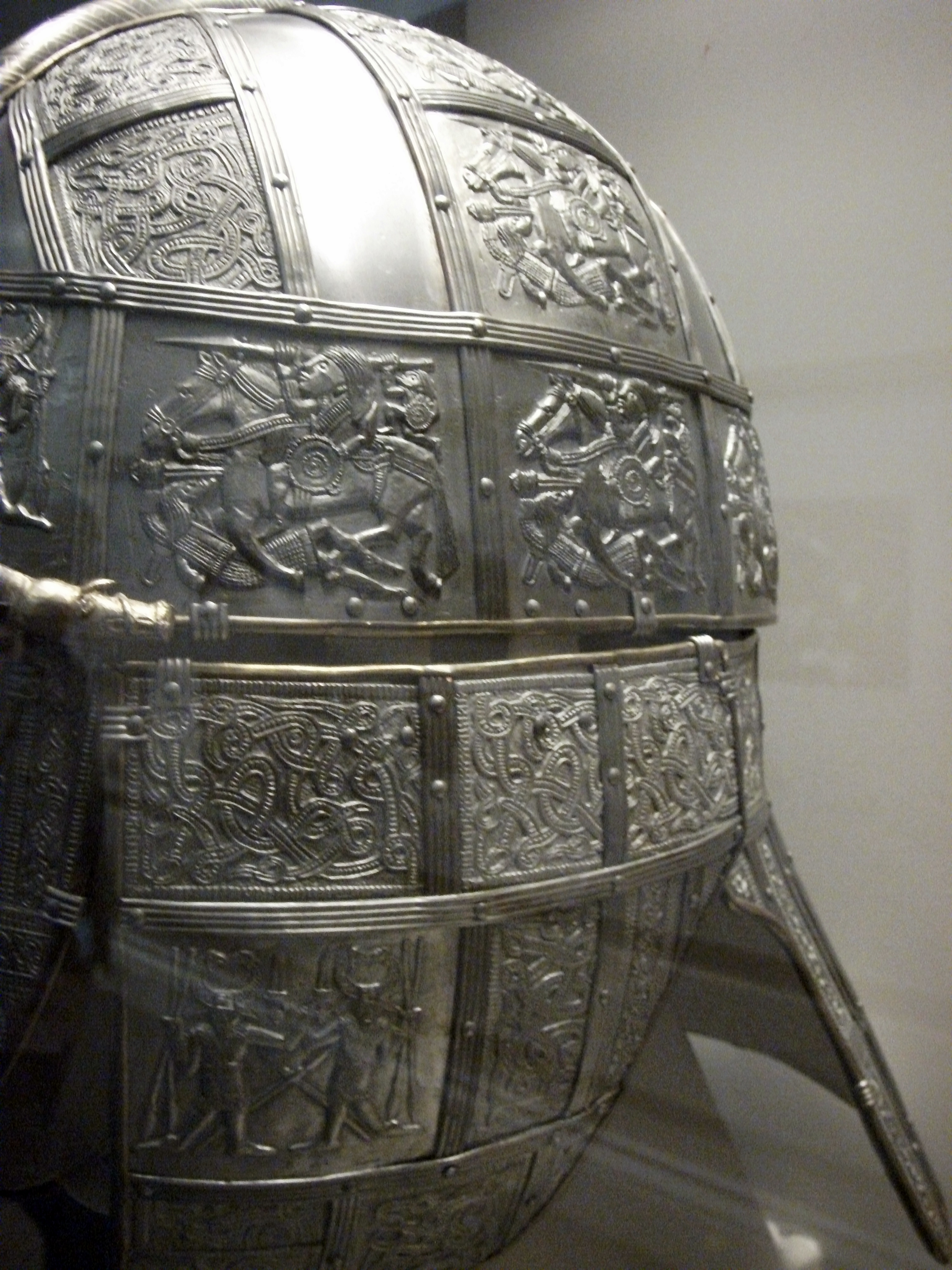
Almost identical motif on the replica of the Sutton Hoo helmet ( at the Royal Armouries Museum) that shows what the helmet might have looked like in its heyday.

Several comparable finds from the early Middle Ages are known, such as from the noble ship graves of Sutton Hoo in England and Vendel and Valsgärde in Sweden. The disc from Sutton Hoo corresponds most exactly to the Pliezhausen disc, with the exception of the mirror-image arrangement. It is one of the few naturalistic and figurative representations that have survived from the early Middle Ages and provides valuable information on the mythical and religious imagination of the pagan Alemanni at the transition to Christianity.

== Bibliography ==
- Haseloff, Günther (1979). Kunststile des Frühen Mittelalters: Völkerwanderungs- und Merowingerzeit. Stuttgart: Württembergisches Landesmuseum. (in German)
- Kurt Böhner: Die Goldscheibe von Pliezhausen. In: Gemeinde Pliezhausen (Hrsg): 900 Jahre Pliezhausen 1092-1992 - Heimat zwischen Neckar und Schönbuch. Gemeinde Pliezhausen, 1992.
- Böhner, Kurt & Quast, Dieter (1994). "Die merowingerzeitlichen Grabfunde von Pliezhausen, Kreis Reutlingen". Fundberichte aus Baden-Württemberg. 19 (1). Stuttgart: Landesdenkmalamt Baden-Württemberg: 383–419.
