= Boris Kuznetsov (athlete) =

Kazakhstani long-distance runner

Personal information
- Full name: Boris Mikhaylovich Kuznetsov
- Nationality: Kazakhstani
- Born: 12 June 1947 (age 79)

Sport
- Sport: Long-distance running
- Event: 5000 metres
Medal record
Men's athletics
Representing Soviet Union
European Indoor Championships
Bronze medal – third place	1975 Katowice	3000 m

Boris Mikhaylovich Kuznetsov (born 12 June 1947) is a Kazakhstani long-distance runner. He competed in the men's 5000 metres at the 1976 Summer Olympics, representing the Soviet Union.
