= Toshiaki Kamata =

Japanese long-distance runner

Personal information
- Nationality: Japanese
- Born: 3 November 1951 (age 73)

Sport
- Sport: Long-distance running
- Event: 5000 metres

Toshiaki Kamata (鎌田 俊明, Kamata Toshiaki; born 3 November 1951) is a Japanese long-distance runner. He competed in the men's 5000 metres at the 1976 Summer Olympics.
