= Disc fibula =

Brooch in the form of a flat disk, with a pin back

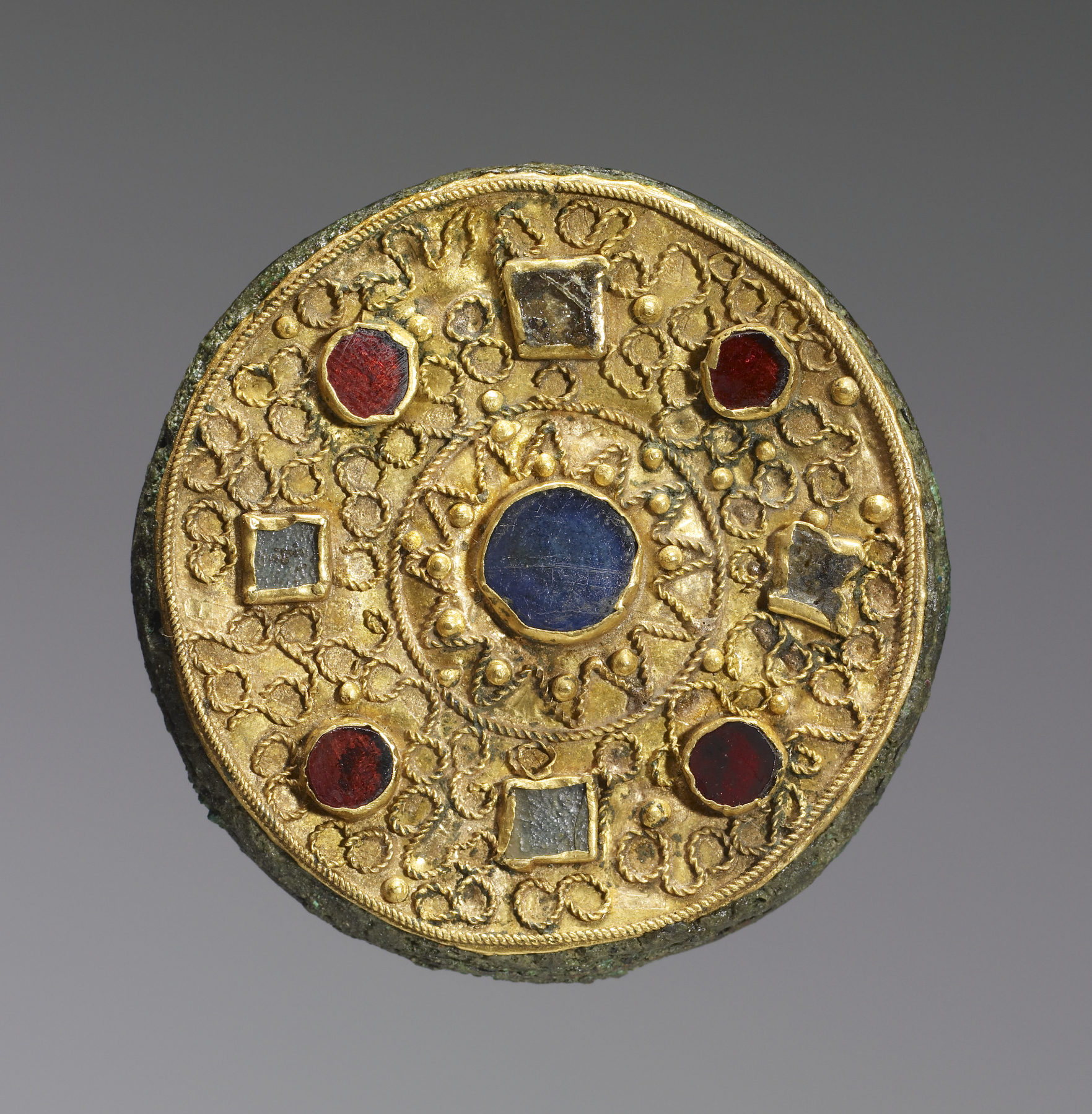
Disc fibula, ca. 7th century.

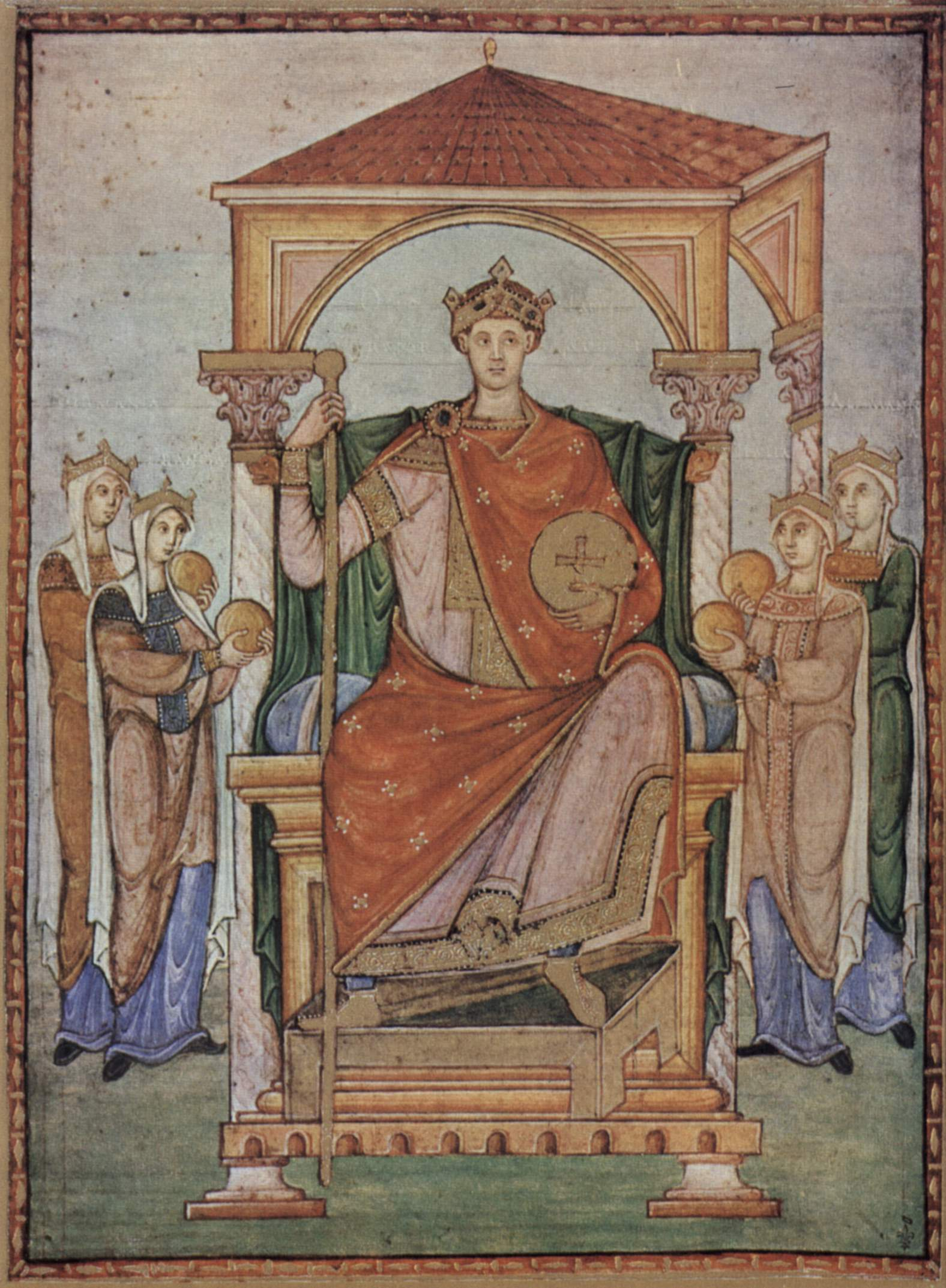
Otto the Great, portrayed wearing a prominent disc fibula

A disc fibula or disc brooch is a type of fibula, that is, a brooch, clip or pin used to fasten clothing that has a disc-shaped, often richly decorated plate or disc covering the fastener. The terms are mostly used in relation to the Middle Ages of Europe, especially the Early Middle Ages. They were the most common style of Anglo-Saxon brooches.

In Scotland, where the need for a fastening at the shoulder lasted into the Renaissance and beyond, a type of silver "turreted" brooch for men was still being made in the 16th century and later. The Brooch of Lorn is the best-known example.

== Continental Europe ==
Well-known fibulae of this type date to the Migration Period and the centuries either side of it, for example the disc fibulae from Soest or the Lower Saxon village of Holle in Germany. Disc fibulae up to over 5 centimetres in diameter were usually part of women's attire in continental Europe in the Early Middle Ages; much smaller examples were also worn by men, however, from the Carolingian era.

Many disc fibulae have gold ornamentation inlaid with gemstones, are enamelled or damascened, or are overlaid with gold or silver. The well known Pliezhausen brooch was once the cover of a disc fibula. An example from the Roman era is the Tangendorf disc brooch. The early mediaeval Maschen disc brooch portrays a figure with a saintly aureole.

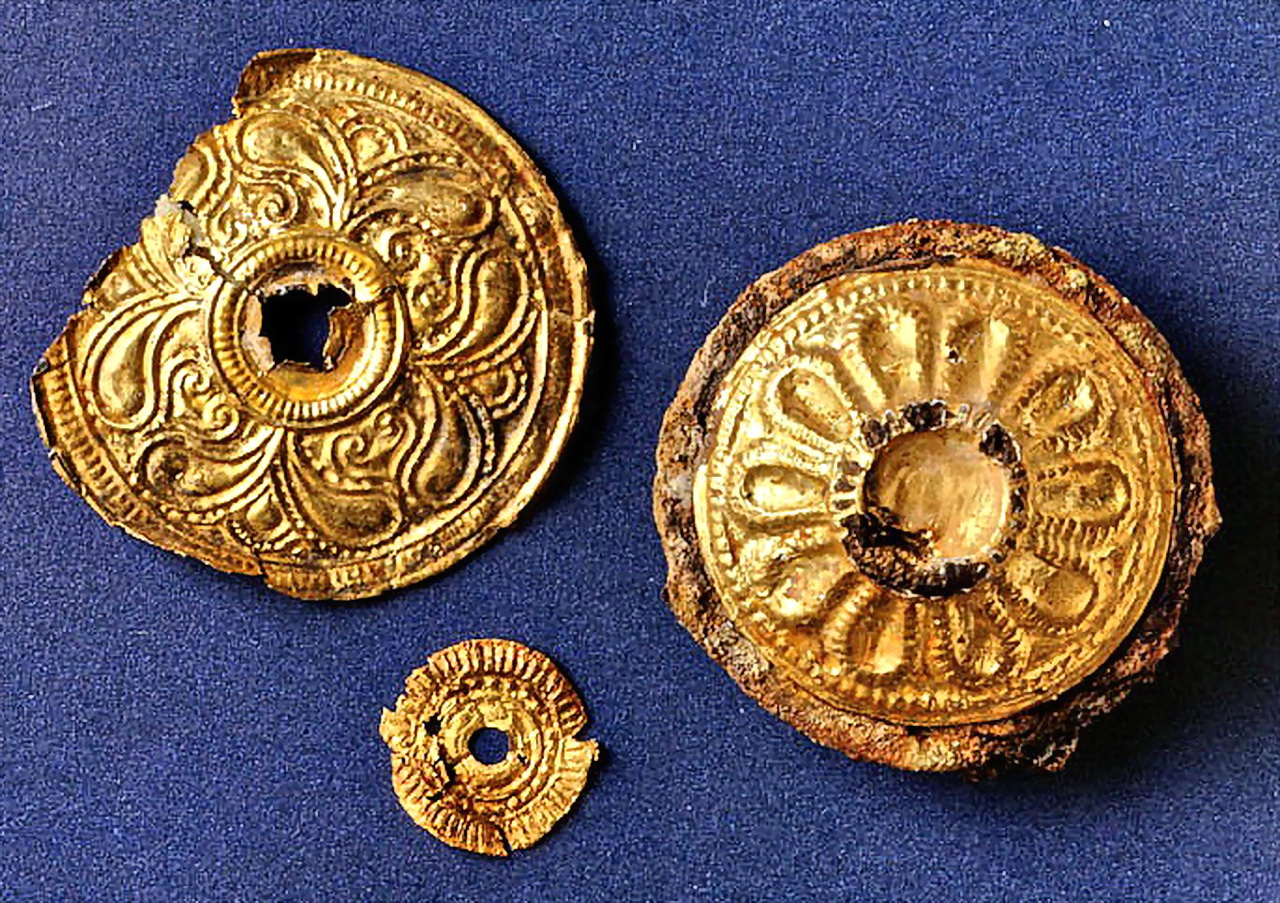
Gold disc fibulae from the Sonnenbühl prince's burial mound (La Tène period)

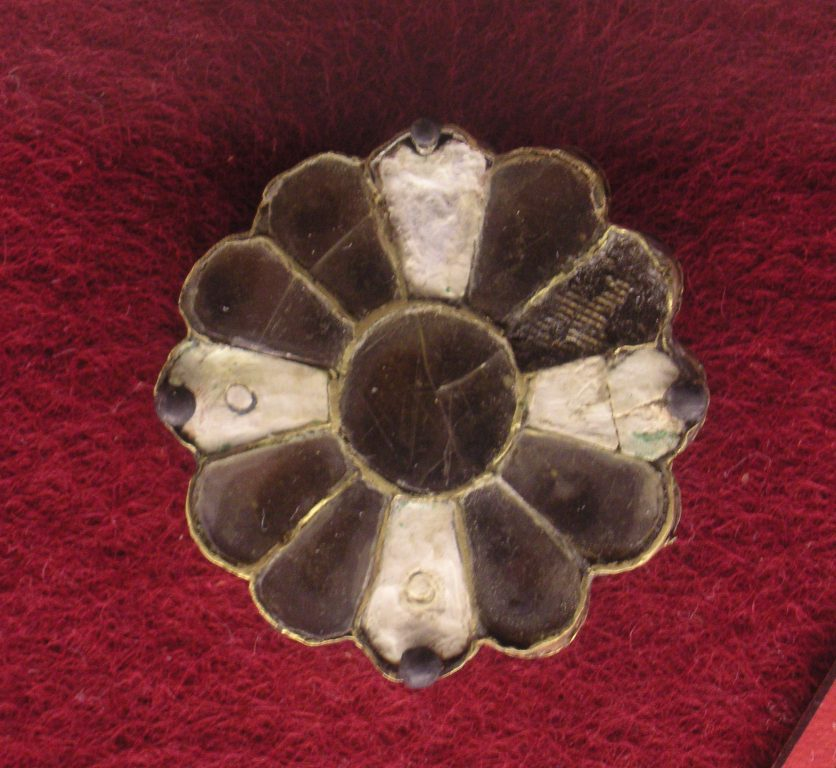
Alemannian disc fibula of the 6th century with almandine and bone inlays

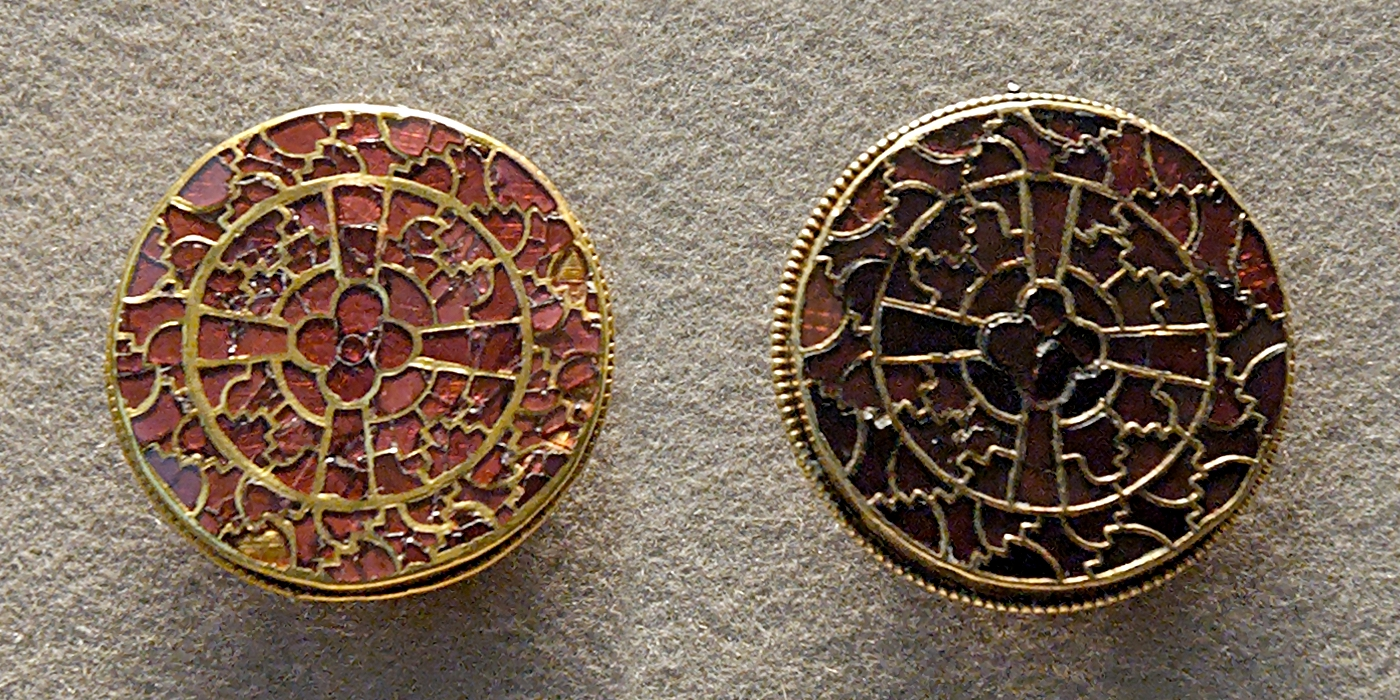
Pair of disc fibulae from the Aregund grave c. 6th C.

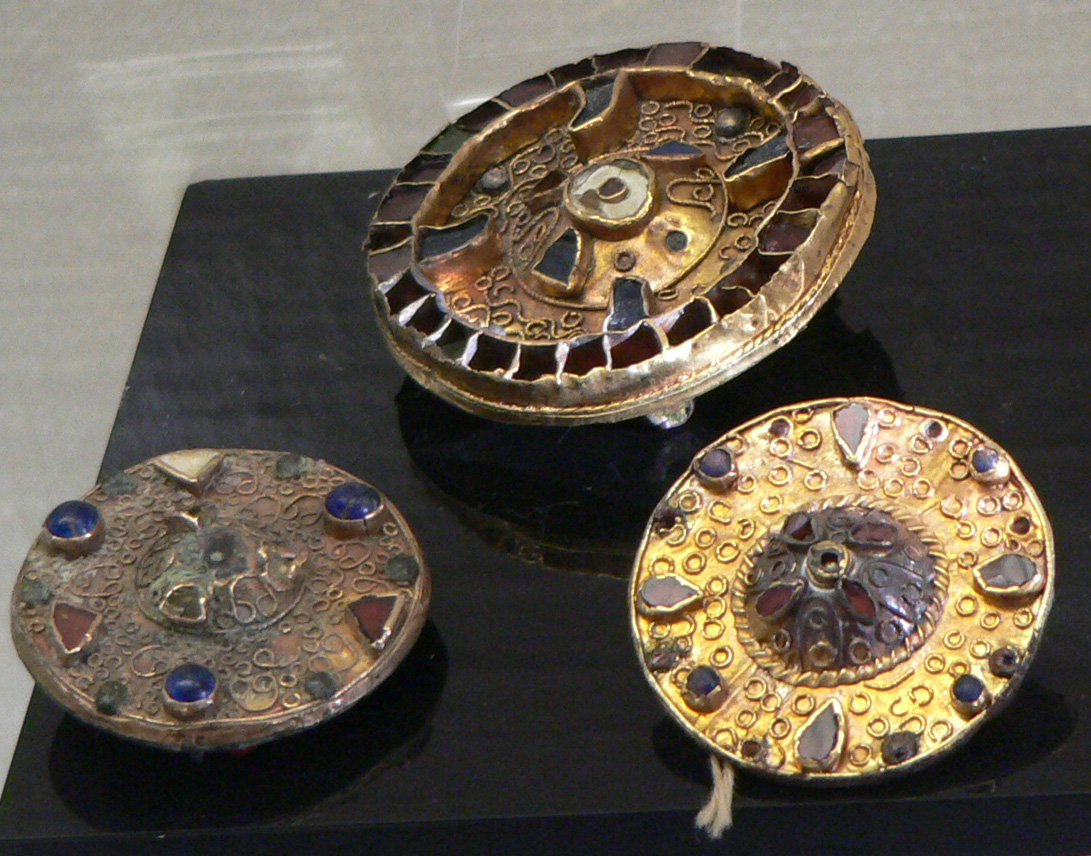
Merovingian disc fibulae of the 6th and 7th centuries with gemstones and filigree

== Anglo-Saxon types ==
Examples from Anglo-Saxon England are usually called "brooches" in English. The quoit brooch is an early type, using motifs from Late Roman art in base metal. Gold types with stones and elaborate decoration in the continental style appear from the 7th century, though later plain silver, decorated with figurative images and often using openwork, becomes more common. Examples in silver include the Fuller Brooch, Strickland Brooch and the Anglo-Scandinavian Ædwen's brooch.

Finds from the early period before Christianization are more common, as Christianity discouraged burial with expensive grave goods.

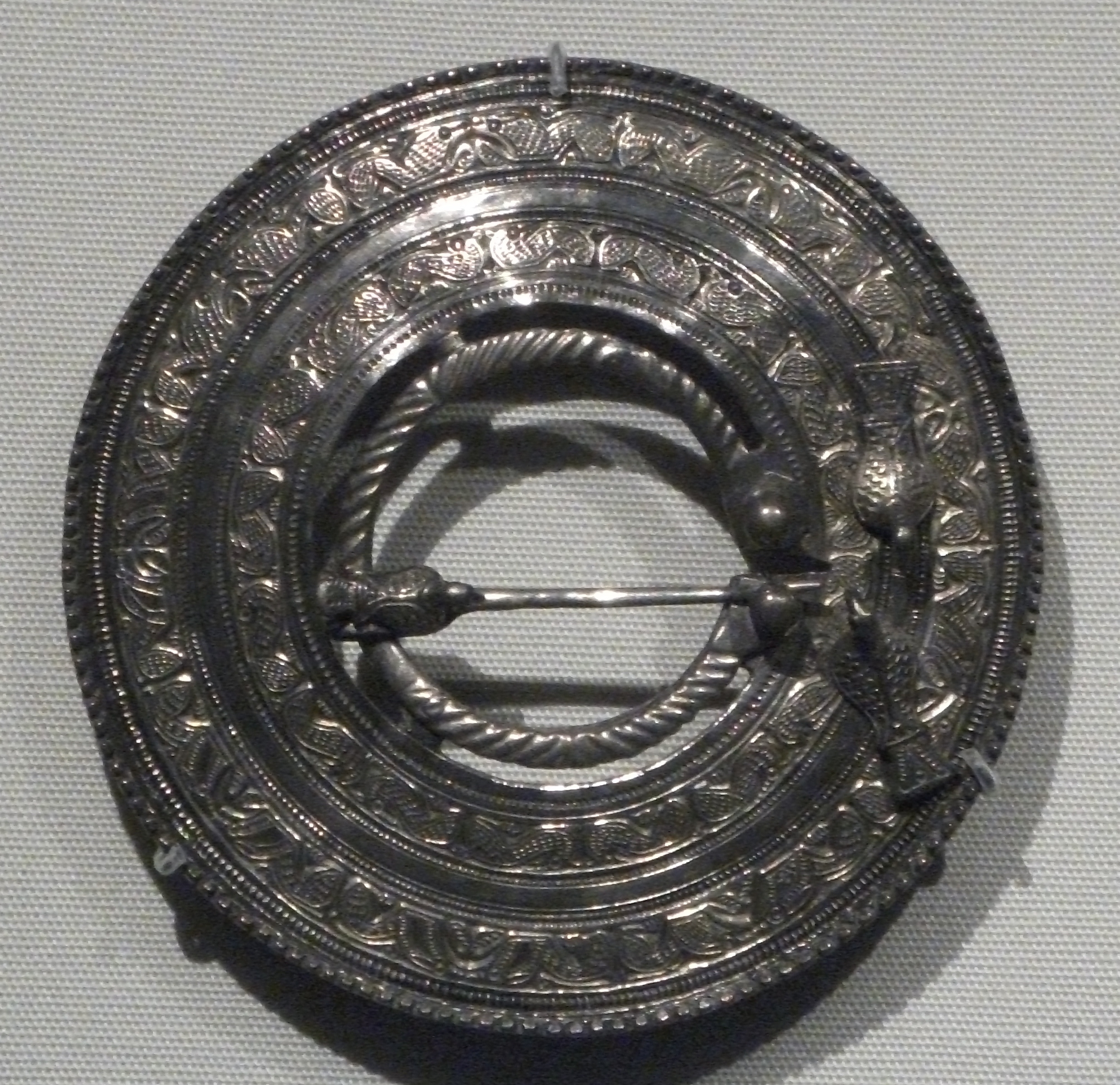
The Sarre Brooch, a 5th-century Kentish quoit brooch, British Museum

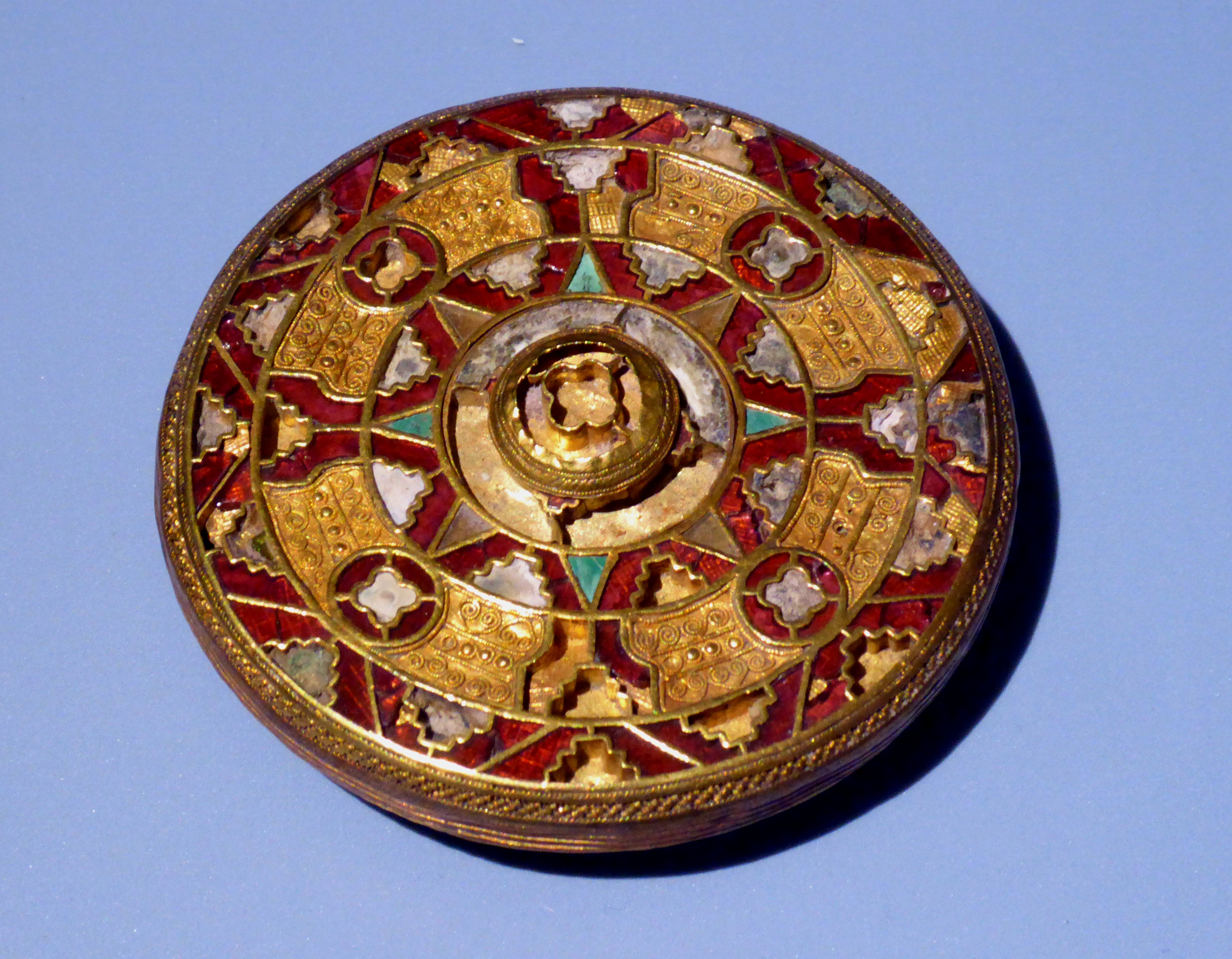
Anglo-Saxon brooch, from Monkton, Kent

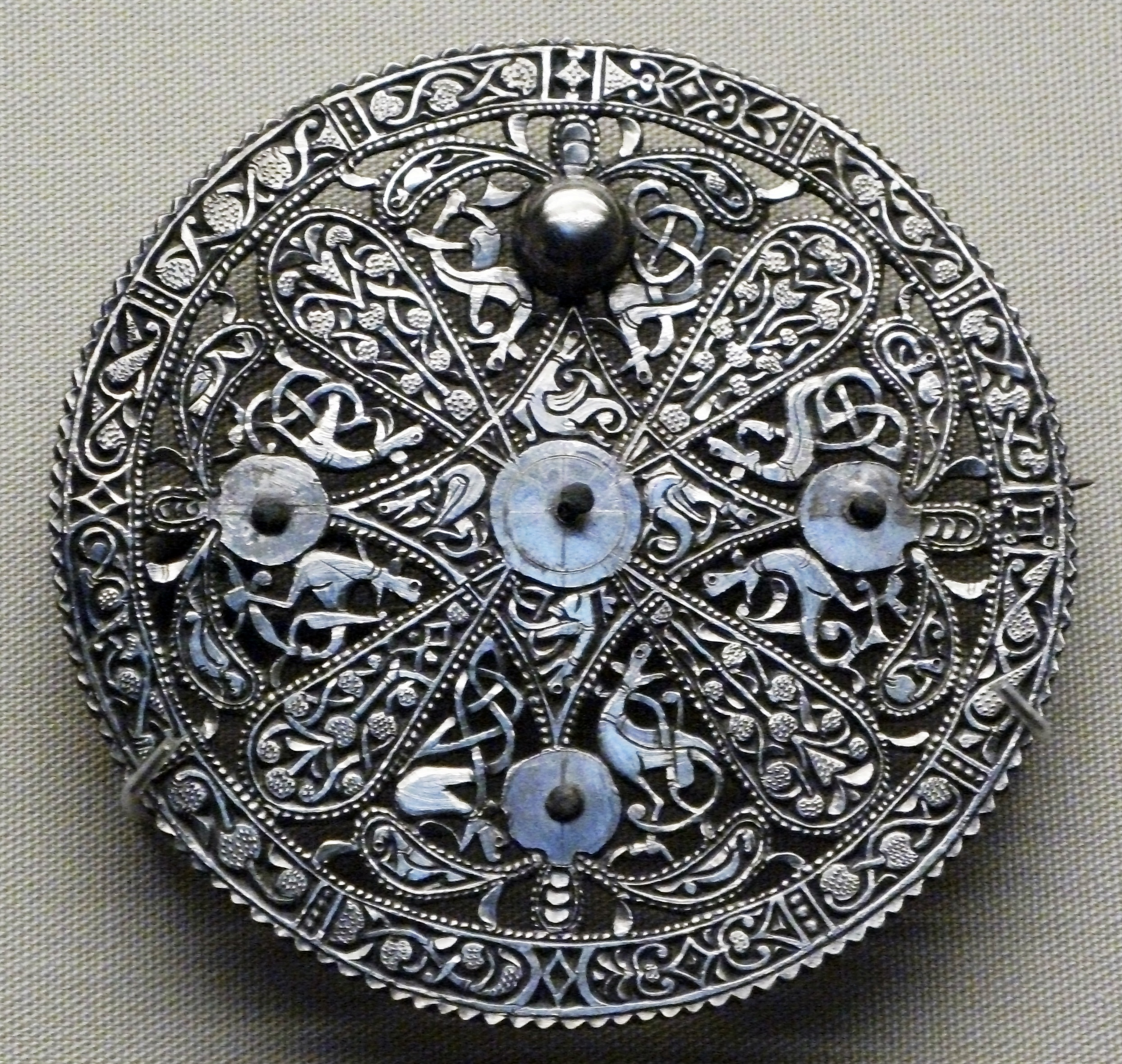
Brooch from the Pentney Hoard, in the Trewhiddle style.

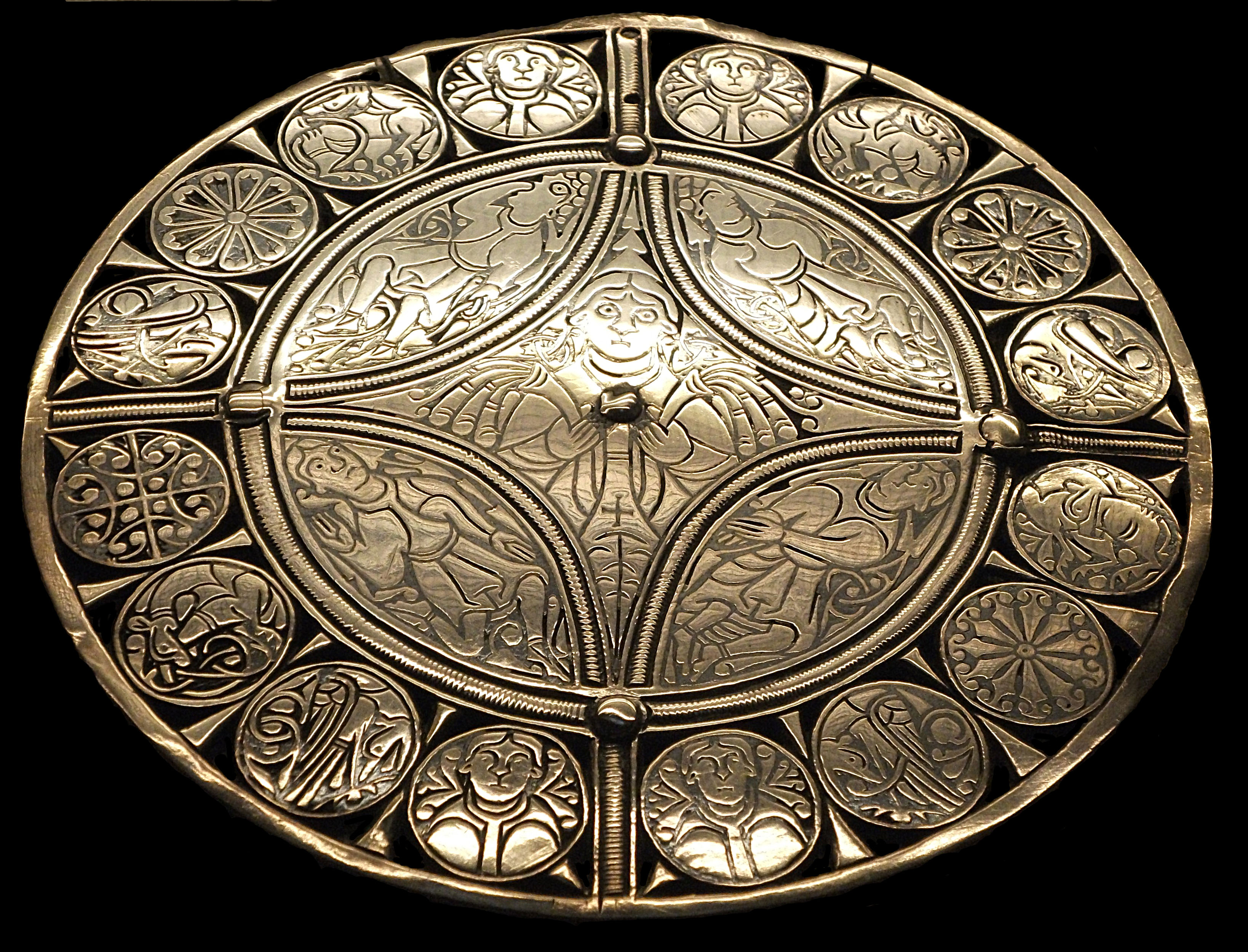
Anglo-Saxon Fuller Brooch, 9th-century

== Literature ==
- M. J. Bode: Germanische Scheibenfibeln. Ein kurzer Überblick über den Forschungsstand ausgewählter Formen. In: Jürgen Kunow (ed.): 100 Jahre Fibelformen nach Oskar Almgren. Wünsdorf, 1998, pp. 321–338, ISBN 3-910011-17-9.
- Heinrich Beck (ed.): Fibel und Fibeltracht. Sonderdruck aus Reallexikon der Germanischen Altertumskunde. Berlin, 2000, ISBN 3-11-016858-8.
- Webster, Leslie, Anglo-Saxon Art, 2012, British Museum Press, ISBN 9780714128092
