= Paul Geis =

American long-distance runner (1953–2019)

Personal information
- Full name: Paul Geoffrey Geis
- Nationality: American
- Born: February 23, 1953 Houston, Texas, U.S.
- Died: October 30, 2019 (aged 66)

Sport
- Sport: Long-distance running
- Event: 5000 metres
- College team: Oregon Ducks

Paul Geoffrey Geis (February 23, 1953 – October 30, 2019) was an American long-distance runner. He competed in the men's 5000 metres at the 1976 Summer Olympics.

== University of Oregon ==
His Sophomore year he transferred to the University of Oregon to further pursue his running career under Coach Bill Dellinger. His running accolades include being a part of the 1974 NCAA Champion Cross Country Team with Oregon, winning the 1974 NCAA 5000-meter title, and going on to become a 1976 5000-meter Olympic Finalist in Montreal. The next year he won the famous Bay to Breakers race in California.

His running career was known for his rivalry with Steve Prefontaine.
