= Manfred Kuschmann =

East German long-distance runner

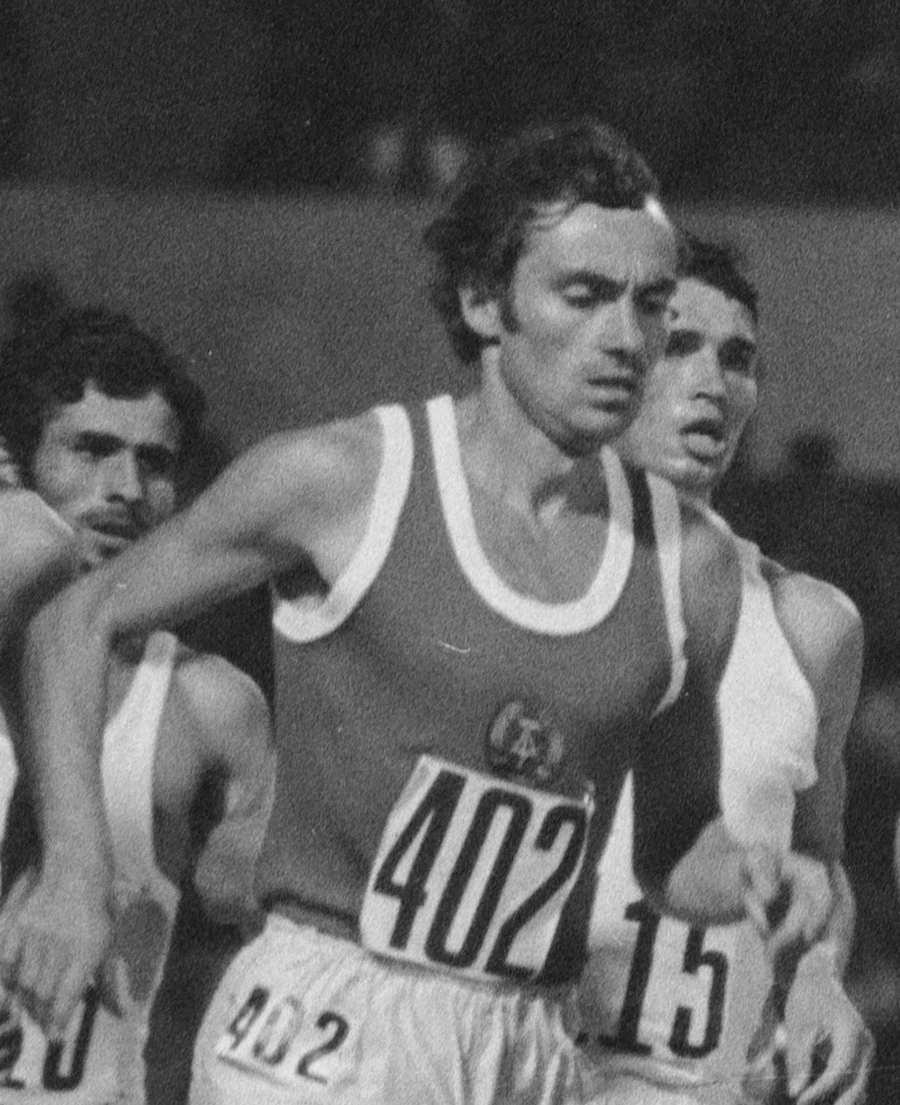
Medal record
Men's athletics
Representing East Germany
European Championships
Gold medal – first place	1974 Rome	10,000 m
Silver medal – second place	1974 Rome	5,000 m

Manfred Klaus Kuschmann (25 July 1950, Coswig, Saxony-Anhalt – 13 February 2002) was an East German long-distance runner who won two medals at the 1974 European Athletics Championships: a gold in the 10,000 metres and a silver in the 5000 metres.

He was twice a competitor at the IAAF World Cross Country Championships and twice a medallist at the European Cup.
