= Lasse Orimus =

Finnish long-distance runner

Personal information
- Full name: Lasse Antero Orimus
- Nationality: Finnish
- Born: 2 January 1950 (age 76)

Sport
- Sport: Long-distance running
- Event: 5000 metres

Lasse Antero Orimus (born 2 January 1950) is a Finnish long-distance runner. He competed in the men's 5000 metres at the 1976 Summer Olympics.
