= Peter Svet =

Slovenian/Yugoslavian long-distance runner

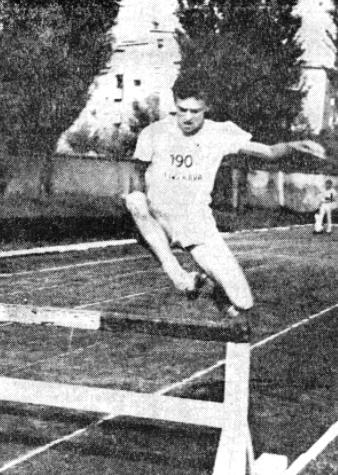
- Svet training with hurdles in 1968

Personal information
- Nationality: Yugoslav; Slovenian
- Born: 5 April 1949 (age 77) Celje, Yugoslavia

Sport
- Sport: Track
- Event(s): 3000-meter steeplechase, 5000 meters, 10,000 meters

Achievements and titles
- Personal best(s): 3000 m steeple: 8:29.6; 5000 meters: 13:32.8; 10,000 meters: 28:45.4

Peter Svet (Cyrillic: Петар Свет; born 5 April 1949), sometimes spelled as Petar Svet, is a Slovenian former long-distance runner who competed for Yugoslavia throughout the 1970s. In addition to the 5000 and 10,000 meters, he also specialized as a steeplechaser. He holds multiple Slovenian records in athletics.

Hailing from Celje, Svet won the 1974 Balkan Cross Country Championships. At the 1974 European Athletics Championships, he placed 10th in the men's 5000 meters finals, running a personal best time of 13:41.6. His previous best time before the race was 13:52. He also ran in the men's 10,000 meters event, placing 18th. That same summer of 1974, he set the national record for the 3000 m steeplechase at 8:29.6; after that summer however, his athletic career stagnated starting with a surgery and he never returned to form.

He was a Yugoslavian champion on five occasions: twice in cross country running (1973, 1974) and three times in steeplechase (1973, 1974, 1979). He also competed in later life, representing his native Slovenia at the 2000 European Veterans Athletics Championships, where he was the over-50s steeplechase winner.
