= 1975 European Athletics Indoor Championships – Men's 3000 metres =

The men's 3000 metres event at the 1975 European Athletics Indoor Championships was held on 9 March in Katowice.

== Results ==
Rank	Name	Nationality	Time	Notes
1st place, gold medalist(s)	Ian Stewart	Great Britain	7:58.6	
2nd place, silver medalist(s)	Pekka Päivärinta	Finland	7:58.6	
3rd place, bronze medalist(s)	Boris Kuznetsov	Soviet Union	8:01.2	
4	Ivan Parluy	Soviet Union	8:02.4	
5	Peter Weigt	West Germany	8:02.6	
6	Paul Copu	Romania	8:04.0	
7	Edgard Salvé	Belgium	8:04.4	
8	Dan Glans	Sweden	8:04.4	
9	Kazimierz Maranda	Poland	8:06.4	
10	Antonio Burgos	Spain	8:09.4	
11	Martin Zvoníček	Czechoslovakia	8:10.8	
12	Heikki Vakkuri	Finland	8:13.0	
13	Paul Thijs	Belgium	8:21.8	
