= Richard Simonsen =

Norwegian sprinter

Richard Simonsen (born 20 August 1945) is a former Norwegian sprinter who specialized in the 200 and 400 metres.

Simonsen ran for the Minnesota Golden Gophers track and field team, leading off their All-American 4 × 100 m relay team at the 1968 NCAA University Division outdoor track and field championships.

He finished eighth in 4 × 400 metres relay at the 1971 European Championships with his teammates Steinar Mo, Gøte Lundblad and Per Rom. He also participated at the 1969 European Championships, but never at the Summer Olympics. He became Norwegian champion in 200 m in 1967, 1970 and 1971 and in 400 m in the years 1967–1970.
