= Pliezhausen =

- Municipality
- Coat of arms

- Location of Pliezhausen within Reutlingen district
- Interactive map of Pliezhausen
- Location within Germany Location within Baden-Württemberg
- Coordinates: 48°33′31″N 09°12′21″E
- Country: Germany
- State: Baden-Württemberg
- Admin. region: Tübingen
- District: Reutlingen
- Subdivisions: 4 Ortsteile

Government
  - Mayor (2021–29): Christof Dold

Area
  - Total: 17.31 km^{2} (6.68 sq mi)
- Elevation: 331 m (1,086 ft)

Population (2025-12-31)
  - Total: 9,837
  - Density: 568.3/km^{2} (1,472/sq mi)
- Time zone: UTC+01:00 (CET)
  - Summer (DST): UTC+02:00 (CEST)
- Postal codes: 72124
- Dialling codes: 07127
- Vehicle registration: RT
- Website: www.pliezhausen.de

Pliezhausen (Swabian: Bliazhausa) is a municipality in the district of Reutlingen in Baden-Württemberg in Germany.

== Geography ==
Pliezhausen is located between the Neckar and the Schönbuch.

== Constituent communities ==
The original municipality Pliezhausen consists of the districts Pliezhausen, Dörnach and Gniebel. After the incorporation of Rübgarten on 9 May 1975, the current municipality Pliezhausen was formed.

== History ==
Pliezhausen was first mentioned in 1092 as' 'Plidolfeshusin'. It first belonged to the County Achalm-Urach and came in the 13th century to Württemberg. 1609 ravaged the plague, 40 percent of the 300 inhabitants died. From 1635 led the Thirty Years' War to further devastation and death. The town originally belonged to Oberamt Urach and came in 1842 to Oberamt Tübingen and in the context of Baden-Württemberg district reform in 1973 to the district Reutlingen.

In 1928, the Pliezhausen brooch, a rare 7th-century gold disc was discovered during excavations in Pliezhausen in the grave of a wealthy Alemannic woman.

== Incorporations ==
=== Dörnach ===
Dörnach was first documented in 1134. Dörnach was incorporated in 1971 to Pliezhausen.

=== Gniebel ===
Gniebel belonged to the Counts of Zollern. Gniebel was incorporated in 1971 to Pliezhausen.

=== Rübgarten ===
The place itself was first mentioned in 1363. Rübgarten was incorporated in 1975 to Pliezhausen.

== Religions ==
The Martinskirche in Pliezhausen was built in the 11th or 12th century as a Romanesque chapel. In the 16th century it was remodeled gothic. The original tower dates back to 1523, the current to 1875.

== Mayor ==
Otwin Brucker was the mayor from 10 January 1967. On 18 July 2005 Christof Dold was voted as successor.

== Literature ==
- Pliezhäuser G'schichten: gesammelt von Schülern und Lehrern der Grund- und Hauptschule Pliezhausen. Zwei Bände. Herausgegeben von Grund- und Hauptschule, Pliezhausen 1981.
- Christel Köhle-Hezinger: Stricken - daheim und in der Fabrik: zur Erwerbsgeschichte von Pliezhausen im 19. und 20. Jahrhundert, herausgegeben von der Gemeinde Pliezhausen und Dorfmuseum Ahnenhaus, Pliezhausen 1993.
- Susanne Rückl-Kohn: Geburt + Taufe: von Hebammen, Hausgeburt, Wochenbett und Patenpflicht, herausgegeben von der Gemeinde Pliezhausen und Dorfmuseum Ahnenhaus, Pliezhausen.
- Susanne Rückl-Kohn: Tod + Erinnern: vom Sterben, Tod und Angedenken, Ausstellung im Dorfmuseum, herausgegeben von der Gemeinde Pliezhausen und Dorfmuseum Ahnenhaus, Plietzhausen 1995.
- Landesarchivdirektion Baden-Württemberg in Verbindung mit dem Landkreis Reutlingen (Hrsg.): Der Landkreis Reutlingen. Band II. B: Gemeindebeschreibungen Münsingen bis Zwiefalten, Gutsbezirk Münsingen Jan Thorbecke Verlag, Sigmaringen 1997, ISBN 3-7995-1357-4.
