= Per Rom =

Norwegian sprinter

Per Rom (born 28 October 1946) is a former Norwegian sprinter who specialized in the 200 and 400 metres.

He finished eighth in 4 x 400 metres relay at the 1971 European Championships with his teammates Steinar Mo, Gøte Lundblad and Richard Simonsen. He became Norwegian champion in 400 m in 1971. He represented the clubs Askim IF and IL i BUL.

His personal best time was 46.73 seconds, achieved in the heats of the 1971 European Championships. This puts him seventh on the Norwegian all-time list.
