= Klaus-Peter Hildenbrand =

Medal record

Men's Athletics

Representing West Germany

Olympic Games
| Bronze medal – third place | 1976 Montreal | 5000 metres |

Klaus-Peter Hildenbrand (born 11 September 1952 in Dörrebach) is a retired West German athlete who competed mainly in the 5000 metres.

In the 1974 European Athletics Championships, he placed eighth in the 5,000-metre final, about fifteen seconds behind the winner, Great Britain's Brendan Foster.

He competed for West Germany in the 1976 Summer Olympics held in Montreal, Quebec, Canada in the 5000 metres where he won the bronze medal. he had run the second fastest 5,000 metres in the world in 1976, after New Zealand's Dick Quax, who won the silver medal in that closely fought and dramatic race. After running around the middle of the fourteen-man group, Hildenbrand took the lead shortly before 3,400 metres. He kept it until he voluntarily surrendered it to Finland's Lasse Virén at 3,900 metres. On the final back straight, he kicked furiously to draw level with New Zealand's Rodney Dixon at 4,800 metres. At the start of the final bend, he briefly drew level or almost level with Virén. On the second half of the final bend, Quax kicked past him to challenge Virén for the lead. Throughout the home straight, Hildenbrand fought Dixon for the bronze. In the final metres, he decided to ensure the bronze medal for himself by lunging across the finish line. This helped him defeat Dixon by 0.12 seconds.
