= Knut Børø =

Norwegian long-distance runner

Knut Tore Børø (born 28 September 1948 in Hitra) is a retired Norwegian long-distance runner who specialized in 5000 and 10,000 metres. He represented Strindheim IL.

At the 1974 European Championships he finished eleventh in the 5000 m and sixth in the 10,000 m. He competed at the Summer Olympics in 1972, without reaching the finals, and 1976, dropping out of the 10,000-metre final due to a leg injury (see Hannus, Matti, ed., "The Montreal Olympic Book", Helsinki: Juoksija/Runner Magazine, 1976), and placed 29th at the 1974 IAAF World Cross Country Championships. He became Norwegian champion in 5000 m in 1973 and 1975 and in 10,000 m in 1973.

== Personal bests ==
- 3000 metres - 7:49.4 min (1974) - seventh among Norwegian 3000 m runners.
- 5000 metres - 13:21.8 min (1975) - sixth among Norwegian 5000 m runners.
- 10,000 metres - 27:56.2 min (1975) - fourth among Norwegian 10,000 m runners, only behind Are Nakkim, Knut Kvalheim and John Halvorsen.
