= Aniceto Simões =

Portuguese long-distance runner

Personal information
- Full name: Aniceto Silva Simões
- Nationality: Portuguese
- Born: 8 September 1945 (age 80)

Sport
- Sport: Long-distance running
- Event: 5000 metres

Aniceto Silva Simões (born 8 September 1945) is a Portuguese long-distance runner. He competed in the men's 5000 metres at the 1976 Summer Olympics.
