= Knut Kvalheim =

Norwegian long-distance runner

Knut Kvalheim (born 14 June 1950) is a retired Norwegian long-distance runner. He is the brother of Arne Kvalheim.

He finished fourteenth at the 1974 European Championships (5000 m), ninth at the 1976 Summer Olympics (5000 m) and ninth at the 1978 European Championships (10,000 m). He also competed without reaching the final at the European Championships in 1971 and 1982.

He was a Norwegian champion in 1500 metres in 1973, 3000 metres steeplechase in 1975, 5000 metres in 1974, 1976, 1977, 1978, 1979, 1981 and 1982. and 10,000 metres in 1976, 1977, 1978 and 1982. He represented the sports club IK Tjalve. While studying in the United States, both brothers ran for the University of Oregon and the Oregon Track Club.

He held the Norwegian records in 1500, 3000, 5000 and 10,000 m for many years. His personal best times were:

- 1500 metres - 3:38.1 min (1976) - sixth on the Norwegian all-time list.
- 3000 metres - 7:42.4 min (1974) - third on the Norwegian all-time list, only behind Henrik Ingebrigtsen and Marius Bakken.
- 3000 metres steeplechase - 8:25.2 min (1974) - fifth on the Norwegian all-time list, only behind Jim Svenøy, Bjørnar Ustad Kristensen, Espen Borge and Are Nakkim.
- 5000 metres - 13:20.54 min (1974) - number nine on the Norwegian all-time list.
- 10,000 metres - 27:41.26 min (1978) - second on the Norwegian all-time list, only behind Are Nakkim.
- Half marathon - 1:03:30 hrs (1984).
- Marathon - 2:15:11 hrs (1982).

After retiring, he has worked as a coach for Susanne Wigene and others.
