= Arne Kvalheim =

Norwegian long-distance runner

Arne Kvalheim (born 25 April 1945 in Hønefoss) is a retired Norwegian long-distance runner. He is the brother of Knut Kvalheim.

He finished fourth at the 1974 European Indoor Championships (3000 m) and sixth at the 1974 European Championships (5000 m). He also competed without reaching the final at the 1968 Summer Olympics as well as the European Championships in 1966 and 1971.

He was a Norwegian champion in 800 metres in 1966, 1500 metres in 1966, 1967, 1969, 1970 and 1972 and 5000 metres in 1969, 1970 and 1971.

In Norway, he represented the sports club IK Tjalve. While studying in the United States, both brothers ran for the University of Oregon and the Oregon Track Club and helped the club setting a world record in the 4 x 1 mile relay at Eugene on May 30, 1968 in 16:05,0 min.

His personal best times were:

- 800 metres - 1:48.7 min (1967).
- 1500 metres - 3:38.5 min (1968)
- 3000 metres - 7:44.8 min (1974)
- 5000 metres - 13:26.4 min (1974)
- 10,000 metres - 28:47.0 min (1974).
